= Hans Nibel =

German engineer (1880–1934)

- Born: Johann Nibel; 31 August 1880; Olleschau, Moravia, Austria-Hungary
- Died: 25 November 1934 (aged 54); Stuttgart, Nazi Germany
- Education: Technical University of Munich
- Occupations: Engineer; Product Design and Development Manager/Director; Technical Director; Motorsport driver
- Known for: Management career with "Benz and Cie AG" in 1904–1926, and "Daimler-Benz AG" in 1926–1934
- Spouse: Anna Rohrer (1883–1980)

Johann "Hans" Nibel (31 August 1880 – 25 November 1934) was a German mechanical engineer.

He was employed for more than a quarter of a century in positions of increasing influence at Benz and Cie and, after the 1926 merger, its successor entity, Daimler-Benz AG. He is best remembered for his time as Technical Director, a position he took over from Ferdinand Porsche following an acrimonious falling out between the company and Dr. Porsche. Between 1929 and 1934 Nibel was responsible for a succession of new Mercedes-Benz models of which, in commercial terms, the Mercedes-Benz W15, introduced in October 1931, was probably the most important. During the savage backwash from the Great Depression the W15 was relatively affordable, enabling the manufacturer to retain a major presence in the German auto market in a way that the large expensive cars with which Mercedes-Benz had increasingly been associated during the 1920s never could have done. (Note: In terms of unit sales on the German passenger car market, Mercedes-Benz had slumped to position 7 by 1931. When Nibel died in 1934 they ranked fourth, behind Opel, DKW and Adler.)

== Life ==
=== Provenance and early years ===
Johann "Hans" Nibel was born into a Catholic family at Olleschau, Austria-Hungary (today Olšany in the Olomouc Region of the Czech Republic). He had one brother and two sisters. At that time, and until 1918, the entire region was part of the Austro-Hungarian empire. Nibel's father, also called Johann Nibel (1839–1914), was a factory director, probably of a paper factory. Through his father the boy was exposed to many of the finer points of the production technologies of those times from an early age. He was evidently a studious schoolboy. A surviving certificate from his school days dated 1899 classified him as "outstanding" in respect of Mathematics, Physics and Drawing, which hints at the specialisms that would best support him in his future career. He attended the Humanities Gymnasium in Šumperk, from where, having passed the necessary school final exams (Abitur), he moved on to enrol at the Technical University of Munich. Here he studied for a degree in engineering.

=== Benz & Cie AG ===
He graduated with a "Diplom-Ingenieur" engineering degree. He obtained his first professional work experience working at a succession of relatively small engineering and manufacturing businesses, Armed with an excellent set of exam results, on 1 March 1904, still aged just 24, Hans Nibel joined the Mannheim main design office of Benz & Cie AG, which was already established as one of the largest automobile manufacturers in the world. The first decade of the twentieth century was a period of rapid growth for the company, and in the design office Nibel's own career progressed even more rapidly. Through the development of a succession of successful racing and record breaking cars he became the recipient of various awards, and in 1908, only four years after joining the company, he was appointed to the position of "Chefkonstrukteur" ("Head of product development and design"). An early innovation under Nibel's management was the 1908 "head controlled motor", followed in 1910 by the four-valve engine. In 1911, under his leadership, the company produced a block-based engine and a dual ignition system. Although such features were initially applied on cars designed to race or break speed records, over the next couple of decades they would become increasingly mainstream across the automobile industry.

Beyond the automobile business, Nibel introduced improvements for the oil powered engine designed in Sweden by Jonas Hesselman and manufactured at the time by Benz under licence. At the other end of at least one spectrum, drawing inspiration from developments in the design of engines for racing cars, in 1909 he designed an aircraft engine, providing the impetus for the company to set up a new division to operate alongside its main automobile manufacturing business.

As far as the passenger car business was concerned, the period was characterised by two main trends in terms of broadening the range in both directions. A number of smaller models were introduced in order to increase the number of potential customers. A notable example was the 1910 launch of the four-cylinder Benz 6/14 PS. At the other end of the range, Benz continued to offer increasingly luxurious models, identified by admirers as "global ambassadors for the excellent cars from Mannheim". Then as now, for many people there was an obvious overlap in car design between luxury and speed. The name of Hans Mobel became particularly closely associated with the so-called "Blitzen Benz", which made its public debut in 1909. In April 1911 a Blitzen Benz driven by Bob Burman on the sands of Daytona Beach, averaging 228.1 kilometres per hour (141.7 mph) over a full mile. This represented a world land-speed record: it would remain unbroken till February 1919.

Like many pioneering engineers involved in the early decades of the automobile age in Europe, Nibel was also sometimes mentioned in news reports as a racing driver. However, when he did appear behind the wheel in a competitive event it was more often than not in the context not of an out an out speed trial, but of an endurance event such as the "Prince Heinrich Rally" or the "Carpathian Rally". Trophies collected by Nibel through his participation in motor sport included, in 1909, the Prize of the Crown Princess of Saxony following success, driving a Benz 20/35 PS in that year's "Prince Heinrich Rally", the "Silver Plate" for his performance in the 1912 "International Austrian Alpine Rally", and in 1914 the "Prize of the Minister for the Interior" following the "Carpathian Rally". Beyond the world of motorsport in 1912/13 Benz & Cie AG was awarded and received the prestigious (and lucrative) "Kaiserpreis" ("Emperor's Prize for the best German aircraft engine"), which was widely interpreted by colleagues and commentators as a personal achievement for Hans Nibel and his senior engineers.

=== Top management ===
Hans Nibel's succession of achievements at the design office between 1904 was reflected in a series of promotions within the company hierarchy. In December 1911 or 1913 he was appointed a company "Prokurist", a senior management role conferring a significant measure of contractual capacity on the company's behalf.

War broke out in July 1914. As head of the design office Nibel had to make drastic changes at the company's premises in Mannheim-Waldhof and Gaggenau in order to adapt production to the needs of the military and at the same time to implement a large number of new development projects. On 16 August 1917, recognising his very considerable contribution to guiding the firm through the difficult war years, contribution, the company appointed him to a deputy membership on the company board of directors. During this time he was working with the Prosper L'Orange "oil-burner engines" (better viewed, in retrospect, as early forms of diesel engines), progressing to the point at which, soon after the war ended, Benz were already able to deliver simple engines as early as 1919, using this technology, for small industrial and agricultural engines . Another important development came in 1920 when Nibel, whose woe design efforts were still largely focused on racing cars at this stage, mandated Kurt Eltze (1878–1973) to set up the company's own production facility for injection pumps and nozzles to deal with "heavy fuel oil". Together the two men played a central role in turning "Benz and Cie AG" and its successor "Daimler-Benz AG" into world-leading pioneers in the use of diesel fuel for road vehicles. In 1922 Benz & Cie introduced a farm tractor with a self-combusting (through compression-induced spontaneous combustion) engine. It was the first road-capable diesel powered vehicle in the world. In 1923, under Nibel's direction, the first diesel powered road-going truck was presented by Benz. For the rest of his life and career he worked to sustain the company's pre-eminence in respect of diesel technology for road vehicles.

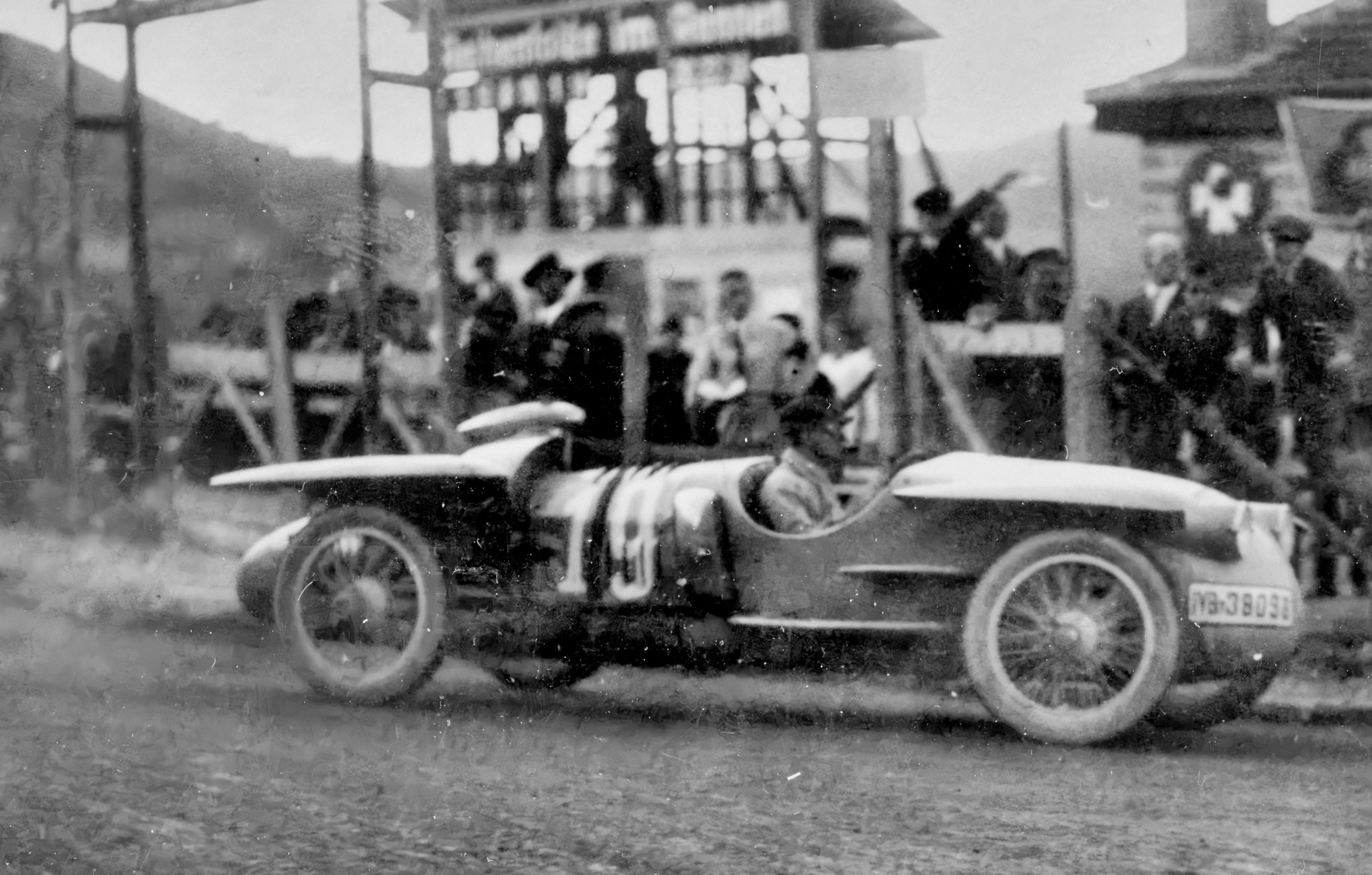
Benz Tropfenwagen racing in 1925 at Solituderennen, Stuttgart

In September 1921, the Berlin AVUS opened, and the innovative Rumpler Tropfenwagen was at the Berlin Motor Show. This "Tear-drop car" pioneered "streamlining". Underneath the pioneering body shape there was more innovation, notably the "Rear mid-engine, rear-wheel-drive layout", which in this case involved positioning the engine within the wheelbase behind the passenger compartment, with the driver placed in center front behind a curved wind screen. Nibel acquired a licence for the design from Rumpler that featured a (relatively conventional) rigid front axle, but matched up with Independent suspension rear wheels.

It was in 1922 that Nibel teamed up with his head of chassis design, Max Wagner, to produce the so-called "Benz-Tropfenwagen" race cars, that were open top and much lower than the tall Rumpler. Using a 2 litre engine without supercharger in the 1923 Italian Grand Prix, they finished 4th. The Benz-Tropfenwagen ensured international racing successes in the immediate time and placed Benz at the forefront of automobile chassis design during the years that followed.

On 25 August 1922 Hans Nibel, who had been a deputy member of the company's main board since 1917, became a full board member. This was also the year in which the institution known at that time as the "Technische Hochschule," (Karlsruhe Institute of Technology) awarded him an honorary doctorate (Dr. Ing. h. c.) "in recognition of his great contributions to design/development and technology ("... in Anerkennung seiner großen Verdienste als Konstrukteur und Techniker").

=== Merger ===
May 1924 saw the establishment of the "Interessengemeinschaft Daimler Motoren-Gesellschaft und Benz & Cie“, a joint enterprise comprising the two companies "Benz and Cie AG" and "Daimler-Benz AG". There were many who saw the move as a precursor to fuller merger between the two companies, but there was also a tradition of rivalry to be taken into account. At the board level Hans Nibel was among the first to become convinced of the desirability of a full merger, and he was one of the most vigorous proponents of such a move. In this context it is unsurprising that he was appointed at once to the executive board of the newly created joint enterprise business. Meanwhile an effective programme of standardisation in respect of car design and production technologies was launched in order to enable Benz and Daimler models to compete more effectively in a crowded market place. Purchasing and sales activities were also harmonised, along with advertising, although at this stage each of the two brands retained a separate trade mark. The design and development offices were also merged. Nibel found himself working, as a colleague with his counterpart from Daimler, the brilliant - if, on occasion, "difficult" - Dr. Porsche. Somewhat confusingly, sources state that the two men worked "gleichberechtigt" (at the same level of authority) within the corporate structure although Porsche (who was five years older than Nibel), nevertheless "carried ultimate responsibility" for the department. It was only in 1926 that Nibel moved his own office from Mannheim-Waldhof to the (now shared) design and development office at Untertürkheim.

The merger between "Benz and Cie AG" and "Daimler-Benz AG" was finally concluded two years later, formally on 28 June 1926. The merger had been masterminded and choreographed by Wilhelm Kissel, who came from the commercial and administrative side of "Benz and Cie AG". Now even the trade mark - the "three pointed star" - was shared. From the operational side of the business Hans Nibel, whose enthusiasm for the merger had never dimmed, was naturally a founder board member of the new company, Daimler-Benz AG.

In 1928 Nibel became head of the company's design and development department. As Technical Director, Dr. Porsche was still senior to Nibel in terms of the company hierarchy, and there are indications that there was, at times, a certain friction between the two of them. Nevertheless, their strengths were in many ways complementary; and the period between 1926 and 1929, during which they both worked at Daimler-Benz, was a time of remarkable achievement for the company in terms of product development. In 1927, working with Fritz Nallinger, Nibel was able to bring to market the first Mercedes-Benz six-cylinder indirect injection diesel engine to the commercial vehicle market. At around the same time he also initiated the introduction of an oil-based thinning agent to diesel fuel to try and address the issues arising from the "waxing" problem that can affect diesel fuel in the cold temperatures to be encountered, especially on mountain roads, during the winter season.

=== Technical director ===
Ferdinand Porsche's relations with senior colleagues on the board remained uncomfortable. Sources differ as to whether he resigned or was sacked. In any event, at the beginning of January 1929 Hans Nibel took over the position of Technical Director. By this time he had already started work with Max Wagner on a new generation of car designs featuring a Tiefbett ("Underslung") chassis in place of the traditional Hochbett ("Overslung") one, which would provide for a lowered centre of gravity, resulting in better road holding, and allowing for a more fashionably "streamlined" body shape. There were also claims that production costs were reduced. Some sources indicate that Nibel's enthusiasm for lowered and more "streamlined" car designs was inspired by his experiences of the 1922 "Benz-Tropfenwagen". Through the 1930s Adler and Opel would follow the company in adopting the Tiefbett ("Underslung") chassis, but during Nibel's time it was something in respect of which Daimler-Benz were leading the pack.

The first (relatively) mass-market model featuring the new approach was the 1,692cc Mercedes-Benz W15, finalised in 1930 and launched in the market place as the "Mercedes-Benz Typ 170" in 1931. The car was commercially successful, helped by claims that it delivered a 20% improvement in fuel economy when compared to its taller and heavier predecessor, the technical performance which had also, during the previous five years, greatly benefitted from Nibel's inputs. The new "Typ 170" featured a number of other firsts on which the company took out valuable patents, including an early form if independent suspension and a "Schnellganggetriebe" (form of "overdrive") which made it easier for drivers to reduce engine speeds - and thereby fuel consumption - at higher cruising speeds, on flatter roads on which maximising torque was less of a priority. In terms of market coverage, by extending the range of passenger cars half a class downwards, the W15 gave the company access to a far larger number of potential customers than less fleet-footed rival manufacturers of luxury cars. Having lost the services of Ferdinand Porsche, with his radical ideas for a cheap to manufacture rear-engined passenger car, the company nevertheless steered clear of the small car market which was dominated during the early 1930s by DKW and Opel. For small cars unit profitability remained vanishingly low and, at least till the middle part of the decade, the volumes necessary to secure acceptable overall margins were not available in the German market. Thanks to the strategic model-policy decisions taken during the early 1930s, "Daimler-Benz AG" would emerge at the end of the decade in far better shape financially than most of the domestically owned German auto industry. Nibel was naturally closely engaged in the development of the company's sporting and luxury cars such as the many high-powered sports cars in the "S-Series" (W06) of the period some of which achieved sporting success in competitive events while others found significant commercial success domestically and in export markets. He also took a leading role in guiding the design and development of the so-called "Großer Mercedes" launched in its original form 1930, which attracted widespread attention internationally despite selling in relatively small volumes.

The success of the "Typ 170" provided impetus for the launch in 1933 and commercial success of the "Typ 200" (W21) and "Typ 290" (W18) in 1933, larger family cars, designed and developed under Nibel's close direction, which incorporated many of the innovations pioneered in the "Typ 170". More innovation at the top end of the range came with the "Typ 380" (W22), unveiled at the Berlin Motor Show in February 1933. A heavy-weight "money no object" luxurious sports tourer, costing between three and four (or more) times as much as the "Typ 170", depending on specifications. Buyers wanting to maximise performance could specify a "Kompressor" (a form of super-charger). The car had been conceived by Dr. Porsche, but most of its development took place, under Nibel's aegis, after Porsche had left the company. Only 154 of the cars were produced during a two year production run, but its reputational benefits for the Mercedes-Benz brand, both at the time and subsequently, were very considerable. The "Kompressor" technology, previously reserved for light-weight racing cars, would also prove to be of lasting value, not leastly for the (significantly more powerful, faster, and more expensive still) "Typ 500K" (W18) offered by the company between 1934 and 1939.

The rear-engined "Typ 130" (W23) introduced in February 1934 and listed in sales material till 1936 was as revolutionary as any of the passenger cars introduced by Daimler-Benz on Nibel's watch. The idea had almost certainly originated with Dr. Porsche who had remained influential in the auto industry following his own departure from the company in 1929. Placing the engine at the same end of the car as the driving wheels implied the possibility of a simplified drive-train with resulting reductions in productions costs and vehicle weight. Traction on slippery roads was improved and there were those who argued that the configuration could be more space-efficient. The "Typ 130" bore Nibel's signature in respect of much of the detailed design and development work. The mid-engined "Typ 130" (W30) unveiled during the summer of 1934 and the rear-engined "Typ 170H" (W28), offered for sale between 1936 and 1939, built on the pioneering ideas of the "Typ 130", and despite Nibel's own sudden death at the end of 1934, the timelines involved in putting new models into production in a pre-computer age means that assertions by admirers that these later models should also be seen as part of Nibel's formidable portfolio are entirely plausible. Commercially the rear-ended Mercedes-Benz models offered during the 1930s were unsuccessful: car buyers and those charged with maintenance and servicing of the cars preferred the in many ways less ambitious and more familiar technical solutions used for the popular "Typ 170V" (W136), which also carried all the hallmarks of a Nibel design. And despite it conventional front-engined lay-out the "Typ 170V" boasted a number of pioneering features of its own, including the light-weight but exceptionally rigid X-form oval-tube chassis. As technical masterpieces and showcases for the post-war future of the auto industry the rear-engined Mercedes-Benz models of the 1930s were nevertheless extremely important.

As Technical director Nibel found time to continue applying his abilities to racing car design. One of his last racing cars is perhaps also his best remembered. Designed for the newly instigated 750 kg class, the "W25", with independent suspension all round and with Rudolf Caracciola and Luigi Fagioli at the wheel, was conspicuous among the star performers of the 1934 Grand Prix season. Nibel was responsible for the overall project while much of the chassis development was entrusted to Max Wagner. Albert Heeß and Otto Schilling focused on creating the car's engine. The W25 continued to participate for two more years (though by the time of its replacement for 1937 it was widely perceived as having become outclassed in terms of sheer race-track performance). The W25 is remembered with affection by enthusiasts as the first of the "Silver Arrow" racing cars from Mercedes-Benz.

The Mercedes-Benz "Typ 260D" (W138) first appeared in public at the closing hour on the company's show stand only at the February 1936 Berlin motor show: it went on sale only some months later, around two years after Nibel's death. Commentators nevertheless accord to Nibel much of the credit for developing the car. He had completed a lot of the detailed work in it by the end of 1934. As the progenitor of nearly a century's worth of diesel powered Mercedes-Benz taxis the W138 was, even for Nibel, an exceptionally influential design, incorporating within its substantial in-line six cylinder diesel power unit an early Bosch Fuel injection system. Despite its substantial weight and high purchase price, almost 2,000 of these cars were sold between 1936 and 1941. Fuel consumption was strikingly better than that achieved by similarly sized petrol/gasoline powered models: the car was and is widely considered to have been one of Nibel's most significant achievements, both in its own terms and in terms of what it adumbrated in respect of the diesel powered Mercedes-Benz passenger cars - still including many snapped up by the taxi trade - which returned to the market after the World War II. For those with a taste for history, there was in addition much about the car which could be traced back directly to the diesel-powered agricultural vehicles on which Nibel had already worked as head of design and development for "Benz and Cie AG" during the early 1920s.

As Technical Director Nibel continued to engage with the development work in the Daimler-Benz air engine division. However, sources - whether in English or in German - that focus on Mercedes-Benz aero engines tend to be preoccupied with the war years, concentrating on the ten years after Nibel's death. It is known that one of the projects on which he signed off during the final year of his life was the LZ 129, the first diesel engine to be designed expressly for, and mounted in, an airship.

=== Death ===
The following tribute appeared shortly after Hans Nibel died on behalf of Daimler-Benz:
"With the loss of Dr. Hans Nibel, Daimler-Benz AG loses an outstanding designer and a distinguished engineer of international renown. His creativity as a designer and technical develop of automobiles became a challenging benchmark for car designers and developers across the entire world .... You can hardly discuss the huge success of diesel engined passenger cars, of independent suspension designs incorporating swing axles, of overdrive transmissions, of contemporary car bodies and engines, without mentioning [Nibel's] name [and pre-eminence in connection with these developments]."
"Mit Herrn Dr. Hans Nibel verliert die Daimler-Benz AG einen hervorragenden Konstrukteur und bedeutenden Techniker von internationalem Ruf und Rang, dessen konstruktive Schöpferarbeit Musterbeispiel für die technische Entwicklung des Automobil- und Motorenbaus der ganzen Welt gewesen ist“ – so beschrieb das Unternehmen in einem Nachruf Hans Nibel und fasst wesentliche Verdienste zusammen: „Man kann kaum von dem großen Erfolg des Fahrzeug-Dieselmotors, den unabhängig gefederten Rädern, von Schwingachsen, von Schnellganggetrieben, von neuzeitlichen Karosserie- und Motorenbau sprechen, ohne dass nicht sein Name an erster Stelle genannt werden muss."

On 25 November 1934, as he was about to board a fast train at the main station in Stuttgart, Hans Nibel suffered a sudden and fatal heart attack. He had been on his way to Berlin in order to plan for the company's 1935 racing season. News of his unexpected death was greeted with shock followed by warm tributes. He had nevertheless been a consummate team worker, and for a number years senior members of the Design and Development department followed his approach and completed projects which Nibel had set in motion. Nibel's immediate successor as Technical Director was Max Sailer, a one-time racing driver whose contributions as Technical Director are principally reckoned in terms of the company's motor sport successes during the later 1930s. In 1941, still aged only 59, Sailer retired, reportedly on health grounds, having made relatively little impact on the company's core automobile manufacturing business, which less than one year later was abandoned completely in order that the factory could concentrate on war production. Sailer's successor, Fritz Nallinger, was an engineer by training and background who had worked closely with Nibel as a younger man. Nallinger would preside, between 1945 and 1965, over a period of product-led recovery from war and commercial achievement.

Hans Nibel's body was buried in the "Pragfriedhof" (cemetery) on the north side of Stuttgart.
