= Unimog 70200 =

German tractor

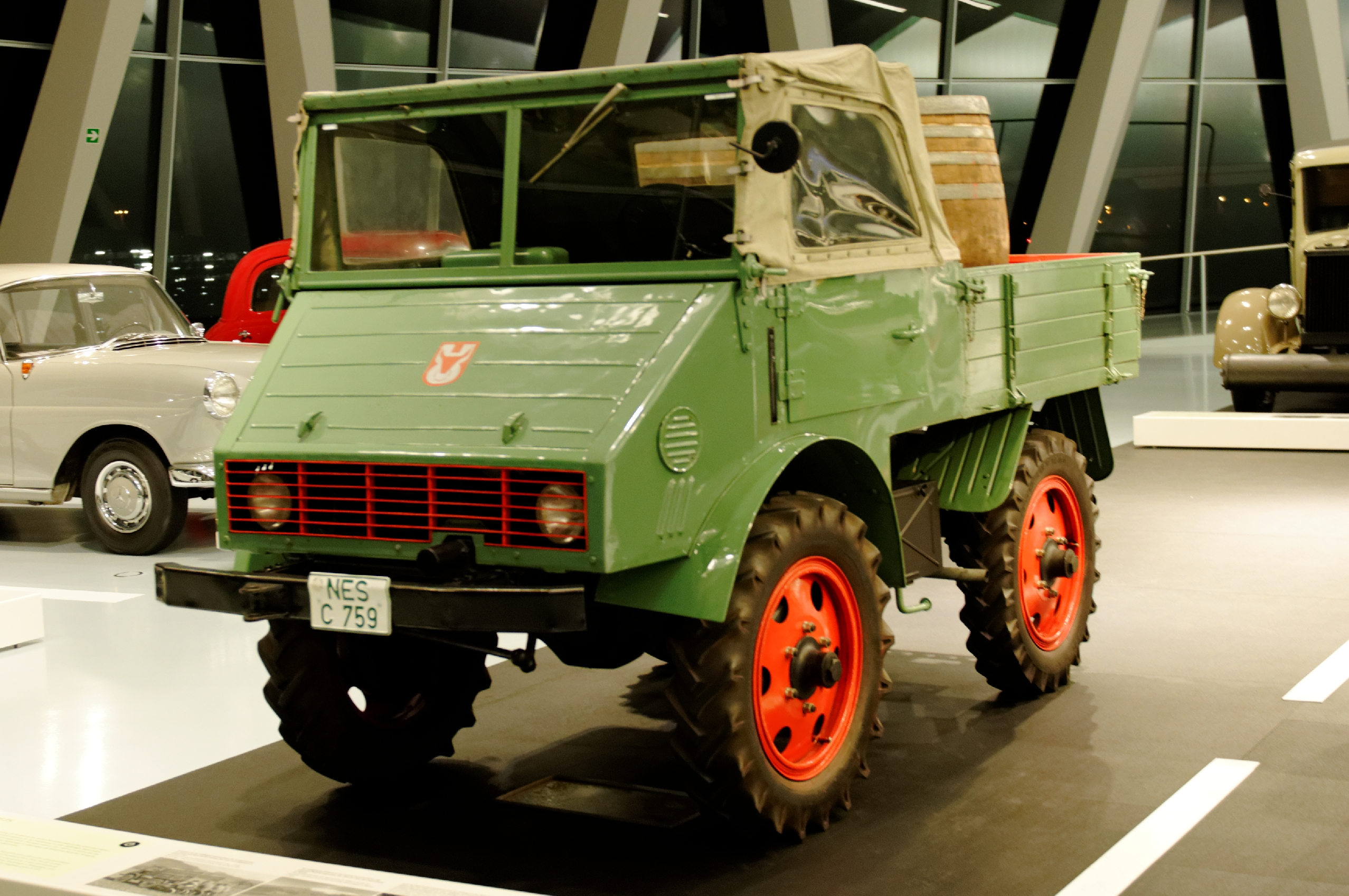
- A Unimog 70200 on display in the Mercedes-Benz Museum

Overview
- Type: Tractor
- Manufacturer: Boehringer
- Also called: Unimog, Boehringer
- Production: June 1948 – April 1951
- Assembly: Germany: Göppingen
- Designer: Albert Friedrich

Powertrain
- Engine: OM 636 (Diesel, 18.4 kW or 24.7 hp or 25.0 PS)
- Transmission: 6-speed manual gearbox, two reverse gears

Dimensions
- Wheelbase: 1,720 mm (67.7 in)
- Length: 3,520 mm (138.6 in)
- Width: 1,630 mm (64.2 in)
- Height: 2,020 mm (79.5 in)
- Kerb weight: 1,775 kg (3,913 lb)

Chronology
- Predecessor: none
- Successor: Unimog 2010

The Unimog 70200 is the first series production model of the Unimog series, made by Gebr. Boehringer. It was manufactured in Boehringer's Göppingen plant from June 1948 to April 1951. In total, 600 units of the 70200 were made. Manufacture of the Unimog was sold to Daimler-Benz in October 1950, where it was modified for mass production. The mass-production optimised Unimog is known as Unimog 2010.

The Unimog 70200 name was chosen because of Boehringer's cost centre. All Unimog 70200 vehicle identification numbers begin with 70200. Minuscules were used to differentiate between certain models. It is said that approximately 100–120 Unimog 70200s have been preserved.

== History ==
=== Development ===
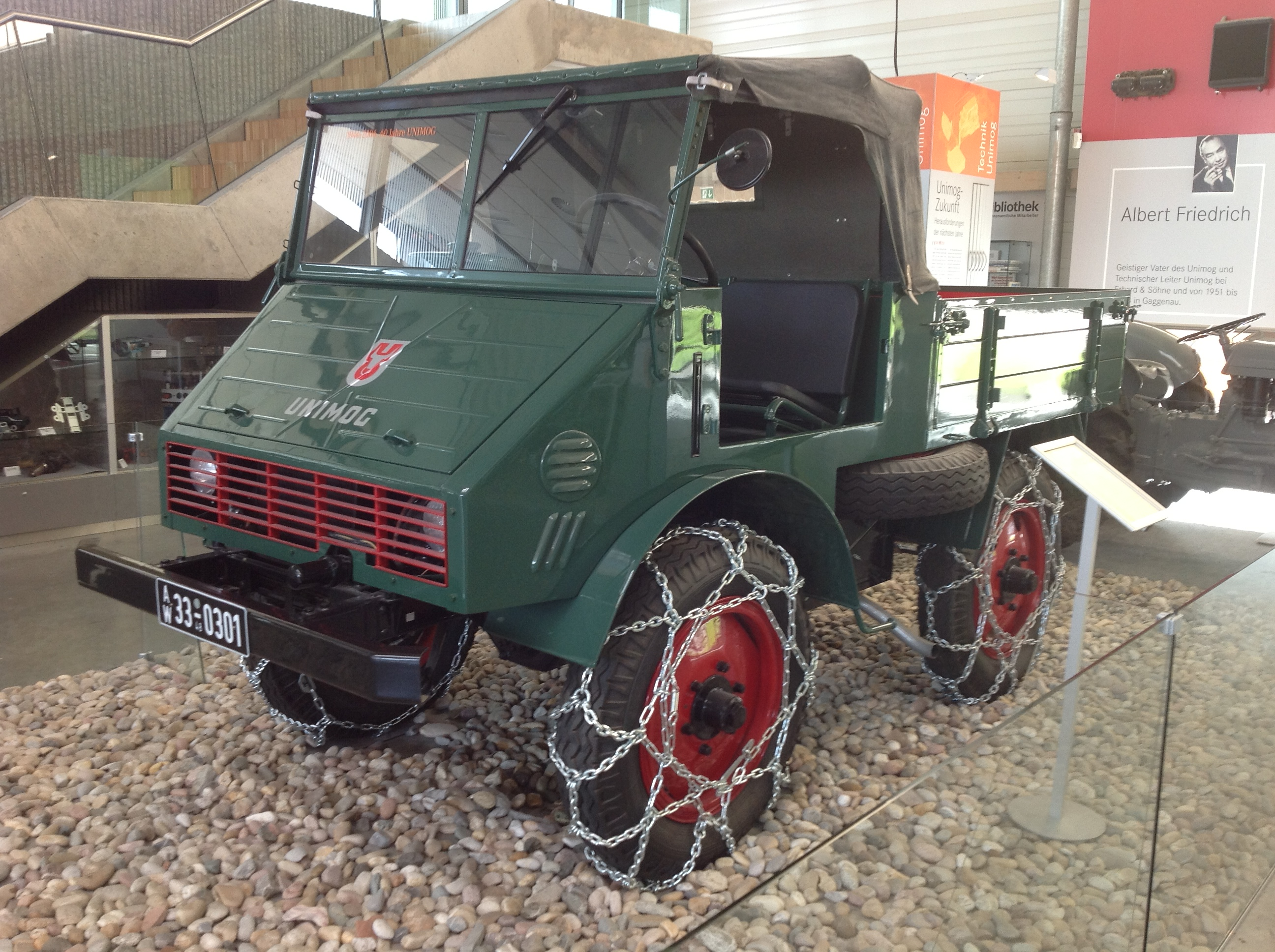
Unimog U 6 prototype on display in the Unimog museum in Gaggenau

The Unimog 70200 was invented by German engineer Albert Friedrich, who worked as an aircraft engine designer with Daimler-Benz during World War II. After the Morgenthau Plan was published, Friedrich decided to develop an agricultural vehicle, in case post-war Germany would become an agricultural country. Friedrich considered a vehicle similar to an agricultural tractor – with a hitch and PTOs – but much more capable offroad, and equipped with all-wheel drive. Furthermore, a canvas roof and a flatbed were key elements of Friedrich's design. To reach a top speed of 50 km/h (31 mph), Friedrich considered a power output of 25 PS (18.4 kW; 24.7 hp) sufficient.

The earliest plans were conceptualised in late 1945; in November that year, a production order was granted by the US Military Administration, meaning that it was officially believed that the vehicle would not have any military purpose. Friedrich was eventually allowed to develop the vehicle, and permission was granted to build ten prototypes. For this purpose, Friedrich signed a development contract with Erhard & Söhne, a jewelry factory from Schwäbisch Gmünd, which at that time produced gold and silver handicrafts. Two engineers were assigned to the project, but in January 1946, a third engineer, Heinrich Rößler, joined the team. Heinrich Rößler, also a former Daimler-Benz employee, carried out the main development work. He later became the head of Unimog development at Daimler-Benz.

The first technical drawings were completed in March 1946. Rößler put a lot of emphasis on the functionality of the vehicle; for instance, the track width measures 50 in (1,270 mm), which equals two rows of potatoes. Both the front and rear axles are live axles with reduction gears. They are technically identical, welded together from just two preformed metal panels each, and have only four drive joints. This design made the axles simple and cheap to produce. Later plans also included differential locks for the axles and the gearbox, and coil springs with hydraulic shock absorbers instead of leaf springs for the suspension.

=== First prototypes and engine development ===
The first prototypes were completed in late 1946 at Erhard & Söhne. They were fitted with the M 136 Otto engine. The first four prototypes were either destroyed or lost. On 9 October 1946, the first test drive with the vehicle was conducted. Later that year, the vehicle was presented to experts and engineers. Hans Zabel, and engineer who worked on the project, coined the acronym "Unimog" by making a note on one of the drawings; Zabel called the vehicle an "Universal-Motor-Gerät" (Universal-Motor-Gadget), which lead to the Unimog name. On 20 November 1946, the name was officially adopted. Later, the U 5 and U 6 prototypes were made at the Boehringer plant in Göppingen. These are the oldest known Unimogs, and they were already equipped with the OM 636 Diesel engine from the factory. Since its restoration, the U 5 prototype has been on static display at the agricultural museum of the University of Hohenheim, whereas the U 6 prototype has been on display at the Unimog museum in Gaggenau.

Daimler-Benz had successfully brought the Mercedes-Benz OM 138 Diesel engine for passenger cars to market in the mid-1930s. Development of a successor to this engine started in the days of World War II. In 1948, said successor was ready for mass production, but Mercedes-Benz passenger cars were not yet scheduled to be equipped with this engine. In 1947, Unimog engineers had decided to abandon the M 136 Otto engine and to use a Diesel engine instead for the series production Unimog. As they had a good relationship with Daimler-Benz, the engineers decided to use the OM 138's successor, which at the time was still in development. This is the reason why the OM 138's successor – known as OM 636 – was already used in pre-series production Unimogs prior to its 1949 introduction in Mercedes-Benz passenger cars.

=== Manufacture at Boehringer and sale of Unimog ===
The official Unimog presentation was held in 1947. Erhard & Söhne was not able to mass-produce the Unimog, which is why Gebr. Boehringer in Göppingen was awarded a manufacturing contract. This allowed Boehringer, originally a tool manufacturer, to avoid allied dismantling. Erhard & Söhne became a supplier for Unimog production. Pre-series production finally started in 1948; the same year, the Unimog was exhibited by Mercedes-Benz at the DLG-exhibition in Frankfurt, with 150 orders for the Unimog placed. The first patent for the Unimog's portal axles was filed on 21 November 1948 under the 950 430 patent number. Series production was started in February 1949.

Boehringer did not use modern methods of mass production, instead, all Unimogs were solely built by hand. Starting in 1949, 90 additional employees worked on the Unimog project, and a sales and distribution network as well as a customer service team were established. The highest monthly production rate at the time was 50 units per month. This was insufficient to meet customer demands, and it was foreseeable that Boehringer would be incapable of manufacturing the Unimog over a long period of time. Therefore, Unimog was sold to Daimler-Benz in October 1950. Production in Göppingen ceased by April 1951. Then, production was moved over to the Mercedes-Benz plant in Gaggenau. Production of the 70200's successor, the Unimog 2010, began in June 1951. Erhard & Söhne, who manufactured the Unimog axles, remained a supplier for Daimler-Benz until 1963.

== Technical description ==
The Unimog 70200 is a compact tractor, measuring approximately 3.5 metres (11 ft 5 3/4 in) in length. It has four wheels of the same size, four hydraulic brakes, a ladder frame made of U-shaped sections, and front and rear live axles with portal gears and bolted axle covers. The axles are coil sprung, and fitted with hydraulic shock absorbers. The suspension uses torque tubes, transverse links, and panhard rods. The tyres are multi purpose (6.5 – 18 in): designed for both on-road and off-road use.

The Unimog 70200 uses an OM 636.912 passenger car engine. The OM 636 is a straight-four, water-cooled, naturally aspirated precombustion chamber, diesel engine with overhead valves with a displacement of 1.7 litres (100 cu in) and developing 25 PS (18 kW; 25 hp). The engine is installed longitudinally, slightly inclined, and has an electric starter motor. Unlike the following OM 636 family engines, the OM 636.912 has two valve covers.

The gearbox is a constant mesh gearbox with six forward and two reverse gears, allowing a speed range of 1–50 km/h (0.62–31.07 mph). The rear axle is permanently driven; when front-wheel drive is enabled – which does not require depressing the clutch pedal – different amounts of torque are sent to the front axle and rear axle.

== Bibliography ==
- Lutz Nellinger: Der Unimog: Arbeitstier und Kultmobil. Komet, Köln 2016, ISBN 978-3-86941-581-9.
- Carl-Heinz Vogler: Unimog 411: Typengeschichte und Technik. GeraMond, München 2014, ISBN 978-3-86245-605-5.
- Carl-Heinz Vogler: Typenatlas Unimog. Alle Unimog-Klassiker seit 1946 bis 1993. GeraMond, München 2015, ISBN 978-3-86245-026-8.
