= Olšany (Šumperk District) =

- Municipality
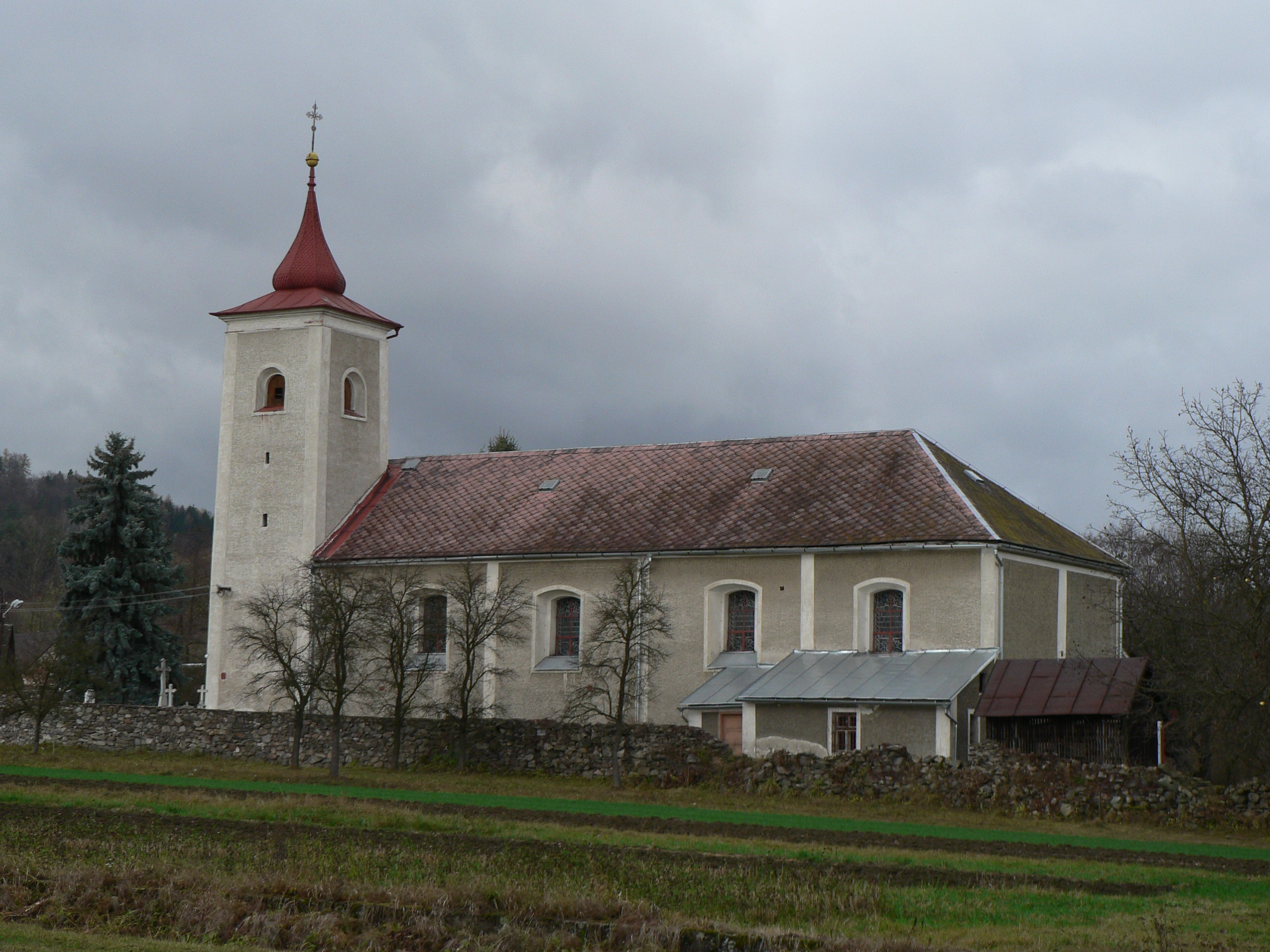
- Church of the Annunciation of the Virgin Mary

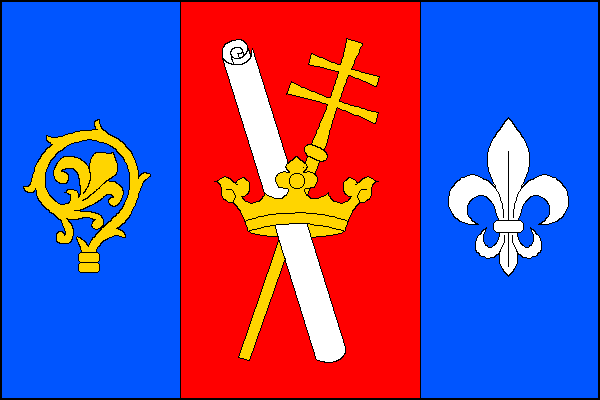
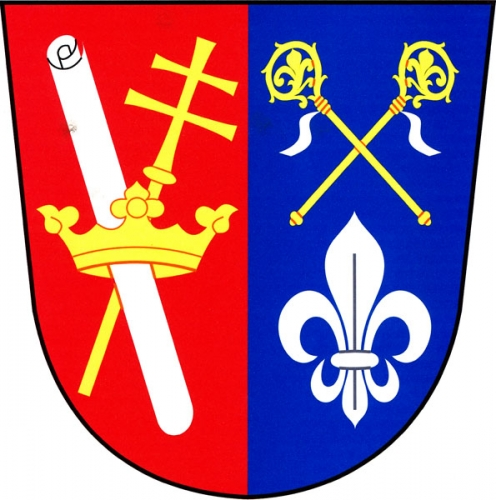
- Flag Coat of arms

- Location in the Czech Republic
- Coordinates: 49°57′54″N 16°51′32″E
- Country: Czech Republic
- Region: Olomouc
- District: Šumperk
- First mentioned: 1349

Area
  - Total: 6.50 km^{2} (2.51 sq mi)
- Elevation: 324 m (1,063 ft)

Population (2026-01-01)
  - Total: 1,017
  - Density: 156/km^{2} (405/sq mi)
- Time zone: UTC+1 (CET)
  - Summer (DST): UTC+2 (CEST)
- Postal code: 789 62
- Website: www.olsany.cz

Olšany (German: Olleschau) is a municipality and village in Šumperk District in the Olomouc Region of the Czech Republic. It has about 1,000 inhabitants.

== Administrative division ==
Olšany consists of two municipal parts (in brackets population according to the 2021 census):

- Olšany (808)
- Klášterec (215)

== Geography ==
Olšany is located about 8 kilometres (5 mi) west of Šumperk and 49 km (30 mi) northwest of Olomouc. The municipal territory extends into three geomorphological regions: the western part lies in the Zábřeh Highlands, the middle part lies in the Mohelnice Depression, and a small part in the north lies in the Hanušovice Highlands. The highest point is at 601 m (1,972 ft) above sea level.

The village lies in the valley on the right bank of the Morava River. The streams Bušínský potok and Kamenný potok flow through the municipality.

== History ==
The first written mention of Olšany is from 1386, referring to a local landowner Bolík of Olšany. Klášterec was first mentioned in 1349.

A factory producing cigarette paper was established in 1862 and significantly changed the municipality's rural character. It also caused steep growth of population.

In 1980, Klášterec was joined to Olšany.

== Demographics ==
Historical population

Year	Pop.	±%
1869	616	—
1880	601	−2.4%
1890	656	+9.2%
1900	722	+10.1%
1910	859	+19.0%

Year	Pop.	±%
1921	811	−5.6%
1930	908	+12.0%
1950	818	−9.9%
1961	936	+14.4%
1970	903	−3.5%

Year	Pop.	±%
1980	1,014	+12.3%
1991	1,105	+9.0%
2001	1,133	+2.5%
2011	1,073	−5.3%
2021	1,023	−4.7%

Source: Censuses

== Economy ==
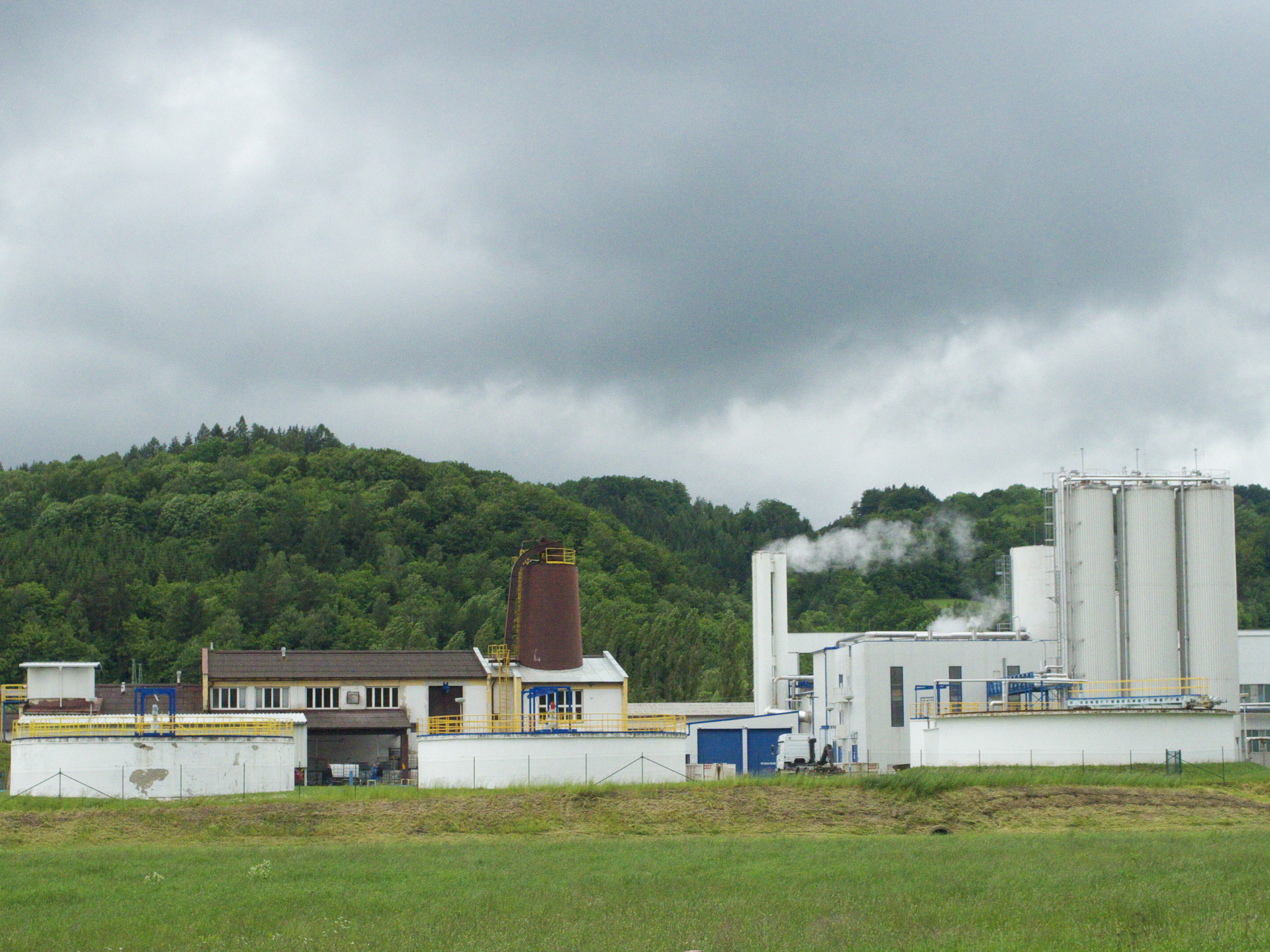
Cigarette paper factory

The cigarette paper factory is still in operation and is the main employer in Olšany. Its products are known under the brand Vážka.

== Transport ==
The I/11 road from Šumperk to Červená Voda runs through the municipality.

== Sport ==
In the municipality is a small ski resort with two ski lifts.

== Sights ==
The main landmark of Olšany is the Church of the Annunciation of the Virgin Mary. It has a well preserved Gothic core.

== Notable people ==
- Hans Nibel (1880–1934), German mechanical engineer
