= Unimog 2010 =

German truck

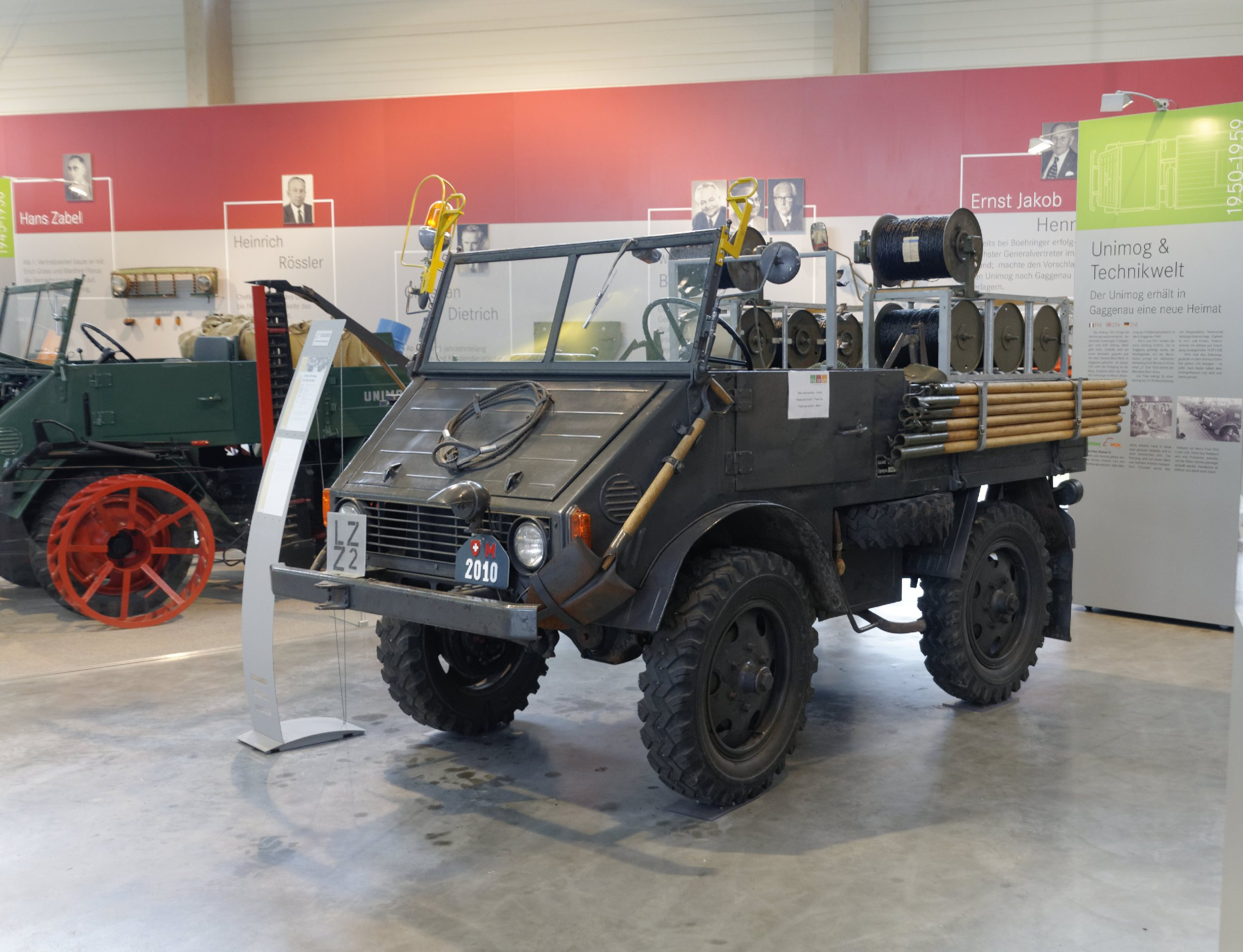

Overview
- Type: Tractor
- Manufacturer: Daimler-Benz AG
- Also called: Unimog
- Production: June 1951 – August 1953
- Assembly: Germany: Gaggenau (Mercedes-Benz Gaggenau plant)

Powertrain
- Engine: 1.7 L OM636.912 I4 (diesel) (1951–1952); 1.8 L OM636.914 I4 (diesel) (1952–1953)
- Transmission: 6-speed manual gearbox, two reverse gears

Dimensions
- Wheelbase: 1,720 mm (67.7 in)
- Length: 3,450 mm (135.8 in)
- Width: 1,630 mm (64.2 in)
- Height: 2,035 mm (80.1 in)
- Kerb weight: 1.7 t (1.67 long tons; 1.87 short tons)

Chronology
- Predecessor: Unimog 70200
- Successor: Unimog 401

The Unimog 2010 is a vehicle of the Unimog series made by German manufacturer Daimler-Benz from June 1951 to August 1953 in the Mercedes-Benz Gaggenau plant. It is a technical copy of its predecessor, the Unimog 70200. Despite being sold by Mercedes-Benz dealerships, the Unimog 2010 did not feature the brand's „Mercedes-star“ emblem. Instead, it was solely sold under the Unimog brand, having the ox-head-Unimog emblem on the bonnet; only vehicles purchased by the Swiss army lack the Unimog emblem and have no branding at all (as seen on the right). In total, 5,846 units were produced, and five different models were available. All Unimog 2010 vehicles have a wheelbase of 1,720 mm (67 3/4 in) and a canvas roof; a closed cab was not available as a factory option. The name „Unimog 2010“ originates from the German supply firm Erhard & Söhne, which manufactured the Unimog prototypes – all technical drawings, parts and tools of that firm had the part number 2010, which is said to be the reason why Daimler-Benz simply named the Unimog 2010. The Unimog 2010 was succeeded by the Unimog 401 in 1953.

Unimog emblem

== History ==
After the final development steps of the Unimog 70200 had been completed at Erhard & Söhne, production was carried out by Gebrüder Boehringer in their Göppingen plant starting in 1948. Boehringer, originally a tool manufacturer, was not experienced in the automotive field, and, therefore, all Unimogs were solely built by hand. This ineffective production process led to a production figure of roughly 25 to 30 units per month, which was not enough to accommodate demand, thus Boehringer sold the entire Unimog production to Daimler-Benz in late 1950. Production in Göppingen was halted in April 1951. During the following months, it was moved to Daimler-Benz' Mercedes-Benz Gaggenau plant. It was planned to start production in the Gaggenau plant in spring 1951, but during the process of creating a new production line for the Unimog, logistical problems occurred. The planned production figure of 170–180 units could not be reached. On 4 June 1951, makeshift production was started in the provisorily modified building 14 of the Gaggenau plant. This marked the introduction of the new name for the Unimog, 2010. After four weeks, the makeshift production was halted after series production could be started in the building 44 of the Gaggenau plant. Building 44 was equipped with the necessary tools, equipment and an assembly line.

Daimler-Benz engineers modified the original Unimog 70200 design: The mud guard wings were upgraded with a beading and the rear part of the bed frame was made with an edge rather than curved to ease production. Also, axle lids were now welded instead of held in place with screws. The original 1.7 L (104 cu in) Diesel engine OM 636.912 was used until 1952, when it was replaced with the 1.8 L (110 cu in) OM 636.914. The OM 636.914 has a modified cylinder head and valve cover. The 2010s successor Unimog 401 was presented on the DLG exhibition in Cologne in May 1953, and Unimog 2010 production was ceased in August 1953.

== Military use ==
Like its predecessor, the Unimog 2010 was also used as a military vehicle. Some Unimog 2010s were purchased by the French army, but most of the military Unimog 2010s were operated by the Swiss army, they purchased 540 units. In addition to 540 Unimog 2010s, they also had 44 Unimog 70200 in service. The Swiss army used their Unimog 2010s as artillery tractors, combat engineer vehicles and aircraft tractors. Being the smallest motor vehicle of the Swiss army, the Unimog 2010 received the nickname „Dieseli“. The Dieseli remained in service until 1989.

== Models ==
In total, there exist eight different models of the Unimog 2010, however, only five were ever built. The model number was added after a slash; military versions for the Swiss army received an additional M-letter.

Unimog 2010 models
Model	Equipment and options	Engine	Notes
2010/1	Base model with canvas roof	OM 636.912	as of 1952 OM 636.914
2010/2	Base model with canvas roof and trailer brake system	OM 636.914	
2010/3	Base model with canvas roof and PTO shafts	OM 636.914	
2010/4	Base model with canvas roof, trailer brake system and PTO shafts	OM 636.914	
2010/5	Base model with canvas roof, trailer brake system, PTO shafts and three-point linkage	OM 636.914	some vehicles also received the OM 636.912 engine
~~2010/6~~	Base model with canvas roof	OM 636.914	was never made
~~2010/7~~	Base model with canvas roof and pneumatic trailer brake system	OM 636.914	was never made
~~2010/8~~	Base model with canvas roof and two three-point linkages	OM 636.914	was never made

=== Production figures ===
Year	Production figures
1951	1005
1952	3799
1953	1042
Sum	5846

== Bibliography ==
- Carl-Heinz Vogler: Typenatlas Unimog. Alle Unimog-Klassiker seit 1946 bis 1993. GeraMond, München 2015, ISBN 978-3-86245-026-8, pp. 25
- Lutz Nellinger: Der Unimog: Arbeitstier und Kultmobil. Komet, Köln 2016, ISBN 978-3-86941-581-9.
