= Mercedes-Benz W15 =

Mercedes-Benz 170
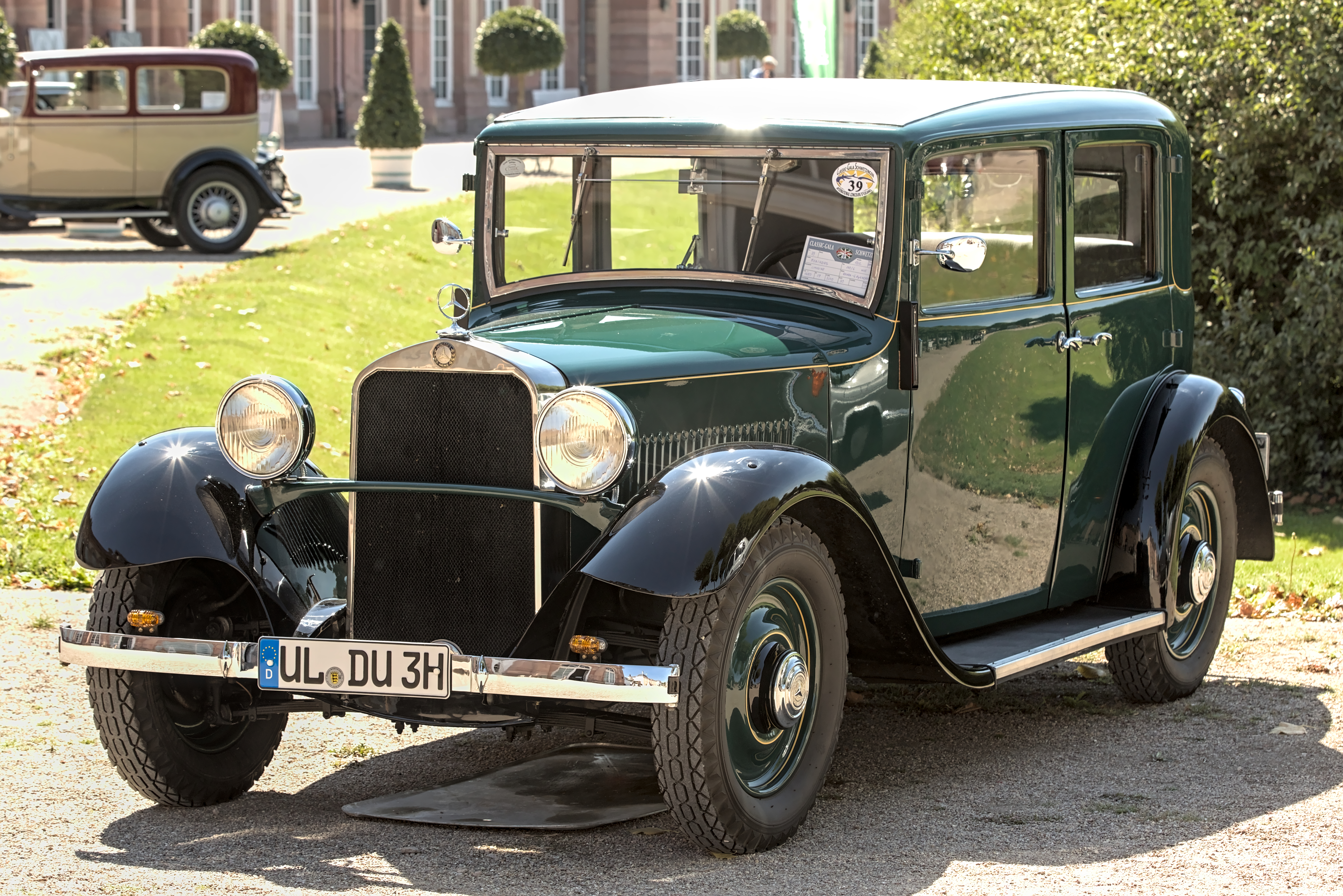
- Mercedes-Benz 170 (1932)

Overview
- Manufacturer: Mercedes-Benz
- Also called: Mercedes-Benz Typ(e) 170; Mercedes-Benz W15
- Production: 1931–1936; 13,775 units
- Assembly: Germany: Stuttgart

Body and chassis
- Class: Mid-size car
- Layout: FR layout

Powertrain
- Engine: 1,692cc M15 I6

Dimensions
- Wheelbase: 2,600 mm (100 in)
- Length: 3,940 mm (155 in)
- Width: 1,630 mm (64 in)
- Height: 1,650 mm (65 in)

Chronology
- Successor: Mercedes-Benz W136

The Mercedes-Benz W15 is an automobile produced by Mercedes-Benz from 1931 to 1936. Regarded today as a mid-size family car, it was given the chassis designation W15, and sold as the Typ 170 in four-door "Limousine" (sedan/saloon) and Cabriolet forms.

By 1934 differently configured cabriolets, a sports roadster, and a Kübelwagen (military light utility vehicle) were added to what had become for Mercedes an unusually a wide model range.

The Typ 170 made its debut at the Paris Motor Show in October 1931, where it was seen as the most important new model introduced that year. It was also the most significant creation of Hans Nibel, the manufacturer's high-profile Technical Director who had taken over the position from Ferdinand Porsche at the start of 1929. Though the Typ 170 was discontinued in 1936 with the introduction of its successor W136 170, a few sales continued through the first few months of 1937.

== A smaller Mercedes-Benz ==
With the economy still reeling from the successive after shocks that followed the Wall Street crash, Hans Nibel, the manufacturer's Technical Director, conceived of the 170 as a compact light-weight car. Mercedes-Benz had by then become known as a manufacturer of large expensive cars that tended to grow larger and less affordable with each upgrade: the 170 of 1931 represented a conscious strategy of broadening the range down market, a pattern that would be repeated with the 190 in 1982 and A-Class in 1997.

The 170 in bare chassis form, as delivered to a coach builder or the body shop, weighed 750 kg (1,653 lb). With a conventional coupé or sedan/saloon body added, the car weighed between 1,050 kg (2,315 lb) and 1,200 kg (2,646 lb), with a laden weight of around 1,455 kg (3,208 lb).

== Chassis ==
The 170 was the first Mercedes-Benz with all-round independent suspension. There was no full width axle at the front, the wheels being suspended from two transverse leaf springs. At the back there were two half swing-axles. The suspension layout, which minimized unsprung mass and provided a high level of stability, was subsequently introduced across the entire Mercedes-Benz range, giving the cars a quality of comfort and safety that competitors using the then common combination of rigid axles and leaf springing could not match.

The brakes, controlled via oil pressure, operated on all four wheels. An ignition steering lock was an anti-theft device which was incorporated as a standard feature.

Although both the innovative suspension and the compact chassis might have been seen as a gamble in 1931, their dependability and quality were reflected in the fact that they continued unchanged throughout the car's production run.

== Engine ==
The car was powered by a six-cylinder 1,692 cc engine: maximum power was set at 23.5 kW (32 PS; 32 hp) at 3,200 rpm. The engine featured central lubrication and the water-based cooling system for the engine employed both a pump and a thermostat. Power was transmitted to the rear wheels via what was in effect a four-speed manual transmission, on which the top gear operated as a form of overdrive. Third gear used the 1:1 ratio conventionally used by a top gear, and there was a fourth gear with a ratio of 1:0.73. Fuel economy was quoted as 11 litres per 100 kilometres (26 mpg_{‑imp}; 21 mpg_{‑US}) and top speed 90 km/h (56 mph), which combined to represent a competitive level of performance in the passenger car market of that time.

== Body options ==
At its 1931 launch the car was offered in bare chassis form (for customers wishing to purchase a car body from a coach builder) at a manufacturer's recommended price of 3,800 Reichsmark (RM), a four-door "Limousine" (sedan/saloon) for 4,400 RM or as a Cabriolet for 5,575 RM. Subsequently, differently configured cabriolets, a sports roadster and, for military use, a Kübelwagen were added to what was, by 1934, a wide range of standard body types offered.

Initially large luggage would need to be fastened to a rack on the outside of the car at the back. In 1934 the bodies for the two mainstays of the range, the four-door sedan/saloon and the "Cabriolet C", received new more "streamlined" bodies and sloping tails which incorporated an internal luggage compartment. 1934 also saw for the first time a two-door "Limousine" (sedan/saloon), closely resembling the four-door equivalent. The more streamlined bodies of the 170 saloon in 1934 suggested the form of the next generation of 170, the Mercedes-Benz W136 introduced in 1936. Its 2,845 mm (112.0 in) wheelbase carried the new look off better than the shorter 2,600 mm (100 in) wheelbase of the W15 170.

== Light van ==
At the start of 1932 the Mercedes-Benz Kastenwagen (light van) Typ L 300 joined the range. It shared the mechanical underpinnings of the 170 and could carry a load weighing up to 300 kg – hence the name.

== Commercial ==
In a period of economic crisis and shrinking incomes, the 170 and its van derivative enabled Mercedes-Benz to survive. The modern independent suspension layout and hydraulic brakes provided a comfortable and safe driving experience. Between 1931 and 1936 the firm produced 13,775 of the cars. The highest annual production total of 4,438 was achieved in 1932, early in the car's career, suggesting the Mercedes had correctly understood the German automobile market within which at this time virtually the entire production was sold. 1932 was a particularly poor year, so that the 170's sales in that year represented more than 10% of Germany's passenger car sales. Thereafter the German automobile market bounced back strongly as economy recovered, other manufacturers attracted customers with smaller lighter cars and the government, in 1933, abolished annual car tax, so that the 3,030 cars produced during 1935 which was the W15 170's last full year of production represented a market share of less than 2%.

The 170 continued to be offered until 1936 when it was replaced by the four cylinder 170V. It also provided much of the chassis-architecture for more powerful subsequent models such as the 200 model of 1933 and its successors.

== Sources and further reading ==
- Media related to Mercedes-Benz W15 at Wikimedia Commons
