= Klášterec (Olšany) =

Coordinates: 49°57′15″N 16°51′56″E

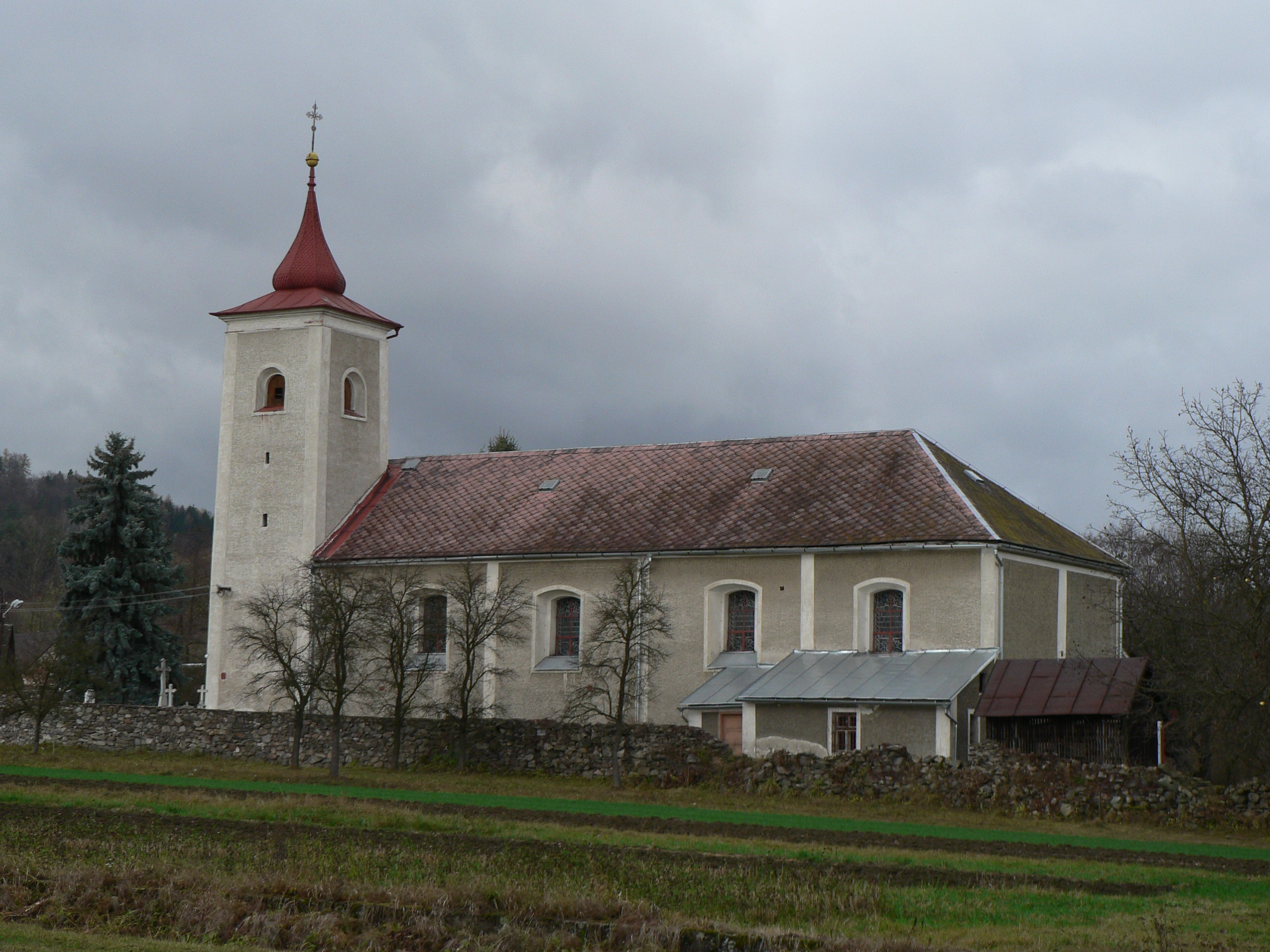
Church of the Annunciation of the Virgin Mary

Klášterec (German: German: Klösterle) is a village and administrative part of Olšany Municipality in Šumperk District in the Olomouc Region of the Czech Republic. The number of citizens was 225 in 2001.

== History ==
Events of the Thirty Years' War significantly reduced the population, leaving just nine inhabitants.

== Sights ==
A Benedictine convent, which is reflected in the village's name (klášter meaning "convent"), was established in the late 13th century. References to the convent have ceased since the 15th century, though the cause of termination is unknown. The heritage of the convent is a gothic church, which was later baroquely modified and had gothic cellars in the location of the current graveyard.

== Transport ==
The area is served by several bus lines.
