= Hans Scherenberg =

German automobile engineer and executive

Hans Scherenberg (born Dresden 28 October 1910, died Stuttgart 17 November 2000) was a German automobile engineer and executive.

After studying engineering at the Technische Hochschulen of Stuttgart and Karlsruhe, between 1930 and 1935, Scherenberg joined Daimler Benz AG as a research engineer. Here he worked on the development of the first petrol injected aircraft engine (The DB 601) which went into production in 1937. In 1942 he received his doctoral thesis from Stuttgart University for a work on "Valve control systems for four-stroke flight engines."

Following the Second World War the victorious war-time allies had enforced Daimler Benz AG a pause in engine fuel-injection development. Scherenberg moved to work with Adolf Schnürle's engineering consultancy, moving again in 1948 to join the Gutbrod company which had recently been taken on by Walter Gutbrod on the death of the founder Wilhelm Gutbrod. Under Scherenberg's leadership Gutbrod developed and brought to market the world's first production automobile fitted with a petrol injected engine. He returned to Daimler Benz AG in 1952. Following a promotion to the board of management in 1956, he was principally involved in the development of Daimler-Benz automatic transmission and fuel injection systems, which would remain areas of key strength for the company in later decades. After the retirement at the end of 1965 of Fritz Nallinger, Scherenberg took on overall responsibility for the company's Research and Development functions until his own retirement in 1977. He was succeeded by Werner Breitschwerdt.

In 1970 Scherenberg received an Honorary Doctorate from Technische Universität Berlin and in 1974 an Honorary Professorship from Stuttgart University. In 1981 he was awarded a Werner von Siemens Ring (a high-ranking award for technical sciences in Germany).

== Awards ==
- Wilhelm Exner Medal in 1977.

== Sources and further reading ==
- Kind, Dieter; Mühe, Walter: Naturforscher und Gestalter der Technik. Die Träger des Werner-von-Siemens-Ringes und ihre Leistungen für Naturwissenschaft und Technik. Düsseldorf: VDI-Verlag 1989. ISBN 3-18-400946-7 (Seite 174-180)
