= Mercedes-Benz 260 D =

Mercedes-Benz 260 D (W138)
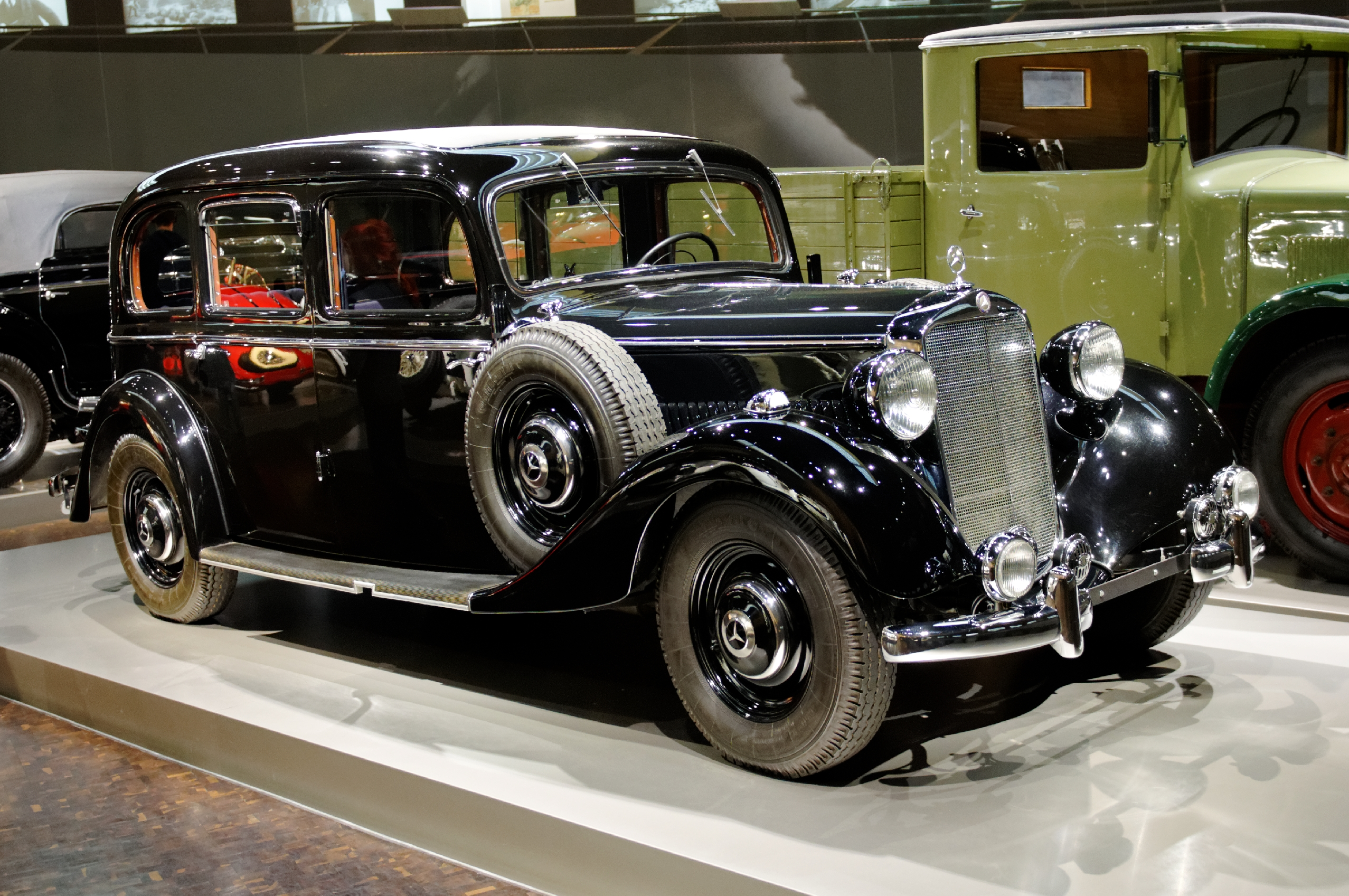

Overview
- Manufacturer: Mercedes-Benz
- Production: 1935–1940; 1,967 built

Body and chassis
- Class: Full-size sedan
- Body style: 4-door sedan landaulette cabriolet
- Layout: FR layout

Powertrain
- Engine: 2545 cc OM138 I4 diesel
- Transmission: three-speed gearbox with overdrive (Nullserie), four-speed with synchromesh on all ratios from 1937

Dimensions
- Wheelbase: 3,050 mm (120.1 in)
- Length: 4,390 mm (172.8 in)
- Width: 1,630 mm (64.2 in)
- Curb weight: 1,530 kg (3,373 lb)

Chronology
- Predecessor: Mercedes-Benz Stuttgart 260
- Successor: Mercedes-Benz 350SD

The Mercedes-Benz 260 D, coded Mercedes-Benz W 138 according to internal works designation, was the first passenger car with diesel engine in a series production. The 260 D was named in reference to its engine displacement. Nearly 2,000 vehicles were assembled until 1940 when the Daimler-Benz devoted itself almost entirely to military manufacture.

== Pilot series ==
An early attempt by Daimler-Benz to install a 6-cylinder diesel engine in a Mercedes-Benz Mannheim chassis ultimately failed due to its unacceptable vibration. 1935 saw the successful installation of the smaller OM 138, 2545 cc overhead valve, 4-cylinder engine in a Mercedes-Benz 230 (W21) chassis. It employed the Bosch diesel fuel injection system and produced 45 bhp (34 kW) at 3000 rpm. The car weighed approximately 1,530 kg (3,373 lb) and could attain a top speed of 95 km/h (59 mph). Branded as the 260 D, the car was introduced to the public at the 1936 Berlin Motor Show, although 13 pre-production units were produced the previous year. The car proved to be a good seller.

170 pullman-landaulets based on the W21 chassis were built from 1936 to 1937, called the Nullserie and used only as taxis, with a three-speed plus overdrive transmission, without synchromesh on the first gear.

== Second series ==
The second series was introduced in 1937, and included improvements from the Mercedes-Benz W143, with a four-speed fully synchronized transmission. The chassis was based on contemporary Mercedes technology and had transverse leaf spring independent front suspension and swing axles at the rear. The brakes were hydraulic. A range of body types were made including saloons, landaulettes and cabriolets. The car was noted at the time for its good fuel economy of 9 L/100 km (26 mpg_{‑US}), compared to 13 L/100 km (18 mpg_{‑US}) for its gasoline powered counterpart.

Production was stopped in 1939 as a result of World War II. After the war, the production of diesel engined cars was resumed with the Mercedes-Benz 170D in 1949. In total, 1,967 units of the 230 D were built since 1935.

A surviving example of the car is displayed at the Mercedes-Benz Museum in Stuttgart, Germany.
