= Fritz Nallinger =

German businessman (1898–1984)

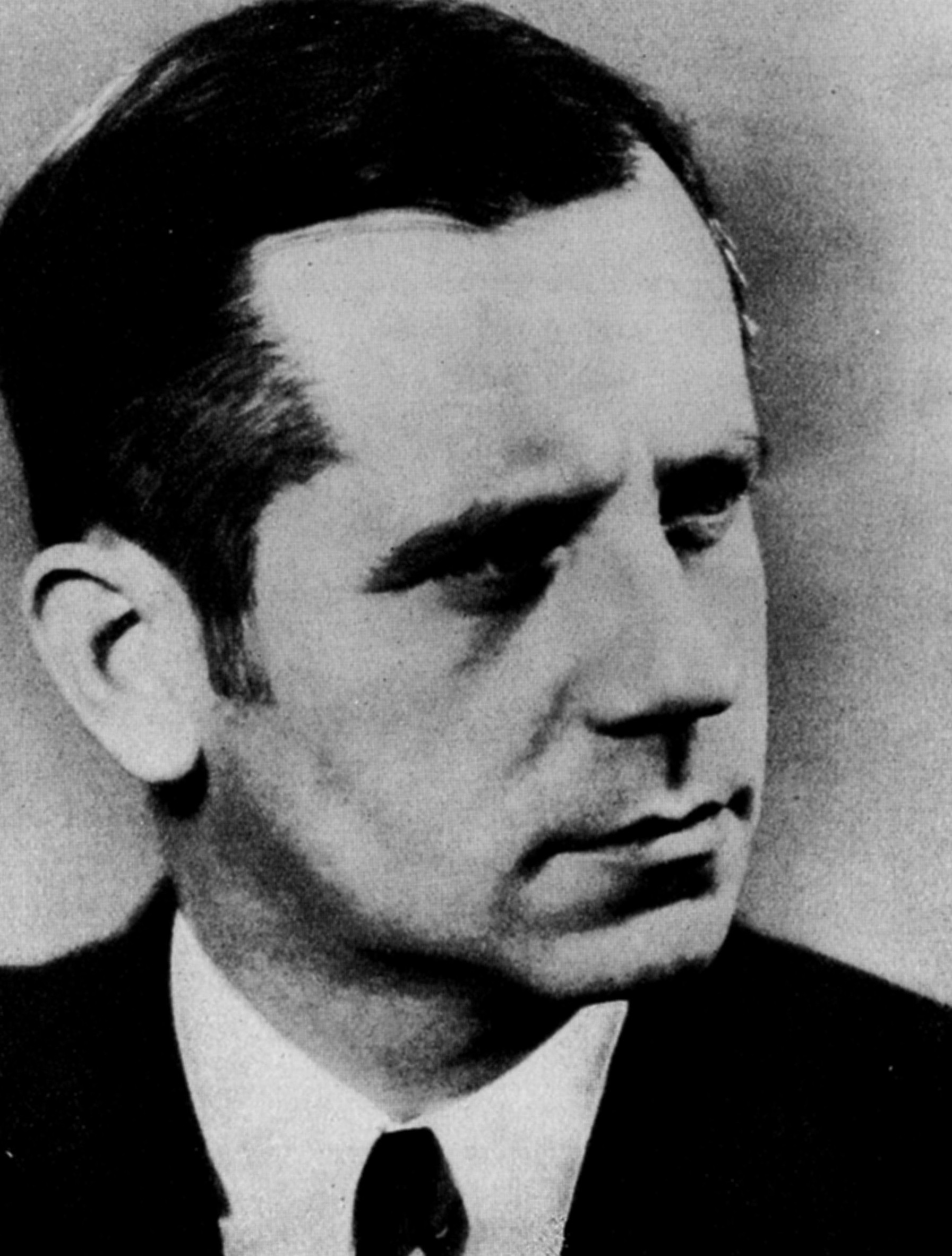
Fritz Nallinger

Fritz Nallinger (6 August 1898 in Esslingen am Neckar – 4 June 1984 in Stuttgart) was a German automobile engineer and executive.

He joined Benz & Cie. in 1922. Nallinger played an important part in the development of all-round independent suspension for passenger cars and in the introduction of (relatively) high speed diesel engines to passenger cars in the 1930s, something which has remained a key strength for the company ever since.

During the Nazi period, he enjoyed the status of Wehrwirtschaftsführer, reflecting the important war-time contribution from European auto-makers to military equipment production in the principal belligerent states. He was appointed a director on the research and development side of the business in 1940, and in 1941 was appointed to the executive board. At this time, he was also appointed a member of the "Deutschen Akademie der Luftfahrtforschung". (German Academy of aircraft research).

After the war, he continued to play a leading role in the Daimler Benz Research and Development department, associated in particular with the company's return to racing in 1954.

Fritz Nallinger retired from Daimler-Benz in December 1965. He was succeeded by Hans Scherenberg.
