= Mercedes-Benz OM 138 =

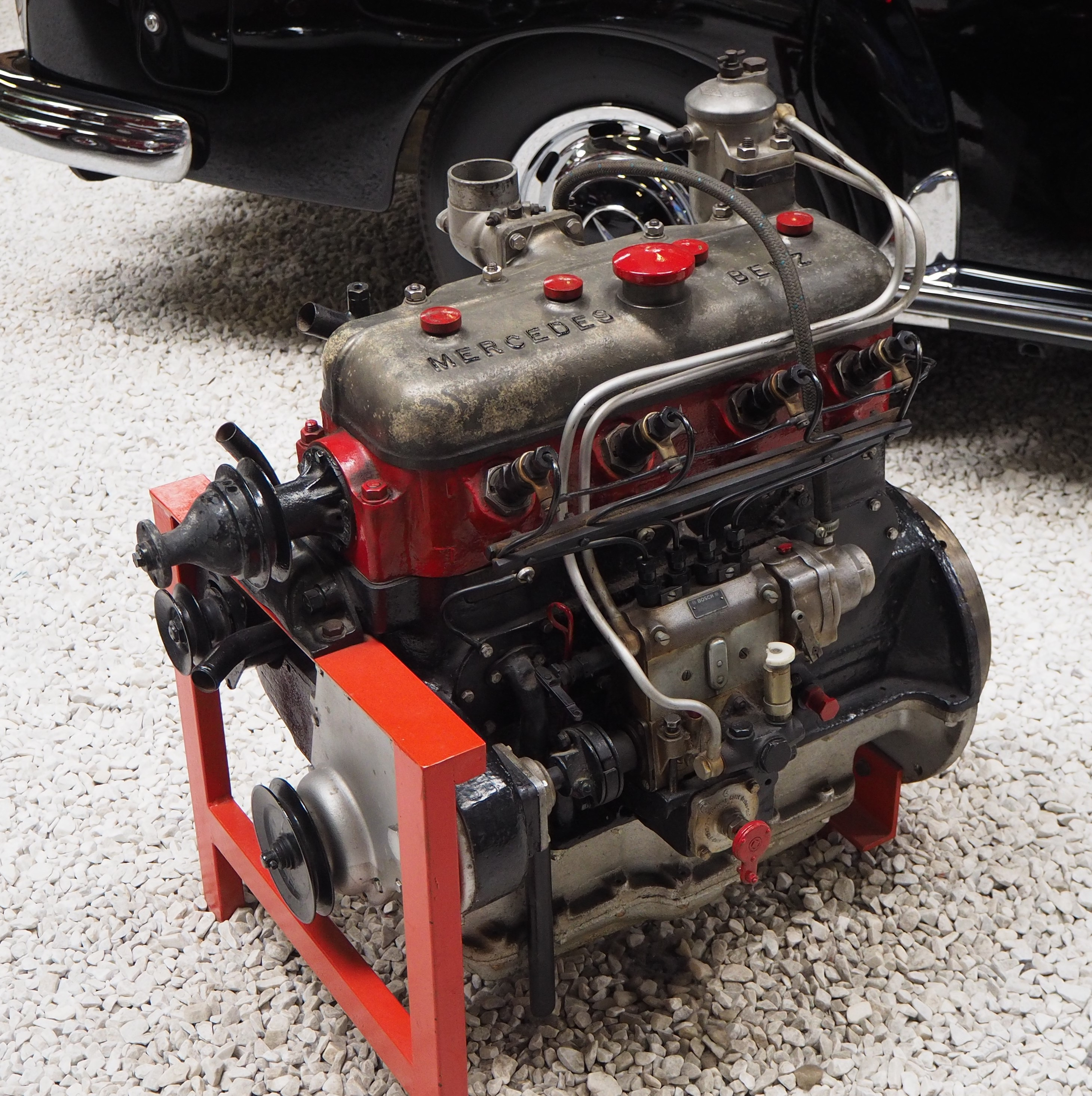

Overview
- Manufacturer: Daimler Benz AG
- Production: 1935–1940

Layout
- Configuration: Naturally aspirated Straight-4
- Displacement: 2.5 L; 155.3 cu in (2,545 cc)
- Cylinder bore: 90 mm (3.54 in)
- Piston stroke: 100 mm (3.94 in)
- Cylinder block material: Grey cast iron
- Valvetrain: OHV 2 valves per cylinder
- Compression ratio: 20.5:1

Combustion
- Operating principle: Diesel
- Fuel system: Precombustion chamber injection
- Fuel type: Diesel oil
- Oil system: Wet sump
- Cooling system: Water-cooled

Output
- Power output: 33 kW (45 PS)
- Torque output: car engines: 105.35 N⋅m (77.70 lb⋅ft) truck engines: 112.88 N⋅m (83.26 lb⋅ft)

Dimensions
- Dry weight: 300 kg (661 lb)

Chronology
- Predecessor: None
- Successor: OM 636

The Mercedes-Benz OM 138 is a diesel engine manufactured by Daimler-Benz. In total, 5,719 units were produced between 1935 and 1940. (Note: According to Oswald, 1,082 engines were made for the L 1100 and 2,670 were made for the L 1500. Daimler says that 1,967 diesel-powered W 138s were produced.) It was the first diesel engine especially developed and made for a passenger car. The first vehicle powered by the OM 138 was the Mercedes-Benz W 138. The light Mercedes-Benz trucks L 1100 and L 1500 as well as the bus O 1500 (Note: The O 1500 is a variant of the L 1500, however, it has its own model number.) were also offered with the OM 138 as an alternative to the standard Otto engine.

== Impact ==
Daimler-Benz started mass production of the six-cylinder inline truck diesel engine OM 5 in 1928. Technical improvements allowed an increase in rated rotational speed, thus allowing more power with lower displacement, which made it possible to use the diesel engine as a car engine. Diesel engines have significantly lower running costs than Otto engines; this was the motivation for the adaption of the diesel engine as a car engine. The W 138 powered by the OM 138 has a fuel consumption of 10 L/100 km (28 mpg_{‑imp}; 24 mpg_{‑US}), whereas its Otto-powered counterpart W 21 has a fuel consumption of 13 L/100 km (22 mpg_{‑imp}; 18 mpg_{‑US}). Caused by the lower diesel fuel price compared to petrol, the W 138 was favoured especially by taxi drivers.

Even though the OM 138 was designed as a car engine, 3,752 out of 5,719 engines produced were used in trucks. The OM 138 marked the beginning of Daimler-Benz car diesel engine production; however, until Volkswagen AG introduced its EA 827 in the Golf I in the 1970s, the diesel engine was uncommon as a passenger car engine in Germany.

== Development ==
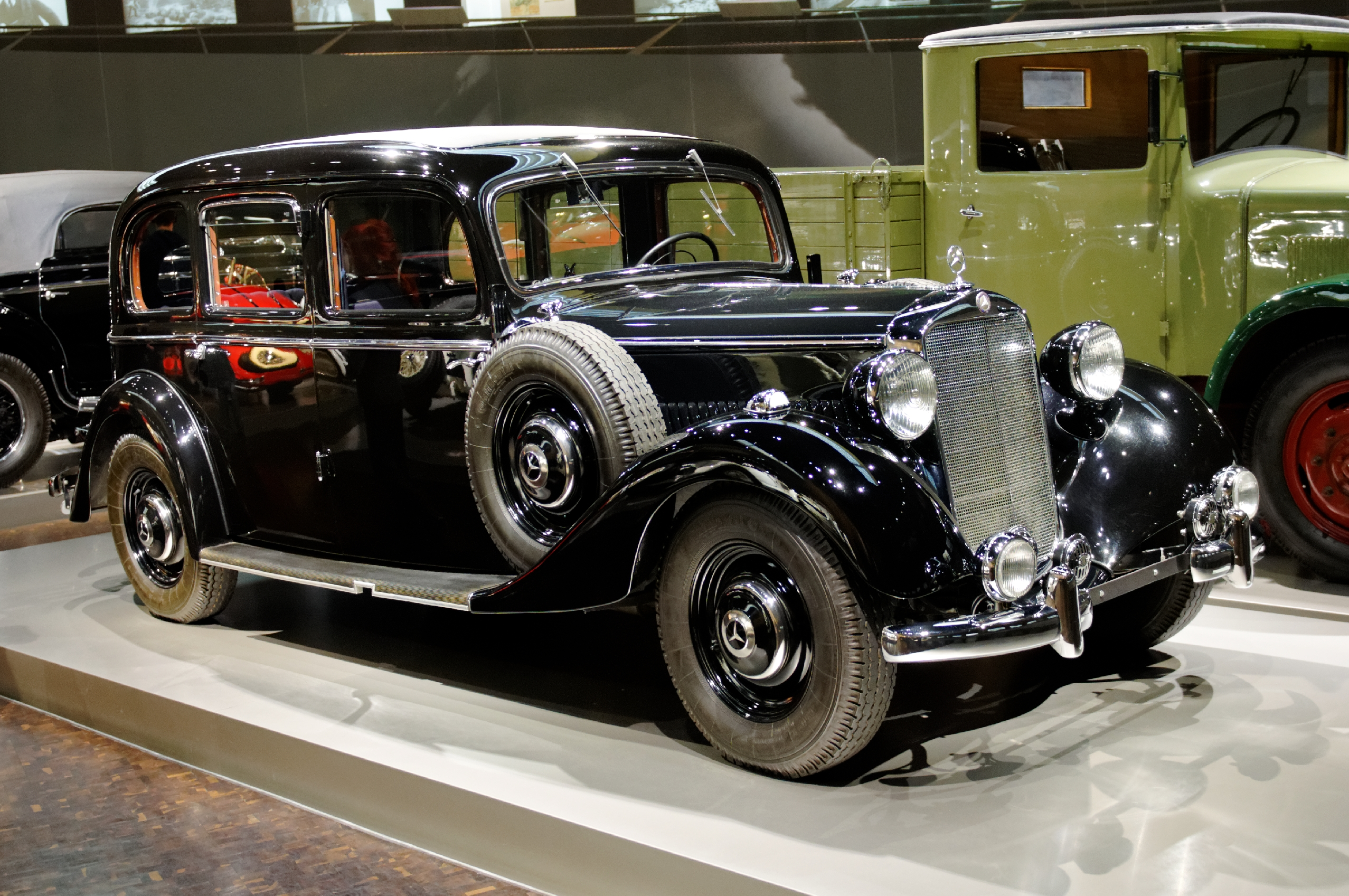
The W 138 was equipped with the OM 138.

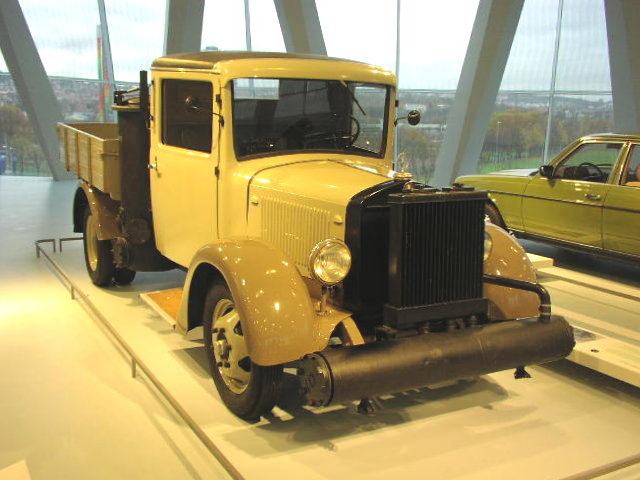
Also equipped with the OM 138: The light trucks L 1100 – L 1500. The truck shown in this photograph has a wood gas generator and accordingly an Otto engine.

The development of a passenger car diesel engine began in the autumn of 1933. Albert Heeß, designer of the Silberpfeil racecar, was the head of development. For the first tests, a straight-six-cylinder truck diesel engine with a displacement of 3.8 L was used. It produced 59 kW (80 PS). This engine, however, caused vibrations that were too strong for prototype car chassis, so Daimler-Benz tried to develop a less powerful and smaller diesel engine. Two prototype engines were developed from scratch: The OM 134, a water-cooled inline-three-cylinder engine with a rated power of 22 kW (30 PS), and the OM 141, an inline-four-cylinder engine producing 26 kW (35 PS). These engines did not fulfill the requirements. Daimler-Benz decided to use the truck engine again to develop a fitting powerplant for a car. In 1934, the cylinder count of the truck engine was reduced to four, and the bore and stroke dimensions were kept. Problems such as heavy exhaust emissions and rough engine running were solved, and mass production could begin in 1935.

== Technical description ==
The OM 138 is a naturally aspirated and water-cooled inline-four-cylinder diesel engine with precombustion chamber injection, wet sump lubrication and OHV valvetrain. Its displacement is 2.54 L (155 in^{3}) The bore and the stroke is 90 mm × 100 mm (3.54 in × 3.94 in), this gives the OM 138 a high rotational speed of 3000 rpm as a car engine and 2800 rpm as a truck engine. The rated power is 33 kW (45 PS; 44 hp).

=== Crankcase ===
The crankcase of the OM 138 consists of two parts, a lower part with the lower part of the crankshaft bearing and an upper part with the cylinder block and the camshaft. The lower and upper crankcase parts are connected with pin screws on the horizontal crankshaft centre. The lower crankcase part is strengthened with ribs and made of a light metal alloy. The flange of the gearbox is cast onto the lower crankcase part. The upper crankcase part is made of grey cast iron, it reaches from the crankshaft to the cylinder head. On its front, the upper crankcase part has a bulge that holds the camshaft, so that the camshaft can be driven by the crankshaft using only two gears. The camshaft is supported in five bearings. For camshaft maintenance, the bulge on the crankcase front has a removable cover. Mountings for the starter motor, the alternator and the injection pump are also cast onto the crankcase. For the lubrication of the crank- and camshaft, the crankcase has an oil pipe drilled into.

=== Pistons and power transmission ===
The pistons are made of light metal alloy and have three compression rings as well as one oil ring. They are connected to the crankshaft with I-shape connecting rods made of heat treatable steel. The bearings of the connecting rods are made of a lead bronze alloy and are fixed with a pin. Each connecting rod has a small oil pipe for the lubrication of its bearings. For weight reduction, the connecting rod pins are hollow-drilled. The crankshaft with hardened pins is supported in five bearings and is equipped with counterweights to reduce crankshaft bearing wear. The covers of the crankshaft bearings are mounted with two pin screws each. The flywheel is flanged onto the crankshaft. On the opposite side of the crankshaft, it holds a friction- and vibration damper.

=== Cylinder head ===
The OM 138 has one cylinder head for all four cylinders. The key element in the cylinder head are the precombustion chambers. They are located in a 45° angle above the combustion chamber and placed in a bulge in the cylinder head. Like other early OM diesel engines, the OM 138 has a sieve for fuel spraying purposes between the main combustion chamber and precombustion chamber. The injection nozzles inject fuel into the precombustion chambers, they are mounted on the cylinder head and can be maintained with ease. The glow plugs are mounted underneath the injection nozzles and are easily accessible as well. On its precombustion chamber side, the cylinder head also has the pushrods necessary for the OHV valve train. The intake and outlet are at the opposite side; the intake manifold is a part of the cylinder head and located at its top.

=== Valvetrain and fuel system ===
The camshaft in the crankcase has a flange to hold the camshaft gear. Between this flange and the camshaft gear, the camshaft has another gear that drives the injection pump. In the centre of the camshaft, a third gear drives the oil pump. The overhead valves have double valve springs; each cylinder has one inlet and one outlet valve of the same size. The valves are pushed by tappets, pushrods and rocker arms. The rocker arms, which are supported in bronze bearings, are lubricated by the wet sump lubrication system. They are secured with a horizontal screw each. The fuel is pumped to the injection nozzles by a Bosch size A injection pump, that is driven by the gear between the flange and camshaft gear on the camshaft. The injection pump has a Hele-Shaw clutch and a pneumatic governor.

=== Lubrication system and auxiliary devices ===
The oil pump is mounted in the centre of the engine in the oil sump and flanged onto the crankcase. It has a small oil pipe with a sieve and a funnel to pump the oil from the sump through the oil filter into the main lubrication oil pipe. The governing valve for setting the oil pressure is easily accessible. The water pump, which also holds the fan, is mounted on the cylinder head on the front of the engine. It is driven by a belt that also drives the governor.

== Technical data ==
	OM 138
Configuration	Inline four-cylinder
Engine type	Diesel
Fuel system	Precombustion chamber injection
Valvetrain	OHV: 1 × inlet, 1 × outlet valve
Bore × Stroke	90 mm × 100 mm (3.54 in × 3.94 in)
Displacement	2.5 L; 155.3 cu in (2,545 cc)
Rated rotational speed	Car engines: 3000 rpm Truck engines: 2800 rpm
Rated power	33 kW (45 PS)
BMEP	5.2 bar (75 psi)
Compression ratio	20.5:1
Oil	5 L (5.3 US qt; 4.4 imp qt)
Mass	300 kg (661 lb)
Power–displacement ratio	13 kW/L

== Bibliography ==
- H. Kremser: Der Aufbau schnellaufender Verbrennungskraftmaschinen für Kraftfahrzeuge und Triebwagen, Springer-Verlag, Wien 1942, ISBN 978-3-7091-5016-0, pp. 125–130.
- Werner Oswald: Mercedes-Benz Personenwagen 1886-1945. Band 1. Motorbuch Verlag, Stuttgart, 2001, ISBN 3-613-02167-6.
- Werner Oswald: Mercedes Benz - Lastwagen und Omnibusse 1896-1986. Motorbuch Verlag, Stuttgart 2008, ISBN 978-3-613-02943-9., pp. 139, 231.
- Olaf von Fersen: Ein Jahrhundert Automobiltechnik. Personenwagen. VDI-Verlag, Düsseldorf 1986, ISBN 3-18-400620-4., pp. 38, 282.
