= Mercedes-Benz W136 =

Mercedes 170 V
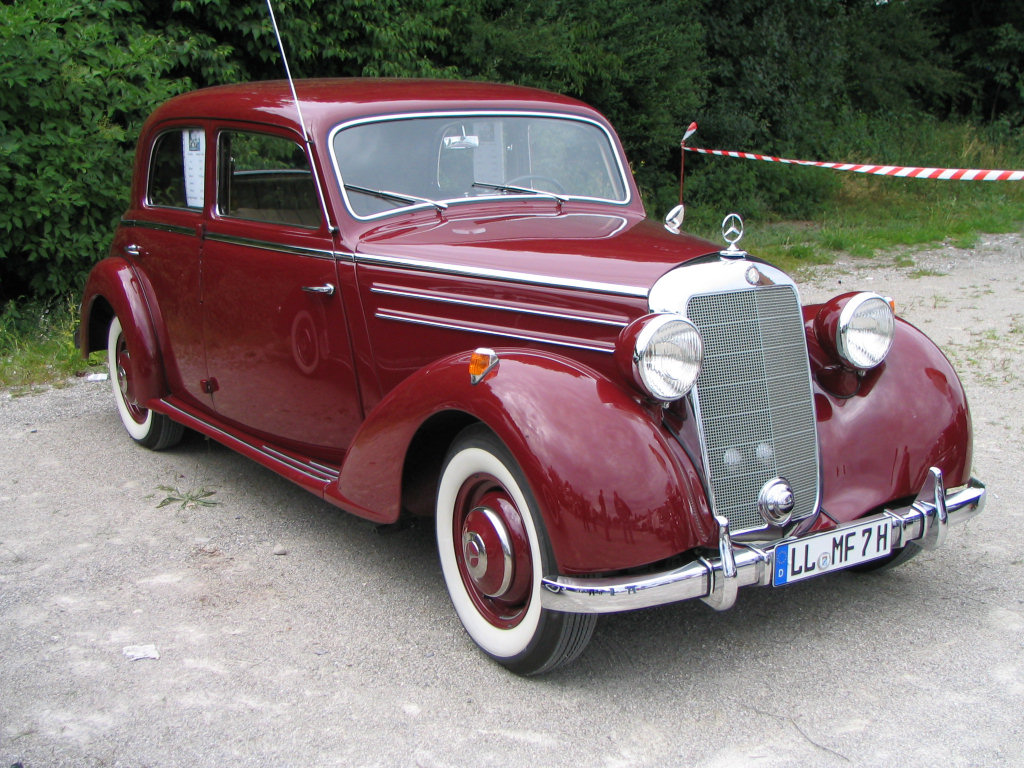
- 4-door Mercedes-Benz 170 V

Overview
- Manufacturer: Mercedes-Benz
- Production: 1935–1955; 1935–1942: 75,006 units 1947–1955: 83,190 units
- Assembly: Germany: Stuttgart; Argentina: Buenos Aires

Body and chassis
- Class: Mid-size luxury / Executive car (E)
- Body style: 4-door sedan 4-door Cabrio-Limousine; 2-door 2 & 4 seater cabriolets 2-door roadster 2-door pickup 4-door van
- Layout: FR layout

Powertrain
- Engine: petrol: 1697 cc M136 I4 (1935–1950); 1767 cc M136 I4 (1950–1953); diesel: 1697 cc OM636 I4 (1949–1950)

Dimensions
- Wheelbase: 2,845 mm (112.0 in)
- Length: 4,270 mm (168.1 in)
- Width: 1,570 mm (61.8 in) most pre-war body types 1,580 mm (62.2 in) most post-war body types 1,630 mm (64.2 in) from 1950

Chronology
- Predecessor: Mercedes-Benz W15
- Successor: Mercedes-Benz W120/W121; Mercedes-Benz W191

The Mercedes-Benz W136 was Mercedes-Benz's main line of inline-four cylinder motorcars from the mid-1930s into the 1950s. The model 170 V made its public debut as successor to the W15 Typ 170 in February 1936. Between 1936 and 1939 it was Mercedes' top selling model.

Between 1936 and 1942 over 75,000 were built making it by far the most popular Mercedes-Benz model up till that point.

Enough of the W136's tooling survived Allied bombing during World War II (or could be recreated post-war) for it to serve as the foundation upon which the company could rebuild. By 1947 the model 170 V had resumed its place as Mercedes' top-seller, a position it held until 1953.

The "V" in the 170 V's name was an abbreviation of "Vorn" (front), added to differentiate it from the contemporary rear-engined Mercedes-Benz 170H (W28) ("H" for "Heck", rear) which used the same four cylinder 1697cc engine, but positioned at the back of the car.

== Engine ==
The 1.7 litre four cylinder rear wheel-drive Mercedes-Benz 170 V (W136) was introduced in 1936 to replace the 1.7 litre six-cylinder Mercedes-Benz 170 (W15). Despite their similar engine capacities, the new car's side-valve M136 was more powerful. The manual transmission was four speed synchromesh (having been upgraded from synchromesh in only the top two ratios in 1940). Claimed maximum power was 38 PS (28 kW; 37 hp) at 3,400 RPM at an initial compression ratio of 6:1. Mileage was 10 litres per 100 kilometres (28 mpg_{‑imp}; 24 mpg_{‑US}). The engine was attached using just two mountings and set the standard for smoothness for four-cylinder motors.

== Bodywork options ==
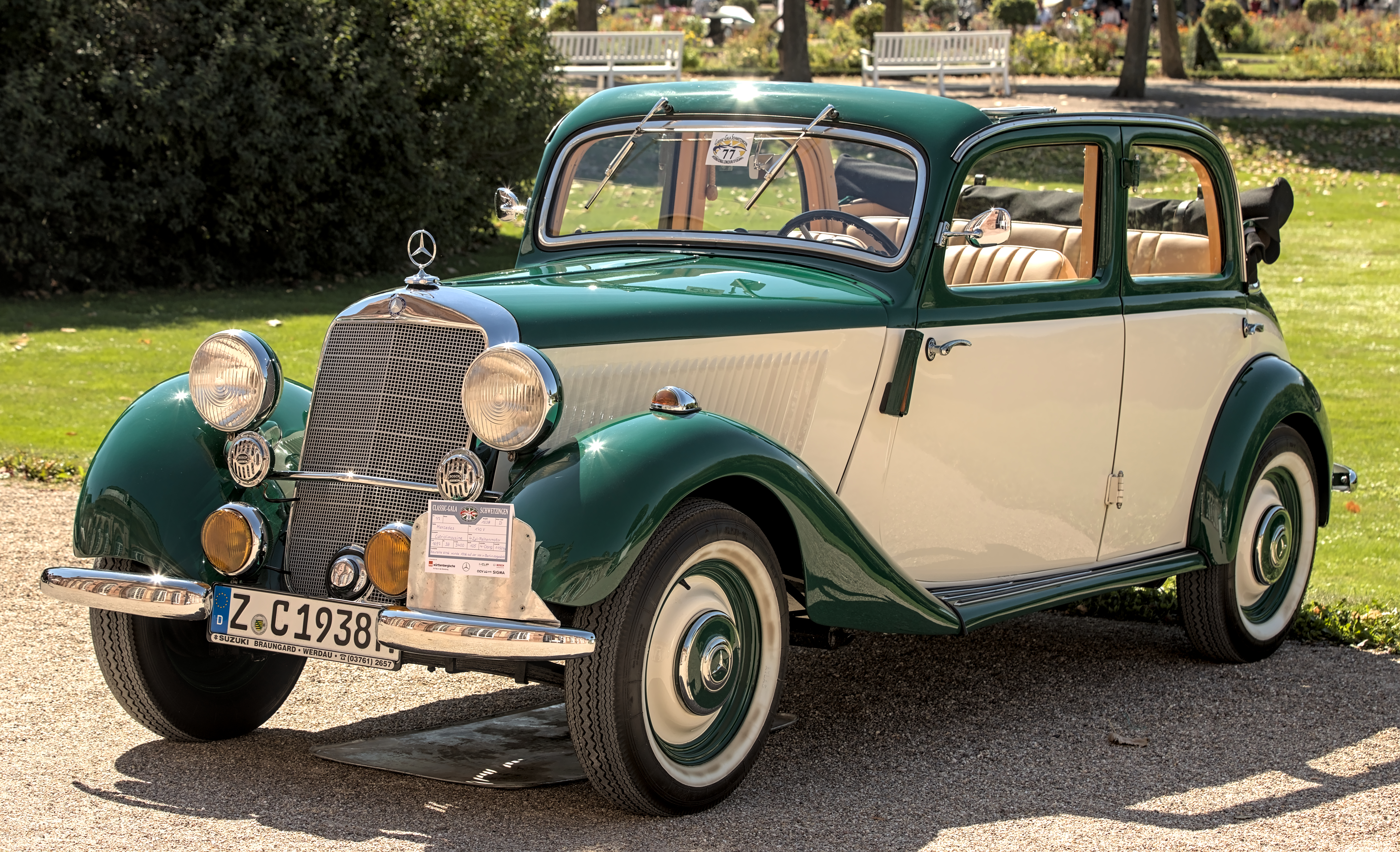
Mercedes-Benz 170 V Cabrio-Limousine

Most of the cars produced, and an even higher proportion of those that survive, were two- or four-door "Limousine" (saloon/sedan) bodied cars, but the range of different body types offered in the 1930s for the 170 V was unusually broad. A four-door "Cabrio-Limousine" combined the four doors of the four-door "Limousine" with a full-length foldaway canvas roof.

Both the four door bodies were also available adapted for taxi work, with large luggage racks at the back. There was a two-door two-seater "Cabriolet A" and a two-door four-seater "Cabriolet B" both with luggage storage behind the seats and beneath the storage location of the hood when folded (but without any external lid for accessing the luggage from outside the car). A common feature of the 170 V bodies was external storage of the spare wheel on the car's rear panel. The two-seater roadster featured a large flap behind the two seats with a thinly upholstered rear partition, and which could be used either as substantial luggage platform or as an additional - uncomfortable - bench, the mother-in-law seat.

In addition to the wide range of passenger car bodied 170 Vs, a small commercial variant was offered, either as a flatbed truck or with a box body on the back. Special versions of the 170 V were offered, adapted for use as ambulances or by the police, mountain rescue services and military.

== 1935–1942 ==
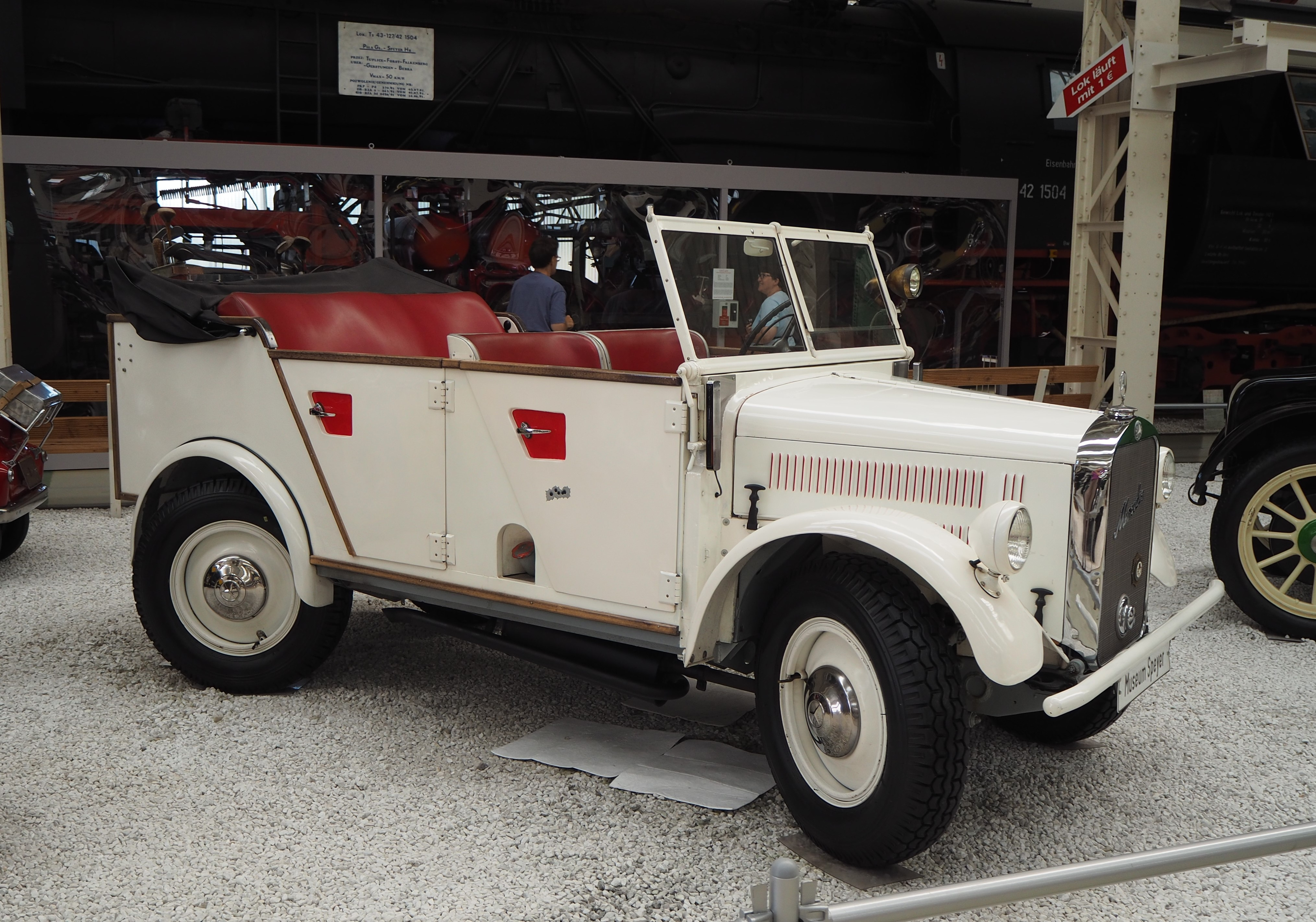
The 170V based type G5 (W152) with four-wheel drive and steering.

The first two years' production had the Mercedes star mounted directly on the grille, the radiator cap was mounted beneath the bonnet. In 1937 the grille was changed and the star now sat atop the radiator cap. The pre-war production of W136 cars and light commercials was around 90,000; production ended in 1942 as all efforts were directed towards the war. Already in 1939 a wood gas-powered model called the 170 VG was presented as the result of petrol becoming largely unavailable for civilian purposes. The generator was mounted on the rear, meaning that the spare wheel had to be relocated to the roof. Thus equipped, the engine produced only 22 PS (16 kW) at 3200 rpm, enough for a top speed of 80 km/h (50 mph). Mercedes-Benz also made the gas generator available as a kit for installation on existing automobiles.

As well as cars for private use, Mercedes-Benz also developed a few special models. There was the 1935 170 VG, an all-wheel-drive staff vehicle (Kübelwagen) with the internal model code W133 III. 62 were ordered for tests but it lost out to Stoewer's competing design for a light Einheits-PKW and none more were made. In 1936 here was also the four-wheel-steered (and four-wheel-drive) 170 VL (W139) on a shortened chassis. Again, the Wehrmacht opted out and only 42 were built. In 1937 Mercedes-Benz tried a third time and developed the G5 (W152). Developed from the 170 VL and fitted with the larger engine also used in the 200 V (see below) this was also not picked up by the German armed forces. Mercedes-Benz presented it at the 1938 British International Motor Show instead, offering it with no doors, with half doors, or with full doors. 378 examples were built from 1938 until 1941; nearly all were exported.

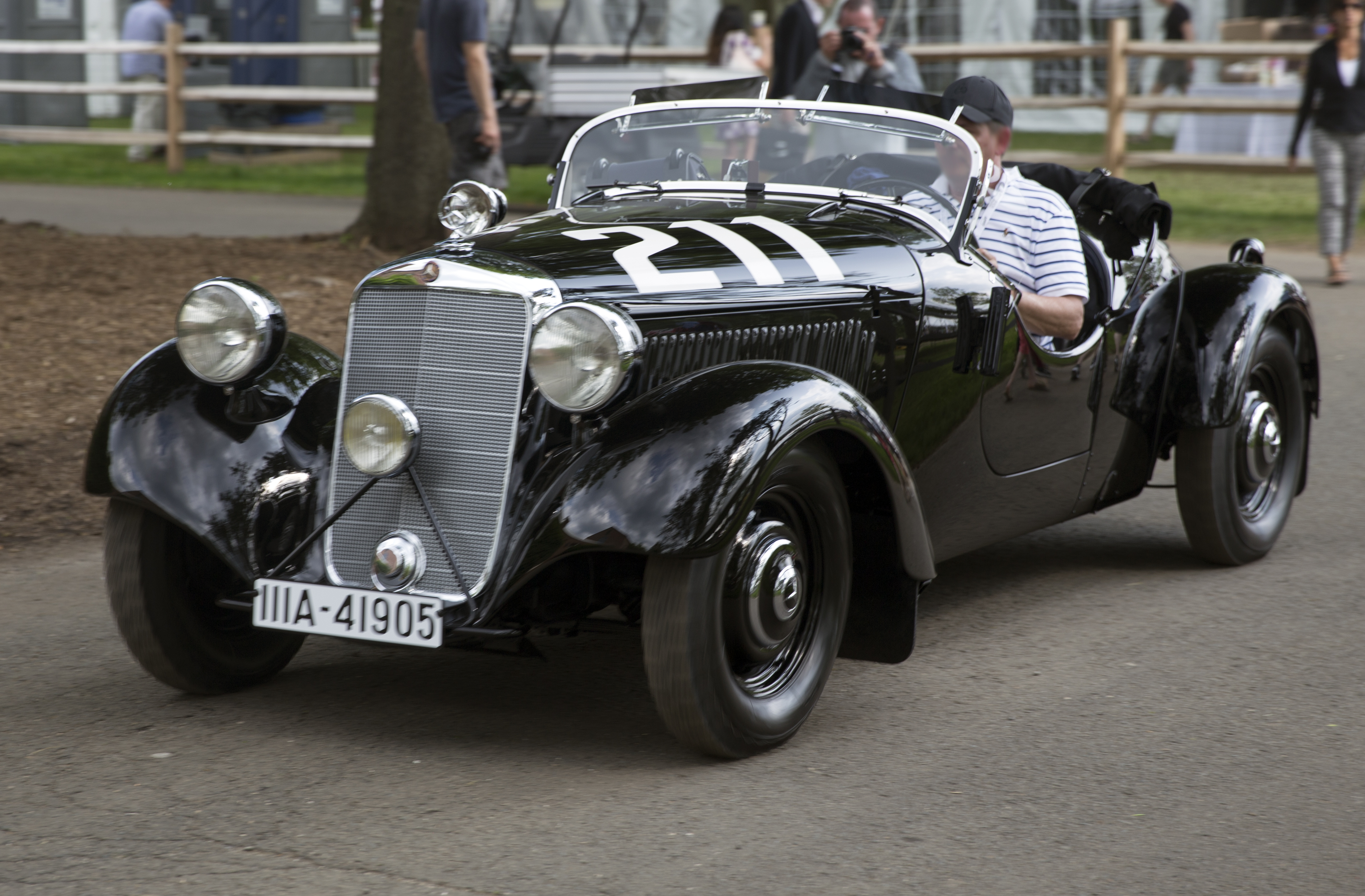
1938 Mercedes-Benz 170 VS

In the 1930s, various reliability trials / rallies were made popular by the Nazi regime, to stimulate development of light cross-country vehicles. To compete in these, Mercedes-Benz developed a lightweight, two-seat roadster with magnesium and aluminium bodywork details. Weighing in at 260 kg (570 lb) less than the regular model, the 170 VR appeared in 1936 and was also used the next year. The 170 VR had a standard engine and rear-wheel drive-train, but did benefit from stronger suspension, larger wheels, and different gearing.

Subsequent to the Austrian annexation, the 1938 edition of the prestigious Austrian Alpine Rally was called the Deutsche Alpenfahrt ("German Alpine Rally"). Mercedes-Benz felt obliged to update their entry and produced the 170 VS (sometimes called "SV"). This received a 1912 cc engine with single or twin carburettors and 50 or 60 PS (37 or 44 kW) at 3600 rpm according to fitment. In 1940 the 2007 cc 200 V (model code W149). This had a 2007 cc engine producing either 53 or 64 PS (39 or 47 kW).

=== 170 VK Kübelwagen ===
From 1938 to 1942, Mercedes-Benz built over 19,000 units of the 170 V with a "Kübelwagen"-type body (simple open-topped body for military use) for the Wehrmacht, as the 170 VK, making this the second-most produced German light open military vehicle of World War II.

== 1946–1955 ==
During the war the Mercedes-Benz plant suffered very severe bomb damage, but the manufacturer nevertheless emerged from the trauma of war with a significant competitive advantage over many of its pre-war competitors. Manufacturers including Adler, BMW and Ford in Germany had been heavily dependent for the supply of steel car bodies on Ambi-Budd whose Berlin plant was destroyed by bombing in 1943: its site now ended up in the Soviet occupation zone (subsequently East Germany). The manufacturing plants of Horch, Wanderer and BMW were located in what in July 1945 became the Soviet controlled part of Germany. None of these manufacturers could resume volume production without first finding a way to obtain and fund a source of steel car bodies and access to a suitable plant for auto-assembly. Mercedes-Benz, however, retained ownership of and access to its car plant.

Production restarted in May 1946. The vehicles produced were versions of the 170 V, but in 1946 only 214 vehicles were produced and they were all light trucks or ambulances. Passenger car production resumed in July 1947, but volumes were still very low, with just 1,045 170 Vs produced that year. There was no return for the various open topped models from the 1930s. Customers for a Mercedes-Benz 170 V passenger car were restricted to the four-door Limousine (saloon) bodied car.

Production did ramp up during the next couple of years, and in 1949 170 V production returned to above 10,000 cars. From May 1949 the car, badged in this permutation as the Mercedes-Benz 170D, was offered with the exceptionally economical OM636 diesel engine producing 38 PS (28 kW; 37 hp) at 3,200 rpm. The 170D was the world's third diesel fueled passenger car, and the first to be introduced after the war.

=== 170 S ===
Lacking a luxury car in its line-up, Mercedes sought to regain a niche in that market by introducing the upscale 170 S (W191) version of the 170 V in 1949. It was more luxurious, costlier and, when launched, slightly larger than the 170 V, distinctions the company made an effort to emphasize. Though sometimes referred to today as the first S-Class Mercedes-Benz that designation did not yet exist.

A pair of 170 S derivations followed, the 170 Sb and 170 DS diesel models, earning the 170 S series its own chassis code, W191. The 170 S series retained the separate internal designation until the 1953 introduction of Mercedes' new W120 180 "Ponton", when the 170 S was downsized to the 170 V's body (while retaining the 170 S' more powerful motor). This hybrid was given the designation 170 S-V, and repositioned below the 180 in the company line-up. Production of the 170 S-V ended in 1955.

The Mercedes-Benz 170 SV and 170 SD were also built briefly in Argentina from 1952 to 1955 in sedan, taxi, pick-up, and van versions.

=== Police "special" ===
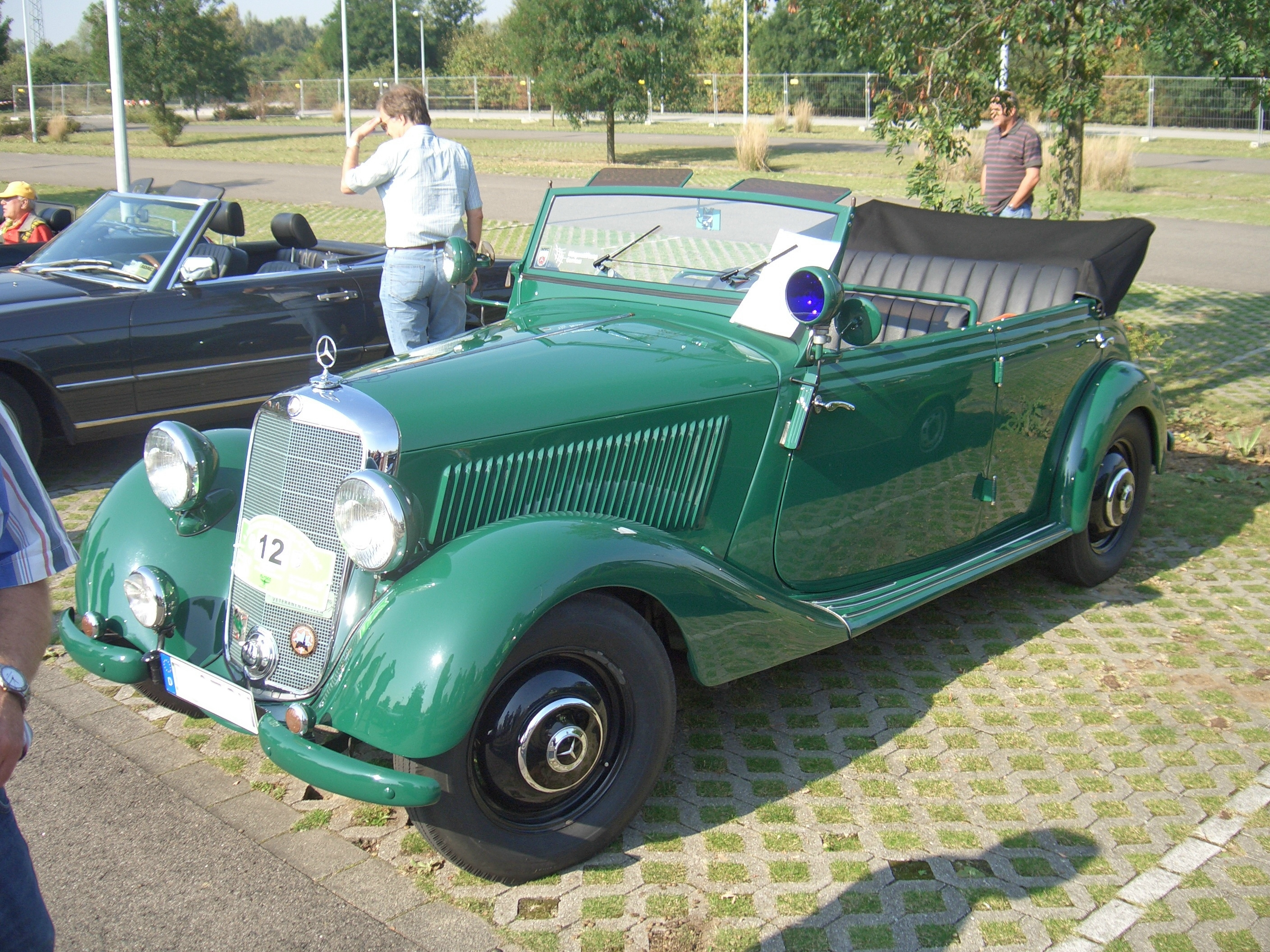
Mercedes-Benz 170D OTP "Police special" (1951–1952)

In 1951 and 1952 Mercedes-Benz produced a 170 D OTP version for police use. This was effectively a four-door cabriolet, although the hood was of rather a thin material and basic structure when compared to the 170 cabriolets of the 1930. It was a requirement that all the cars should be painted in "Police Green", but in the end most of the cars delivered to the police were painted blue. Although the car was provided only for the use of official bodies, it incorporated several technical and other features, including for the first time on a 170 car a boot accessible from the outside via a hinged lid, which soon afterwards appeared on other upgraded W136s. A single one known to have been painstakingly fully restored in the United States is the closest to factory original in existence today. A fully restored OTP sold to a private collector fetched north of 350,000 Euro, in 2015.

=== 1950 upgrade ===
In May 1950 the 170 V and 170 D received a power upgrade with a larger 1.8 litre version of the M136 engine (which would go on to power the new Mercedes-Benz 180 in 1950). At this stage there was no name change to reflect the increased engine size. At the same time safety was improved with the incorporation of telescopic shock absorbers, a wider rear track, and stronger brakes. Attention in this upgrade was also applied to comfort with the passenger cabin widened by 50 mm (2.0 in) and larger seats. The luggage compartment at the back finally became accessible from outside, using a boot/trunk lid and ventilation was improved. To differentiate them from the existing models, the petrol/gasoline and diesel versions of the upgraded cars were designated internally as the Mercedes-Benz 170 Va and Mercedes-Benz 170 Da.

=== 1952 upgrade ===
A further upgrade took place in May 1952, accompanied by new suffixes for the name. The Mercedes-Benz 170 Vb and Mercedes-Benz 170 Db now featured new single piece bumpers. The rear track was widened by a further 18 mm (0.71 in). The two rows of vertical ventilation slats that had until now adorned the sides of the bonnet/hood were replaced by a pair of horizontal slats on each side. The windscreen wipers which had hitherto been attached at the top of the windscreen frame were now attached at the bottom, the screen itself also having been slightly, if imperceptibly, enlarged.

The 170 Vb and 170 Db remained in production for just over a year, until August 1953,

=== 1953 upgrade ===
With the appearance of the new Ponton-bodied Mercedes-Benz 180 in 1953, the 170 models suddenly appeared very old fashioned. The 170 V was delisted in September 1953: in July 1953 the manufacturer had replaced the existing 170 S with the reduced specification 170 S-V. The car that resulted combined the slightly larger body from the 170 S with the less powerful 45 PS engine that had previously powered the 170 V. The vehicle provided reduced performance but at a reduced price, while salesmen steered more prosperous buyers to the new Ponton bodied 180. The diesel powered 170 S continued to be sold, now branded as the 170 S-D. The internal “W191” designation which had distinguished the previous 170 Ss was removed, and the 170 Ss manufactured from 1953 returned to the “W136” works designation that they had shared with the 170 V till the end of 1951.

In September 1955 the last Mercedes-Benz W136, the Mercedes-Benz 170 S was withdrawn from production.

== Model numbers ==
W136

- 1935–1942: 170 V sedan/cabriolet
- 1946–1950: 170 V sedan/cabriolet
- 1949–1952: 170 S/SAC/SBC
- 1950–1952: 170 Va
- 1952–1953: 170 Vb
- 1949–1952: 170 S
- 1949–1950: 170 D
- 1950–1952: 170 Da/DaOTP
- 1952–1953: 170 Db
- 1953–1955: 170 S-V
- 1953–1955: 170 S-D

== Gallery ==
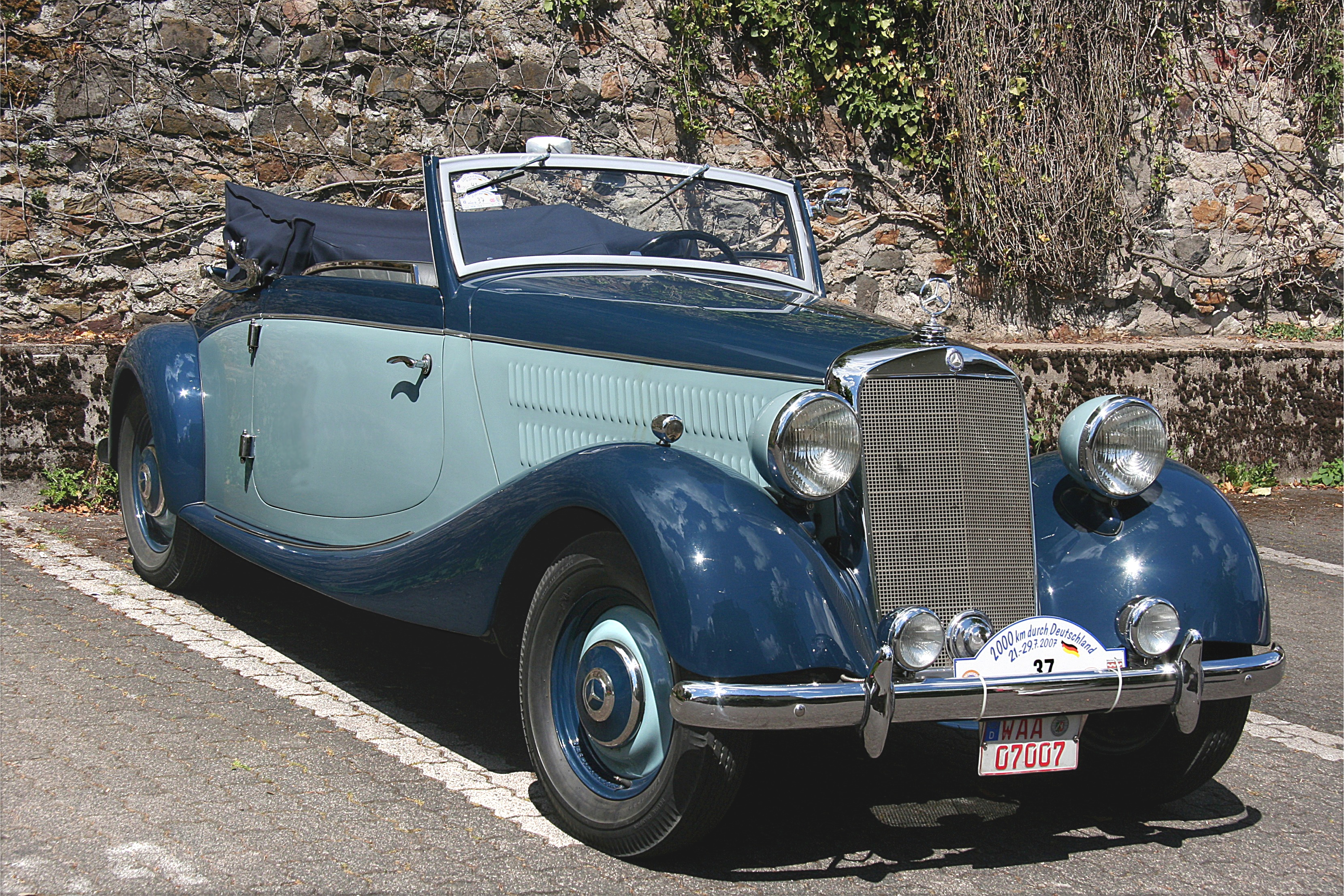
170 V Cabriolet A from 1938

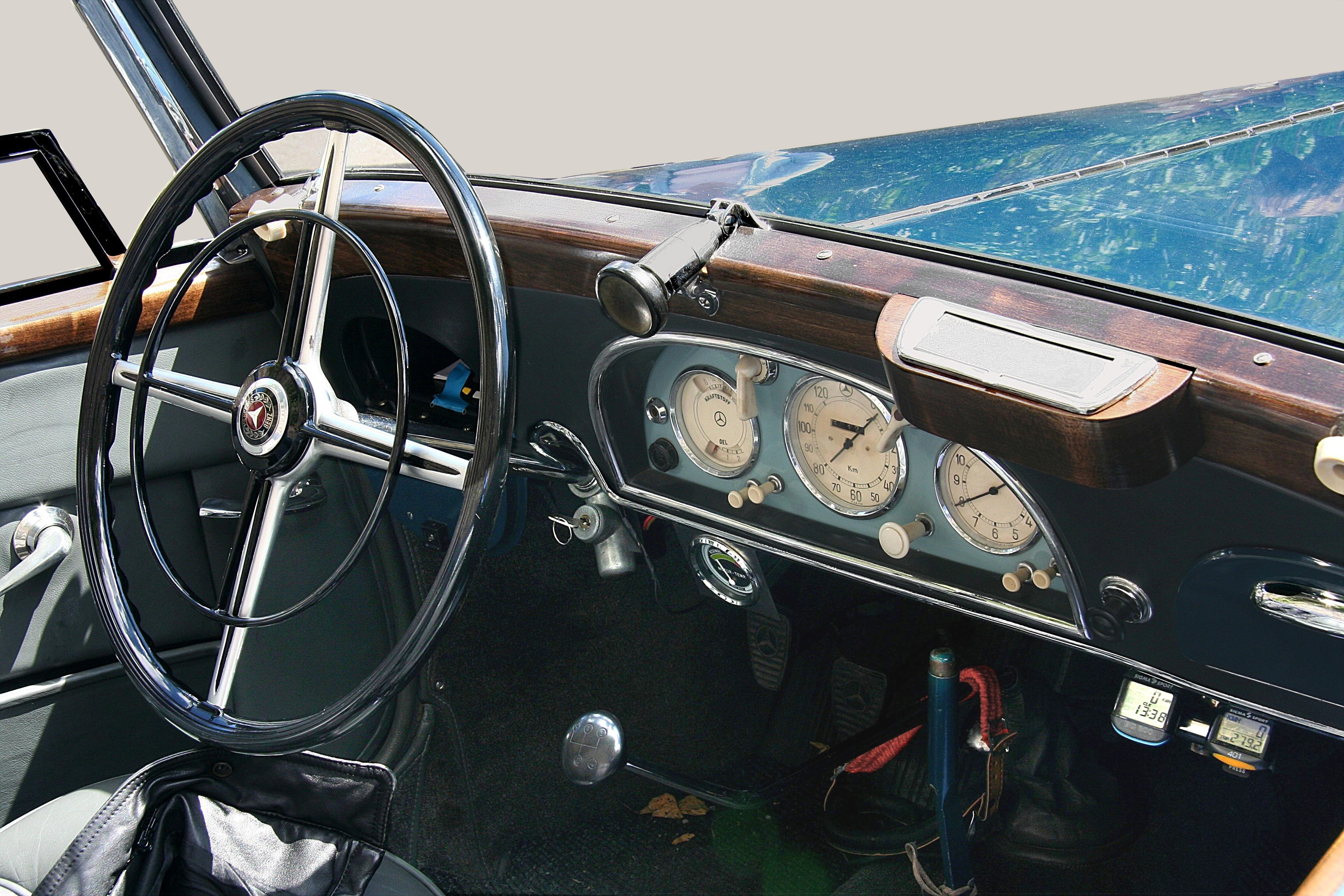
170 V Cabriolet A from 1938 (dashboard)

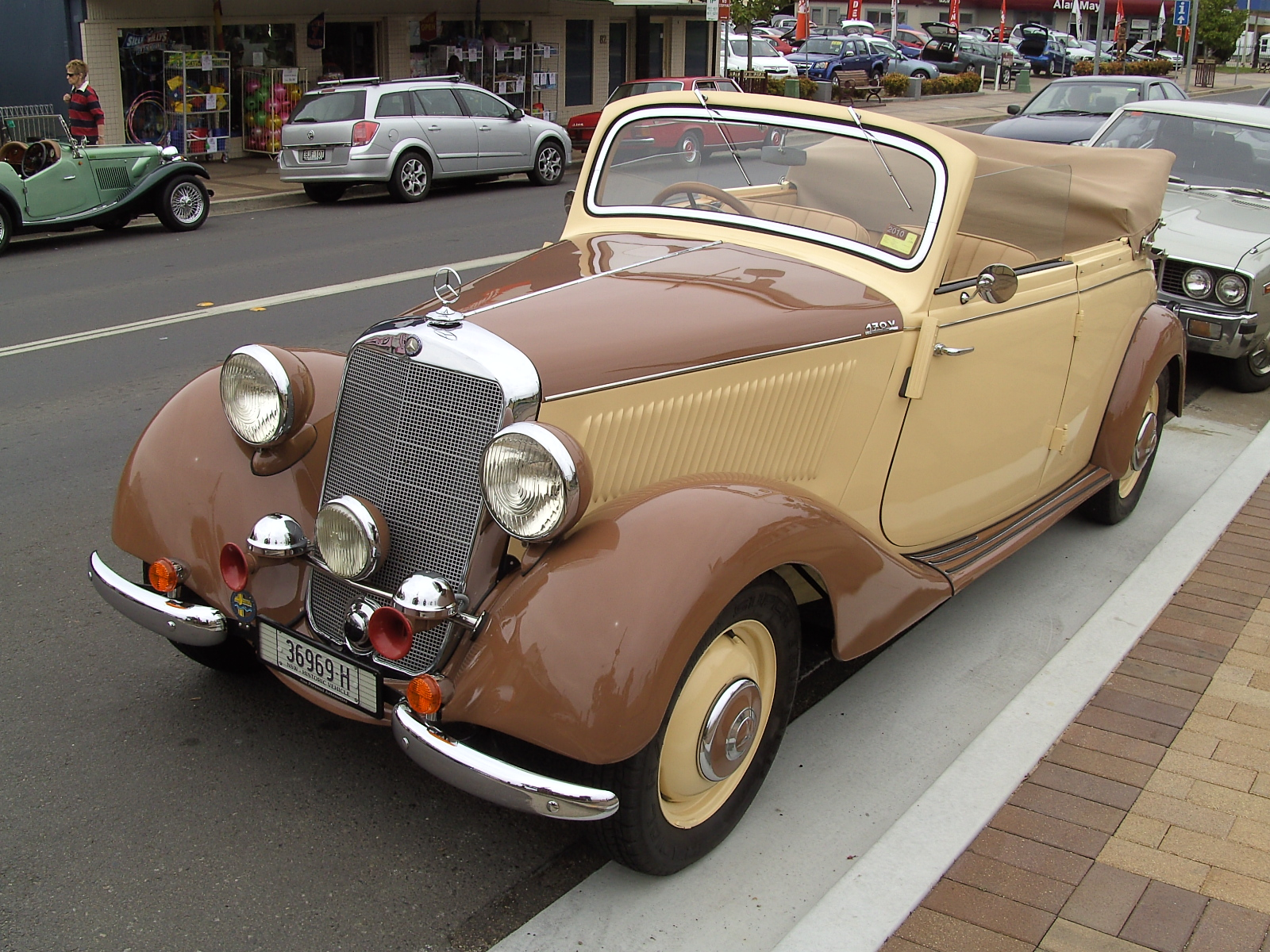
170 V Cabriolet, right-hand drive

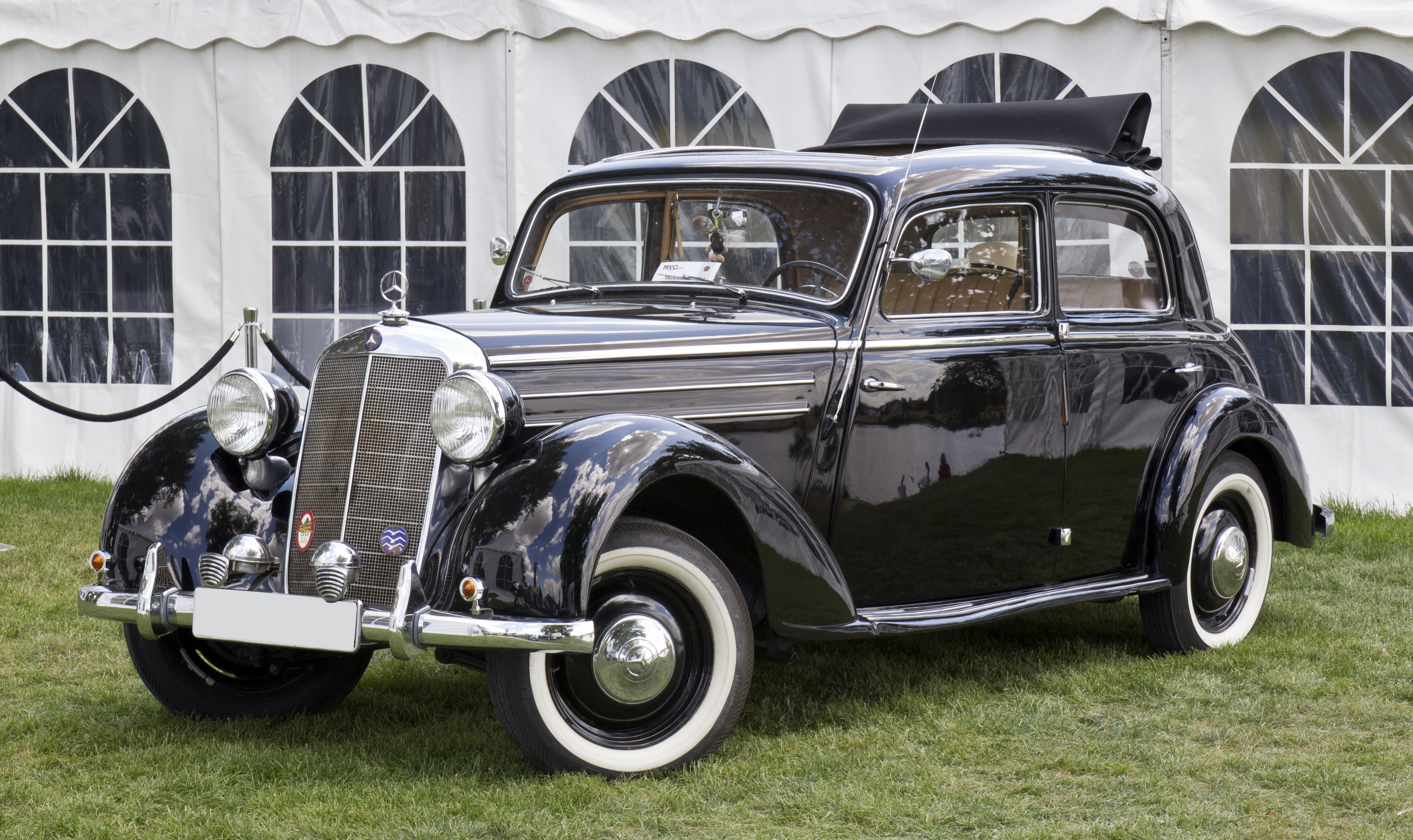
Mercedes-Benz 170 DS

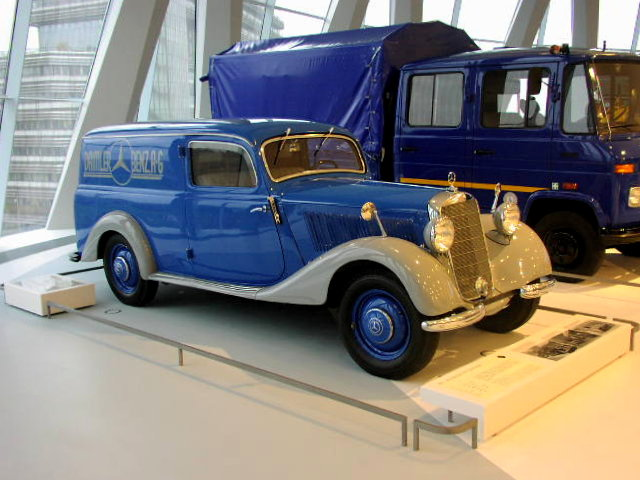
1952 Sedan Delivery/Panel van

== Timeline ==
1935	1936	1937	1938	1939	1940	1941	1942	1943	1944	1945	1946	1947	1948	1949	1950	1951	1952	1953	1954	1955
170 V								WWII			170 V				170 Va		170 Vb
			170 VS / 200 V					WWII						170 S/SAC/SBC				170 S-V/S-D
								WWII						170 D		170 Da		Db
								WWII									170 Sb
								WWII									170 DS
