= List of Mercedes-Benz vehicles =

Mercedes-Benz is a German automotive brand that was formed with the merger of Benz & Cie., the world's oldest car company, and Daimler Motoren Gesellschaft in 1926. It is part of the Mercedes-Benz Group AG, a German car manufacturing company. introduction.

== Current models ==
=== Passenger cars ===
Model	Calendar year introduced	Current model		Vehicle description
Model	Calendar year introduced	Introduction	Update/facelift	Vehicle description
Hatchbacks
A-Class	1997	2018	2022	C-segment/subcompact executive hatchback.
Sedans
A-Class	2018	2018	2022	C-segment/subcompact executive sedan.
CLA	2013	2025	–	C-segment/subcompact executive fastback sedan. Battery electric version available.
C-Class	1993	2021	2026	D-segment/compact executive sedan.
C-Class Electric	2026	2026	–	All-electric D-segment/compact executive sedan.
E-Class	1953	2023	–	E-segment/mid-size executive sedan.
EQE	2022	2022	–	All-electric E-segment fastback
AMG GT 4-Door Coupé	2018	2026	–	All-electric E-segment/mid-size executive 5-door liftback sedan.
S-Class	1954	2020	2026	F-segment/full-size luxury sedan.
EQS	2021	2021	2026	All-electric full-size luxury liftback.
Wagons/Estates
CLA	2013	2025	–	C-segment subcompact executive station wagon. Battery electric version available.
C-Class	1993	2021	2026	D-segment/compact executive station wagon.
E-Class	1965	2023	–	E-segment/mid-size executive station wagon.
Crossovers/SUVs
GLA	2013	2026	–	C-segment/subcompact luxury crossover SUV. Battery electric version available.
GLB	2019	2026	–	C-segment compact luxury crossover SUV. Battery electric version available.
GLC	2015	2022	–	Compact luxury crossover SUV.
GLC	2015	2022	–	Compact luxury crossover coupe SUV.
GLC Electric	2025	2025	–	All-electric compact luxury crossover SUV.
G-Class	1979	2024	–	Mid-size and luxury body-on-frame SUV. Commonly known as the G-Wagen. Battery electric version available.
GLE	1997	2019	2026	Mid-size luxury crossover SUV. Formerly the M-Class until 2015.
GLE	2016	2019	2026	Mid-size luxury crossover coupe SUV.
EQE SUV	2022	2022	–	All-electric mid-size luxury crossover SUV.
AMG GT SUV	2026	2026	–	All-electric mid-size luxury crossover SUV. SUV variant of the AMG GT 4-door Coupé.
GLS	2006	2020	2026	Full-size luxury SUV. Formerly the GL-Class until 2015.
EQS SUV	2022	2022	–	All-electric full-size luxury crossover SUV.
Roadsters/Sports cars
CLE	2023	2023	–	S-segment/Grand tourer coupe.
AMG GT	2014	2023	–	Front mid-engine, four-seater grand tourer coupe.
AMG SL	1954	2022	–	Front-engine, four-seater grand tourer roadster.
Minivans/MPVs
V-Class/Viano	1996	2014	2023	Full-size MPV. Passenger version of the Vito.
EQV	2020	2020	2023	All-electric version of the Vito.
VLE	2026	2026	–	All-electric MPV, successor of the EQV.
VLS	Upcoming	Upcoming	–	All-electric luxury MPV.
Mercedes-Maybach
S-Class	2015	2020	2026	F-segment/Ultra-luxury car.
GLS	2019	2019	2023	F-segment/Ultra-luxury SUV.
EQS SUV	2023	2023	–	Battery electric F-segment/ultra-luxury SUV.
SL	2024	2024	–	F-segment/grand tourer roadster.

=== Commercial vehicles ===
Model	Calendar year introduced	Current model		Vehicle description
Model	Calendar year introduced	Introduction	Update/facelift	Vehicle description
Vans
Vito	1996	2014	2023	Light commercial vehicle (Vito) and minivan (V-Class/Viano).
Sprinter	1995	2019	–	Light commercial vehicle and large van. Also marketed by Freightliner Trucks as the Freightliner Sprinter from 2001 to 2021 and by Dodge as the Dodge Sprinter from 2003 to 2009.
Commercial trucks
Atego	1998	2013	–	Rigid truck.
Unimog	1948	2013	–	All-wheel-drive medium-duty trucks.
Zetros	2008	2008	–	Off-road truck.
Econic	1998	1998	–	Low-entry truck.
Actros	1996	2011	2019	Heavy-duty truck.
Arocs	2013	2013	–	Heavy-duty truck.
Buses and coaches
Sprinter	1995	2019	–	Passenger minibus version of the Sprinter.
Conecto	1998	2016	2019	Single-deck integral bus.
Intouro	1999	2014	2020	Single-deck integral bus.
Citaro	1997	2011	–	Single-deck integral bus.
Capacity	2007	2014	–	Single-deck integral bus.
Tourismo	1994	2017	–	Single-deck integral coach.
Tourrider	2021	2021	–	Single-deck integral coach. Marketed in North America.
Travego	1999	2017	–	Single-deck integral coach. Marketed only on Turkey

== Cars produced ==
=== 1920s ===
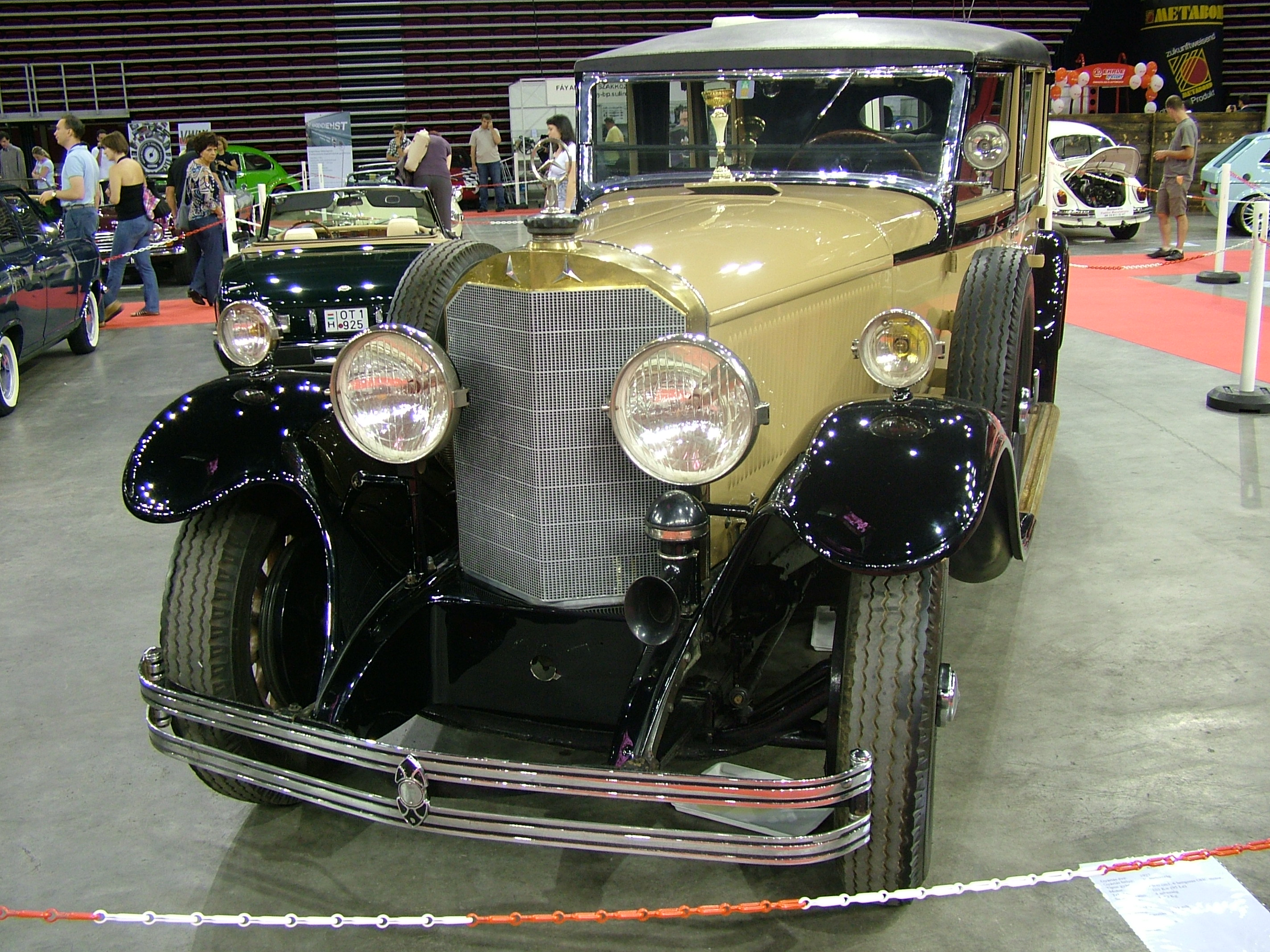
Mercedes-Benz 630K

- 400 (1924–1929)
- 630 (1926–1929)
- W02 8/38 PS, Stuttgart 200 (1926-1933)
- W03 12/55 PS, 300 (1926-1927)
- W04 300 (1927-1928)
- W06 S-Series, roadster (1927–1932)
  - SSK
- W05 350 (1928)
- 680S (1928)
- W08 Nürburg 460/500, large luxury car (1928-1939)
- W05 350 (1929-1930)
- W10 Mannheim 350/370/380, grand tourer (1929–1934)
- W11 10/50 PS, Stuttgart 200/260 (1929-1934)
- W37 L 1000 Express, light van based on the W11 (1929-1932)

=== 1930s ===
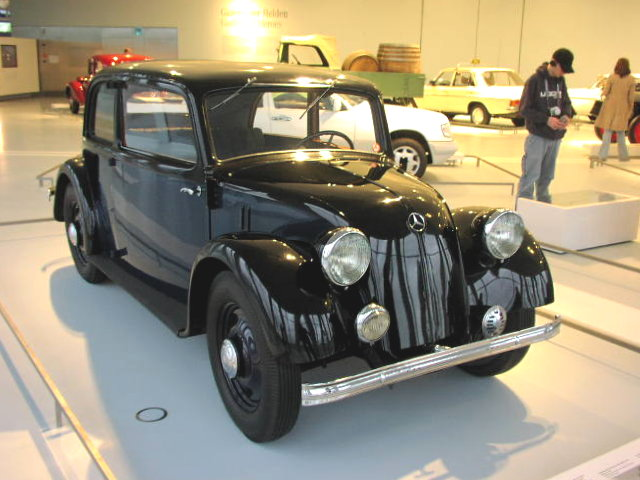
Mercedes-Benz W23

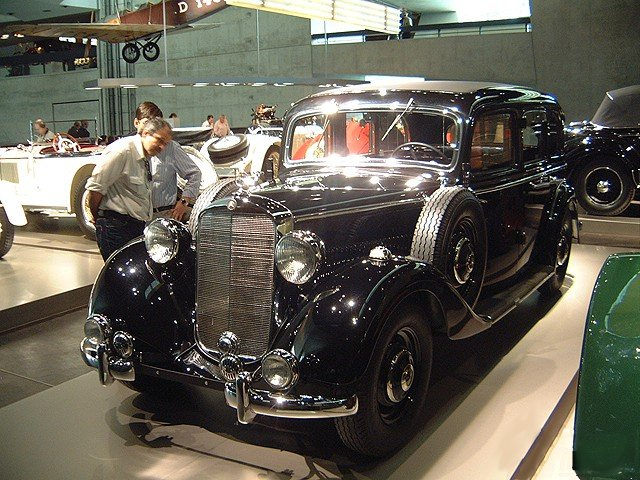
Mercedes-Benz 260D

- W07 770, full-size luxury car (1930–1938)
- W15 170 (1931-1936)
- W19 380 S, grand tourer (1932–1933)
- W22 380, large luxury car (1933-1934)
- W21 200, mid-size luxury car (1933-1936)
- W18 290, full-size luxury car (1933-1937)
- W23 130H, (1934–1936)
- W29 500K, roadster (1934–1936)
- W31 Type G4, (1934–1939)
- W30 150H, prototype sport racing car (1935–1936)
- W136 170V, mid-size car (1935-1942)
- W28 170 H (1936-1939)
- W138 260D, full-size luxury car (1936–1940)
- W29 540K, roadster (1936–1943)
- W143 230, mid-size luxury car (1937-1941)
- W152 Type G5 (1937-1941)
- W142 320, large luxury car (1937-1942)
- W149 200V (1938-1939)
- W136K 170 VK (1938-1942)
- W150 770, full-size luxury car (1938–1943)
- W153 230, mid-size luxury car (1938-1943)

=== 1940s ===
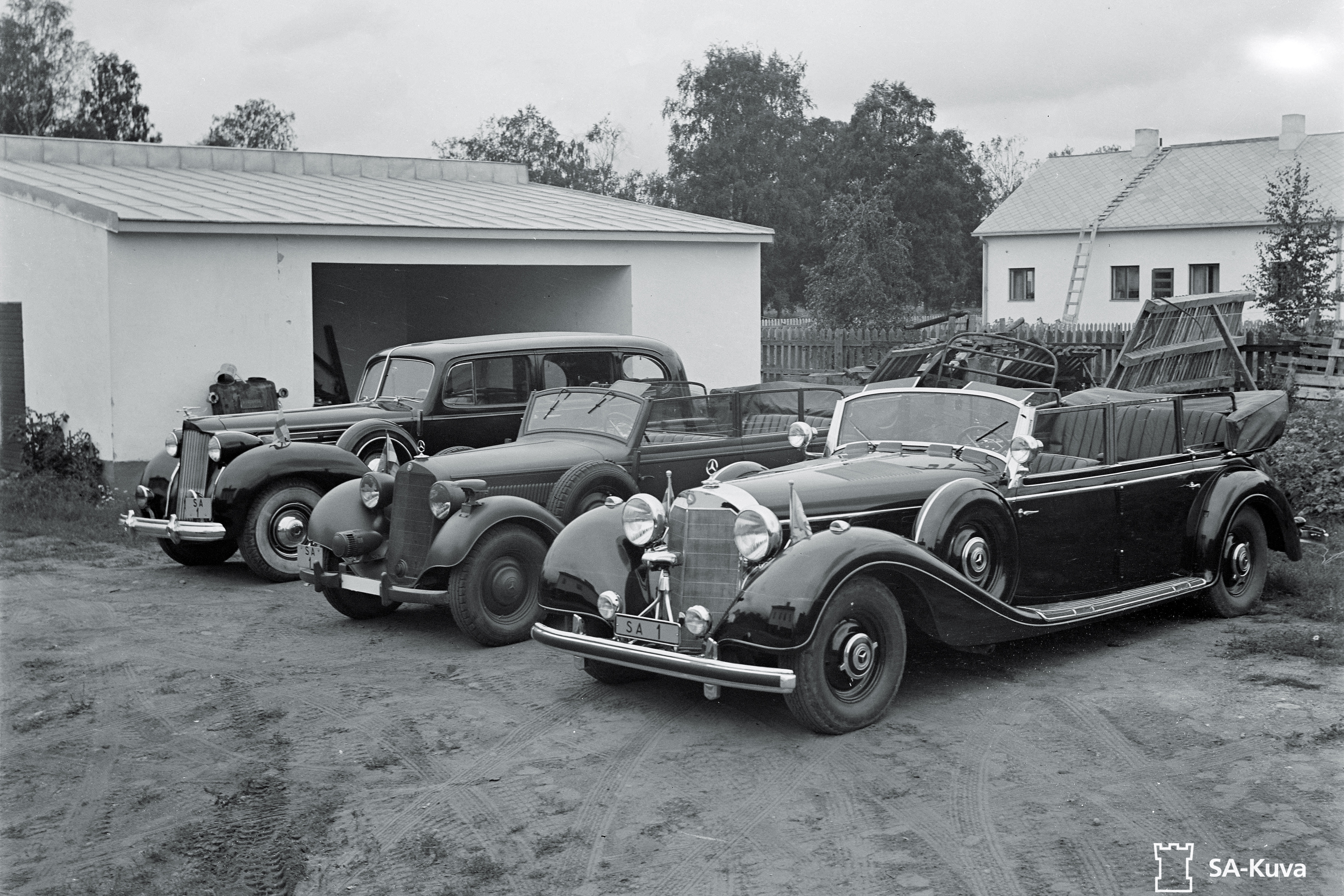
Mercedes-Benz vehicles donated by Hitler to Mannerheim

Production from 1937 to 1945 was gradually shifted to military vehicles, then to airplane and ship engines, tanks, and to guns and ammunition during World War II, with civilian vehicle production restarting in 1946.

- W136 170V, mid-size car (1946–1955)
- 170S (W136/W191), mid-size executive car (1949–1955)

=== 1950s ===
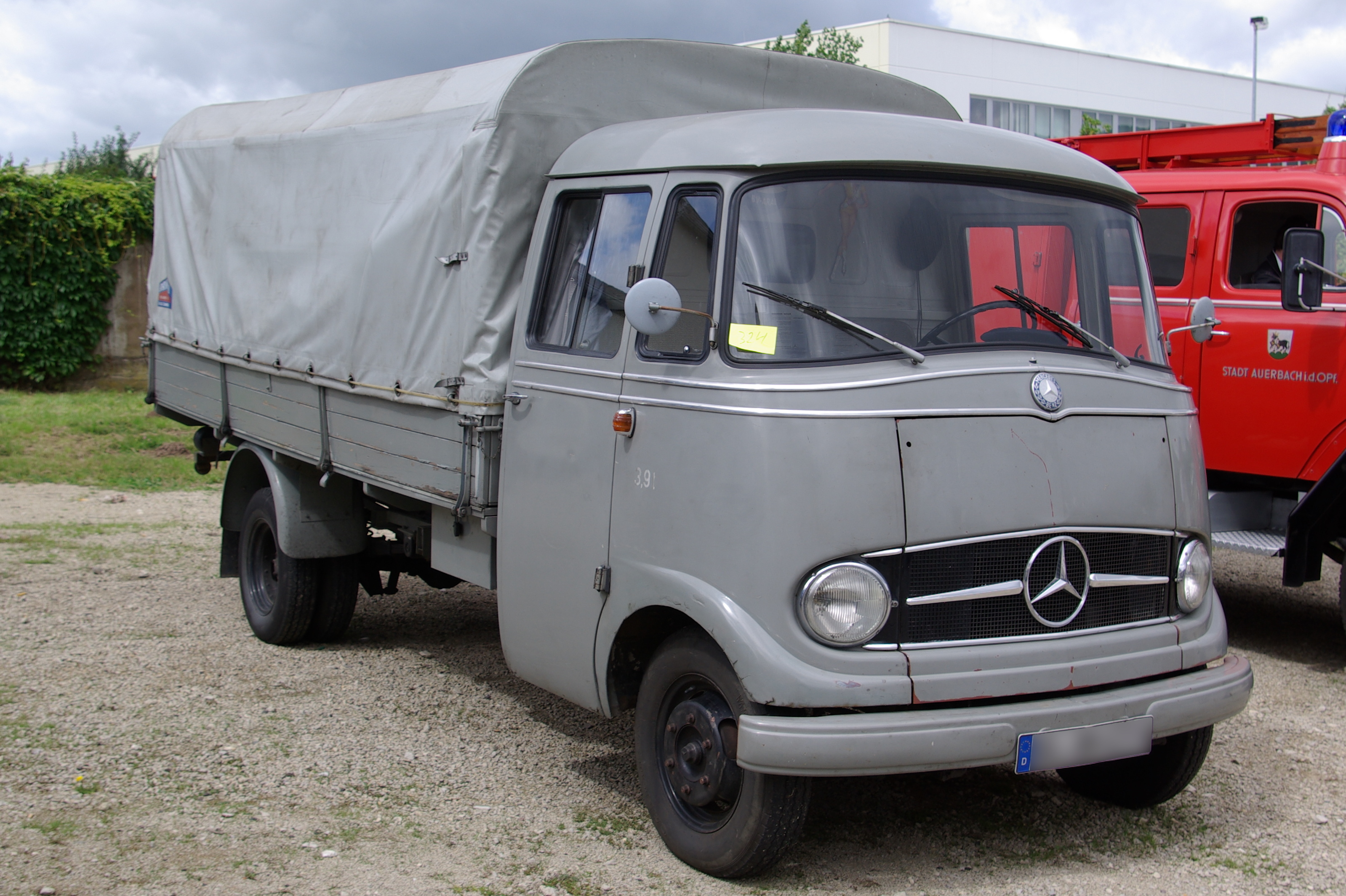
Mercedes-Benz L 319

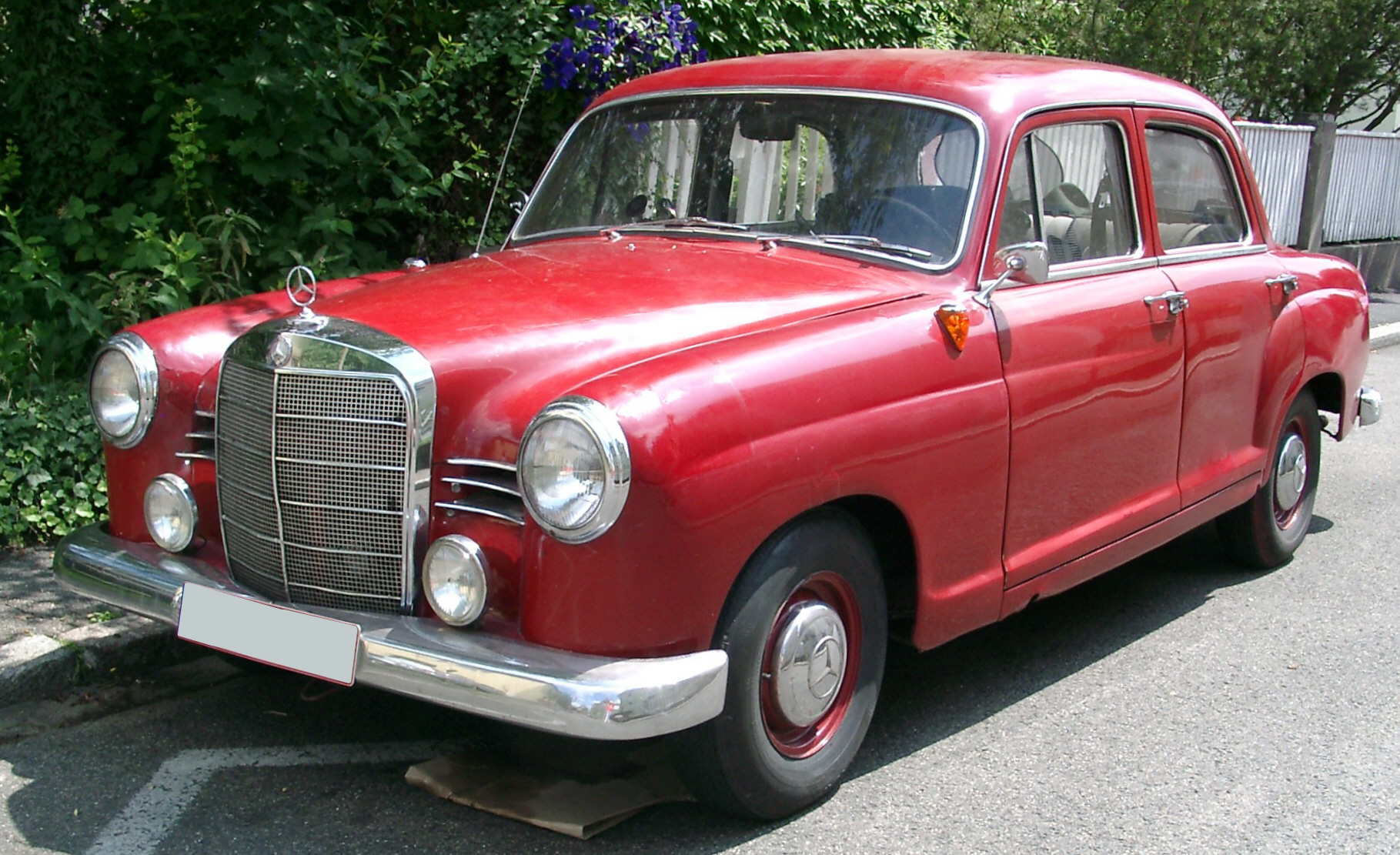
Mercedes-Benz W105 219

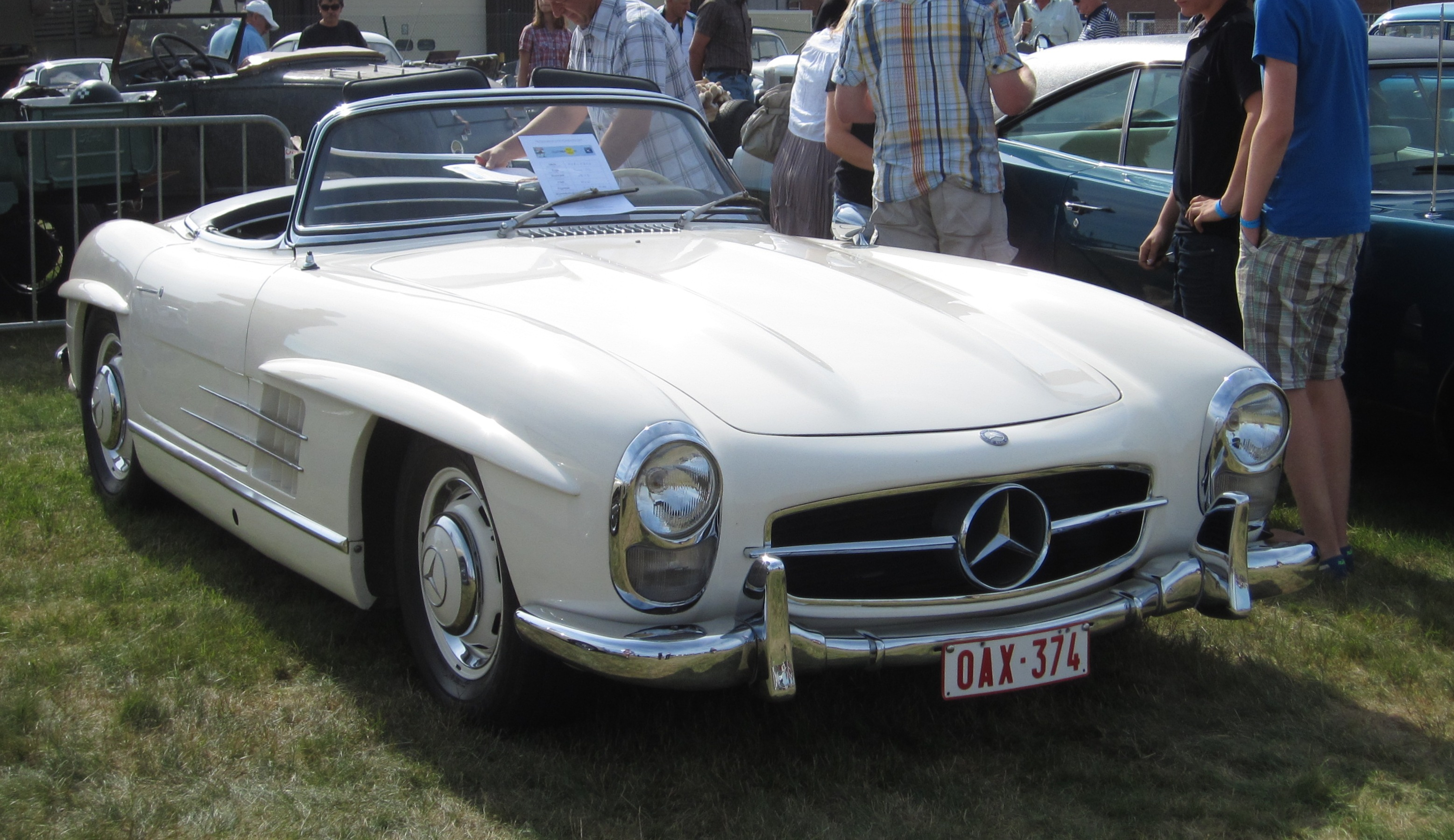
Mercedes-Benz W198 300SL roadster

- W187 220, full-size luxury car (1951–1955)
- W186 300, flagship luxury car (1951–1957)
- W188 300S/300Sc, luxury grand tourer (1951–1958)
- W120 180, mid-size executive car (1953–1962)
- W180 220a/220S, luxury car (1954–1959)
- W198 300SL, luxury sports car (1954–1963)
- R121 190SL, luxury roadster (1955–1963)
- L319, light commercial van (1955–1968)
- W105 219, four-door executive car (1956–1959)
- W121 190, mid-size executive car (1956-1961)
- W189 300d, flagship luxury car (1957–1960)
- W128 220SE, luxury car (1958–1960)
- W111 220/220S/220SE/230S/250SE/280SE, luxury car (1959–1971)

=== 1960s ===
- W110 190c/200/200D/230, mid-size luxury car (1961–1968)
- W112 300SE, full-size luxury car (1961–1967)
- W113 230SL/250SL/280SL, roadster (1963–1970)
- W100 600, full-size luxury car (1963–1981)
- W108/W109 250S/250SE/280S/280SE/280SEL/300S/300SEL, full-size luxury car (1965–1973)
- W114/W115 200/230/230/240/250/280, mid-size executive car (1968-1976)
- T2, light commercial van (1968–1996)

=== 1970s ===
- R107 SL-Class, roadster (1971–1989)
- C107 SLC-Class, grand tourer (1971–1981)
- W116 S-Class, full-size luxury car (1972–1980)
- W123, mid-size executive car (1976–1986)
- W126 S-Class, full-size luxury car (1979–1992)
- W460 G-Class, off-road SUV (1979–1990)

=== 1980s ===
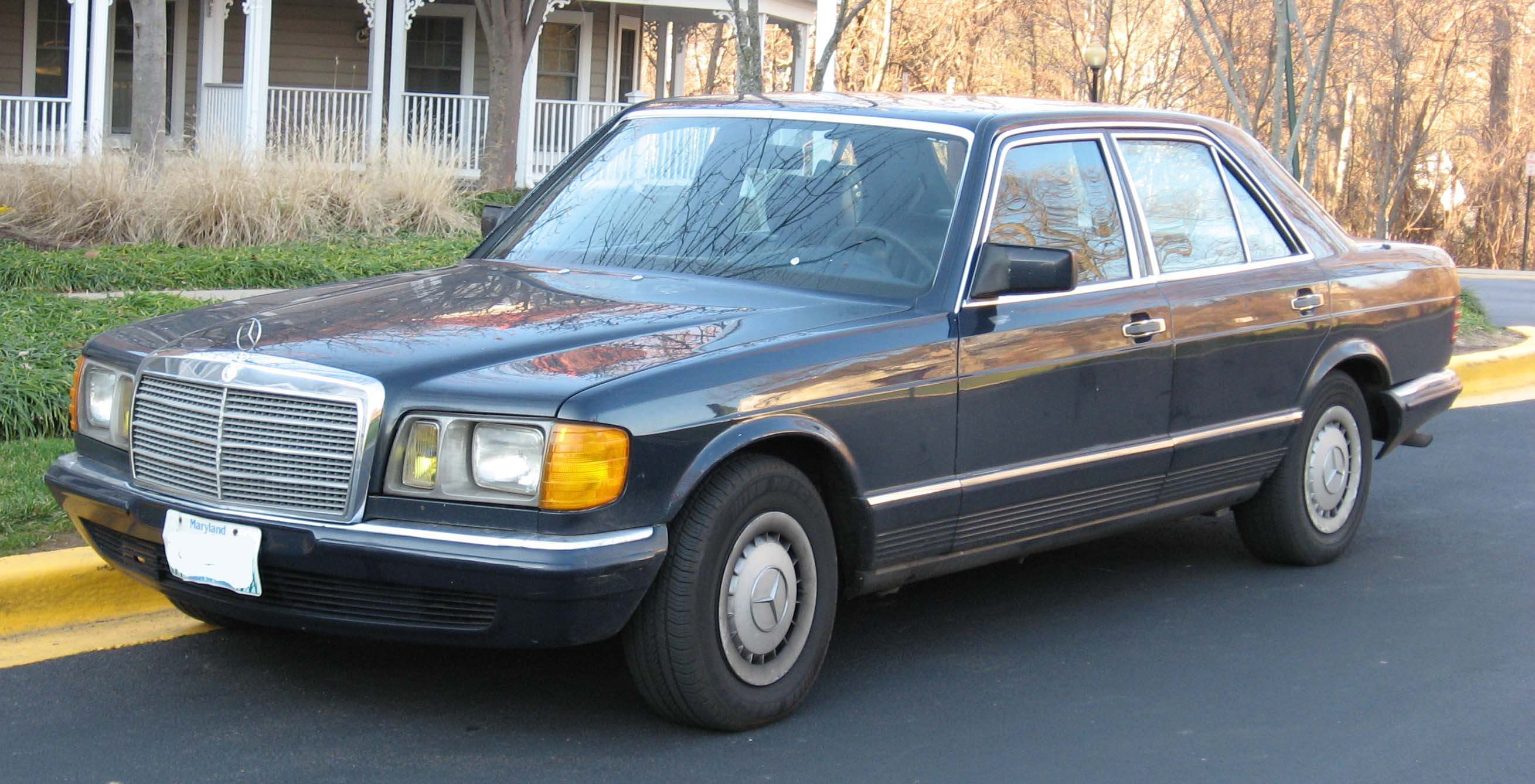
The 1980s marked a period of increasing demand in America, personified by thousands of Grey-market imported cars, such as this Mercedes-Benz 500 SE shown here

- W123, executive class car (1975-1986)
- MB100, light commercial van (1981–1995)
- W201 190, compact executive car (1982–1993)
- W124 E-Class, mid-size executive car (1985–1996)
- R129 SL-Class, grand tourer roadster (1989–2002)

=== 1990s ===
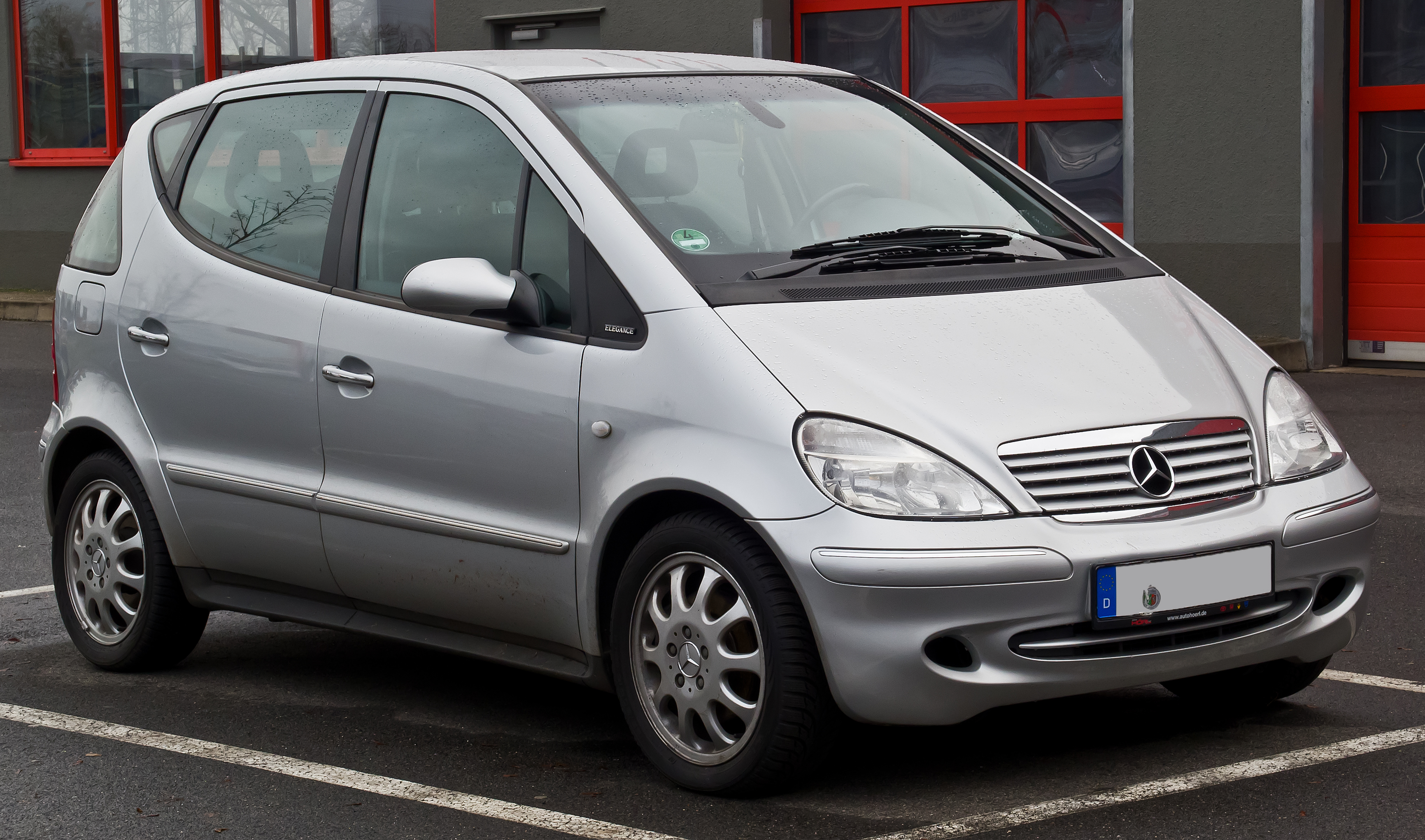
Mercedes-Benz A-Class (W168)

- W168 A-Class, subcompact car (1997–2004)
- W202 C-Class, compact executive car (1993–2000)
- C215 CL-Class, grand tourer (1998–2006)
- C208 CLK-Class, mid-size luxury car (1997–2003)
- W210 E-Class, mid-size executive car (1996–2002)
- W463 G-Class, luxury SUV (1990–2018)
- W163 M-Class, mid-size SUV (1997–2004)
- W140 S-Class, full-size luxury car (1991–1998)
- W220 S-Class, full-size luxury car (1998–2005)
- R170 SLK-Class, compact roadster (1996–2003)
- W903/T1N Sprinter, light commercial van (1995–2006)
- BM670 Vario, full-size commercial van (1996–2013)
- W638 Vito, light commercial van (1995-2005)

=== 2000s ===
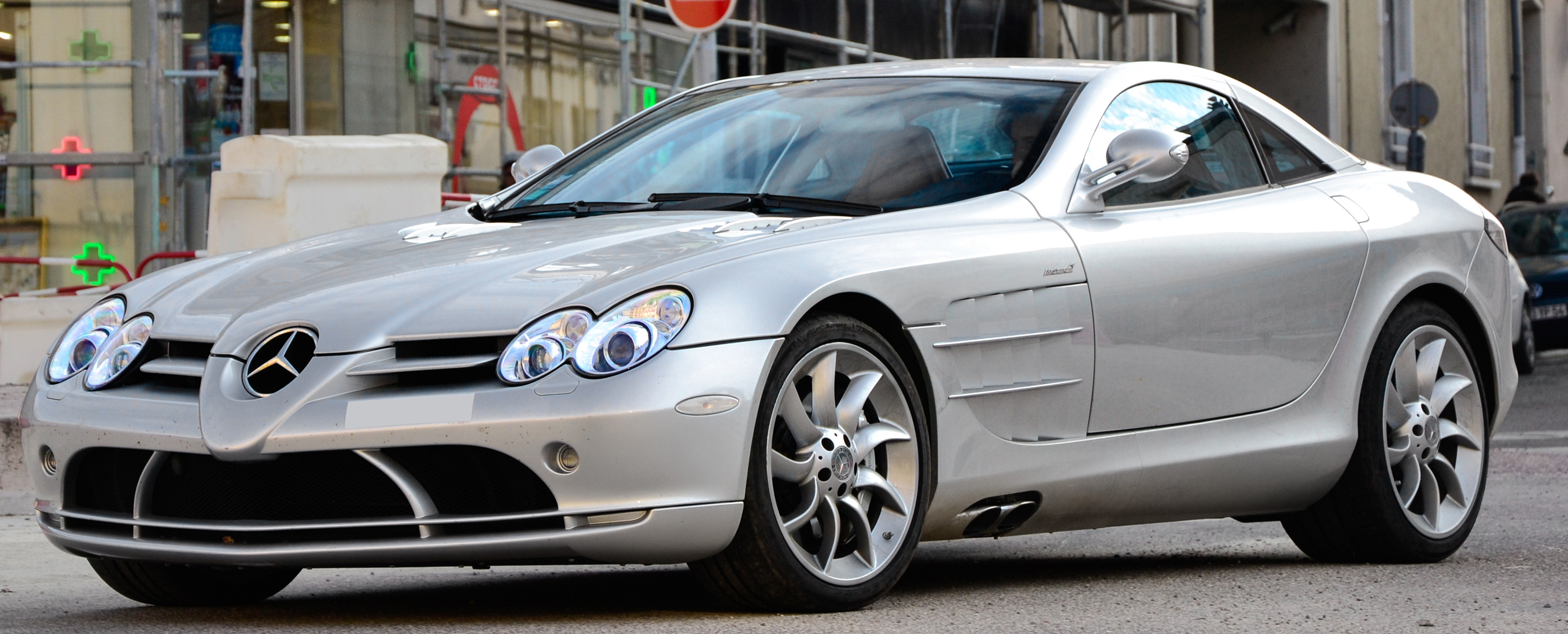
Mercedes-Benz SLR McLaren

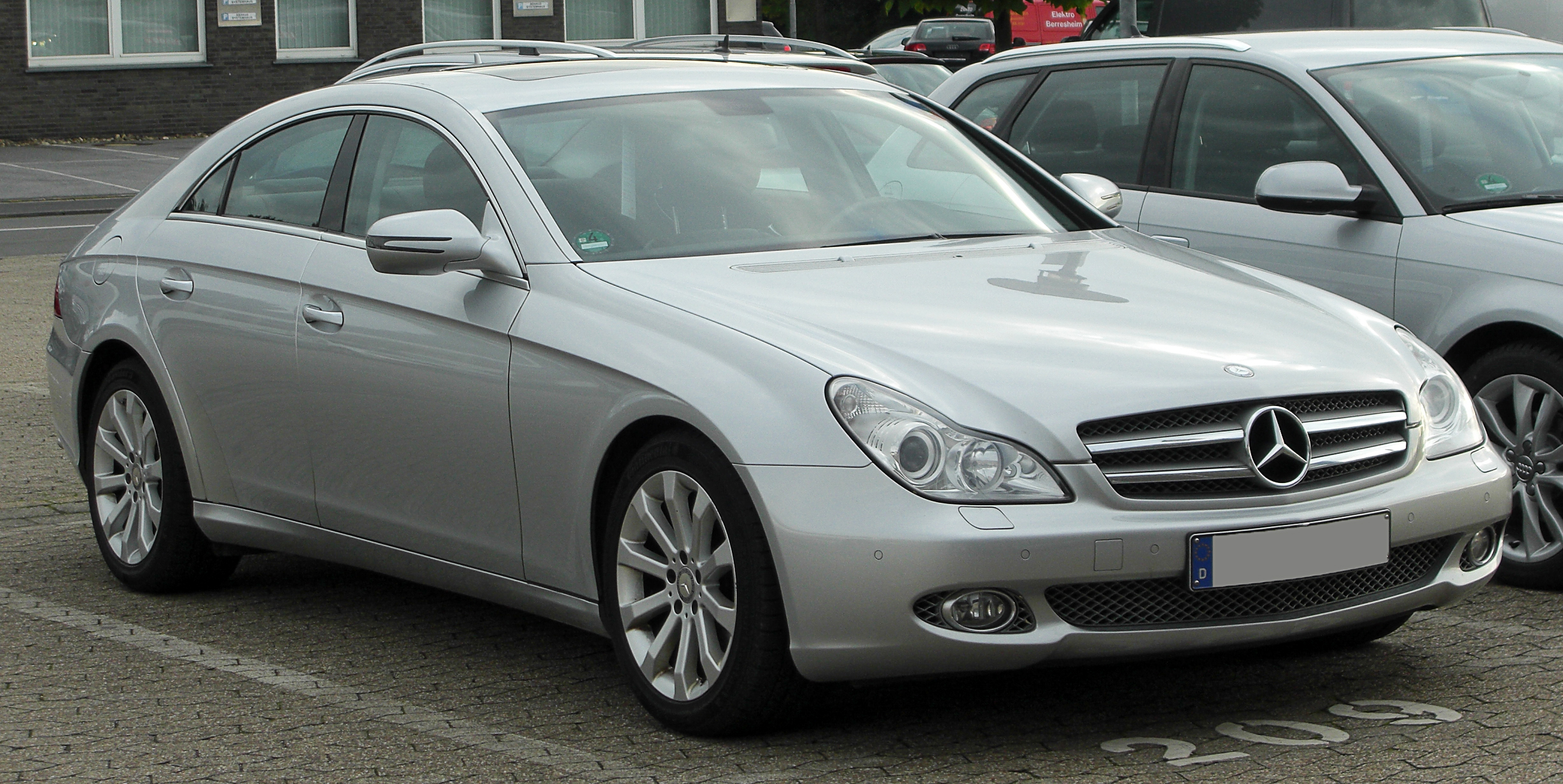
Mercedes-Benz CLS-Class (W219)

- W169 A-Class, subcompact car (2005–2011)
- W245 B-Class, subcompact MPV (2006–2011)
- W203 C-Class, compact executive car (2001–2007)
- W204 C-Class, compact executive car (2008–2013)
- C216 CL-Class, grand tourer (2006–2014)
- C209 CLK-Class, mid-size luxury car (2002–2010)
- W219 CLS-Class, mid-size luxury car (2004–2010)
- W211 E-Class, mid-size executive car (2003–2008)
- W212 E-Class, mid-size executive car (2009–2016)
- X164 GL-Class, full-size luxury SUV (2006–2012)
- X204 GLK-Class, compact luxury crossover (2008–2015)
- W164 M-Class, mid-size luxury SUV (2005–2011)
- W251 R-Class, luxury MPV (2005–2017)
- W221 S-Class, full-size luxury car (2006–2013)
- R230 SL-Class, grand tourer (2001–2011)
- R171 SLK-Class, compact roadster (2004–2010)
- C199 SLR McLaren, grand tourer (2003–2010)
- W906 NCV3 Sprinter, light commercial van (2006–2018)
- W414 Vaneo, compact MPV (2002–2005)
- W639 Vito, light commercial van (2003–2014)

=== 2010s ===
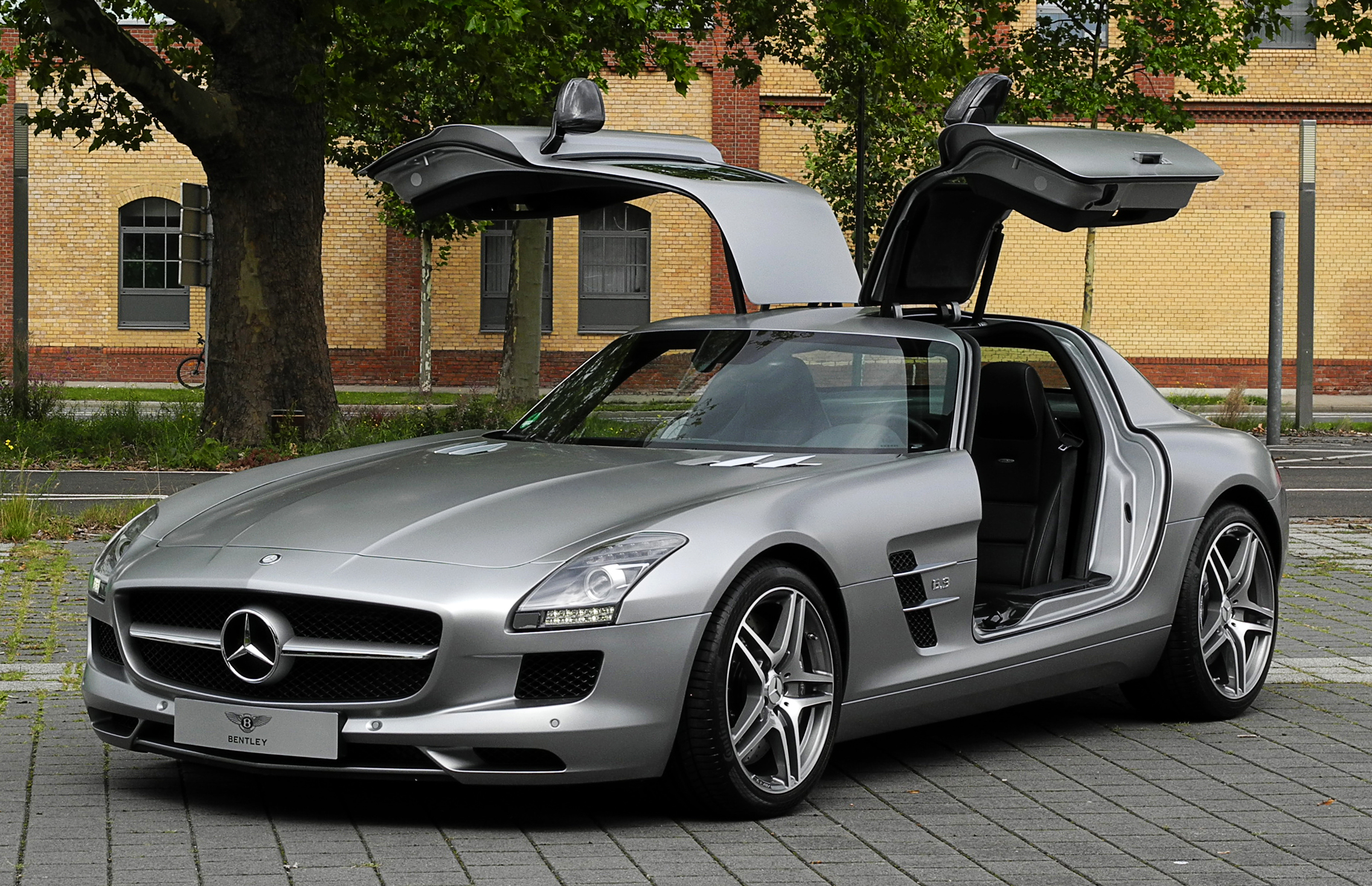
Mercedes-Benz SLS

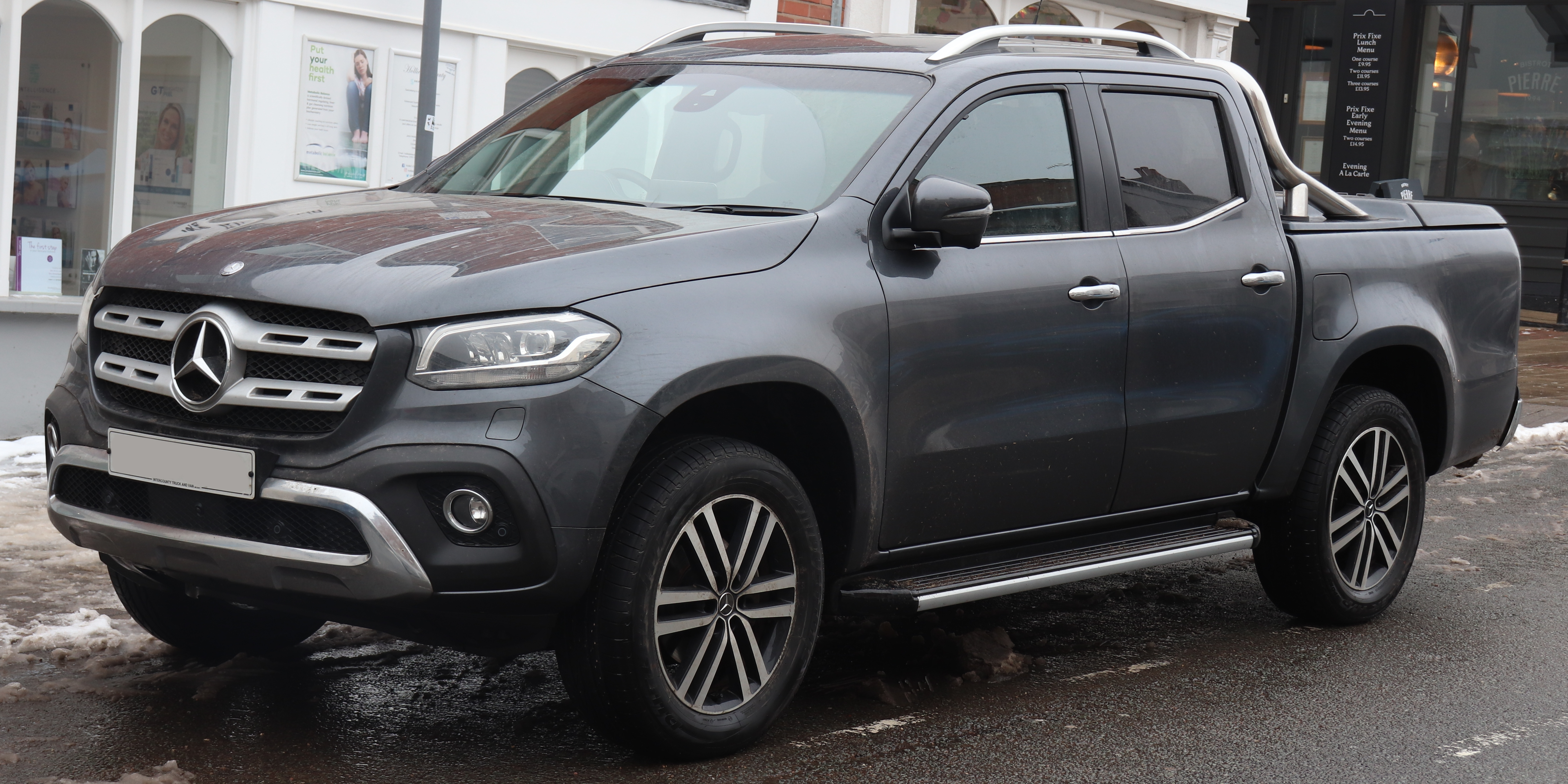
Mercedes-Benz X-Class (X470)

- C197 SLS AMG, sports car (2010–2014)
- W218 CLS, mid-size luxury car (2011–2018)
- R172 SLK, compact roadster (2011–2020)
- W246 B-Class, subcompact MPV (2012–2018)
- X166 GL-Class, full-size luxury SUV (2012–2019)
- W415 Citan, MPV van (2012–2021)
- W176 A-Class, subcompact car (2013–2018)
- R231 SL-Class, grand tourer roadster (2013–2020)
- W222 S-Class, full-size luxury car (2013–2023)
- C117 CLA, subcompact executive car (2013–2019)
- X156 GLA, subcompact luxury crossover (2013–2019)
- W205 C-Class, compact executive car (2014–2021)
- W447 Vito, light commercial van (2014–present)
- C190 AMG GT, sports car (2015–2023)
- X253 GLC, compact luxury SUV (2015–2022)
- W213 E-Class, mid-size executive car (2016–2023)
- W470 X-Class, luxury pickup truck (2017–2020)
- W177 A-Class, subcompact car (2018–present)
- C257 CLS, mid-size luxury car (2018–2023)
- X290 AMG GT 4-Door Coupé, Executive Car, 5 door liftback (2019–2026)
- W463 G-Class, mid-size luxury SUV (2018–2024)
- N293 EQC, fully electric compact SUV (2019–2023)
- C118 CLA, subcompact executive car (2019–2025)
- W167 GLE, mid-size SUV (2019–present)
- W247 B-Class, subcompact MPV (2019–2026)
- X247 GLB, compact luxury SUV (2019–2026)
- X167 GLS, full-size luxury SUV (2019–present)

=== 2020s ===
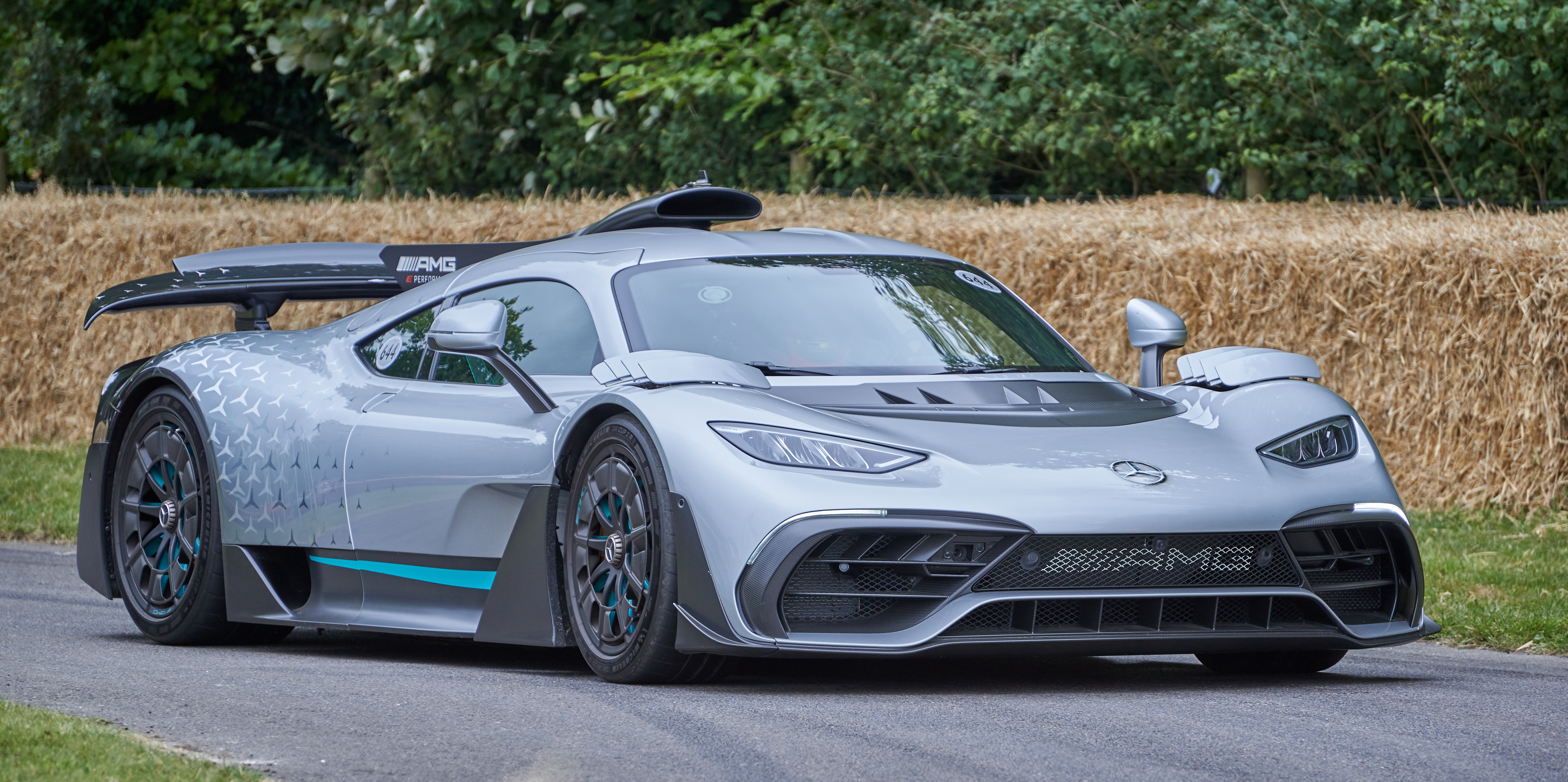
Mercedes-AMG ONE

- H247 GLA, subcompact luxury crossover (2020–present)
- W223 S-Class, full-size luxury saloon (2020–present)
- W206 C-Class, compact executive car (2021–present)
- W420 Citan, MPV van (2021–2026)
- H243 EQA, electric subcompact luxury crossover (2021–present)
- X243 EQB, electric compact luxury crossover (2021–2026)
- V297 EQS, electric full-size liftback (2021–present)
- R232 AMG SL, grand tourer roadster (2022–present)
- V295 EQE, electric executive saloon (2022–present)
- R50 AMG ONE, limited production plug-in hybrid super sports car (2022–2025)
- X254 GLC, compact luxury crossover (2022–present)
- X296 EQS SUV, electric full-size luxury SUV (2022–present)
- X294 EQE SUV, electric mid-size luxury SUV (2023–present)
- W214 E-Class, mid-size executive car (2023–present)
- C236 CLE, Grand tourer (2023–present)
- C192 AMG GT, sports car (2023–present)
- W465 G-Class, mid-size luxury SUV (2024–present)
- C178 CLA, subcompact executive car (2025–present)
- X540 GLC Electric, electric compact luxury crossover (2026–present)
- X244 GLB, compact luxury SUV (2026–present)
- VLE, electric large luxury MPV (2026–present)
- W520 C-Class Electric, electric compact executive car (2026–present)
- C590 AMG GT 4-Door Coupé, electric executive Car, 5 door liftback (2026–present)

== Concept cars ==
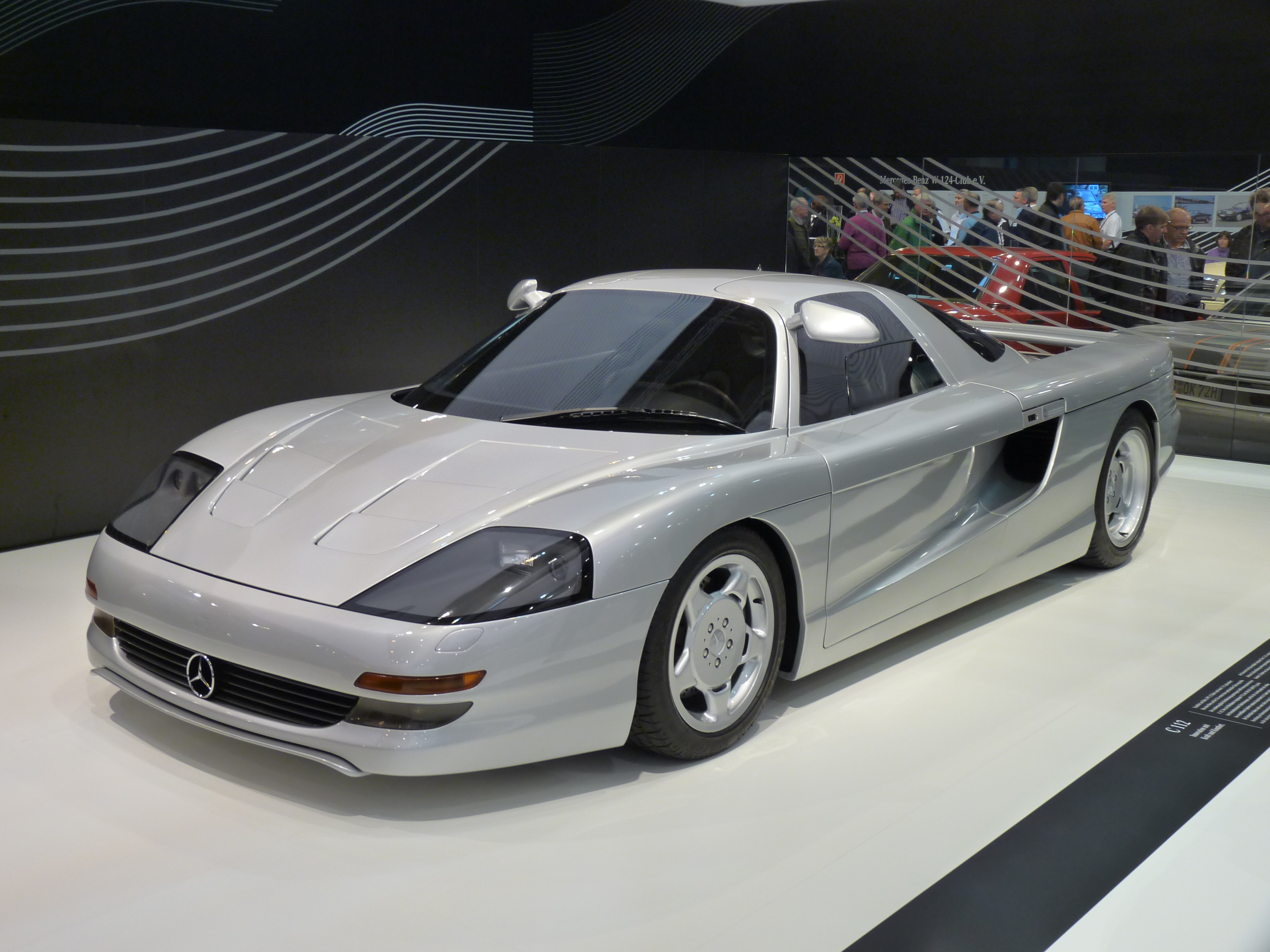
Mercedes-Benz C112 (1991)

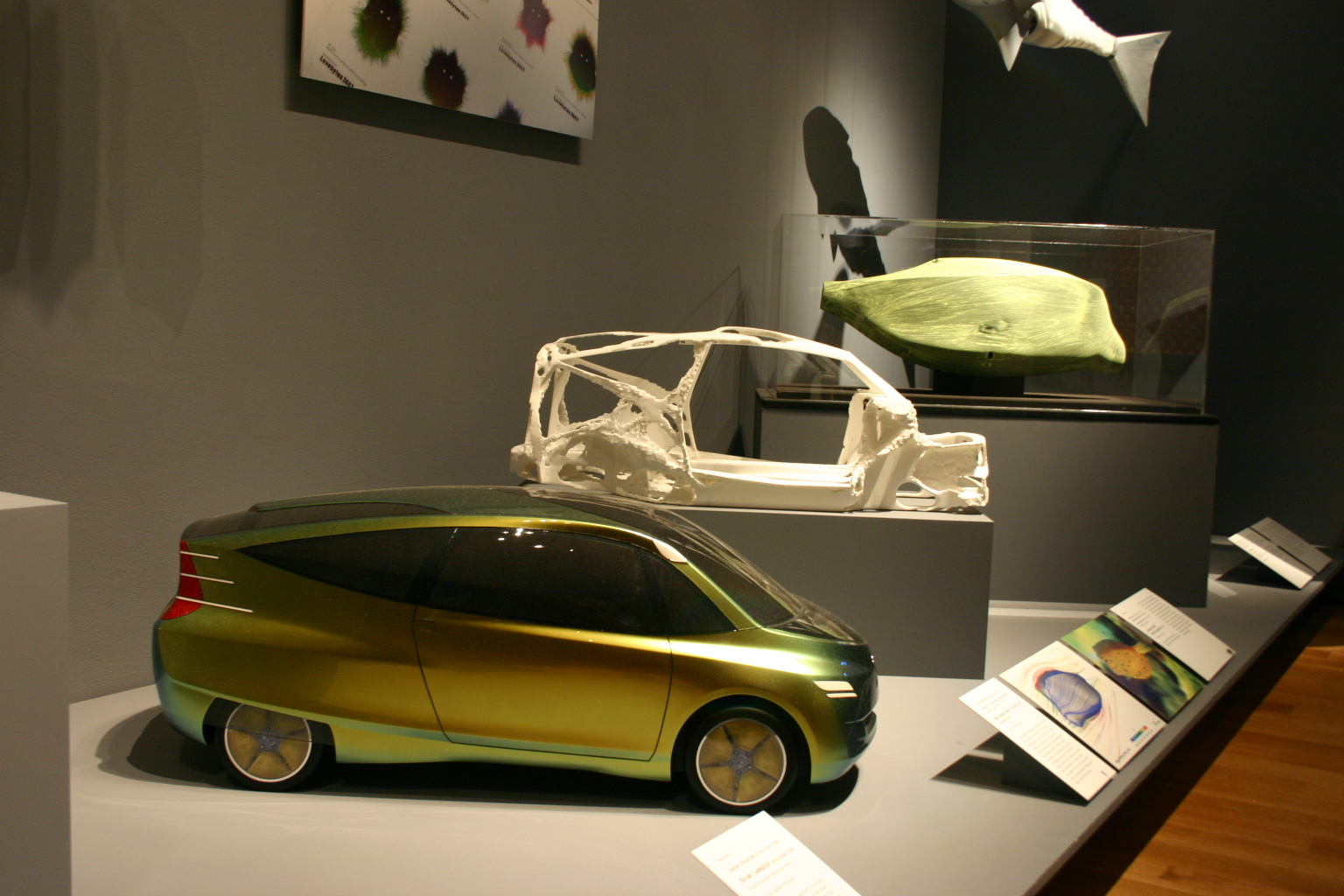
Mercedes-Benz Bionic inspired by the yellow boxfish resulting a high volume to low drag ratio (2005)

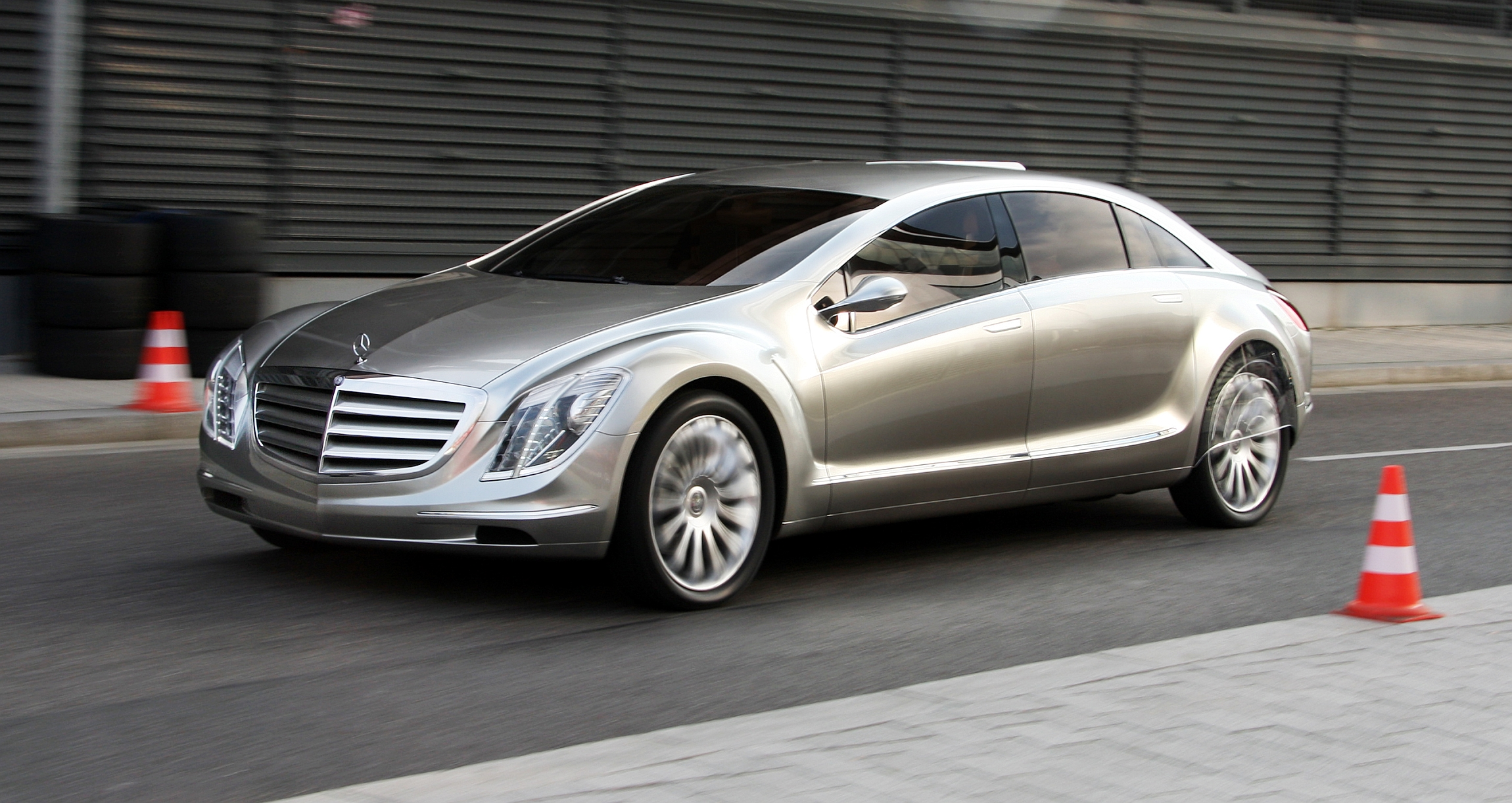
F700 concept car (2007)

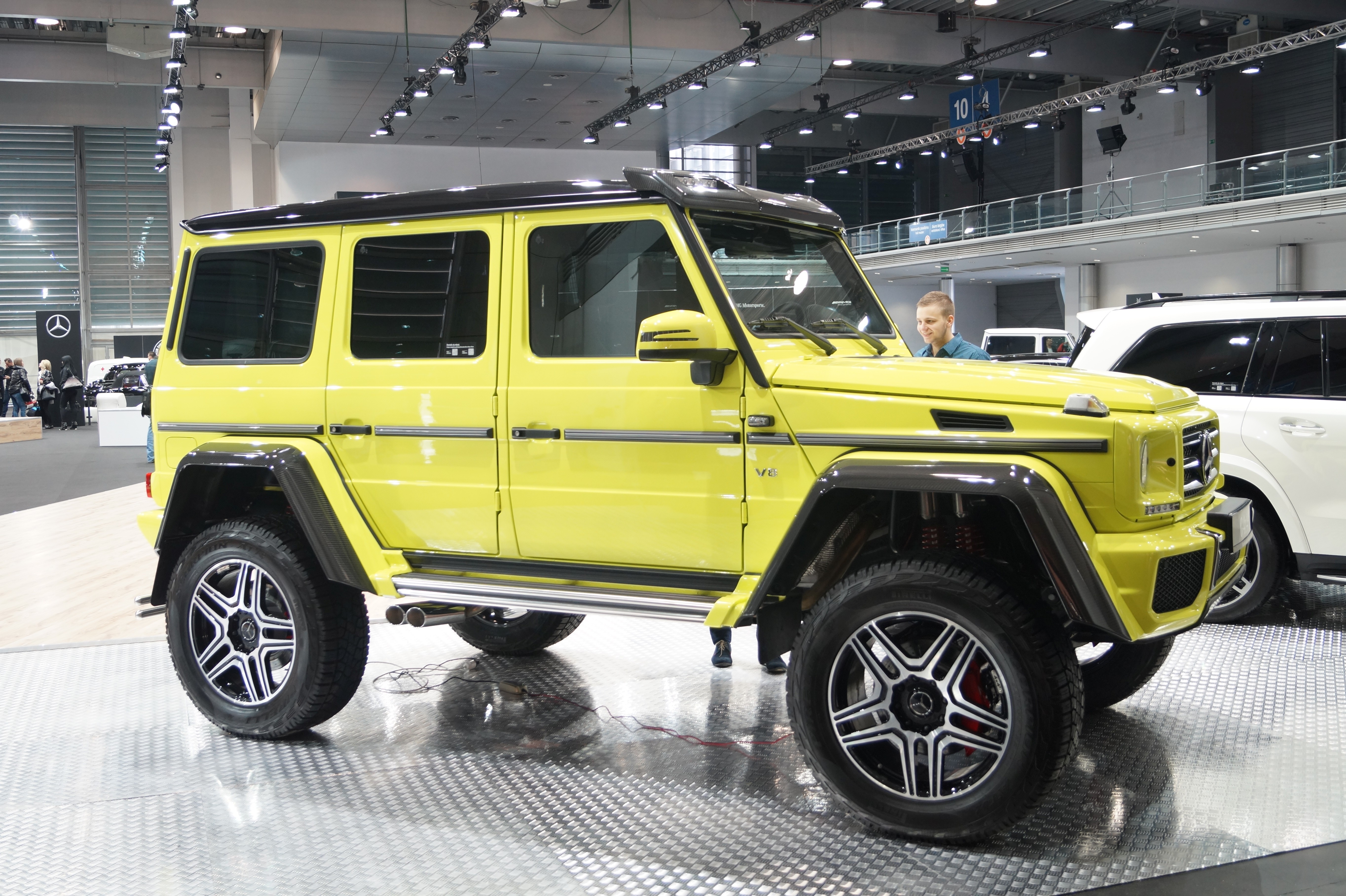
G500 4×4² concept (2015)

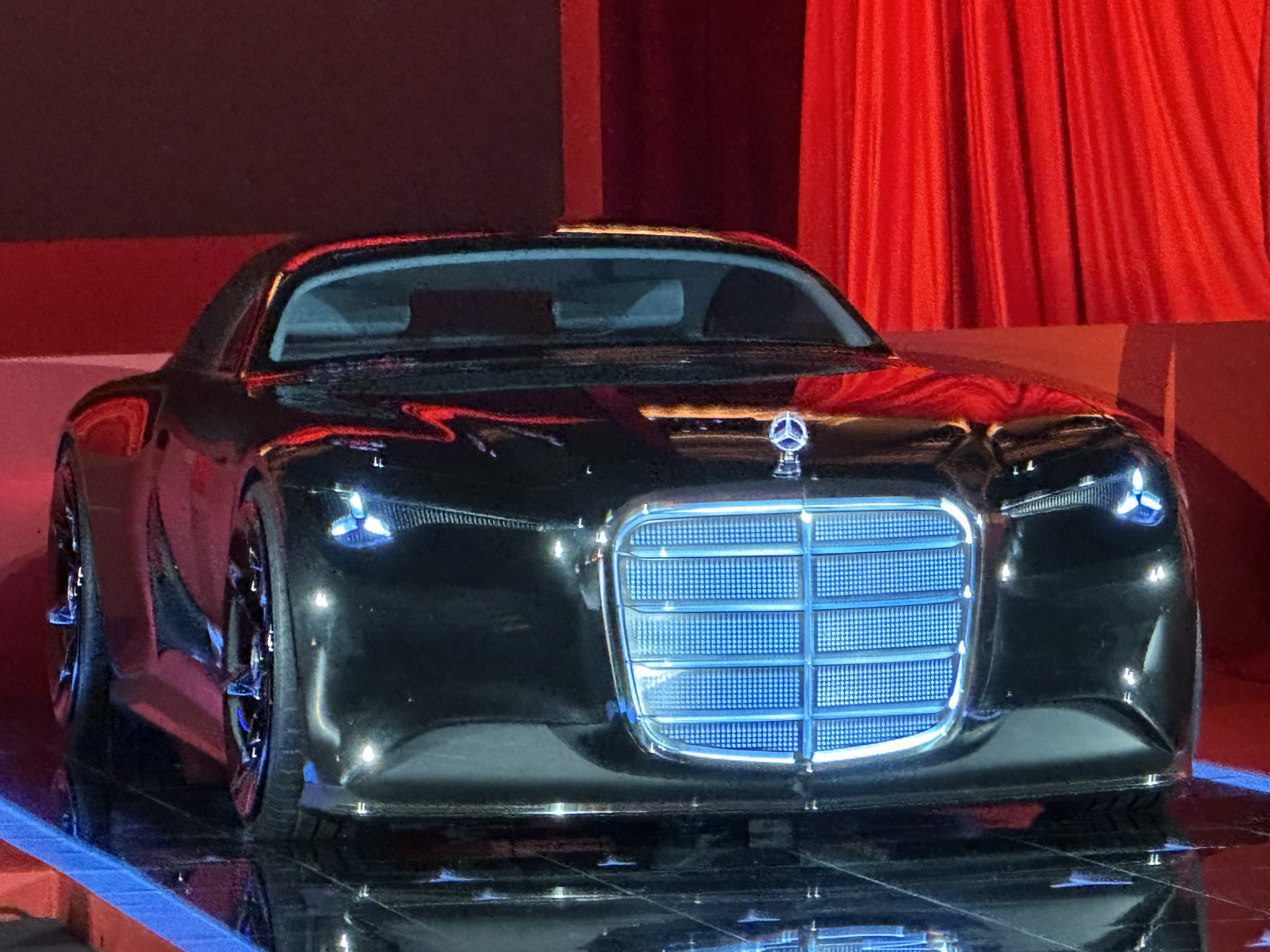
Vision Iconic concept (2025)

=== 1920s ===
- 1926 Mercedes-Benz M 23 D (W01)
- 1926 Mercedes-Benz 5/25 PS (W01)
- 1926-1928 Mercedes-Benz G1 (W103)
- 1928 Mercedes-Benz 5/25 PS (W14)

=== 1930s ===
- 1931–1932 Mercedes-Benz 120H (W17)
- 1933 Mercedes-Benz 175 (W25D)
- 1934-1936 Mercedes-Benz 150V (W130)
- 1935 Mercedes-Benz 170VG (W133 III)
- 1936 Mercedes-Benz 170VL (W139)
- 1936–1937 Mercedes-Benz 130VB (W144)
- 1936–1937 Mercedes-Benz 190VB (W145)
- 1936–1937 Mercedes-Benz 260VB (W146)
- 1938 Mercedes-Benz 400V (W147)
  - 1938 Mercedes-Benz 400VM (W160)
  - 1938 Mercedes-Benz 400VMS (W161)
- 1939–1940 Mercedes-Benz 580K (W129); intended as a 540K successor
- 1939 Mercedes-Benz T80

=== 1940s ===
- 1940 Mercedes-Benz 260, 260 LWB (W159)
- 1941–1942 Mercedes-Benz 600V (W148); intended as a 770 successor
- 1941–1942 Mercedes-Benz 600K (W148)
- 1941–1942 Mercedes-Benz 600K (W157); intended as a 580K successor

=== 1960s ===
- 1966 Mercedes-Benz SL-X
- 1969 Mercedes-Benz C111

=== 1970s ===
- 1978 Mercedes-Benz CW311

=== 1980s ===
- 1981 Mercedes-Benz Auto 2000
- 1982 Mercedes-Benz NAFA

=== 1990s ===
- 1991 Mercedes-Benz C112
- 1991 Mercedes-Benz F100
- 1993 Mercedes-Benz Coupe Concept
- 1993 Mercedes-Benz Vision A93 Concept
- 1994 Mercedes-Benz S500 Shooting Brake
- 1994 Mercedes-Benz FCC
- 1994 Mercedes-Benz SLK I and II
- 1995 Mercedes-Benz Vario Research Car
- 1996 Mercedes-Benz F200 Imagination
- 1996 Mercedes-Benz AAV
- 1997 Mercedes-Benz F300 Life Jet
- 1999 Mercedes-Benz Vision SLR

=== 2000s ===
- 2000 Mercedes-Benz Vision SLA
- 2002 Mercedes-Benz Vision GST
- 2002 Mercedes-Benz F400 Carving
- 2003 Mercedes-Benz Vision CLS
- 2003 Mercedes-Benz F500 Mind
- 2004 Mercedes-Benz Vision-B
- 2004 Mercedes-Benz Vision-R
- 2005 Mercedes-Benz F600 HYGENIUS
- 2005 Mercedes-Benz Bionic
- 2007 Mercedes-Benz Ocean Drive
- 2007 Mercedes-Benz F700
- 2008 Mercedes-Benz ConceptFASCINATION
- 2009 Mercedes-Benz BlueZERO
- 2009 Mercedes-Benz F-Cell Roadster

=== 2010s ===
- 2010 Mercedes-Benz F800 Style
- 2010 Mercedes-Benz BIOME
- 2010 Mercedes-Benz BlitzenBenz
- 2011 Mercedes-Benz F125
- 2011 Mercedes-Benz Silver Lightning
- 2011 Mercedes-Benz Unimog Concept
- 2012 Mercedes-Benz Concept Style Coupé
- 2012 Mercedes-Benz Ener-G-Force
- 2013 Mercedes-Benz Concept GLA SUV
- 2013 Mercedes-Benz AMG Vision Gran Turismo
- 2014 Mercedes-Benz Vision G-Code
- 2015 Mercedes-Benz Intelligent Aerodynamic Automobile
- 2015 Mercedes-Benz F 015
- 2015 Mercedes-Benz G500 4×4²
- 2016 Mercedes-Benz Vision Mercedes-Maybach 6
- 2016 Mercedes-Benz Vision Van
- 2017 Mercedes-Benz EQA
- 2017 Mercedes-Maybach 6 Cabriolet
- 2018 Mercedes-Benz EQ Silver Arrow
- 2018 Mercedes-Benz Vision Urbanetic
- 2019 Mercedes-Benz Concept GLB
- 2019 Mercedes-Benz Vision EQS
- 2019 Mercedes-Benz Vision Mercedes Simplex

=== 2020s ===
- 2020 Mercedes-Benz Vision AVTR
- 2021 Mercedes-Benz EQG
- 2021 Mercedes-Benz Concept EQT
- 2021 Mercedes-Benz Maybach EQS
- 2022 Mercedes-Benz Vision EQXX
- 2023 Mercedes-Benz Vision AMG
- 2023 Mercedes-Benz Concept CLA
- 2023 Mercedes-Benz Vision One-Eleven
- 2025 Mercedes-Benz Vision V
- 2025 Mercedes-AMG Concept GT XX
- 2025 Mercedes-Benz Vision Iconic

== Motorsport cars ==
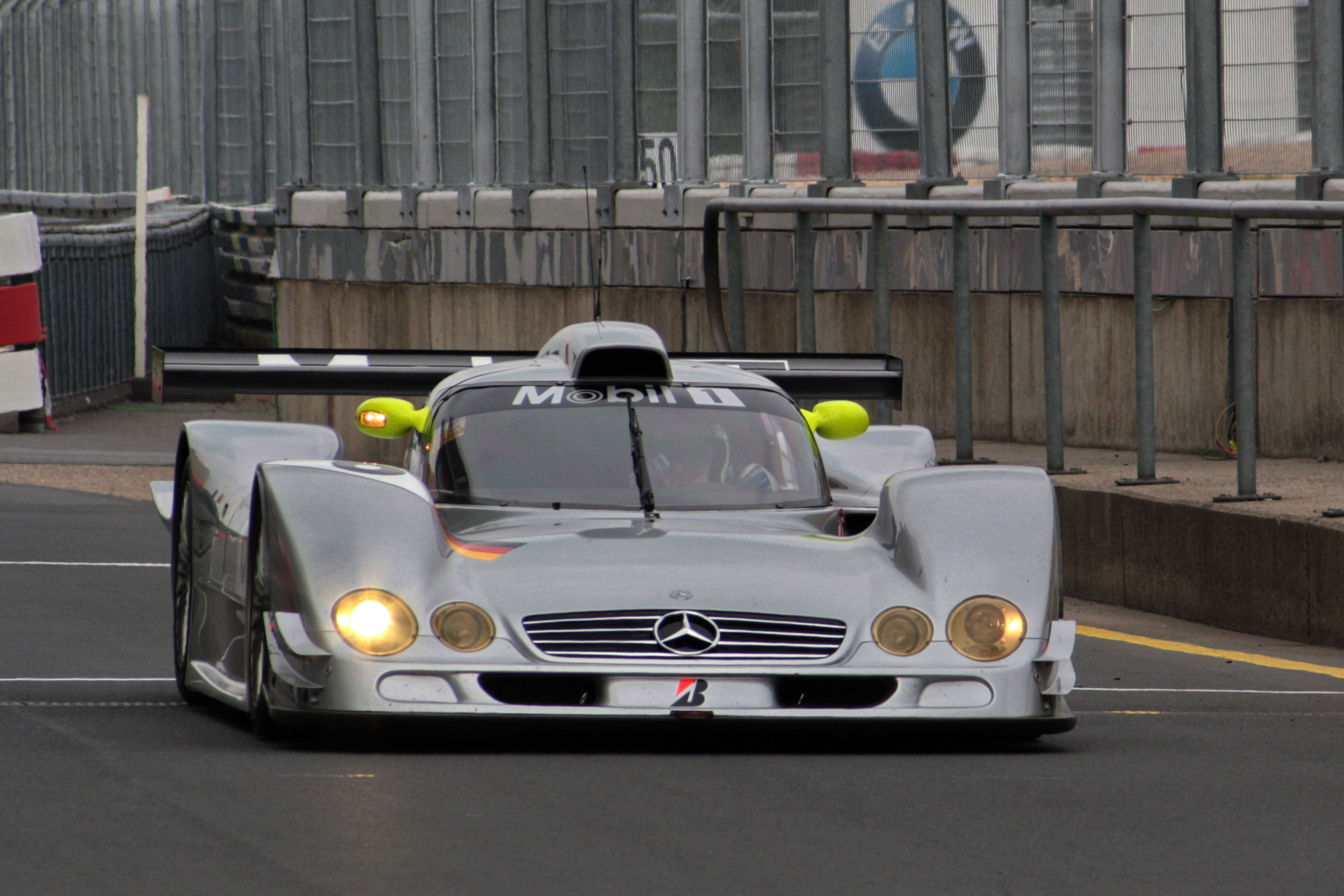
Mercedes-Benz CLR

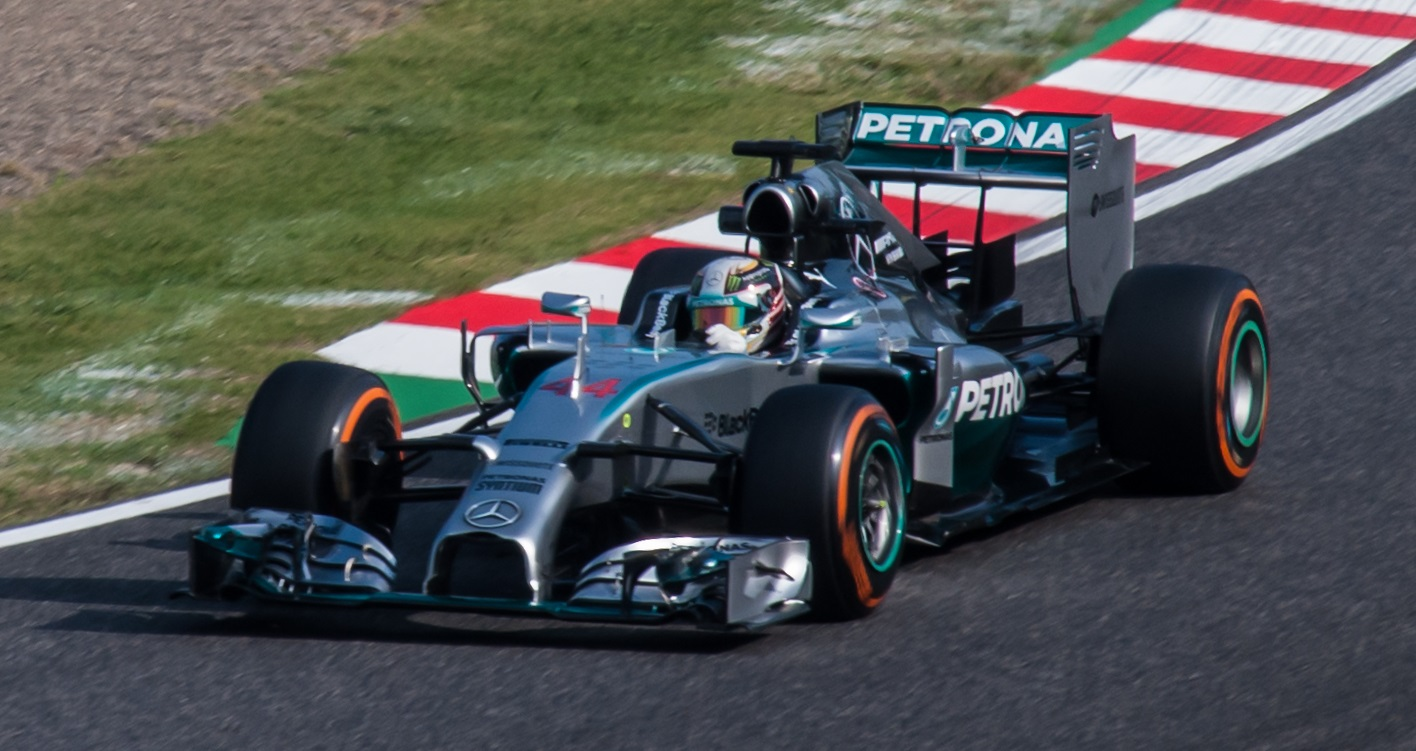
Mercedes F1 W05 Hybrid

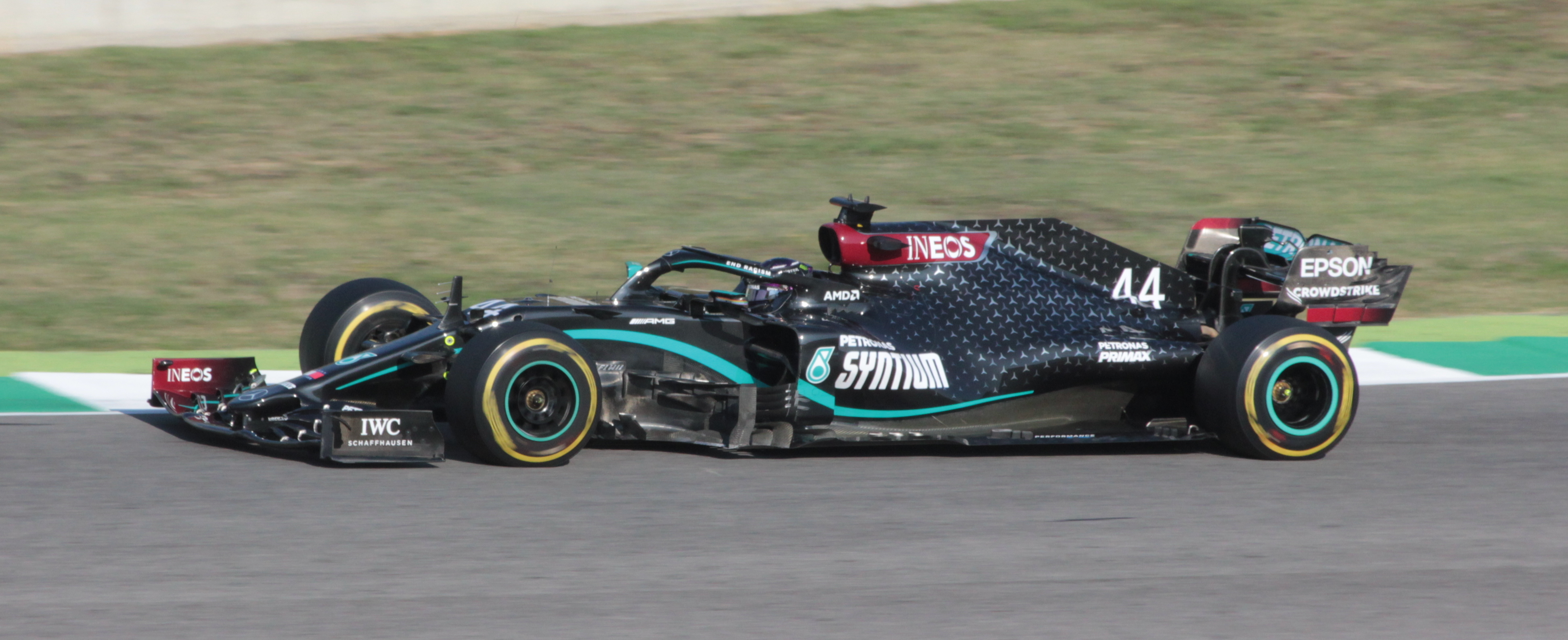
Mercedes-AMG F1 W11 EQ Performance

See Mercedes-Benz in motorsport

- 1923 Benz Tropfenwagen
- 1928–1932 Mercedes-Benz SSK Rennwagen
- 1934 Mercedes-Benz W25
- 1937 Mercedes-Benz W125
- 1938–1939 Mercedes-Benz W154
- 1939 Mercedes-Benz W165
- 1952 Mercedes-Benz W194
- 1955 Mercedes-Benz 300 SLR
- 1985 Sauber C8
- 1987 Sauber Mercedes-Benz C9
- 1990 Mercedes-Benz C11
- 1991 Mercedes-Benz C291
- 1992 Mercedes-Benz C292
- 1997–1998 Mercedes-Benz CLK GTR
- 1999 Mercedes-Benz CLR
- 2004–2006 Mercedes-Benz AMG C-Class DTM (W203)
- 2007–2011 Mercedes-Benz AMG C-Class DTM (W204)
- 2011–2018 Mercedes-AMG C-Coupé DTM

=== Formula One ===
- 1954–1955 Mercedes-Benz W196
- 2010 Mercedes MGP W01
- 2011 Mercedes MGP W02
- 2012 Mercedes F1 W03
- 2013 Mercedes F1 W04
- 2014 Mercedes F1 W05 Hybrid
- 2015 Mercedes F1 W06 Hybrid
- 2016 Mercedes F1 W07 Hybrid
- 2017 Mercedes AMG F1 W08 EQ Power+
- 2018 Mercedes AMG F1 W09 EQ Power+
- 2019 Mercedes AMG F1 W10 EQ Power+
- 2020 Mercedes-AMG F1 W11 EQ Performance
- 2021 Mercedes-AMG F1 W12 E Performance
- 2022 Mercedes-AMG F1 W13 E Performance
- 2023 Mercedes-AMG F1 W14 E Performance
- 2024 Mercedes-AMG F1 W15 E Performance
- 2025 Mercedes-AMG F1 W16 E Performance
- 2026 Mercedes-AMG F1 W17 E Performance

=== Formula E ===
- 2019–2020 Mercedes-Benz EQ Silver Arrow 01
- 2020/2021–2021/2022 Mercedes-EQ Silver Arrow 02

== Buses ==
- Citaro: low floor city and interurban bus available in standard, midi and articulated produced since 1997
- Tourismo: tourist coach produced since 1994
- Travego: tourist coach produced since 1999
- Atego coach: a chassis produced for external coach bodywork
- Sprinter minibus: a converted cargo van produced since 1995
- Cito: a low-floor midibus built by EvoBus for Continental Europe between 1999 and 2003 with diesel-electric transmission
- Tourrider: motorcoach produced for North America since 2021

== Related brands ==
=== Cars ===
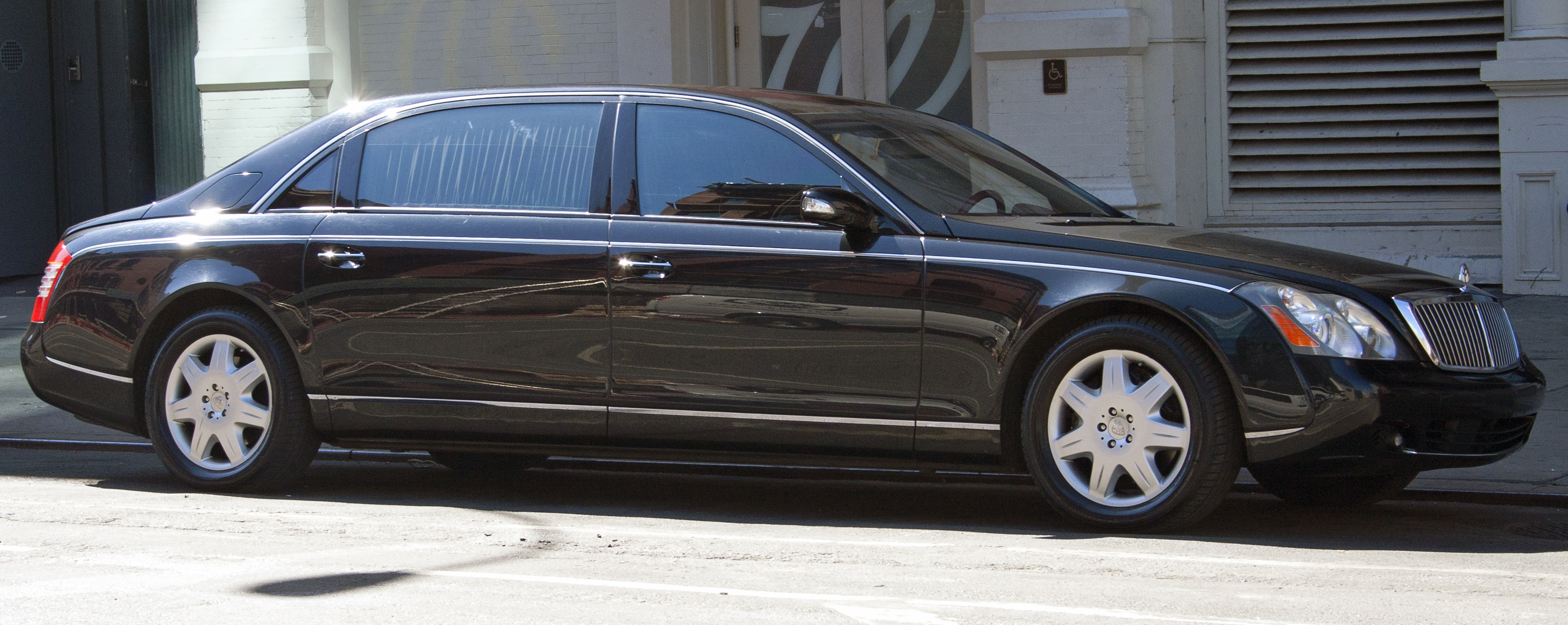
Maybach 62

- Mercedes-AMG, high-performance brand
- Maybach, ultra-luxury sub-brand
- Smart, automotive division
- DaimlerChrysler, former subsidiary
- BharatBenz, Indian division
- McLaren, co-produced the SLR sports car

=== Others ===
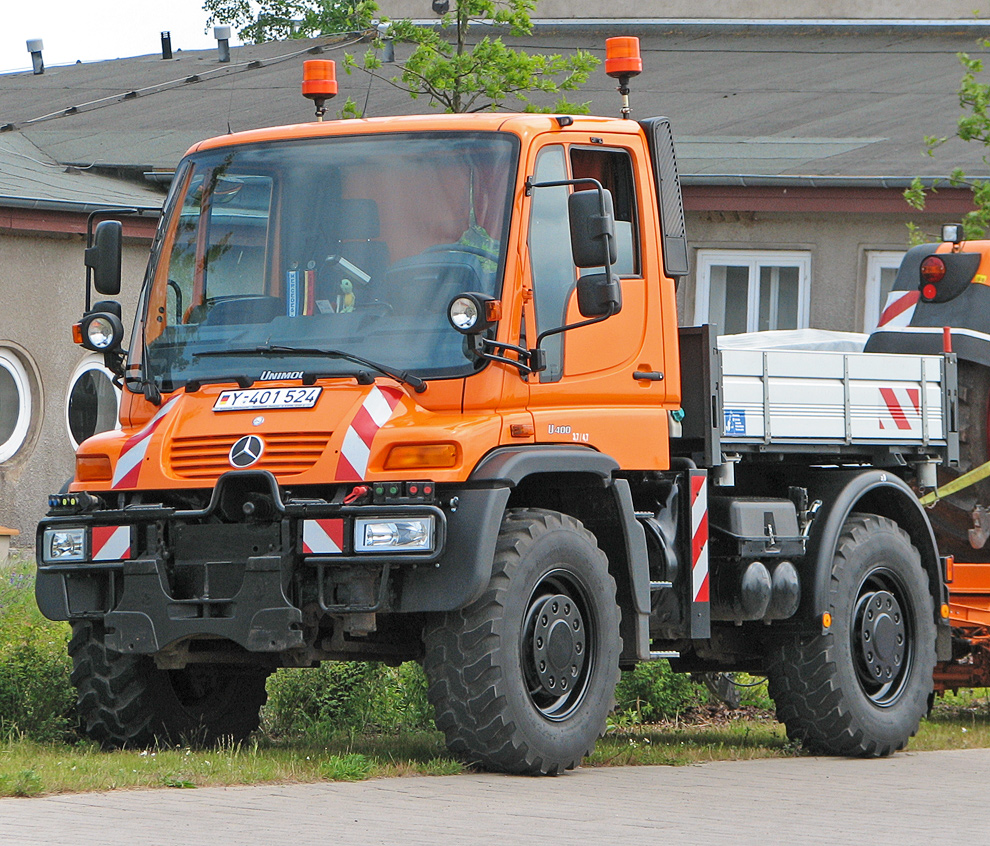
Unimog U400

- Unimog, managed by Daimler since 1951
- MTU Friedrichshafen, purchased by Daimler in 1960
- Freightliner Trucks, sub-brand of Daimler Trucks North America
- Setra, acquired from Kässbohrer in 1995
- EvoBus

== Tuners ==
- Brabus
- RaceIQ Perofrmance
- Carlsson
- Hamann Motorsport
- Kleemann
- Mansory
- Renntech
- MKB Tuning
- AMG TAI'S/GOLABWORX
- Gad motors

== See also ==
- List of Mercedes-Benz engines
