= Mercedes-Benz Ocean Drive =

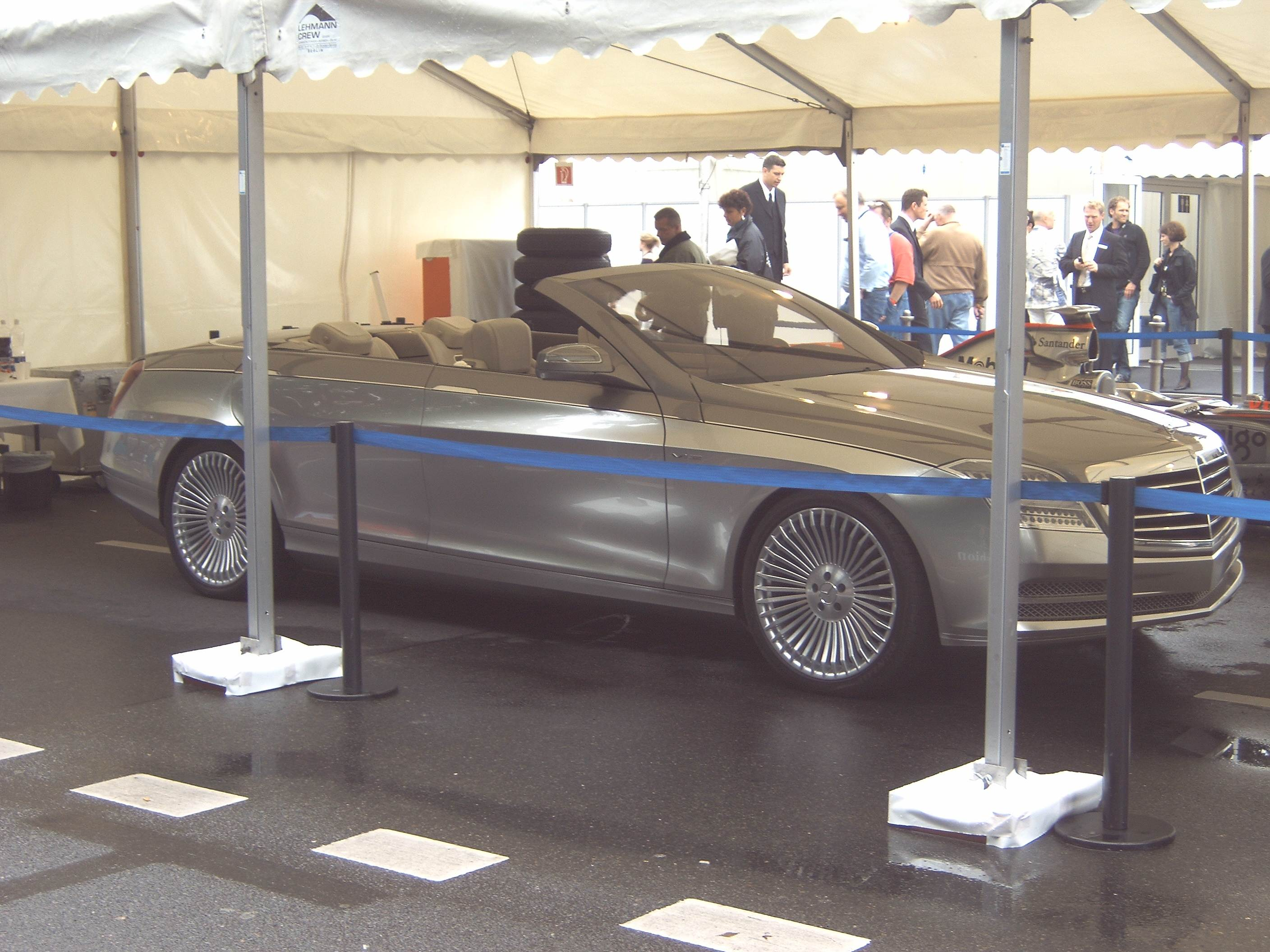

Overview
- Manufacturer: Mercedes-Benz
- Production: 2007
- Designer: Steffen Köhl

Body and chassis
- Class: Concept car
- Body style: 4-door convertible

Powertrain
- Engine: M275 twin-turbocharged V12

The Mercedes-Benz Ocean Drive is a concept car manufactured by Mercedes-Benz and was unveiled to public at the 2007 North American International Auto Show.

The Ocean Drive is built on the chassis of an S 600 long wheelbase and powered by the S 600's twin turbocharged V12 producing 517 bhp (386 kW) and 830 N⋅m (612 lb⋅ft) of torque.

The Ocean Drive features a 4-door convertible body made from carbon fiber. The soft top is made of textile, and can be opened or closed within 20 seconds. Each of the four seats has been fitted with the AIRSCARF system, also available on production Mercedes convertibles, which blows a stream of warm air out of the neckrest. The interior is finished in a mix of leather and canvas, with birds-eye maple wood trim. The exterior design for the concept came from Mercedes' Yokohama, Japan design studio, while the interior was designed at their Como, Italy studio.

== Gallery ==
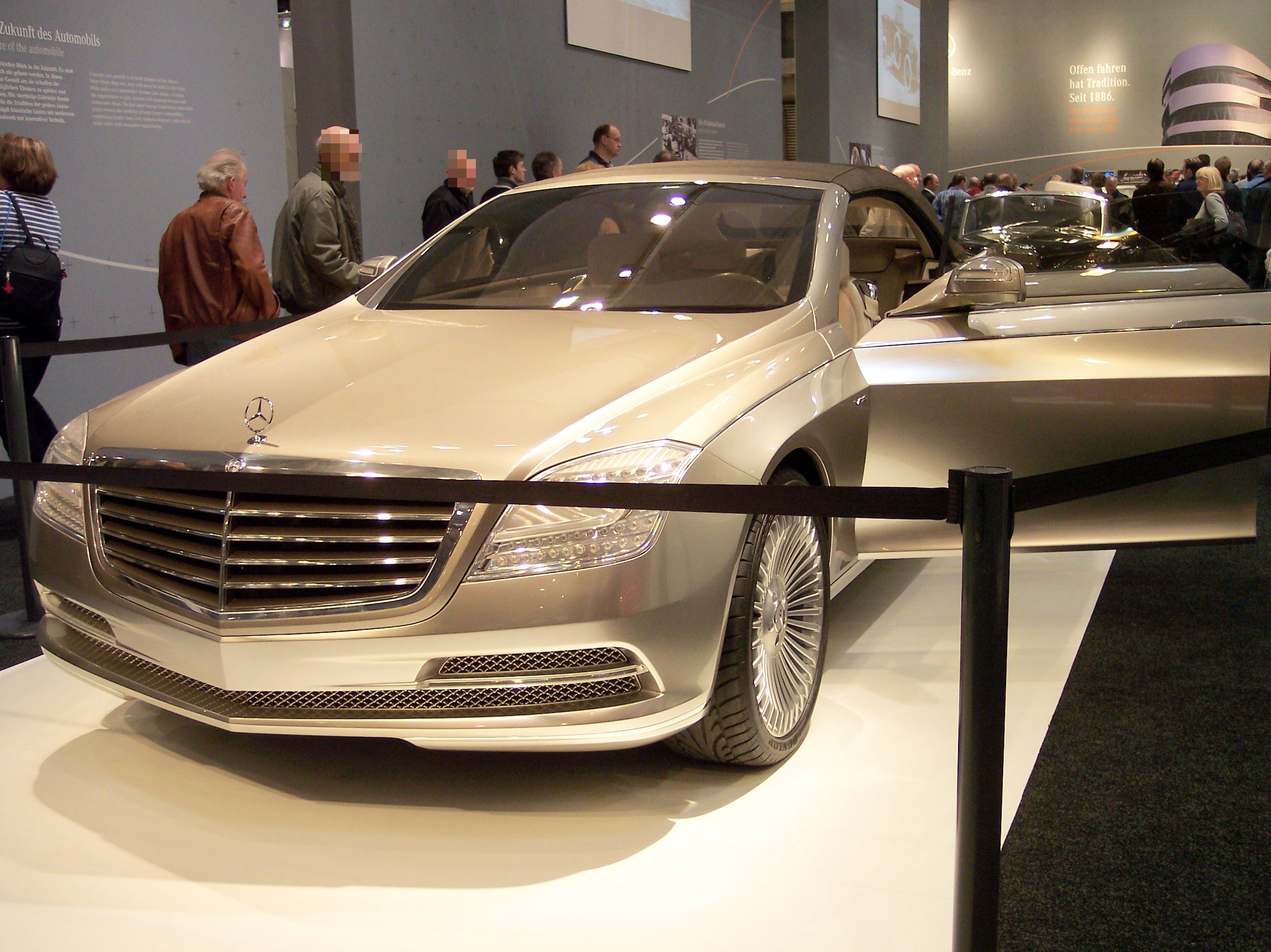
Front view with doors open

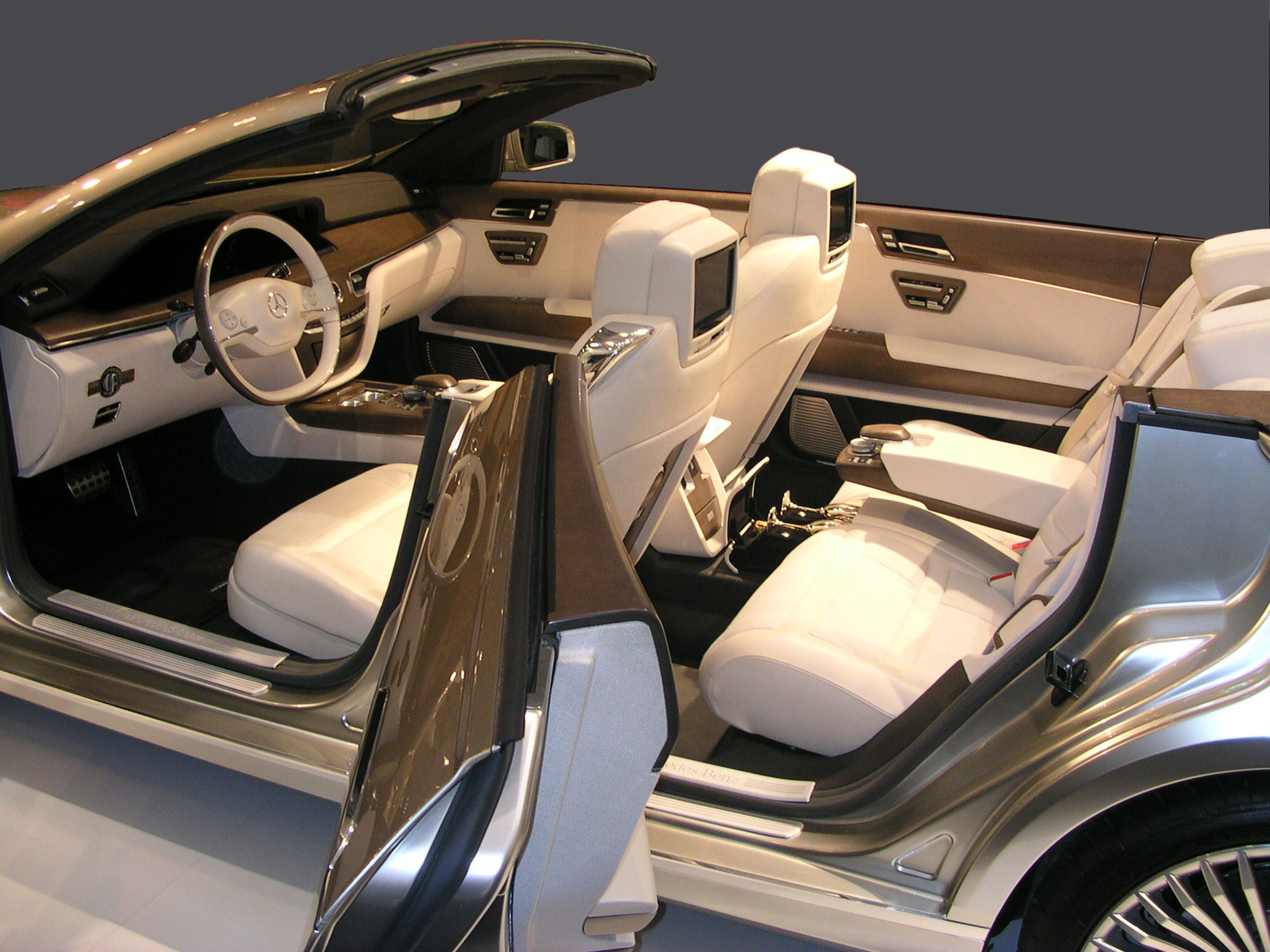
Ocean Drive interior

== See also ==
- List of Mercedes-Benz vehicles
