= Mercedes-Benz VLE =

Battery electric full-size luxury minivan

Overview
- Manufacturer: Mercedes-Benz Group
- Also called: Mercedes-Benz VLS
- Production: June 2026 – present
- Model years: 2027
- Assembly: Spain: Vitoria-Gasteiz; China: Fuzhou (Fujian Benz)
- Designer: Gorden Wagener (head of design)

Body and chassis
- Class: Full-size luxury minivan (M)
- Body style: 5-door minivan
- Layout: Front-motor, front-wheel-drive (VLE 300); Dual-motor, four-wheel-drive (VLE 400 4MATIC)
- Platform: VAN.EA

Dimensions
- Wheelbase: 3,342 mm (131.6 in) (SWB); 3,517 mm (138.5 in) (LWB)
- Length: 5,309 mm (209.0 in) (SWB); 5,484 mm (215.9 in) (LWB)
- Width: 1,999 mm (78.7 in)
- Height: 1,943 mm (76.5 in)
- Kerb weight: 3,500–3,700 kg (7,716–8,157 lb)

Chronology
- Predecessor: Mercedes-Benz EQV (for VLE); Mercedes-Benz R-Class (for VLS)

The Mercedes-Benz VLE is a battery electric full-size luxury minivan manufactured by Mercedes-Benz. It was previewed as the Mercedes-Benz Vision V in April 2025 and has been repeatedly teased afterwards. A more luxurious and longer version will be sold as the VLS.

== Overview ==
The VLE is the first product of a new generation of Mercedes-Benz passenger vans, based on the scalable VAN.EA platform. According to Mercedes-Benz, it will offer up to 8 seats. On 17 December 2025, Mercedes-Benz confirmed the production model would be unveiled on 10 March 2026.

The VLE was previewed by the Vision V concept, which was revealed on 22 April 2025.

The VLE was revealed on 10 March 2026.

Mercedes-Benz plans to introduce petrol and diesel engines for the VLE later on in its life cycle.

Rear view

Interior

=== Exterior ===
In front, the Vision V features a light bar, a new illuminated three-pointed-star hood ornament and an illuminated chrome grille. Notably, it only features one rear (sliding) door on the passenger slide. It also features 24-inch chrome wheels, and a single wraparound taillight unit.

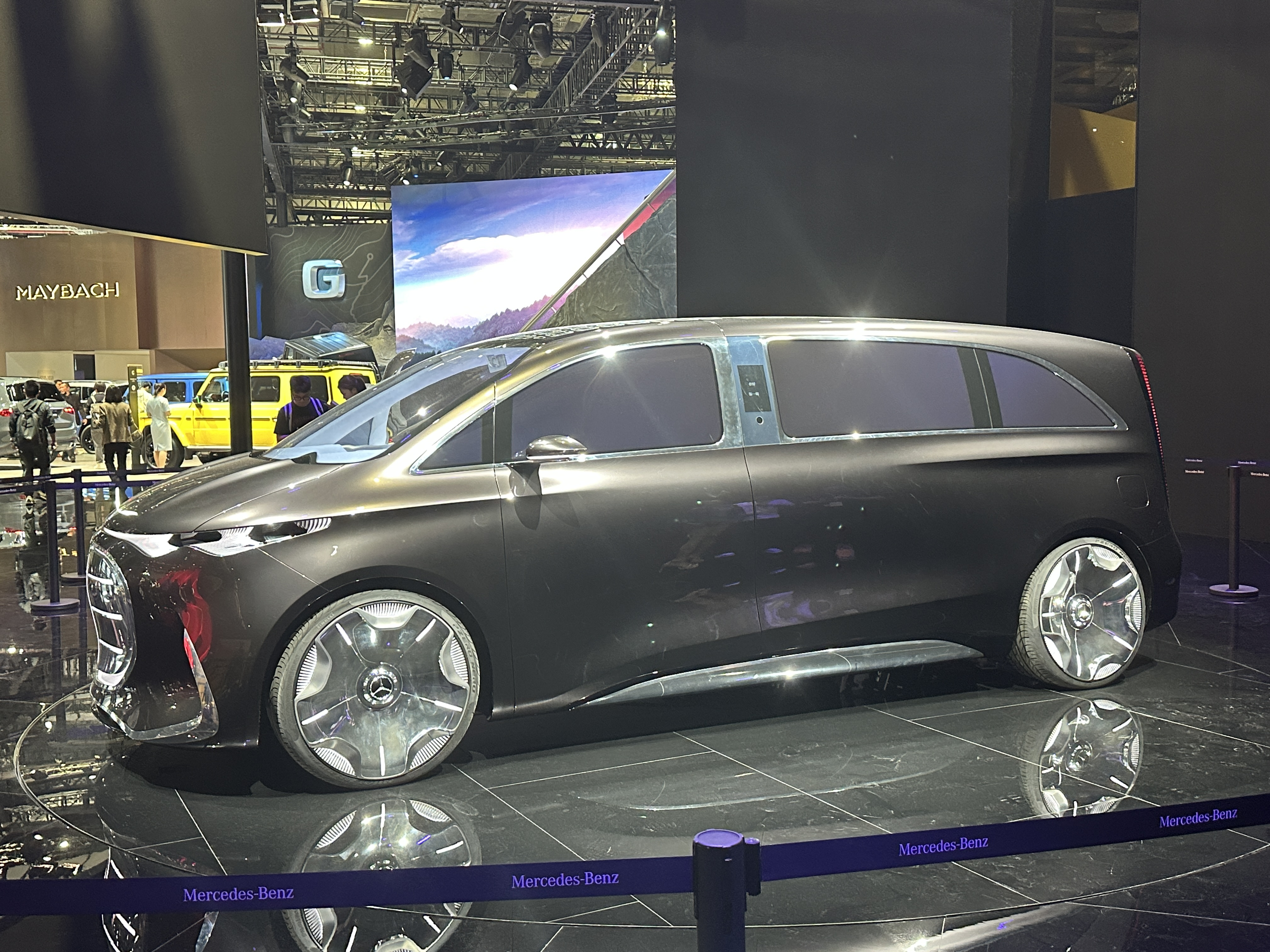
Mercedes-Benz Vision V

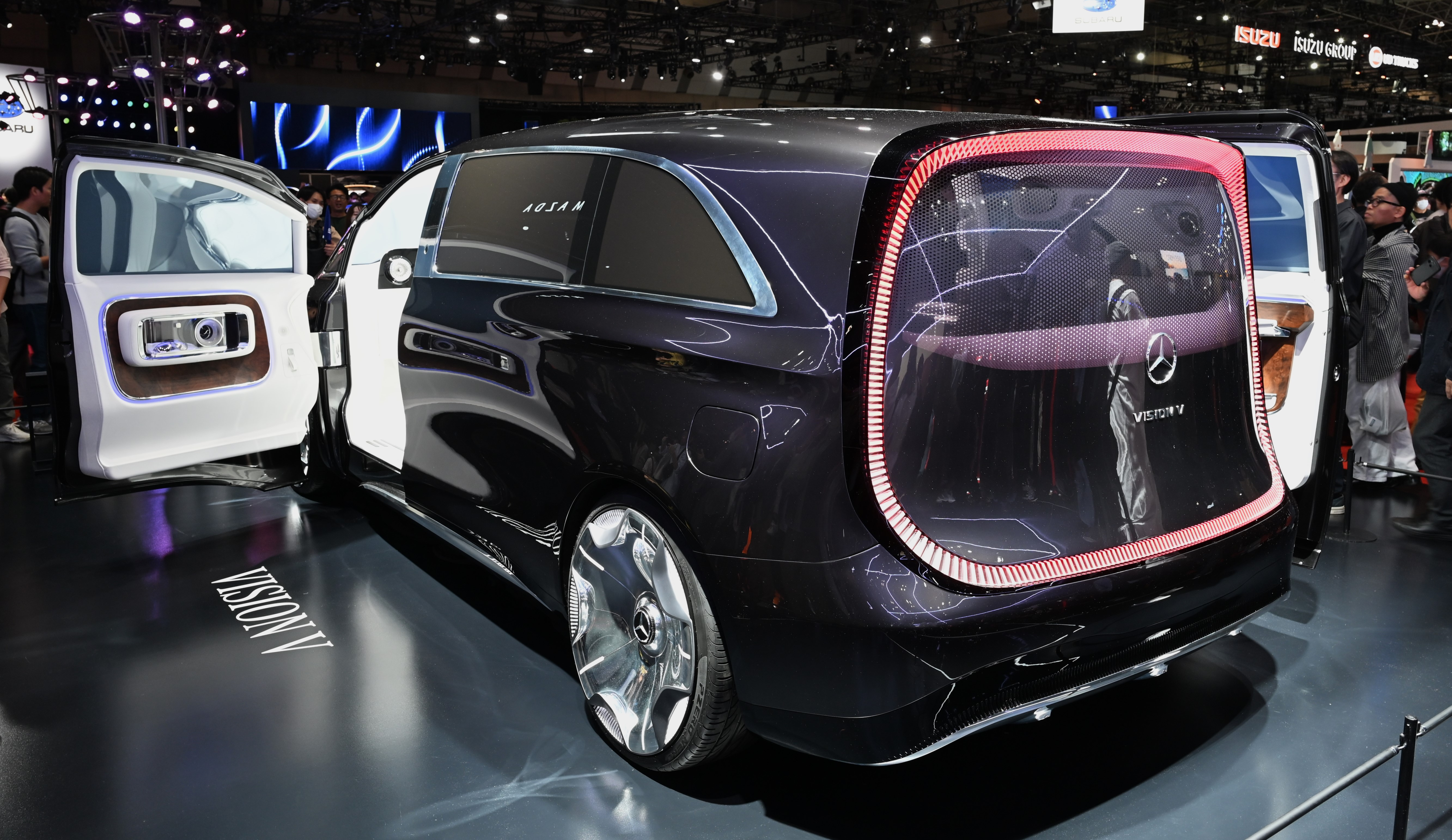
Rear view

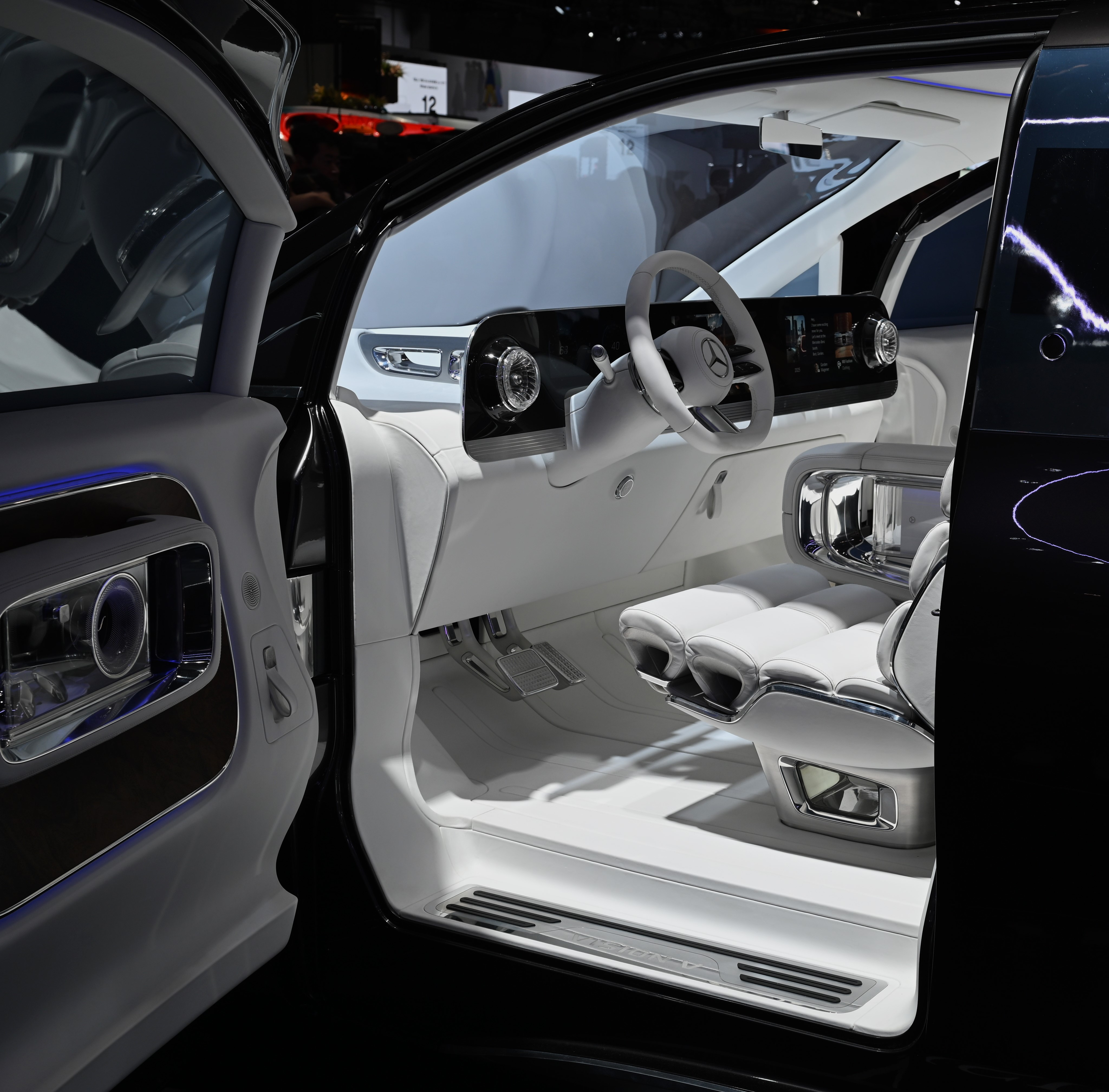
Interior

=== Interior & Features ===
The interior features white nappa leather and silk, wood trim with glass cabinets and trim pieces, polished aluminum accents and a 42-speaker Dolby Atmos surround sound system. Ambient lighting and a ceiling lamp are paired with a fragrance diffuser. Other features include adaptive seats that can form beds, a glass chess set within the center console, a flexible roll-up 65-inch 4K display, an electrochromic glass partition separating the front and rear cabin, electrochromic windows and glass floor elements which can combine with the 65-inch display to form a 360-degree viewing experience. In terms of software, new "Digital Experiences" can let passengers select a mood such as "gaming" or "relax", adjusting vehicle settings within the rear displays and the front Superscreen accordingly.
