= Mercedes-Benz F100 =

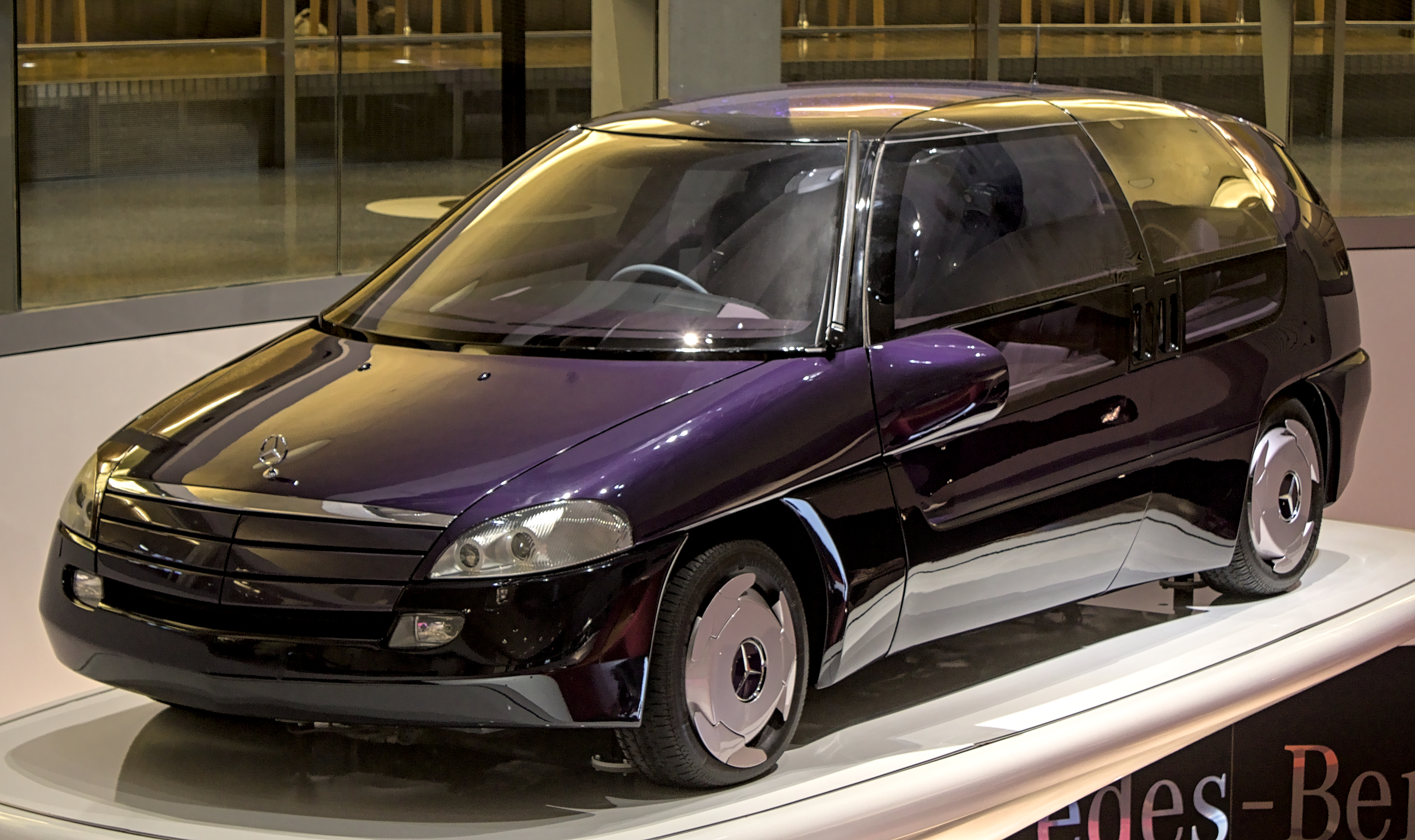

Overview
- Manufacturer: Daimler-Benz

Body and chassis
- Class: Van/concept car
- Body style: 5-door van
- Layout: FMR
- Doors: Swan (front); Sliding (rear)

Powertrain
- Engine: 2.6L M112 V6 (194 hp)
- Transmission: 3-speed automatic

The Mercedes-Benz F100 is a concept car by then Daimler-Benz unveiled at the North American International Auto Show in 1991. The goal was to show off innovations in control, design, and comfort in passenger cars.

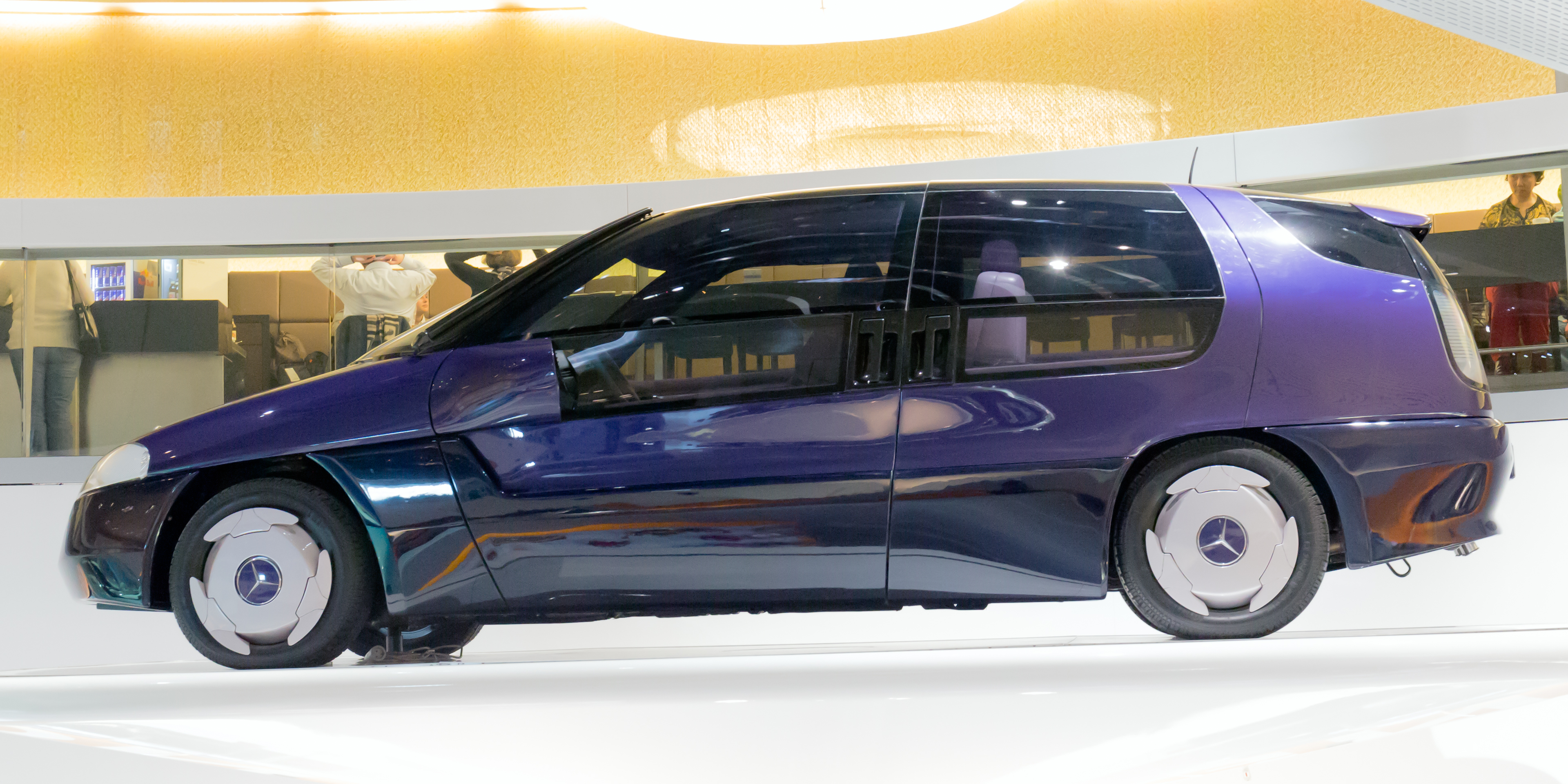
F100 side view

== Introduced technologies ==
The F100 introduced a number of features that later appeared in production Mercedes models. The year of series debut of these features on production Mercedes models is in parentheses:

- Autonomous cruise control system (1999 Distronic)
- Active Blind Spot Assist and Active Lane Keeping Assist (2010)
- Solar cell roof (2002 Maybach 62)
- Low beam HID Xenon headlamps (1995)
- Voice recognition (1996)
- Tire-pressure monitoring system (1999)
- Rain sensor (1995)
- Chip card instead of car keys (1998 Keyless Go)
- Collision avoidance system (2005 radar Distronic Plus with BAS Plus)
