= Mercedes-Benz AMG Vision Gran Turismo =

Concept car produced by Mercedes-Benz

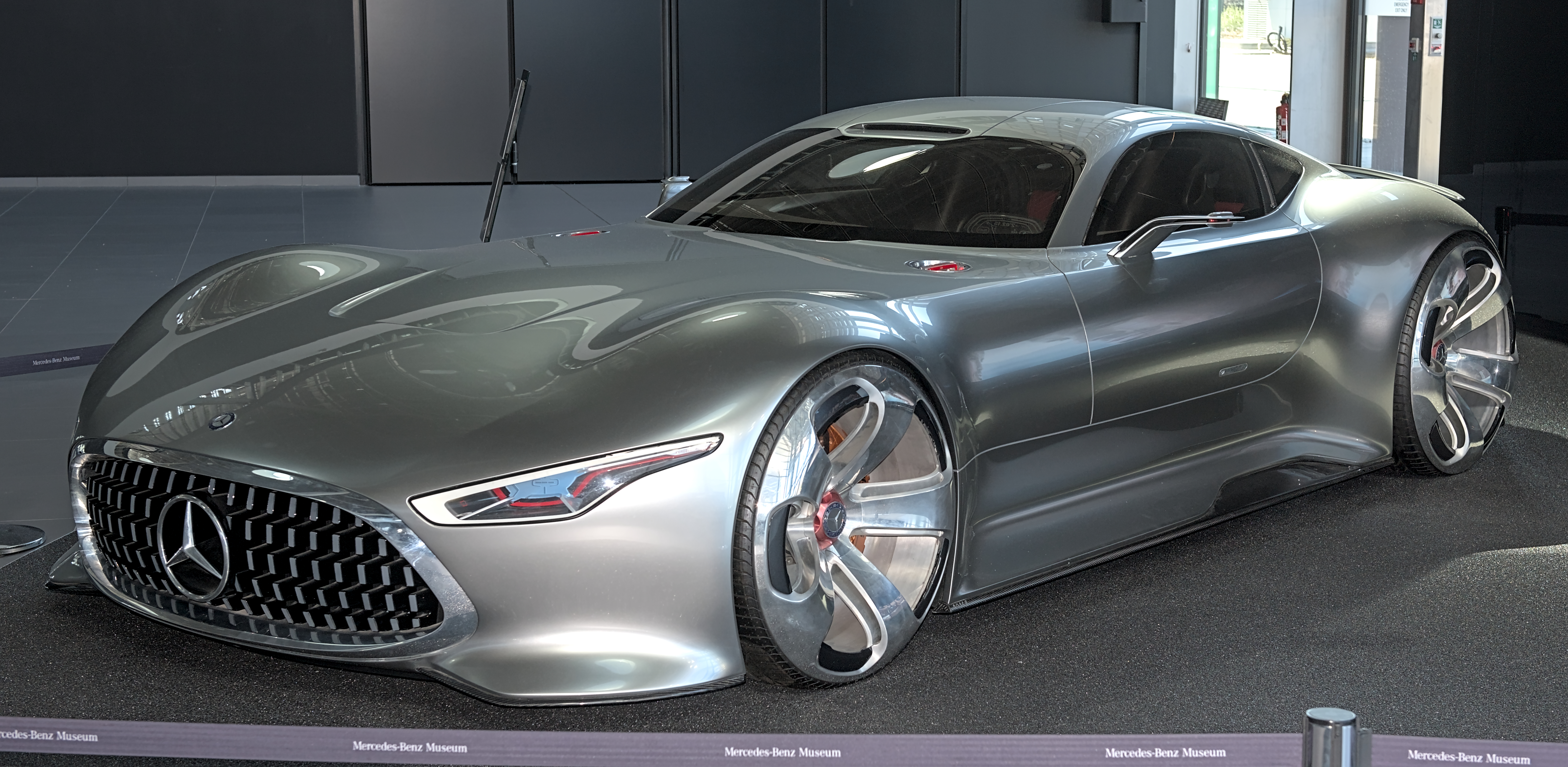

Overview
- Manufacturer: Mercedes-Benz
- Production: 2013

Body and chassis
- Class: Sports car
- Body style: 2-door coupé
- Layout: FR layout

Powertrain
- Engine: 5.5 L M157 AMG V8; 6.2 L M159 DOHC V8 (Racing Series)

Dimensions
- Curb weight: 1,604 kg (3,536 lb)

The Mercedes-Benz AMG Vision Gran Turismo is a concept car produced by Mercedes-Benz and the Mercedes-AMG division. It was developed as a concept car in a video game but later built as a real-life model. Officially, Daimler AG did not announce the launch of the concept car in a series, but later the American company J&S Worldwide Holdings announced the production of 5 such cars. The world premiere of the concept model took place at the 2013 LA Auto Show in Los Angeles, California. Many design decisions subsequently formed the basis of the Mercedes-AMG GT.

== History ==
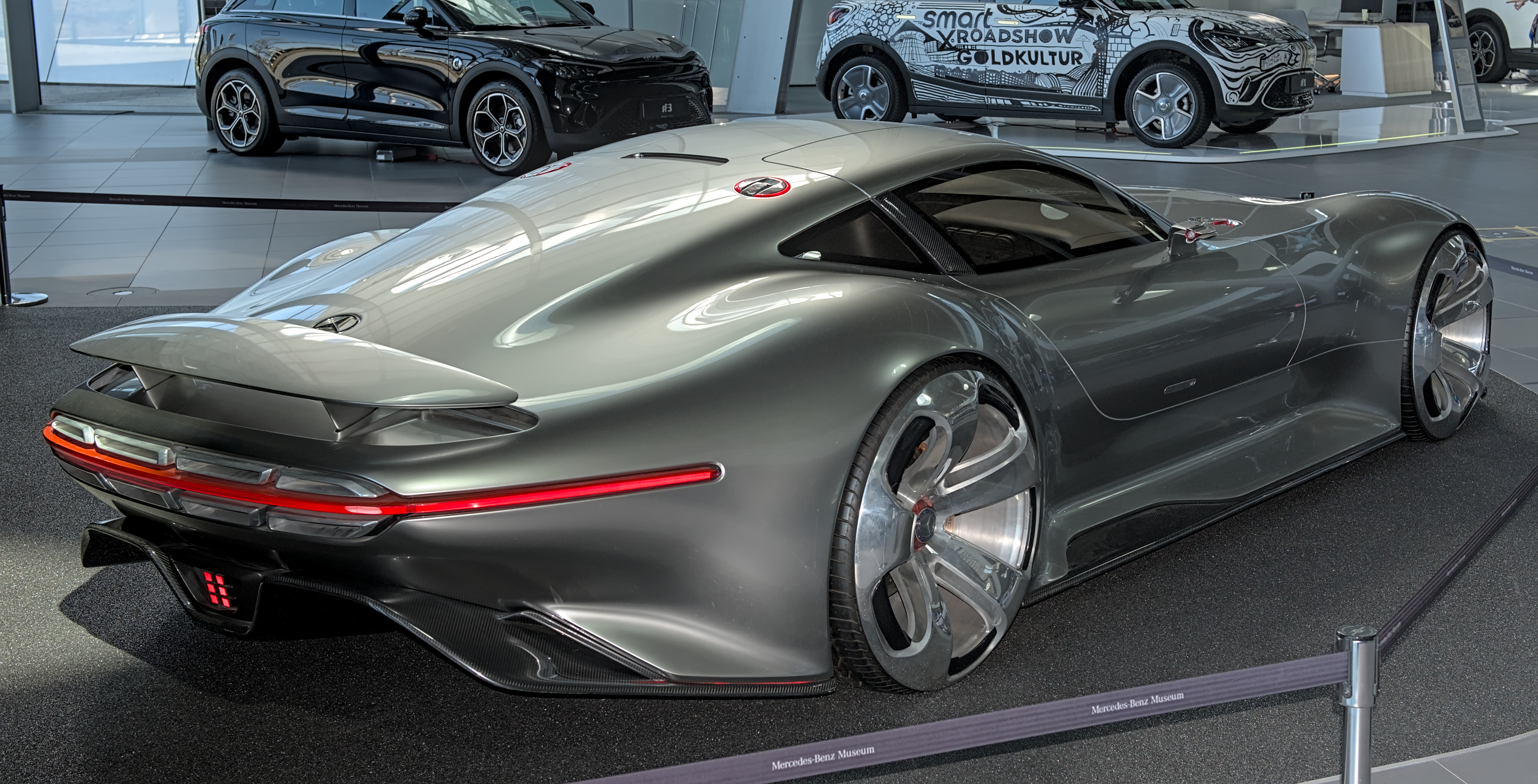
Rear view of the AMG Vision Gran Turismo

Initially, the AMG Vision Gran Turismo was developed exclusively as one of the sports car models for the game Gran Turismo 6. The ultra-futuristic design of the model was inspired by cars such as Mercedes-Benz SLS AMG, Formula One cars, Batmobile, Mercedes-Benz 300 SL, 1930s racing models and various car versions from Mercedes-AMG.

The AMG Vision Gran Turismo is the first Vision Gran Turismo car. Making design a reality has been entrusted to Mercedes-Benz design studios around the world. The final versions were approved in Sindelfingen and Karlsbad as part of the digital design process, and then improved on physical modeling on a 1:1 scale. The interior of the car was dealt with by a studio from Como, Italy. The car frame was made of aluminum pipes, the body was made of carbon fiber, and a removable spoiler was installed at the back. As a power unit, it offers a twin-turbocharged 5.5-litre M157 AMG V8 engine with an output of 430 kW (580 hp). The mass of the car was 1,385 kg (3,053 lb). The producer of the Gran Turismo series Kazunori Yamauchi attended the car presentation ceremony, celebrating the birth of the car along with its creators.

In 2013, the American luxury goods manufacturer J&S Worldwide Holdings announced its desire to launch a small series of Mercedes-Benz AMG Vision Gran Turismo cars. Two copies were intended for Europe and the Middle East, and one for the United States. In total, according to automotive media, 5 AMG Vision Gran Turismo cars were produced. According to the Fox News report, Mercedes-Benz is very strict about replicating its own cars and using its brand, especially for profit. This fact became especially noticeable when the German automaker destroyed a replica of the Mercedes-Benz 300 SL in 2012. Therefore, there is no exact information about the existence of model replicas.

== Racing Series ==
Mercedes-Benz AMG Vision Gran Turismo Racing Series

In this model, the original version of the movable rear wing was changed to a fixed type, and the CCD camera type door mirror was changed to a conventional mirror. The rear brake light has been modified so that the Gran Turismo logo is visible when lit. The engine was powered up to 441 kW (591 hp). The 7-speed dual-clutch transmission has been replaced with a sequential transmission using doglinks to increase transmission efficiency. The body has been reduced in weight to 1,300 kg (2,900 lb), and the height has been lowered to lower the center of gravity.

== Media ==
The AMG Vision Gran Turismo is featured in the Polyphony Digital games Gran Turismo 6, Gran Turismo Sport and Gran Turismo 7, with Sport having an LH Edition, created for the "maestro" of the Gran Turismo series, Lewis Hamilton, rewarded for getting Diamond on all courses in his Time Trial Challenge DLC pack. The car is also seen in the movie Justice League as the car Bruce Wayne picks up Barry Allen in when he recruits Barry to the team.
