= Mercedes-Benz W113 =

Car model

Mercedes-Benz W113 230 SL, 250 SL, 280 SL
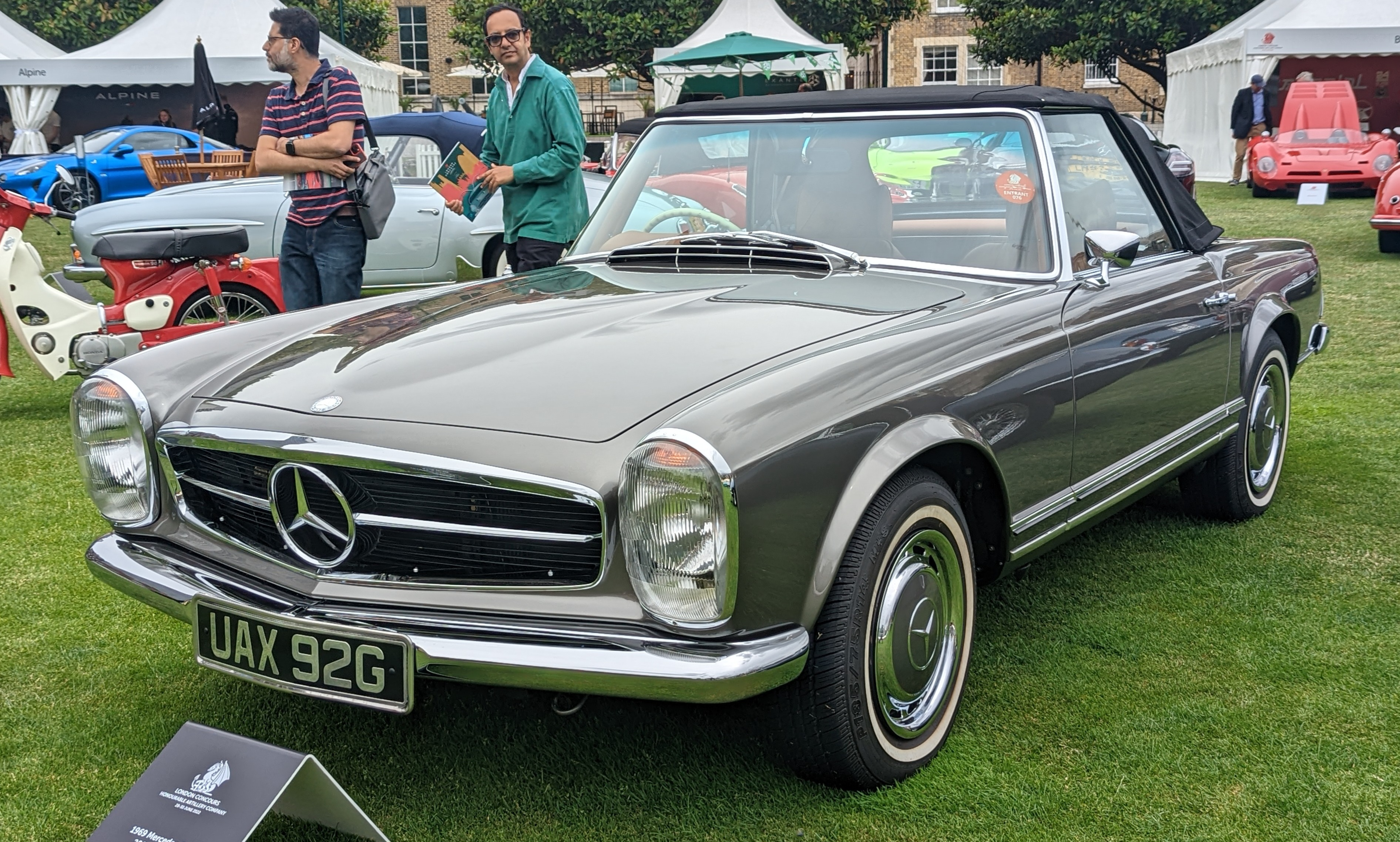

Overview
- Manufacturer: Daimler-Benz
- Production: 1963–1971; 48,912 built
- Assembly: West Germany: Stuttgart; Sindelfingen
- Designer: Friedrich Geiger; Béla Barényi; Paul Bracq

Body and chassis
- Class: Sports car / Grand tourer
- Body style: 2-door coupé 2-door roadster
- Layout: Longitudinal FR layout
- Platform: Mercedes-Benz W111
- Related: Mercedes-Benz W108/W109; Mercedes-Benz W112; Mercedes-Benz W114/W115

Powertrain
- Engine: 2.3 L (2,308 cc) M127.II I6; 2.5 L (2,496 cc) M129.II I6; 2.8 L (2,778 cc) M130 I6
- Transmission: 4-speed automatic 4-speed manual 5-speed ZF S5-20 manual

Dimensions
- Wheelbase: 2,400 mm (94.5 in)
- Length: 4,335 mm (170.7 in)
- Width: 1,760 mm (69.3 in)
- Height: 1,305 mm (51.4 in)
- Curb weight: 1,300 kg (2,866 lb)

Chronology
- Predecessor: Mercedes-Benz W198; Mercedes-Benz W121 BII
- Successor: Mercedes-Benz R107

See Mercedes-Benz SL-Class for a complete overview of all SL-Class models.

The Mercedes-Benz W 113 is a two-seat luxury roadster/coupé, introduced at the 1963 Geneva Motor Show and produced from 1963 through 1971. It replaced both the 300 SL (W 198) and the 190 SL (W 121 BII). Of the 48,912 W 113 SLs produced, 19,440 were sold in the US. The W 113 was marketed under the names Mercedes-Benz 230 SL, 250 SL and 280 SL.

The W 113 was developed under the auspices of Mercedes-Benz Technical Director Fritz Nallinger, Chief Engineer Rudolf Uhlenhaut and Head of Styling Friedrich Geiger, who had previously designed the iconic 500K/540K and 300 SL. The lead designers were Paul Bracq and Béla Barényi, who created its patented, slightly concave hardtop, which inspired the "Pagoda" nickname.

All models were equipped with a fuel injected inline-six engine. The bonnet, boot lid, door skins and tonneau cover were made of aluminium to reduce weight. The comparatively short and wide chassis, combined with an excellent suspension, powerful brakes and radial tires gave the W 113 superb handling for its time. The styling of the front, with its characteristic upright Bosch "fishbowl" headlights and simple chrome grille, dominated by the large three-pointed star in the nose panel, paid homage to the 300 SL roadster.

W 113 SLs were typically configured as a "Coupé/Roadster" with a soft-top and an optional removable hardtop. A 2+2 was introduced with the 250 SL "California Coupé", which had a fold-down rear bench seat instead of the soft-top.

== History ==
By 1955, Mercedes-Benz Technical Director Prof. Fritz Nallinger and his team held no illusions regarding the 190 SL's lack of performance, while the high price tag of the legendary 300 SL supercar kept it elusive for all but the most affluent buyers. Thus, Mercedes-Benz started evolving the 190 SL on a new platform, model code W 127, with a fuel-injected 2.2 liter M127 straight-six engine, internally denoted as 220 SL. Encouraged by positive test results, Nallinger proposed that the 220 SL be placed in the Mercedes-Benz program, with production commencing in July 1957.

However, while technical difficulties kept postponing the production start of the W 127, the emerging new S-Class W 112 platform introduced novel body manufacturing technology altogether. So in 1960, Nallinger eventually proposed to develop a completely new 220 SL design, based on the "fintail" W 111 sedan platform with its chassis shortened by 30 cm (11.8 in), and technology from the W 112. This led to the W 113 platform, with an improved fuel-injected 2.3 liter M127 inline-six engine and the distinctive "pagoda" hardtop roof, designated as 230 SL.

The 230 SL made its debut at the Geneva Motor Show in March 1963, where Nallinger introduced it as follows: "It was our aim to create a very safe and fast sports car with high performance, which despite its sports characteristics, provides a very high degree of traveling comfort".

== Safety legacy ==
The W 113 was the first sports car with a "safety body", based on Barényi's extensive work on vehicle safety. It inherited a rigid passenger cell and designated crumple zones with impact-absorbing front and rear sections built into the vehicle structure from the W 111 it is based on. The W 113 was also the first Mercedes-Benz with radial tires.

The interior was "rounded", with all hard corners and edges removed, just like in the W 111 sedan. The steering gear was pulled back from the crash sensitive front of the engine compartment towards the fire wall, and the steering column was angled with universal joints to protect the driver from impalement in a frontal impact. The mid-life model refresh in fall 1967 further improved driver protection with a collapsable telescopic steering column and padded steering wheel hub to better absorb kinetic energy during a crash, also safety innovations from Barényi.

== Models ==
=== 230 SL (1963–1967) ===
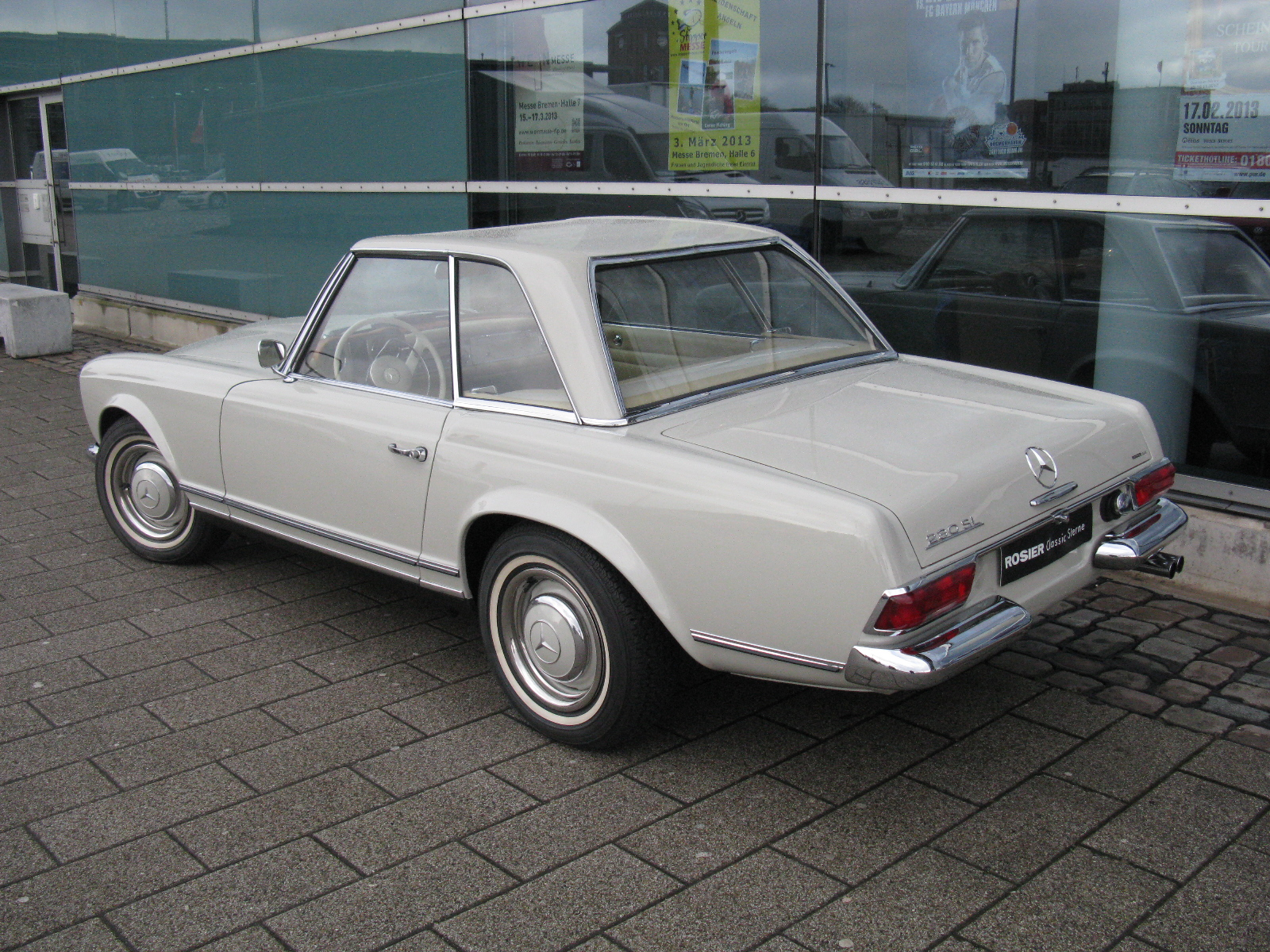
Mercedes-Benz 230 SL

Production of the 230 SL commenced in June 1963 and ended on 5 January 1967. Its chassis was based on the W 111 sedan platform, with a reduced wheelbase by 30 cm (11.8 in), recirculating ball steering (with optional power steering), double wishbone front suspension and an independent single-joint, low-pivot swing rear-axle with transverse compensator spring. The dual-circuit brake system had front disc brakes and power-assisted rear drum brakes. The 230 SL was offered with a 4-speed manual transmission, or an optional, very responsive fluid coupled (no torque converter) 4-speed Mercedes-Benz automatic transmission, which was popular for US models. From May 1966, the ZF S5-20 5-speed manual transmission was available as an additional option, which was particularly popular in Italy. Of the 19,831 230 SLs produced, less than a quarter were sold in the US.

The 2,308 cc (2.3 L) M127.II inline-six engine with 150 PS (110 kW; 148 hp) and 196 N⋅m (145 lb⋅ft) torque was based on Mercedes-Benz' venerable M180 inline-six with four main bearings and mechanical Bosch multi-port fuel injection. Mercedes-Benz made a number of modifications to boost its power, including increasing displacement from 2,197 cc (2.2 L), and using a completely new cylinder head with a higher compression ratio (9.3 vs. 8.7), enlarged valves and a modified camshaft. A fuel injection pump with six plungers instead of two was fitted, which allowed placing the nozzles in the cylinder head and "shooting" the fuel through the intake manifold and open valves directly into the combustion chambers. An optional oil-water heat exchanger was also available.

Mercedes-Benz Chief Engineer Rudolf Uhlenhaut demonstrated the capabilities of the 230 SL on the tight three-quarter mile Annemasse Vétraz-Monthoux race track in 1963, where he put up a best lap time of 47.5 seconds vs. 47.3 seconds by Grand Prix driver Mike Parkes on his 3-liter V12 Ferrari 250 GT.

A brief chronology of the most notable changes made to the 230 SL:

- 10/1963: First 230 SL with automatic transmission.
- 09/1964: Spare tire well removed, tire mounted horizontally.
- 11/1964: Optional tinted/thermal glass and new soft-top with steel bows (distinguished by missing chrome trim on the outer trailing edge).
- 04/1964: US models with radio Becker Europa TR instead of Europa TG.
- 08/1965: Some harmonization with new W 108/W 109 sedans, incl. new floor panels, combined brake and clutch fluid reservoir, boot light and interior changes. US models with hazard lights.
- 03/1966: Mounts for three-point seat belts added.
- 05/1966: Optional ZF 5-speed manual transmission; rare and now very desirable.

=== 250 SL (1966–1968) ===
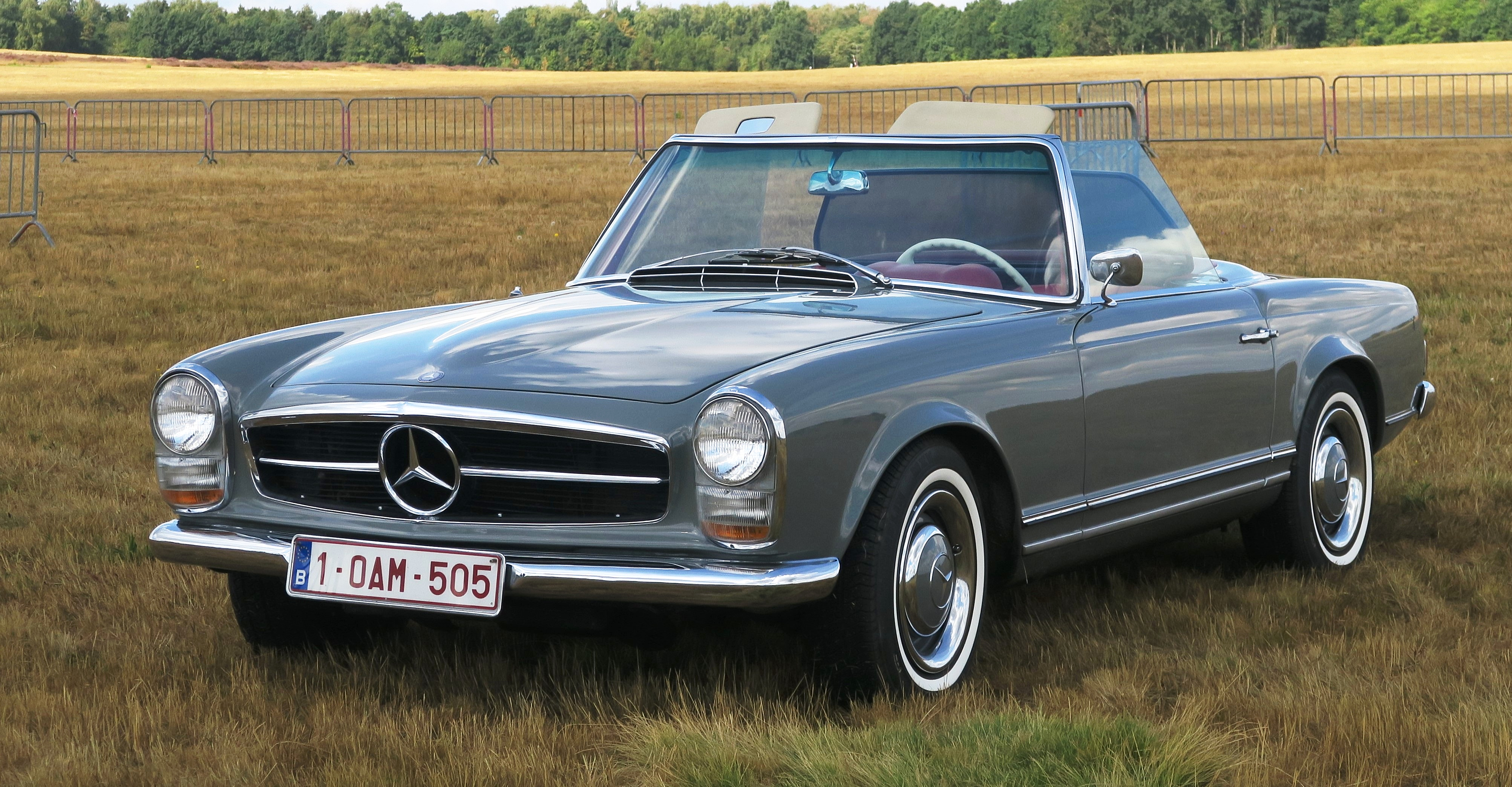
1967 Mercedes-Benz 250 SL, European spec.

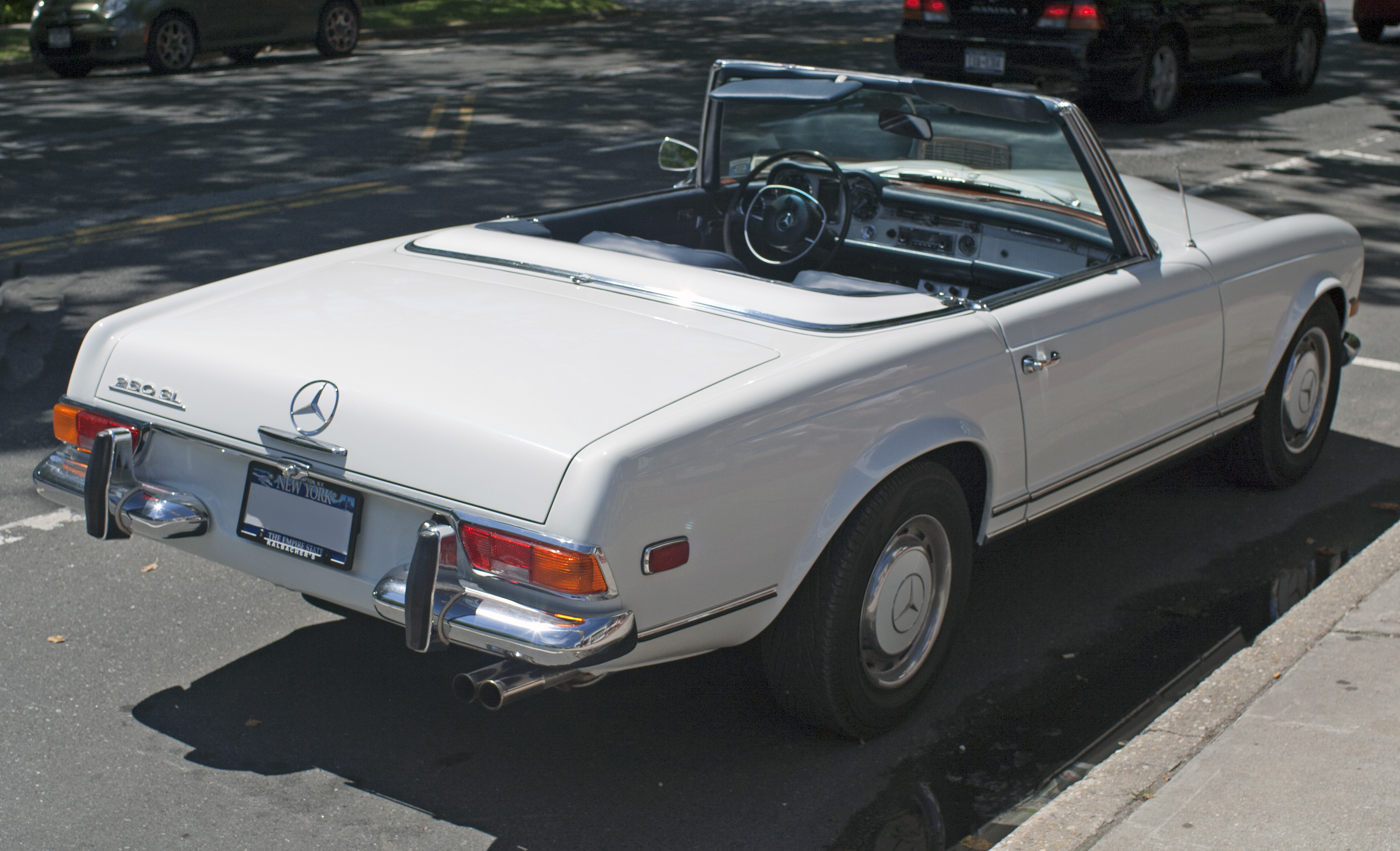
1967 Mercedes-Benz 250 SL, late US model

The 250 SL was introduced at the 1967 Geneva Motor Show. Production had already commenced in December 1966 and ended in January 1968. The short one-year production run makes the 250 SL the rarest of the W 113 series cars. The 250 SL retained the stiffer suspension and sportier feel of the early SLs, but provided improved agility with a new engine and rear disc brakes. Range also improved with increased fuel tank capacity from 65 L (17.2 US gal) to 82 L (21.7 US gal). Like its predecessor, the 250 SL was offered with a 4-speed automatic transmission, and 4-speed or ZF 5-speed manual transmissions. For the first time, an optional limited slip differential was also available. Of the 5,196 250 SLs produced, more than a third were sold in the US.

The main change was the use of the 2,496 cc (2.5 L) M129.II engine with 6 mm (0.2 in) increased stroke, 2 mm (0.1 in) increased valve ports, and seven main bearings instead of four. The nominal maximum power remained unchanged at 150 PS (110 kW; 148 hp), but torque improved from 145 lb⋅ft (197 N⋅m) to 159 lb⋅ft (216 N⋅m). Resiliency also improved with a new cooling water tank ("round top") with increased capacity from 10.8 L (2.9 US gal) to 12.9 L (3.4 US gal), and a standard oil-water heat exchanger.

The wider power band of the 250 SL resulted in noticeably improved performance, as the 230 SL engines rarely produced more than 143 PS (105 kW; 141 hp) in practice.

==== California Coupé ====
The 250 SL also marked the introduction of a 2+2 body style in 1967, the so-called "California Coupé", which had only the removable hardtop and no soft-top: a small fold-down rear bench seat replaced the soft-top well between passenger compartment and boot. A 280 SL California version was introduced in 1968.

==== Midlife improvements ====
In August 1967, a number of additional changes were incorporated to accommodate stricter safety regulations and US emission laws. The safety improvements included a collapsible steering wheel and padded wheel hub, concave control knobs, elastic black rubber heater levers (instead of rigid coloured translucent plastic), and softer, rounded dash top padding. Door handles, locks, and window cranks were modernized and less protruding, the door pockets were elastic, the rear-view mirror frame was black plastic instead of chrome, and the side view mirrors became more angular. Essentially, the 1967 250 SL retained the more classic "chrome" interior of the 230 SL, whereas the 1968 250 SL introduced the modernized "safety" interior of the 280 SL.

US models acquired side reflectors on the fenders, Kangol three-point seat belts, an illuminated automatic gearbox shift quadrant, and emission control equipment. The chrome horn ring was changed to matte finish.

=== 280 SL (1967–1971) ===
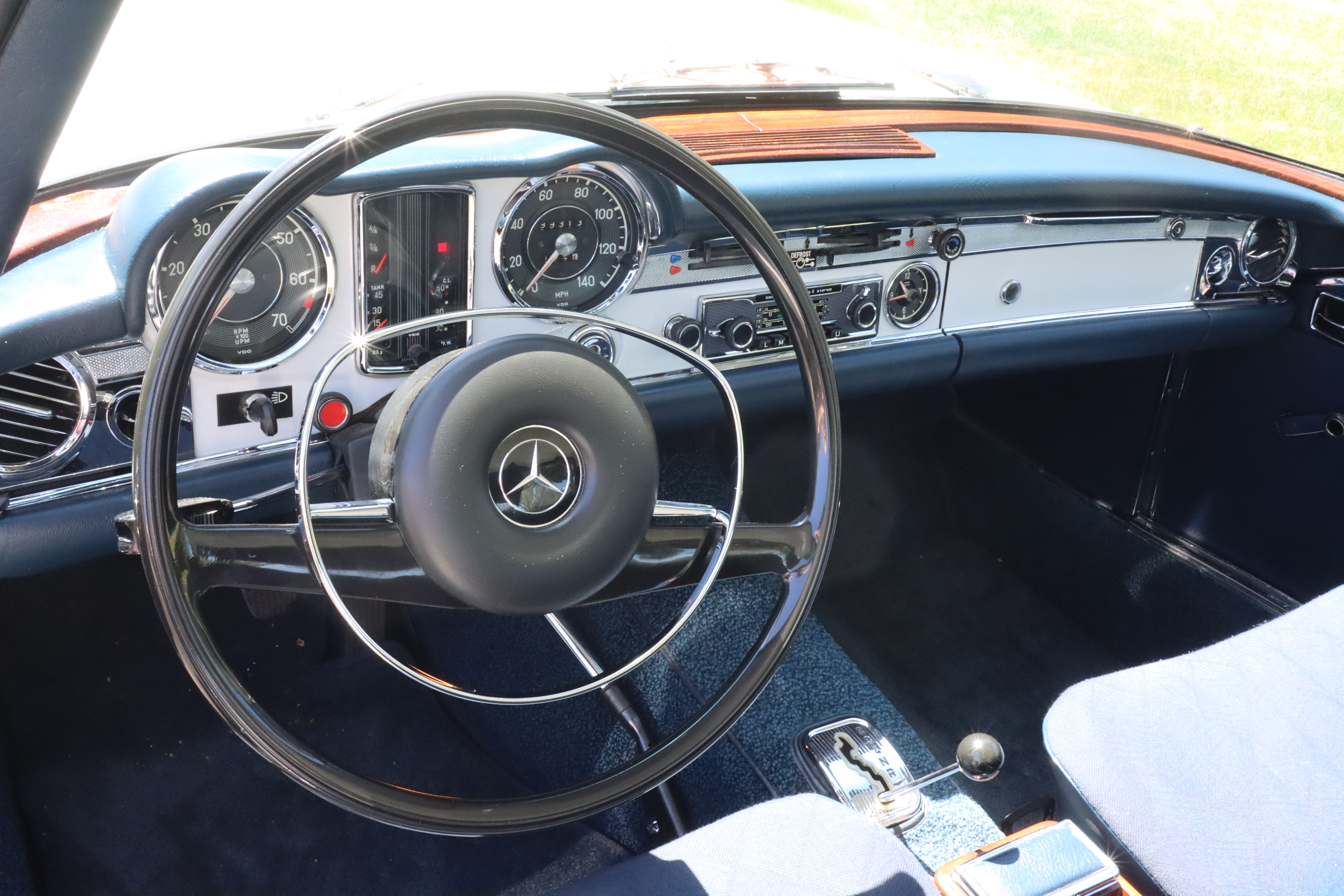
Mercedes-Benz 280 SL dashboard

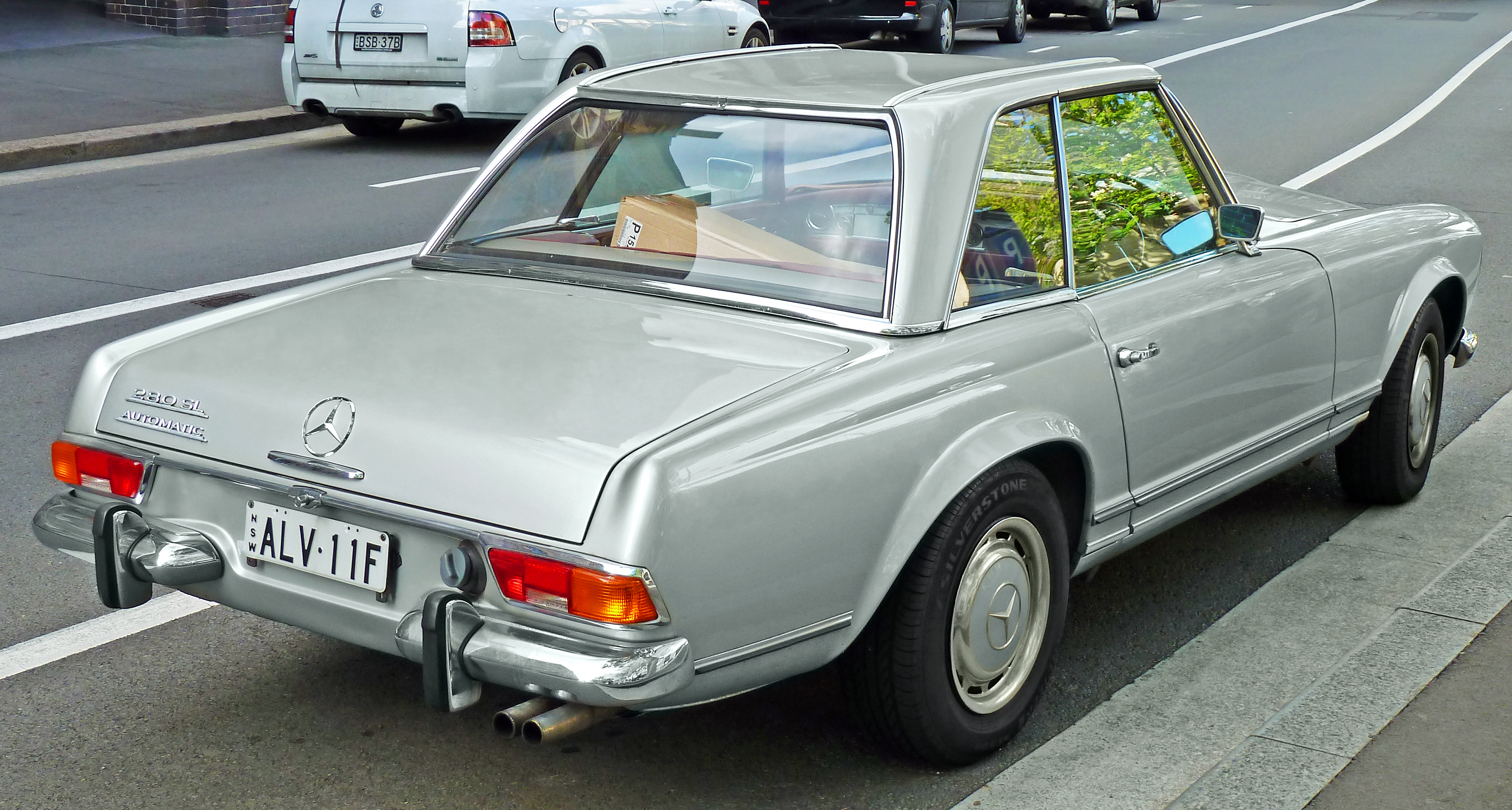
1969–1971 Mercedes-Benz 280 SL

The 280 SL was introduced in December 1967 and continued in production through 23 February 1971, when the W 113 was replaced by the entirely new and substantially heavier R107 350 SL. Over the years, the W 113 evolved from a sports car into a comfortable grand tourer, and US models were by then usually equipped with the 4-speed automatic transmission and air conditioning. Manual transmission models came with the standard 4-speed or the optional ZF 5-speed, which was ordered only 882 times and thus is a highly sought-after original option today. In Europe, manual transmissions without air conditioning were still the predominant choice. Of the 23,885 280 SLs produced, more than half were sold in the US.

The main change was an upgrade to the 2,778 cc (2.8 L) M130 engine with 170 PS (125 kW; 168 hp) maximum power and 180 lb⋅ft (244 N⋅m) maximum torque, which finally gave the W 113 adequate power. The performance improvement was achieved by increasing bore by 4.5 mm (0.2 in), which stretched the limits of the M180 block. This required ungrouping the existing pairwise cylinder casts to improve thermals with cooling water passages between all cylinders, and mandated an oil-cooler, which was fitted vertically next to the radiator. Each engine was now bench-tested for two hours prior to being fitted, so their power specification was guaranteed at last.

The M130 marked the final evolution of Mercedes-Benz' venerable SOHC M180 inline-six, before it was superseded by the new DOHC M110 inline-six introduced with R107 1974 European 280 SL models. For some time, it was also used in the W 109 300 S-Class, where it retired the expensive 3 liter M189 alloy inline-six.

A brief chronology of the most notable changes made to the 280SL:

- 12/1967: One piece wheel-covers (like W 108/W 109 sedans).
- 10/1968: US models with sealed beam headlights without fog lights.
- 02/1969: New tail lights with amber turn signals.
- 05/1969: ZF 5-speed manual transmission discontinued as listed option and available only on special request.
- 07/1969: US models with headlight assembly with full amber lower section, illuminated side markers, transistorized ignition, and improved emission control.
- 08/1969: Heated rear window for hardtop, hazard lights for all models, single master key for all locks.
- 04/1970: Bosch Lichteinheit headlights optionally with halogen main beam (distinguished by "flat" instead of "bubble" lens).
- 08/1970: Fuchs alloy wheels available as a factory-fitted option.
- 11/1970: Opaque beige plastic coolant expansion tank (instead of satin-black paint over brass). New door locks: cylinder can be depressed while door is locked.

=== North American models ===
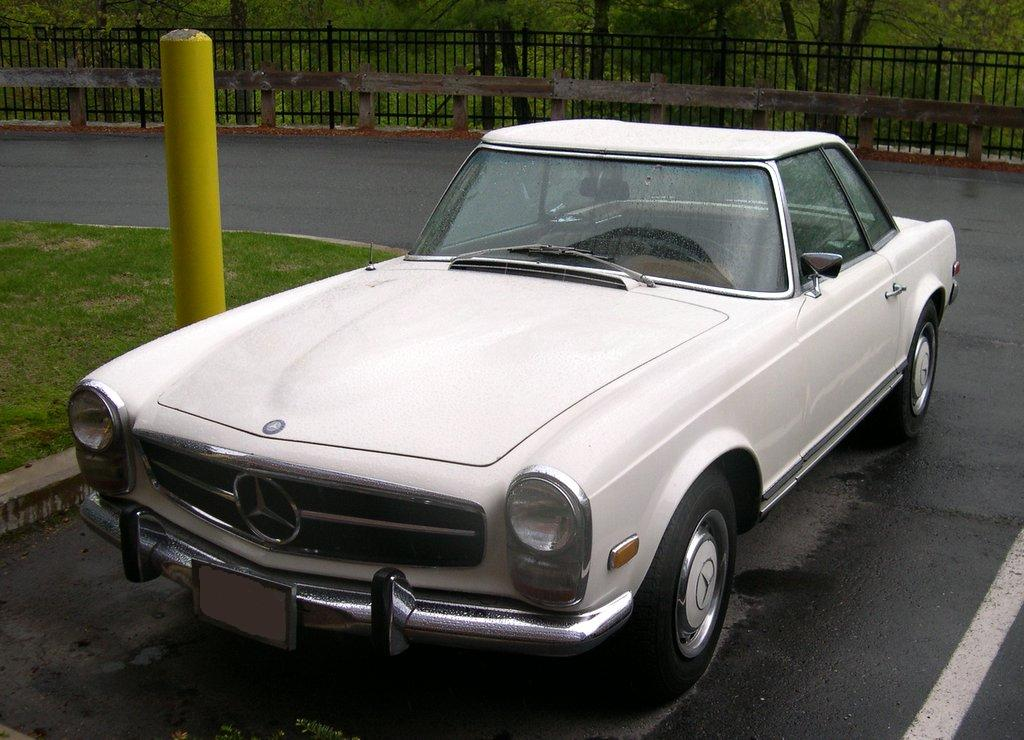
1969 Mercedes-Benz 280 SL, US model. The inward sloping greenhouse and stepped-down hardtop inspired the "pagoda" nickname.

North American models have a number of subtle differences, the most obvious one being the distinctive "sealed beam" bulb headlights required in the US versus the Bosch Lichteinheit headlights for the rest of the world. 1970 US models also acquired amber turn-signal lenses on the rear lights, later than most other countries.

Other differences of the North American models include imperial gauges, chrome bumper guards, side reflectors (illuminated from 1970), lower rear-axle ratios for faster acceleration yet reduced top speeds, and no "single-side" parking lights. US market 280 SL engines required emission control modifications, including "softer" valve timings, a reduced compression ratio and a modified injection pump, which reduced power from 170 PS (125 kW; 168 hp) to 160 PS (118 kW; 158 hp). In the US, automatic transmission, air conditioning, and white wall tires were much more popular than elsewhere.

European cars were popular US gray-market imports: those vehicles were brought to the US some years after their original delivery in Europe. Early European imports had aftermarket hazard lights and Kangol seat belts fitted, US safety requirements that were adopted in Europe only in later production years.

=== Special versions ===
==== Pininfarina Coupé ====
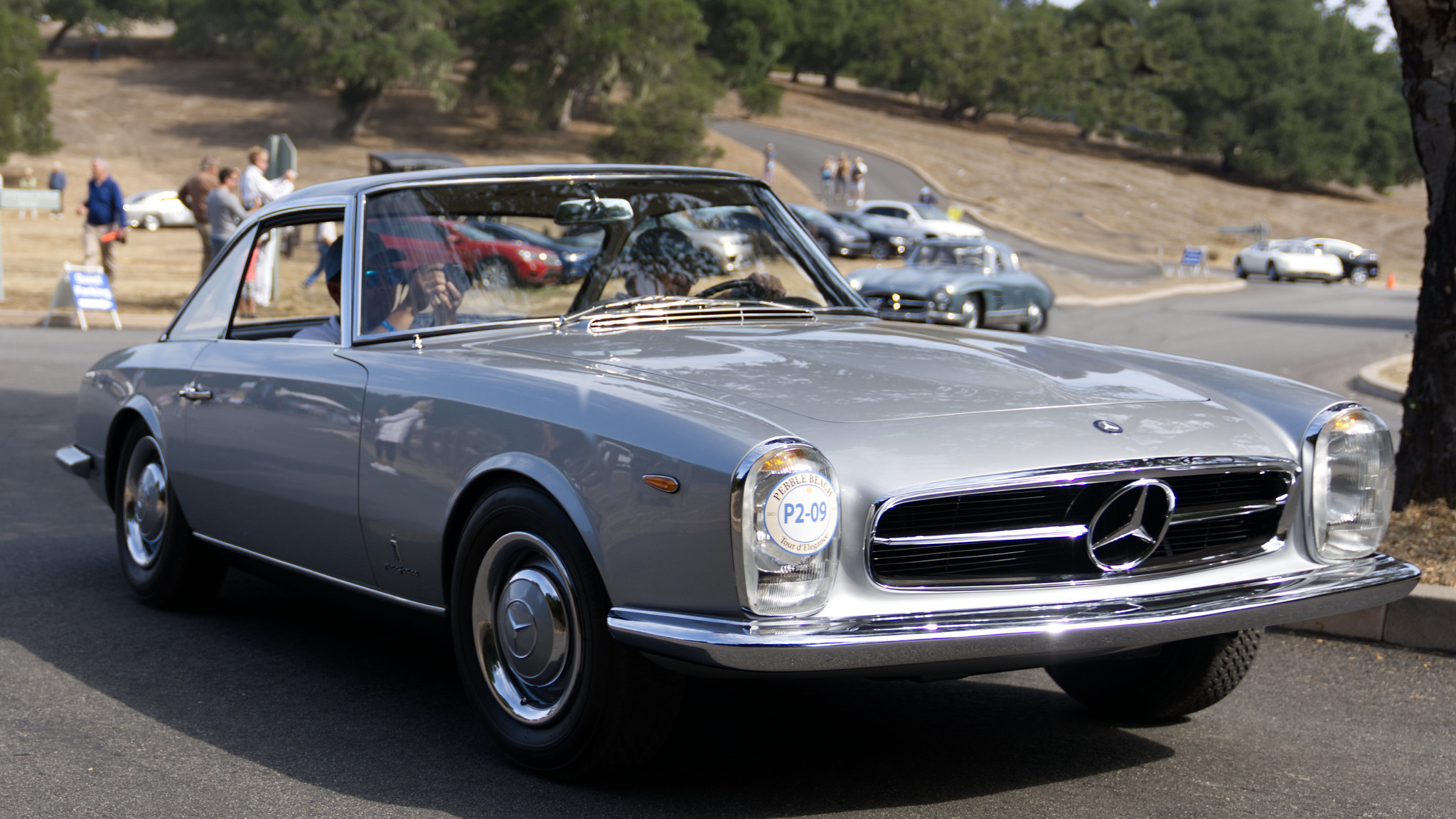
W113 by Pininfarina

While the original design by Paul Bracq is regarded highly today, it was more controversial at the time of its introduction. So in 1963, Pininfarina asked the Mercedes-Benz board to create its own custom-bodied version of the 230 SL. Pininfarina's Tom Tjaarda turned the roadster into a fixed-head coupé that vaguely resembled the Ferrari 250 GT Lusso. He retained the grille and headlamps of the original, but raked the grille more sharply, sculpted the wings, and made the sides more bulbous and thus wider, while making the bonnet narrower and shorter. The rear was reminiscent of the Ferrari 330 GT 2+2 (also a Tjaarda design), but without taking away the distinctive personality of the 230 SL. Inside, Tjaarda left the dashboard unchanged, but the interior as a whole exuded the stamp of elegant Italian hand craftsmanship known from contemporary Ferraris. The car never went into production and remained a one-off that was subsequently acquired by West German press baron Axel Springer. In 2022, it sold for $1.2m from a private collection in California.

==== W 113/12 ====
Mercedes-Benz Chief Engineer Rudolf Uhlenhaut liked pushing the power envelope of his cars. In 1965, he fitted a 250 SL with the massive 6,332 cc (6.3 L) 250 PS (184 kW; 247 hp) M100 V8 engine from the Mercedes-Benz 600. This engine conversion gave the car, denoted as W 113/12, impressive power, but made it very front-heavy, so that this direction was abandoned. The car was eventually destroyed, the usual procedure for test vehicles at the time.

==== Frua Shooting Brake ====
In 1966, the Turin coachbuilder Pietro Frua, a prominent car designer in Italy in the 1960s, presented a coachbuilt 230 SLX Shooting Brake version of the 230 SL.

==== R 113 W 33-29 ====
In 1968, Mercedes-Benz fitted a 280 SL with a 206 PS (152 kW; 203 hp) M50F Wankel engine, denoted as R 113 W 33-29. With a top-speed of 205.1 km/h (127.4 mph), a 0-60 mph (97 km/h) acceleration time of 8.7 seconds, and almost inaudible compared to regular SLs, it provided quite a surprise encounter for their owners in southern West Germany at the time.

=== Production numbers ===
Timeline
Model	Chassis	Engine	1963	1964	1965	1966	1967	1968	1969	1970	1971	Total	US
230 SL	W113.042	2.3L M127.II I6	1,465	6,911	6,325	4,945	185					19,831	4,752
250 SL	W113.043	2.5L M129.II I6				17	5,177	2				5,196	1,761
280 SL	W113.044	2.8L M130 I6					143	6,930	8,047	7,935	830	23,885	12,927
Total			1,465	6,911	6,325	4,962	5,505	6,932	8,047	7,935	830	48,912	19,440

== Motorsports ==
=== Spa-Sofia-Liège Rally ===
In 1963, Eugen Böhringer won the 6,600-kilometre Spa-Sofia-Liège Rally (Belgium to Bulgaria) on a race-modified 1963 230 SL. This vehicle was thought to have been destroyed for a long time, but turned up at a collector's house a few years ago. A newly build Replica is now in the permanent collection of the Mercedes-Benz Museum in Stuttgart Untertürkheim, Germany. On 14 September 1963, Dutch Grand Prix racer Carel Godin de Beaufort took second place in class in the Vaals hill climb in a stock 230SL.

In 1964, Mercedes-Benz entered a modified 230 SL for Eugen Böhringer/Klaus Kaiser into the Spa-Sofia-Liège Ralley. These cars had special 2.6-liter engines (probably with pairwise cylinder casts, a layout that was later adopted for M130 engine of the 280 SL). The 230 SL from the previous year was driven by Dieter Glemser and Martin Braungart, but did not finish. Due to considerable mechanical bad luck, Eugen Böhringer finished only third this time, after Rauno Aaltonen on Austin-Healey 3000 and Erik Carlsson on Saab.

=== Acropolis Rally ===
In 1965, Dieter Glemser entered the Acropolis Rally on a light-weight 230 SL similar to the Spa-Sofia-Liège cars. His tuned 2.3 liter engine produced 152 PS (112 kW; 150 hp), further evidence to the fact that 230 SL production engines rarely met their power specification. Unfortunately, Glemser was given wrong directions by the police, costing him his comfortable lead and relegating him to third place.

== In media ==
=== Magazines ===
- The Belgian webzine Gentlemen's Corner listed the W113 among its 20 "Most stylish cars of the past 50 years".
- GQ listed the W113 among the "Ten cars that made Mercedes-Benz".
- David Gandy of Vogue.com listed the W113 as one of his "15 favorite cars".
- The Daily Telegraph put the W113 on its list of "The 100 most beautiful cars" of all time.

=== Top Gear ===
On the British automotive TV show Top Gear (Season 3, Episode 8) the 280 SL is thought of highly, notably being described by the host at the time, Jeremy Clarkson, as one of the cars from the 1960s that has stood the test of time, being "from a time when Mercedes was still building its cars properly."

== Technical data ==
Technical data Mercedes-Benz SL (W113) (Manufacturer's figures except where stated)
Mercedes-Benz	230 SL	250 SL	280 SL
Produced:	1963–1967	1966–1968	1967–1971
Chassis code:	W113.042	W113.043	W113.044
Engine:	6-cylinder-inline engine (four-stroke), front-mounted		
Engine code:	M 127.II	M 129.II	M 130
Bore x Stroke:	82 mm (3.2 in) x 72.8 mm (2.9 in)	82 mm (3.2 in) x 78.8 mm (3.1 in)	86.5 mm (3.4 in) x 78.8 mm (3.1 in)
Displacement:	2308 cc	2496 cc	2778 cc
Max. Power @ rpm:	150 PS (110 kW; 148 hp) @ 5500	150 PS (110 kW; 148 hp) @ 5500	170 PS (125 kW; 168 hp) @ 5750
Max. Torque @ rpm:	196 N⋅m (145 lb⋅ft) @ 4200	216 N⋅m (159 lb⋅ft) @ 4200	240 N⋅m (177 lb⋅ft) @ 4500
Compression Ratio:	9.3: 1	9.5: 1	9.5: 1
Fuel feed:	Multi-port fuel injection, Bosch mechanical injection pump		
Fuel tank capacity:	65 L (17.2 US gal; 14.3 imp gal)	82 L (21.7 US gal; 18.0 imp gal)	
Valvetrain:	SOHC, single roller chain	SOHC, duplex chain	
Cooling:	Water		
Gearbox:	4-speed manual, 4-speed automatic or 5-speed manual rear wheel drive, standard axle ratio 3.75:1 (on request 3.69:1 or 3.92:1)		
Electrical system:	12 volt		
Front suspension:	Double wishbones, coil springs, stabilising bar		
Rear suspension::	Swing axle, radius arms, compensating spring, coil springs		
Brakes:	Disc/Drum brakes (Ø 253 mm (10.0 in) front, 230 mm (9.1 in) rear), power assisted	Disc brakes all around (Ø 273 mm (10.7 in) front, 279 mm (11.0 in) rear), power assisted	
Steering:	Recirculating ball steering, on request power-assisted		
Body structure:	Sheet steel, monocoque (unibody) construction		
Dry weight:	1,300 kg (2,900 lb) (hardtop + 49 kg (108 lb))	1,360 kg (3,000 lb) (hardtop + 49 kg (108 lb))	
Loaded weight:	1,650 kg (3,640 lb)	1,715 kg (3,781 lb)	
Track front/ rear:	1,485 mm (58.5 in) 1,485 mm (58.5 in)		
Wheelbase:	2,400 mm (94 in)		
Length:	4,285 mm (168.7 in)		
Width:	1,760 mm (69 in)		
Height:	1,305 mm (51.4 in)		
Tyre/Tire sizes:	185 HR 14		
Top speed:	200 km/h (124 mph)	195 km/h (121 mph)	200 km/h (124 mph)
Fuel Consumption (estimate):	15.0 litres per 100 kilometres (18.8 mpg_{‑imp}; 15.7 mpg_{‑US})	16.0 litres per 100 kilometres (17.7 mpg_{‑imp}; 14.7 mpg_{‑US})	16.5 litres per 100 kilometres (17.1 mpg_{‑imp}; 14.3 mpg_{‑US})
Price Germany; USA:	22,200 DM $7,506−$7,907, later $6,185−$6,587	22,800 DM $6,485−$6,897	24,300 DM $6,485−$6,897, later $7,469−$7,909

== Famous owners ==
Prominent owners of the W113 (mainly 280 SL) included Joan Collins, David Coulthard (midnight blue 1971 280 SL), Tony Curtis, Walt Disney, Juan Manuel Fangio (230SL), John Gutfreund, Charlton Heston, Julio Iglesias, Gene Kelly, John Lennon (dark blue 1965 230 SL, for sale for $495,000 in 2011), Sophia Loren, Kate Moss (metallic blue 280 SL), Stirling Moss, Stevie Nicks, Colin Powell, Priscilla Presley (white 1969 280SL, a gift from her then-husband Elvis Presley, now on permanent display at Graceland), Burt Reynolds, Nico Rosberg, Axel Springer (whose Pininfarina Coupe sold for $1.2M in 2022), John Travolta (havana brown 1970 280 SL, stolen in September 2011) and Peter Ustinov.

== See also ==
- Mercedes-Benz SL-Class
