= Mercedes-Benz 380 =

Mercedes-Benz has sold a number of automobiles with the "380" model name:

- 1933 380
- 1981–1985 R107
  - 1981 380SLC
  - 1981–1985 380SL
- 1981–1985 W126
  - 1981–1983 380SEL
  - 1982–1983 380SEC
  - 1984–1985 380SE
