= Friedrich Geiger =

German automobile designer

- Friedrich Geiger.
- Born: 24 November 1907; Süßen, German Empire
- Died: June 13, 1996 (aged 88); Bad Überkingen, Germany
- Known for: Automobile design

Friedrich Geiger (24 November 1907 – 13 June 1996) was a German automobile designer who designed the pre-World War II Mercedes-Benz 540K and post-war Mercedes-Benz 300SL, which are among the most highly regarded cars in automotive history.

== Biography ==
Born in Süßen in the Swabian region of southern Germany, Geiger originally trained as a cartwright, before studying as a design engineer at University prior to joining Daimler-Benz in April 1933. He began in the special vehicles manufacturing department, where, in the 1930s, he was responsible for the 500K and 540K sports cars.

Geiger left Daimler-Benz in April 1948, but returned to the company two years later, this time as a test engineer in the styling department. He became head of styling within a few years, after designing the 300SL gullwing coupé, named one of the ten greatest Mercedes ever built and one of the 25 greatest cars of the 20th century.

Geiger continued to work at Daimler-Benz until his retirement in December 1973, by which time he had helped create the W111/W112 (1959) and W110 (1961) "Fintails", the W113 "Pagoda" (1963) and R107 (1971) SL coupé/convertibles, the W108/109 (1965) and W116 (1972) series of the S-Class, the mid-size W123 range, and the Mercedes-Benz 600 limousine (1963).

Geiger was succeeded by Bruno Sacco, one of his staff at the styling department.

Geiger died in Bad Überkingen in 1996, aged 88.

== Gallery ==
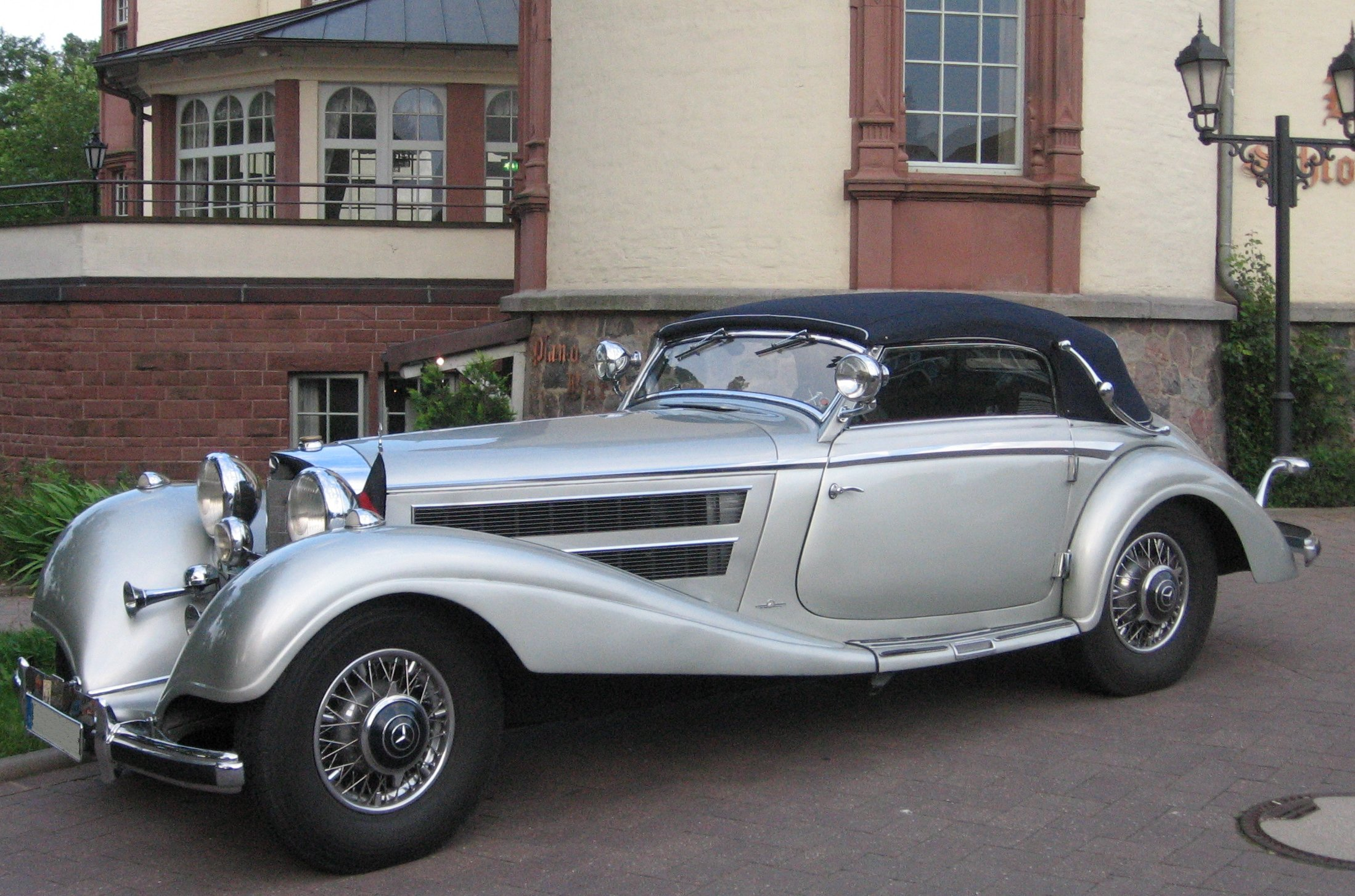
Mercedes-Benz 500K cabriolet

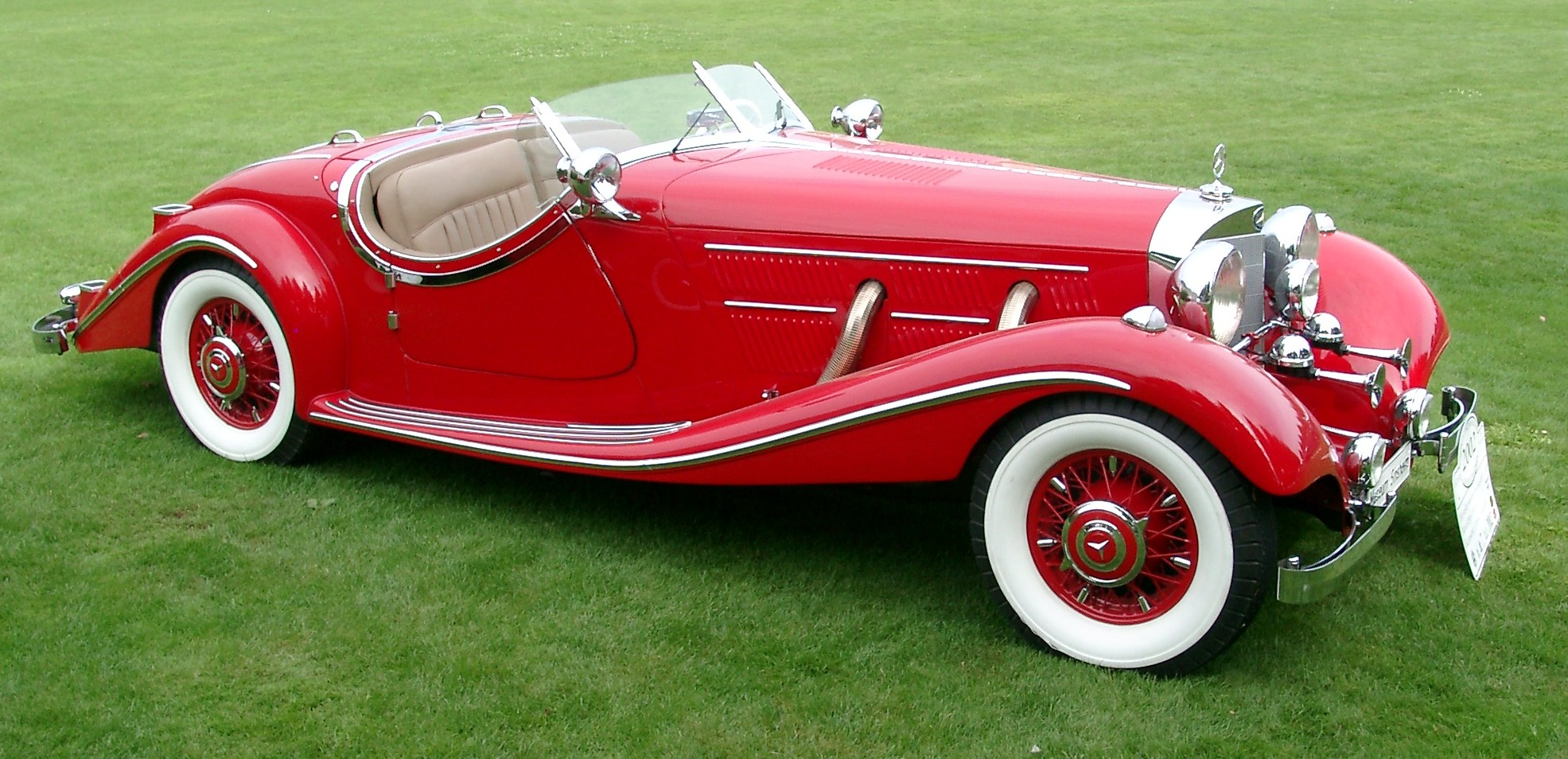
Mercedes-Benz 540K cabriolet

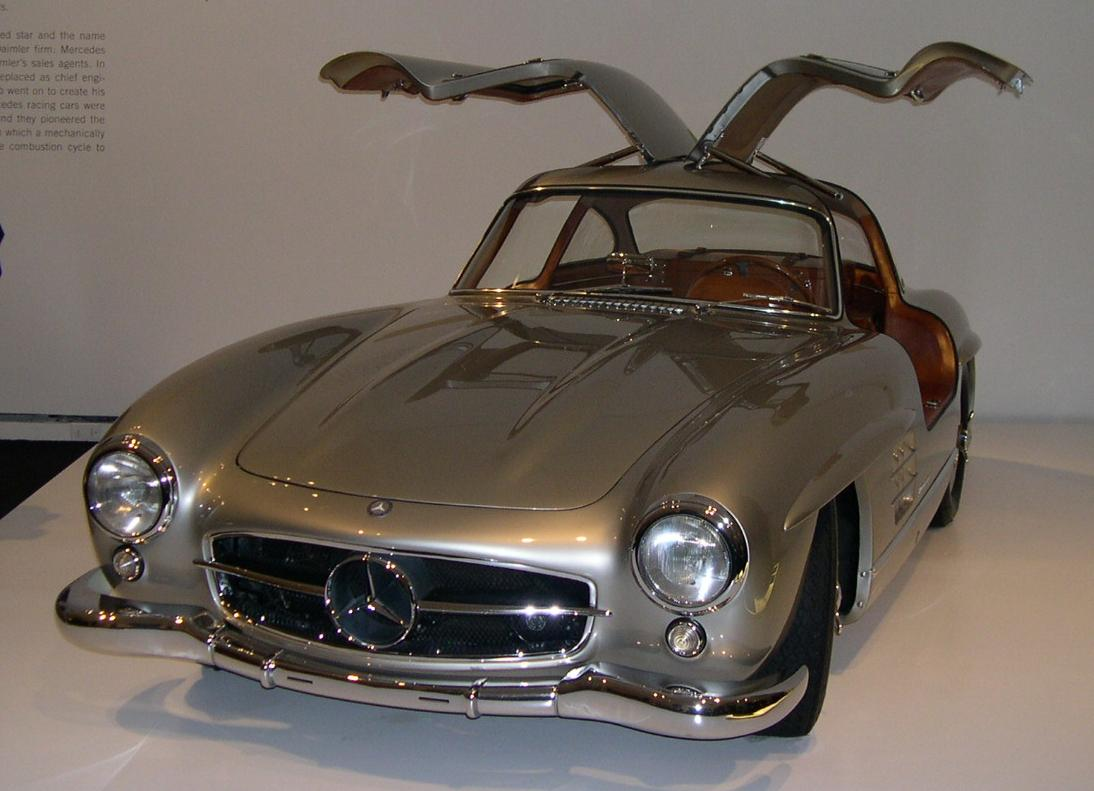
1955 Mercedes-Benz 300 SL with its gullwing doors open
