= Mercedes-Benz 500K =

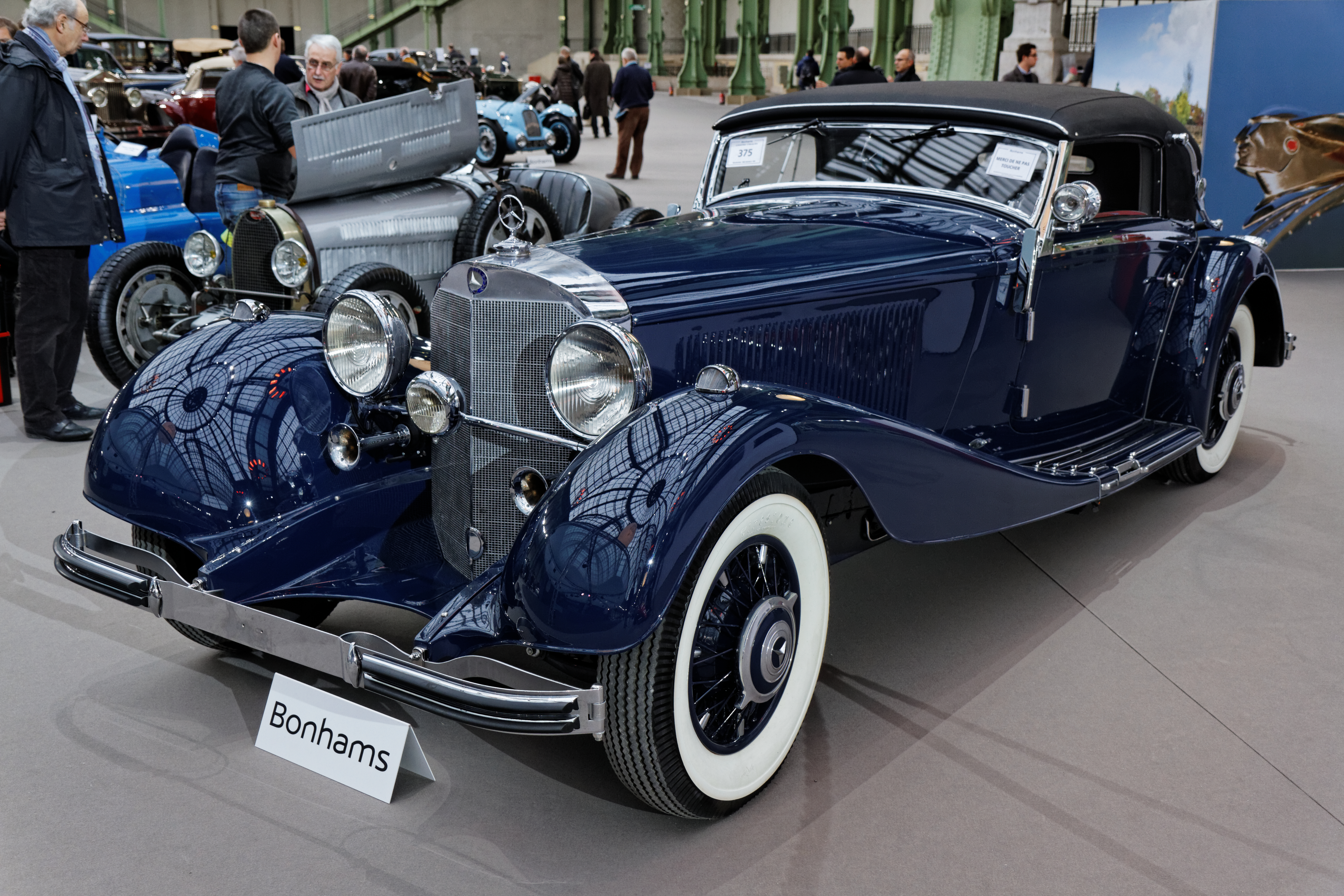
- Mercedes-Benz 500K Cabriolet A

Overview
- Manufacturer: Mercedes-Benz
- Production: 1934–1936
- Assembly: Germany: Sindelfingen
- Designer: Friedrich Geiger

Body and chassis
- Body style: 2-door convertible
- Layout: FR layout

Powertrain
- Engine: 5,018 cc (5.018 L) I8
- Transmission: 4-speed manual 5-speed manual (optional)

Dimensions
- Wheelbase: 2,980 mm (117.3 in) (SWB); 3,290 mm (129.5 in) (LWB)
- Curb weight: Up to 2,700 kg (6,000 lb)

Chronology
- Predecessor: Mercedes-Benz 380SSK
- Successor: Mercedes-Benz 540K

The Mercedes-Benz 500K (W29) is a grand touring car built by Mercedes-Benz between 1934 and 1936. First exhibited at the 1934 Berlin Motor Show. It is distinguished from the 500 sedan by the "K" for Kompressor (German for supercharger). it succeeded the Mercedes-Benz 380 introduced the previous year, It offered both a larger, more powerful engine and more opulent coachwork to meet customers' demands for greater luxury and performance.

== Specifications ==
The 500K used the same independent suspension as had been introduced on the 380, with a double wishbone front axle, double-joint swing axle at the rear, and separate wheel location, coil springs and damping, a world first. Consequently, it was a more comfortable and better handling car than Mercedes' previous S/SS/SSK generation of roadsters from the 1920s, and offered greater appeal to buyers, particularly the growing number of well-heeled female drivers of the time.

Pressing the throttle pedal fully engaged the Roots supercharger, inducing the five litre straight-eight engine to produce up to 160 horsepower (120 kW) and making the car capable of over 160 kilometres per hour (100 mph), while consuming fuel at the rate of up to 30 L/100 km (9.4 mpg_{‑imp}; 7.8 mpg_{‑US}) as it did so.

Three different chassis and eight bodies were available for customers; the two longer "B" and "C" four-seat cabriolet versions rode on a wheelbase of 3,290 mm (129.5 in), and would later be used on other sedan and touring car models. The short "A" chassis, with a 2,980 mm (117.3 in) wheelbase, underpinned the two-seater models: the Motorway Courier, and the 1936 Special Roadster which offered the highest performance. All models featured such advanced equipment as safety glass, hydraulic brakes, and a 12-volt electrical system sufficient to bear the load of the electric windscreen wipers, door locks, and indicators.

== Production figures ==
Of the combined production of the 500K (342 cars), including 29 "Special Roadsters" during its two years in production, and the later 540K (419 cars) from Sindelfingen, the deliveries were:

- 70 chassis without body
- 28 open cars (offener Tourenwagen)
- 23 sedans with 4 doors (mainly 500K)
- 29 sedans with 2 doors (mainly 540K)
- 12 Coupés
- 6 Autobahn cruisers (Autobahn-kurier)
- 58 Roadsters
- 116 Cabriolets A
- 296 Cabriolets B
- 122 Cabriolets C

== Popular culture ==
Cruella de Vil, the fictional character in One Hundred and One Dalmatians, drives a red and black automobile which strongly resembles a Mercedes-Benz 500K Cabriolet, an Alvis Speed 20 and a Bugatti Royale.

== Gallery ==
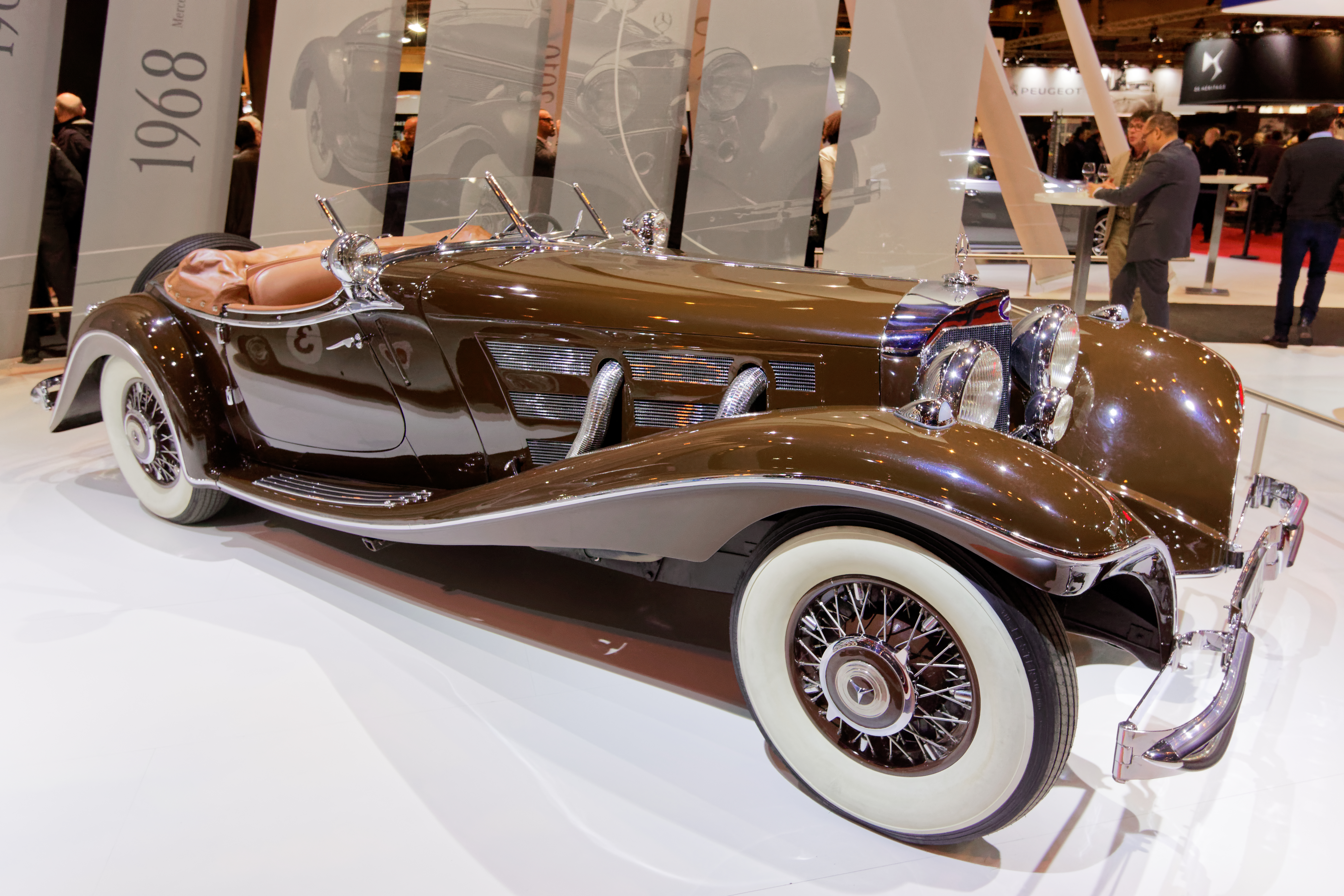
1934 Mercedes-Benz 500K, at Rétromobile 2017

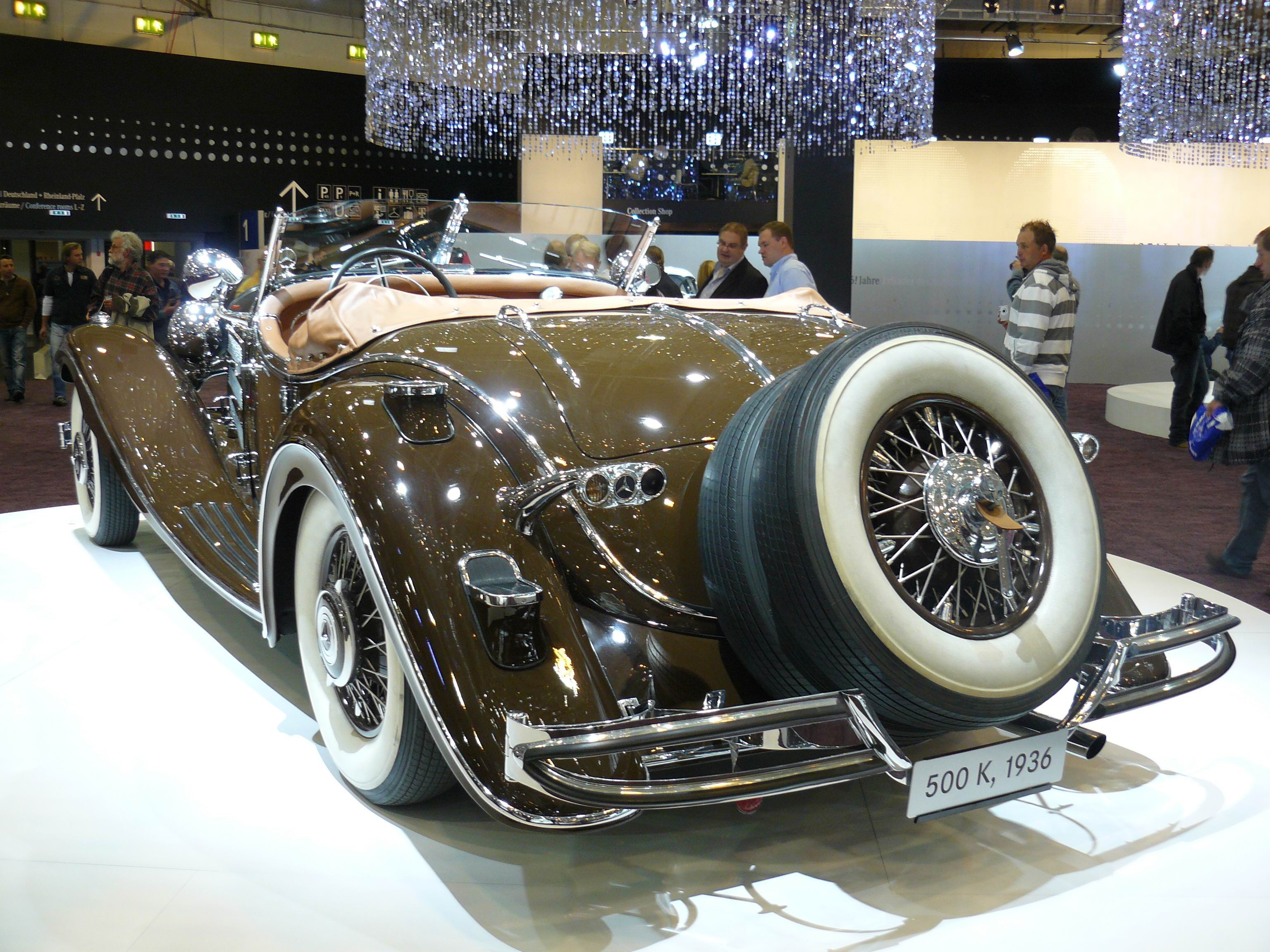
Mercedes-Benz 500K from the rear

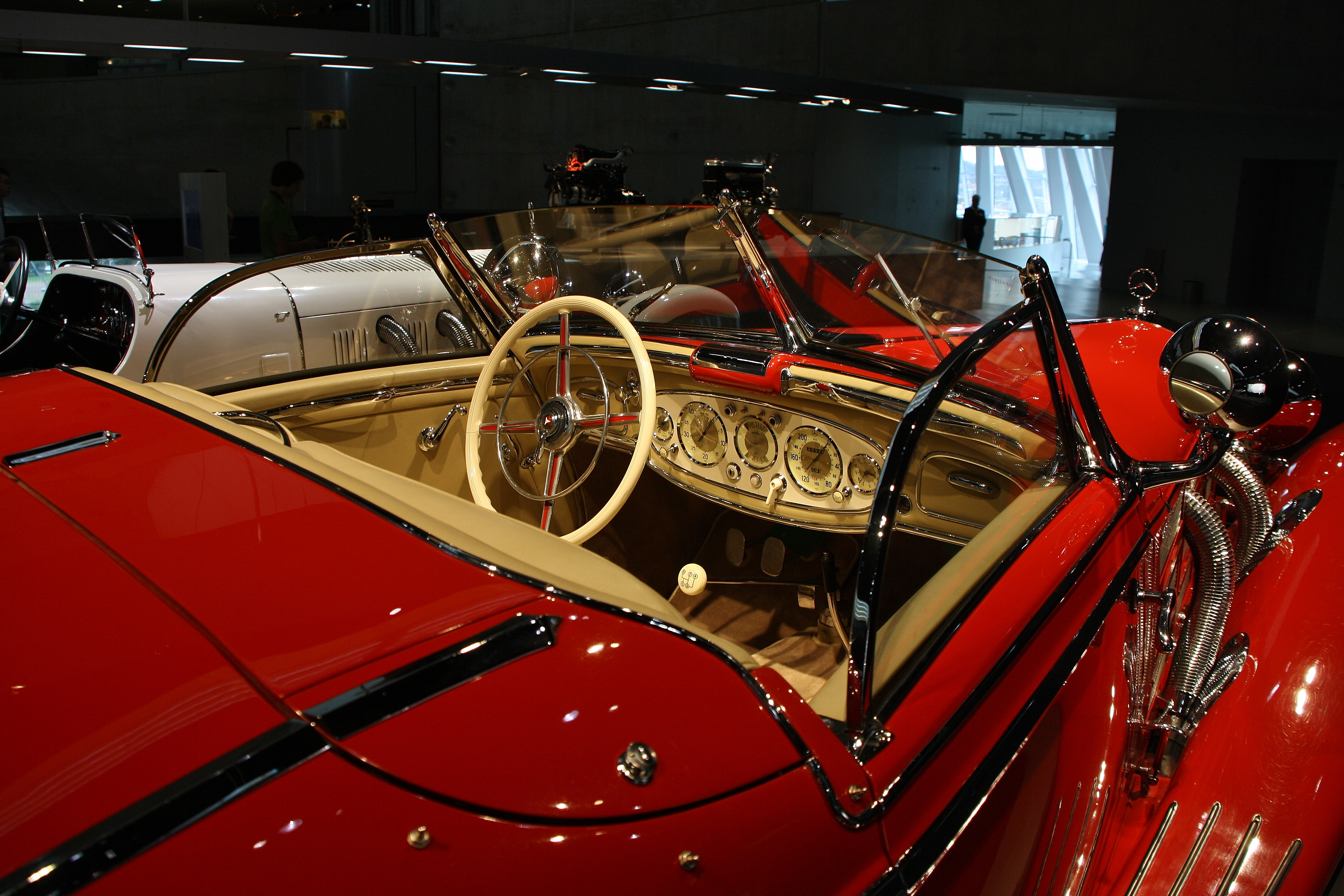
Mercedes-Benz 500K cockpit

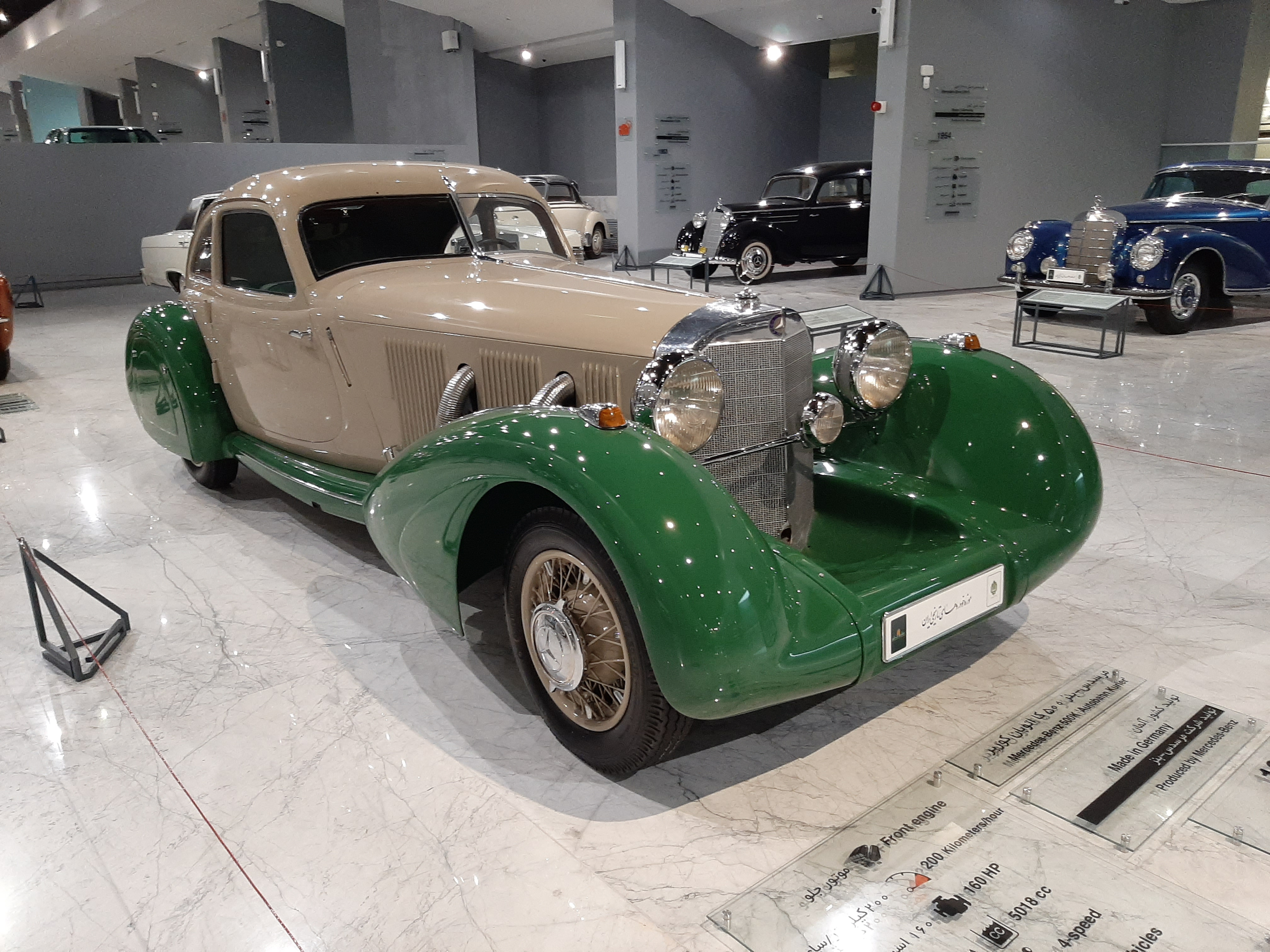
Mercedes-Benz 500K Autobahn cruiser at National Car Museum of Iran that belonged to Reza Pahlavi, former Shah of Iran

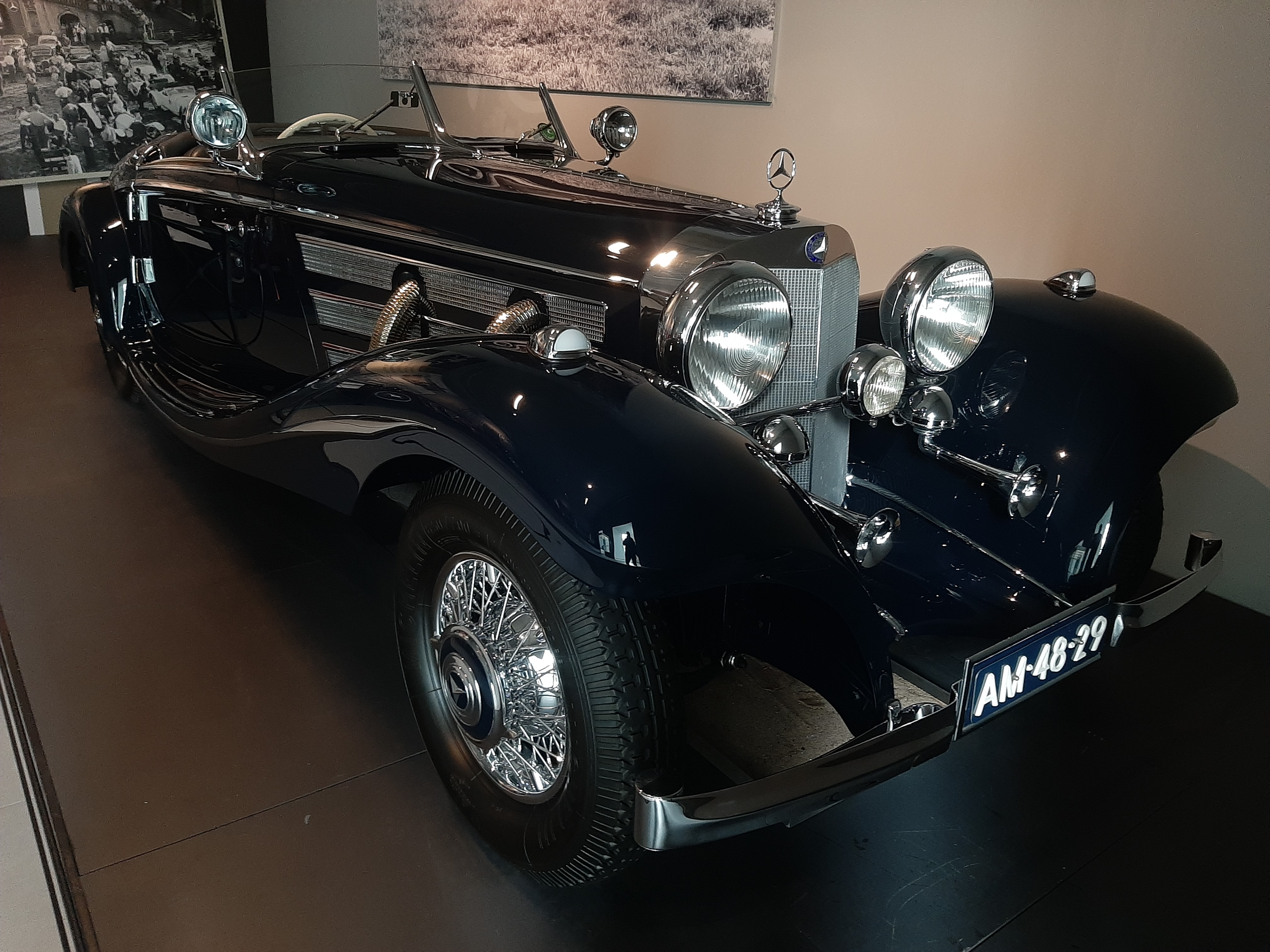
1936 Mercedes-Benz 500K Special Roadster at the Louwman Museum in The Hague, Netherlands

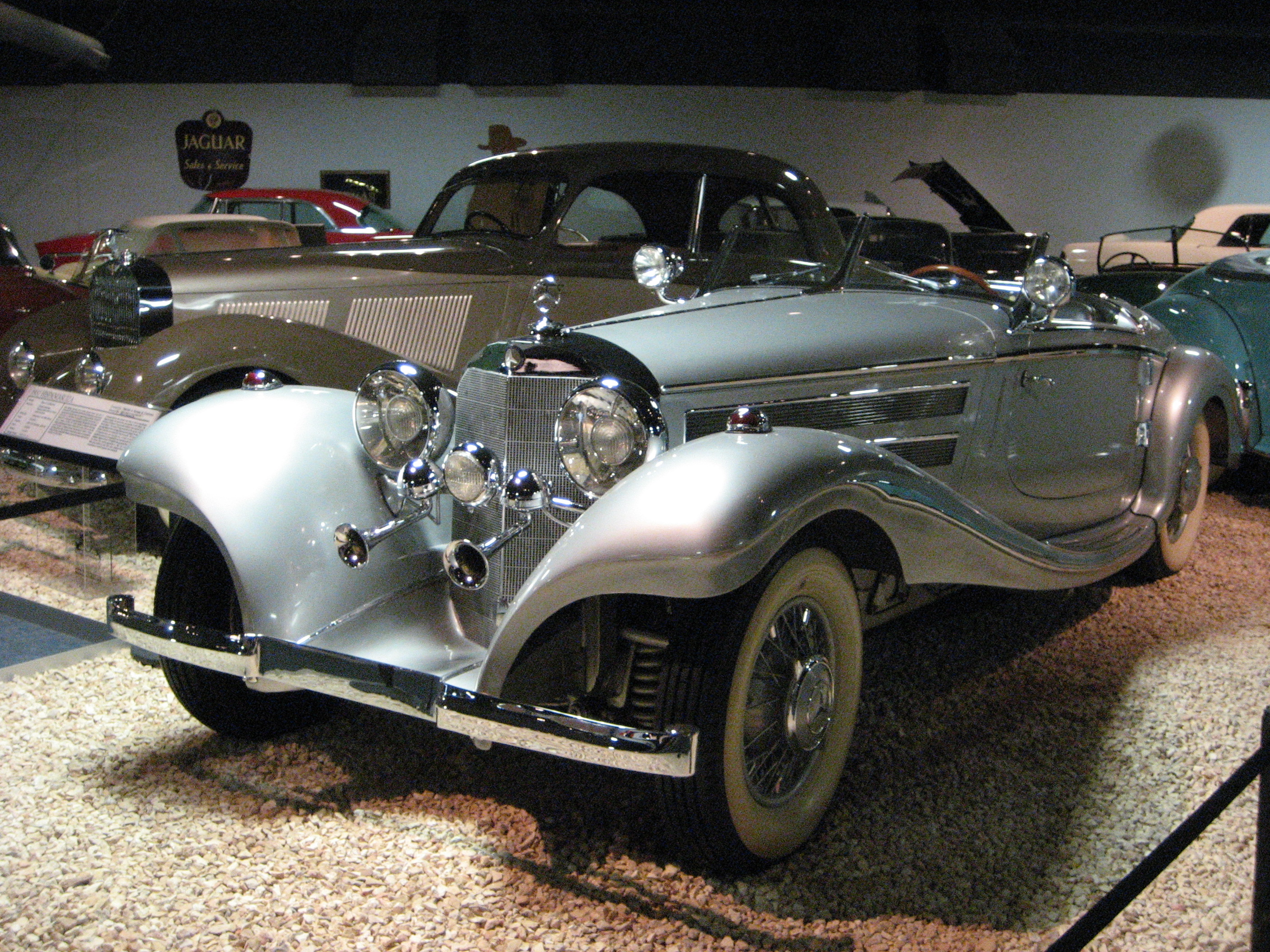
1936 Mercedes-Benz 500K Special Roadster, Harrah Collection; National Automobile Museum; Reno, Nevada
