= Mercedes-Benz 540K =

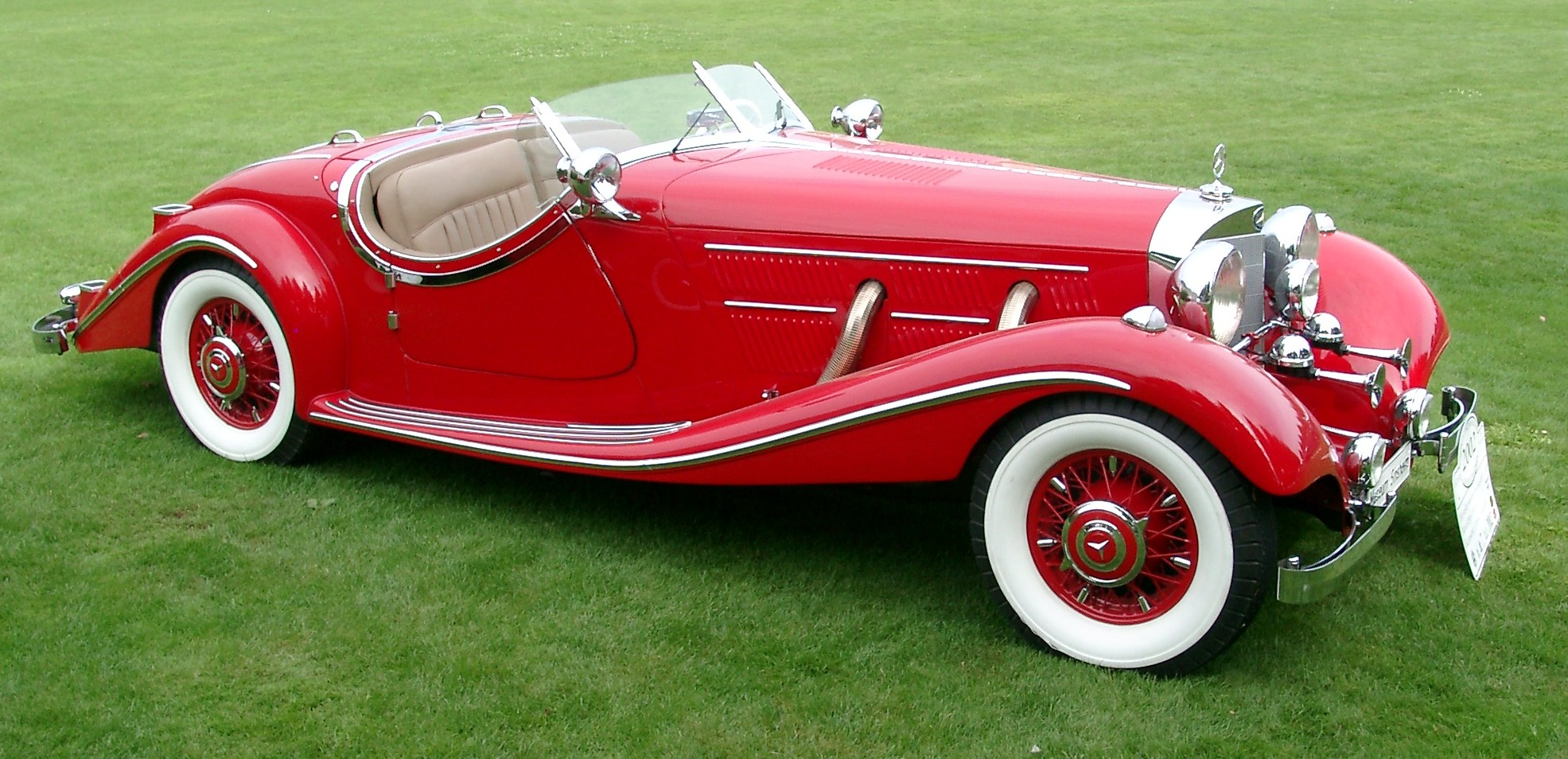
- 1939 Mercedes-Benz 540K Special Roadster

Overview
- Manufacturer: Mercedes-Benz
- Also called: Mercedes-Benz W29/W24
- Production: 1936–1940 (chassis; last bodies completed in 1944)
- Assembly: Germany: Sindelfingen
- Designer: Friedrich Geiger

Body and chassis
- Body style: two seater cabriolet; four seater coupé; seven seater limousine
- Layout: FR layout

Powertrain
- Engine: 5,401 cc I8
- Transmission: 4-speed manual 5-speed manual (optional on late cars)

Dimensions
- Wheelbase: 2,980 mm (117.3 in) (SWB); 3,290 mm (129.5 in) (Normal); 3,880 mm (152.8 in) (Special)
- Length: 4,480–5,360 mm (176.4–211.0 in)
- Width: 1,820–1,930 mm (71.7–76.0 in)
- Height: 1,480–1,630 mm (58.3–64.2 in)
- Curb weight: Up to 2,170–2,500 kg (4,780–5,510 lb)

Chronology
- Predecessor: Mercedes-Benz 500K
- Successor: Mercedes-Benz 580K (Prototype only)

The Mercedes-Benz 540K (W29) is a grand touring car built by the German firm Mercedes-Benz between 1936 and 1940.

== History ==
Introduced at the 1936 Paris Motor Show, the Friedrich Geiger designed car was a development of the 500K, itself a development of the SSK. Available as a both a two- and four-seat cabriolet, four seater coupé or seven seater limousine (with armoured sides and armoured glass), the 540K was one of the largest cars of its time, and it retailed for 28,000 RM (approximately $230,000 in 2021) in 1936.

The straight-8 cylinder engine of the 500K was enlarged in displacement to 5,401 cubic centimetres (329.6 cu in). It was fed by twin pressurized updraft carburetors, developing 115 hp (86 kW). In addition, there was an attached Roots supercharger, which could either be engaged manually for short periods, or automatically when the accelerator was pushed fully to the floor. This increased power to 180 hp (130 kW), enabling a top speed of 170 kilometres per hour (110 mph).

Power was sent to the rear wheels through a four-speed or optional five-speed manual gearbox that featured synchromesh on the top three gears. Vacuum-assisted hydraulic brakes kept the car under the driver's control.

The 540K had the same chassis layout as the 500K, but it was significantly lightened by replacing the girder-like frame of the 500K with oval-section tubes - an influence of the Silver Arrows racing campaign.

To meet individual wishes of customers, three chassis variants were available, as for the 500K: two long versions with a 3,290 mm (130 in) wheelbase, differing in terms of powertrain and bodywork layout; and a short version with 2,980 mm (117 in). The long variant, termed the normal chassis with the radiator directly above the front axle, served as the backbone for the four-seater cabriolets, the 'B' (with four side windows) and 'C' (with two side windows), and for touring cars and saloons. The shorter chassis was for the two-seater cabriolet 'A', set up on a chassis on which radiator, engine, cockpit and all rearward modules were moved 185 mm (7.3 in) back from the front axle.

As usual with Mercedes cars of this period the Sindelfingen factory provided in-house coach work, and employed 1,500 people to create the 540K, thus allowing for a great deal of owner customisation, meaning only 70 chassis were ever bodied by independent builders. Owners included Jack L. Warner of Warner Brothers film studios.

With the outbreak of World War II in 1939, the proposed further boring-out of the engine to 5,800 cubic centimetres (5.8 L) for a 580K was aborted, probably after only one such car was made. Chassis production ceased in 1940, with the final 2 being completed that year, and earlier chassis were still being bodied at a steady rate during 1940, with smaller numbers being completed in the 1941–1943 period. Regular replacement bodies were ordered in 1944 for a few cars.

== Special saloon (W24) ==
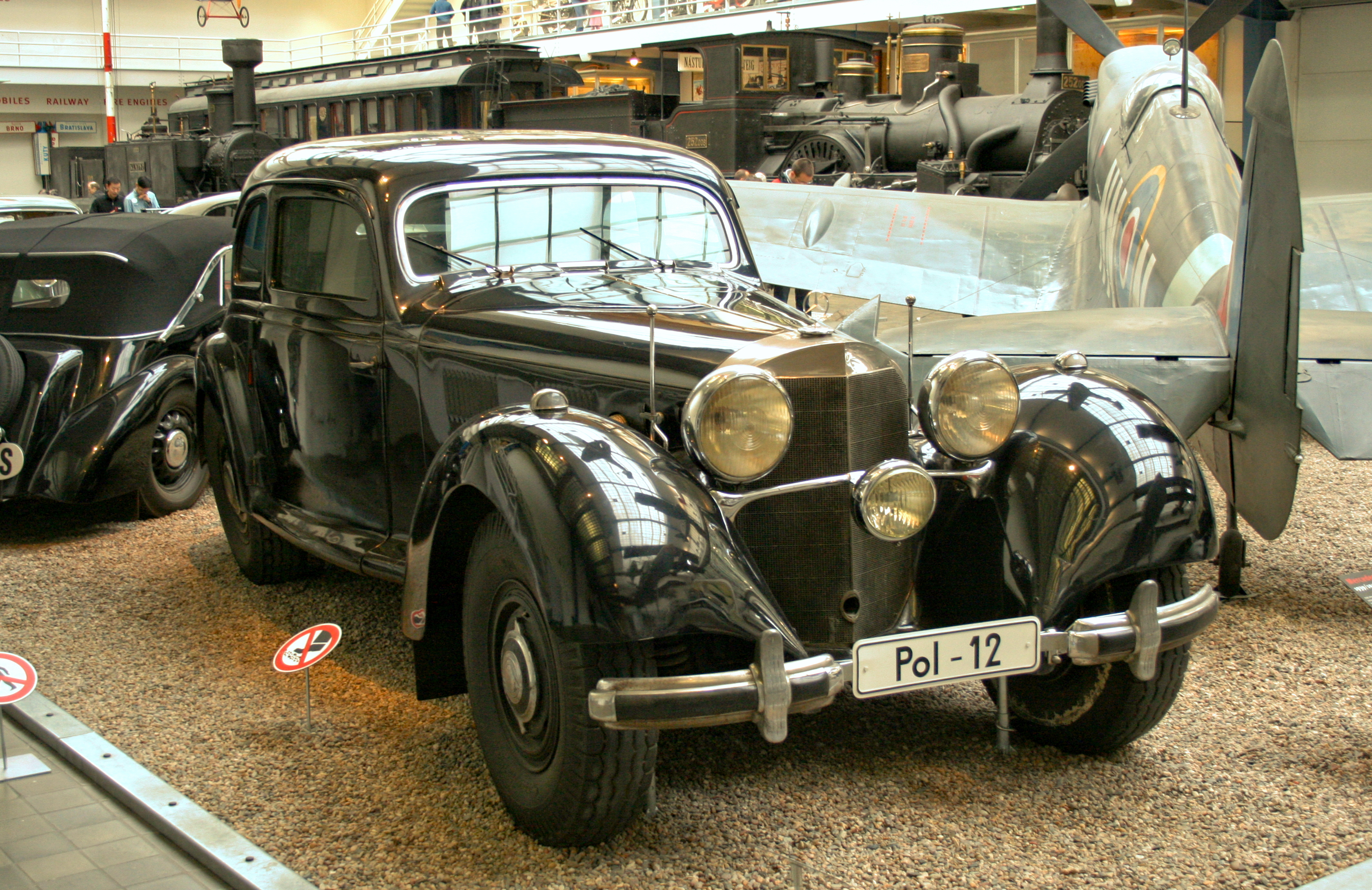
Mercedes-Benz 540K (W24)

On top of the normal and roadster cars, 12 special cars were developed on an extended chassis length with a 3,880 mm (153 in) wheelbase. All of these cars were developed for the Nazi hierarchy, as six seater convertible saloons. To allow for armour plate, these cars had developed De Dion rear suspension. Due to their higher weight, their maximum speed was 140 km/h (87 mph).

After the assassination attempt on Reinhard Heydrich in Prague at the end of May 1942, the Reich Chancellery would only use armoured cars for ministers and leaders of friendly powers. Beside 20 large Mercedes-Benz 770s, in 1942 they ordered an additional 20 540Ks developed as two door armoured saloons. These were delivered during 1942 and 1943. A further order for 17 armoured saloons was placed in late 1943, and these were delivered in April 1944. One of these cars was given as a gift from Adolf Hitler to Ante Pavelić, leader of the Independent State of Croatia. After the war, this car was captured and used first by Ivan Krajacic, and then by Josip Broz Tito.

== Hermann Goering's "Blue Goose" ==
In 1936, Mercedes-Benz introduced the 540K special, designated 540Ks. Based on the shorter 2,980 mm (117 in) wheelbase chassis, its body was carefully crafted. Its price tag of 28,000 Reichsmarks, some RM6,000 above the price of standard models, meant only 32 were ever built.

In 1937, Reichsmarschall Hermann Goering ordered a 540Ks, in his favourite colour of "Luftwaffe" blue with his family crest on both doors. It included armour-plated sides and bulletproof glass. Nicknamed the "Blue Goose", Goering was often photographed in the car.

On May 4, 1945, the US Army, C Company, 326th Engineers, 101st Airborne Division 'Screaming Eagles' entered Berchtesgaden, and on finding the car took possession. Major General Maxwell Taylor used the car as his command vehicle in West Germany until it was commissioned by the US Treasury. Shipped to Washington, D.C., it successfully toured the United States in a victory bond tour. In 1956, the car was auctioned off by the US Army at the Aberdeen Proving Grounds in Maryland and sold to Jacques Tunick of Greenwich, Connecticut, with a high bid of $2167.

In 1958, Tunick sold the car to the private collection of veterinarian Dr. George Bitgood Jr., who had it repainted in black and the chrome re-plated. Kept private, Bitgood only displayed it once, at the 1973 county fair in Durham, Connecticut. After Bitgood's death, the "Blue Goose" was shown by his family in June 2002 at the 101st Airborne Reunion at Fort Campbell, Kentucky. The car was then sold to Carnlough International Limited of Guernsey, on the agreement that it be restored to its condition "as found" at Berchtesgaden.

== Production figures ==
Of the combined production of the 500K (342 cars) and 540K (419 cars) from Sindelfingen, deliveries were:

- 70 chassis without body
- 28 open cars (offener Tourenwagen)
- 23 saloons with 4 doors (mainly 500K)
- 29 saloons with 2 doors (mainly 540K)
- 12 Coupés
- 6 Autobahn cruisers (Autobahn-kurier)
- 58 Roadsters
- 116 Cabriolets A
- 296 Cabriolets B
- 122 Cabriolets C

== Gallery ==
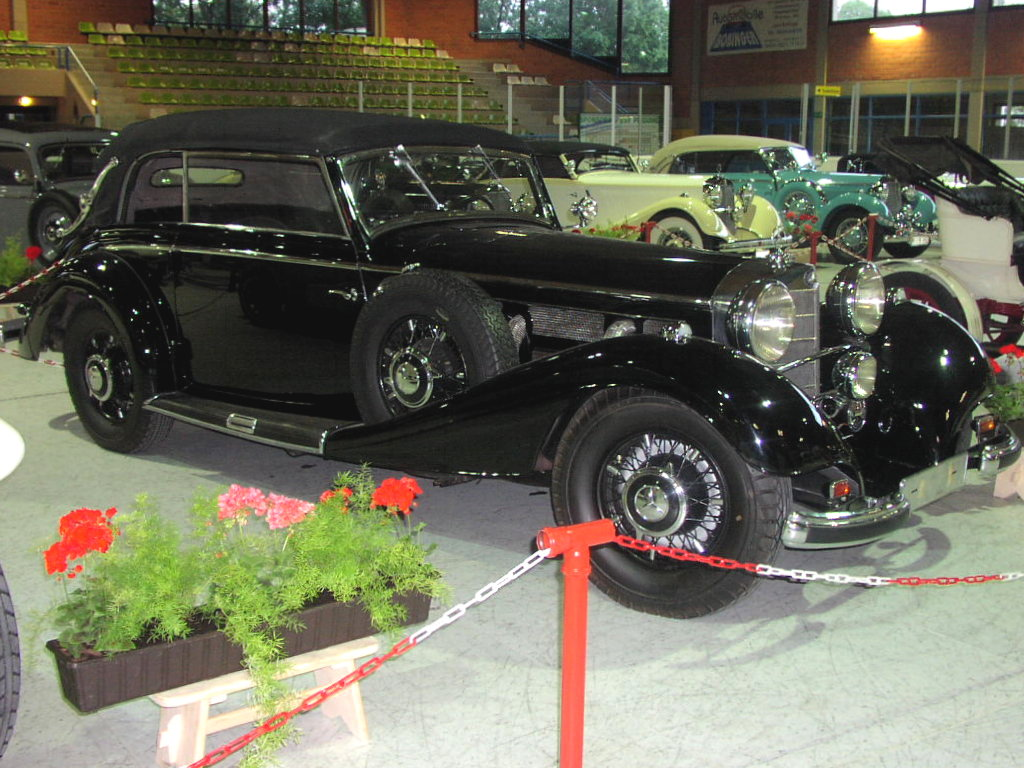
1936 Mercedes-Benz 540K Cabriolet B

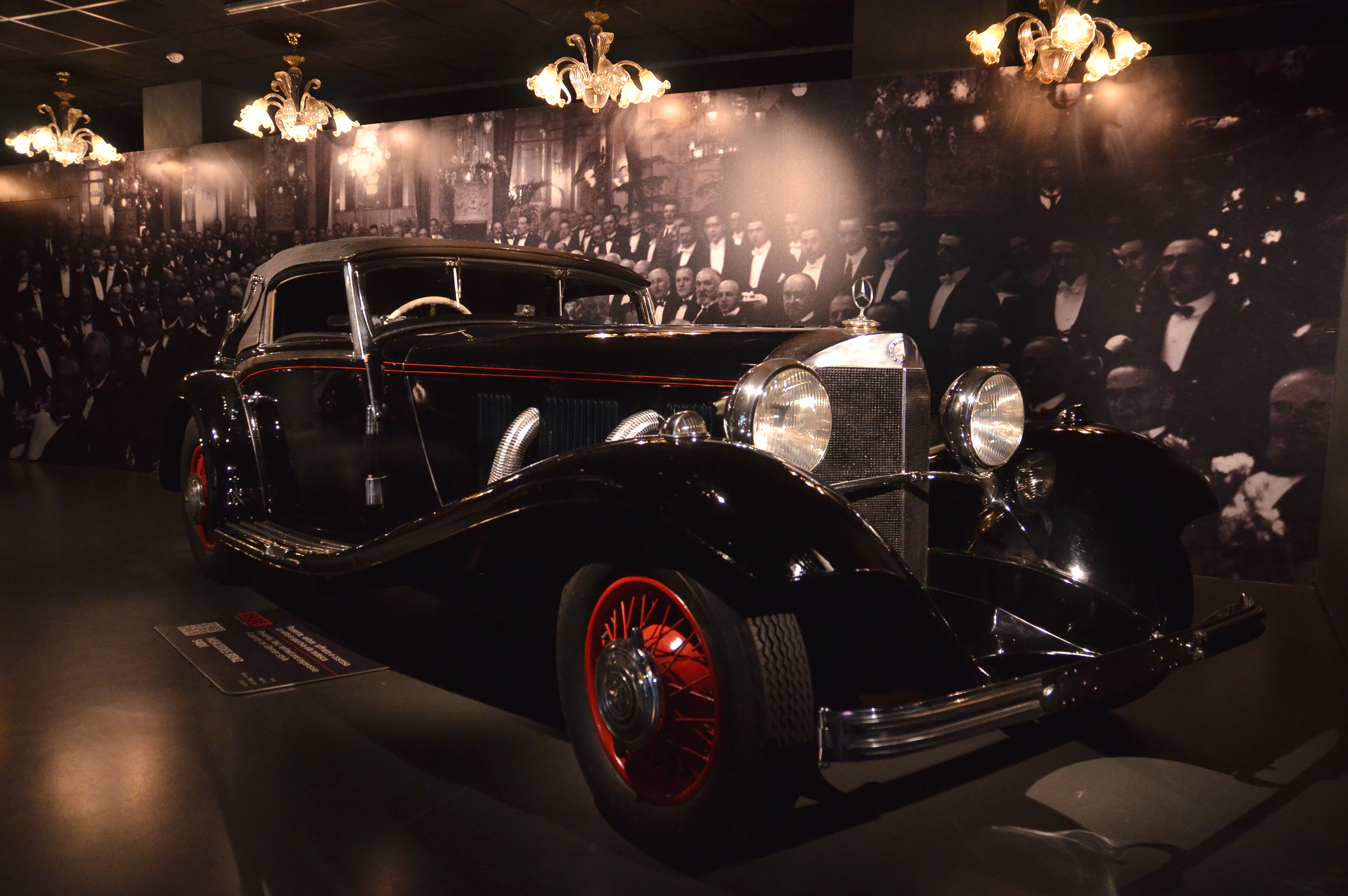
1936 Mercedes-Benz 540K Cabriolet at the Museo dell'Automobile, Turin

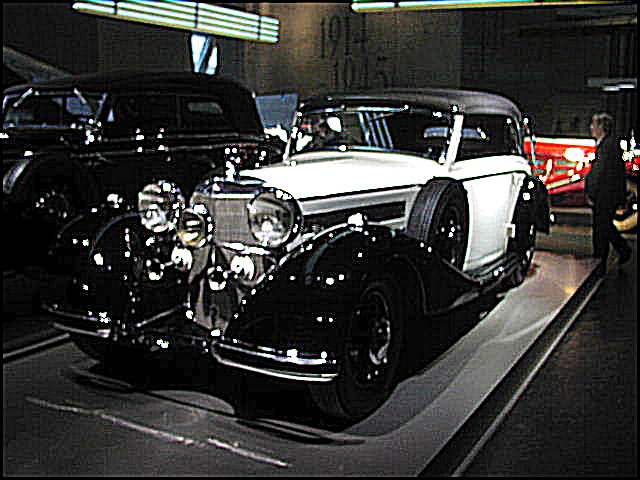
1937 Mercedes-Benz 540K Cabriolet B at Mercedes-Benz Museum, Stuttgart

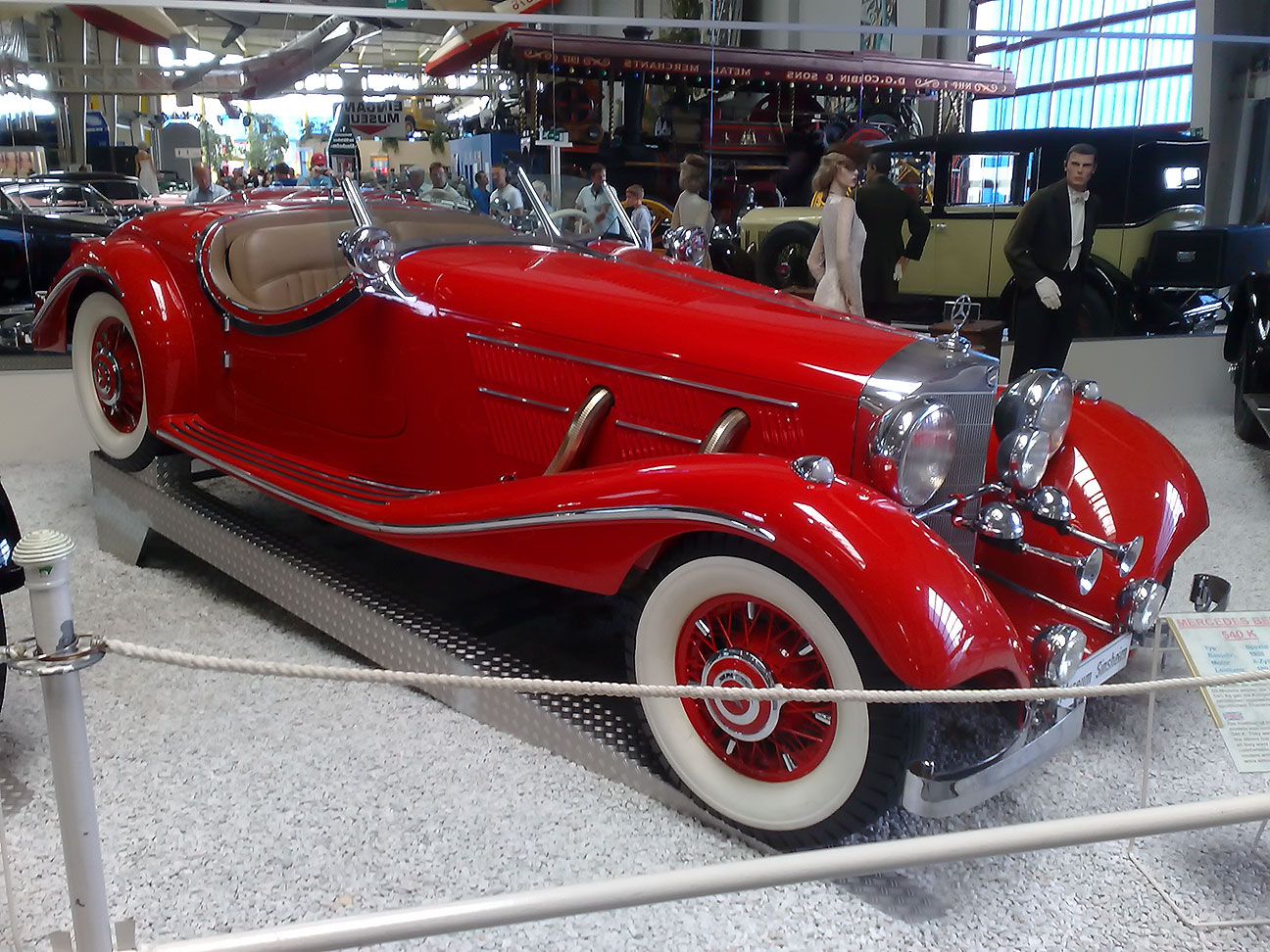
1938 Mercedes-Benz 540K Special Roadster at Auto & Technik Museum, Sinsheim

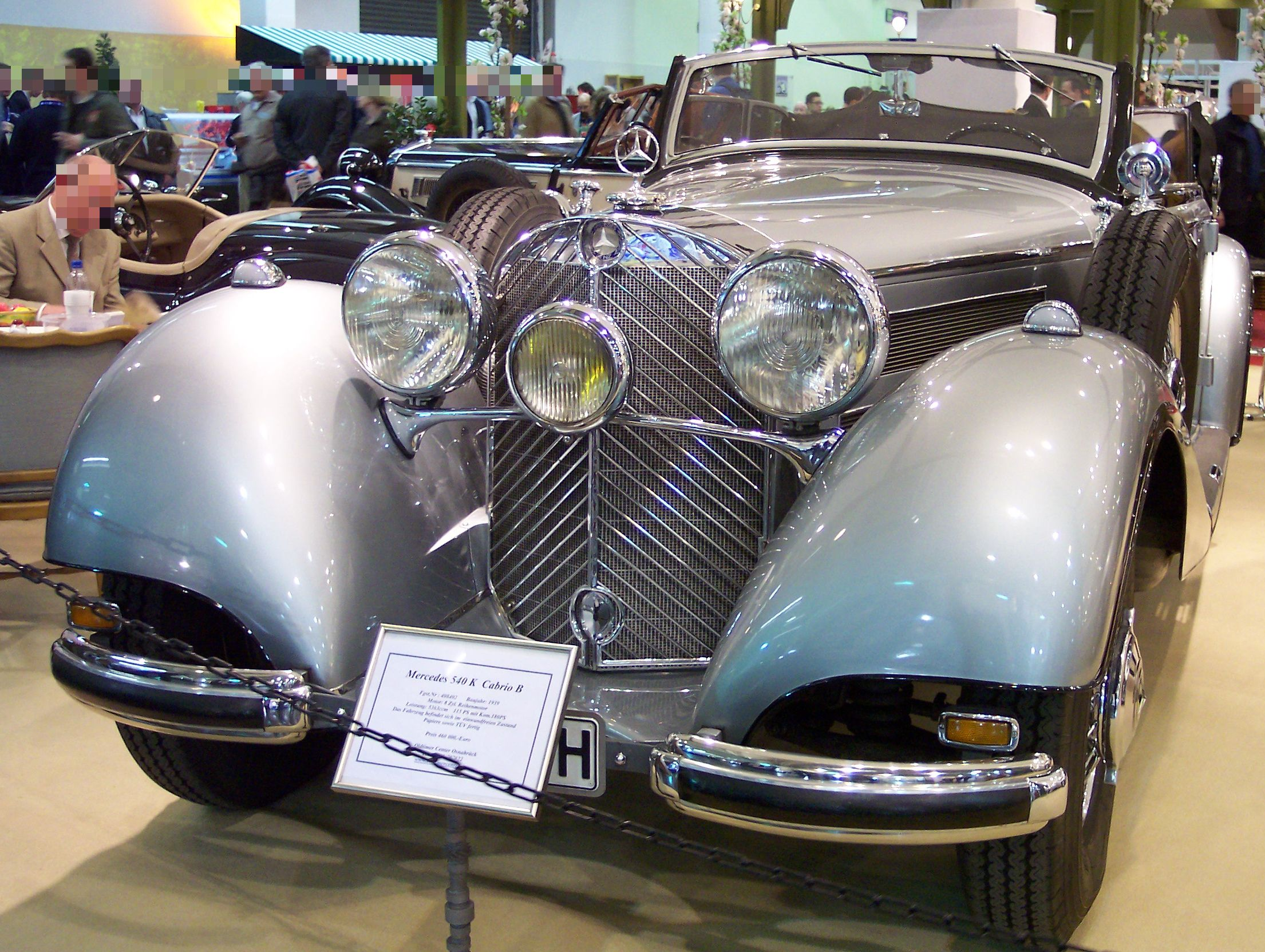
1938 Mercedes-Benz 540K Cabriolet B

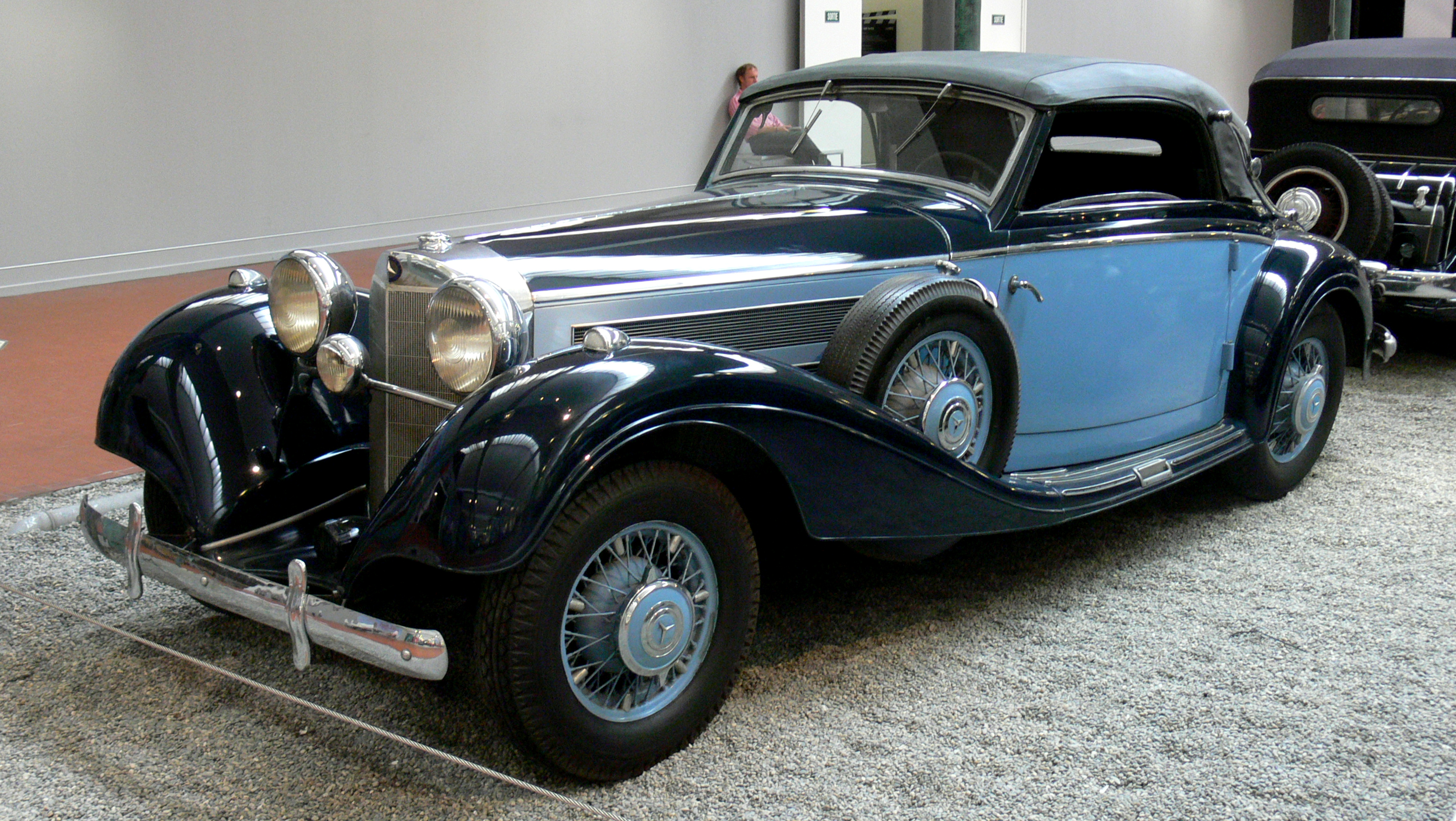
1938 Mercedes-Benz 540K Cabriolet in the Cité de l'Automobile, Mulhouse, France

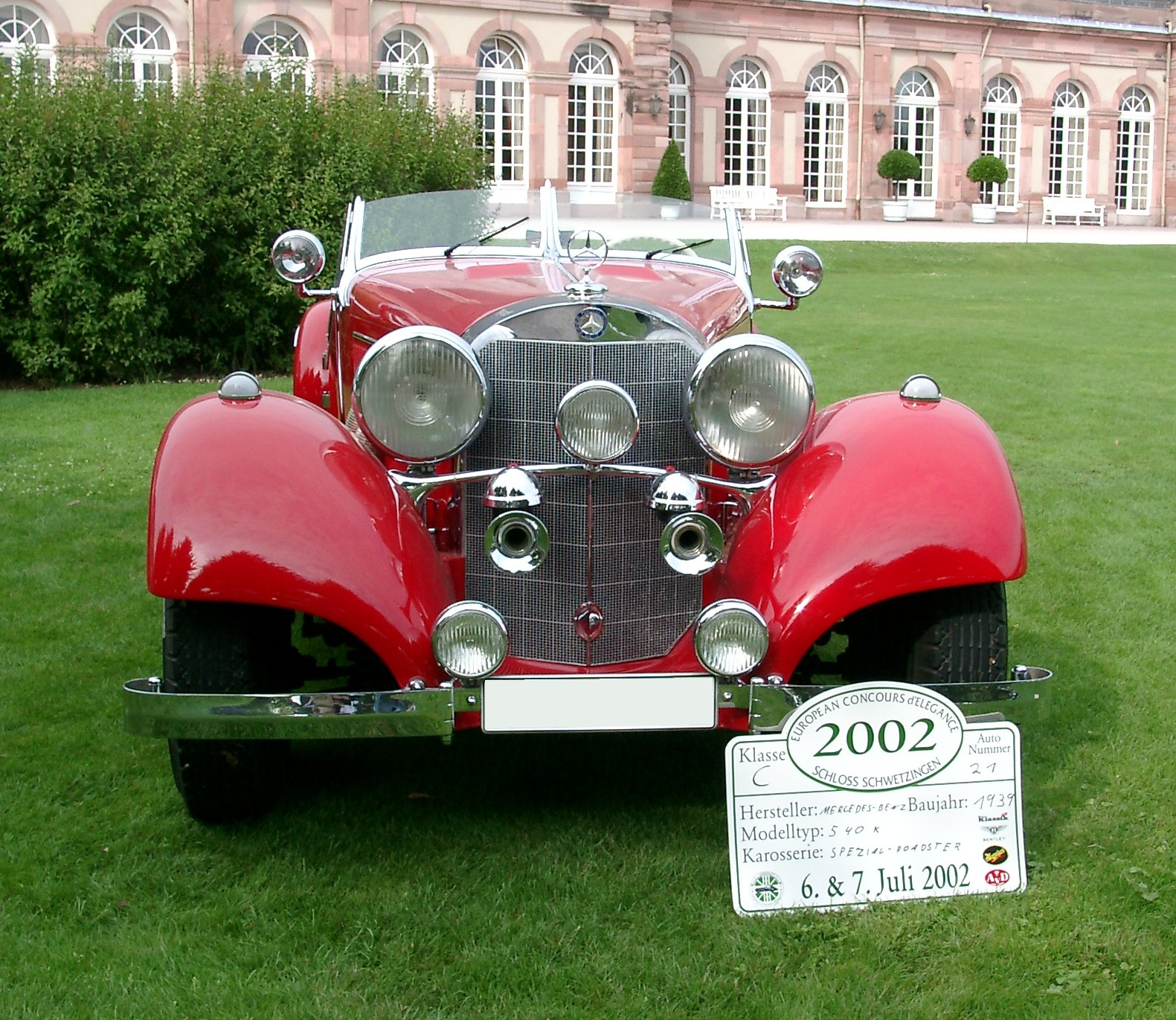
1939 Mercedes-Benz 540K Special Roadster

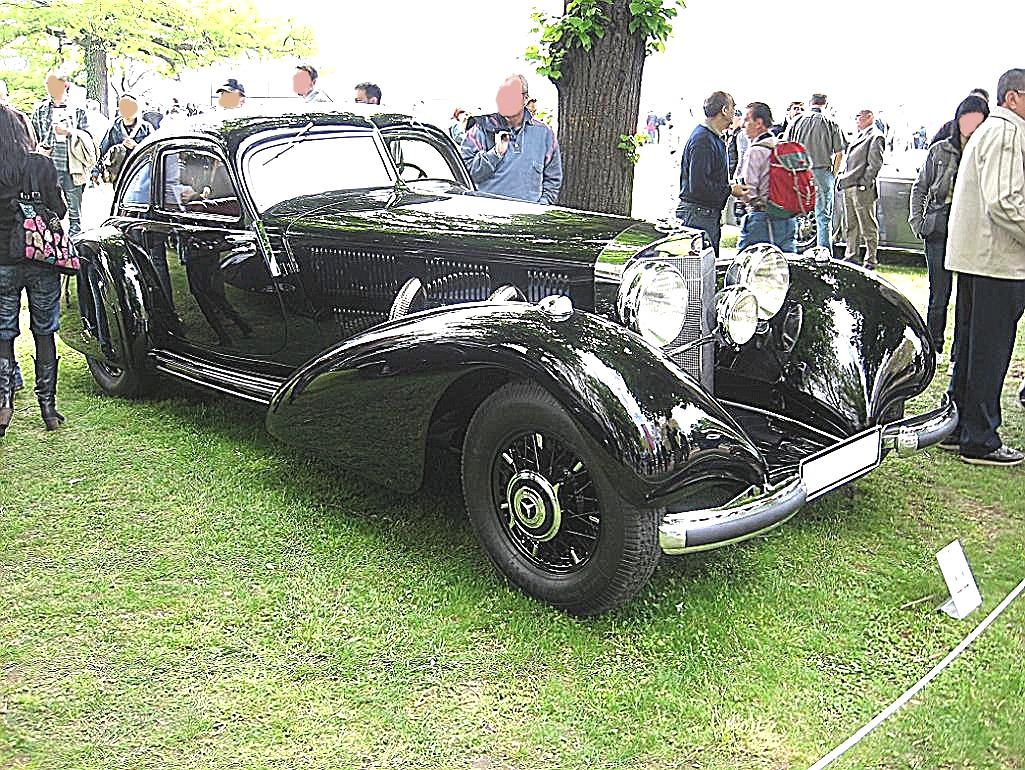
Mercedes-Benz 540K Autobahn-kurier

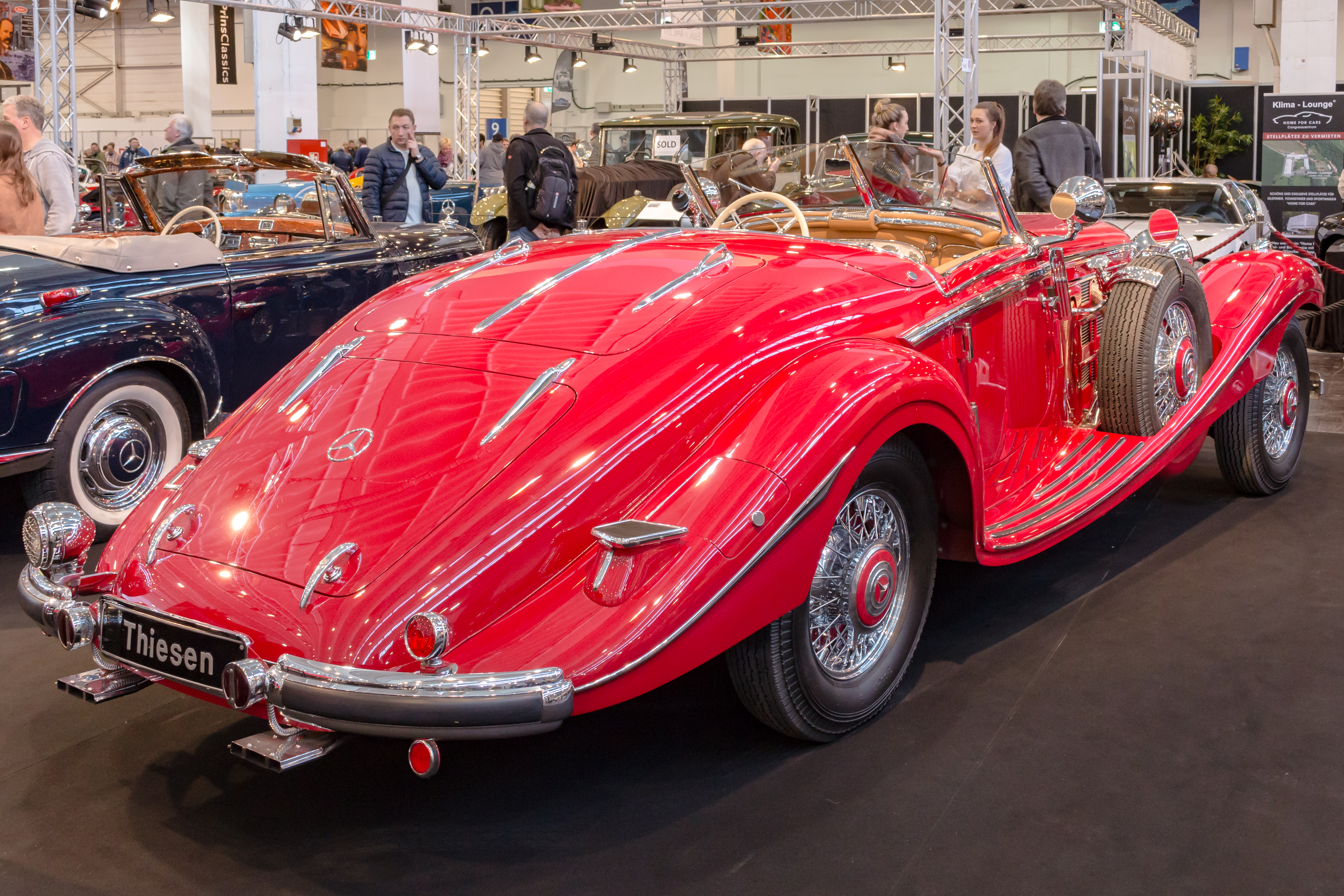
540K Spezialroadster from 1937 (one of two with fender mounted spare wheels)
