= Mercedes-Benz 380 (1933) =

Mercedes-Benz W22
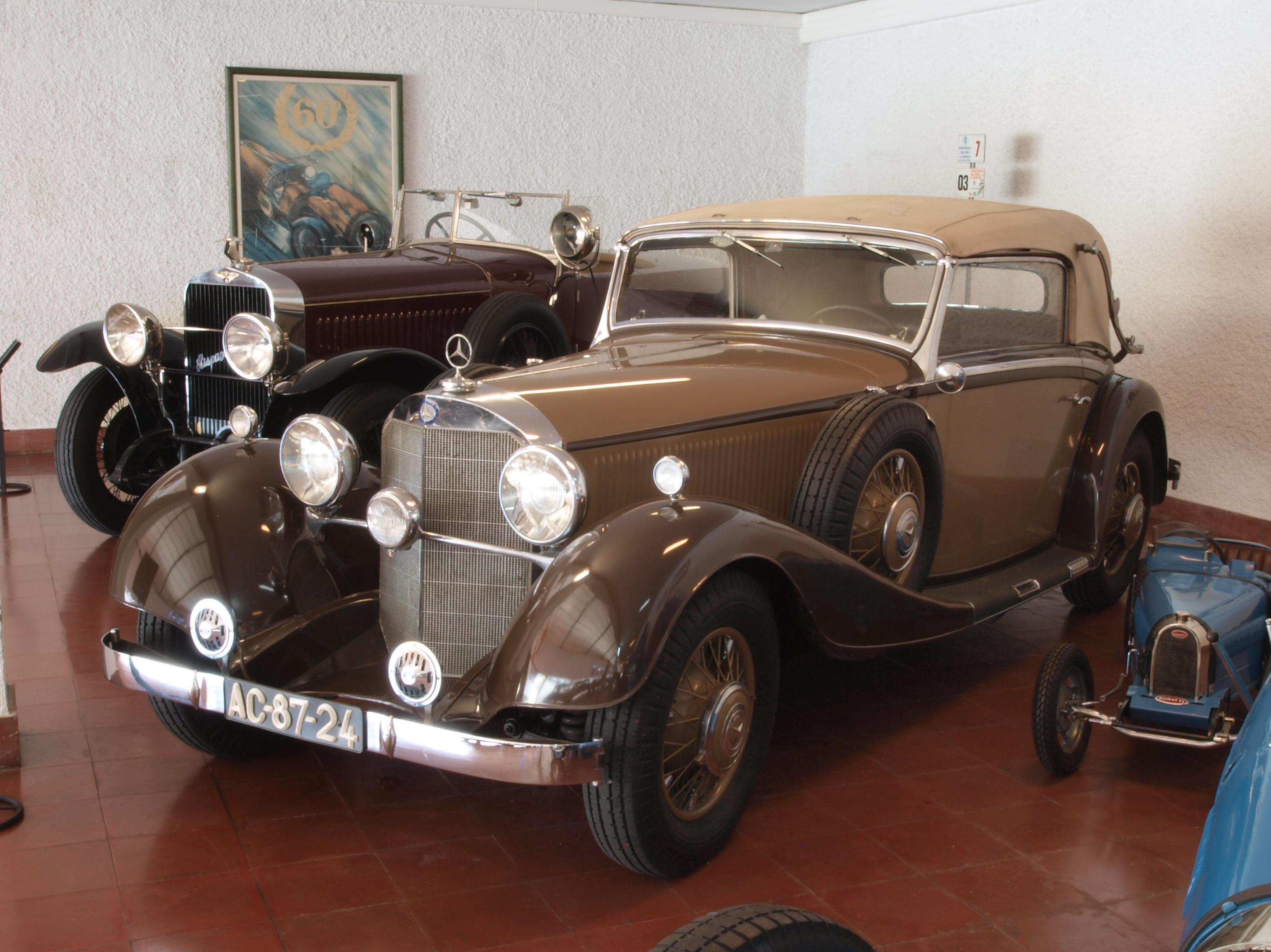
- Mercedes-Benz 380 "Cabriolet C" (1934)

Overview
- Manufacturer: Mercedes-Benz
- Also called: Mercedes-Benz Typ 380; Mercedes-Benz 15/90 PS; Mercedes-Benz 15/120 PS; Mercedes-Benz 15/140 PS
- Production: 1933–1934; 154 units
- Assembly: Germany: Stuttgart

Body and chassis
- Class: Large luxury car
- Body style: Torpedo bodied 2 door “Tourenwagen”; 4 door "Limousine" (sedan/saloon); Roadster; 2 door Cabriolets (various); Also listed in bare chassis form
- Layout: FR layout

Powertrain
- Engine: 3,820 cc Inline-eight engine without or with "Kompressor" (Supercharger); 90 PS (66 kW; 89 hp), 120 PS (88 kW; 118 hp) or 140 PS (103 kW; 138 hp)

Dimensions
- Wheelbase: 3,140 mm (124 in)
- Length: 4,690 mm (185 in)
- Width: 1,730 mm (68 in)
- Height: 1,620 mm (64 in)

The Mercedes-Benz 380 (Type W22) is an eight-cylinder powered automobile introduced by the German manufacturer Mercedes-Benz at the Berlin Motor Show in February 1933. It was withdrawn from production during 1934. Several models with similar names were produced by Mercedes-Benz during the 1930s (and again in the 1980s), so that in retrospect the car is frequently identified using the manufacturer's Works Number as the W22. (The car is sometimes referred to as the 380 K, presumably because of the Kompressor (supercharger) fitted on the faster cars, but this designation was never officially used by the manufacturer.)

In 1933, the 380 sports tourer was one of the most advanced cars on the market, and was duly admired although in the end, with only 154 produced over two years, it proved in some respects a resounding failure.

== Engines ==
The engines started out as the 3,820 cc (233 cu in) straight-eight from the car's predecessor, but the side-valves in the earlier car were now replaced by overhead valves. A new two-barrel carburetor was also fitted. More newsworthy was the availability of a Kompressor, which instantly established the car's credentials as technologically advanced, in common with other luxury cars of the period, such as the Duesenberg SJ.

The least powerful version carried the engine code "M22". It came without a compressor and provided a listed maximum output of 90 PS (66 kW; 89 hp) at 3,200 rpm. This supported a claimed top speed of 120 km/h (75 mph).

Adding a supercharger raised the maximum output to 120 PS (88 kW; 118 hp) at 3,400 rpm and top speed to 130 km/h (81 mph).

The car was also available with an "Integrated Kompressor" (mit integriertem Kompressor) which changed the engine code to "M22K" and further raised the maximum power to 140 PS (103 kW; 138 hp), now at 3,600 rpm. Top speed was 135 km/h (84 mph) or 145 km/h (90 mph), depending on the final drive ratio fitted.

== Running gear ==
This was the first Mercedes-Benz to use an independent suspension setup, with a double wishbone front axle, double-joint swing axle at the rear, and separate wheel location, coil springs and damping.

The W22 series had a four-speed manual gearbox with synchromesh on the top two ratios. The brakes operated on all four wheels via a hydraulic control mechanism. The headlights were manufactured by Carl Zeiss and sit each side of the radiator grille, set behind the chrome Rudge Whitworth wire wheels.

== Bodies ==
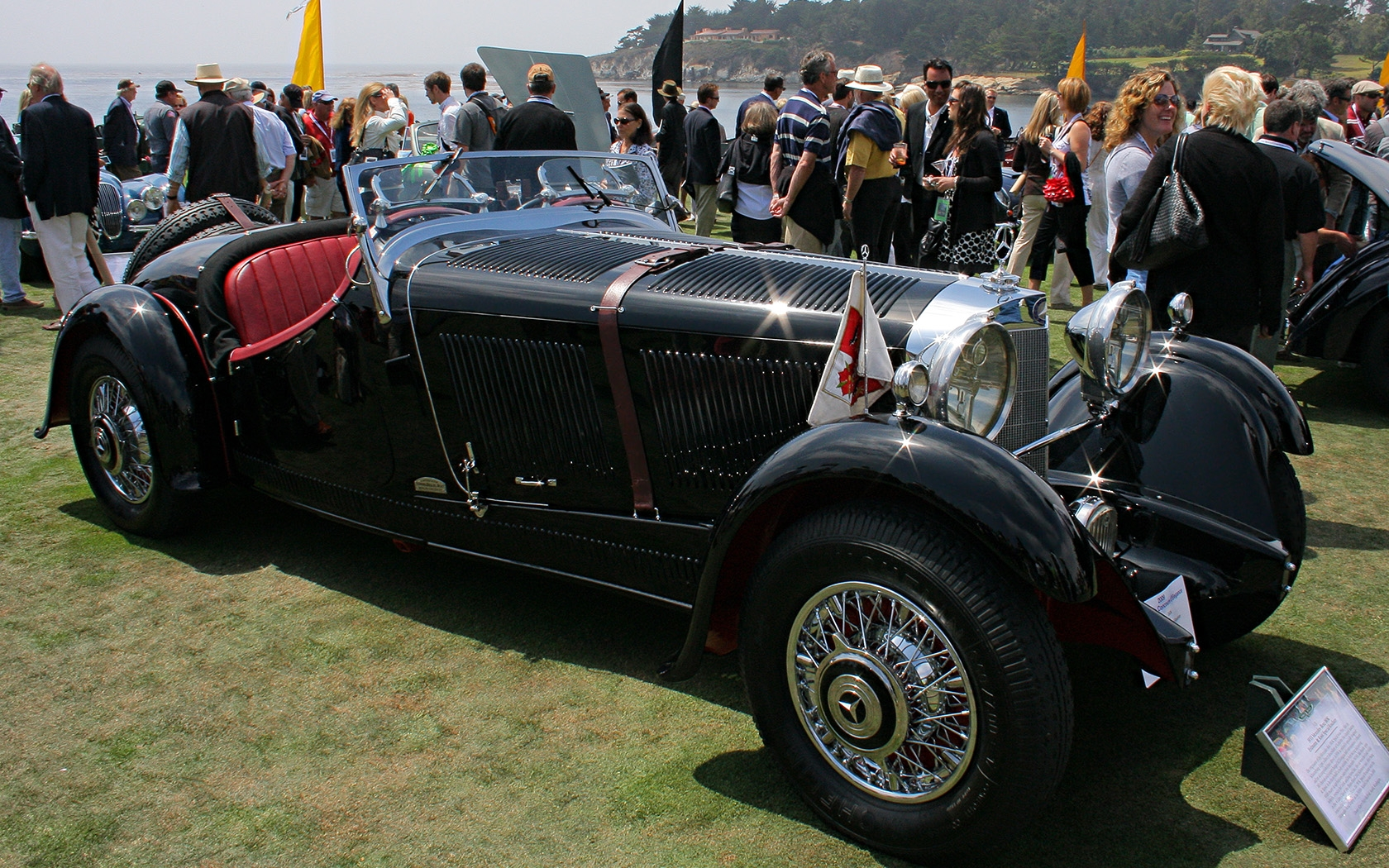
1933 Mercedes-Benz 380K Sport Roadster by Erdmann & Rossi

In bare chassis form the listed price of the W22 was 13,000 Marks and many buyers will have chosen to buy a car body separately from a bespoke coach builder. Cars using any one of the six standard Mercedes-Benz bodies were all listed at 19,500 Marks. A four-door "Limousine" (sedan/saloon) body was offered along with a traditional Torpedo bodied 2 door “Tourenwagen”. There was a "Sport-Roadster" and three different cabriolet bodied cars, designated the "Cabriolet A", the "Cabriolet B" and the "Cabriolet C". The principal differences involved the number of seats (2 or 4) and the number of side windows (2 or 4).

== Commercial ==
The Mercedes-Benz W22 was widely admired for its advanced high-performance engine, for its sophisticated independent suspension and for the stylish elegance of the bodies. Its handling characteristics were infinitely superior to those of high powered cars from competitor manufacturers who were still using rigid axle based suspension configurations. However, this led to calls for still more raw speed, and in 1934 the 380/W22 was replaced by the 500K (W29) a slightly larger car with a significantly larger engine and, where a Kompressor was specified, 160 PS (118 kW; 158 hp) of power. After less than two years, production of the Typ 380 ceased, with 154 built. Just seven were lightweight, open, two-seat sporting roadsters bodied by Mercedes-Benz's own Sindelfingen coachworks.

== Models ==
- 380
- 380S
- 380SS
- 380SSK
- 380SSKL
- 380K (Kompressor)
- 380 Roadster
