= List of Mercedes-Benz engines =

Mercedes-Benz is a German automotive brand that was formed with the merger of Benz & Cie., the world's oldest car company, and Daimler Motoren Gesellschaft in 1926. It is part of the Mercedes-Benz Group AG, a German car manufacturing company. It has produced a range of petrol, diesel, and natural gas engines. This is a list of all internal combustion engine models manufactured.

== Petrol engines ==
=== Straight-three ===
- M160, 0.6 – 0.7 L (1998–2007)
- M134, 1.1 L (2004-2006)
- M132, 1.0 L (2007-2015)
- M281, 0.9 – 1.0 L (2014–present)

=== Flat-four ===
- M144, 1.3 L (1936–1937, prototype)

=== Straight-four ===
- M14, 1.3 L (1928, prototype)
- M23, 1.3 L (1933–1936)
- M30, 1.5 L (1934–1939)
- M28, 1.7 L (1935–1939)
- M136, 1.7 – 1.8 L (1935–1955)
- M149, 2.0 L (1938–1939)
- M121, 1.9 – 2.0 L (1955–1968)
- M118, 1.5 – 1.8 L (1965–1972)
- M115, 2.0 – 2.3 L (1968–1985)
- M102, 1.8 – 2.5 L (1980–1996)
- M111, 1.8 – 2.3 L (1992–2006)
- M166, 1.4 – 2.1 L (1997–2005)
- M271, 1.6 – 1.8 L (2002–2015)
- M266, 1.5 – 2.0 L (2004–2012)
- М135 1.3 – 1.6 L (2004–2010)
- M270, 1.6 – 2.0 L (2011–present)
- M200, 1.2 L (2012–present)
- M274, 1.6 – 2.0 L (2012–present)
- M133, 2.0 L (2013–2019)
- M260/M264, 1.5 – 2.0 L (2017–present)
- M139, 2.0 L (2019–present)
- M282, 1.3 L (2018–present)
- M254, 2.0 L (2021–present)

=== Flat-six ===
- M145, 1.9 L (1936–1937, prototype)

=== Straight-six ===
- M836, 3.9 – 4.0 L (1924–1929)
- M9456, 6.3 L (1924–1929)
- M01, 1.4 L (1926, prototype)
- M02, 2.0 L (1926–1933)
- M03, 3.0 L (1926–1927)
- M04, 3.0 – 3.1 L (1927–1928)
- M09, 3.4 L (1928–1929)
- M06, 6.8 – 7.1 L (1928–1934)
- M10, 3.5 L (1929–1933)
- M11, 2.6 L (1929–1935)
- M15, 1.7 L (1931–1936)
- M18, 2.9 L (1933–1937)
- M21, 2.0 L (1933–1936)
- M143, 2.2 L (1936–1941)
- M142, 3.2 L (1937–1942)
- M153, 2.3 L (1939–1943)
- M159, 2.6 L (1940, prototype)
- M180, 2.2 – 2.3 L (1951–1980)
- M186, 3.0 L (1951–1958)
- M188, 3.0 L (1952–1958)
- M194, 3.0 L (1952, non production; Sportscar racing engine)
- M198, 3.0 L (1954–1963)
- M199, 3.0 L (1955–1958)
- M127, 2.2 L (1958–1964)
- M189, 3.0 L (1958–1967)
- M129, 2.5 L (1965–1967)
- M108, 2.5 L (1965–1967)
- M130, 2.8 L (1968–1972)
- M114, 2.5 L (1967–1972)
- M123, 2.5 L (1976–1985)
- M110, 2.8 L (1972–1986)
- M103, 2.6 – 3.0 L (1984–1995)
- M104, 2.8 – 3.2 – 3.6 L (1989–1997)
- M256, 3.0 L (2017–present)

=== V6 ===
- M106, 2.5 L (1994–1996; non-production - prototype DTM racing engine)
- M112, 2.4 – 3.7 L (1997–2005)
- M272, 2.5 – 3.5 L (2004–2017)
- M276, 2.8 – 3.5 L (2010–2023)
- Mercedes-Benz turbo-hybrid V6 F1 engine 1.6 L (2014–present)

=== Flat-eight ===
- M146, 2.5 L (1936-1937, prototype)

=== Straight-eight ===
- M08, 4.6 – 5.0 L (1928–1940)
- M07, 7.7 L (1930–1938)
- M19, 3.8 L (1932–1933)
- M22, 3.8 – 4.0 L (1933–1934)
- M25 / M125 3.4 – 5.7 L (1934–1939; non-production – Grand Prix racing engine)
- M24, 5.0 – 5.4 L (1934–1944)
- M150, 7.7 L (1938–1944)
- M124, 5.8 L (1939, prototype)
- M196 2.5 – 3.0 L (1954–1955; non-production – Formula 1 engine)

=== V8 ===
- M147, 4.0 L (1938, prototype)
- M100, 6.3 – 6.8 L (1963–1981)
- M116, 3.5 – 4.2 L (1969–1991)
- M117, 4.5 – 5.6 L (1971–1992)
- M119, 4.2 – 6.0 L (1989–1999)
- 500I, 3.43 L (1994; non-production – Indy car racing engine)
- IC108, 2.65 – 3.43 L (1995–2000; non-production – Indy car racing engine)
- M113, 4.3 – 5.5 L (1997–2012)
- M155, 5.4 L (2004–2009)
- M273, 4.7 – 5.5 L (2005–2010)
- FO, 2.4 L (2006–2013; non-production – Formula One racing engine)
- M156, 6.2 L (2006–2014)
- M159, 6.2 L (2009–2014)
- M278, 4.7 L (2010–2020)
- M157, 5.5 L (2010–2019)
- M152, 5.5 L (2012–2015)
- M176/M177/M178, 4.0 L (2014–present)

=== V10 ===
- FO, 3.0 – 3.5 L (1994–2005; non-production – racing engine)

=== Flat-twelve ===
- M291, 3.5 L (1991–1992; non-production – Group C racing engine)

=== V12 ===
- M154 / M163 3.0 – 4.7 L (1934–1939; non-production – Grand Prix racing engine)
- M148, 6.0 L (1941–1942, prototype)
- M157, 6.0 L (1941–1942, prototype)
- MB503 42.4 – 44.5 L (1937-1939, prototype)
- MB509, 44.0 L (used in Panzer VIII Maus V1)
- M120, 6.0 – 7.3 L (1991–1998)
- M297, 6.9 – 7.3 L (1997–2016)
- M137, 5.8 – 6.3 L (1998–2002)
- M275, 5.5 — 6.0 L (2002—2013)
- M285, 5.5 L (2002–2013)
- M277, 6.0 L (2012–present)
- M279, 6.0 L (2012–present)
- M158, 5.5 – 6.0 L (2012–present)

=== Wankel ===
- M950, 3.6 – 4.8 L (1969–1970)

== Diesel engines for passenger cars ==
=== Straight-two ===
- OM632, 0.8 L

=== Straight-three ===
- OM660, 0.8 L (1998–2015)
- OM639, 1.5 L (2004–2009)

=== Straight-four ===
- OM138, 2.5 L (1935–1940)
- OM636, 1.7 – 1.8 L (1949–1990)
- OM621, 1.9 – 2.0 L (1959–1967)
- OM615, 2.0 – 2.2 L (1968–1985)
- OM616, 2.4 L (1973–1985)
- OM601, 2.0 – 2.3 L (1983–2001)
- OM604, 2.0 – 2.2 L (1993–1998)
- OM668, 1.7 L (1997–2005)
- OM611, 2.1 – 2.2 L (1998–2006)
- OM646, 2.1 L (2002–2010)
- OM640, 2.0 L (2004–2012)
- OM651, 1.8 – 2.1 L (2008–present)
- OM622/OM626, 1.6 L (2014–2018)
- OM654, 2.0 L (2016–present)
- OM664 (Ssangyong D20DT engine), 2.0 L (2005–2012)
- OM699, 2.3 L (2017–2020)
- OM607, 1.5 L (2012–present)
- OM608, 1.5 L (2018–present)

=== Straight-five ===
- OM617, 3.0 L (1974–1991)
- OM602, 2.5 – 2.9 L (1985–2002)
- OM605, 2.5 L (1993–2001)
- OM612, 2.7 – 3.0 L (1999–2006)
- OM665, 2.7 L (2001–2014) (Licensed version of OM612 engine for (WJ) Jeep Grand Cherokee (OM665.921 2.7 CRD engine) and for some models of SsangYong (D27DT/OM665.9xx 2.7 XDI engine))
- OM647, 2.7 L (2004–2006)

=== Straight-six ===
- OM603, 3.0 – 3.5 L (1986–1997)
- OM606, 3.0 L (1993–2001)
- OM613, 3.2 L (1999–2003)
- OM648, 3.2 L (2002–2006)
- OM656, 2.9 – 3.0 L (2017–present)

=== V6 ===
- OM642, 3.0 L (2005–present)

=== V8 ===
- OM628, 4.0 L (1999–2005)
- OM629, 4.0 L (2005–2010)

== Diesel engines for buses and trucks ==
=== One-cylinder ===
- MB851, 1.5 L
- MB861, 1.5 L

=== Straight-two ===
- MB852, 2.9 L
- MB862, 2.9 L
- M202B, 6.5 L (1947–???)

=== Straight-three ===
- MB853, 4.3 L
- M203B, 9.7 L (1947–???)
- MB863, 4.3 L (1954–???)

=== Straight-four ===
- OM59 3.8 L (1933)
- OM314 engine 3.8 L (1967–1986)
- OM364, 4.0 L (1983–1999/2000)
- OM904, 4.2 L (1996–present)
- OM924, 4.8 L (2004–present)
- OM934, 5.1 L (2013–present)

=== Straight-six ===
- OM5, 8.6 L (1928–1932)
- OM49
- OM54, 12.5 L (1934–1939)
- OM57, 11.3 – 12.5 L (1938–1940)
- OM65
- OM67, 7.2 – 7.4 L (1935–1954)
- OM77
- OM79, 10.3 L (1932–1936)
- OM302, 4.6 L (1941) (prototype)
- OM312, 4.6 L (1949)
- OM315, 8.2 L
- OM321, 5.1 L
- OM322, 5.7 L
- OM326, 10.8 L
- OM346, 10.8 L
- OM352, 5.7 L (1963–present)
- OM355, 11.6 L
- OM360, 8.7 L
- OM366, 6.0 L (1984–present)
- OM407 11.4 L
- OM427 12.0 L
- OM447 12.0 L
- OM457, 12.0 L (2003–present)
- OM460 12.8 L
- OM470, 10.7 L
- OM471, 12.8 L
- OM472, 14.8 L
- OM473, 15.6 L (2012–present)
- OM906, 6.4 L (1998–present)
- OM926, 7.2 L (2000–present)
- OM936, 7.6 L (2013–present)

=== V6 ===
- OM401, 9.6L
- OM421, 11.0 L (1982–1995)
- OM441 (1978–present) (used in Hyundai KR111/RM114)
- OM501, 12.0 L

=== V8 ===
- OM402 12.8 L
- OM422 14.6 L
- OM442 14.6 L – 15.1 L
- OM502 16.0 L

=== V10 ===
- OM403 16.0 L
- OM423 18.3 L
- OM443 18.3 L – 18.8 L
- OM503

=== V12 ===
- OM404, 20.9 L
- OM424 22.0 L
- OM444, 22.6 L

== Diesel engines for other applications ==
=== V12 ===
- OM504
- MB500, 66.4 L (used in e-boats)
- MB507, 42.4 – 44.5 L
- MB512
- MB517, 42.4 L (used in Panzer VIII Maus V2)
- MB820
- MB835

=== V16 ===
- MB602
- MB512
- MB839, 104.3 L

=== V20 ===
- MB501
- MB511
- MB518, 134.4 L (1951–1973)

== Natural gas engines ==
- M366 (CNG), 6.0 L
- M407 (LPG)
- M447 (CNG), 12.0 L
- M906 (CNG), 6.9 L
- M936G (CNG), 7.7 L
- OM924, 4.8 L
- OM926 (CNG), 7.2 L
