= Mercedes-Benz M08 engine =

Mercedes-Benz M08

Overview
- Manufacturer: Mercedes-Benz
- Production: 1928-1940

Layout
- Configuration: Straight-eight
- Displacement: 4.6–5.0 L (281–305 cu in)
- Cylinder bore: 80–82.5 mm (3.1–3.2 in)
- Piston stroke: 115 mm (4.5 in)
- Valvetrain: 16-valve, DOHC, two-valves per cylinder
- Compression ratio: 5.0:1-6.6:1

Combustion
- Supercharger: Naturally aspirated Roots-type supercharger
- Fuel system: Carburetor
- Fuel type: Gasoline
- Oil system: Dry sump

Output
- Power output: 79–110 hp (59–82 kW)
- Torque output: 175–190 lb⋅ft (237–258 N⋅m)

Chronology
- Successor: Mercedes-Benz M19 engine Mercedes-Benz M07 engine

The Mercedes-Benz M08 engine is a naturally-aspirated and supercharged, 4.6-liter and 5.0-liter, straight-8 engine, designed, developed and produced by Mercedes-Benz; between 1928 and 1940.

== Overview ==
=== Typ Nürburg 460 engine (1928–1929) ===
The engine was a 4,622cc straight-8 side-valve unit for which maximum output was given as 80 PS (59 kW; 79 hp) at 3,400 rpm

=== Typ Nürburg 460 engine (1929–1932) ===
For 1929, the company's first eight-cylinder model was extensively reworked by the newly appointed Technical Director Hans Nibel. The 8-cylinder engine and most other technical details were carried over unchanged from the 1928 car including the ratios chosen for the four-speed manual transmission.

=== Typ Nürburg 500 engine (1931–1933) ===
In 1931, the car became available with an enlarged 4,918cc engine which now also featured a twin downdraft carburettor. Maximum output was now listed as 100 PS (74 kW; 99 hp) at 3,100 rpm and claimed top speed increased to 110 km/h (69 mph).

=== Typ 500 engine (1932–1936) ===
In 1932 the W08 lost the “Nürburg” name, being sold simply as the Mercedes-Benz Typ 500. The 4,918cc 100 PS (74 kW; 99 hp) side-valve engine with its twin downdraft carburetor was unchanged, as were the four-speed optional overdrive transmission, wheelbase, and list of standard body types.

=== Typ 500 engine (1936–1939) ===
1936 saw an increase in claimed maximum output from the engine to 110 PS (81 kW; 108 hp) at 3,300 rpm. The cylinder capacity at 4,918cc was unchanged, but there was a marginal raising of the compression ratio. The claimed top speed was now raised further to 123 km/h (76 mph). The model was discontinued in 1939 without any immediate successor. Twenty-four years passed before the next 8-cylinder engined Mercedes-Benz appeared; with the Mercedes-Benz 600, in 1963.

== Applications ==
- Mercedes-Benz Nürburg 460 (W08)
