= Panzer VII Löwe =

German super-heavy tank project

Panzerkampfwagen VII Löwe (VK 70.01)
- Drawing of one of the designs for the Löwe
- Type: Super-heavy tank
- Place of origin: Nazi Germany

Production history
- Designer: Krupp
- Designed: 1 November 1941 – 20 July 1942

Specifications
- Mass: 72–100 t (71–98 long tons; 79–110 short tons)
- Crew: 5 (driver, commander, gunner, loader, radio operator) or 6(extra loader)
- Armor: Frontal: 100–120 mm (3.9–4.7 in); Side: 80–100 mm (3.1–3.9 in); Roof: 40 mm (1.6 in); Deck: 40 mm (1.6 in); Floor: 30 mm (1.2 in)
- Main armament: 10.5 cm (4.1 in) KwK L/70; 12.8 cm (5.0 in) KwK L/35 or L/50; 15 cm (5.9 in) KwK L/35 or L/37 or L/40; 8.8 cm (3.5 in) KwK 43 L/71
- Secondary armament: 1xMG-34 or MG-42
- Engine: Daimler-Benz MB507 800 hp (600 kW) or 1,000 hp (750 kW); Maybach HL230 800 hp (600 kW); Maybach Petrol Engine 1,000 hp (750 kW); 2 Porsche Diesel Engines 840 hp (630 kW) total
- Suspension: Torsion bar
- Maximum speed: 23–35 km/h (14–22 mph)

The Panzerkampfwagen VII Löwe (Lion), initially known as project VK 70.01, was a series of designs for a super-heavy tank developed by Krupp from 1941 to 1942. The project would be cancelled in favour of even heavier tanks such as the Maus.

The project was only officially known as VK 70.01 or Panzerkampfwagen Löwe, with the names Panzerkampfwagen VII and VK 72.01 appearing inconsistently in various documents but never officially recognised.

== Development ==
The parameters for the tank project VK 70.01 were first discussed in October 1941 between Krupp and Wa Prüf 6, the Waffenamt’s development and testing office for armoured vehicles and motorized equipment, with the formal requirements ready by 1 November. It would have a combat weight of 73 t (72 long tons; 80 short tons), have 140 mm (5.5 in) of frontal armour and 100 mm (3.9 in) of side armour, and a 3-man turret with a total crew of 5. It was to be powered by the Daimler-Benz MB507, a Schnellboot engine producing, depending on its version, 800 hp (600 kW) at 2200 RPM or 1,000 hp (750 kW) at 2400 rpm. A top speed of 40 km/h (25 mph) or 43.6 km/h (27.1 mph) was expected. The armament was not specified, apart from a required traverse of +20/-10 vertically and 360 degrees horizontally. A weight limit of 90 t (89 long tons; 99 short tons), set by railroad restrictions, was applied on 17 December.

The first design was presented to Wa Prüf 6 on 21 January 1942. Designated W 1648, it weighed 82 t (81 long tons; 90 short tons), had decreased frontal armour to 120 mm (4.7 in), a lower top speed of 35 km/h (22 mph). For its armament, Krupp proposed a 105 mm L/70 gun. A central turret arrangement was also agreed upon. The Maybach HL230, an 800 hp (600 kW) petrol engine, supposed to enter production in January 1943, was also selected.

During a conference with Hitler on 23 January, the proposal was approved, though further discussion regarding the powertrain took place, with the suitability of Porsche’s Diesel–electric powertrain to be reviewed. Hitler also indicated his preference for a large-calibre gun, ordering that different turrets be built: one that mounted a 105 or 128 mm gun, and another for a 150 mm gun.

To this latter requirement, following further discussion with Wa Prüf 6, Krupp was to build two identical hulls, plus a turret for the 105 mm gun and another for the 150 mm gun. The latter turret was to allow for a maximum elevation of 35 to 40 degrees, accommodating the indirect fire role.

On 23 February, triggered by fears of heavier Soviet armour, two lighter 72-tonne prototype vehicles, with the same armour (100 mm front, 80 mm sides) and powertrain as the Tiger I, were to be constructed. These vehicles were to be then entered into series production without testing. The crew was also increased to 6. The requirements for these vehicles were finalised on 5 March, with Krupp awarded a contract to produce the two vehicles, one of which would omit a turret and mount a test weight instead. VK 70.01 would be officially renamed to Panzerkampfwagen Löwe in March.

During another conference, Hitler ordered that a 100-tonne tank be developed instead. Porsche would receive contracts to independently design their own 100-tonne tank, while through April and May Krupp continued creating further designs ranging from 80 to 90 tonnes, including at least one rear-turreted design. Again, Krupp was to deliver two prototypes, one with a turret, and the other without but with a weight.

Further deliberation on the VK 70.01’s main armament continued, with Krupp’s favoured 105 mm still being regarded as insufficiently powerful. A turret with longer 128 mm L/35 and 150 mm L/40 turrets would be proposed, with the 1.6 m (5 ft 3 in)-long single-piece ammunition for the latter requiring a large overhang over the rear of the turret.

However, due to ever-increasing demands from Hitler for heavier tanks, the contracts for the prototypes would be cancelled by Wa Prüf 6 on 18 May, with the Löwe project officially abandoned by 7 June. Further design work continued at Krupp, until work on the Löwe turret was ordered to stop on 20 July 1942, with Krupp instead ordered to begin work on a turret that would evolve into the Maus.

== Design ==
Design specifications for the VK 70.01 project changed throughout its developmental history. Primary armament would’ve been either a 105, 128, or 150 mm gun, while armour ranged from 100–120 mm (3.9–4.7 in) frontally and 80–100 mm (3.1–3.9 in) on the sides.

Powertrains varied from the original 800 hp (600 kW) HL230, to a proposed 1,000 hp (750 kW) Maybach petrol engine, planned for the heavier designs, with a pair of Porsche diesel engines also considered.

The only extant design blueprint, W 1661, dated 7 April 1942, shows a 90-ton tank armed with the 105 mm L/70 gun, the originally-proposed armour requirements (120 mm front, 100 mm sides), and the 800 hp HL230, with a top speed of 23 km/h (14 mph).

== See also ==
- Panther
- Tiger I
- Tiger II
- Maus, the continuation of the German super-heavy tank program.
- P. 1000 Ratte, another design for a German super-heavy tank that never left the drawing board.

=== Tanks of comparable role, performance and era ===
- Soviet IS-3
- American M103
- British Conqueror
- French AMX-50
- German Panzer VIII Maus
