= Mercedes-Benz M11 engine =

Mercedes-Benz M11

Overview
- Manufacturer: Mercedes-Benz
- Production: 1929-1935

Layout
- Configuration: Inline-6
- Displacement: 2.6 L (159 cu in)
- Cylinder bore: 74 mm (2.9 in)
- Piston stroke: 100 mm (3.9 in)
- Valvetrain: 12-valve, SOHC, two-valves per cylinder
- Compression ratio: 5.0:1

Combustion
- Fuel system: Carburetor
- Fuel type: Gasoline
- Oil system: Dry sump

Output
- Power output: 50 hp (37 kW)
- Torque output: 100 lb⋅ft (136 N⋅m)

Chronology
- Successor: Mercedes-Benz M18 engine; Mercedes-Benz M143 engine

The Mercedes-Benz M11 engine is a naturally-aspirated, 2.6-liter, straight-6, internal combustion piston engine, designed, developed and produced by Mercedes-Benz; between 1929 and 1935.

== M11 Engine ==
The manufacturer applied the widely followed German naming conventions of the time. On the Mercedes-Benz 10/50 PS the “10” defined the car's tax horsepower, used by the authorities to determine the level of annual car tax to be imposed on car owners. The “38” defined the manufacturer's claims regarding car's actual power output as defined in metric horsepower. In Germany tax horsepower, which had been defined by statute since 1906, was based on the dimensions of the cylinders in the engine.

Unlike the systems used elsewhere in Europe, the German tax horsepower calculation took account both of the cylinder bore and of the cylinder stroke, and there was therefore a direct linear relationship between engine size and tax horsepower. Reflecting the manufacturer's new naming strategy, the car was also sold as the Mercedes-Benz Typ Stuttgart, the Mercedes-Benz Typ 260 and as the Mercedes-Benz Typ Stuttgart 260.

The side-valve six-cylinder 2,581 cc engine delivered a maximum output of 50 PS (37 kW; 49 hp) at 3,400 rpm which translated into a top speed of 90 km/h (56 mph). Power was transmitted to the rear wheels via a four-speed manual transmission, the fourth speed being effectively an overdrive ratio of 1 : 0.76 while the more conventional “top” 1 : 1 ratio was achieved by selecting third gear. The wheels were fixed to a rigid axle suspended from semi-elliptic leaf springs. The braking applied to all four wheels, mechanically controlled using rod linkages.

== Applications ==
- Mercedes-Benz W11
