= Mercedes-Benz 230 =

Mercedes-Benz has sold a number of automobiles with the "230" model name:

- 1937–1941 W143
  - 1937–1941 Typ 230 n / 230
- 1963–1966 W113
  - 1963–1966 230SL
- 1965–1968 W110
  - 1965–1968 230
- 1965–1968 W111
  - 1965–1968 230S
- 1968–1972 W114
  - 1968–1972 230.6
- 1973–1976 W115
  - 1973–1976 230.4
- 1976–1986 W123
  - 1976–1986 230 / 230E / 230C / 230CE / 230T / 230TE
- 1985–1993 W124
  - 1985–1993 230E / 230CE / 230TE
- 1997 R170
  - 1997 SLK230
- 1998 W202
  - 1998 C230
