= Mercedes-Benz M24 engine =

Mercedes-Benz M24

Overview
- Manufacturer: Mercedes-Benz
- Production: 1934-1944

Layout
- Configuration: Straight-eight
- Displacement: 5.0–5.4 L (305–330 cu in)
- Cylinder bore: 86–88 mm (3.4–3.5 in)
- Piston stroke: 108–111 mm (4.3–4.4 in)
- Valvetrain: 16-valve, side-camshaft, two valves per cylinder
- Compression ratio: 5.2:1-5.5:1

Combustion
- Supercharger: Roots-type supercharger
- Fuel system: Carburetor
- Fuel type: Gasoline
- Oil system: Dry sump

Output
- Power output: 100–180 hp 75–134 kW
- Torque output: 318 lb⋅ft 431 N⋅m

Chronology
- Predecessor: Mercedes-Benz M22 engine
- Successor: Mercedes-Benz M150 engine

The Mercedes-Benz M24 is a supercharged 5.0- or 5.4-liter straight-8 engine, designed, developed and produced by Mercedes-Benz from 1934 through 1944.

== Applications ==
- Mercedes-Benz W31
- Mercedes-Benz 500K
- Mercedes-Benz 540K
