= Daimler M836 engine =

Daimler-Mercedes M836

Overview
- Manufacturer: Daimler-Mercedes (Daimler AG)
- Production: 1924-1929

Layout
- Configuration: Inline-6
- Displacement: 3.9–4.0 L (238–244 cu in)
- Cylinder bore: 80 mm (3.1 in)
- Piston stroke: 130 mm (5.1 in)
- Valvetrain: 12-valve, SOHC, two-valves per cylinder
- Compression ratio: 4.7:1

Combustion
- Supercharger: Roots-type supercharger
- Fuel system: Carburetor
- Fuel type: Gasoline
- Oil system: Dry sump

Output
- Power output: 69–99 hp (51–74 kW)
- Torque output: 129–170 lb⋅ft (175–230 N⋅m)

The Daimler-Mercedes M836 engine is a naturally-aspirated and supercharged, 3.9-liter to 4.0-liter, straight-6, internal combustion piston engine, designed, developed and produced by Mercedes-Benz, in partnership with Daimler; between 1924 and 1929.

== M836 engine ==
The six-cylinder in-line 3920 cc engine featured an overhead camshaft which at the time was an unusual feature, with “bevel linkage”. However, it was the switchable supercharger (”Kompressor”), adopted from the company's racing cars, that attracted most of the attention. With the device switched off maximum claimed output was of 70 PS (51 kW; 69 hp) at 3,100 rpm: with the supercharger operating, maximum output rose to 100 PS (74 kW; 99 hp).

The top speed listed was 105 km/h (65 mph) or 112 km/h (70 mph) according to which of the two offered final drive ratios was fitted.

== Applications ==
- Mercedes 15/70/100 PS
