= Mercedes-Benz W153 =

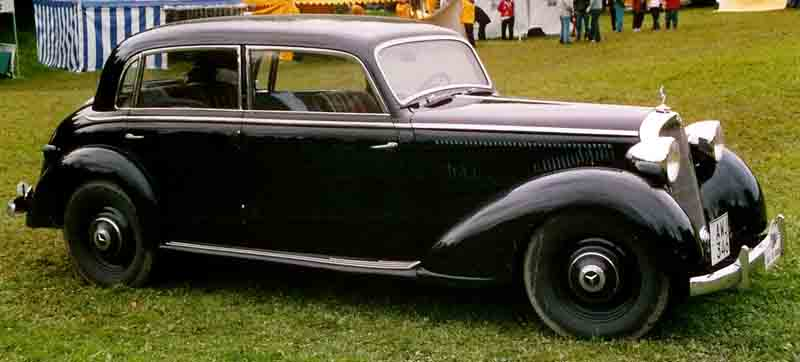
- Mercedes-Benz 230

Overview
- Manufacturer: Mercedes-Benz
- Also called: Mercedes-Benz Typ(e) 230
- Production: 1938–1943; 4,262 units
- Assembly: Germany: Stuttgart; Argentina: Buenos Aires

Body and chassis
- Class: Mid-size luxury car
- Body style: 4-door sedan Cabriolet “A” (2-seats); Cabriolet “B” (2-doors / 4-seats); Cabriolet “D” (4-doors / 4 seats)
- Layout: FR layout

Powertrain
- Engine: 2289cc M153 I6
- Transmission: 4-speed manual

Dimensions
- Wheelbase: 3,050 mm (120 in)
- Length: 4,700 mm (190 in)
- Width: 1,720 mm (68 in)

Chronology
- Predecessor: Mercedes-Benz W143

The Mercedes-Benz W 153 was a luxury six cylinder passenger car built in parallel with the W 143 from 1938, and first presented in public at the Berlin Motor Show early in 1939. It was one of several Mercedes-Benz models known, in its own time, as the Mercedes-Benz 230 (or sometimes, in this case, as the Mercedes-Benz Typ(e) 230).

The car had the same 3,050 mm (120 in) wheelbase as the longer wheelbase versions of the W143 from 1937, but with a completely new and much more modern body as well as a completely new chassis. In place of the earlier car’s pressed steel subframe the W 153 had an x-shaped oval tube subframe. The car had been developed by Hans Gustav Röhr who headed up the company's Passenger Car Development Department for two years prior to his death in August 1937.

== Engines and transmission ==
The engine was derived from the existing unit, but the cylinder bore was increased by one millimeter, which gave rise to an overall increase in engine size to 2289cc. Despite the slightly larger engine size and the inclusion of two twin chamber Solex 30 JFFK carburettors, claimed power was unchanged at 55 PS (40 kW): the compression ratio was set at the relatively low value of 1 : 6.6. Claimed top speed was 116 km/h (72 mph).

The four-speed manual transmission incorporated synchro-mesh on all four forward ratios, and power was delivered to the road via the rear wheels.

== Bodies ==
The fours standard body types were a four-door six light “Limousine” (sedan/saloon) and three different cabriolet bodied cars with two or four seats (Cabriolet “A” and “B”) along with, in the case of the four seat cabriolet, the option of four doors (Cabriolet “D”).

There was no long cabin „Pullman-Limousine“ version of the car, and the large external rear mounted luggage racks that were a feature of the W143 were not repeated on the W153. Instead, the modern streamlined bodywork on all four standard bodied cars incorporated a large rear boot/trunk.

== Impact of war ==
W153s were built until 1943, but only 87 of these emerged from the plant in 1942 and 1943, due to the changed government priorities accompanying the wartime economy. More than half of the 4,264 cars produced dated from 1939.

The W153 body shell returned in 1949, however, little changed but fitted with a smaller engine, as the Mercedes-Benz 170S.

== Mercedes-Benz 230 SV (1938–1939) ==
There were also a two-door fast back Sport-Limousine and an open topped two-door Sport-Roadster. Technically they followed the blue-print of the W153 Sedan/saloon, but being much lighter they were also faster. Only 52 of the Sport models were made, of which the open topped cars accounted for 33.
