= Mercedes-Benz MB517 engine =

Mercedes-Benz MB517

Overview
- Manufacturer: Mercedes-Benz
- Production: 1944

Layout
- Configuration: 60° V12
- Displacement: 42.35 L (2,584 cu in)
- Cylinder bore: 6.22 in (158.0 mm)
- Piston stroke: 7.09 in (180.1 mm)
- Valvetrain: 24-valve, SOHC, two-valves per cylinder
- Compression ratio: 17.0:1

Combustion
- Supercharger: Roots-type supercharger
- Fuel system: Fuel injection
- Fuel type: Diesel
- Oil system: Dry sump
- Cooling system: Water-cooled

Output
- Power output: 1,200–1,375 hp (895–1,025 kW)
- Torque output: 2,520–3,140 lb⋅ft (3,417–4,257 N⋅m)

Dimensions
- Dry weight: 790–920 kg (1,742–2,028 lb)

The Mercedes-Benz MB 517 was a supercharged, four-stroke, V-12 diesel marine engine version of the MB 507; derived from the MB 503 gasoline engine. The MB 507 was also based on the Daimler-Benz DB 603 inverted V-12 aircraft engine, and shared an identical bore, stroke, and displacement. Unlike the gasoline-powered MB 503, the diesel-powered MB 507 did not use a supercharger.

== Applications ==
Panzer VIII Maus V2
