= Mercedes-Benz M10 engine =

Mercedes-Benz M10

Overview
- Manufacturer: Mercedes-Benz
- Production: 1929-1933

Layout
- Configuration: Inline-6
- Displacement: 3.4–3.7 L (207–226 cu in)
- Cylinder bore: 80–82.5 mm (3.1–3.2 in)
- Piston stroke: 115 mm (4.5 in)
- Valvetrain: 12-valve, SOHC, two-valves per cylinder
- Compression ratio: 5.0:1

Combustion
- Fuel system: Carburetor
- Fuel type: Gasoline
- Oil system: Dry sump

Output
- Power output: 70–75 hp (52–56 kW)
- Torque output: 115–123 lb⋅ft (156–167 N⋅m)

Chronology
- Predecessor: Mercedes-Benz M09 engine

The Mercedes-Benz M10 engine is a naturally-aspirated, 3.4-liter to 3.7-liter, straight-6, internal combustion piston engine, designed, developed and produced by Mercedes-Benz; between 1929 and 1933.

== Applications ==
- Mercedes-Benz W10
