= Mercedes-Benz W03 =

Mercedes-Benz Typ 12/55 PS / Typ 300 (W03)
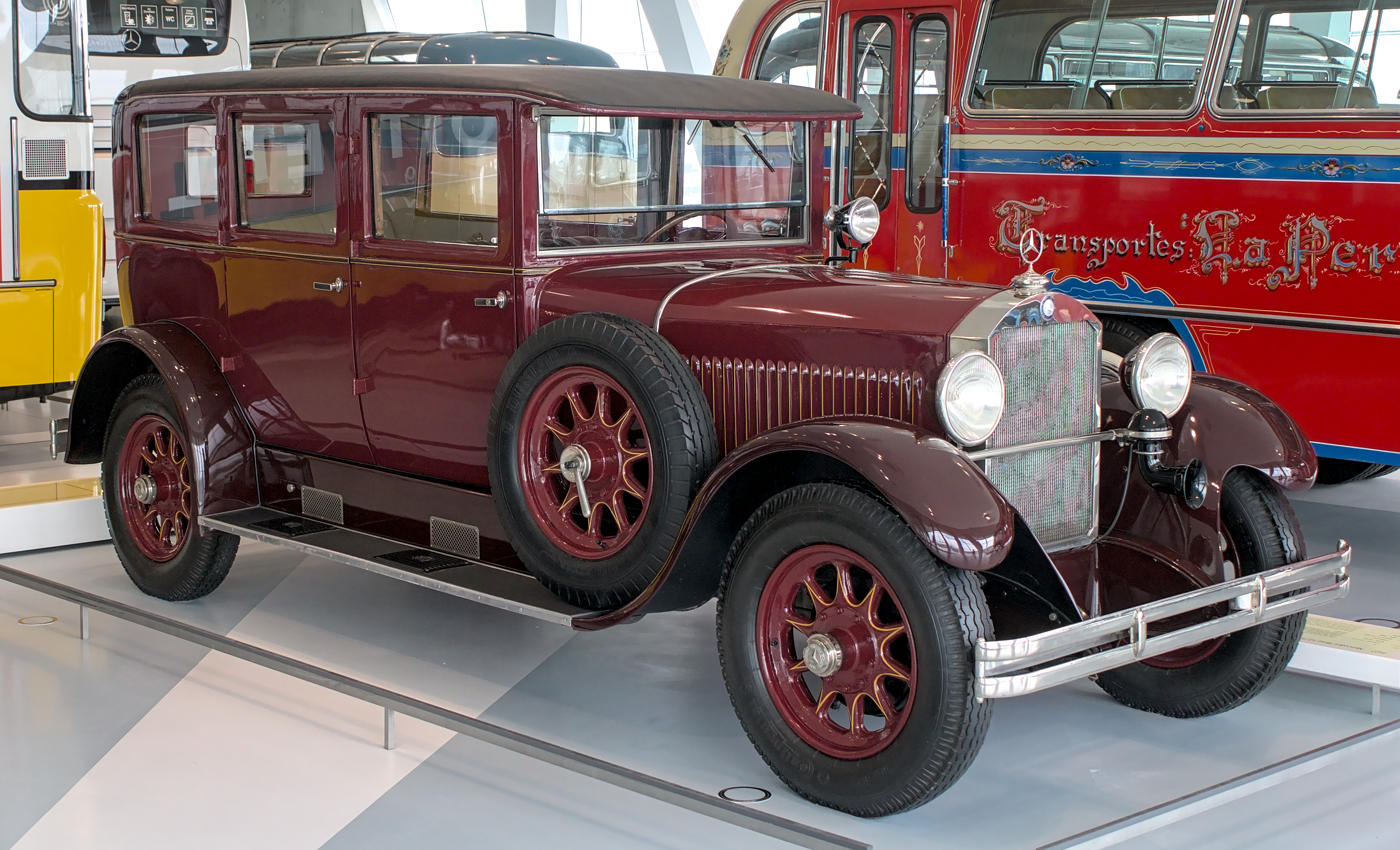
- Mercedes-Benz W03

Overview
- Manufacturer: Daimler-Benz AG
- Also called: 1926–1929 Mercedes-Benz 12/55 PS; 1929–1930: Mercedes-Benz 14/60 PS 1926–1927: Mercedes-Benz W03; 1927–1929: Mercedes-Benz W04; 1929–1930: Mercedes-Benz W05 1926–1928: Mercedes-Benz Typ 300; 1928–1929: Mercedes-Benz Typ 320; 1929–1930: Mercedes-Benz Typ 350
- Production: 1926–1930; 4,432 cars
- Assembly: Germany: Stuttgart

Body and chassis
- Body style: Torpedo bodied “Tourenwagen” 4-door ”Pullman-Limousine” (sedan/saloon); Various coachbuilt bodies supplied by independent coachbuilders
- Layout: FR layout

Powertrain
- Engine: 1926–27: 2,968 cc M03 I6; 1927–28: 2,994 cc M04 I6 1928–29: 3,131 cc M04 I6 1929–30: 3,444 cc M09 I6

Dimensions
- Wheelbase: 3,430 mm (135 in)
- Length: 4,650 mm (183 in)
- Width: 1,760 mm (69 in)
- Height: 1,920 mm (76 in)

Chronology
- Successor: Mercedes-Benz W10

The Mercedes-Benz W03 was a large six-cylinder-engined automobile introduced as the Mercedes-Benz 12/55 PS and, initially, as the Mercedes-Benz Typ 300, by Daimler-Benz at the Berlin Motor Show in October 1926. It was developed in some haste under the manufacturer's Technical Director, Ferdinand Porsche in parallel with the smaller Mercedes-Benz W 01 (which never progressed beyond the prototype stage) and the two-litre-engined Mercedes-Benz W02 following the creation of Daimler-Benz, formally in July 1926, from the fusion of the Daimler and Benz & Cie auto-businesses.

== Naming conventions ==
The manufacturer applied the widely followed German naming conventions of the time. On the Mercedes-Benz 12/55 PS the “12” defined the car's tax horsepower, used by the authorities to determine the level of annual car tax to be imposed on car owners. The “55” defined the manufacturer's claims regarding car's actual power output as defined in Horsepower#Metric horsepower (PS, cv, hk, pk, ks, ch). In Germany tax horsepower, which had been defined by statute since 1906, was based on the dimensions of the cylinders in the engine.

Unlike the systems used elsewhere in Europe, the German tax horsepower calculation took account both of the cylinder bore and of the cylinder stroke, and there was therefore a direct linear relationship between engine size and tax horsepower.

The model was upgraded in 1927 and effectively relaunched in 1929, benefiting from the attentions of Hans Nibel who from January 1929, newly appointed as Technical Director, held sole responsibility for model development. The 1927 upgrade saw the car receiving a new works number, the Mercedes-Benz 12/55 PS / Typ 300 (W03) being replaced by the Mercedes-Benz 12/55 PS / Typ 300 (W04). The 1929 relaunch was accompanied by further new works number and a modified name, reflecting the increased horsepower and greater cubic capacity of the enlarged engine introduced that year, now being named the Mercedes-Benz 14/60 PS / Typ 350 (W05).

In retrospect the cars are frequently referred to by company works numbers, as the Mercedes-Benz W03, Mercedes-Benz W04 and Mercedes-Benz W05: this minimises the risk of confusion with other Mercedes-Benz models with names similar to “Mercedes-Benz Typ 300”.

== Mercedes-Benz Typ 300 (W 03: 1926–1927) ==
The car was offered in bare chassis form for customers wishing to purchase a car body from an independent coach builder. Standard bodies from the manufacturer started with a Torpedo bodied “Tourenwagen” and included 4-door ”Pullman-Limousine” (sedan/saloon) bodies. Bodies provided by specialist coachbuilders also included cabriolets and landaulets.

The side-valve six-cylinder 2,968 cc engine delivered a maximum output of 55 PS (40 kW; 54 hp) at 3,500 rpm which translated into a top speed of 100 km/h (62 mph). Power was transmitted via a four-speed manual transmission to the rear wheels which were fixed to a rigid axle suspended from semi-elliptic leaf springs. The braking applied to all four wheels, mechanically controlled using rod linkages.

Like its two-litre contemporary, the Mercedes-Benz W02, the W03 failed to find as many customers as the manufacturer had hoped for, with just 205 cars sold in 1926 (which was admittedly a particularly poor year for passenger car sales in Germany). The W03 was very comfortable, but it was seen as too large and heavy. Just a few months after deliveries began an upgraded model appeared in January 1927.

== Mercedes-Benz Typ 300 (W 04: 1927–1928) ==
The upgrade in early 1927 involved a new model number, W04, although the wheelbase and gear ratios in the transmission were unchanged. The cylinder dimensions were slightly changed, giving rise to a small increase in total engine capacity to 2,994 cc. Claimed maximum output was unchanged at 55 PS (40 kW; 54 hp), but now at the lower engine speed of 3,200 rpm. At the back, however, the final drive ratio was changed from 5.4 :1 to 4.8 : 1, and the listed top speed went up to 108 km/h (67 mph)

Although sales levels improved, the volumes continued to undershoot the manufacturer's expectations, and for 1928 the W04 received a further makeover.

== Mercedes-Benz Typ 320 (W 04: 1928) ==
Having raised the final drive and the top speed for 1927, the manufacturer now moved to offer a choice of ratios, either reducing it back to 5.4 :1 or raising it further to 5.8 :1. The former ratio was described as the “Flachland” (flat lands) version while the latter as the “Berg” (mountain) version. At the same time a small increase in the cylinder stroke accounted for an increase in overall engine capacity to 3,131 cc. Claimed maximum output was unchanged at 55 PS (40 kW; 54 hp), still at 3,200, although there was a measurable increase in torque.

Claimed top speed came back down to 100 km/h (62 mph) with the “flat-lands” final-drive ratio and 95 km/h (59 mph) with the back axle configured for mountainous areas.

Sales volumes continued to disappoint. The manufacturer addressed the matter with a further upgrade.

== Mercedes-Benz Typ 350 (W 05: 1929–1930) ==
The engine was enlarged further, this time to 3,444 cc, and the car received a new works number, becoming the Mercedes-Benz W05, as well as a new name in the market place, now being sold as the “Mercedes-Benz 14/60 PS” or as the “Mercedes-Benz Typ 350”. For the first time with this model, there was also an increase in listed maximum power, now quoted as at 60 PS (44 kW; 59 hp), still at 3,200. Gear box ratios again remained unchanged, but the rear axle ratio was now reduced to 5.0 : 1 (flat lands) version or 5.4 : 1 (mountain). This gave rise to top speeds respectively of 103 km/h (64 mph) and 100 km/h (62 mph).

No one had really expected the latest upgrade to lead to a dramatic improvement in sales. 1929 was the last full year for the W05 car which was replaced by the W10 “Typ Mannheim” model, which would be built on a slightly shorter wheelbase.

== Commercial ==
The six-cylinder sedan/saloon sector in which the Mercedes Benz W03/W04/W05 competed was crowded at a time when the number of customers who were willing and able to spend around 10,000 Marks on a car was limited. The car competed for customers with similarly sized, often significantly less expensive, models from established manufacturers, including Adler, Wanderer and Horch along with several smaller and more completely forgotten German automakers. German Market growth in the late 1920s was increasingly focused on smaller cars, and Mercedes-Benz were far from alone in being disappointed with the volumes achieved in the six-cylinder class.

Production volumes:

1926–27: Typ 300 (W 03): 1,018 cars
1927–29: Typ 300 (W 04): 2,485 cars
1928–29: Typ 320 (W 04): 202 cars
1929–30: Typ 350 (W 05): 727 cars

== Sources and further reading ==
- Werner Oswald: Mercedes-Benz Personenwagen 1886–1986. 4. Auflage. Motorbuch Verlag Stuttgart (1987). ISBN 3-613-01133-6, S. 46–47
- Halwart Schrader: Deutsche Autos 1885–1920. Motorbuch Verlag Stuttgart (2002). ISBN 3-613-02211-7, S. 67
- Oswald, Werner (2001). Deutsche Autos 1920–1945, Band (vol) 2 (in German). Motorbuch Verlag. ISBN 3-613-02170-6.

This entry incorporates information from the equivalent German Wikipedia entry.
