= Mercedes-Benz M02 engine =

Mercedes-Benz M02

Overview
- Manufacturer: Mercedes-Benz
- Production: 1926-1933

Layout
- Configuration: Inline-6
- Displacement: 2.0 L (122 cu in)
- Cylinder bore: 65 mm (2.6 in)
- Piston stroke: 100 mm (3.9 in)
- Valvetrain: 12-valve, SOHC, two valves per cylinder
- Compression ratio: 5.0:1

Combustion
- Fuel system: Carburetor
- Fuel type: Gasoline
- Oil system: Dry sump

Output
- Power output: 38 hp (28 kW)
- Torque output: 72 lb⋅ft (98 N⋅m)

Chronology
- Successor: Mercedes-Benz M21 engine

The Mercedes-Benz M02 engine is a naturally-aspirated, 2.0-liter, straight-6, internal combustion piston engine, designed, developed and produced by Mercedes-Benz from 1926 through 1933.

== M02 engine ==
The side-valve six-cylinder 1,988 cc engine delivered a maximum output of 38 PS (28 kW; 37 hp) at 3,400 rpm, which translated into a top speed of 75 km/h (47 mph). Power was transmitted via a three-speed manual transmission to the rear wheels, which were fixed to a rigid axle suspended from semi-elliptic leaf springs. The braking applied to all four wheels, mechanically controlled using rod linkages.

== Applications ==
- Mercedes-Benz W02
