= Mercedes-Benz OM 59 =

Four-cylinder diesel engine

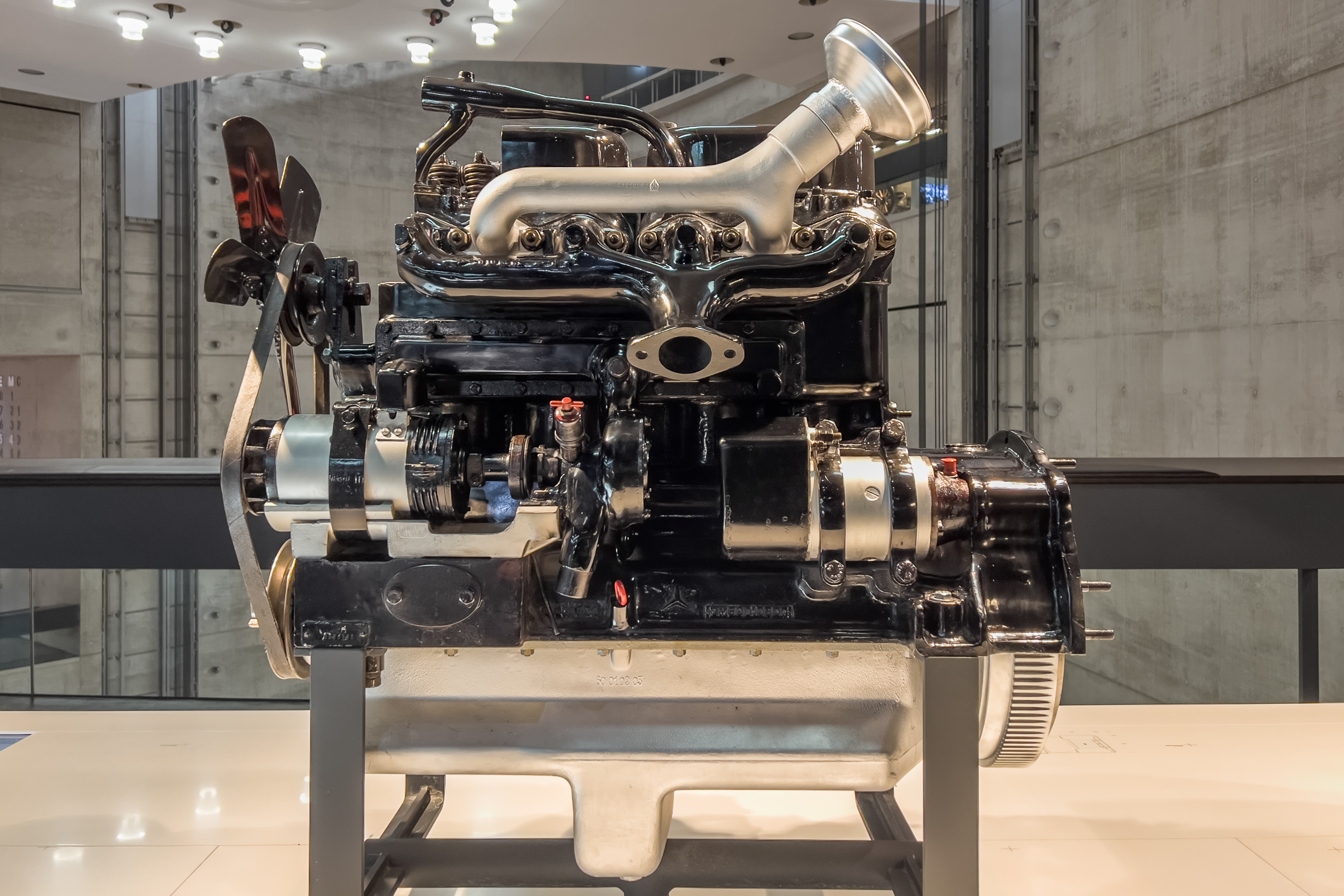
- OM 59 cut-away model on static display at the Mercedes-Benz Museum

Overview
- Manufacturer: Daimler-Benz AG

Layout
- Configuration: Straight-4
- Displacement: 3,770 cc (230 cu in)
- Cylinder bore: 100 mm (3.94 in)
- Piston stroke: 120 mm (4.72 in)
- Cylinder head material: Two reverse-flow cylinder heads
- Valvetrain: OHV
- Compression ratio: 17 : 1

RPM range
- Idle speed: 600 rpm
- Max. engine speed: 2000 rpm

Combustion
- Operating principle: Diesel
- Fuel system: Pre-combustion chamber injection
- Fuel type: Petroleum

Output
- Power output: 55 PS (40 kW)

Chronology
- Predecessor: Mercedes-Benz OM 5
- Successor: Mercedes-Benz OM 300 series

The Mercedes-Benz OM 59 is a straight-four cylinder Diesel engine produced by Mercedes-Benz Group AG, formerly known as Daimler-Benz AG. It was presented to the public in February 1933 at the Berlin IAMA, and later used in the Mercedes-Benz L 2000 series 2-tonne lorries. Prior to the OM 59, automobile Diesel engines were significantly more expensive than spark-ignition options. The introduction of the OM 59 at a price of RM 1260, resulted in an increase of the proportion of diesel engines among trucks and busses.
