= Mercedes-Benz M23 engine =

Mercedes-Benz M23
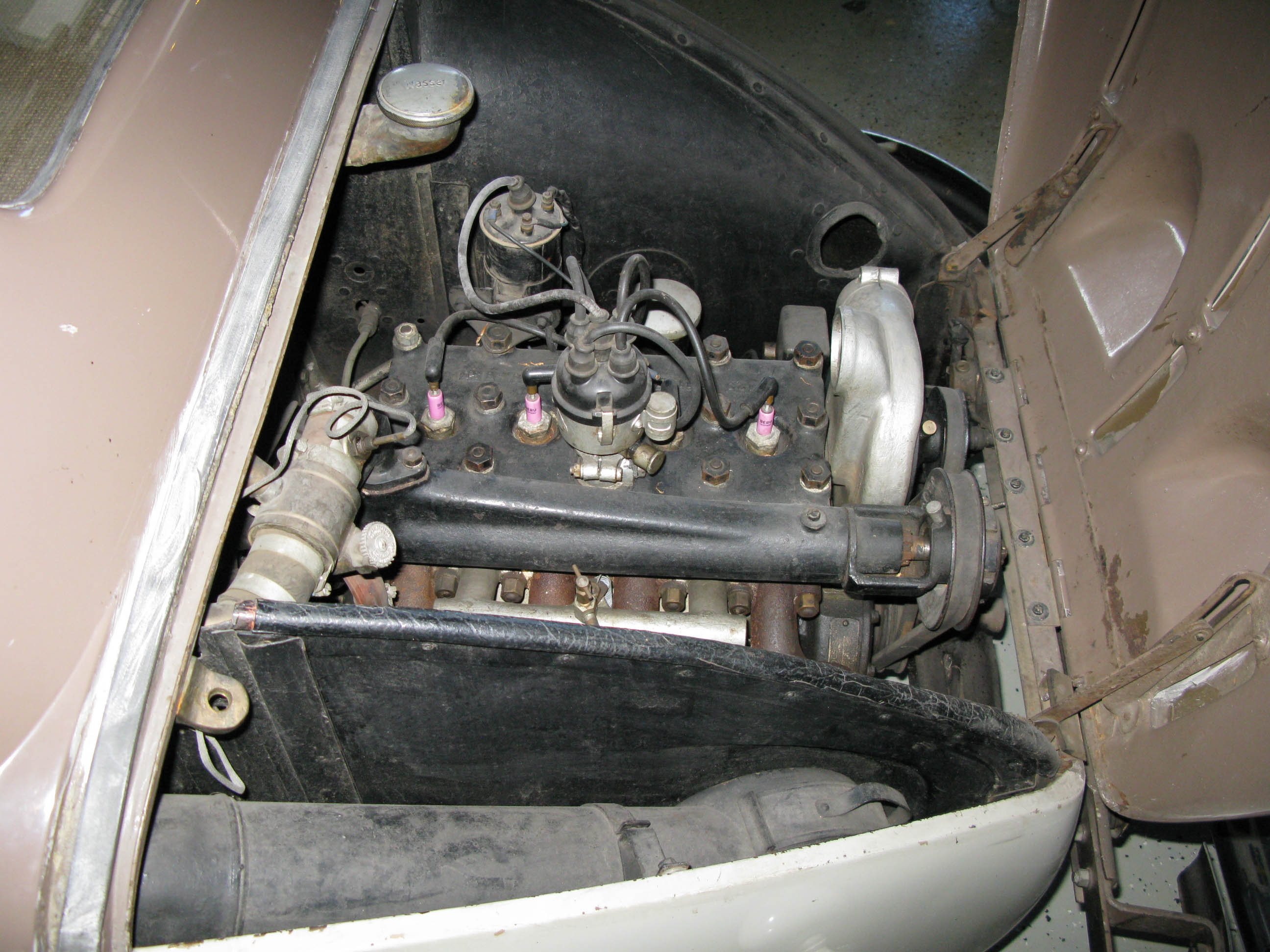
- 1936 Mercedes-Benz 130

Overview
- Manufacturer: Mercedes-Benz
- Production: 1933-1936

Layout
- Configuration: Inline-4
- Displacement: 1.3–1.7 L (79–104 cu in)
- Cylinder bore: 70–72 mm (2.8–2.8 in)
- Piston stroke: 85–92 mm (3.3–3.6 in)
- Valvetrain: 16-valve, DOHC, two-valves per cylinder
- Compression ratio: 6.0:1

Combustion
- Fuel system: Carburetor
- Fuel type: Gasoline
- Oil system: Dry sump

Output
- Power output: 25–55 hp (19–41 kW)
- Torque output: 74 lb⋅ft (100 N⋅m)

The Mercedes-Benz M23 engine is a naturally-aspirated, 1.3-liter, inline-4 gasoline engine, designed, developed and produced by Mercedes-Benz; between 1933 and 1936.

== Development and prototype engines (W17/W25D) ==
At the beginning of the 1930s, there were attempts to move car engines from the forward compartment to the rear of the car. Such a move allows a reduction in the volume of the front compartment. At the same time, the voluminous rear provides a lot of space above and behind the rear axle. Moreover, when engines are rear-mounted, the drive shaft is eliminated.

In 1930, Daimler-Benz entrusted Hans Nibel with the development of a small rear-engined car, starting from the same principles. In 1931, working with Max Wagner, the type W17 or 120(H) was created, a two-door, equipped with a four-cylinder boxer engine in the rear with a displacement of 1200 cc and a power of 25 hp (18.4 kW). There were also attempts with transverse four-cylinder inline engines. In 1932/1933 Mercedes built a prototype with a front similar to the later VW Beetle, and a longer tail.

== Mercedes-Benz 130 (W23) engine ==
Created in 1931 by Nibel, it had the 1.3 liter sidevalve four-cylinder engine mounted at the back, hence the "H", from German heck (rear), With the fan between the rear coil springs, it drove a transmission with three forward speeds, plus a semi-automatic overdrive which did not require the use of a clutch.

== Mercedes-Benz 150 (W30) engine ==
It was derived in 1935 from the 130, and a more powerful engine. Displacing 1498 cc and a power of 55 PS (40 kW). The engine powered the car to a top speed of 125 km/h.

Created in 1934 by Nibel and chassis engineer Max Wagner. the 150H was a two-seat sports roadster. It featured transverse leaf spring front and coil-sprung swing axle rear suspension. A water-cooled 1,498 cc (91.4 cu in) OHC four-cylinder engine, producing 55 hp (41 kW), was mounted in back, hence the "H", from German heck (rear). The radiator was behind that, above the transaxle, with a squirrel-cage blower (reminiscent of the VW Type 1) feeding both radiator and carburetor.

The gas tank, which in the case of the Mercedes-Benz 130 was installed over the engine, was transferred to the front compartment.

== Mercedes-Benz 170 H (W28) engine ==
In 1936, in parallel to the classical front-engine Mercedes-Benz 170 V, Daimler-Benz AG introduced the Mercedes-Benz 170 H which had the same engine as the 170 V, with an architecture derived from that of the 130, its predecessor. The 170 H was powered by a four-cylinder 1697 cc engine with a power of 38 PS (28 kW). The "H" stood for "Heckmotor", or rear engine.

== Applications ==
- Mercedes-Benz 130
- Mercedes-Benz 150
- Mercedes-Benz 170 H
