= Mercedes-Benz M09 engine =

Mercedes-Benz M09

Overview
- Manufacturer: Mercedes-Benz
- Production: 1928-1929

Layout
- Configuration: Inline-6
- Displacement: 3.4 L (207 cu in)
- Cylinder bore: 80 mm (3.1 in)
- Piston stroke: 115 mm (4.5 in)
- Valvetrain: 12-valve, SOHC, two valves per cylinder
- Compression ratio: 5.0:1

Combustion
- Fuel system: Carburetor
- Fuel type: Gasoline
- Oil system: Dry sump

Output
- Power output: 60 hp 45 kW
- Torque output: 100 lb⋅ft 136 N⋅m

Chronology
- Predecessor: Mercedes-Benz M04 engine
- Successor: Mercedes-Benz M10 engine

The Mercedes-Benz M09 engine is a naturally-aspirated, 3.4-liter, straight-6, internal combustion piston engine, designed, developed and produced by Mercedes-Benz in 1928 and 1929.

== Applications ==
- Mercedes-Benz W03
