= Mercedes-Benz M153 engine =

Mercedes-Benz M153

Overview
- Manufacturer: Mercedes-Benz
- Production: 1938-1943

Layout
- Configuration: Inline-6
- Displacement: 2.3 L (140 cu in)
- Cylinder bore: 73.5 mm (2.9 in)
- Piston stroke: 90 mm (3.5 in)
- Valvetrain: 12-valve, SOHC, two-valves per cylinder
- Compression ratio: 6.6:1-7.5:1

Combustion
- Fuel system: Carburetor
- Fuel type: Gasoline
- Oil system: Dry sump

Output
- Power output: 55–58 hp (41–43 kW)
- Torque output: 101–104 lb⋅ft (137–141 N⋅m)

The Mercedes-Benz M153 engine is a naturally-aspirated, 2.3-liter, straight-6, internal combustion piston engine, designed, developed and produced by Mercedes-Benz; between 1938 and 1943.

== Engine ==
The engine was derived from the existing unit, but the cylinder bore was increased by one millimeter which gave rise to an overall increase in engine size to 2289cc. Despite the slightly larger engine size and the inclusion of two twin-chamber Solex 30 JFFK carburetors, claimed power was unchanged at 55 PS (40 kW): the compression ratio was set at the relatively low value of 1 : 6.6. Claimed top speed was 116 km/h (72 mph).

== Applications ==
- Mercedes-Benz W153
