= Mercedes-Benz M124 engine =

Mercedes-Benz M124

Overview
- Manufacturer: Mercedes-Benz
- Production: 1939 - 1940 (prototype)

Layout
- Configuration: Straight-eight
- Displacement: 5.8 L (354 cu in)
- Cylinder bore: 95 mm (3.740 in)
- Piston stroke: 100 mm (3.937 in)
- Cylinder block material: Cast iron
- Cylinder head material: Cast iron
- Valvetrain: 16-valve, DOHC, two valves per cylinder
- Valvetrain drive system: Gears
- Compression ratio: 6.5:1

RPM range
- Max. engine speed: 3600 rpm

Combustion
- Supercharger: Roots-type supercharger
- Fuel system: Carburetor
- Oil system: Dry sump

Output
- Power output: 197 hp (147 kW) at 3400 rpm, peak (compressor engaged) 128 hp (95 kW) at 3400 rpm, continuous
- Torque output: 353 lb⋅ft (479 N⋅m) at 2200 rpm, peak (compressor engaged)

The Mercedes-Benz M124 engine is a prototype supercharged, 5.8-liter, straight-8 engine manufactured by Mercedes-Benz in 1939.

== Applications ==
- 1939 Mercedes-Benz 580K (W129) (prototype)
