= Mercedes-Benz M22 engine =

Mercedes-Benz M22

Overview
- Manufacturer: Mercedes-Benz
- Production: 1933-1934

Layout
- Configuration: Straight-eight
- Displacement: 3.8–4.0 L (232–244 cu in)
- Cylinder bore: 78–80 mm (3.1–3.1 in)
- Piston stroke: 100 mm (3.9 in)
- Valvetrain: 16-valve, DOHC, two valves per cylinder
- Compression ratio: 5.54:1-6.0:1

Combustion
- Supercharger: Naturally aspirated (380); Roots-type supercharger (380 K)
- Fuel system: Carburetor
- Fuel type: Gasoline
- Oil system: Dry sump

Output
- Power output: 89–143 hp 66–107 kW
- Torque output: 146–209 lb⋅ft 198–283 N⋅m

Chronology
- Predecessor: Mercedes-Benz M19 engine
- Successor: Mercedes-Benz M24 engine

The Mercedes-Benz M22 is a naturally-aspirated and supercharged 3.8- or 4.0-liter straight-8 engine, designed, developed and produced by Mercedes-Benz in 1933 and 1934.

== Applications ==
- Mercedes-Benz 380
