= Mercedes-Benz M03 engine =

Mercedes-Benz M03

Overview
- Manufacturer: Mercedes-Benz
- Production: 1926-1927

Layout
- Configuration: Inline-6
- Displacement: 3.0 L (183 cu in)
- Cylinder bore: 76 mm (3.0 in)
- Piston stroke: 115 mm (4.5 in)
- Valvetrain: 12-valve, SOHC, two-valves per cylinder
- Compression ratio: 5.1:1

Combustion
- Fuel system: Carburetor
- Fuel type: Gasoline
- Oil system: Dry sump

Output
- Power output: 55 hp (41 kW)
- Torque output: 81–103 lb⋅ft (110–140 N⋅m)

Chronology
- Successor: Mercedes-Benz M04 engine

The Mercedes-Benz M03 engine is a naturally-aspirated, 3.0-liter, straight-6, internal combustion piston engine, designed, developed and produced by Mercedes-Benz; between 1926 and 1927.

== M03 engine ==
The side-valve six-cylinder 2,968 cc engine delivered a maximum output of 55 PS (40 kW; 54 hp) at 3,500 rpm which translated into a top speed of 100 km/h (62 mph). Power was transmitted via a four-speed manual transmission to the rear wheels which were fixed to a rigid axle suspended from semi-elliptic leaf springs. The braking applied to all four wheels, mechanically controlled using rod linkages.

== Applications ==
- Mercedes-Benz 12/55 hp Type 300 Sedan
