= Mercedes-Benz M19 engine =

Mercedes-Benz M19

Overview
- Manufacturer: Mercedes-Benz
- Production: 1932-1933

Layout
- Configuration: Straight-eight
- Displacement: 3.8 L (232 cu in)
- Cylinder bore: 78 mm (3.1 in)
- Piston stroke: 100 mm (3.9 in)
- Valvetrain: 16-valve, DOHC, two valves per cylinder

Combustion
- Fuel system: Carburetor
- Fuel type: Gasoline
- Oil system: Dry sump

Output
- Power output: 85 hp 63 kW
- Torque output: 140 lb⋅ft 190 N⋅m

Chronology
- Predecessor: Mercedes-Benz M08 engine
- Successor: Mercedes-Benz M22 engine

The Mercedes-Benz M19 is a naturally-aspirated, 3.8-liter, straight-8 engine, designed, developed and produced by Mercedes-Benz in 1932 and 1933.

== Applications ==
- Mercedes-Benz 380 S (W10)
- Mercedes-Benz 380 S (W19)
