= Mercedes-Benz M15 engine =

Mercedes-Benz M15

Overview
- Manufacturer: Mercedes-Benz
- Production: 1931-1936

Layout
- Configuration: Inline-6
- Displacement: 1.7 L (104 cu in)
- Cylinder bore: 65 mm (2.6 in)
- Piston stroke: 85 mm (3.3 in)
- Valvetrain: 12-valve, SOHC, two-valves per cylinder
- Compression ratio: 5.75:1

Combustion
- Fuel system: Carburetor
- Fuel type: Gasoline
- Oil system: Dry sump

Output
- Power output: 32 hp (24 kW)
- Torque output: 52.5 lb⋅ft (71 N⋅m)

The Mercedes-Benz M15 engine is a naturally-aspirated, 1.7-liter, straight-6, internal combustion piston engine, designed, developed and produced by Mercedes-Benz; between 1931 and 1936.

== M15 Engine ==
The car was powered by a six-cylinder 1,692 cc engine: maximum power was set at 23.5 kW (32 PS; 32 hp) at 3,200 rpm. The engine featured central lubrication and the water-based cooling system for the engine employed both a pump and a thermostat. Power was transmitted to the rear wheels via what was in effect a four-speed manual transmission, on which the top gear operated as a form of overdrive. Third gear used the 1:1 ratio conventionally used by a top gear, and there was a fourth gear with a ratio of 1 : 0.73. Fuel economy was quoted as 11 litres per 100 kilometres (26 mpg_{‑imp}; 21 mpg_{‑US}) and top speed 90 km/h (56 mph), which combined to represent a competitive level of performance in the passenger car market of that time.

== Applications ==
- Mercedes-Benz W15
