= Mercedes-Benz W08 =

Mercedes-Benz W 08
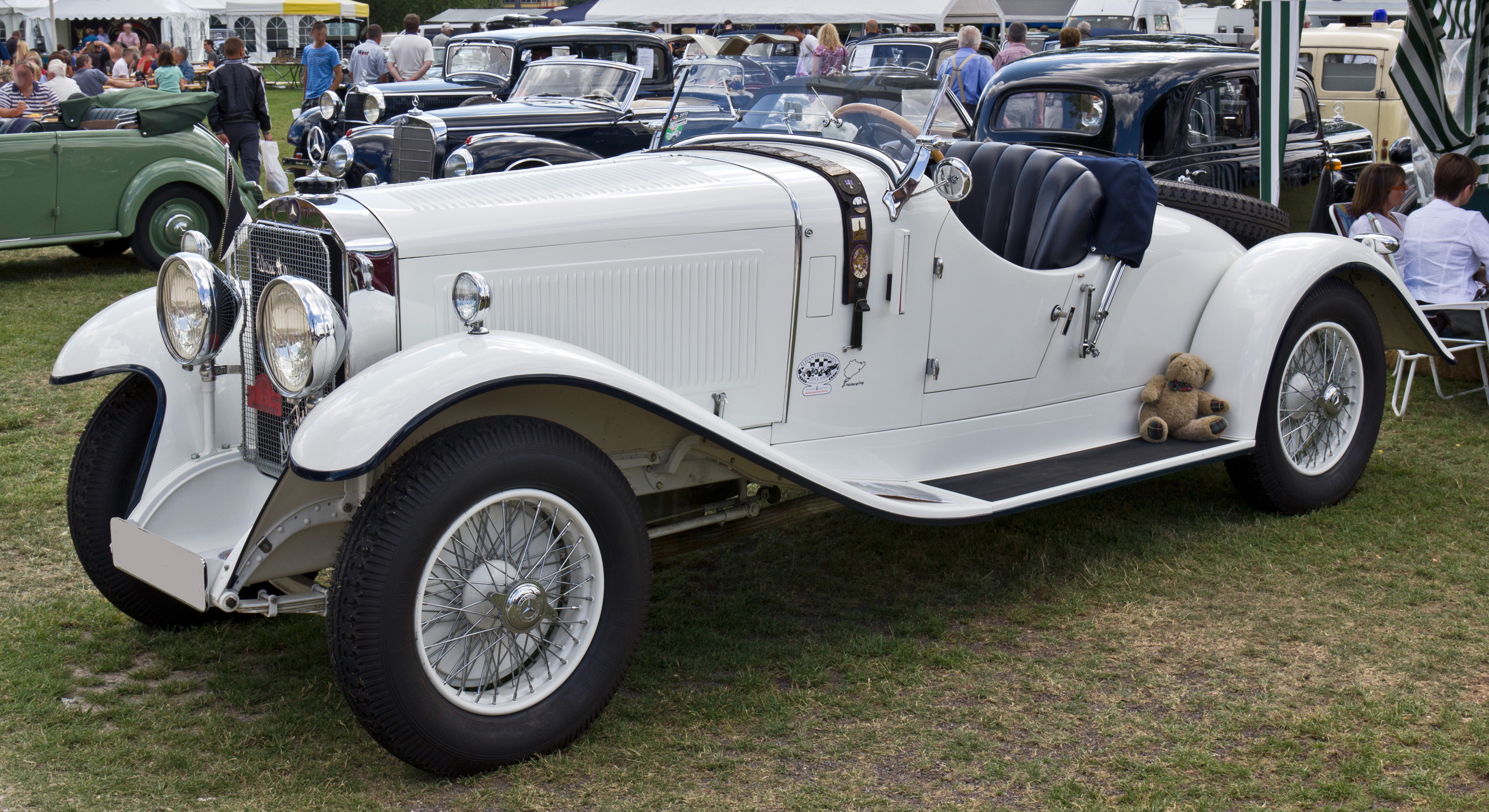
- Mercedes-Benz W08 Sport Roadster (1929)

Overview
- Manufacturer: Mercedes-Benz
- Also called: 1928–1933: Mercedes-Benz Typ Nürburg 460; Mercedes-Benz 18/80 PS; 1931–1932: Mercedes-Benz Typ Nürburg 500; Mercedes-Benz 19/100 PS; 1932–1939: Mercedes-Benz Typ 500
- Production: 1928–1939; 3,824 units
- Assembly: Germany: Stuttgart

Body and chassis
- Class: Large luxury car
- Body style: Torpedo bodied 6 seater “Tourenwagen” 6-seater Pullman-Limousine; Roadster; 2 & 4-door Cabriolets (various)
- Layout: FR layout

Powertrain
- Engine: 1928–1933: 4,622cc M08 I8; 1931–1939: 4,918cc M08 I8

Dimensions
- Wheelbase: standard chassis 1928–1939: 3,670 mm (144 in) short chassis 1931–1933: 3,430 mm (135 in)
- Length: 5,140 mm (202 in) - 5,380 mm (212 in)
- Width: 1928–1929: 1,760 mm (69 in); 1929–1939: 1,820 mm (72 in)
- Height: 1928–1929: 1,900 mm (75 in); 1929–1939: 1,820 mm (72 in)

Chronology
- Predecessor: Mercedes-Benz 400

The Mercedes-Benz W08 was a large luxury car produced by Daimler-Benz. It was introduced in Autumn 1928, as Mercedes-Benz's first eight-cylinder passenger car. Also known by various “type numbers”, it remained in production with various modifications and upgrades until the later summer of 1939, the longest lived Mercedes-Benz model of the 1920s and 1930s.

The name “Typ Nürburg”, after the small village of Nürburg and not to confuse with the large city of Nürnberg (Nuremberg), refers to the Nürburg-Ring racetrack that was opened in 1927, with the recently merged brand Mercedes-Benz winning the first Eifelrennen and the German Grands Prix of 1927 and of 1928 with the six-cylinder Mercedes-Benz W06 Types S and SS.

== Typ Nürburg 460 (1928–1929) ==
The W08 “Typ Nürburg 460” was developed by Ferdinand Porsche, who had transferred to Daimler (DMG) from the firm’s Austrian affiliate in 1923 after Paul Daimler left DMG. Porsche was the board member with responsibility for new product development. The company’s objective with the first eight cylinder Mercedes-Benz was to come up with a serious competitor to the Horch 8 that Paul Daimler designed after being hired by Argus and Horch. Porsche’s work on the new car appears to have been very rushed as the result was a car with a traditional tall “overslung” (“Hochbett”) chassis with the longitudinal chassis members directly above the axles, at a time when newer designs increasingly favored low “underslung” (“Tiefbett”) chassis layouts on which the axles sat directly above the load bearing chassis beams. The 1928 Mercedes-Benz W08 therefore looked unfashionably tall even at the time of its launch, and was not as easy to enter as lower vehicles.

The engine was a 4,622cc straight-8 side-valve unit for which maximum output was given as 80 PS (59 kW; 79 hp) at 3,400 rpm which translated into a top speed of 100 km/h (62 mph). The wheels were suspended from rigid axles supported by semi-elliptical leaf springs at the front and at the back. Braking applied on all four wheels used a servo brake booster mechanical linkage supported by a Bosch-Dewandre vacuum suction device.

The car was close in size to the Horch 8 Type 303 which had effectively been benchmarked for its design. The 1928 “Pullman-Limousine” bodied version of the Horch came with an overall length of 5,000 mm (200 in) and a weight of 2,100 kg (bare chassis weight 1400 kg). The 1928 “Pullman-Limousine” bodied version of the Mercedes-Benz Nürburg 460 was 4,890 mm (193 in) long which increased to 5,200 mm (200 in) when the detachable rear boot/trunk was added: the Mercedes weighed in at 2,150 kg (bare chassis weight 1550 kg). Both cars had an imposing height in this standard bodied form of 1,900 mm (75 in) even though the Horch had since its 1926 launch incorporated an “underlung” chassis. The cars’ respective widths were 1,765 mm (69.5 in) and 1,760 mm (69 in).

In addition to the “Pullman-Limousine” bodied car, priced by Mercedes-Benz at 15,000 Marks, buyers of the 1928 W08 could choose a Torpedo bodied 6 seater “Tourenwagen” for 14,000 Marks or a 4-door “Cabriolet D” for 17,500 Marks. There is also mention of a reduced wheelbase 2-door cabriolet, although it is not clear whether any of these were produced based on the 1928 W 08.

The big old fashioned and very expensive Mercedes-Benz W08 of 1928 found few customers, and had to be replaced the next year with a more stylish version, now using an “underslung” chassis. Technical Director Porsche’s contract was not renewed at the end of 1928 which was followed by two years of acrimonious litigation between the company and its former Technical Director, while there are reports that it took six years for Mercedes-Benz to sell off, at discounted prices, the already accumulated inventory of 1928 model Nürburg 460s.

== Typ Nürburg 460 (1929–1932) ==
For 1929 the W08 was extensively reworked by the newly appointed Technical Director Hans Nibel. The result was a car with a modern “underslung” chassis whereby the longitudinal chassis beams were located below axel height. This made it easier for people to step into the car as well as allowing for a range of lower and more elegant car bodies to be fitted. The 3,670 mm (144 in) wheelbase was unchanged, however.

The engine and most other technical details were carried over unchanged from the 1928 car including the ratios chosen for the four speed manual transmission. Synchromesh was not included at this stage. A newly available transmission option for 1929 was an additional “overdrive” ratio.

A shorter, if still substantial 3,430 mm (135 in) wheelbase version was available from 1931 for two door cabriolet body work, although as far as is known Mercedes-Benz themselves offered no “standard Sindelfingen built" body of their own for this shorter chassis. The standard bodies offered for the standard wheelbase 1929 cars covered the same possibilities as the 1928 body range. It is clear from surviving examples that many customers preferred to buy the car in base chassis form and have a bespoke body added by an independent coachbuilder, however.

Despite the changes made in 1929, the Mercedes-Benz W08 was still outsold by the Horch 8 which was well established at the top end of the German passenger car market at this time, and which in most body configurations was less expensive. On the other hand, with this model Mercedes was able to ensure that the market place dominance of the big Horch was no longer completely unchallenged.

A Typ Nürburg 460 was gifted to the Pope in 1930.

== Typ Nürburg 500 (1931–1933) ==
In 1931 the 3,670 mm (144 in) wheelbase car became available with an enlarged 4,918cc engine which now also featured a twin downdraft carburettor. Maximum output was now listed as 100 PS (74 kW; 99 hp) at 3,100 rpm and claimed top speed increased to 110 km/h (69 mph). A wider range of standard bodies was also now listed including a six-seater “Pullman-Cabriolet F” priced at 21,800 Marks, along with two and four door “Cabriolet C” and “Cabriolet D” models.

== Typ 500 (1932–1936) ==
In 1932 the W08 lost the “Nürburg” name, being sold simply as the Mercedes-Benz Typ 500. The 4,918cc 100 PS (74 kW; 99 hp) side-valve engine with its twin downdraft carburettor was unchanged, as were the four speed optional overdrive transmission, wheelbase, and list of standard body types. Styling was changed slightly, the most obvious aspect of which was a slight raking of both radiator grille and windscreen.

Despite the same stated maximum output of 100 PS (74 kW; 99 hp) engine compression ratio was slightly raised, as were transmission gear ratios and maximum torque. With slightly larger wheels the Typ 500 could reach 120 km/h (75 mph).

== Typ 500 (1936–1939) ==
1936 saw an increase in claimed maximum output from the engine to 110 PS (81 kW; 108 hp) at 3,300 rpm. The cylinder capacity at 4,918cc was unchanged, but there was a marginal raising of the compression ratio. The claimed top speed was now raised further to 123 km/h (76 mph). Visually the 1936 cars can be differentiated from the increased rake of the front grille and windscreen.

By this time the rival from Horch, the Horch 8, had disappeared from the scene (in 1935) and Mercedes-Benz production of their own 8 cylinder cars had slowed to a trickle. Between 1931 and 1935 the annual volume of passenger car sales in Germany more than tripled, but these very large cars did not share in the general auto-market expansion of the 1930s. The W 08 remained in production till 1939, annual production volumes for 1936, 1937, 1938 and 1939 falling to 87, 54, 50 and 51 cars. The model was discontinued in 1939 without any immediate successor, twenty-four years passing before the next road-going 8-cylinder engined Mercedes-Benz appeared, the V8 Mercedes-Benz 600 in 1963, while race cars like the 1937 Mercedes-Benz W125 had inline 8 engines, which was resumed with the 1954 Mercedes-Benz W196. During its final years the W 08 was the only model in the manufacturer's range still featuring rigid axles and wooden wheels.

The Mercedes-Benz W08 was never intended or expected to sell in massive volumes, and production totaled 3,824 cars during its eleven-year run between 1928 and 1939. Its less expensive and exclusive rival, the Zwickau built Horch 8, sold approximately 12,000 cars between 1926 and 1934 when Horch introduced V8 and even V12 engines, also used in the Maybach Zeppelin.

== Sources and further reading ==
- Oswald, Werner (2001). Deutsche Autos 1920-1945, Band (vol) 2 (in German). Motorbuch Verlag. ISBN 3-613-02170-6.

This entry incorporates information from the equivalent German Wikipedia entry.
