= Mercedes-Benz M04 engine =

Mercedes-Benz M04

Overview
- Manufacturer: Mercedes-Benz
- Production: 1927-1928

Layout
- Configuration: Inline-6
- Displacement: 3.0–3.1 L (183–189 cu in)
- Cylinder bore: 76 mm (3.0 in)
- Piston stroke: 115 mm (4.5 in)
- Valvetrain: 12-valve, SOHC, two-valves per cylinder
- Compression ratio: 5.0:1

Combustion
- Fuel system: Carburetor
- Fuel type: Gasoline
- Oil system: Dry sump

Output
- Power output: 55 hp (41 kW)
- Torque output: 119 lb⋅ft (161 N⋅m)

Chronology
- Predecessor: Mercedes-Benz M03 engine
- Successor: Mercedes-Benz M09 engine

The Mercedes-Benz M04 engine is a naturally-aspirated, 3.0-liter and 3.1-liter, straight-6, internal combustion piston engine, designed, developed and produced by Mercedes-Benz; between 1927 and 1928.

== M04 engine ==
The side-valve six-cylinder 2,994 cc engine delivered maximum output of 55 PS (40 kW; 54 hp), but now at the lower engine speed of 3,200 rpm. At the back, however, the final drive ratio was changed from 5.4 :1 to 4.8 : 1, and the listed top speed went up to 108 km/h (67 mph)

Having raised the final drive and the top speed for 1927, the manufacturer now moved to offer a choice of ratios, either reducing it back to 5.4 :1 or raising it further to 5.8 :1. The former ratio was described as the “Flachland” (flat lands) version while the latter as the “Berg” (mountain) version. At the same time a small increase in the cylinder stroke accounted for an increase in overall engine capacity to 3,131 cc. Claimed maximum output was unchanged at 55 PS (40 kW; 54 hp), still at 3,200, although there was a measurable increase in torque.

== Applications ==
- Mercedes-Benz 12/55 hp Type 320 Sedan
