= Mercedes-Benz M30 engine =

Mercedes-Benz M30

Overview
- Manufacturer: Mercedes-Benz
- Production: 1934-1939

Layout
- Configuration: Inline-4
- Displacement: 1.5 L (92 cu in)
- Cylinder bore: 72 mm (2.8 in)
- Piston stroke: 92 mm (3.6 in)
- Valvetrain: 8-valve, OHC, two-valves per cylinder
- Compression ratio: 7.0:1

Combustion
- Fuel system: Carburetor
- Fuel type: Gasoline
- Oil system: Dry sump

Output
- Power output: 55 hp (41 kW)
- Torque output: 63 lb⋅ft (85 N⋅m)

The Mercedes-Benz M30 engine is a naturally-aspirated, 1.5-liter, inline-4 gasoline engine, designed, developed and produced by Mercedes-Benz; between 1934 and 1939.

== Applications ==
- Mercedes-Benz 150 (W30)
