= Daimler M9456 engine =

Daimler-Mercedes M9456 engine

Overview
- Manufacturer: Daimler-Mercedes (Daimler AG)
- Production: 1924-1929

Layout
- Configuration: Inline-6
- Displacement: 6.2–6.4 L (378–391 cu in)
- Cylinder bore: 94 mm (3.7 in)
- Piston stroke: 150 mm (5.9 in)
- Valvetrain: 12-valve, SOHC, two-valves per cylinder
- Compression ratio: 5.0:1

Combustion
- Supercharger: Roots-type supercharger
- Fuel system: Carburetor
- Fuel type: Gasoline
- Oil system: Dry sump

Output
- Power output: 99–158 hp (74–118 kW)
- Torque output: 215–318 lb⋅ft (292–431 N⋅m)

The Daimler-Mercedes M9456 engine is a supercharged and naturally-aspirated, 6.2-liter to 6.4-liter, straight-6, internal combustion piston engine, designed, developed and produced by Mercedes-Benz, in partnership with Daimler; between 1924 and 1929.

== M9456 engine ==
The six-cylinder in-line 6240 cc engine featured an overhead camshaft which at the time was an unusual feature, with “bevel linkage”. However, it was the switchable supercharger (”Kompressor”), adopted from the company's racing cars, that attracted most of the attention. With the device switched off maximum claimed output was of 100 PS (74 kW; 99 hp) at 3,100 rpm: with the supercharger operating, maximum output rose to 140 PS (103 kW; 138 hp).

The top speed listed was 115 km/h (71 mph) or 120 km/h (75 mph) depending on which of the two offered final drive ratios was fitted.

From 1928 the Modell K received a still more powerful "Kompressor engine", although there was no change to the overall engine size. Stated power now increased to 110 PS (81 kW; 108 hp) or, with the compressor switched on, 160 PS (118 kW; 158 hp). The official performance figures were unchanged.

== Applications ==
- Mercedes 24/100/140 PS
