= Mercedes-Benz MB503 engine =

Mercedes-Benz MB503

Overview
- Manufacturer: Mercedes-Benz
- Production: 1937–1939

Layout
- Configuration: 60° V12
- Displacement: 42.35–44.5 L (2,584–2,716 cu in)
- Cylinder bore: 6.22–6.38 in (158.0–162.1 mm)
- Piston stroke: 7.09 in (180.1 mm)
- Valvetrain: 24-valve, SOHC, two-valves per cylinder

Combustion
- Supercharger: Roots-type supercharger
- Fuel system: Fuel injection
- Fuel type: Gasoline
- Oil system: Dry sump
- Cooling system: Water-cooled

Output
- Power output: 580–1,200 hp (433–895 kW)
- Torque output: 1,646–2,521 lb⋅ft (2,232–3,418 N⋅m)

Dimensions
- Dry weight: 790–920 kg (1,742–2,028 lb)

The Mercedes-Benz MB 503 was a German prototype four-stroke V-12 gasoline marine and aircraft engine, designed and concepted before World War II. The MB 503 was based on and derived from the Daimler-Benz DB 603 inverted V-12 aircraft engine. It was a liquid-cooled 12-cylinder inverted V12 enlargement of the DB 601, which was in itself a development of the DB 600. The eventual powerplants chosen to be used in the Panzer VIII Maus super-heavy tank were the MB 509 V-12 gasoline engine, derived from the Daimler-Benz DB 603; and also the MB 517 V-12 diesel engine.

== See also ==
- Mercedes-Benz MB507 - Diesel variant based on the Daimler-Benz DB 603.
