= Mercedes-Benz W10 =

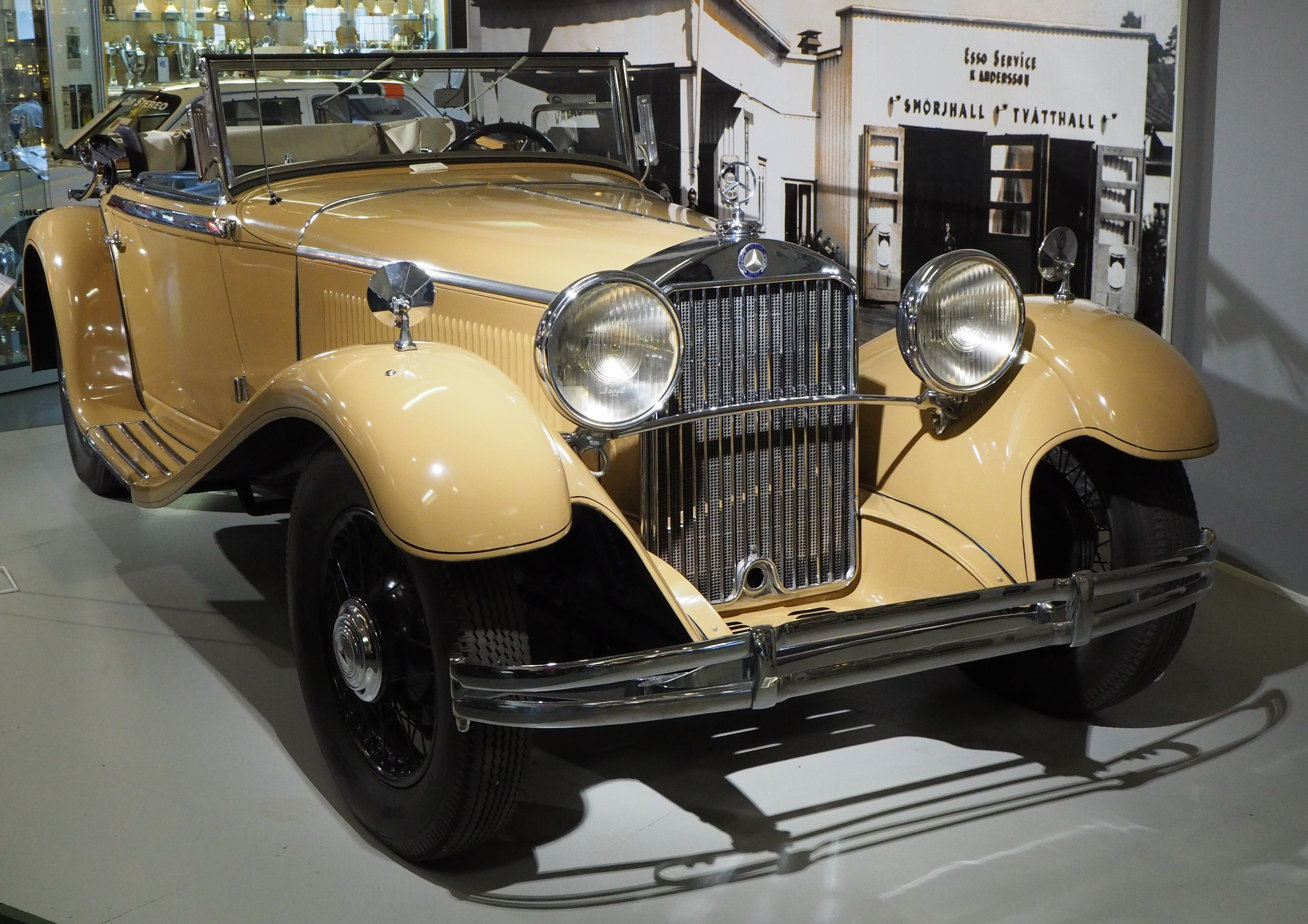
- 1931 Mercedes-Benz Mannheim 370 S Sport-Cabriolet

Overview
- Manufacturer: Mercedes-Benz
- Also called: Mercedes-Benz names: 1929–1930: Mercedes Benz Typ Mannheim 350 (W10); 1929–1934: Mercedes Benz Typ Mannheim 370 (W10); 1930–1933: Mercedes Benz Typ Mannheim 370K (WK10); 1930–1933: Mercedes Benz Typ Mannheim 370S (WS10); 1932–1933: Mercedes Benz Typ Mannheim 380S (W10); 1932–1933: Mercedes Benz Typ Mannheim 380S (W19) generic names also often used: 1929–1930: Mercedes Benz 14/60PS (W10); 1929–1934: Mercedes Benz 15/75PS (W10); 1930–1933: Mercedes Benz 15/75PS (WK10); 1930–1933: Mercedes Benz 15/78PS (WS10); 1932–1933: Mercedes Benz 15/80PS (W10); 1932–1933: Mercedes Benz 15/85PS (W19)
- Production: 1929–1934
- Assembly: Germany: Stuttgart
- Designer: Hans Nibel

Body and chassis
- Class: Touring car
- Body style: 2/4-door roadster 4-door saloon 4-door limousine
- Layout: FR layout
- Platform: Mercedes-Benz W10

Powertrain
- Engine: 3.4 L M10 I6 (350); 3.7 L M10 II I6 (370, 370K, 370S); 3.8 L M19 I8 (380S); 3.8 L M19 II I8 (380S)
- Transmission: 3-speed manual

Dimensions
- Wheelbase: 3,200 mm (126.0 in) (350, 370, 380S); 3,030 mm (119.3 in) (370K); 2,850 mm (112.2 in) (370S)

Chronology
- Predecessor: Mercedes-Benz W03
- Successor: Mercedes-Benz W18

The Mercedes-Benz W10 was a touring car produced by Mercedes-Benz from 1929 to 1934, replacing the W03/Typ 350 models. The structure originated by Ferdinand Porsche was modified by Hans Nibel.

== Type Mannheim 350 (1929–1930) ==
In contemporary records the car was also frequently identified according to the widely used period German generic naming conventions as the “Mercedes-Benz 14/70 PS”, reflecting its “fiscal” and “actual” horsepower respectively.

In essence the car followed the construction of the Mercedes-Benz W03. However, the wheelbase was reduced by 230 mm (9 inches), and the vehicle even in standard form was a little lighter. In addition to the “Tourer” (two-door four-seater cabriolet) body, the car was available as a four-door saloon and a “Pullman Limousine”

The straight-six 3444 cc engine was carried over from the W03, delivering 70 PS (51 kW) to the rear wheels through a three-speed gear box controlled via a centrally mounted lever. Both axles were rigid, suspended on semi-elliptical leaf springs. Cable-operated brakes provided stopping power to all four wheels. The stated maximum speed was 95 km/h (59 mph).

== Type Mannheim 370 (1929–1934) ==
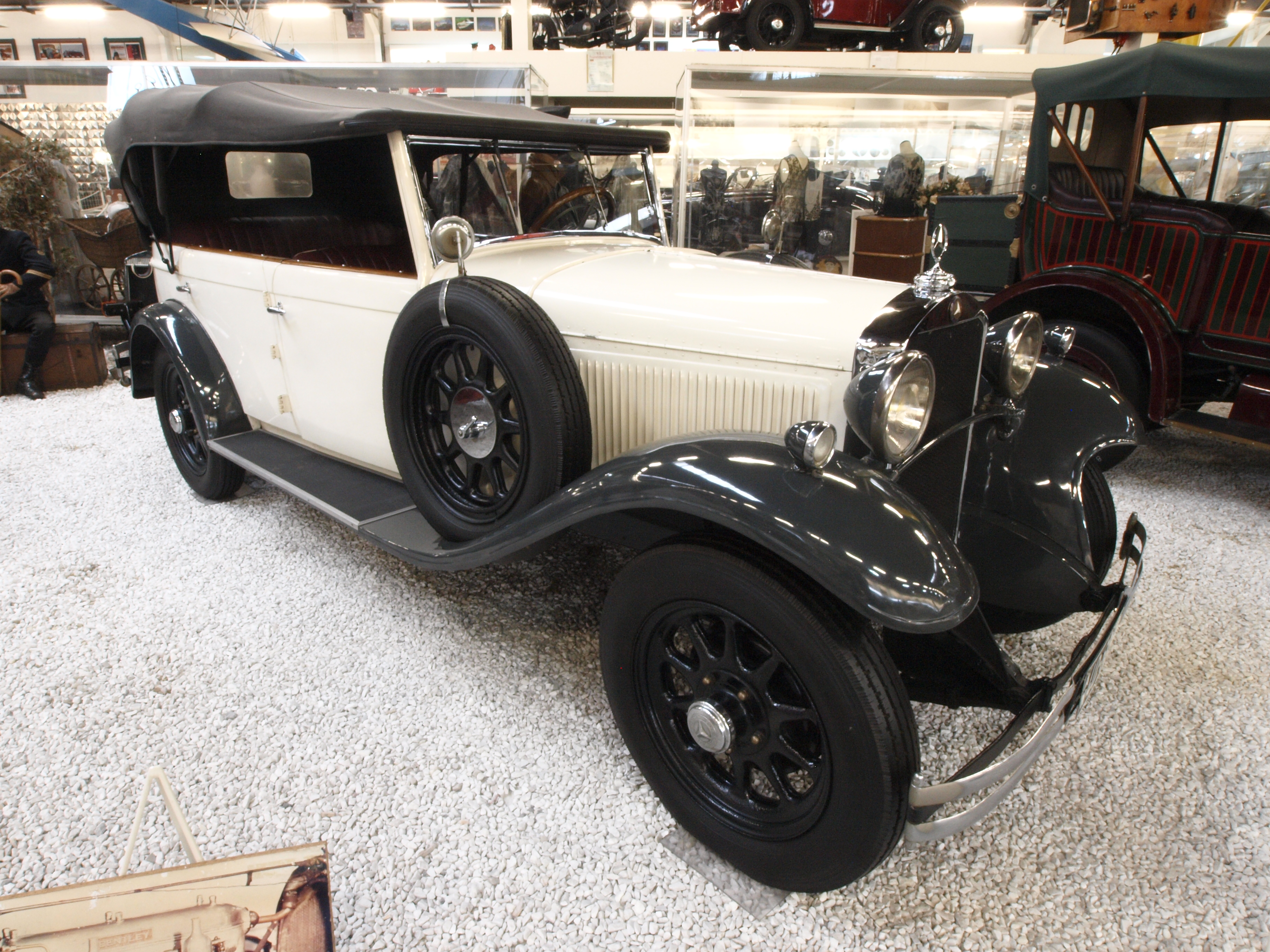
1933 Mercedes-Benz Mannheim 370

The Mannheim 370 was launched alongside the Mannheim 350. In this form, the car had a straight-six 3689 cc. An output of 75 PS (55 kW) was claimed. The three-speed gear box was offered, at extra cost, with a fourth higher ratio. The maximum speed claimed for the Mannheim 370 was 100 km/h (62 mph).

== Type Mannheim 370 K (WK10: 1930–1933) ==
From 1930 the 370K was offered with a wheelbase shortened by 175 mm (7 inches).

Only cabriolet bodied versions of the 370K were offered. The reduced size of the car permitted a maximum speed of 105 km/h (65 mph) to be claimed.

== Typ Mannheim 370 S (WS10: 1930–1933) ==
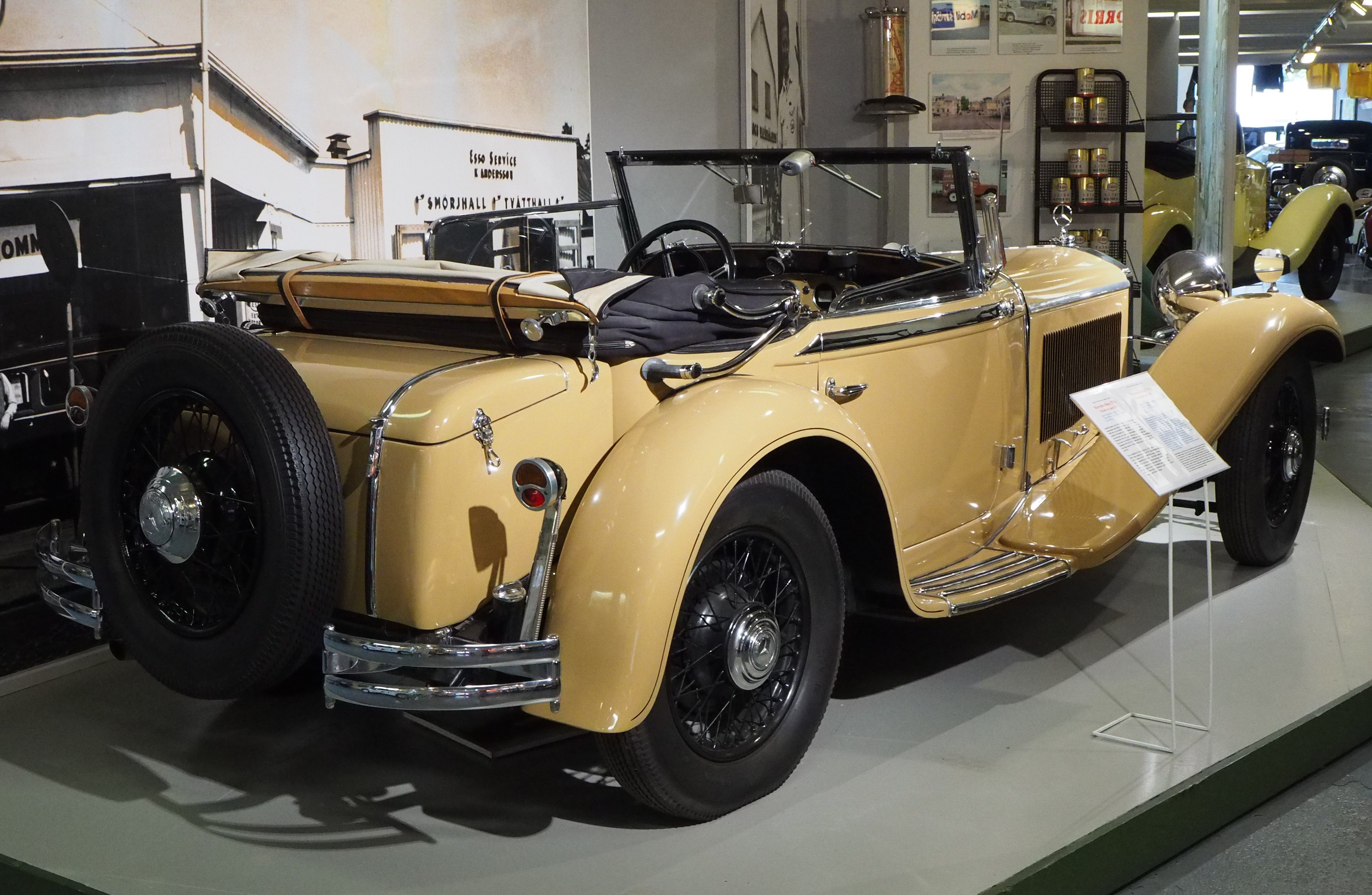
1931 Mercedes-Benz Mannheim 370 S Cabriolet rear

Shorter still, on a wheelbase of just 2850 mm (112 inches) was the 370S, available only with roadster or sport-cabriolet bodies. The maximum speed on these versions was stated as 115 km/h (71 mph). In 1933 the manufacturers increased the compression ratio from 5.5:1 to 5.75:1 with a corresponding increase in power output to 78 PS (57.3 kW) at 3400 rpm

== Typ Mannheim 380 S (WS10: 1932–1933) ==
The 380S came on the standard 3,200 mm (126.0 in) wheelbase, but the car was distinguished by its longer eight-cylinder side-valve engine. Claimed output of the 3820 cc unit was 80 PS (59 kW).

Available with a choice of cabriolet bodies, the car, like its six-cylinder sibling, rode on two rigid axles suspended on semi-elliptical leaf springs. A top speed of 120 km/h (75 mph) was claimed.

== Typ 380 S (W19: 1932–1933) ==
In most respects identical was a version of the car which appeared towards the end of the product run, the 380S (W19) incorporating swing axle rear suspension and a cross mounted leaf spring arrangement at the front. Reflecting the importance of the innovative suspension configuration, this model was given its own internal model number, W19, which differentiates it from the other members of the Mannheim line. The car had the same 3820cc side valve 8 cylinder engine as the Mannheim W10 models, but a raised compression ratio supported an increase in maximum power to 85 PS (63 kW; 84 hp). This car can really be seen as a prototype for the car's Type 380 (W22) successor.

A still higher compression ratio accounted for a claimed increase in output to 85 PS (62.5 kW)

== Commercial ==
The cars were too large and expensive ever to sell in large numbers, though the Mannheim 370 broke the 1,000 units barrier. Overall production was as follows:

W10 350: .........65 cars
W10 370: ......1,279 cars
W10 370 K: ......243 cars
W10 370 S: ......195 cars
W10 380 S: .......94 cars
W19 380 S: ........20 cars

== Succession ==
In 1933 the Mercedes Benz Mannheim 350/370s were replaced by the Type 290 (W18) and by the Type 380 (W22)
