= Mercedes-Benz M143 engine =

Mercedes-Benz M143

Overview
- Manufacturer: Mercedes-Benz
- Production: 1936-1941

Layout
- Configuration: Inline-6
- Displacement: 2.2 L (134 cu in)
- Cylinder bore: 72.5 mm (2.9 in)
- Piston stroke: 90 mm (3.5 in)
- Valvetrain: 12-valve, SOHC, two valves per cylinder
- Compression ratio: 6.6:1-7.25:1

Combustion
- Fuel system: Carburetor
- Fuel type: Gasoline
- Oil system: Dry sump

Output
- Power output: 55–58 hp (41–43 kW)
- Torque output: 100–103 lb⋅ft (136–140 N⋅m)

The Mercedes-Benz M143 is a naturally-aspirated, 2.2-liter straight-6 engine, designed, developed and produced by Mercedes-Benz from 1936 through 1941.

== Applications ==
- Mercedes-Benz W143
