= Mercedes-Benz OM660 engine =

Mercedes-Benz OM660
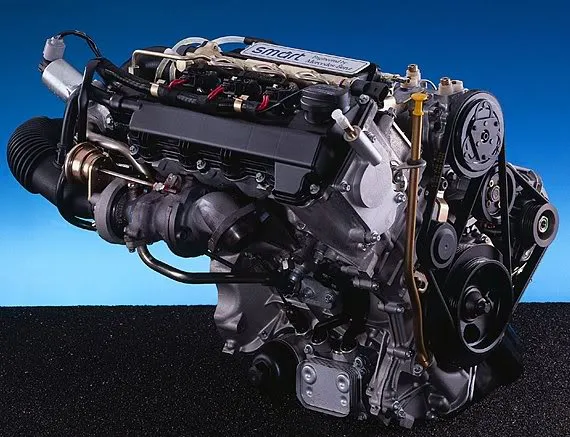

Overview
- Manufacturer: DaimlerChrysler AG (1998–2007); MDC Power GmbH (2007–2014)
- Production: 1998–2014

Layout
- Configuration: Straight-three engine
- Displacement: 0.8 L (799 cc)
- Cylinder bore: 65.5 mm (2.58 in)
- Piston stroke: 79 mm (3.11 in)
- Cylinder block material: Aluminium alloy
- Cylinder head material: Aluminium alloy
- Valvetrain: SOHC 2 valves x cyl.
- Compression ratio: 18.5:1

Combustion
- Turbocharger: Single-turbo
- Fuel system: Direct injection Common rail
- Fuel type: Diesel
- Cooling system: Water cooled

Output
- Power output: 30–40 kW (41–54 PS; 40–54 hp)
- Torque output: 100–130 N⋅m (74–96 lb⋅ft)

The Mercedes-Benz OM 660 is a 0.8-litre turbocharged straight-three Diesel engine produced by DaimlerChrysler and later MDC Power for use in Smart vehicles, from 1999 to 2014.

== Design ==
The OM660 features a single-overhead camshaft with two valves per cylinder and an aluminium alloy cylinder block and head. It is turbocharged and features an exhaust gas recirculation system. The OM660 was updated in 2007 receiving increased performance due to a new common rail fuel system with increased boost pressure, and again in 2011 featuring further performance and efficiency improvements.

== Models ==
Engine	Power	Torque	Years
OM660	30 kW (41 PS; 40 hp) @ 4,200 rpm	100 N⋅m (74 lb⋅ft) @ 1,800–2000 rpm	1999–2006
OM660	33 kW (45 PS; 44 hp) @ 3,800 rpm	110 N⋅m (81 lb⋅ft) @ 2,000–2,500 rpm	2007–2009
OM660	40 kW (54 PS; 54 hp) @ 3,800 rpm	130 N⋅m (96 lb⋅ft) @ 2,100 rpm	2009–2014

=== OM660 (30 kW version) ===
- 1999–2006 W450 Smart Fortwo

=== OM660 (33 kW version) ===
- 2007–2009 W451 Smart Fortwo

=== OM660 (40 kW version) ===
- 2009–2014 W451 Smart Fortwo
