= Mercedes 15/70/100 PS =

Mercedes 15/70/100 PS (aka Mercedes-Benz Typ 400)
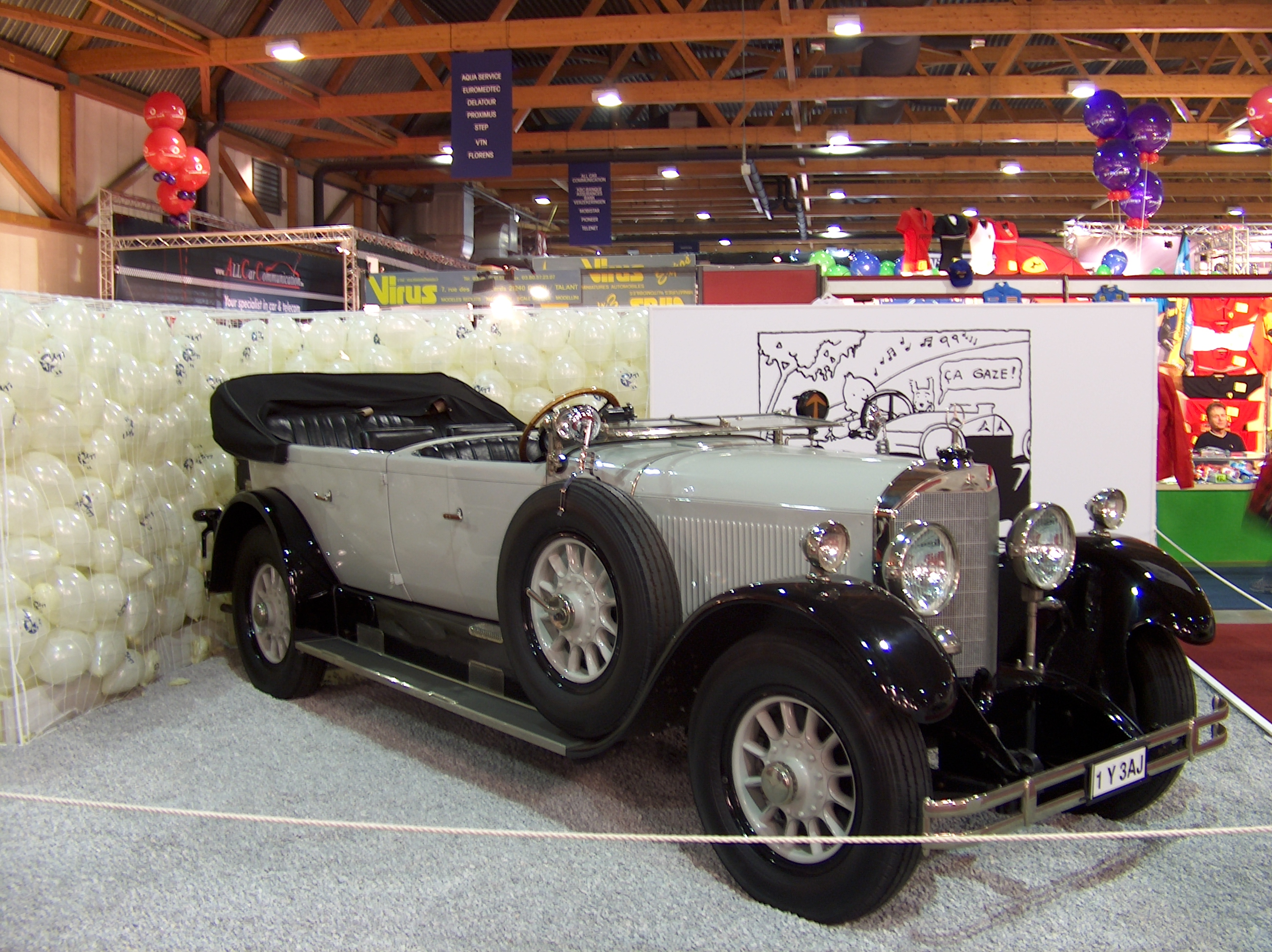
- Mercedes 15/70 PS with Torpedo style bodywork

Overview
- Manufacturer: Daimler-Motoren-Gesellschaft (1924–1926); Daimler-Benz AG (1926–1929)
- Also called: 1924–1926: Mercedes 15/70/100 PS; 1926–1929: Mercedes-Benz 15/70/100 PS; 1926–1929: Mercedes-Benz Typ 400
- Production: 1924–1929
- Assembly: Germany: Stuttgart

Body and chassis
- Body style: Torpedo bodied “Tourenwagen” ”Limousine” (sedan/saloon); Landaulet; 4-door Cabriolet; Many customers will have purchased the car in base chassis format and obtained a body separately
- Layout: FR layout

Powertrain
- Engine: 3,920cc Inline six cylinder ohc engine with ”Kompressor”

Dimensions
- Wheelbase: 3,630 mm (143 in)
- Length: 4,960 mm (195 in)
- Width: 1,780 mm (70 in)
- Height: 1,950 mm (77 in)

Chronology
- Successor: Mercedes-Benz W08

Mercedes-Benz 15/70/100 PS / Typ 400
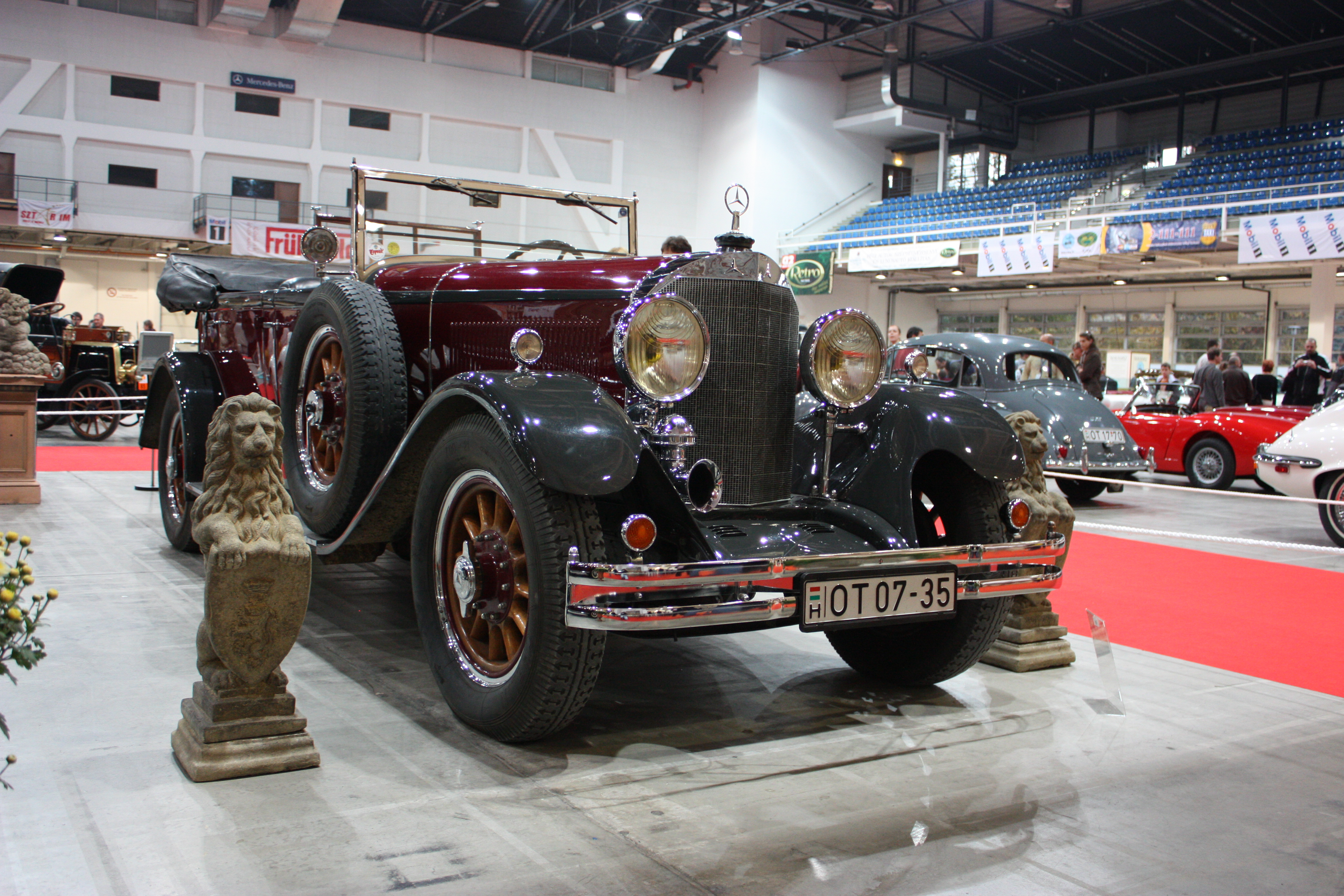

The Mercedes 15/70/100 PS was a large automobile introduced by Daimler in 1924. Production continued till 1929 by which time Daimler had merged with Benz & Cie (effective 1926) as a result of which the car's name had changed to Mercedes-Benz Typ 400.

A defining feature of the car was the switchable supercharger (”Kompressor”) fitted to the engine.

== Origins ==
Plans for the car were drawn up by the company's Technical Director, Paul Daimler, son of the company's founder. Following an acrimonious disagreement about new model policy, Daimler left in 1922, transferring to rival manufacturer Horch. It was left to Daimler's successor as Technical Director to complete the development and handle the launch of the 15/70/100 PS. The strategy for the model's development appears to have been similar under both men, however, based on the company's successful racing cars, and using knowledge gained on the race track to develop a large fast (and very expensive) road car.

== Naming conventions and horsepower ==
Daimler had been branding their passenger cars with the "Mercedes" name since 1902. For their model names at this time the manufacturer applied the widely followed German naming conventions of the time. On Daimler's Mercedes 15/70/100 PS the “15” defined the car's tax horsepower, used by the authorities to determine the level of annual car tax to be imposed on car owners. The “70” and the “100” both defined the manufacturer's claims regarding car's actual power output as defined in metric horsepower.

In Germany tax horsepower, which had been defined by statute since 1906, was based on the dimensions of the cylinders in the engine. Unlike the systems used elsewhere in Europe, the German tax horsepower calculation took account both of the cylinder bore and of the cylinder stroke, and there was therefore a direct linear relationship between engine size and tax horsepower.

The unusual feature in the naming of this car was the inclusion of two different power output figures. This arose from the fitting to the engine of a switchable supercharger (”Kompressor”). With the device switched off maximum claimed output was of 70 PS (51 kW; 69 hp). With the supercharger invoked, maximum output rose to 100 PS (74 kW; 99 hp).

The Mercedes 15/70/100 PS survived the fusion of Daimler with Benz & Cie which came into effect in 1926 (although the agreement which defined the merger had been signed two years earlier in 1924). However, cars of the newly merged company were now branded “Mercedes-Benz” and the model also acquired the new model name “Typ 400”, being now known as the Mercedes-Benz Typ 400 The alternative name Mercedes-Benz 15/70/100 PS was and is also sometimes used.

== The car ==
=== Bodies ===
Many buyers will have purchased the car in bare chassis form and purchased bodywork separately from an independent coach builder. The manufacturer's listed body types were a four or (from 1925) six seater Torpedo bodied “Tourenwagen”, a six-seater ”Pullman-Limousine”, a six-seater “Landaulet”, a six-seater “Coupe-Limousine” and a 4-door four seater Cabriolet.

=== The engine ===
The six cylinder in-line 3920 cc engine featured an overhead camshaft which at the time was an unusual feature, with “bevel linkage”. However, it was the switchable supercharger (”Kompressor”), adopted from the company's racing cars, that attracted most of the attention. With the device switched off maximum claimed output was of 70 PS (51 kW; 69 hp) at 3,100 rpm: with the supercharger operating, maximum output rose to 100 PS (74 kW; 99 hp).

The top speed listed was 105 km/h (65 mph) or 112 km/h (70 mph) according to which of the two offered final drive ratios was fitted.

=== Chassis and running gear ===
Power was transmitted to the rear wheels via a multi-plate dry disc clutch (“Mehrscheibentrockenkupplung”) and a four speed manual transmission. The gear lever was initially to the driver's right, directly outside the door, but at some stage it was repositioned to what has subsequently become a more conventional location in the middle of the floor to the driver's left. (At this time it was still normal, if no longer universal, in western Europe for the steering wheel and therefore also the driver to be placed on the right side of the car.)

The suspension configuration followed the conventions of the time, using rigid beam axles and semi-elliptic leaf springs. Braking operated on all four wheels using a cable linkage.

== Evolution ==
The car changed very little during its production life. The name change to Mercedes-Benz Typ 400 which followed the Daimler/Benz fusion was not accompanied by any changes to the car. However, in 1927 the centre of gravity was lowered as a result of a switch to an “underslung” chassis which left the axles directly above the longitudinal chassis members, whereas earlier car had applied the “Hochbett” overslung chassis layout whereby the longitudinal chassis members were attached directly above the axles.

In 1928 the effectiveness of the brakes was increased through the addition of a vacuum powered support (“Saugluftunterstützung”).

== Commercial ==
Before the mid-1926 merger Daimler produced 1002 of the Mercedes branded cars: following the merger which created “Mercedes-Benz” a further 911 of the cars, now badged as Mercedes-Benz products, were produced. A customised version of the car was made for the tenor Richard Tauber.

== Replacement ==
The car's replacement, designed in some haste under the auspices of the newly created company, was the Mercedes-Benz Typ Nürburg 460 (W08), which was much more aggressively priced and sold in greater numbers (nearly 4,000) albeit during a period which included several years of strong growth in the overall size of the German passenger car market.

== Sources and further reading ==
- Oswald, Werner: Mercedes-Benz Personenwagen 1886–1986, Motorbuch-Verlag Stuttgart 1987, ISBN 3613011336
- Oswald, Werner (2001). Deutsche Autos 1920-1945, Band (vol) 2 (in German). Motorbuch Verlag. ISBN 3-613-02170-6.

This entry incorporates information from the equivalent German Wikipedia entry.

- 1925 Mercedes 15/70/100
