= Mercedes-Benz M150 engine =

Mercedes-Benz M150

Overview
- Manufacturer: Mercedes-Benz
- Production: 1938-1944

Layout
- Configuration: Straight-eight
- Displacement: 7.7 L (470 cu in)
- Cylinder bore: 95 mm (3.7 in)
- Piston stroke: 135 mm (5.3 in)
- Valvetrain: 16-valve, DOHC, two valves per cylinder
- Compression ratio: 6.1:1

Combustion
- Supercharger: Roots-type supercharger
- Fuel system: Carburetor
- Oil system: Dry sump

Output
- Power output: 231 hp (172 kW)
- Torque output: 527.5 lb⋅ft (715 N⋅m)

Chronology
- Predecessor: Mercedes-Benz M07 engine

The Mercedes-Benz M150 engine is a naturally-aspirated and supercharged, 7.7-liter, straight-8 engine, designed, developed and produced by Mercedes-Benz from 1938 to 1944.

== Applications ==
- Mercedes-Benz 770 Großer (W150)
