= Mercedes-Benz M21 engine =

Mercedes-Benz M21

Overview
- Manufacturer: Mercedes-Benz
- Production: 1933–1936

Layout
- Configuration: Straight-six
- Displacement: 2.0 L (122 cu in)
- Cylinder bore: 70 mm (2.8 in)
- Piston stroke: 85 mm (3.3 in)
- Valvetrain: 12-valve, SOHC, two-valves per cylinder
- Compression ratio: 5.75:1

Combustion
- Fuel system: Carburetor
- Fuel type: Gasoline
- Oil system: Dry sump

Output
- Power output: 40 hp (30 kW)
- Torque output: 83 lb⋅ft (113 N⋅m)

The Mercedes-Benz M21 engine is a naturally-aspirated, 2.0-liter, straight-6, internal combustion piston engine, designed, developed and produced by Mercedes-Benz; between 1933 and 1936.

== M21 Engine ==
The side-valve six-cylinder engine had a capacity of 1,961 cc which produced a claimed maximum output of 40 PS (29 kW; 39 hp) at 3,200 rpm. The engine shared its 85 mm (3.3 in) piston stroke length with the smaller 6-cylinder unit fitted in the manufacturer's W15 model, but for the W21 the bore was increased by 5 mm (0.20 in) to 70 mm (2.8 in). The stated top speed was 98 km/h (61 mph) for the standard length and 95 km/h (59 mph) for the long bodied cars. Power from the engine passed to the rear wheels through a four-speed manual transmission in which the top gear was effectively an overdrive ratio. The top two ratios featured synchromesh. The brakes operated on all four wheels via a hydraulic linkage.

During the model's final year, Mercedes-Benz announced, in June 1936, the option of a more powerful 2,229 cc 55 PS (40 kW; 54 hp) engine, which was seen as a necessary response to criticism of the car's leisurely performance in long bodied form.

== Applications ==
- Mercedes-Benz W21
