= Mercedes-Benz M18 engine =

Mercedes-Benz M18

Overview
- Manufacturer: Mercedes-Benz
- Production: 1933-1937

Layout
- Configuration: Inline-6
- Displacement: 2.9 L (177 cu in)
- Cylinder bore: 78 mm (3.1 in)
- Piston stroke: 100 mm (3.9 in)
- Valvetrain: 12-valve, SOHC, two-valves per cylinder
- Compression ratio: 5.75:1

Combustion
- Fuel system: Carburetor
- Fuel type: Gasoline
- Oil system: Dry sump

Output
- Power output: 60 hp (45 kW)
- Torque output: 100–103 lb⋅ft (136–140 N⋅m)

The Mercedes-Benz M18 engine is a naturally-aspirated, 2.9-liter, straight-6, internal combustion piston engine, designed, developed and produced by Mercedes-Benz; between 1933 and 1937.

== M18 Engine ==
The six-cylinder 2,867 cc side-valve engine produced a maximum output of 60 PS (44 kW; 59 hp) at 3,200 rpm. In 1935 the compression ratio was increased along with maximum power which was now given as 68 PS (50 kW; 67 hp). Power was delivered to the rear wheels via a four-speed manual transmission with synchromesh on the top two ratios.

== Applications ==
- Mercedes-Benz W18
