= Mercedes-Benz M07 engine =

Mercedes-Benz M07

Overview
- Manufacturer: Mercedes-Benz
- Production: 1930-1938

Layout
- Configuration: Straight-eight
- Displacement: 7.7 L (470 cu in)
- Cylinder bore: 95 mm (3.7 in)
- Piston stroke: 135 mm (5.3 in)
- Valvetrain: 16-valve, DOHC, two valves per cylinder
- Compression ratio: 4.7:1

Combustion
- Fuel system: Carburetor
- Oil system: Dry sump

Output
- Power output: 150–200 hp 112–149 kW
- Torque output: 281–375 lb⋅ft 381–508 N⋅m

Chronology
- Successor: Mercedes-Benz M150 engine

The Mercedes-Benz M07 engine is a naturally-aspirated and supercharged, 7.7-liter, straight-8 engine, designed, developed and produced by Mercedes-Benz from 1930 through 1938.

== Applications ==
- Mercedes-Benz 770 Großer (W07)
