= Mercedes-Benz W143 =

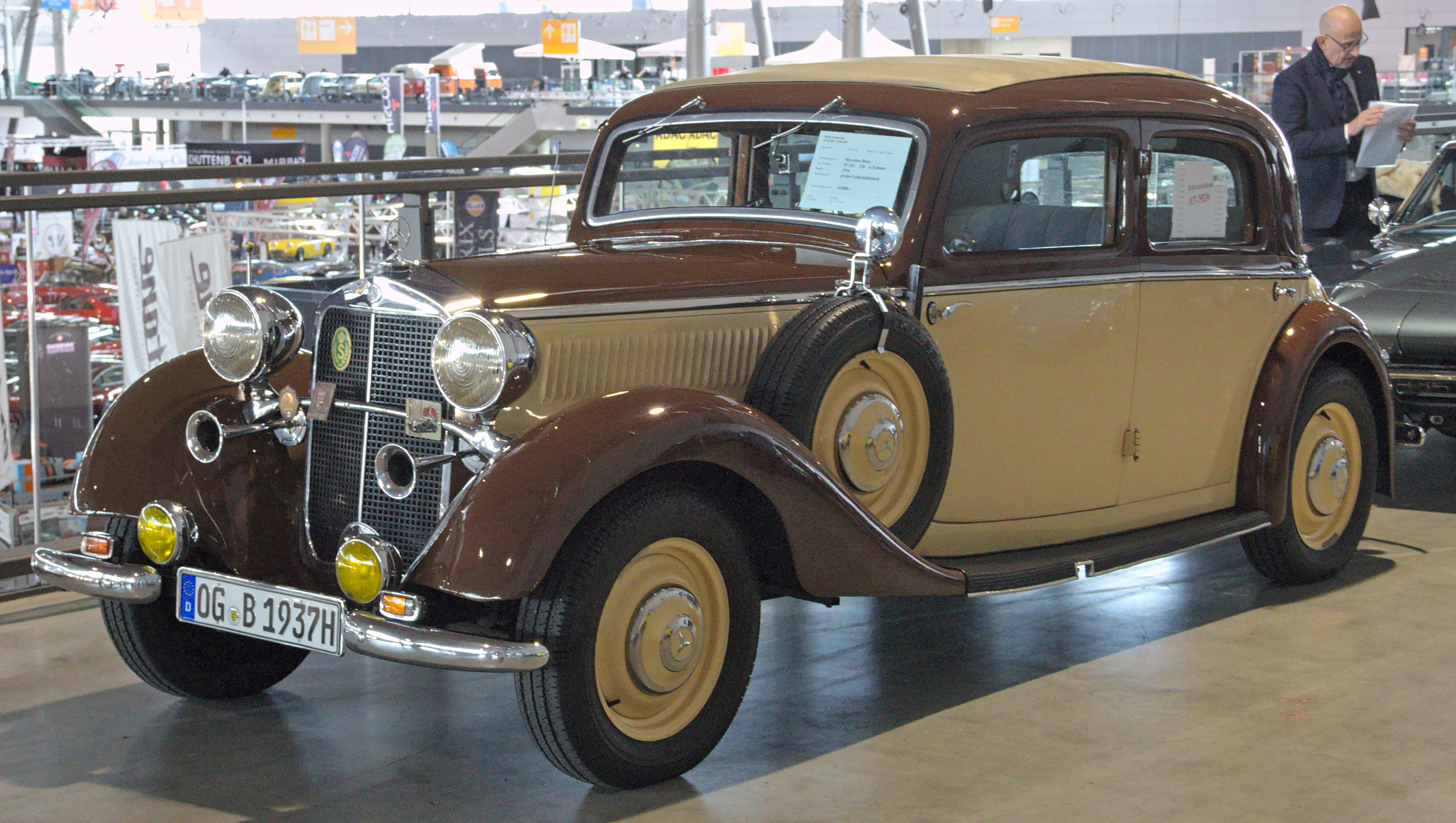
- 1936 Mercedes-Benz 230

Overview
- Manufacturer: Mercedes-Benz
- Also called: Mercedes-Benz Typ(e) 230
- Production: 1937–1941; 20,336 produced
- Assembly: Germany: Stuttgart

Body and chassis
- Class: Mid-size
- Body style: 2 or 4-door ”Limousine” (sedan); Cabriolet “A” (2/3-seats); Cabriolet “B” (2-doors / 4-seats); Cabriolet “D” (4-doors / 4 seats); Pullman-Limousine (6 seats); Landaulet (6 seats ) Tourenwagen (6 seats)
- Layout: FR layout

Powertrain
- Engine: 2,229 cc M143 I6

Dimensions
- Wheelbase: 2,700 mm (110 in); 1937 3,050 mm (120 in); 1937 - 1941
- Length: 4,400–4,790 mm (173–189 in)
- Width: 1,710 mm (67 in)

Chronology
- Predecessor: Mercedes-Benz W21
- Successor: Mercedes-Benz W153

The Mercedes-Benz Typ 230 n was introduced by Mercedes-Benz in 1937 as a successor to the Typ 230 (W 21). It was one of several models over the space of nearly eight decades to be sold with a name along the lines "Mercedes-Benz 230", and is therefore in retrospect more normally named according to its internal works designation as the Mercedes-Benz W 143.

== Mercedes-Benz Typ 230 n (1937) ==
The car was initially built with the same 2,700 mm (110 in) wheelbase as the Typ 200 (W 21). It also inherited the sophisticated all-round independent suspension system originally introduced with the manufacturer's smaller Mercedes-Benz W15 model. There was no full width axle at the front, the wheels being suspended from two transverse leaf springs. At the back there were two half swing-axles.

The body was further lengthened, however, with standard-bodied cars now coming in at 4,400 mm (170 in), while the width had increased to 1,370 mm (54 in). The 6-cylinder 2,229 cc unit was the one that had first been seen a year earlier as part of the 1936 upgrade on the W 21 model, but now it was matched up to a more conventional four-speed manual transmission. The top ratio on the 2,229 cc version of the earlier model had been in effect an overdrive. Claimed top speed was 116 km/h (72 mph).

At launch the base chassis version of the car came with a recommended retail price of 4,200 Marks. Customers wishing to buy a W 143 with one of the Mercedes standard bodies could choose between a two- or four-door “Limousine” (saloon/sedan) retailing respectively at 4,990 Marks or 5,270 Marks, or one of several cabriolet or roadster models, mostly with only two seats and costing more. The grille was raked backwards and, on the standard car, had no bar for the mounting of lights, all of which helped to enhance the sleek appearance of the front.

The result of putting a 4,400 mm (170 in) car body on the old 2,700 mm (110 in) was one or two very long overhangs: in the case of the 1937 W143 the overhang was concentrated at the back. Whether because the excessive rear overhang looked rather odd, or for other reasons, the original W 143 failed to gain market acceptance, and although the short-wheelbase cars continued to be offered for sale until the end of 1937, well before that the model had effectively been relaunched with the longer 3,050 mm (120 in) wheelbase that had already been offered on special long-wheelbase version of the Mercedes Typ 200 (W 21) for several years.

== Mercedes-Benz Typ 230 (1937–1941) ==
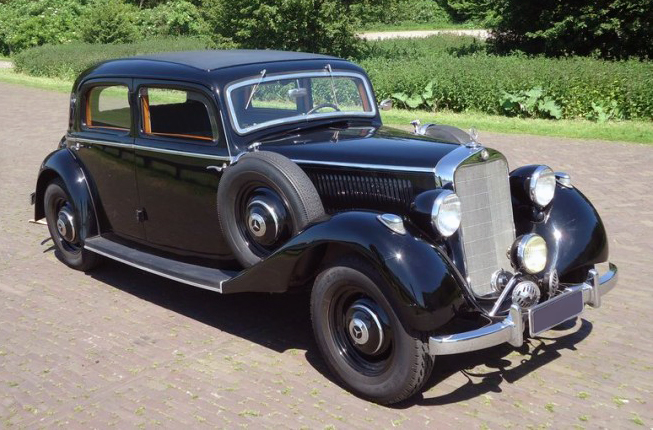
1938 Mercedes-Benz 230 sedan (W143)

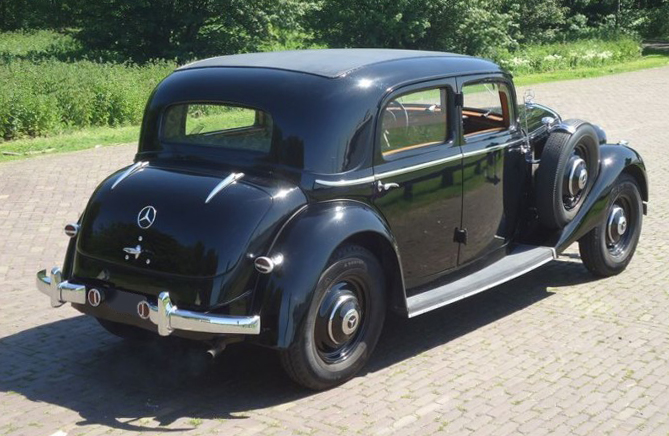

In addition to having a wheelbase lengthened by 350 mm (14 in), the relaunched W143 came with a further 180 mm (7.1 in) increase in body length. Most standard-bodied cars were now 4,580 mm (180 in) long, although the six-light Pullman-Limousine-bodied cars were longer even than that at 4,790 mm (189 in). There was no longer a two-door “Limousine” (sedan/saloon) body offered, but the overall range of available bodies was actually greater than with the earlier version of the car, now including six-seater “Landaulet” and “Tourenwagen (Touring Car)” bodies as well as a four-door four-seater cabriolet (known as the “Cabriolet D”) and a “Kraftdroschke” targeted at taxi operators.

The engine on the second 1937 version of the car was unchanged, as were the gear ratios. However, the gearbox now incorporated synchromesh on all four forward ratios, whereas the earlier W143 had included synchromesh only for the two top ratios.

=== Diesel sibling ===
The Mercedes-Benz 260 D, launched in 1936 as one of the world's first two diesel-engined passenger cars, also underwent a significant upgrade in 1937. The new car shared the wheelbase and platform as well as most of the body options of the W143, but the diesel-powered car had a different works number. It was known as the Mercedes-Benz W138.

=== Commercial ===
The Mercedes-Benz 143 remained in production until 1941, although only 22 were produced in the final year.

Between 1936 and 1941 Mercedes-Benz produced 20,336 of the cars, making it their second most popular model to date, albeit far behind their top seller of the time, the smaller W136.

The car's intended successor was presumably the Mercedes-Benz W153 which came with the same engine but a much more modern body. That car's production run was truncated by the intervention of war, but after the war, in 1951, the manufacturer returned to the market for six-cylinder saloons and cabriolets with the Mercedes-Benz 220.
