= Mercedes-Benz MB507 engine =

Mercedes-Benz MB507

Overview
- Manufacturer: Mercedes-Benz
- Production: 1944

Layout
- Configuration: 60° V12
- Displacement: 42.35–44.5 L (2,584–2,716 cu in)
- Cylinder bore: 6.22–6.38 in (158.0–162.1 mm)
- Piston stroke: 7.09 in (180.1 mm)
- Valvetrain: 24-valve, SOHC, two-valves per cylinder
- Compression ratio: 17.0:1

Combustion
- Fuel system: Fuel injection
- Fuel type: Diesel
- Oil system: Dry sump
- Cooling system: Water-cooled

Output
- Power output: 1,200 hp (895 kW)
- Torque output: 2,630 lb⋅ft (3,566 N⋅m)

Dimensions
- Dry weight: 790–920 kg (1,742–2,028 lb)

The Mercedes-Benz MB 507 was a four-stroke, naturally-aspirated, V-12 diesel marine engine; derived from the MB 503 gasoline engine. The MB 507 was also based on the Daimler-Benz DB 603 inverted V-12 aircraft engine, and shared an identical bore, stroke, and displacement. Unlike the gasoline-powered MB 503, the diesel-powered MB 507 did not use a supercharger.

== Applications ==
- Panzer VIII Maus V2
- Karl Gerät
