= Mercedes-Benz Ponton =

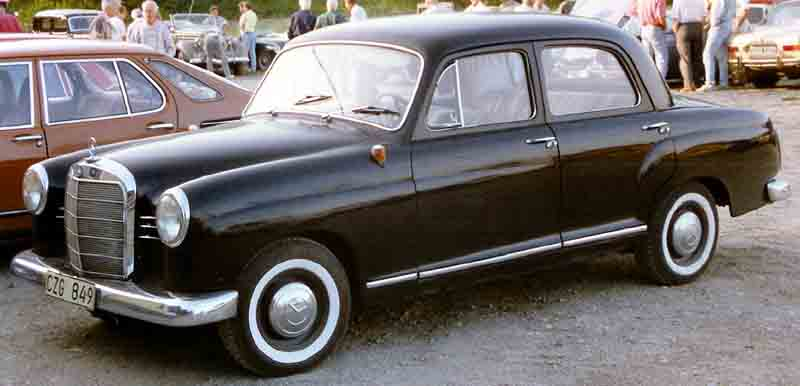
- The 'Ponton' range, starting with the 1953 W120 model 180, were Mercedes' main models until 1959.

Overview
- Manufacturer: Mercedes-Benz
- Production: 1953–1963
- Assembly: West Germany: Stuttgart; Australia: Port Melbourne; South Africa: East London, Eastern Cape
- Designer: Fritz Nallinger

Body and chassis
- Class: Mid-size executive/luxury car; Mid-size coupe / cabriolet
- Body style: 4-Door Sedan; 4-Door Limousine; 2-Door Coupe; 2-Door Convertible
- Layout: FR layout
- Related: Mercedes-Benz W120 / W121; Mercedes-Benz W105; Mercedes-Benz W128; Mercedes-Benz W180

Powertrain
- Engine: 2,195 cc (2.2 L) M127 I6; 2,195 cc (2.2 L) M180 I6; 1,897 cc (1.9 L) M121 I4; 1,767 cc (1.8 L) M136 I4; 1,697 cc (1.7 L) OM636 I4; 1,897 cc (1.9 L) OM621 I4

Chronology
- Predecessor: Mercedes-Benz W136; Mercedes-Benz W191; Mercedes-Benz W187
- Successor: Mercedes-Benz W110; Mercedes-Benz W111

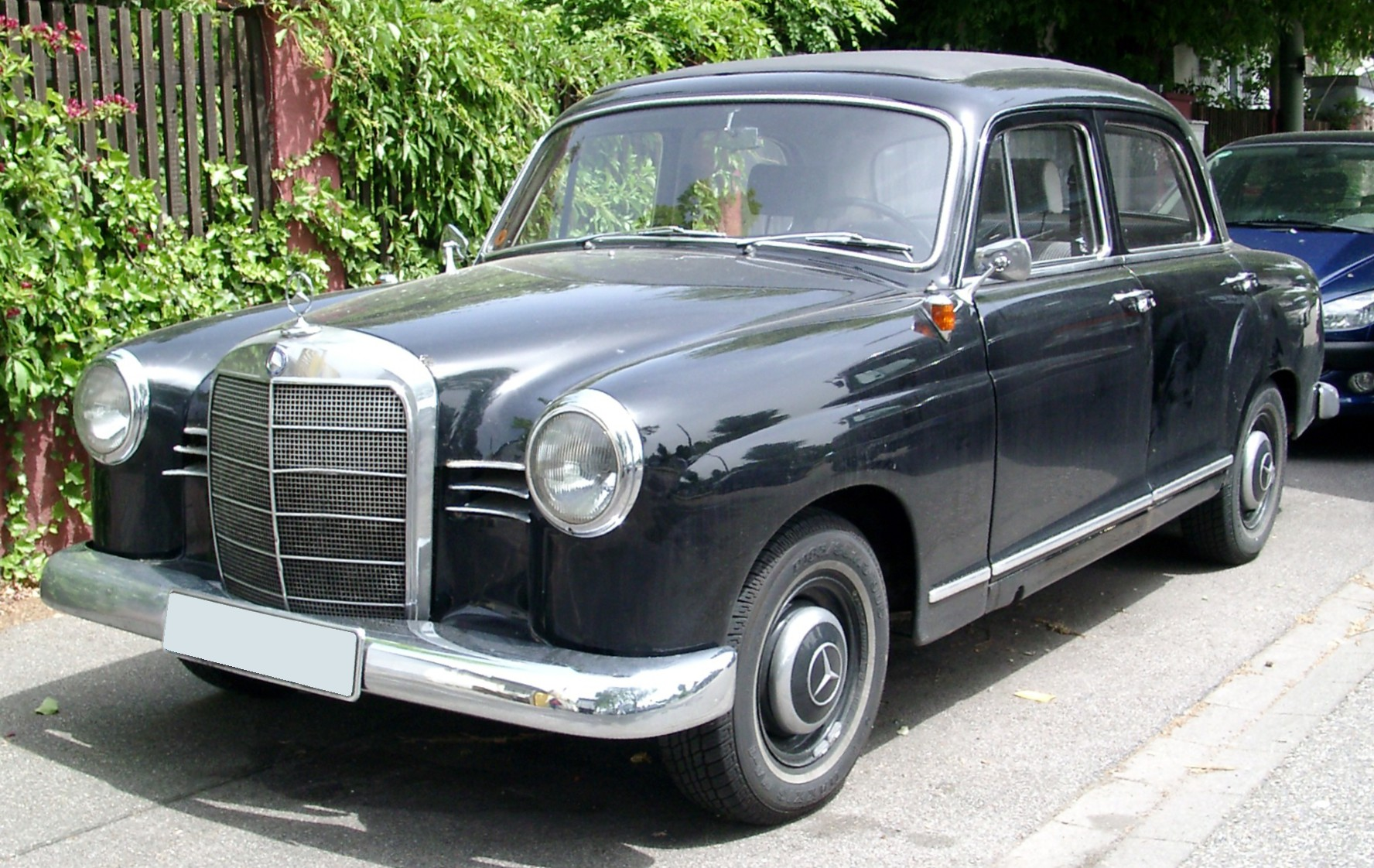
The Mercedes-Benz W120 / W121 had a soft, open roof option.

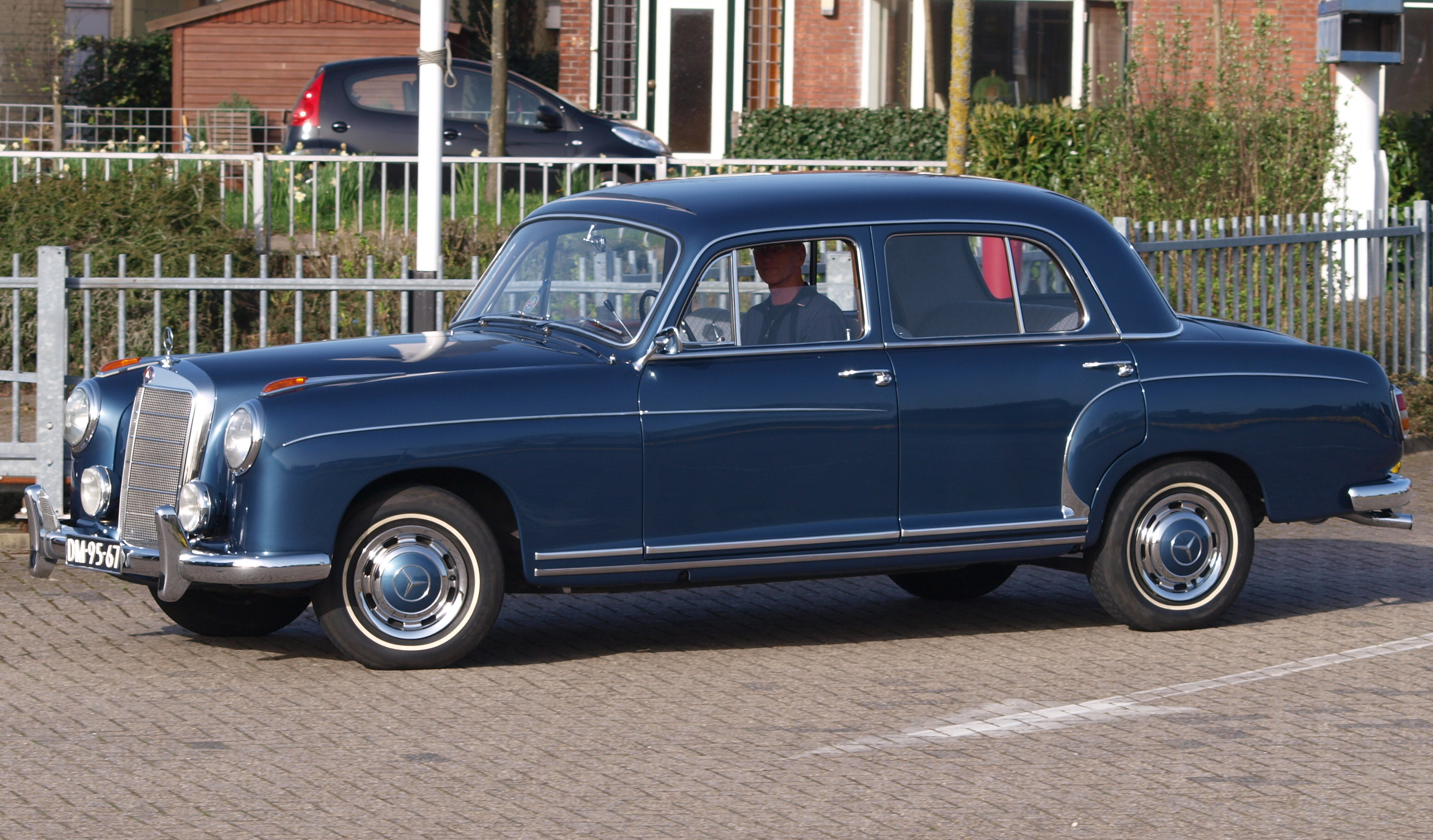
The Mercedes-Benz 220 S looked very similar to the shorter 4-cylinders

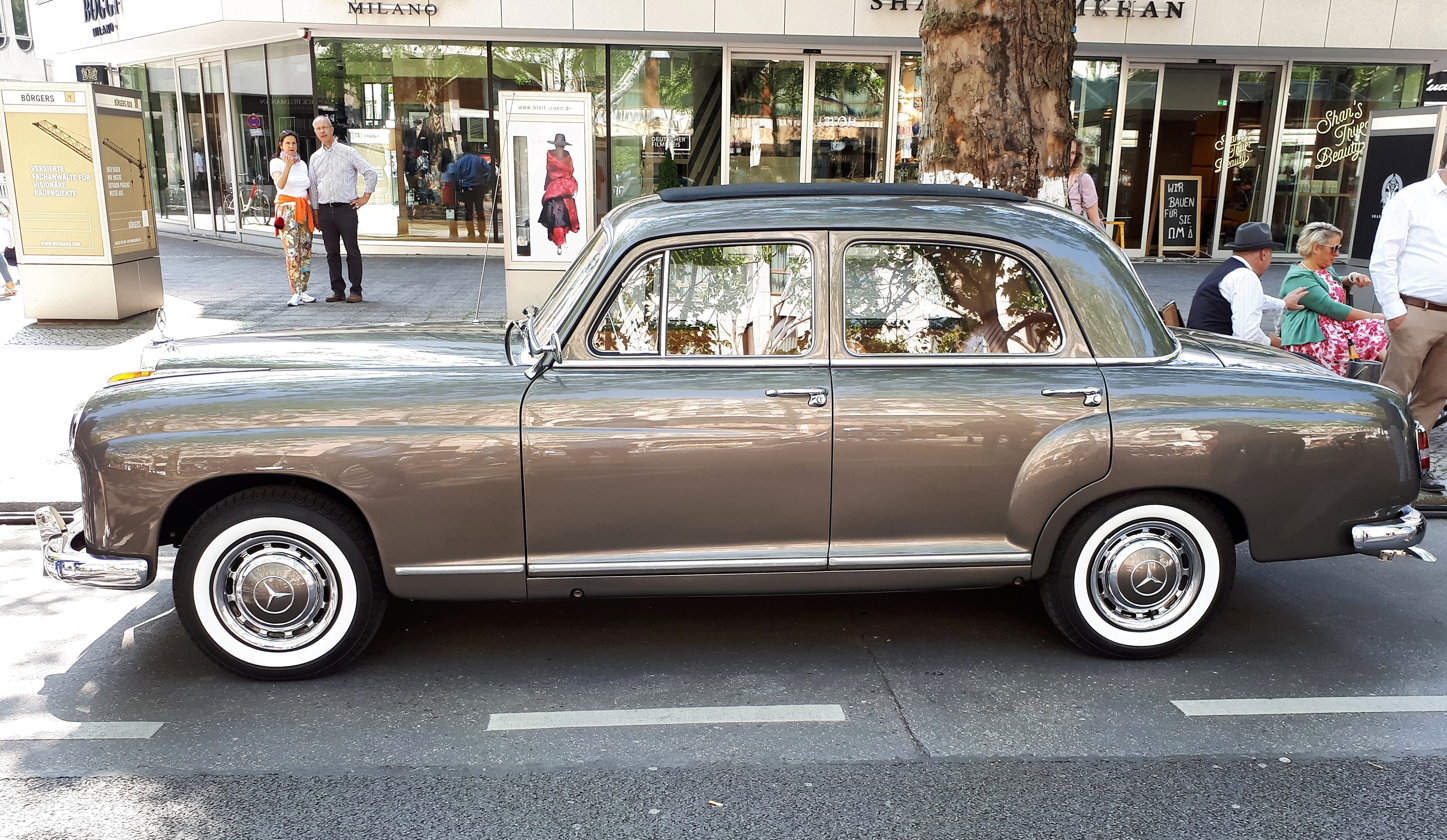
After the luxury six-cylinder 220a, the intermediate model 219 combined the same stretched nose with the four-cylinder's shorter passenger cell.

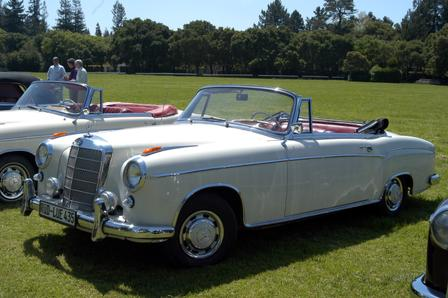
1957 Mercedes-Benz W180 220S "Ponton" Cabriolet

The Mercedes-Benz "Ponton" series is a range of sedans / saloon car models from Mercedes-Benz, introduced starting in 1953, and subsequently nicknamed 'Ponton' (the German word for "pontoon"), referring to its ponton styling, a prominent styling trend that unified the previously articulated hood, body, fenders and runnings boards into a singular, often slab-sided envelope. At the time, Mercedes itself did not refer to any of its cars using the nickname.

Mercedes stretched the 'Ponton' saloons into a range that became the automaker's dominant production models until 1959.

The 1953 W120 180 four-cylinder sedans were Mercedes' second totally new series of passenger cars since World War II, following the 1951 introduction of the top of the range W186 300 “Adenauer”, and replaced the pre-war-designed W136 170 and 170 S. Contrasting very visibly with the traditional distinct fenders on that body-on-frame model and the ones before it, the 'Pontons' were Mercedes' first monocoque, unitary body production models.

Mercedes expanded the base Ponton model into a diversified line, developing multiple series based on the 180, by introducing more engines and stretching the body. Six-cylinder models received a longer nose, and 'S'-models also had a longer passenger compartment, offering more legroom. A six-cylinder coupe and convertible were further derived, and a shortened floorpan of the four-cylinder sedan was also modified to serve as the structure for the W121 190 SL roadster.

The 'Ponton' saloons were the automaker's main production models until 1959, adding up to 80% of Mercedes-Benz car production between 1953 and 1959, with some models lasting until 1962. The range was succeeded by the range of "Heckflosse" (or "Fintail") models.

== Design history ==
Daimler-Benz emerged from World War II as a carmaker best known in the early 1950s for its expensive Mercedes-Benz 300 Adenauers and exclusive 300 S sports tourers. Both were largely handbuilt body on frame vehicles. Its low end was anchored by the dated pre-war designed 170.

Seeking to expand its production, Mercedes turned toward the unibody concept to design a line of mass-produced cars. Work began in earnest on the pontons bodied cars in 1951, with a design focused on passenger comfort and safety. Head of the design team was Dr. Fritz Nallinger. Styling was headed by Karl Wilfert. Also in the design team was Béla Barényi, who conceived the passive safety (crash protection) engineering of the body.

The first of the 'Ponton' models to go into production was the 1953 W120 180, 1.8 L (110 cu in) four-cylinder, four-door sedan, available as the 180 petrol and the 180D diesel. In 1954 the W180 six-cylinder executive / luxury model 220a was added, developed mostly by stretching the W120's body by 170 mm (6.7 in), complemented by a new rear suspension, and giving it the longer straight six M180 engine. The added length was divided between 100 mm (3.9 in) added forward of the firewall to accommodate the two cylinder larger engine, and 70 mm (2.8 in) to the rear seating area for additional legroom; the boots stayed the same. In 1956, the six-cylinder model was expanded into an entire range. The 220a gained a second carburetor and was upgraded to become the 220S, shortly joined in the line by new distinctively bodied, shorter wheelbase two-door coupe and convertible models. A third saloon series, the W105 219 was created by grafting the six-cylinder nose onto the shorter body of the four-cylinder from the firewall aft.

In 1956, the four-cylinder model also received an all new, short-stroke 1.9 L (120 cu in) petrol engine option, the W121 model 190, joined in 1958 by a 1.9 litre diesel.

In 1958, the 220S models were upgraded with fuel injection, and became the W128 220 SE series. The models 180 D and 190 D received further updates in 1959 and 1961.

== Designed in safety ==
Austrian-Hungarian engineer Béla Barényi originally invented and patented the crumple zone concept in 1937 before he worked for Mercedes-Benz, and in a more developed form in 1952. Barény questioned the prevailing opinion until then, that a safe car had to be rigid. He divided the car body into three sections: the central, rigid, non-deforming passenger compartment, and the crumple zones in the front and the rear. They are designed to absorb the energy of an impact (kinetic energy) by deformation during collision.

The 1953 W120 "Ponton" partially implemented the concepts of crumple zones and the non-deformable passenger cell into its "three-box design" by having a strong deep platform to form a partial safety cell (patented in 1941). The Mercedes-Benz crumple zones patent (number 854157) granted in 1952, describes the decisive feature of passive safety. The first Mercedes-Benz car developed, fully using this patent was the 1959 successor, the W111 “Fintail” Saloon.

The 'Ponton's design concept was proven by ADAC crash test facility in June, 2010 when a Mercedes Ponton was crash tested in their Technical Centre in Landsberg am Lech, confirming the existence of the design incorporated into the vehicle. This made for a milestone in car design with front and rear crumple zones for absorbing kinetic energy on impact.

The safety cell and crumple zones were achieved primarily by the design of the longitudinal members: these were straight in the centre of the vehicle and formed a rigid safety cage with the body panels, whereas the front and rear supports were curved, so they deformed in the event of an accident, absorbing part of the collision energy and preventing the full force of the impact from reaching the occupants.

== Models and types ==
There were essentially five models of Ponton bodies on four different wheelbases: three wheelbase length saloons, plus a coupe and cabriolet version on a shortened six-cylinder body. Note the "D" designates a diesel engine, and the suffix "b" and/or "c" are body variants introduced after the middle of 1959.

- Four-cylinder sedans — 265 cm (104.3 in) wheelbase
  - 1953–1962 W120 petrol — 180, 180a, 180b, 180c
  - 1953–1962 W120 diesel — 180D, 180Db, 180Dc
  - 1956–1961 W121 — 190, 190b, 190d, 190Db
- Six-cylinder sedan — 275 cm (108.3 in) wheelbase
  - 1956–1959 W105 — 219
- Six-cylinder sedans — 282 cm (111 in) wheelbase
  - 1954–1959 W180 — 220a, 220S
  - 1958–1960 W128 — 220SE
- Six-cylinder coupés / cabriolets — 270 cm (106.3 in) wheelbase
  - 1956–1959 W180 — 220S
  - 1958–1960 W128 — 220SE

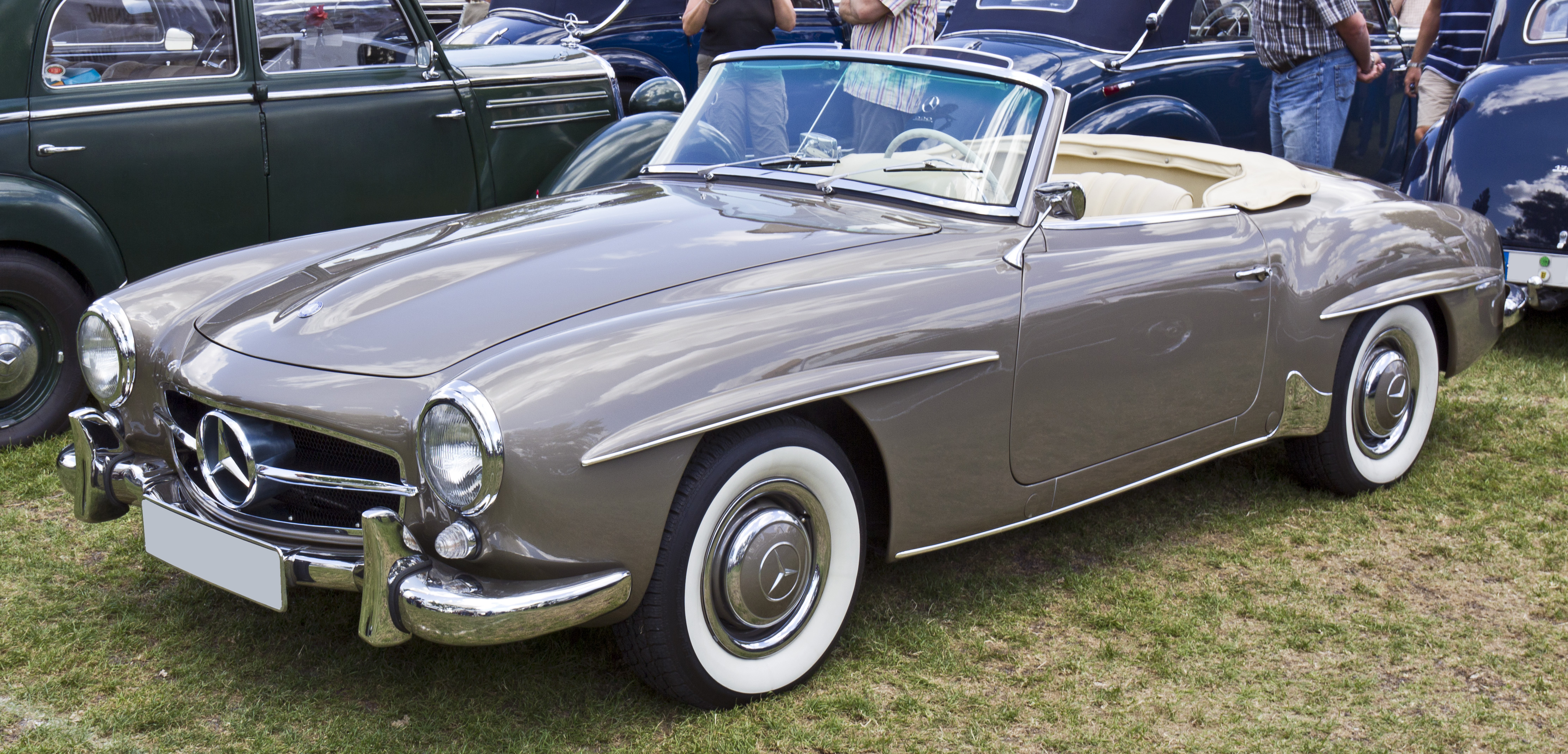
Mercedes-Benz 190SL roadster

The design of the 190 SL roadster differed completely from the Ponton sedans, copying much of the bodywork of the 300SL sportscar, and using the same suspension, but it was constructed on a shortened version of the W121 Ponton floorpan.

- Four-cylinder roadster with optional hardtop
  - 1955–1962 R121 — 190 SL

== Models and engines timeline ==
Model	1953	1954	1955	1956	1957	1958	1959	1960	1961	1962	1963
180	W120 M136										
180a					W120 M121						
180b							W120 M121				
180c									W120 M121		
180D	W120 OM636										
180Db							W120 OM636				
180Dc									W120 OM621		
190				W121 M121							
190b							W121 M121				
190D						W121 diesel					
190Db							W121 OM621				
190SL roadster			W121 M121								
219				W105 M180							
220a		W180 M180									
220S Sedan				W180 M180							
220SE Sedan						W128 M127					
220S Coupe/Cab				W180 M180							
220SE Coupe/Cab						W128 M127					

=== Sample specifications ===
A 1957 brochure provides a cross section of Ponton models then available:

- 180 — 52 PS (38 kW; 51 bhp), top speed 126 km/h (78 mph)
- 180D — 43 PS (32 kW; 42 bhp), top speed 110 km/h (68 mph)
- 190 — 75 PS (55 kW; 74 bhp), top speed 140 km/h (87 mph)
- 219 — 85 PS (63 kW; 84 bhp), top speed 148 km/h (92 mph)
- 220S — 100 PS (74 kW; 99 bhp), top speed 160 km/h (99 mph)
