= Mercedes-Benz 220SE =

Mercedes-Benz 220SE may refer to:

- Mercedes-Benz W128 (1958–1960) "Ponton"
- Mercedes-Benz W111 (1959–1965) as Mercedes-Benz 220SEb, "fin-body"
