= M180 =

M180 or M-180 may refer to:

- M180 motorway, a major road in England
- M-180 (Michigan highway), a former state highway in Michigan
- Mercedes-Benz M180 engine
