= Mercedes-Benz W187 =

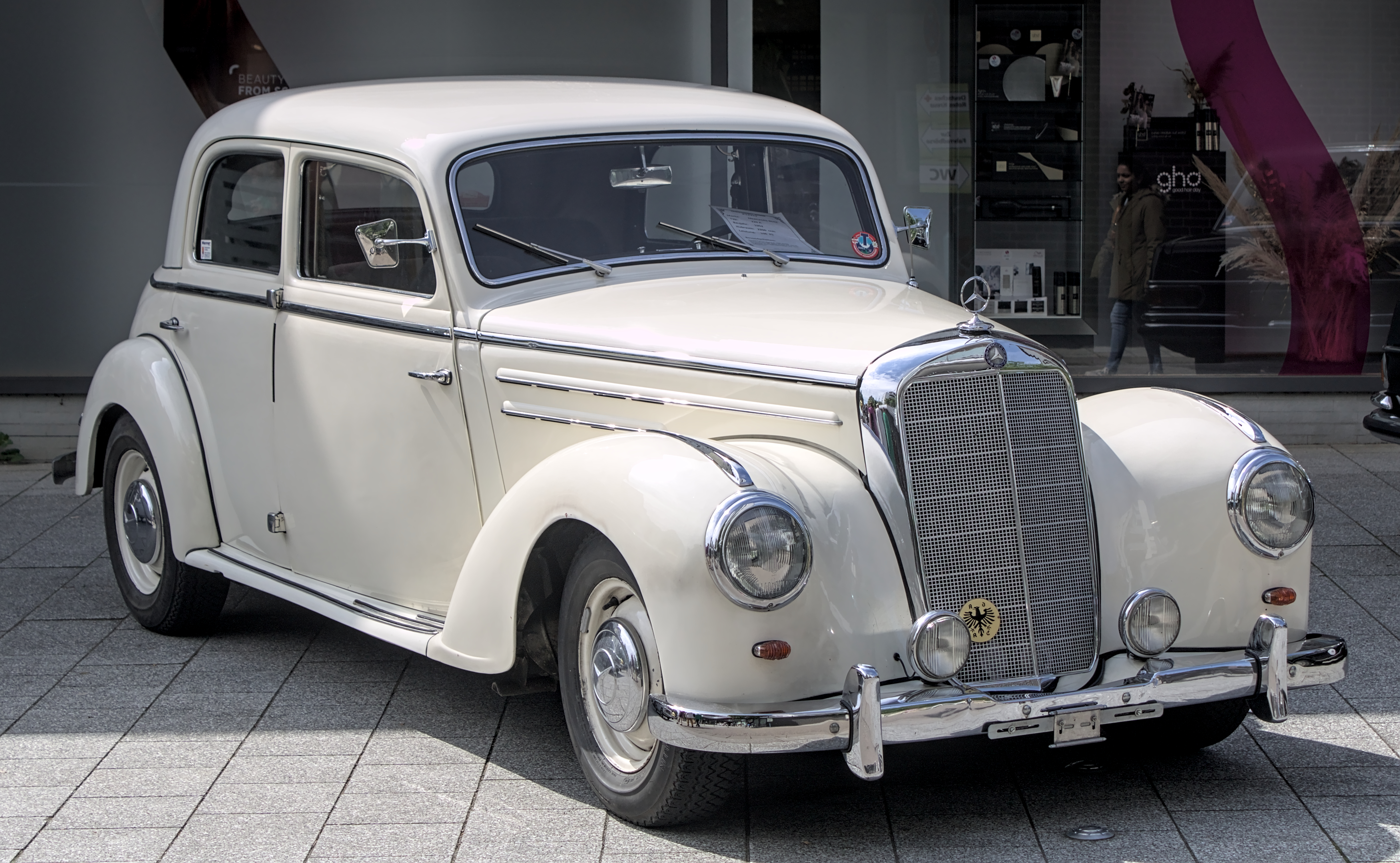
- Mercedes-Benz 220 Saloon W187

Overview
- Manufacturer: Mercedes-Benz
- Production: 1951–1955; 18,514 built Saloon: 16,154; Cabriolet A: 1,278; Cabriolet B: 997; Coupé: 85
- Assembly: West Germany: Stuttgart

Body and chassis
- Class: luxury car
- Body style: 1951–1954: 4 door saloon 1951–1954: 2-door "cabriolet B"; 1951–1955: 2-door "cabriolet A"; 1954–1955: 2 door coupé
- Layout: FR layout

Powertrain
- Engine: 2,195 cc (2.2 L) M180 I6
- Transmission: 4-speed manual

Dimensions
- Wheelbase: 2,845 mm (112.0 in)
- Length: 4,507 mm (177.4 in) - 4,538 mm (178.7 in)
- Width: 1,685 mm (66.3 in)

Chronology
- Predecessor: Mercedes-Benz W142
- Successor: Mercedes-Benz W105; Mercedes-Benz W180

The Mercedes-Benz W187 is a luxury car produced by Mercedes-Benz as a saloon, coupé, and cabriolet from 1951 to 1955. Designated the 220, it was powered by a single overhead camshaft inline six-cylinder M180 engine.

Initially a four-door sedan and two-door cabriolet were offered, with the sedan continuing through 1954 and the cabriolet through 1955. They were joined in 1954 by a two-door coupe, produced through 1955.

== History ==
The W187 was introduced at the Frankfurt Motor Show in April 1951.

Despite its pre-World War II reputation as a manufacturer of luxury cars, in the depressed immediate post-war years Mercedes-Benz had produced only four-cylinder-engined passenger cars. The W187 Mercedes-Benz 220 and flagship W186 Mercedes-Benz 300 Adenauer introduced together were the first Mercedes to once again feature six-cylinder engines.

The body of the W187 saloon bore a strong resemblance to the 1938 Mercedes-Benz W153, and despite the modern engine that powered it, already looked old fashioned to many observers on its introduction. Two years earlier, in 1949, the Borgward Hansa had served notice that car design had moved on since the 1930s, and the manufacturer's own 1953 W120 "Ponton" confirmed that "modern" European cars were following the North American trend to lower wider bodied designs. This has been seen as an explanation for the W187's own unusually short production run of slightly above three years for the saloon and less than five years for the longest lived of the Cabriolet models.

=== Models ===
The 220 sedan was similar in styling to the contemporary W136 Mercedes-Benz 170S, with the 170's freestanding headlights integrated into the fenders for a slightly more modern look. To handle the extra power in what was, by contemporary standards, a heavy car, the W187 was given duplex drum brakes.

Two different 2-door cabriolet models were built, similar to those offered in the W170 line, the "A" (an opulently styled roadster evoking the ultra-exclusive W188 300S) and "B" (a much plainer, dedicated 2+2 which closely resembled the 220 sedan). During 1953 the "Cabriolet A's" flat windscreen was replaced with a slightly curved screen. In December, a Coupé derived from it was announced for 1954. Fitted, as many were, with a steel sunroof, it was priced at 22,000 Marks, nearly twice the standard W187 sedan.

A total of 1,278 Cabriolet As, 997 Cabriolet Bs, and just 85 Coupés were sold.

Between August 1952 and May 1953, 41 special soft top OTP (Offener Tourenwagen Polizei, "Open Police Touring Car") bodied W187 220s were produced for the West German police.

=== Engines ===
All 220s used the newly developed M180 six cylinder 2.2 L; 133.9 cu in (2,195 cc) engine producing 79 hp; 59 kW (80 PS). In contrast with the rather old fashioned look of the car's body, the new engines attracted much attention in the motoring press, being the first new engine presented by Mercedes-Benz in more than ten years. The valves were operated by short rocker arms from an overhead camshaft. The engine was unusual in Europe at this time in having oversquare cylinder dimensions with a bore of 80.0mm and a stroke of only 72.8mm, which facilitated the design of an efficient reverse-flow cylinder head.

The manufacturer claimed a top speed of 87 mph (140 km/h) for the saloon and 90 mph (140 km/h) for the cabriolet, which was faster than the 51 hp; 38 kW (52 PS) powered 170S Cabriolet which the cabriolet version of the W187 replaced and from which its bodywork was derived. The new six-cylinder engine would form the basis for a long line of repeatedly enlarged and upgraded six-cylinder engines powering a wide range of Mercedes-Benz models, including the early W116 S-Class models in the 1970s.

In April 1954 the "Cabriolet A" and its Coupé derivative were fitted with a new higher compression 84 hp; 63 kW (85 PS) engine that had been developed for the soon to be announced Mercedes-Benz W180 "Ponton".

=== Replacement ===
The saloon was replaced by the W105 219/W180 220a and went out of production in May, 1954; the Cabriolet A and Coupé models continued for another 15 months until August 1955.

When the cabriolet was withdrawn in 1955 there was no immediate successor. However, just over a year later the all-new ponton styled Mercedes-Benz 220S Cabriolet and Coupé appeared, in July and October 1956 respectively.

== Gallery ==
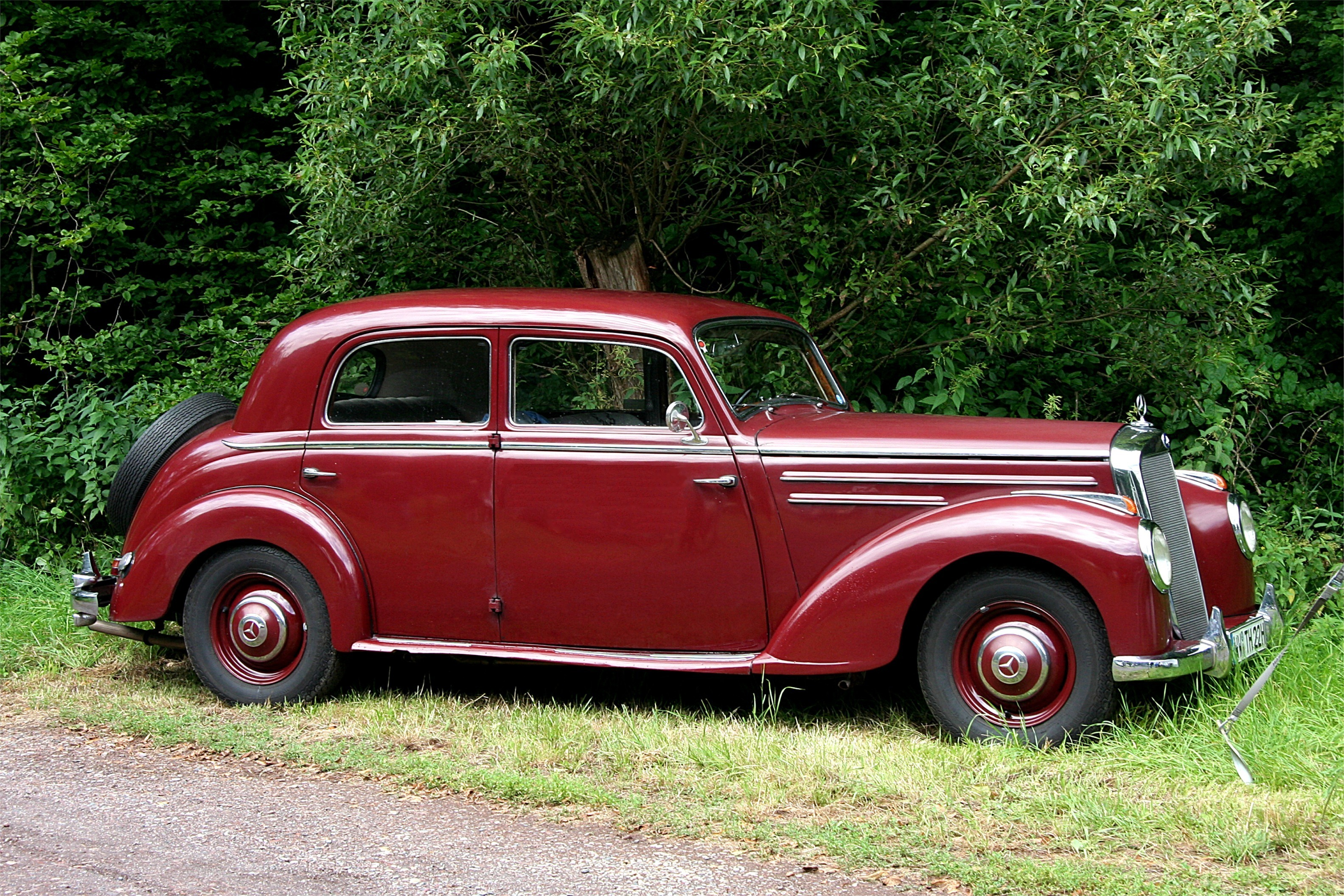
Mercedes-Benz 220 saloon (W187)

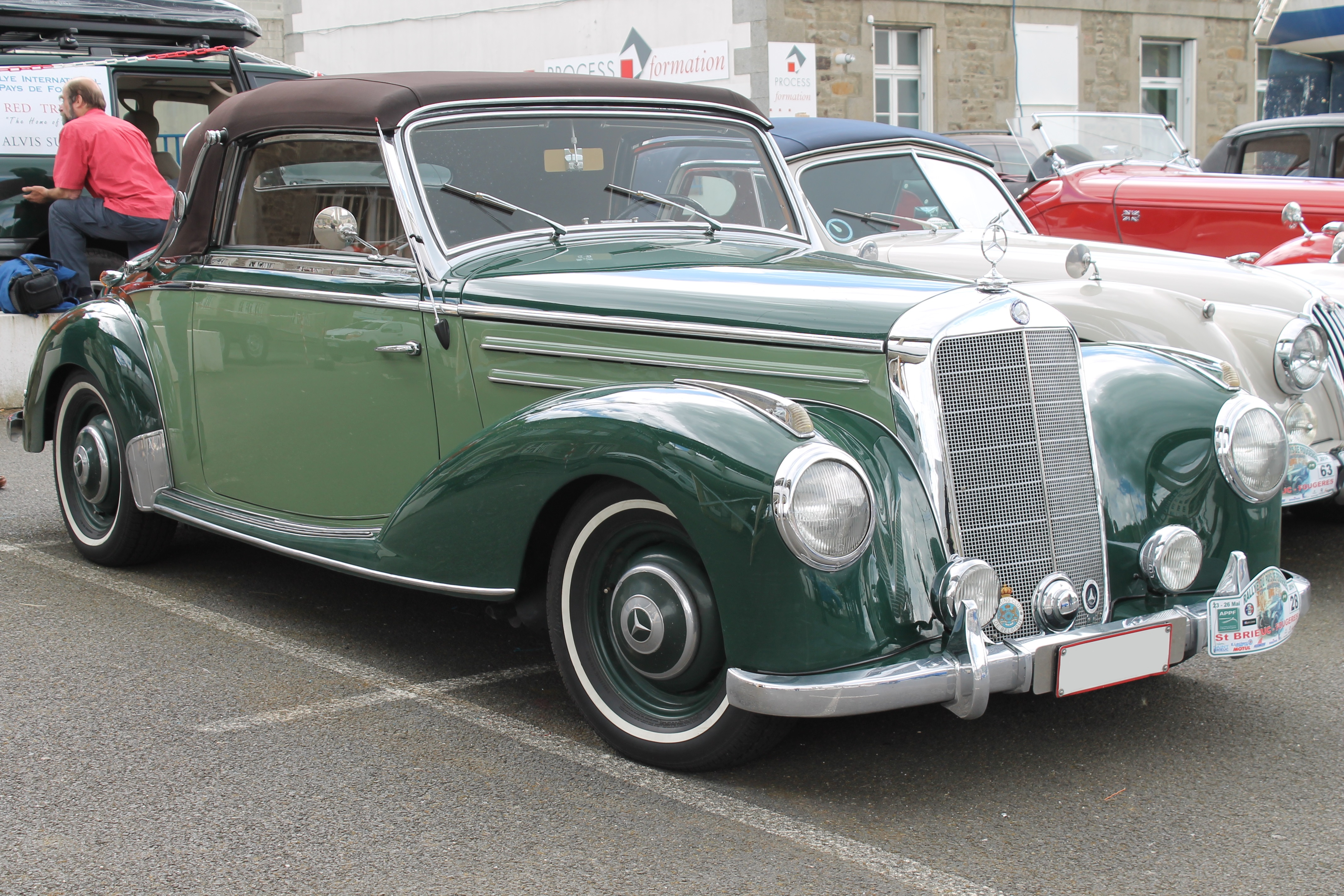
Mercedes-Benz 220 Cabriolet A (W187)

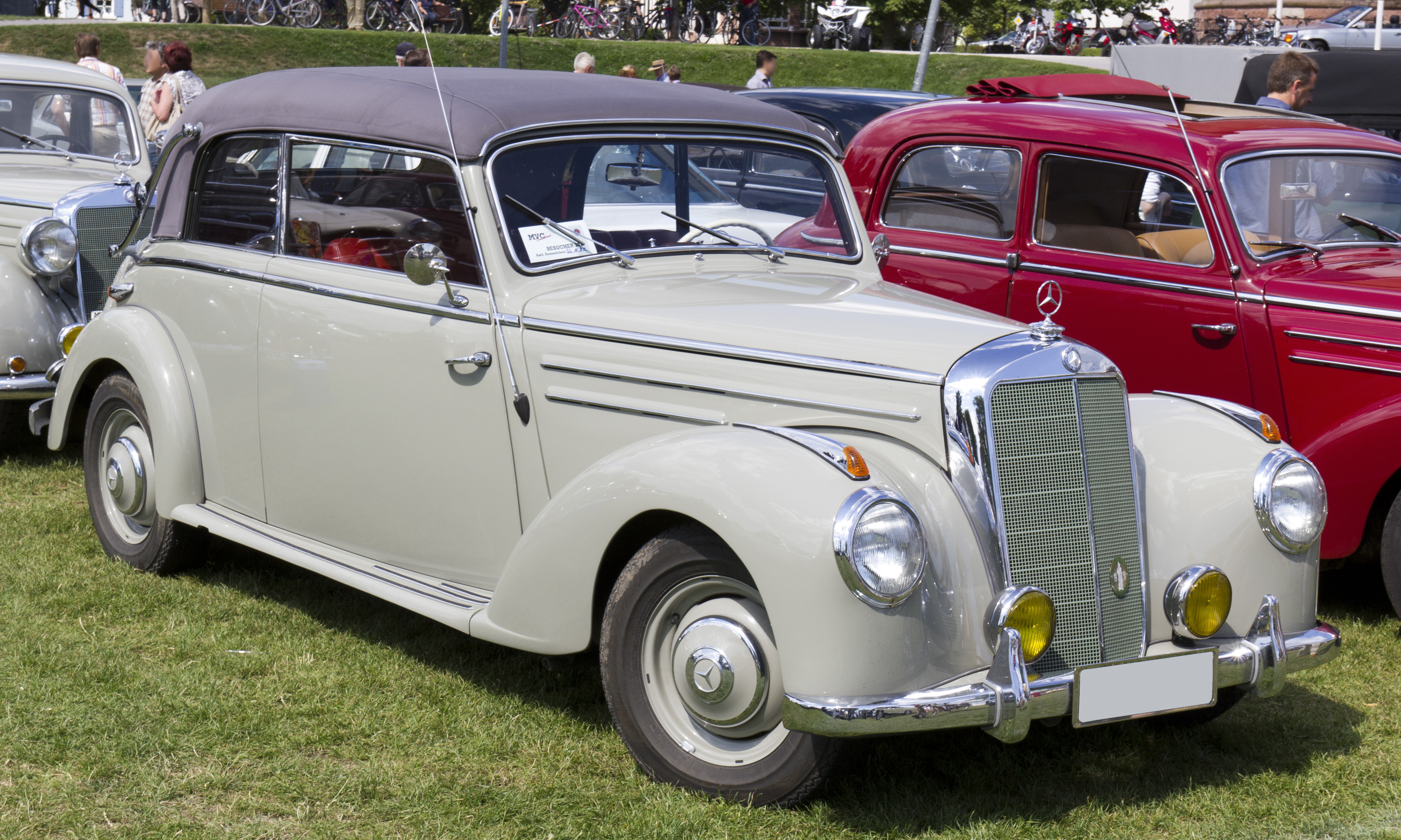
Mercedes-Benz 220 Cabriolet B (W187)

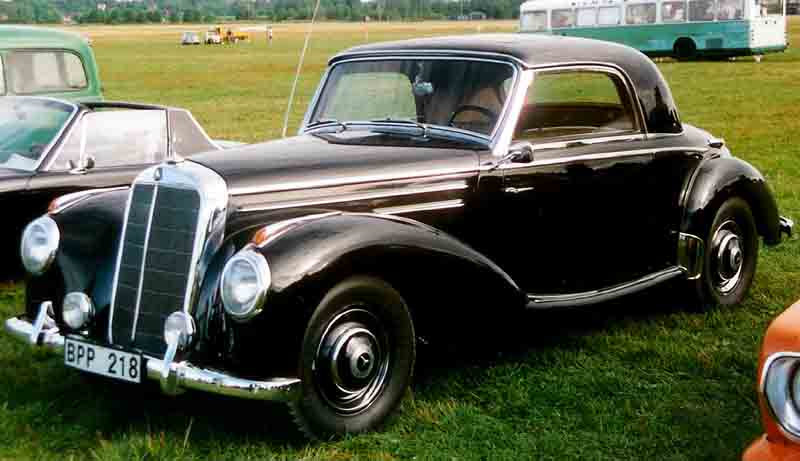
Mercedes-Benz 220 Coupé (W187)

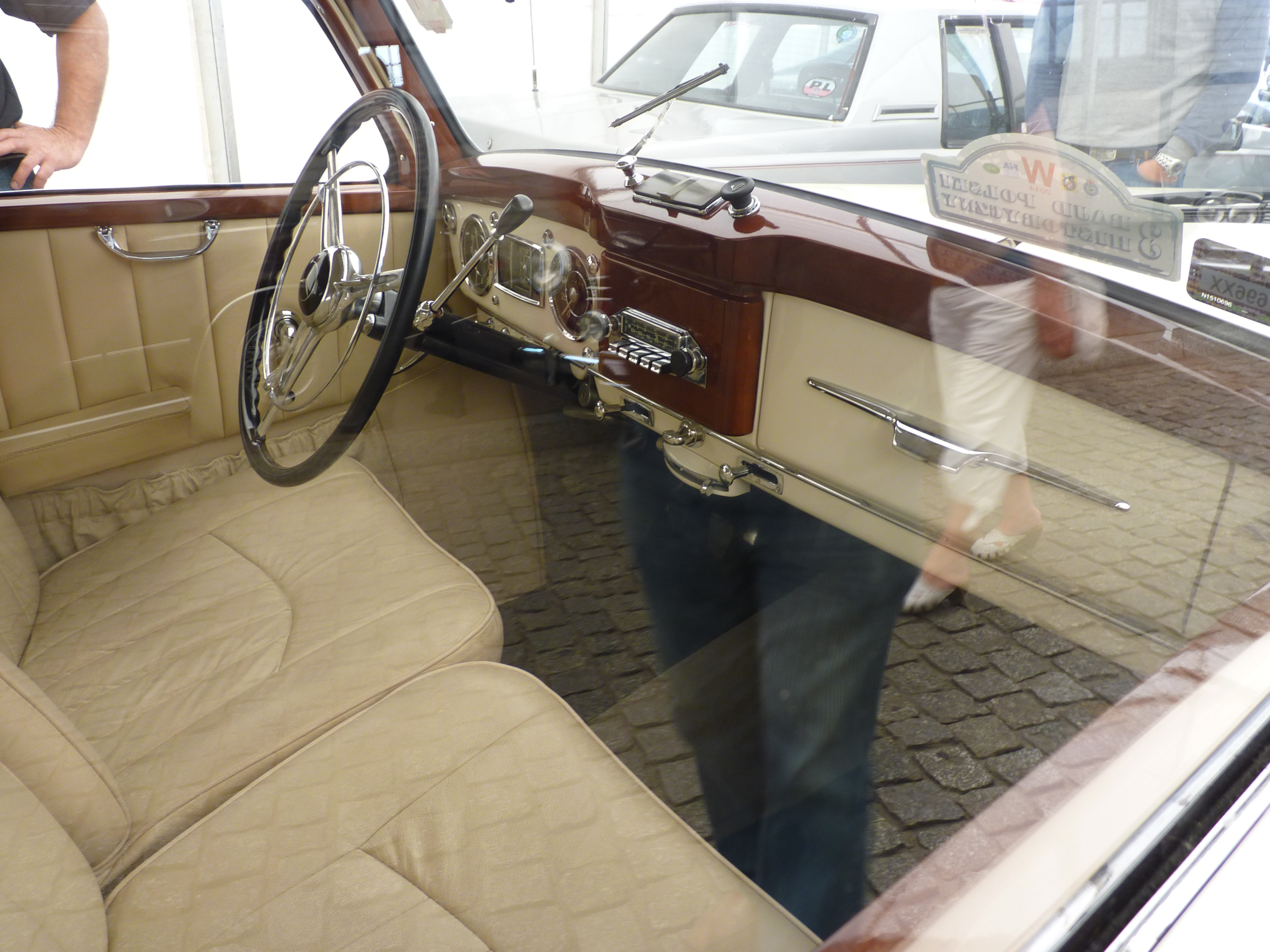
Mercedes-Benz 220 sedan interior (W187)

=== Specifications ===
Technical data Mercedes-Benz 220 (W187) (Manufacturer's figures except where stated)
| Mercedes-Benz | 220 | 220 Cabriolet/Coupé |
|---|---|---|
| Produced: | 1951–1954 | 1951–1955 |
| Engine: | 6-cylinder-inline engine (four-stroke), front-mounted | |
| Bore x Stroke: | 80 mm x 72.8 mm | |
| Displacement: | 2195 cc | |
| Max. Power @ rpm: | 80 PS (59 kW; 79 hp) @ 4850 | |
| Max. Torque @ rpm: | 142 N⋅m (105 lb⋅ft) @ 2500 | |
| Compression Ratio: | 6.5: 1 | |
| Fuel feed: | Two-barrel downdraft carburetter Solex 30PAAJ | |
| Fuel tank capacity: | 47 L (12.4 US gal; 10.3 imp gal), from late 1951 65 L (17.2 US gal; 14.3 imp gal) | |
| Valvetrain: | SOHC, duplex chain | |
| Cooling: | Water | |
| Gearbox: | 4-speed manual rear wheel drive, axle ratio 4.44:1 | |
| Electrical system: | 6 volt | |
| Front suspension: | Double wishbones, coil springs, stabilising bar | |
| Rear suspension:: | High-pivot swing axle, coil springs | High-pivot swing axle, coil springs |
| Brakes: | Drum brakes (Ø 240 mm) | |
| Steering: | Worm-and-sector steering | |
| Body structure: | Sheet steel on ovoid steel tube X-frame | Sheet steel with wood frame on ovoid steel tube X-frame |
| Dry weight: | 1,350 kg (2,980 lb) | 1,440 kg (3,170 lb) |
| Loaded weight: | 1,690 kg (3,730 lb) | Cabriolet A 1,680 kg (3,700 lb); Cabriolet B 1,785 kg (3,935 lb) |
| Track front/ rear: | 1,315 mm (51.8 in) 1,435 mm (56.5 in) | |
| Wheelbase: | 2,845 mm (112.0 in) | |
| Length: | 4,507 mm (177.4 in) | Cabriolet B: 4,507 mm (177.4 in); Cabriolet A: 4,538 mm (178.7 in) |
| Width: | 1,685 mm (66.3 in) | |
| Height: | 1,610 mm (63 in) | Cabriolet B: 1,610 mm (63 in); Cabriolet A: 1,560 mm (61 in) |
| Tyre/Tire sizes: | 6.40-15 - 185R15 | |
| Top speed: | 140 km/h (87 mph) | 140 km/h (87 mph); Cabriolet A: 145 km/h (90 mph) |
| Fuel Consumption (estimate): | 14.0 litres per 100 kilometres (20.2 mpg_{‑imp}; 16.8 mpg_{‑US}) | 14.5 litres per 100 kilometres (19.5 mpg_{‑imp}; 16.2 mpg_{‑US}) |
Price (Germany): Saloon Saloon w/fabric sunroof Cabriolet A Cabriolet B Coupé; Coupé w/steel sunroof: || align="center" | DM 11,925; DM 12,525 || align="center" | DM 18,860; DM 15,160; DM 20,850; DM 22,000

=== Timeline ===
| Chassis | Type | 1951 | 1952 | 1953 | 1954 | 1955 |
| W187 | saloon | 220 |
| W187 | coupe | | | | 220 |
| W187 | cabriolet | 220 |

== See also ==
- Mercedes-Benz 170S
