= Mercedes-Benz W128 =

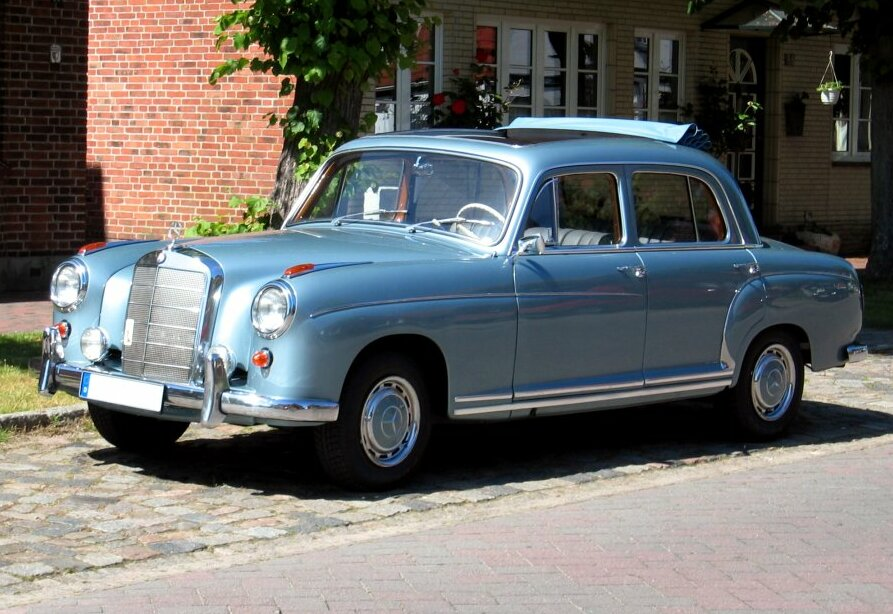
- Mercedes-Benz 220 SE Sedan

Overview
- Manufacturer: Mercedes-Benz
- Production: July 1958 – November 1960; 3,916 built
- Assembly: West Germany: Stuttgart; Australia: Port Melbourne (AMI)

Body and chassis
- Class: Luxury car (F)
- Body style: 4-door sedan 2-door coupe 2-door cabriolet
- Related: Mercedes-Benz W105 — 219; Mercedes-Benz W180 — 220a, 220S

Powertrain
- Engine: 2.2 L M127 I6
- Transmission: 4-speed manual

Dimensions
- Wheelbase: 2,820 mm (111.0 in) — sedan 2,700 mm (106.3 in) — coupé or cabriolet

Chronology
- Predecessor: Mercedes-Benz W180
- Successor: Mercedes-Benz W111

The Mercedes-Benz W128 is a 6-cylinder luxury car produced by Mercedes-Benz as the 220 SE from 1958 to 1960 as a sedan, coupé, and cabriolet. A more powerful version of the near-identical W180 220 S, it gained the fuel-injected M127 version of Mercedes' 2.2 L (134.3 cu in) M180 engine, and an 'E' in its name for Einspritzung, German for petrol injection. The 220 SE was the last new model of the "Ponton" range which had design and styling roots tracing to the 1953 W120 sedan it was derived from.

At the time, the cabriolet was priced at DM 23,400/$8,091, ten-percent above Cadillac's exclusive, high-end Eldorado Biarritz convertible. Nearly every interior surface of the coupé and cabriolet was covered in wood or leather, and matching leather luggage was available. However, power steering, windows, air conditioning, and an automatic transmission were not available (although an automatic clutch was offered with the column-mounted 4-speed manual transmission).

The W128 sedan was succeeded in 1959 by the W111 220 SEb "Fintail", and the W128 coupé and cabriolet in 1961 and 1962 by more subtly designed Paul Bracq-replacements, also designated the 220 SEb.

== Production ==
The W128 sedan was produced from October 1958 to August 1959 and the Coupé and Cabriolet from July 1958 to November 1960.

| Body | Units |
|---|---|
| Sedan | 1,974 |
| Coupé | 830 |
| Cabriolet | 1,112 |

== Gallery ==
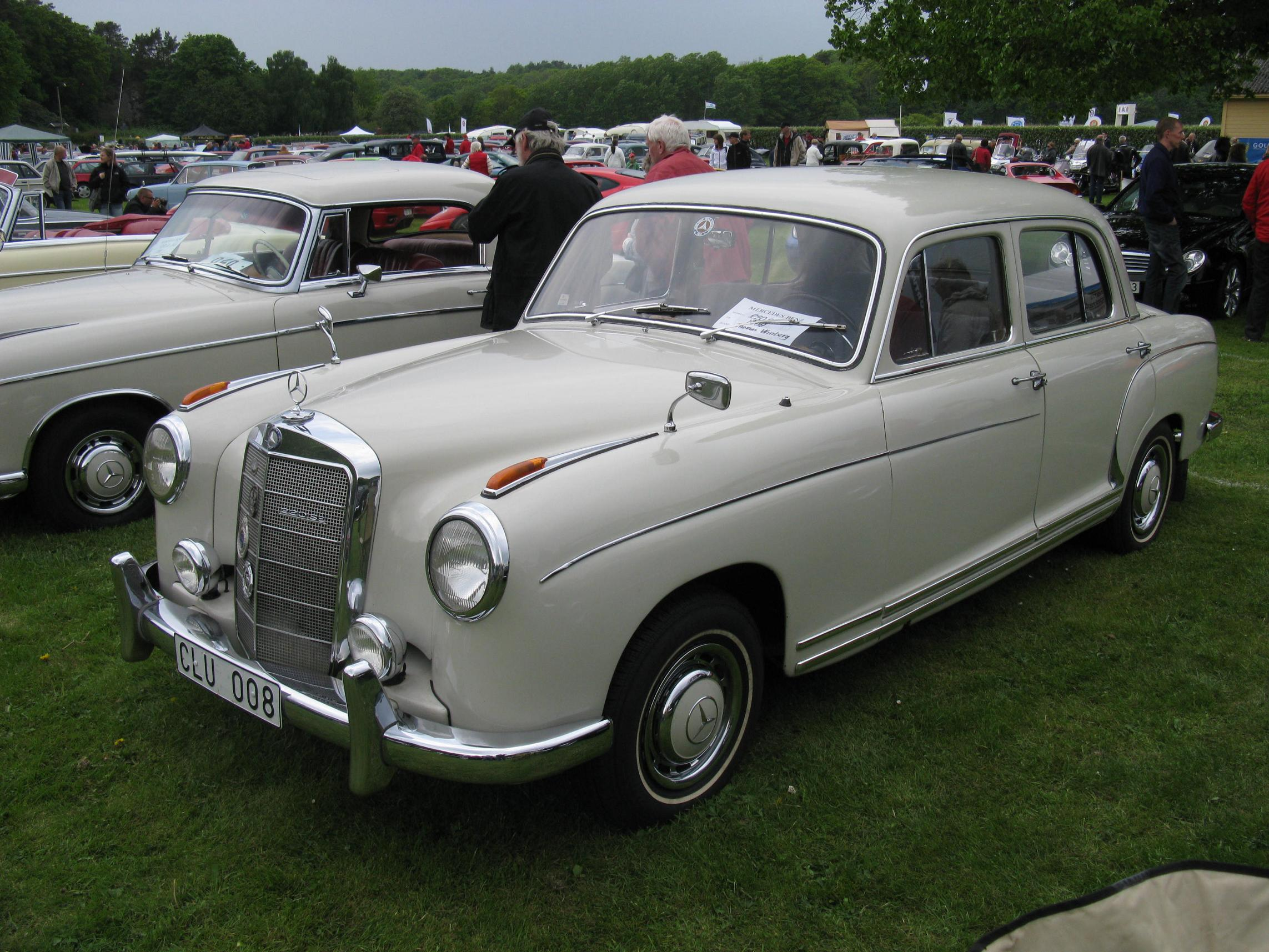
220SE Sedan

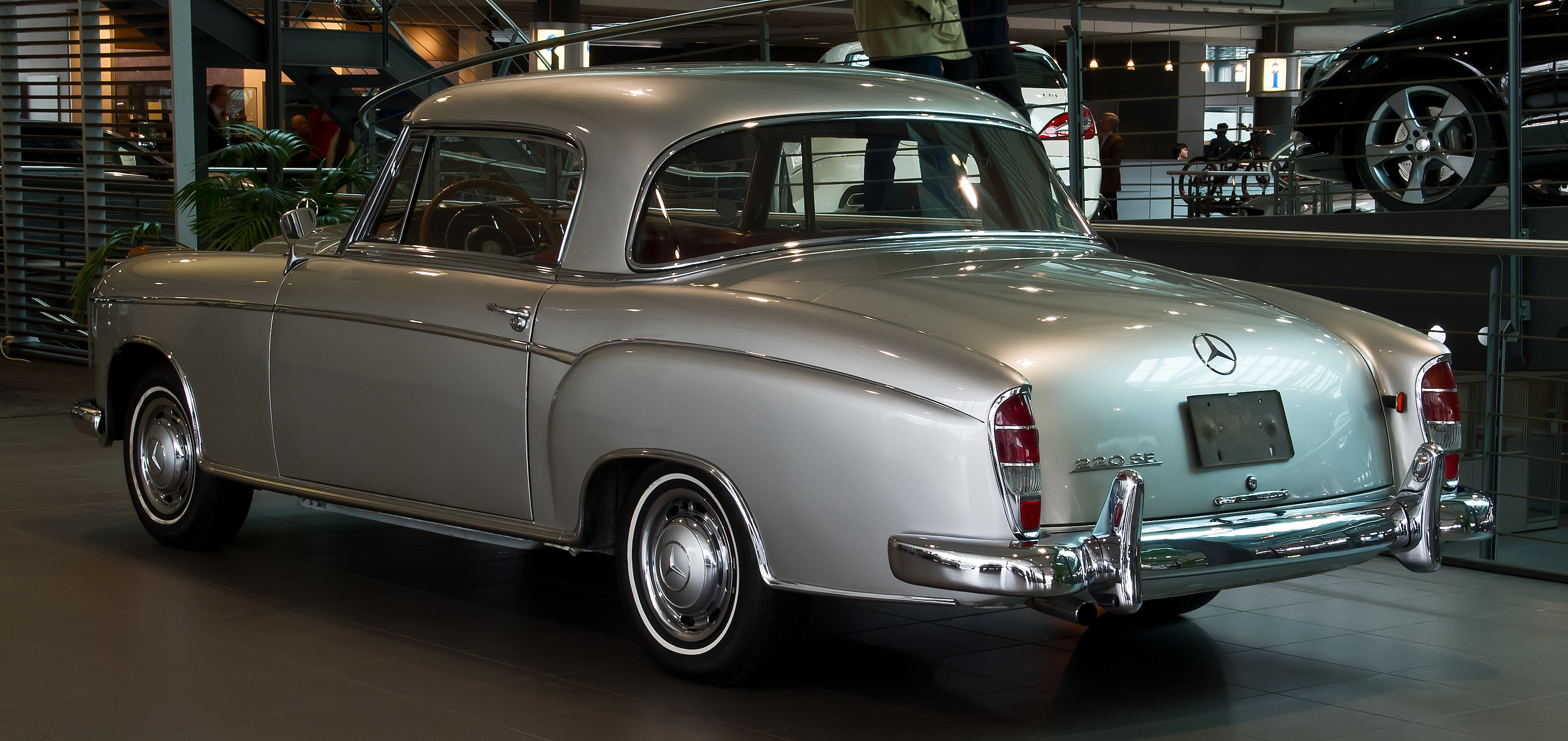
220SE Coupé

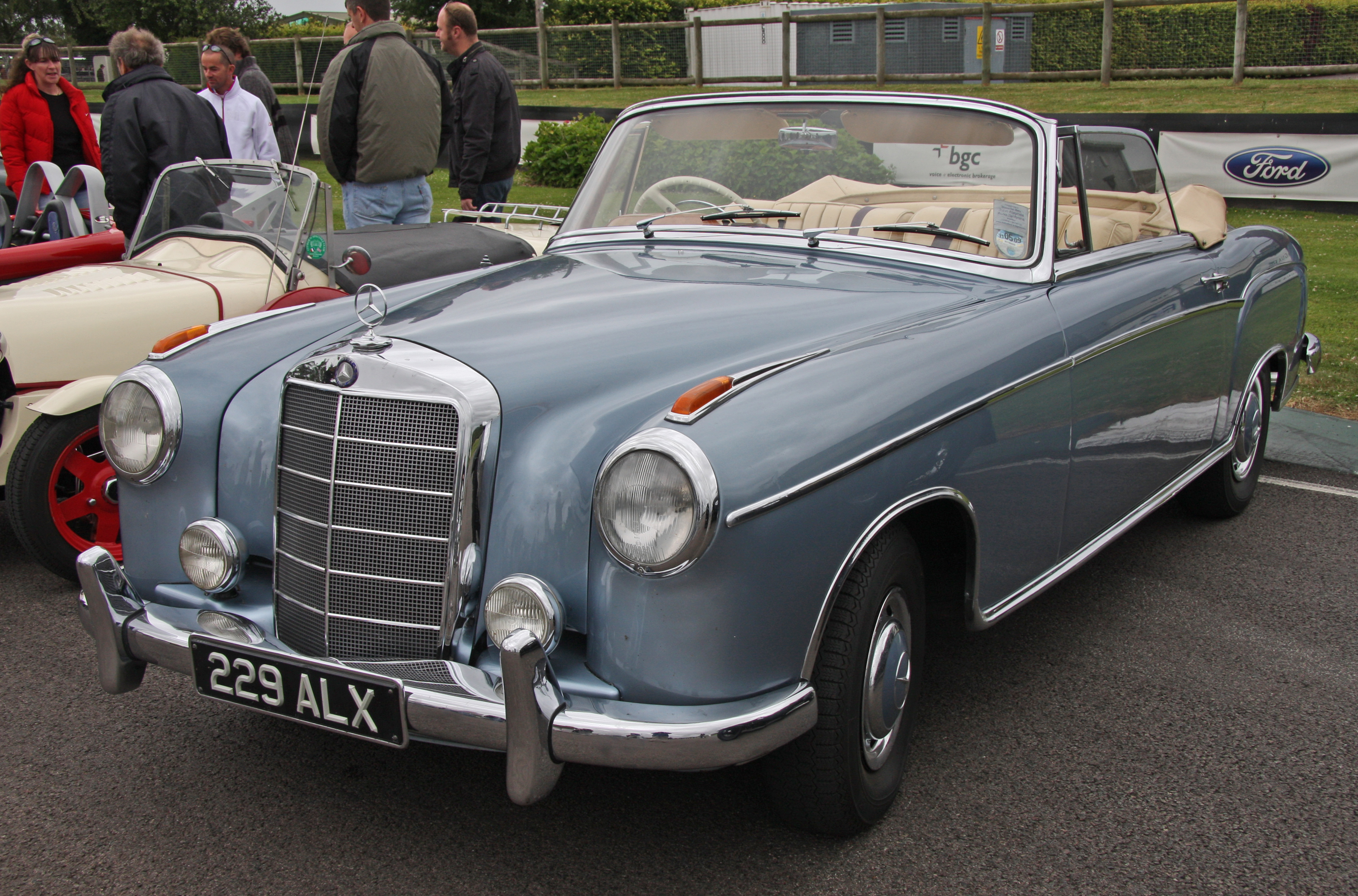
220SE Cabriolet

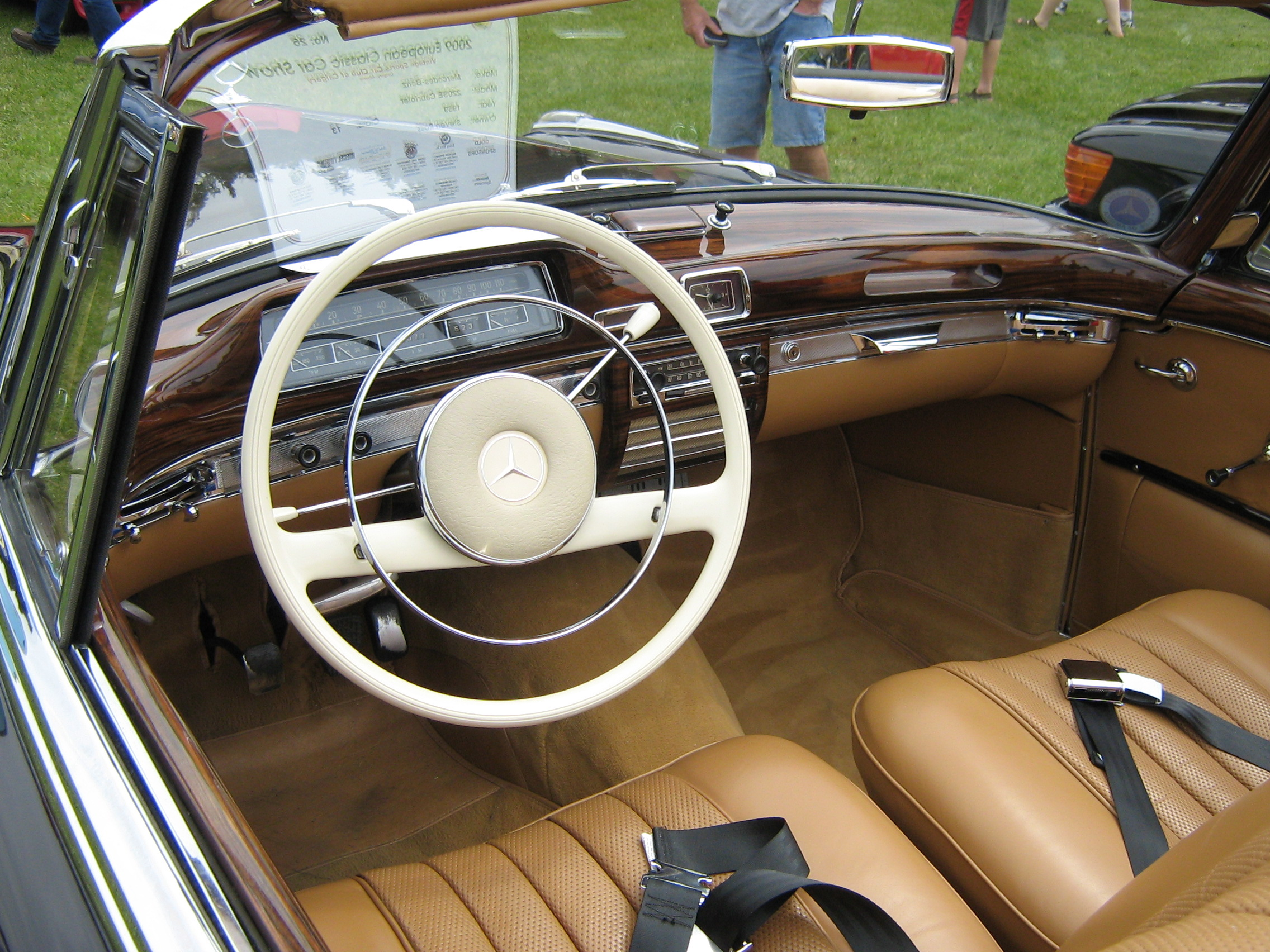
220SE Cabriolet interior
