= Mercedes-Benz W105 =

Mercedes-Benz W105 219
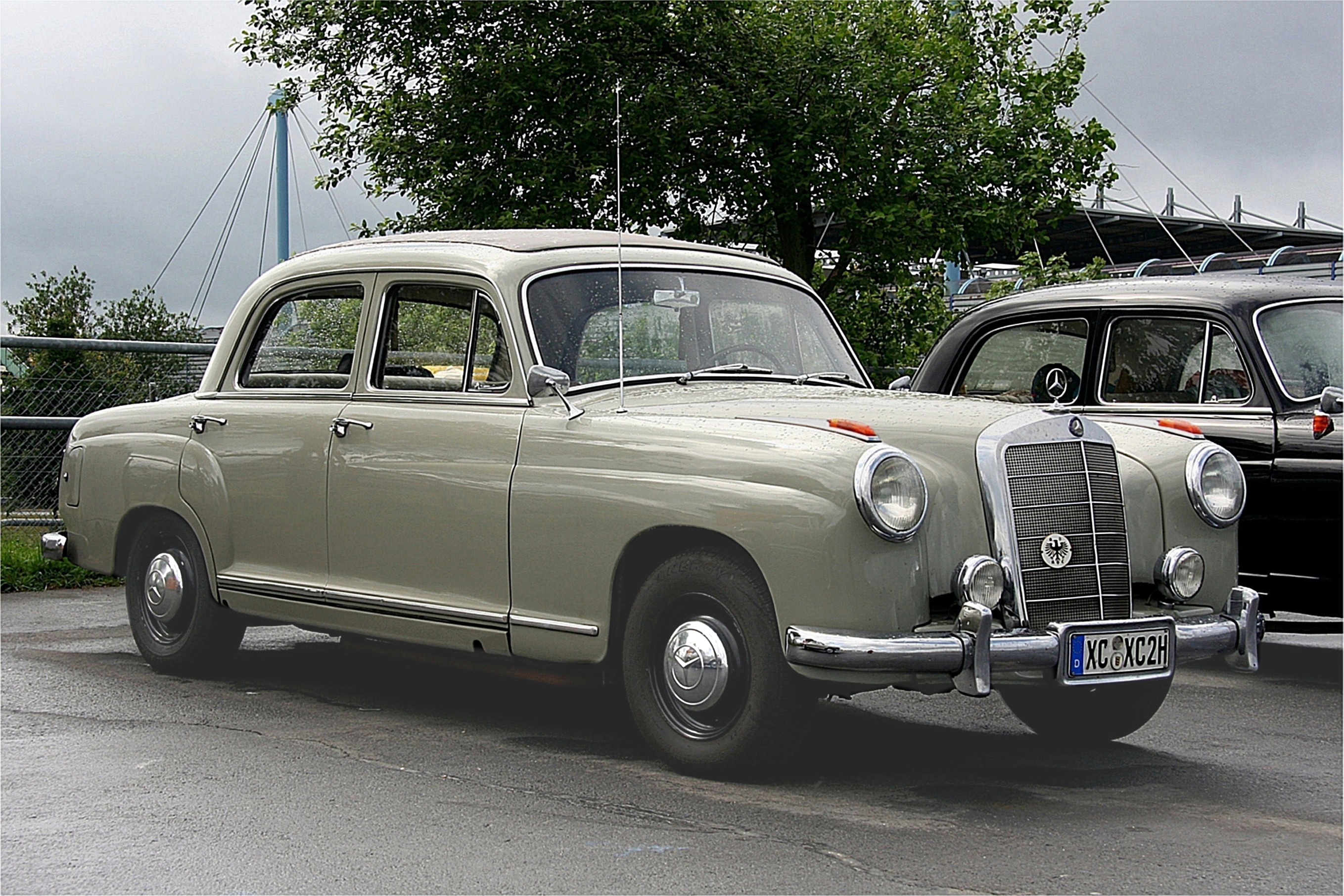
- Mercedes-Benz 219 (W105)

Overview
- Manufacturer: Daimler-Benz (saloons); IMA (estates)
- Production: 1956–1959; 27,845 built

Body and chassis
- Class: luxury car (F)
- Body style: 4-door saloon; 5-door estate
- Layout: Front-engine, rear-wheel-drive layout
- Related: Mercedes-Benz W120/W121 — 180 (D) & 190 (D); Mercedes-Benz W180 — 220a/S; Mercedes-Benz W128 — 220SE

Powertrain
- Engine: 2195 cc M180 II I6
- Transmission: 4-speed manual, lever on steering column

Dimensions
- Wheelbase: 2,750 mm (108.3 in)
- Length: 4,650 mm (183.1 in) from 8–1957: 468 cm (184 in)
- Width: 1,740 mm (68.5 in)
- Height: 1,560 mm (61.4 in)
- Curb weight: 1,290 kg (2,844 lb) (dry); 1,725 kg (3,803 lb) (loaded)

Chronology
- Predecessor: Mercedes-Benz W187
- Successor: Mercedes-Benz W111

The Mercedes-Benz W105 was a four-door executive car manufactured by Daimler-Benz from 1956 to 1959 and marketed as the Mercedes-Benz Typ(e) 219.

The ponton-styled Mercedes 219 was an effort by Daimler-Benz to offer an intermediate no-frills 6-cylinder model option. It combined the larger, more luxurious W128 220-series' 2.2 L (134 cu in) straight-six M180 engine and forward part of the 220's body shell with the more compact cabin of the entry-level 4-cylinder Mercedes-Benz W120 180/190.

The W128 had been derived from the W120, being stretched 100 mm in front to accommodate a 6-cylinder engine in place of a 4-cylinder, and adding 70 mm to the cabin's rear seat legroom, while leaving the trunk the same on both cars. The most obvious outward manifestation of the two model lines' mating is the shorter, single window rear doors.

== History ==
The W105's ponton body shape had been introduced in 1953 in the entry-level W120 180 sedan. In 1954 Mercedes-Benz debuted the 6-cylinder W180 220a luxury sedan, which was visually similar to the 180 but featured a 170 mm (7 in) longer wheelbase, and an entirely new rear suspension design. The additional length was divided, with 100 mm (4 in) added forward of the firewall to accommodate the larger M180 engine's two extra cylinders, and 70 mm (3 in) enlarging the second seat area to provide more legroom for rear passengers.

The 220a was the next Mercedes up in the maker's line ran until 1956, when the 219 was introduced, and the up-powered 220S version of the otherwise near identical 220a took its place.

== Model identification ==
The 219 from the a-pillar forward was identical to the long-nosed 220a, including the single-carburettor 2.2 L 6-cylinder engine. However, from the a‑pillar back, it used the shorter body of the W120/W121 180/190 models; both models shared the same boot. The result is a wheelbase and total length shorter than the 220 S but longer than the 190. The most obvious telltale of this combination is the one-piece windows of the 180-derived rear doors, which are smaller than the 220 series' and lack the larger car's vent windows.

Inside, the 219 used the simpler instrumentation of the smaller car, along with bakelite trim instead of wood.

Model	Years	Chassis code	Engine	Displacement	Power	Built
219	3/56–7/59	105.010; 105.011 (Note: Equipped with a Webasto sliding sunroof. The material was referred to as "Covertex" (vinyl).)	M 180.921 / R 6	2195 cc	86 PS (63 kW; 85 hp)	27,845

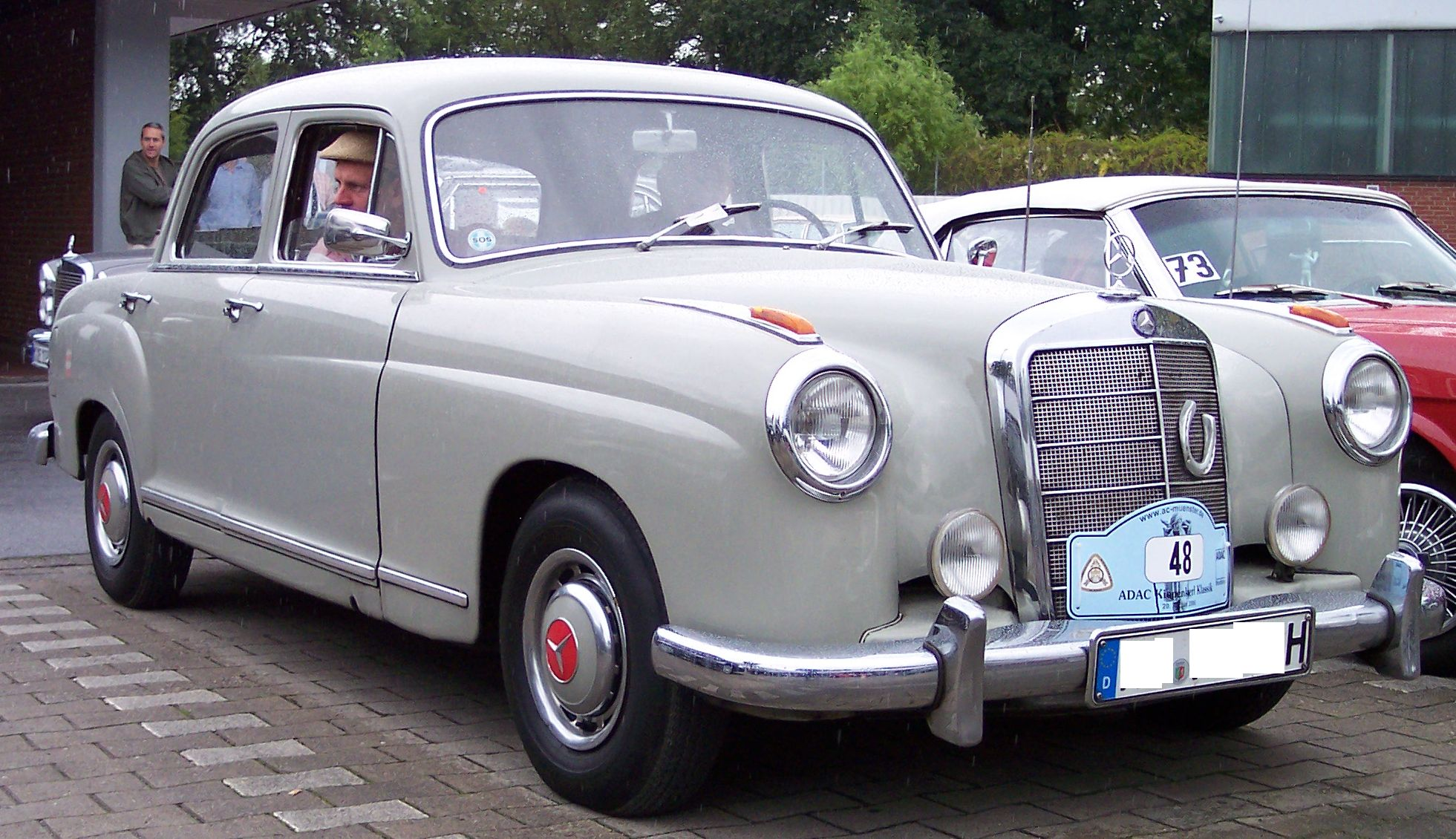
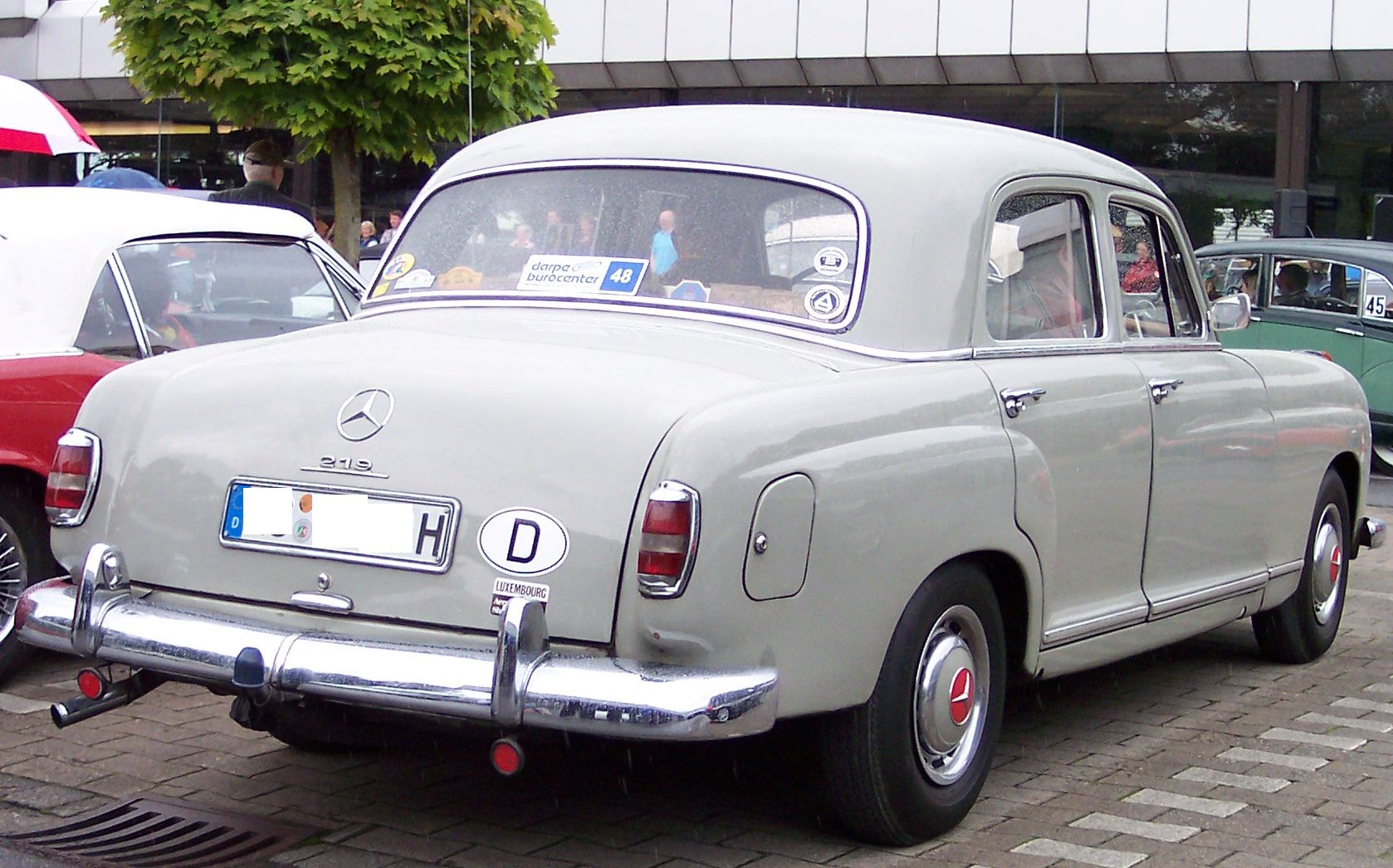
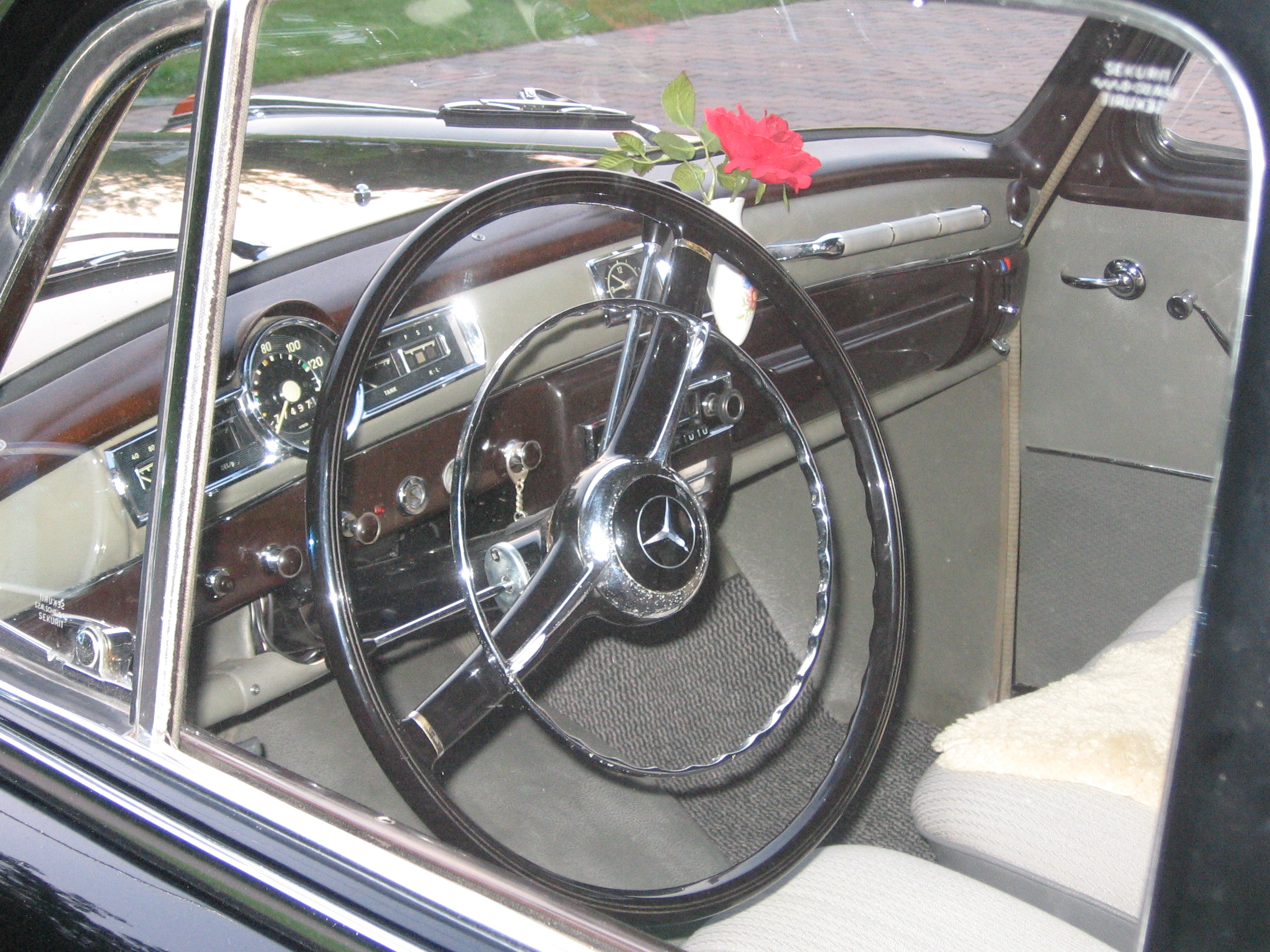
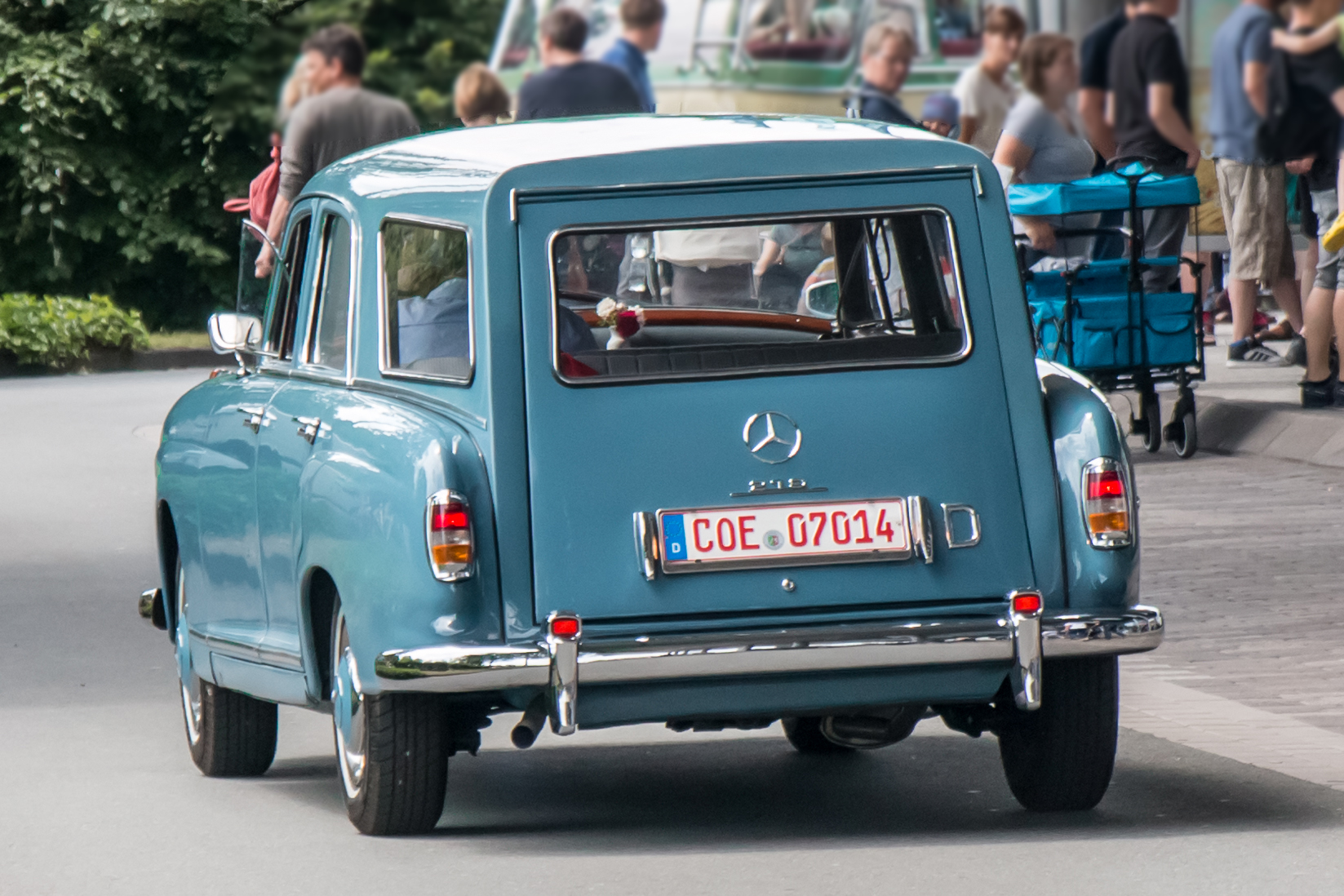
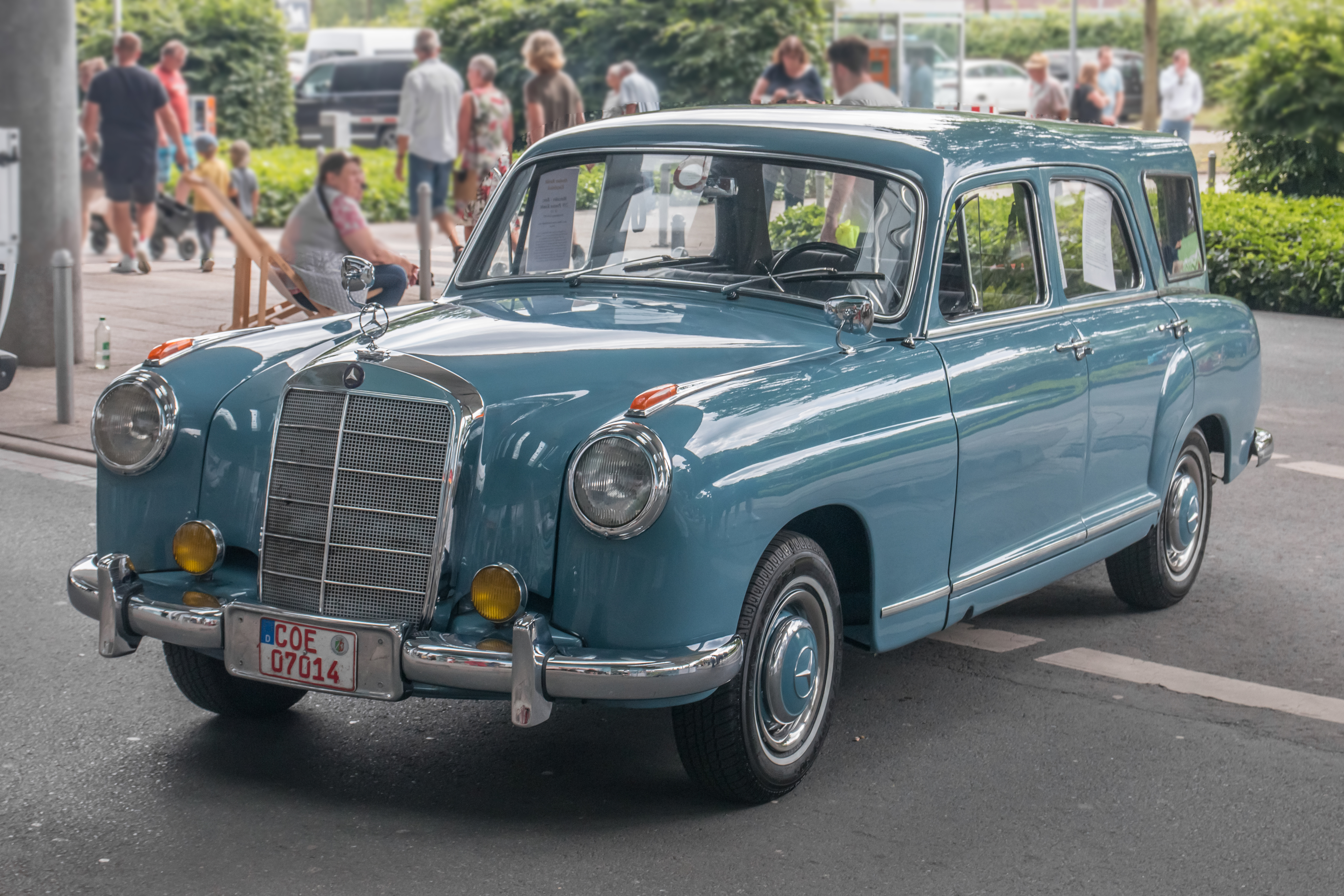

Technical data Mercedes-Benz W105 (Manufacturer's figures except where stated)
Mercedes-Benz	219
Engine	6-cylinder-inline engine (four-stroke), front-mounted
Bore x Stroke	80 mm x 72.8 mm
Displacement	2195 cc
Max. Power	86 PS (63 kW; 85 hp) @ 4800 rpm
Max. Torque	157 N⋅m (116 lbf⋅ft) @ 2400 rpm
Compression Ratio	7.6:1
Fuel feed:	Double downdraft carburetor Solex 32 PAATI
Fuel tank capacity	56 L (14.8 US gal; 12.3 imp gal)
Valvetrain	SOHC, duplex chain
Cooling	Water
Gearbox	4-speed manual, lever on steering column rear wheel drive, standard axle ratio 4.10:1 from August 1957: 3.90:1
Electrical system	12 volt
Front suspension	Double wishbones, coil springs, stabilising bar
Rear suspension	Swing axle, coil springs
Brakes	Drum brakes (Ø 230 mm), power assisted optional
Steering	Recirculating ball steering
Body structure	Sheet steel, unibody construction
Track front	1,430 mm (56 in)
Track rear	1,470 mm (58 in)
Tire sizes	6.40 x 13
Top speed	148 km/h (92 mph)
Fuel Consumption (estimate)	11.2 L/100 km (25 mpg_{‑imp}; 21.0 mpg_{‑US})
