= Mercedes-Benz M180 engine =

Mercedes-Benz M180
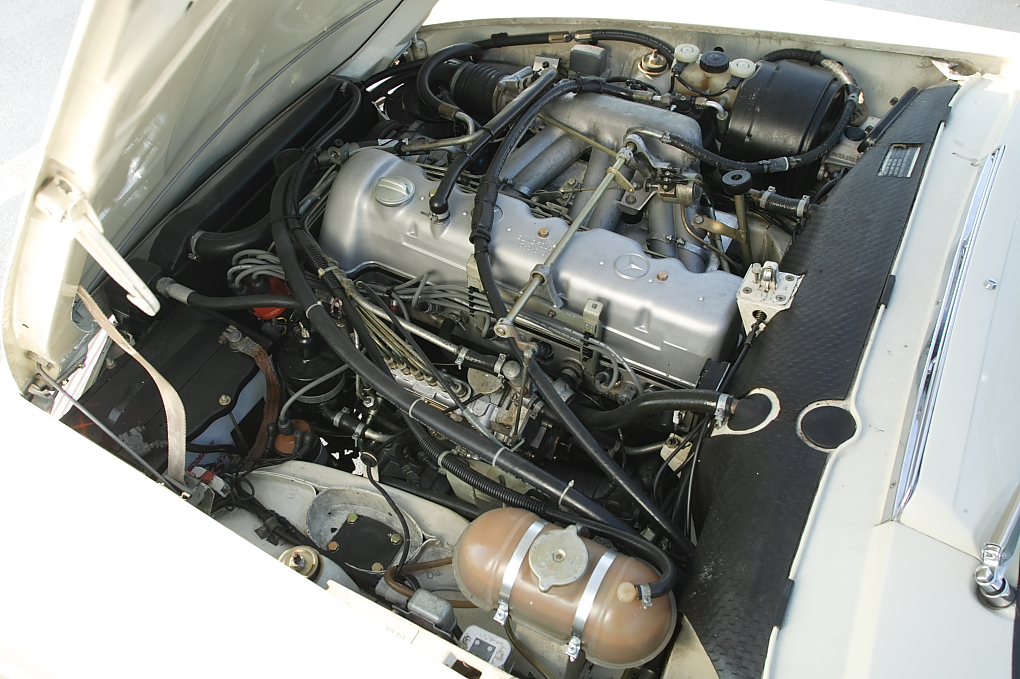
- M130 engine in a 1971 280SL

Overview
- Manufacturer: Daimler-Benz
- Designer: Wolf-Dieter Bensinger
- Production: 1951–1985

Layout
- Configuration: Inline-6
- Displacement: 2.2 L; 134.0 cu in (2,196 cc); 2.3 L; 140.8 cu in (2,307 cc); 2.3 L; 139.9 cu in (2,292 cc); 2.5 L; 152.3 cu in (2,496 cc); 2.5 L; 154.1 cu in (2,525 cc); 2.8 L; 169.5 cu in (2,778 cc)
- Cylinder bore: 80 mm (3.15 in); 82 mm (3.23 in); 86 mm (3.39 in); 86.5 mm (3.41 in)
- Piston stroke: 72.4 mm (2.85 in); 72.8 mm (2.87 in); 78.8 mm (3.10 in)
- Valvetrain: SOHC 2 valves per cylinder

Combustion
- Fuel system: Solex or Zenith carburettors Bosch mechanical or D-Jetronic fuel injection
- Fuel type: Petrol
- Cooling system: Water-cooled

Output
- Power output: 80–134 bhp (60–100 kW; 81–136 PS)

Chronology
- Predecessor: Mercedes-Benz M153 engine (pre-war); Mercedes-Benz M189 engine (for M130)
- Successor: Mercedes-Benz M110 engine (for M130); Mercedes-Benz M103 engine (for M123)

The Mercedes-Benz M180 (along with the related M127, M108, M129, M130, M114, and M123) is a family of single overhead camshaft inline-6 internal combustion engines used in Mercedes-Benz vehicles from the early 1950s to the mid‑1980s. Featuring a reverse-flow cylinder head, staggered valve arrangement, and rockers actuated by a single overhead camshaft driven by a duplex chain, these engines were produced in both carburetted and fuel‑injected versions with displacements ranging from 2.2 to 2.8 litres.

The original design by Wolf-Dieter Bensinger is a 2.2 L (2,196 cc; 134.0 cu in) single overhead camshaft inline-six internal combustion engine introduced at the Frankfurt Motor Show in April 1951 to power the company's new 220 (W187).

Although introduced in parallel with the M186 “big six,” that engine family (M188, M189, M194, M198, M199) is of completely different design with little or no part interchangeability. The M180, however, influenced the design of Mercedes‑Benz’s OHC four‑cylinder engine, the M121 in 1955, sharing not only the architecture but many components. It in turn influenced its diesel sibling, the OM621, in 1958. These evolved into the M115 and OM615 engines in 1968. The diesel range later expanded into the larger‑displacement OM616 in 1973 and the five‑cylinder OM617 in 1974.

== 2.2‑litre (M180 and M127) ==
=== M180.920 ===
In its original form, the first‑generation M180 I (180.920) had an oversquare 80 mm × 72.8 mm (3.15 in × 2.87 in) bore and stroke, giving a 2196‑cc displacement. Fed by twin downdraught Solex 30 PAAJ carburettors and with a 6.5:1 compression ratio, it produced 80 PS (59 kW; 79 hp) at 4600 rpm and 14.5 kg⋅m (142 N⋅m; 105 lb⋅ft) at 2500 rpm, with piston speeds of 11.1 m/s (maximum) and 6.1 m/s (mean).

The engine was paired with the chassis of the Mercedes-Benz 170S to create the new W187 220 model.

- 220 W187.011 sedan (04/07.1951 – 05.1954)
- 220 W187.012 Cabriolet A (04/08.1951 – 04.1954)
- 220 W187.013 Cabriolet B (04/07.1951 – 05.1953)
- 220 W187.023 coupé (12.1953 – 04.1954)

=== M180.921 ===
In June 1954 the new W180 Ponton was introduced, and the engine was adapted for this car. The M180 II (180.921) had a higher compression ratio (7.6:1) and upgraded carburettors (Solex 32 PAATJ). The W180 initially appeared only as a sedan , so production of the two‑door W187 continued and also received the new engine. After the engine was upgraded to the third‑generation .924 (see below), the older motor powered the new hybrid W105 “219”, which debuted simultaneously.

It produced 85 PS (63 kW; 84 hp) at 4800 rpm and 16 kg⋅m (157 N⋅m; 116 lb⋅ft) at 2400 rpm (piston speeds 11.6 m/s max, 5.8 m/s mean).

- 220a W180.010 sedan (03/06.1954 – 04.1956)
- 220 W187.023 coupé (04.1954 – 07.1955)
- 220 W187.012 Cabriolet A (04.1954 – 08.1955)
- 219 W105.010 sedan (03.1956 – 08.1957)

In August 1957 the compression ratio was raised to 8.7:1. Output increased to 90 PS (66 kW; 89 hp) at 4800 rpm and 17 kg⋅m (167 N⋅m; 123 lb⋅ft) at 2400 rpm (piston speeds 11.6 m/s max, 5.8 m/s mean).

- 219 W105.010 sedan (08.1957 – 07.1959)

=== M180.924 ===
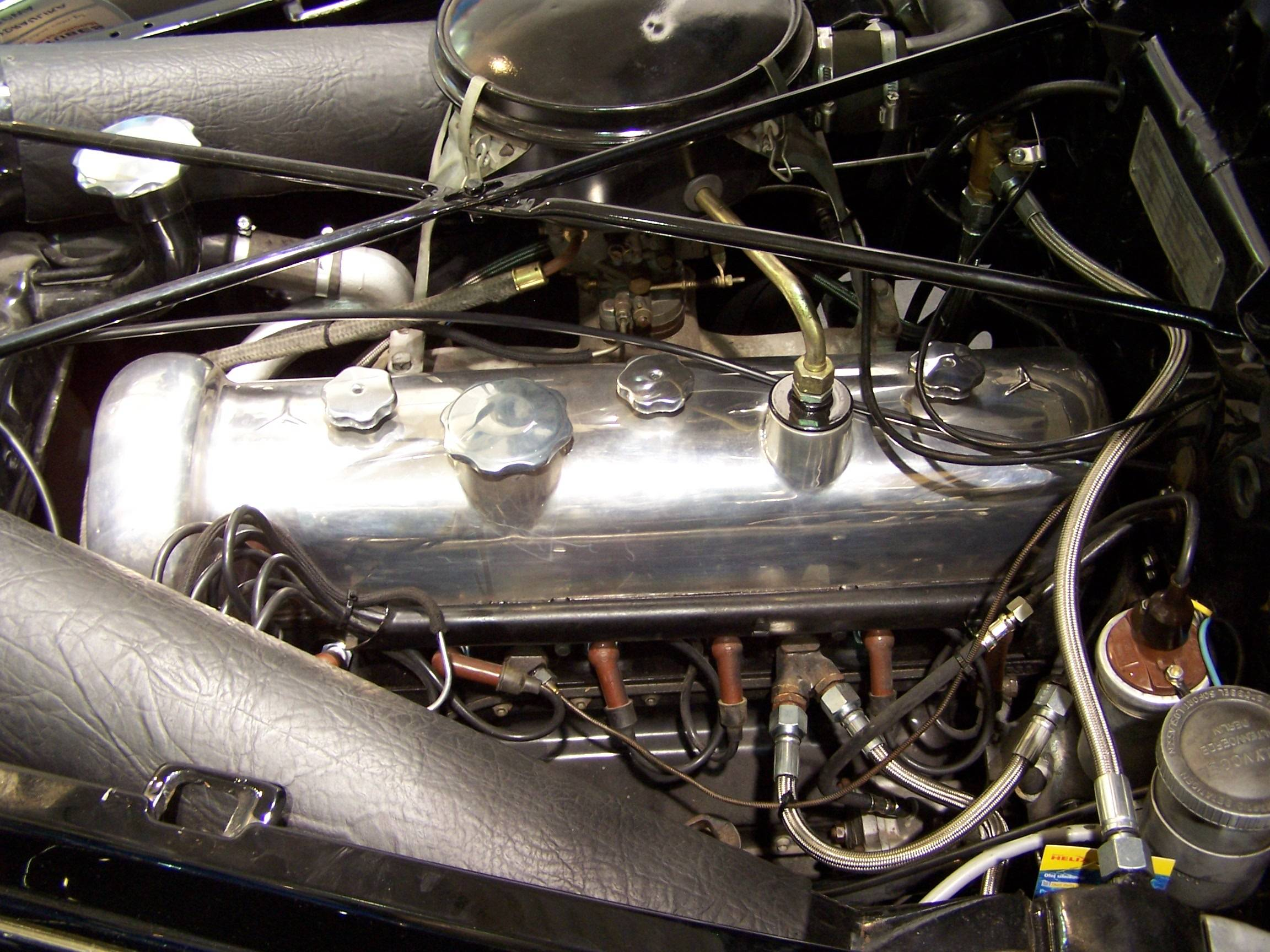
A second‑generation M180 in a W187 220 Cabriolet A

In March 1956 the 220a (W180) model was split: the hybrid W105 219 retained the second‑generation .921 engine (see above), while the W180 was rebadged as the 220S and received the third‑generation engine. The M180 III (180.924) kept the 7.6:1 compression ratio but was fed by a pair of compound Solex 32 PAJTA carburettors.

It produced 100 PS (74 kW; 99 hp) at 4800 rpm and 16.5 kg⋅m (162 N⋅m; 119 lb⋅ft) at 3500 rpm (piston speeds 11.6 m/s max, 8.5 m/s mean).

- 220S W180.010 sedan (03.1956 – 08.1957)
- 220S W180.037 coupé (10.1956 – 08.1957)
- 220S W180.030 cabriolet (07.1956 – 08.1957)

In August 1957 compression was raised to 8.7:1. The engine then produced 106 PS (78 kW; 105 hp) at 5200 rpm and 17.5 kg⋅m (172 N⋅m; 127 lb⋅ft) at 3500 rpm (piston speeds 12.6 m/s max, 8.5 m/s mean).

- 220S W180.010 sedan (08.1957 – 08.1959)
- 220S W180.037 coupé (08.1957 – 10.1959)
- 220S W180.030 cabriolet (08.1957 – 10.1959)

=== M127.980 ===
In October 1958 Bosch Mechanical fuel injection, previously limited to the exclusive W188 300S and W198 300SL, became available for the 220 series. The cars received a new chassis and model code: W128 220SE, and the engine—retaining the cylinder block—was designated the M127 I (127.980).

Fuel was delivered by a mechanically controlled multi‑point injection system operating on an intermittent group injection scheme, with two pistons controlling a group of three cylinders each. The injection pump was mechanically driven and controlled EP/ZEA 2KL 75 unit, with an injection pressure of 15 atü (about 1570 kPa), equivalent to a BMEP of 11.1 kp/cm^{2} (1.09 MPa). Daimler‑Benz achieved this BMEP by using, in addition to manifold injection, resonance‑effect induction, giving the engine a volumetric efficiency greater than 100 per cent.

It produced 115 PS (85 kW; 113 hp) at 4800 rpm and 19.0 kg⋅m (186 N⋅m; 137 lb⋅ft) at 3800 rpm (piston speeds 11.6 m/s max, 9.2 m/s mean).

- 220SE W128.010 sedan (04/10.1958 – 08.1959)
- 220SE W128.030 cabriolet (07/10.1958 – 08.1959)
- 220SE W128.037 coupé (07/10.1958 – 08.1959)

=== M180.940 ===
In August 1959 the new W111 “Fintail” succeeded the W180 Ponton. Initially only sedans were produced. The M180 and M127 engines received performance updates.

For the W111 220b, which replaced the W105 219, the M180 IV (180.940) was fed by twin Solex 34 PJCB carburettors. It produced 95 PS (70 kW; 94 hp) at 4800 rpm and 17.2 kg⋅m (169 N⋅m; 124 lb⋅ft) at 3200 rpm (piston speeds 11.6 m/s max, 7.8 m/s mean).

- 220b W111.010 sedan (05./08.1959 – 08.1965)

=== M180.941 ===
For the 220Sb, replacing the Ponton model of the same name, the M180 V (180.941) initially used the enlarged compound Solex 34 PAJTA pair, but in July 1963 these were replaced with Zenith 35/40 INAT carburettors with an automatic choke.

It produced 110 PS (81 kW; 108 hp) at 5000 rpm and 17.5 kg⋅m (172 N⋅m; 127 lb⋅ft) at 3500 rpm (piston speeds 12.1 m/s max, 8.5 m/s mean).

- 220Sb W111.012 sedan (05/08.1959 – 07.1965)

=== M127.982 ===
For the 220SEb (the lower‑case “b” distinguishing it from the Ponton sedan it replaced), the M127 III (127.982) was updated. The two‑door W128 models still in production also received the new engine.

It produced 120 PS (88 kW; 118 hp) at 4800 rpm and 19.3 kg⋅m (189 N⋅m; 140 lb⋅ft) at 3900 rpm (piston speeds 11.6 m/s max, 9.5 m/s mean).

- 220SEb W111.014 sedan (08.1959 – 08.1965)
- 220SE W128.030 cabriolet (08.1959 – 11.1960)
- 220SE W128.037 coupé (08.1959 – 11.1960)

=== M127.984 ===
In its final iteration, the M127 V (127.984) powered the two‑door W111 220SEb models upon their introduction in early 1961. Output was the same as for the third generation of the M127. Both the .982 and .987 would get the updated Bosch EP/ZEB 2KL 75 pump in January 1962, which improved idling control.

- 220SEb W111.023 cabriolet (09.1961 – 10.1965)
- 220SEb W111.021 coupé (09.1960 / 02.1961 – 10.1965)

== 2.3‑litre (M127 and M180) ==
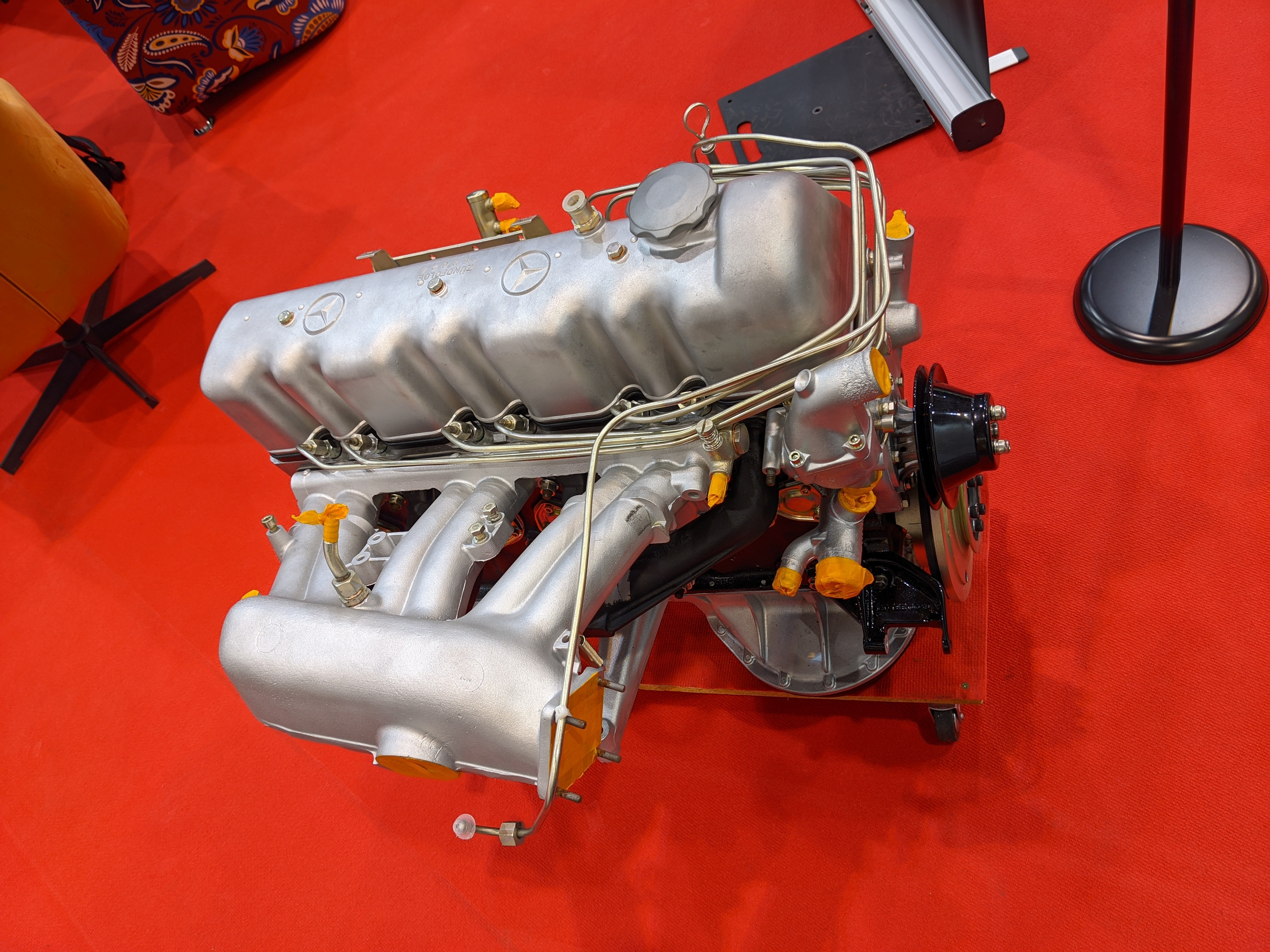
An M127 engine from a W113 230SL “Pagoda”

=== M127.981 ===
In summer 1963 the new‑generation W113 “Pagoda” roadster debuted. Among its novel features was a notably powerful engine. Power came from a 9.3:1 compression ratio, a Bosch PES SK 6L 70/120 R18 six‑plunger fuel‑injection pump, and a 2‑mm larger bore—82 mm × 72.8 mm (3.23 in × 2.87 in)—increasing displacement to 2.3 L (2,306 cc; 140.7 cu in). The M127 II’s 127.981 code indicates that development began in 1958.

It produced 150 PS (110 kW; 148 hp) at 5500 rpm and 20.0 kg⋅m (196 N⋅m; 145 lb⋅ft) at 4200 rpm (piston speeds 13.3 m/s max, 10.2 m/s mean).

- 230SL W113.042 roadster (03/07.1963 – 01.1967)

=== M180.947 ===
In July 1965, after the introduction of the 250‑series W108, the W111 remained in production as the flagship of the Fintail sedans, now called the 230S. It was powered by the M180 VIII (180.947), which used the Pagoda’s block but the 220Sb’s cylinder head, milled to give a 9.0:1 compression ratio.

It produced 120 PS (88 kW; 118 hp) at 5400 rpm and 18.2 kg⋅m (178 N⋅m; 132 lb⋅ft) at 4000 rpm (piston speeds 13.1 m/s max, 9.7 m/s mean).

- 230S W111.010 sedan (07.1965 – 01.1968)

=== M180.945 ===
The lower‑priced W110 Fintail succeeded the departed 220 W111 as the 230, creating a hybrid model with a lower‑cost body and a six‑cylinder engine (similar to the W105 219). The M180 IX (180.945) had a 9.0:1 compression ratio and was fed by a pair of Solex 38 PDSI‑2 carburettors.

It produced 105 PS (77 kW; 104 hp) at 5200 rpm and 17.7 kg⋅m (174 N⋅m; 128 lb⋅ft) at 3600 rpm (piston speeds 12.6 m/s max, 8.7 m/s mean).

- 230 W110.011 sedan (07.1965 – 07.1966)

=== M180.949 ===
In July 1966 Mercedes‑Benz gave the W110 230 the same power package as the W111 230S. The M180 X (180.949) now used the compound Zenith 35/40 INAT carburettor pair.

It produced 120 PS (88 kW; 118 hp) at 5400 rpm and 18.2 kg⋅m (178 N⋅m; 132 lb⋅ft) at 4000 rpm (piston speeds 13.1 m/s max, 9.7 m/s mean).

- 230 W110.011 sedan (07.1966 – 01.1968)

=== M180.954 ===
With the launch of the new “/8” cars in 1968, most models received redesigned engines (the M114 and its four‑cylinder counterpart, the M115). The exception was the W114 230, which kept the older motor, the M180 V 23 (180.954). For improved reliability and cooling, the bore was reduced by 0.25 mm, decreasing displacement to 2.3 L (2,292 cc; 139.9 cu in), while the Zenith 35/40 INAT pair retained the automatic choke. Production continued past the 1973 facelift and ended in autumn 1976, concluding the 25‑year story of the original M180.

It produced 120 PS (88 kW; 118 hp) at 5400 rpm and 18.2 kg⋅m (178 N⋅m; 132 lb⋅ft) at 3600 rpm (piston speeds 13.1 m/s max, 8.7 m/s mean).

- 230/8 W114.015 sedan (09.1967 / 01.1968 – 08.1973)
- 230/8 W114.017 long‑wheelbase sedan (08.1968 – 07.1973)
- 230.6 W114.615 sedan (09.1973 – 11.1976)
- 230.6 W114.617 long‑wheelbase sedan (08.1973 – 10.1976)

== 2.5‑litre (M108 and M129) ==
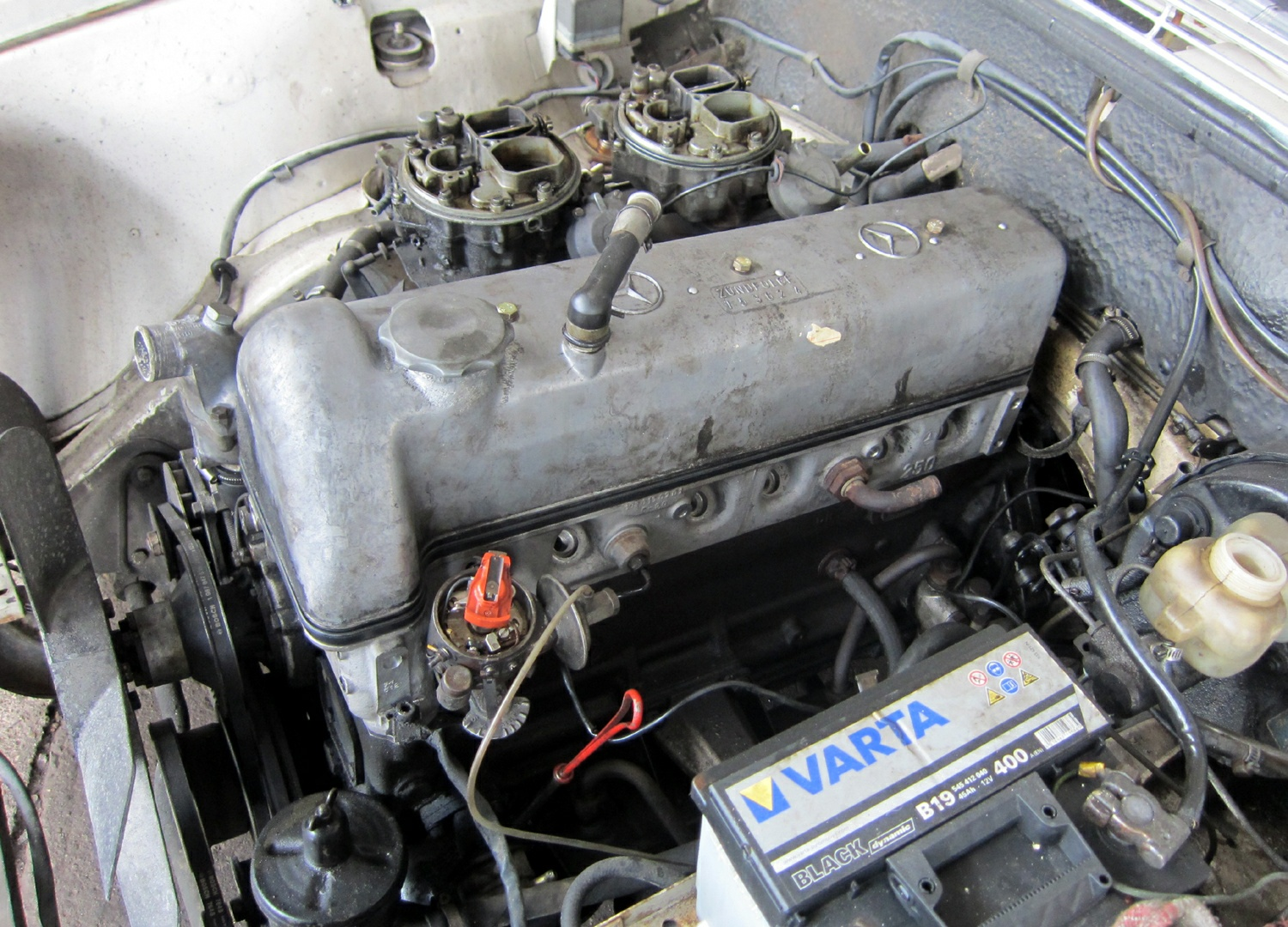
M108 in a W108 250S

=== M108.920 ===
The introduction of the W108 in September 1965 created a new 250 series. This was achieved by stroking the 2.3‑litre M180 by 6 mm to 82 mm × 78.8 mm (3.23 in × 3.10 in), increasing displacement to 2.5 L (2,496 cc; 152.3 cu in). A change from four to seven main bearings was necessary to handle the increased power smoothly. A larger‑capacity oil pump was also fitted, and the cylinder heads had larger ports and valves enlarged by 2 mm.

The M108 I (108.920) was the entry model, retaining the twin two‑barrel Zenith 35/40 INAT carburettors and 9.0:1 compression ratio of the later M180 (.941). It produced 130 hp (96 kW) at 5400 rpm and 19.8 kg·m (194 N·m) at 4000 rpm (piston speeds 14.1 m/s max, 10.5 m/s mean).

- 250S W108.012 sedan (07/09.1965 – 03.1969)

=== M129.980 ===
The fuel‑injected version received the new code M129 I (129.980). A mechanically controlled six‑piston Bosch PES SK 6L 70/120 R20 six‑plunger injection pump with start and stop solenoids supplied fuel to the injectors. The injectors were repositioned for a more direct angle toward the inlet valves. The engine‑cooling fan gained six blades instead of four and incorporated a viscous coupling that engaged only when engine speed exceeded 3,000 rpm or the coolant reached a preset temperature. Initially compression was 9.3:1, but in September 1966 it was raised to 9.5:1.

It produced 150 hp (110 kW) at 5500 rpm and 22.0 kg·m (216 N·m) at 4200 rpm (piston speeds 14.4 m/s max, 11.0 m/s mean).

- 250SE W108.014 sedan (08/09.1965 – 01.1968)
- 250SE W111.023 cabriolet (08/09.1965 – 12.1967)
- 250SE W111.021 coupé (08/09.1965 – 12.1967)

=== M129.982 ===
The M129 III (129.982) powered the W113 Pagoda 250SL, with performance identical to the .980 version.

- 250SL W113.043 roadster (11/12.1966 – 01.1968)

The M129 engine proved controversial and short‑lived. Although the crankshaft had seven bearings, the cylinders were still asymmetrically spaced in pairs, causing uneven cooling between each pair. This was not a problem in the 2.3‑litre M127, but the stroked motor’s peak piston speed rose to 14.4 m/s (versus 13.1 m/s for the 2.3), creating excessive stress and leading to premature failures. To address this, Mercedes‑Benz redesigned the cylinder block with symmetrical cylinder bores, resulting in two new engines: the M114 for the 2.5‑litre displacement and a bored‑out M130 (see below).

== 2.5‑litre (M114) ==
=== M114.920 ===
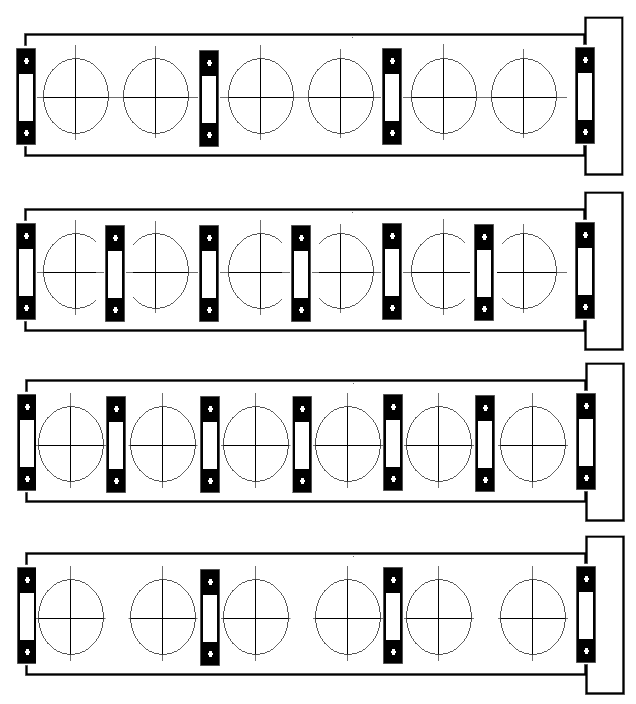
Simplified diagram comparing cylinder‑bore symmetry and crankshaft pins. Top: original M180 and M127 asymmetrical four‑pin layout. Middle: M108 and M129 asymmetrical seven‑pin layout. Lower: final symmetrical seven‑pin layout used on the M114, M130, and later M110. Bottom: unique symmetrical‑bore, four‑pin layout of the M123.

The M114 V 25 (114.920) was the smaller‑displacement version of the redesigned cylinder block with symmetrical cylinder spacing, retaining the connecting rods and pistons of the M108. It also kept the Zenith carburettors and 9.0:1 compression. It was offered in the flagship 250 model of the new “/8” series.

It produced 130 hp (96 kW) at 5400 rpm and 20.3 kg·m (199 N·m) at 3600 rpm (piston speeds 14.1 m/s max, 9.5 m/s mean).

- 250/8 W114.010 sedan (07/12.1967 – 05.1972)
- 250C W114.021 coupé (10.1968 – 05.1972)

=== M114.980 ===
In late 1968 Mercedes‑Benz introduced the two‑door W114 coupé. Alongside the .920 engine for the 250C, a sister 250CE model was released with the M114 E 25 (114.980), featuring the new electronically controlled Bosch D‑Jetronic system—the first Mercedes‑Benz engine to receive this technology.

It produced 150 hp (110 kW) at 5500 rpm and 21.5 kg·m (211 N·m) at 4500 rpm (piston speeds 14.4 m/s max, 11.8 m/s mean).

- 250CE W114.022 coupé (10.1968 – 05.1972)

The M114 was replaced by the larger‑bore M130 in May 1972.

== 2.8‑litre (M130) ==
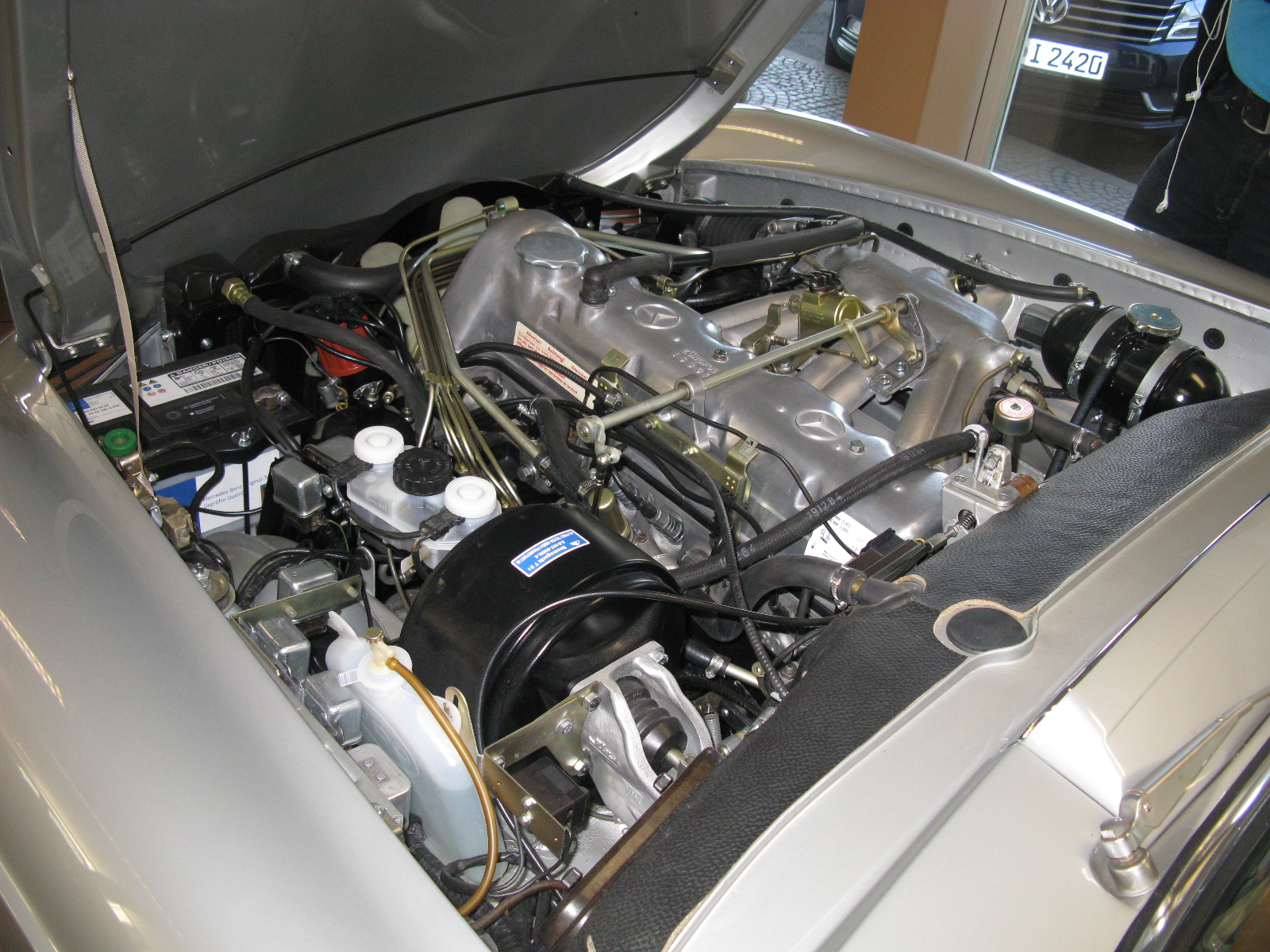
M130 in a W113 280SL “Pagoda”

=== M130.920 ===
The symmetrical cylinder block of the M114 allowed for another displacement increase. The bore was enlarged by 4.5 mm to 86.5 mm × 78.8 mm (3.41 in × 3.10 in), resulting in a 2.8 L (2,778 cc; 169.5 cu in) displacement—the maximum feasible for this block.

The carburetted version, the M130 V 28 (130.920) with 9.0:1 compression, was installed in the 280S for the 1968 model year.

- 280S W108.016 sedan (11.1967 / 01.1968 – 09.1972)

It was later replaced by the carburetted M110 DOHC engine in the W116 S‑Class.

=== M130.980 ===
The M130 E 28 (130.980) was the fuel‑injected version that superseded the M129 in the W108 sedans and W111 coupés and cabriolets.

It produced 160 hp (118 kW) at 5500 rpm and 24.5 kg·m (240 N·m) at 4250 rpm (piston speeds 14.4 m/s max, 11.2 m/s mean).

- 280SE W108.018 sedan (11.1967 / 01.1968 – 09.1972)
- 280SEL W108.019 long‑wheelbase sedan (01.1968 – 04.1971)
- 280SE W111.025 cabriolet (11.1967 / 02.1968 – 05.1971)
- 280SE W111.024 coupé (11.1967 / 02.1968 – 05.1971)

It was replaced by the fuel‑injected DOHC M110 engine in the S‑Class.

=== M130.981 ===
In parallel with solving the M108/M129 asymmetry issue, Mercedes‑Benz also retired the “big six” M189 engine that still powered the flagship 300 series.

The M130 E 28 (130.981) was slightly more powerful, producing 170 hp (125 kW) at 5750 rpm and 24.5 kg·m (240 N·m) at 4500 rpm.

- 300SEL W109.016 sedan (12.1967 / 02.1968 – 01.1970)

Production ended after the introduction of the M116 V8 in the 300SEL 3.5, which better suited the price expectations of customers for the air‑suspended W109.

=== M130.983 ===
The W113 Pagoda received the M130 E 28 (130.983) with more aggressive camshaft profiles.

It also produced 170 hp (125 kW) at 5750 rpm and 24.5 kg·m (240 N·m) at 4500 rpm (piston speeds 15.1 m/s max, 11.8 m/s mean).

- 280SL W113.044 roadster (11.1967 / 01.1968 – 03.1971)

It was replaced by the M110‑powered R107 280SL.

=== M130.923 ===
When the W114 coupé was launched, exporting it to markets with newly introduced emission controls posed bureaucratic hurdles. To compensate for power loss, for the 1969 model year the U.S.‑destined 250C was sold with the larger M130 engine. A year later, the 250 sedan for the 1970 model year also received the 2.8‑litre motor.

In April 1972, after the W108 was retired, Mercedes‑Benz made the M130‑powered W114 available on the home market. To avoid confusion with the M110‑powered 280 and 280C models that appeared simultaneously, the company kept the 250 badge and retired the M114 due to redundancy.

The M130 V 28 (130.923) had a lower 8.7:1 compression ratio. It produced 130 hp (96 kW) at 5000 rpm and 22 kg·m (216 N·m) at 3200 rpm (piston speeds 13.1 m/s max, 8.4 m/s mean).

- 250C W114.023 coupé (07.1969 – 08.1973)
- 250 W114.011 sedan (03/07.1970 – 08.1973)
- 250C W114.623 coupé (08.1973 – 06.1976)
- 250 W114.611 sedan (08.1973 – 07.1976)

It was replaced by the M123 engine in the W123 250 sedan . The W114 250C coupé did not receive a direct successor; instead, the C123 offered an entry‑level 230C model with the M115 four‑cylinder engine.

== 2.5‑litre (M123) ==
=== M123.920 ===
In 1975, with the launch of the W123, Mercedes‑Benz rationalised its six‑cylinder range. At that time the lineup included the veteran M180 in the 230.6, the 2.8‑litre M130 in the 250, and the flagship 280 and 280E with the 2.7‑litre M110.

Most 230.6 models were sold to commercial fleet customers. Shifting purchasing trends after the 1973 oil crisis reduced demand for the 250 series. Meanwhile, demand for M110‑powered vehicles—especially in the W116 S‑Class and the SL and SLC two‑door models—exceeded expectations, as customers chose these more economical entry‑level models over their V8 counterparts.

Because the M130 and M110 shared tooling, Mercedes‑Benz retired the M130 completely and transferred its production capacity to the M110. At the same time, the veteran M180 underwent a major redesign. The block retained the even cylinder spacing of the M130 and adopted the 86 mm bore to share pistons with the M110, optimising production. However, the stroke was shortened to 72.4 mm. The result was a very oversquare 86 × 72.4 mm geometry, yielding a 2.5 L (2,525 cc; 154.1 cu in) displacement.

The short stroke allowed Mercedes‑Benz to keep the four‑pin crankshaft with large bearing journals and no counterweights. This produced smooth mid‑ to high‑rpm operation but at the cost of high fuel consumption. As intended, most buyers were commercial fleet operators, particularly for stretched six‑door taxicabs. Private sales were less successful, especially after the modular M102 engine arrived in the 230E and 230TE in 1980, offering similar performance at lower cost and better economy. Sales plummeted, leading to the early retirement of the estate version in 1982.

Originally the M123 V 23 (123.920) had an 8.7:1 compression ratio and produced 129 hp (95 kW) at 5500 rpm and 196 N·m at 3500 rpm (piston speeds 13.2 m/s max, 8.4 m/s mean).

- 250 W123.026 sedan (07.1975 / 04.1976 – 09.1979)
- 250 V123.028 long‑wheelbase sedan (09.1977 – 09.1979)
- 250T S123.086 estate (09.1977 / 05.1978 – 09.1979)

In September 1979 a power increase came with a 9.0:1 compression ratio, raising output to 140 hp (103 kW) at 5500 rpm and 200 N·m at 3500 rpm (piston speeds 13.2 m/s max, 8.4 m/s mean).

- 250 W123.026 sedan (09.1979 – 12.1985)
- 250 V123.028 long‑wheelbase sedan (09.1979 – 12.1985)
- 250T S123.086 estate (09.1979 – 08.1982)

In 1985 this engine was replaced by the modular M103 engine in the 2.6‑litre displacement.

== Unimog ==
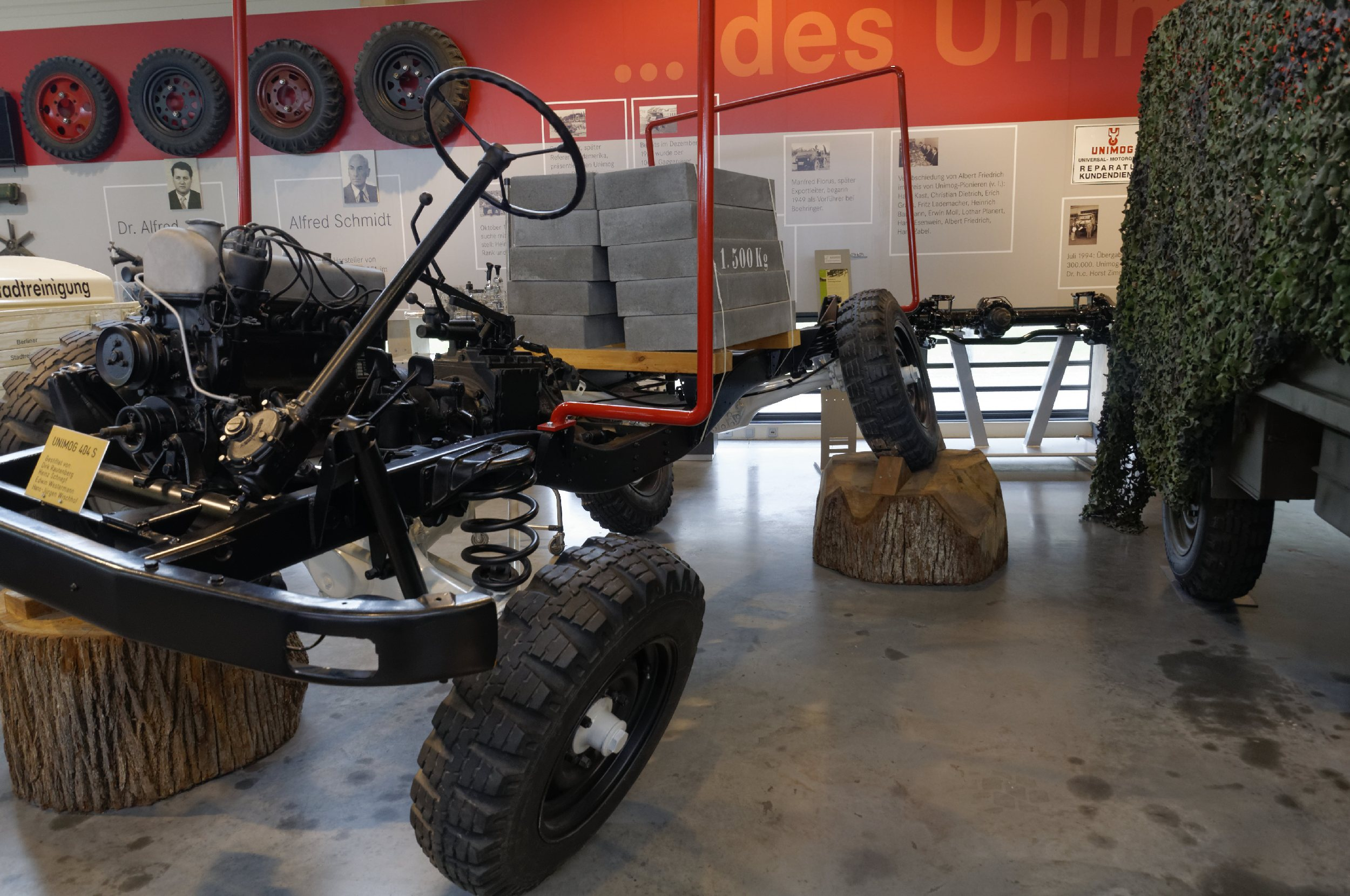
Unimog-Museum with twisted 404S chassis and M180 engine

From 1955 to 1980, the Unimog 404S 4WD truck was built for military use, within NATO, and elsewhere. A gasoline engine was required, and offroad capability. Lubrication had to work properly even if the vehicle was tilted at an angle. The 82hp M180.922 was used, later as M180.928, M180.953, M180.953.

When the 2.8 liter M130 became available, the factory since 1971 also offered 110hp M130.922 and 130.925. When the military Unimogs were sold of to private owners, many swapped of newer gas engines into the 404S chassis, or one of the more efficient Diesel engines from civil models like the Unimog 406.

== M110 ==
The final iteration of the family was the M110, featuring a cross‑flow DOHC 12‑valve cylinder head with hemispherical combustion chambers. A slightly reduced bore (86 mm × 78.8 mm (3.39 in × 3.10 in)) was chosen to protect the cylinder walls from the expected higher compression and rpm. Although covered in a separate article, it used the M130’s cylinder block and can be considered part of this engine family. It served as the flagship for the mid‑range W114 and W123 models and the entry‑level engine for the W116 and W126 S‑Classes, as well as the R107 SL and C107 SLC. Its replacement arrived in the form of the modular M103 in the larger 3.0‑litre displacement in 1985, but it continued to be used in the W460 280GE G‑Wagen until 1991.

== See also ==
- Mercedes-Benz M186 engine (3.0 liter)
- List of Mercedes-Benz engines
