= Mercedes-Benz W111 =

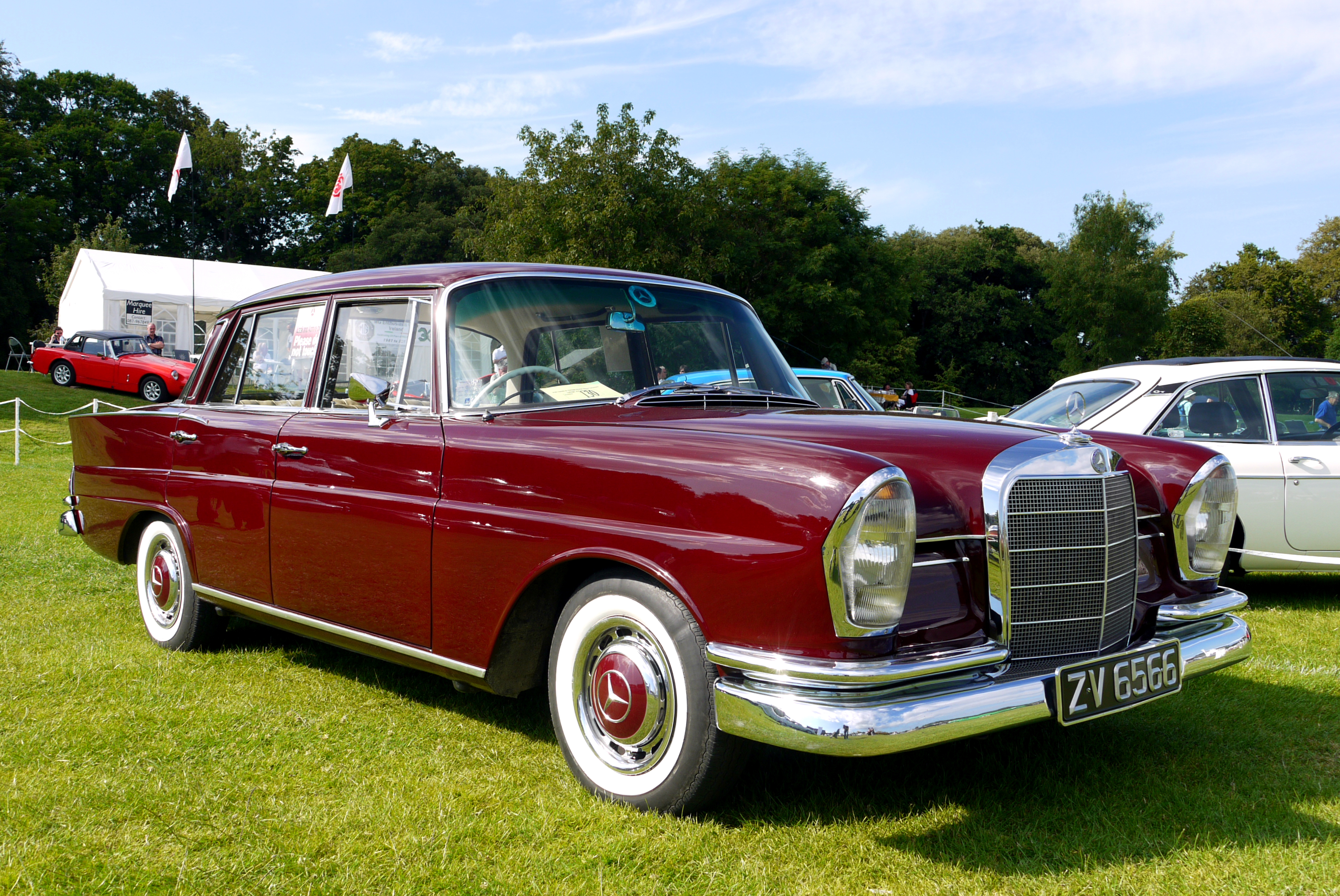
- 1964 220S W111

Overview
- Manufacturer: Mercedes-Benz
- Production: Saloon: August 1959 – January 1968; Coupé: February 1961 – July 1971; 370,807 built
- Assembly: West Germany: Stuttgart; Australia: Port Melbourne (AMI); South Africa: East London
- Designer: Friedrich Geiger; Paul Bracq (coupé & cabriolet)

Body and chassis
- Class: Full-size luxury car (F)
- Body style: 4-door saloon 2-door coupé 2-door convertible
- Layout: FR layout
- Related: Mercedes-Benz W110; Mercedes-Benz W112; Mercedes-Benz W113

Powertrain
- Engine: 2,195 cc (2.2 L) M127 I6; 2,306 cc (2.3 L) M180 I6; 2,496 cc (2.5 L) M129 I6; 2,778 cc (2.8 L) M130 I6; 3,499 cc (3.5 L) M116 V8
- Transmission: 4-speed manual

Chronology
- Predecessor: Mercedes-Benz W180
- Successor: Mercedes-Benz W108 (4-door); Mercedes-Benz C107 (2-door)

See Mercedes-Benz S-Class for a complete overview of all S-Class models.

The Mercedes-Benz W111 is a line of full-sized luxury cars produced by West German automaker Mercedes-Benz between 1959 and 1971, including four-door saloons (1959–1968) and two-door coupés and cabriolets (1961–1971). The saloons’ bodywork featured distinctive pointed tailfins that gave the models their Heckflosse nickname — German for "fintail".

Introduced with a 2.2-litre inline 6-cylinder engine, the W111 spawned a pair of bracketing variants in 1961: downscale entry-level inline 4-cylinder engined vehicles sharing the W111 chassis and bodies, designated the W110; and the high-end W112, a luxury saloon built on the W111 chassis with its body but exclusive features, elaborate appointments, and the Mercedes-Benz 300d Adenauer's fuel-injected 3-litre "big block" M189 six-cylinder engine – at the time the company's largest.

As with the preceding W180 and W128 series, both the W111 and W112 lines included 2-door coupé and cabriolet body styles distinct from the saloon. Designed by Paul Bracq, these specialty cars were shared between the two new series, and featured their own unique and significantly upscaled coachwork and interiors.

== Design ==
Mercedes-Benz emerged from World War II as an automaker in the early 1950s with the expensive and exclusive 300 Adenauers 300 S grand tourers that gained it fame, but it was the simple unibody Pontons which comprised the bulk of the company's revenues.

Work on replacing the Pontons began in 1956 with a design focused on passenger comfort and safety. The basic Ponton cabin was widened and squared off, with a large glass greenhouse improving driver visibility. A milestone in car design were front and rear crumple zones for absorbing kinetic energy on impact. The automaker also patented retractable seatbelts.

== Production history ==
=== Saloon ===
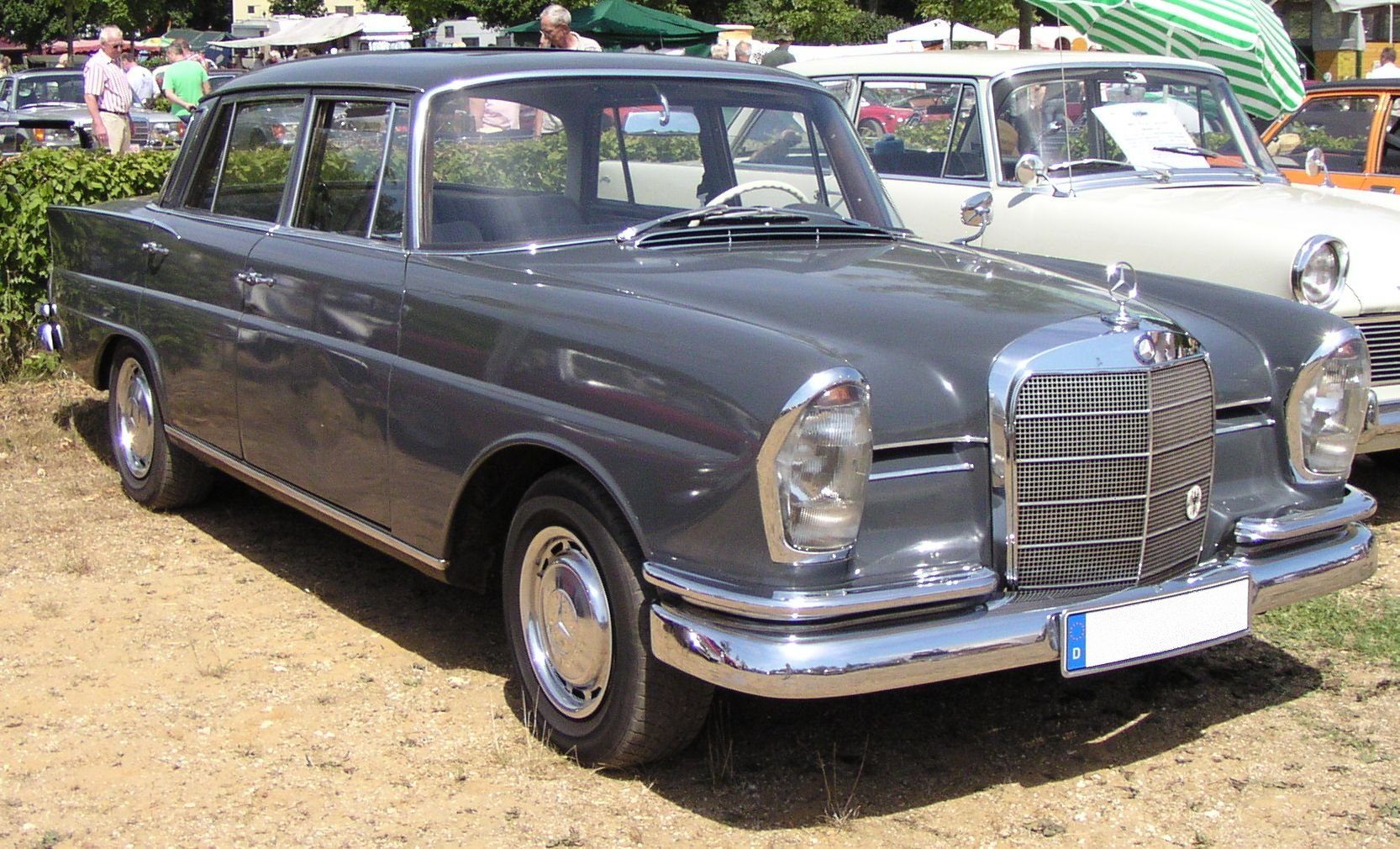
Mercedes-Benz 220 Sb

Series production of the 4-door saloon began in August 1959, which made its debut at the Frankfurt Auto Show in the autumn. Initially the series consisted of the 220 b, 220 Sb, and 220 SEb. These replaced the (W105) 219, the (W180) 220 S and the (W128) 220 SE Ponton saloons respectively. The 220b was an entry-level version with little chrome trim, simple hubcaps, and basic interior trim that lacked pockets in the doors. Prices were DM16,750, 18,500 and 20,500, with a rough sales ratio of 1:2:1.

All initial models shared the 2195 cc M127 straight-six engine carried over from the previous generation, producing 95 hp (71 kW) at 4800 rpm in the single carburetor 220b and capable of accelerating the heavy car to 160 km/h (155 if fitted with optional automatic gearbox). The 220 Sb featured twin carburetors and produced 110 hp (82 kW) at 5000 rpm, raising top speed to 165 km/h (103 mph) (160 km/h (99 mph)) and improving 0–100 km/h (62 mph) acceleration to 15 seconds (16 on the 220b). The top of the range 220 SEb featured Bosch fuel injection producing 120 hp (89 kW) at 4800 rpm, with a top speed of 172 km/h (107 mph) (168 km/h (104 mph) for auto) and a 0–100 km/h (62 mph) time of 14 seconds.

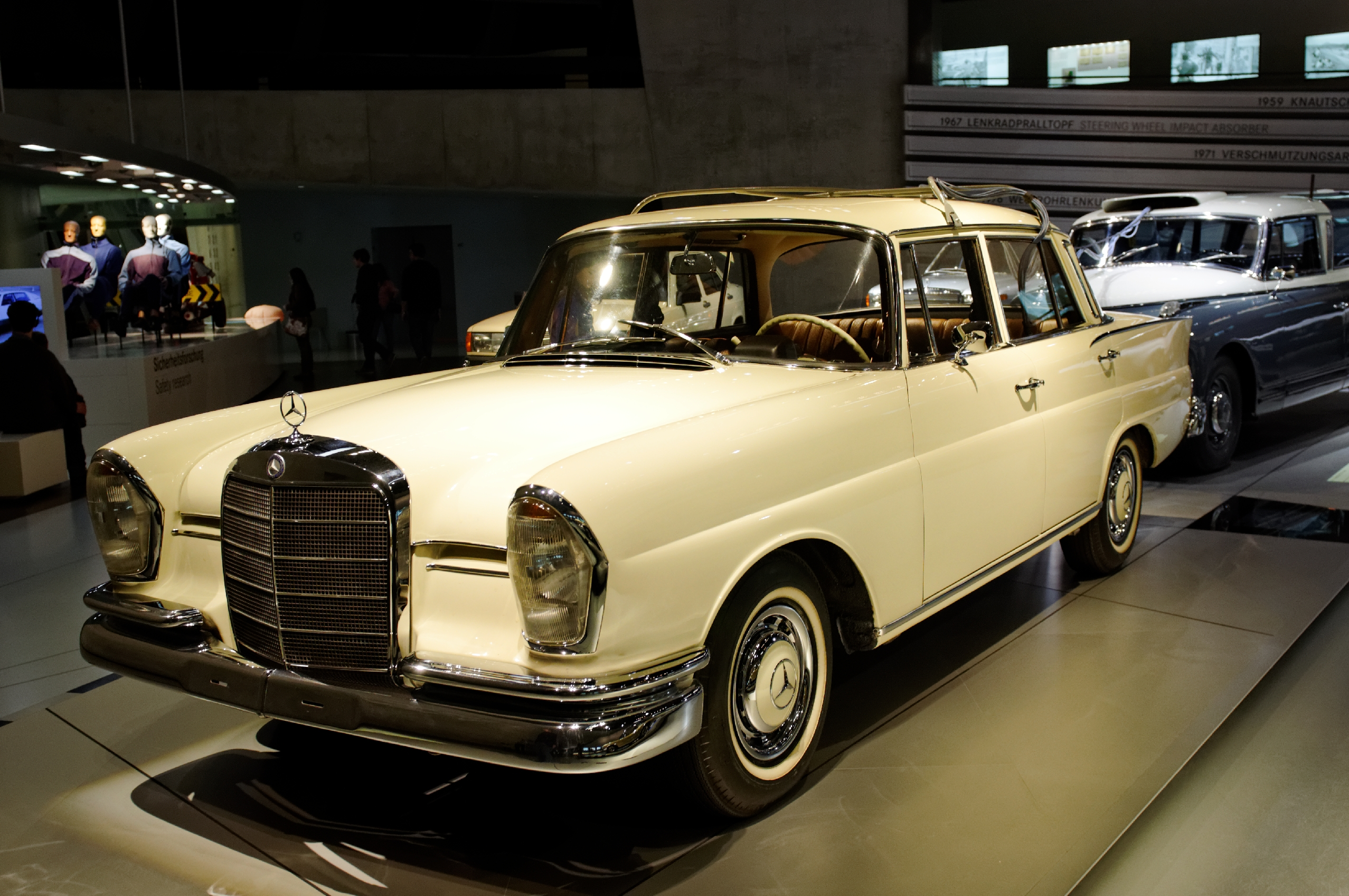
Mercedes-Benz W111 in the Mercedes-Benz Museum

In 1961, the W111 saloon chassis was shared both up and down in the Mercedes automobile line: downward with the more basic, shorter-bonneted, 4-cylinder W110 range, and upward with the company's top 4-door luxury saloon, the W112. It was built with the W111 body but fitted with the W189 300 “Adenauer’s”' larger block, fuel-injected 3-litre M189 6-cylinder engine. Dubbed the 300 SE, it was given many standard power features and a high level of interior and exterior trim.

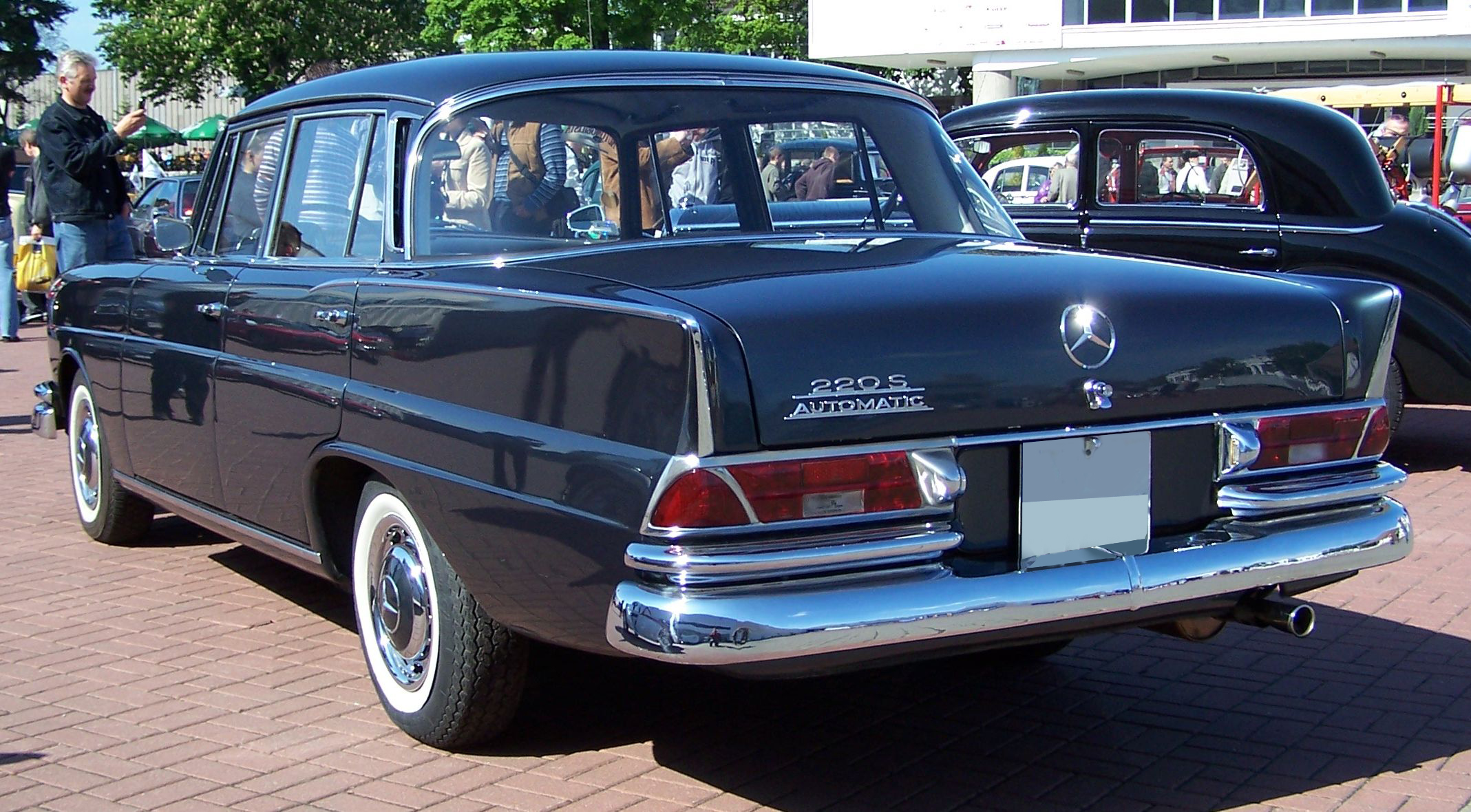
Mercedes-Benz 220 Sb

In May 1965, the 220 Sb and 220 SEb were replaced in the W111 lineup by the new 230 S. Beyond badging changes it was visually identical to the 220 Sb, with a more powerful modernised 2,306 cc (140.7 cu in) twin carburetor M180 engine producing 120 hp (89 kW) at 5400 rpm. Top speed was 176 km/h (109 mph) (174 km/h (108 mph), and acceleration from 0-100 km/h (62 mph) 13 seconds (15 with automatic transmission).

Throwing off convention, a downscaled successor to the 6-cylinder 220b was introduced into the previously 4-cylinder W110 line: the 2.3 L model 230 was a powered by a detuned single carburetor version of the M127 engine.

A total of 41,107 230 S models were built through January 1968, when the last of 4-door fintails left the production line.

A total of 337,803 W111 saloons were built between 1959 and 1968.

=== Coupé and cabriolet ===
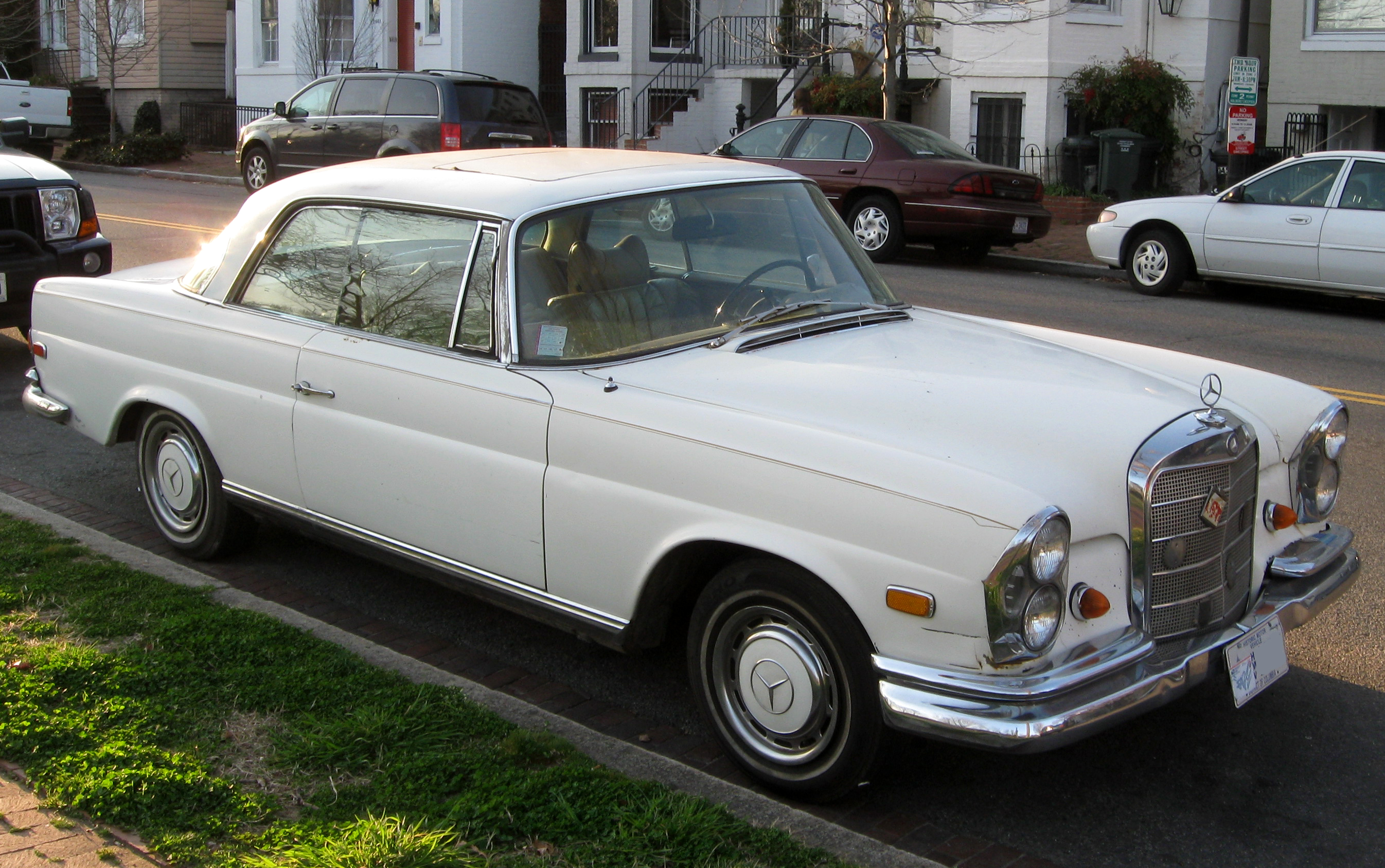
W111 Coupé, front (280 SE pictured)

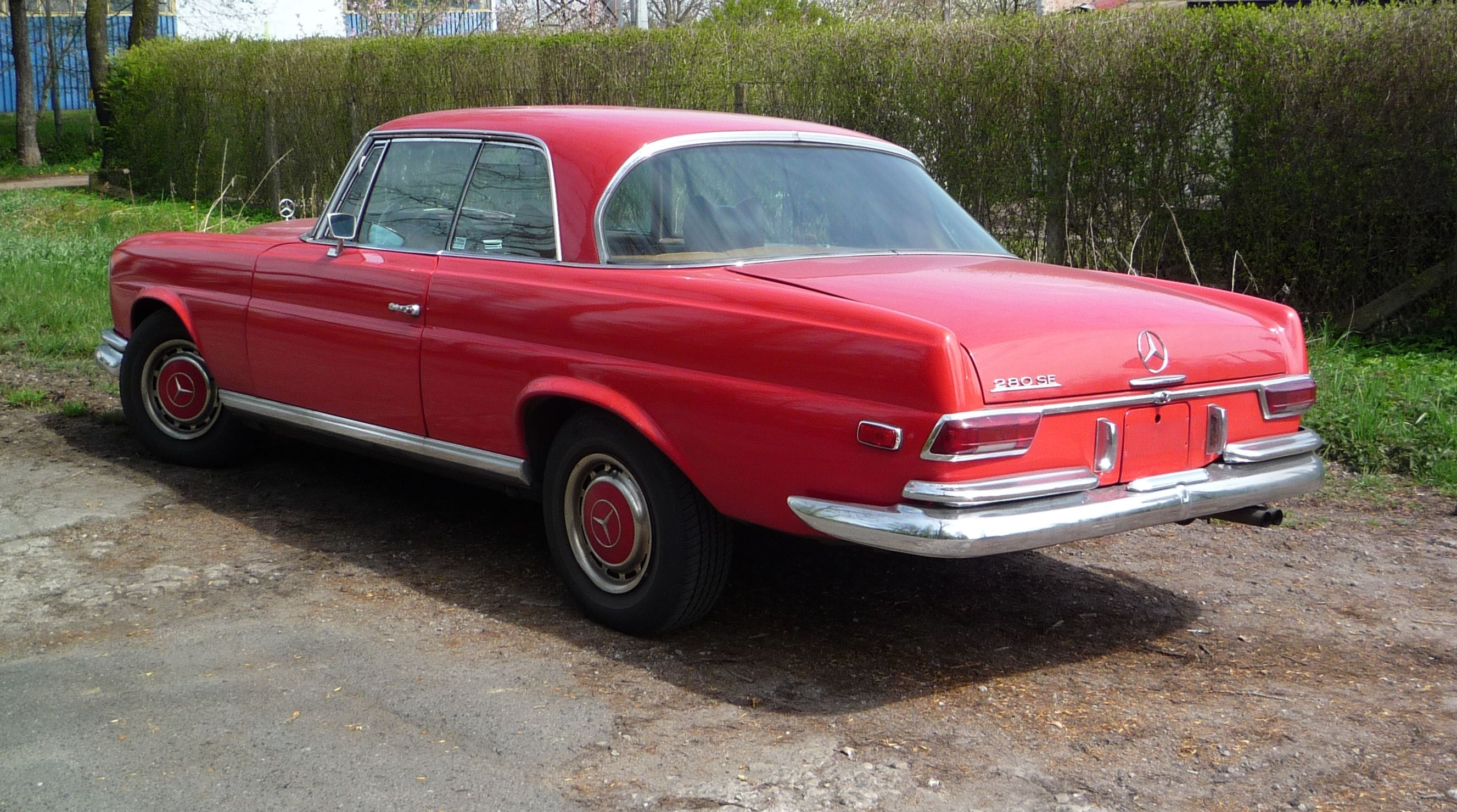
W111 Coupé, rear (280 SE pictured)

Design of a replacement for the graceful two-door W128 220 SE coupe and cabriolet began in 1957. Since most of the chassis and drivetrain were to be unified with the W111 saloon, the focus was on interior and exterior styling. Mercedes chose the work of designer Paul Bracq, which featured a more square, subtle rear-end treatment evocative of the clean modern styling of his mid-1960s W108/W109 to come than the pointed-fin Heckflosse adopted throughout the rest of the Mercedes model line. The result was the 220 SE, distinct from the rest of the W111 line (but ultimately sharing its bodywork with the 3.0 L M189 powered W112 300 SE coupe introduced a year later). Interiors were unique, and lavish compared to the W111 sedans.

Production began in late 1960, with the coupé making its debut at the 75th anniversary of the opening of Mercedes-Benz Museum in Stuttgart in February of the next year.

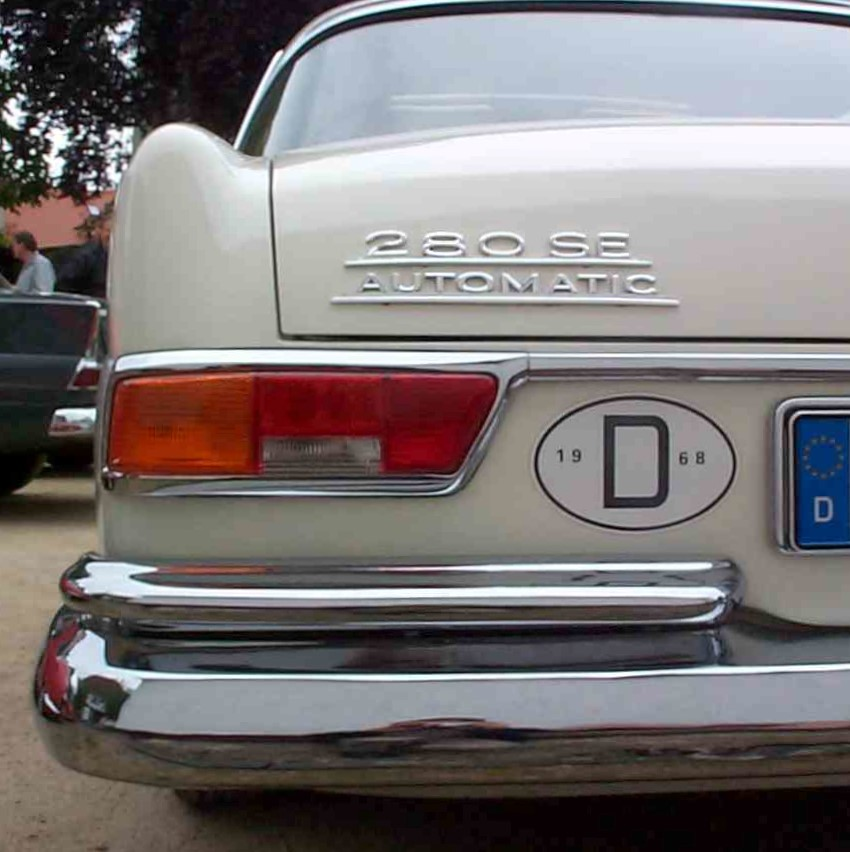
The fintails were almost gone on the two-door coupe and cabriolet

The convertible followed at the Frankfurt Auto Show a few months later. Almost identical to the coupé, its soft-top roof folded into a recess behind the rear seat and was covered by a tightly fitting leather "boot" in the same color as the seats.

Unlike the previous generation of two-door ponton series, the 220 SE designation was used for both the coupé and convertible; both received the same version of the 2.2 L M127 engine. Prices in 1962 were 32,500 for the coupé and 36,000 Dutch Guilders for the cabriolet. Options included a sliding sunroof for the coupé, automatic transmission, power steering, and individual rear seats.

In the summer of 1965, Mercedes-Benz launched replacements for the Ponton-derived W111 and W112 4-door sedans, the W108 and W109 respectively. With the tailfin fashion well eroded by the mid 1960s, the new design was based on the restrained 1961 W111 Bracq coupé, widened and squared off.

Capitalizing on this similarity, Mercedes avoided the considerable expense of redesigning the W111 and W112 coupe and cabriolet, which continued in production with only modest changes.

==== 250 SE ====
The 220 SE was superseded in early autumn 1965 by the 250 SE, which featured the new mechanically fuel-injected 2.5 L M129 engine. Producing 150 hp (112 kW) at 5500 rpm, it gave the vehicle a significant improvement in top speed, 193 km/h (120 mph) (188 km/h (117 mph) with automatic transmission), and 0–100 km/h (62 mph) acceleration time of 12 seconds (14 with automatic transmission). Visible changes include new 14-inch wheels, which came with new hub cabs and beauty rings accommodating the larger disc brakes and new rear axle from the W108 family.

==== 280 SE ====
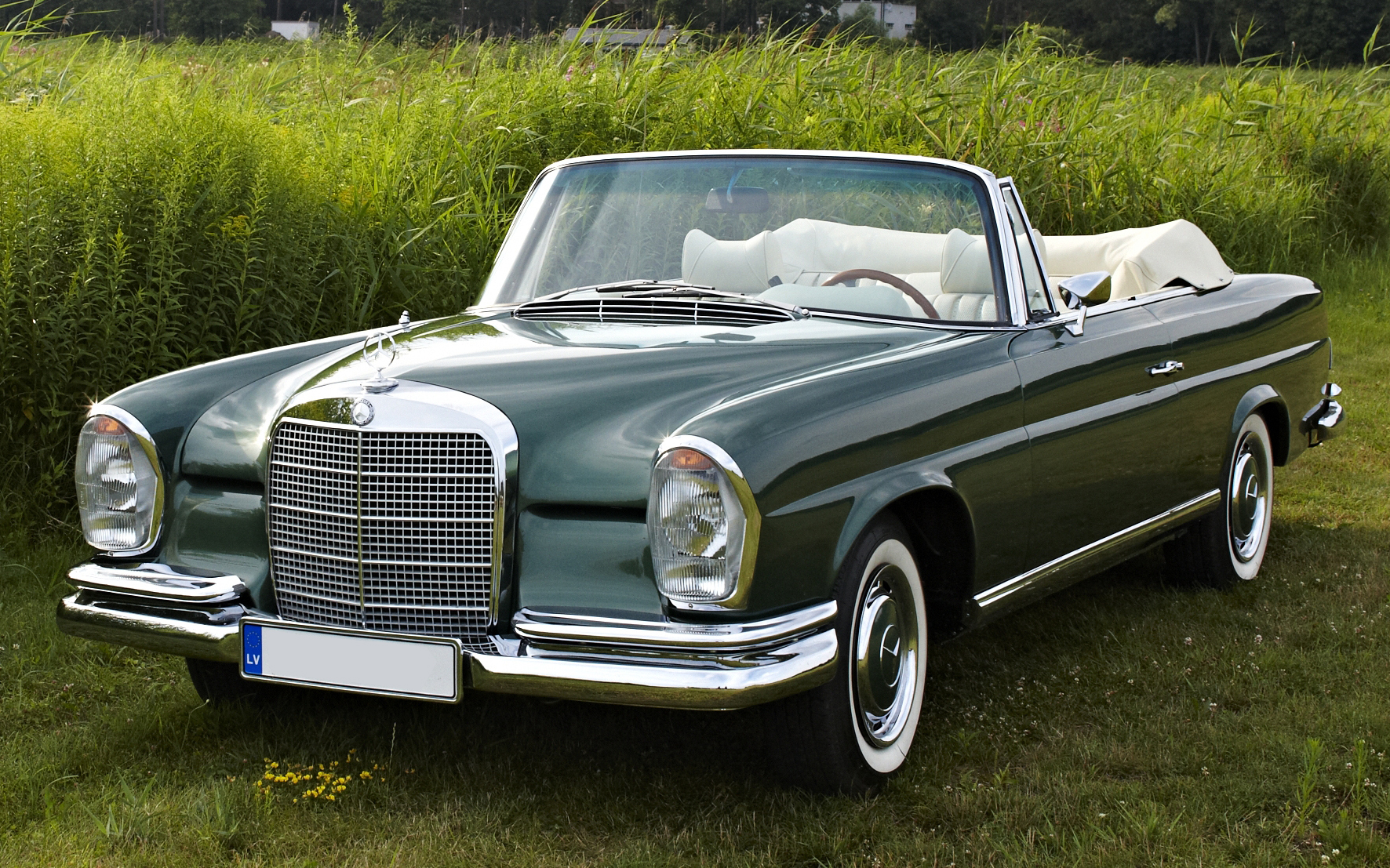
Though the W108 and W109 were only available as 4-door models, the much more exclusive - and expensive - Bracq-designed 2-door W111 and W112 coupés and cabriolets like this 1969 W111 280 SE are frequently mistaken for them

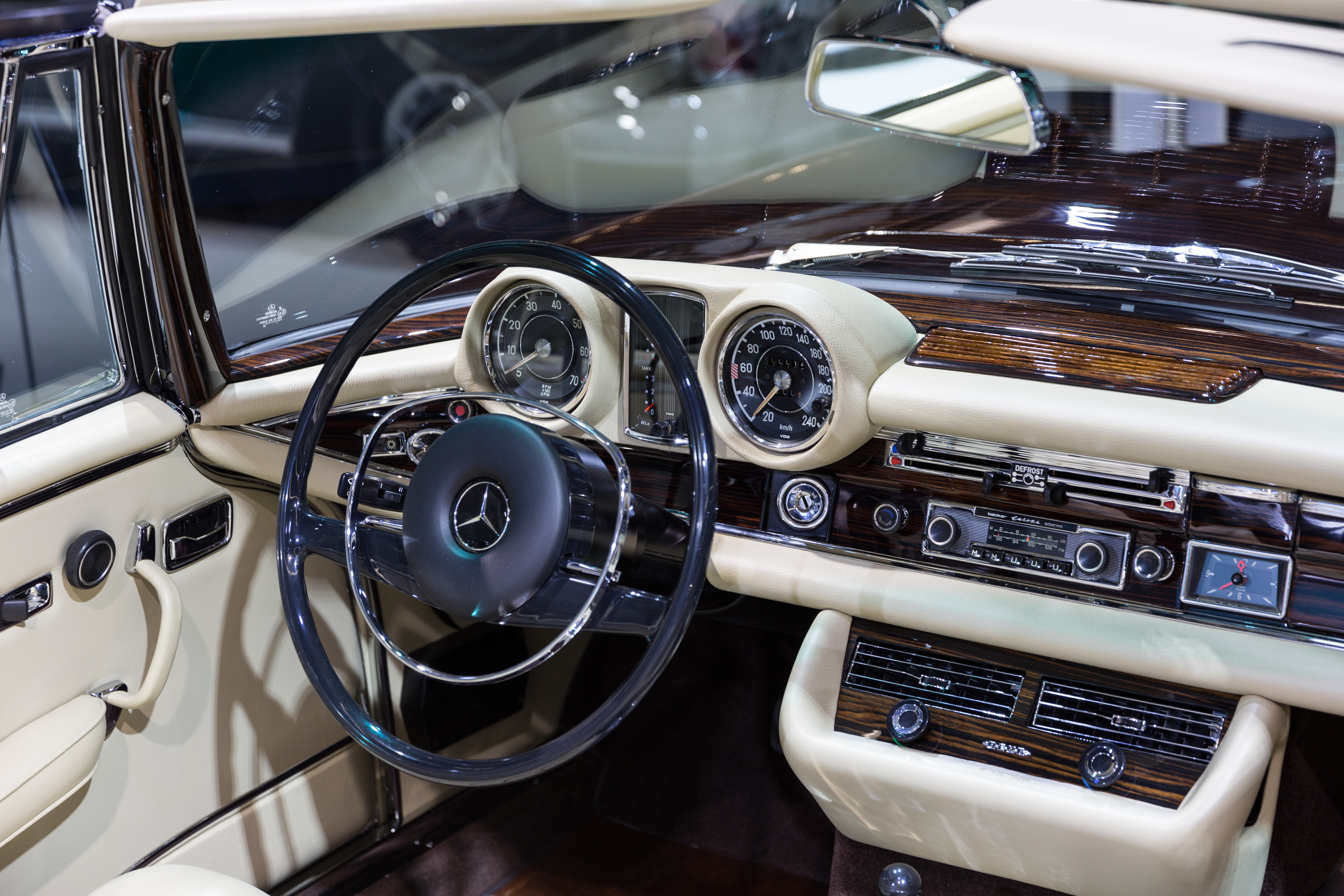
Mercedes-Benz W111 Cabriolet interior displays its extra level of luxury

In November 1967, the 250 SE was superseded by the 280 SE. It was powered by the new electrically fuel-injected 2.8 L M130 engine, which produced 160 hp (119 kW) at 5500 rpm. Top speed was hardly affected, but acceleration from 0-100 km/h (62 mph) improved to 10.5 seconds (13 with automatic transmission). Inside, the car received a wood veneer option on the dashboard and other minor changes, including door lock buttons and different heater levers. The hubcaps were changed yet again to a new one piece wheelcover, and the exterior mirror was changed.

Despite its smaller engine, 280 SE could outperform the larger, heavier M189-powered 300 SE, resulting in the engine’s retirement in the more expensive model.

280 SE 3.5

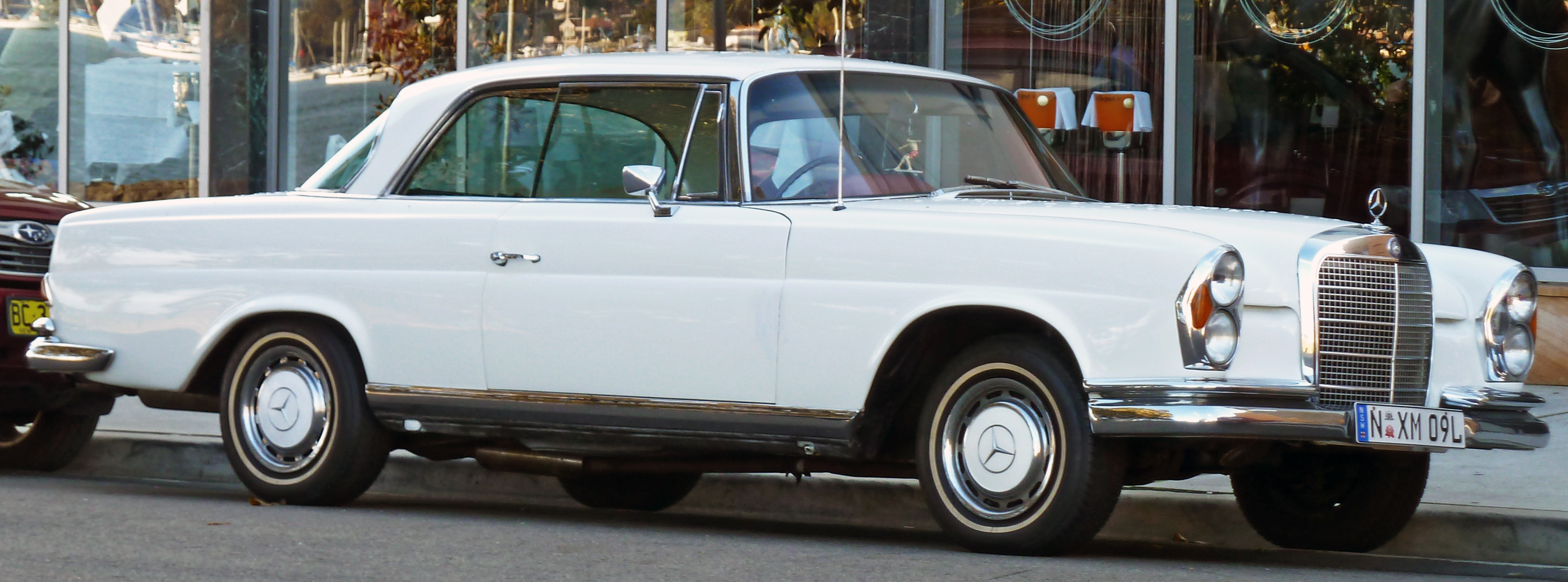
Mercedes-Benz upgraded the W111 280 SE to include an optional 3.5 L M116 V8

A final model was added in August 1969, the 280 SE 3.5, the first Mercedes post-War coupé with more than 3 litres. The car was fitted with the brand-new 3.5 L M116 V8. It produced 200 hp (150 kW) at 5800 rpm, and a top speed of 210 km/h (130 mph) (205 km/h (127 mph) with automatic transmission) and a 0-100 km/h (62 mph) at 9.5 seconds (11.5 for the automatic transmission). As one of several changes to modernize the aging design a lower, wider grille was incorporated and the facelifted model is often by the Germans referred to as the "flachkühler". The new grille was not a side-effect of enlarging the engine compartment to accommodate the V8 despite popular belief. Front and rear bumpers were also modified with the addition of rubber rub strips; the rear lenses changed to a flatter cleaner design. This change was carried across to the standard 280 SE. As the top of its range, the 280 SE 3.5 is seen in some ways as an ideological successor to the W112 300 SE coupe, though it lacked the W112's interior appointments, and air suspension.

There were plans to place the larger 4.5 L M117 V8 engine in the W111 (to create a 280 SE 4.5).

The last 280 SE was produced in January 1971, with the 280 SE 3.5 ending in July.

==== Production numbers ====
The total production over the decade was: 220 SEb - 16,902, 250 SE - 6,213, 280 SE - 5,187, and 280 SE 3.5 - 4,502 units. The grand total of 2-door W111 models was 32,804 of which 7,456 were convertibles.

==== Successor ====
The indirect replacement for the coupé was the C107 SLC, which was a hardtop coupé version of the SL roadster, with no link with the S Class range. The true successor of the W111/12 coupé was the C126 (SEC) coupé of 1981. As the R107 SL grew bigger and more luxury oriented, it assumed the position of the top of the range convertible, which meant the true four-seater convertible would disappear from Mercedes-Benz's lineup for nearly two-decades, until the A124 in 1992.

== Models ==
Model	Years	Chassis code	Engine	Displ.	Power	Built
220 Saloon	8/59–8/65	111.010	M180.940 / R 6	2195 cc	95 PS (70 kW; 94 hp)	69,691
220 S Saloon	8/59–8/65	111.012	M180.941 / R 6	2195 cc	105 PS (77 kW; 104 hp); 110 PS (81 kW; 108 hp)	161,119
220 SE Saloon	8/59–8/65	111.014	M127.982 / R 6	2195 cc	120 PS (88 kW; 118 hp)	66,086
220 SE Coupé	2/61–10/65	111.021	M127.984 / R 6	2195 cc	120 PS (88 kW; 118 hp)	14,173
220 SE Cabriolet	9/61–10/65	111.023	M127.984 / R 6	2195 cc	120 PS (88 kW; 118 hp)	2,729
230 S Saloon	7/65–1/68	111.010	M180.947 / 951 / R 6	2307 cc	120 PS (88 kW; 118 hp)	41,107
250 SE Coupé	9/65–12/67	111.021	M129.980 / 981 / R 6	2496 cc	150 PS (110 kW; 148 hp)	5,259
250 SE Cabriolet	9/65–12/67	111.023	M129.980 / 984 / R 6	2496 cc	150 PS (110 kW; 148 hp)	954
280 SE Coupé	11/67–5/71	111.024	M130.980 / 984 / R 6	2778 cc	160 PS (118 kW; 158 hp)	3,797
280 SE Cabriolet	11/67–5/71	111.025	M130.980 / 984 / R 6	2778 cc	160 PS (118 kW; 158 hp)	1,390
280 SE 3.5 Coupé	11/69–7/71	111.026	M116.980 / 990 / V 8	3499 cc	200 PS (147 kW; 197 hp)	3,270
280 SE 3.5 Cabriolet	11/69–7/71	111.027	M116.980 / 990 / V 8	3499 cc	200 PS (147 kW; 197 hp)	1,232

== Model timeline ==
Chassis	Type	1959	1960	1961	1962	1963	1964	1965	1966	1967	1968	1969	1970	1971
W111	Saloon	220
W111	Saloon	220 S
W111	Saloon	220 SE
W111	Saloon							230 S
W111	Coupé & Cabriolet			220 SE
W111	Coupé & Cabriolet							250 SE
W111	Coupé & Cabriolet									280 SE
W111	Coupé & Cabriolet											280 SE 3.5
