= Mercedes-Benz Type 300 =

Mercedes-Benz Type 300 may refer to the following automobiles:

- Types 300, 300b, and 300c, versions of the four-door Mercedes-Benz W186 ("Adenauer"), produced 1951–1957
- Types 300 S and 300 Sc, versions of the two-door Mercedes-Benz W188 sports tourer, produced 1951–1958
- Type 300d, the four-door Mercedes-Benz W189 ("Adenauer"), produced 1957–1962
