= Mercedes-Benz 300 =

Mercedes-Benz has sold a number of automobiles with the "300" model name:

- 1951–1957 W186
  - 1951–1957 300
- 1951–1958 W188
  - 1951–1958 300S
- 1954–1963 W198
  - 1954–1963 300SL
- 1958–1962 W189
  - 1958–1962 300d
- 1961–1965 W112
  - 1961–1965 300SE
  - 1962–1965 300SEL
- 1965–1967 W108
  - 1965–1967 300SEb
- 1965–1972 W109
  - 1965–1970 300SEL
  - 1968–1972 300SEL 6.3
  - 1969–1972 300SEL 3.5
  - 1971–1972 300SEL 4.5
- 1975–1976 W115
  - 1975–1976 300D
- 1977–1985 W123
  - 1977–1985 300D
  - 1978–1985 300CD
  - 1979–1985 300TD
  - 1982-1985 300D Turbodiesel
  - 1982-1985 300CD Turbodiesel
  - 1981-1985 300TD Turbodiesel
- 1978–1980 W116
  - 1978–1980 300SD Turbodiesel
- 1986–1995 W124
  - 1986–1993 300E
  - 1987 300D Turbo
  - 1987 300TD Turbo
  - 1988–1989 300CE
  - 1988–1993 300TE
  - 1990–1992 300CE-24
  - 1990–1993 300D 2.5 Turbo
  - 1990–1992 300E 2.6
  - 1990–1993 300E 4MATIC
  - 1990–1993 300TE 4MATIC
  - 1993 300E 2.8
  - 1993 300E 3.2
  - 1993 300CE 3.2
  - 1993 300TE 3.2
  - 1995 E300 Diesel
- 1981–1991 W126
  - 1981–1985 300SD Turbodiesel
  - 1986–1987 300SDL Turbo
  - 1988–1991 300SEL
  - 1989–1991 300SE
- 1990–1993 R129
  - 1990–1993 300SL-24
- 1992–1993 W140
  - 1991–1993 300SD 3.5 Turbodiesel
  - 1992–1993 300SE 3.2
- 1996–1999 W210
  - 1996–1997 E300 Diesel
  - 1998–1998 E300 Turbodiesel
- 2008–2009 W211
  - 2008–2009 E300 BlueTEC
- 2006–2013 W221
  - 2006–2013 S300
- 2010–2014 W204
  - 2011–2014 C300
  - 2012–2014 C300 CDI
- 2010–2016 W212
  - 2010–2014 E300
  - 2010–2014 E300 CDI
  - 2014–2016 E300 BlueTEC
  - 2013–2016 E300 BlueTEC HYBRID
- 2013–2020 W222
  - 2013–2017 S300 BlueTEC HYBRID
- 2014–2021 W205
  - 2015–2021 C300
  - 2015–2021 C300d
  - 2019–2021 C300e
  - 2019–2021 C300de
- 2016–present W213
  - 2016–present E300
  - 2019–present E300d
  - 2019–present E300e
  - 2019–present E300de
- 2021–present W206
  - 2021–present C300
  - 2021–present C300d
