= 300D =

300D may refer to:

- Canon EOS 300D, a digital single-lens reflex camera
- Various vehicles produced by Mercedes-Benz: see Mercedes-Benz 300 (disambiguation) for full list
- Mercedes-Benz 300d or Mercedes-Benz W189, a car produced 1957–1962
