= Mercedes-Benz W112 =

Car model

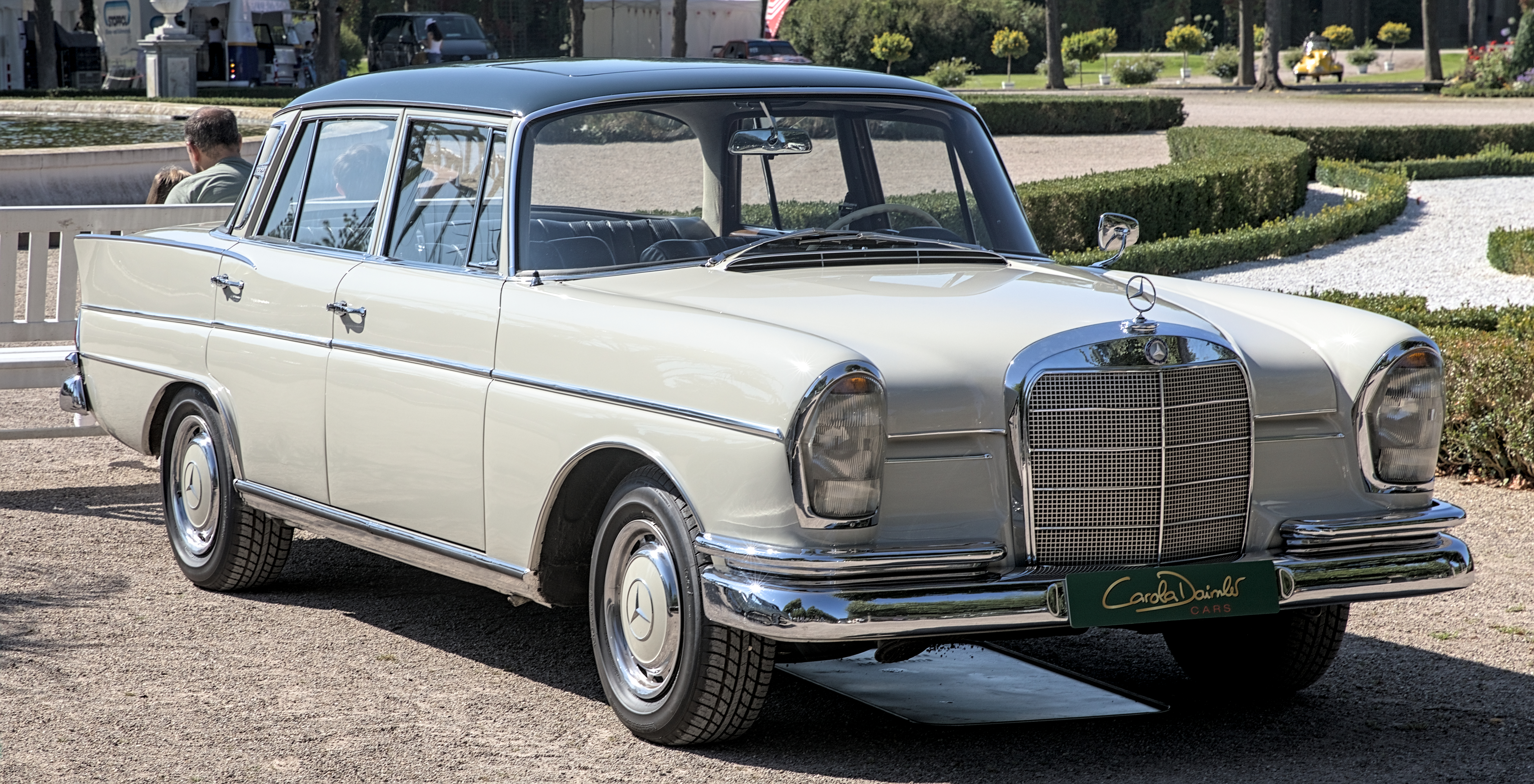
- Mercedes-Benz 300 SE (W112)

Overview
- Manufacturer: Mercedes-Benz
- Also called: 300SE / 300SE long
- Production: 1961–1965 (4-door); 1962–1967 (2-door)
- Assembly: West Germany: Stuttgart; Untertürkheim
- Designer: Friedrich Geiger; Paul Bracq (coupé & cabriolet)

Body and chassis
- Class: Full-size luxury car
- Body style: 4-door sedan 2-door coupe 2-door convertible
- Layout: FR layout
- Related: Mercedes-Benz W111; Mercedes-Benz W113

Powertrain
- Engine: 2996 cc M189 I6

Chronology
- Predecessor: Mercedes-Benz W189 (4-door); Mercedes-Benz W188 (2-door)
- Successor: Mercedes-Benz W109 (4-door); Mercedes-Benz W111 (280SE 3.5, 2-door)

The Mercedes-Benz W112 is a luxury automobile produced by Mercedes-Benz from 1961 to 1967. Marketed as the 300SE, it was available as a standard sedan (its principal form), stretched sedan (Lang), and distinct coupé and convertible.

The sedan is based on the Mercedes-Benz W111 Fintail chassis and coachwork. The 300SE coupe/convertible was introduced in February 1962, and shares its more restrained and elegant Paul Bracq designed bodywork and interior with the Mercedes-Benz W111 220SE coupe/convertible. The stretched wheelbase 300SE "Lang" sedan appeared in March 1963, redesignated the 300SEL in 1964.

These high-end cars were the top of the Mercedes range until the introduction of the much larger, ultra-luxurious 600 series in 1963. They were fitted with the 3.0 litre fuel-injected M189 big-block six-cylinder engine, at the time of the model's introduction the company's largest. All were finished with a higher level of wood and leather trim than the corresponding W111, and had standard luxury features such as power steering, automatic transmission, and pneumatic self-levelling suspension, an enhancement of the former flagship Mercedes-Benz 300d Adenauer's dashboard activated mechanical torsion bar based system.

== Background ==
After nearly a decade of great success throughout the 1950s, the aging Mercedes-Benz W189 flagship, the 300d Adenauer limousine, needed a replacement. Until the Mercedes-Benz 600 Grosser could be developed a stopgap would have to do. The W112 300SE was the result.

The previous generation of Mercedes models had featured three types of chassis:

- those mass-produced on a unibody (known as the Ponton), which included the entry-level 4-cylinder 180/190 series sedans and luxury 190SL (W121) roadster, and mid-range 220 series of sedans and luxury coupe and convertible;
- a luxury range of coachwork-built 300-series built autos on an X-frame (which included limousines (300 "Adenauer" (W189) sedans and cabriolets), grand tourers (300 S and Sc (W188) coupe and convertible); and a roadster (300 SL (W198)); and,
- the exotic 300SL "Gullwing" (W198) coupe, hand-built on an alloy-steel tubular frame.

In the late 1950s, Daimler-Benz AG began plans to unify its entire model range on one platform to take advantage of economies of scale. Assembly of all 2-door body-on-frame (W188) 300Sc ended in 1958. That year the fuel-injected W128 220SE "Ponton" was introduced. The new generation of 220/220S/200SE W111 "Fintail" sedans was introduced in 1959. These were joined in 1961 by the Bracq-designed 220SE W111 coupe and convertible, as well as the four-cylinder W110 W110 190 and 190D.

With the debut of the clean sheet, top-of-the-range W100 600 still several years off, Mercedes turned to its largest platform, the W111, added the fuel-injected 3-litre six-cylinder M189 engine from the 300d, and supplemented it with luxury features and detailing, to create the W112.

== Features ==
Externally the W112 displayed substantially more chrome, and luxury features such as power steering, air suspension, and automatic transmission were standard (though a manual transmission would return as an option). The car cost almost twice the price of the top W111 model, the 220SE.

== Performance ==
The 300SE's performance was the top of the Mercedes sedan line, with the M189 six-cylinder engine producing 160 hp (170 after 1964) and giving a top speed of 180 km/h (190 after 1964, both figures 175 and 185 for automatic transmission respectively).

== Position in model range ==
=== Sedan ===
The W111-based W112 had always been a compromise for Mercedes-Benz, which for the first time did not have a separate platform for its most expensive and prestigious model. Instead, it was forced to share a chassis that cascaded all the way down to a 220S.

To attempt to compensate, the W112 received the company's largest engine, the mechanically fuel-injected 3.0 litre M189, was given luxurious appointments and features, and a great deal of chrome. As the W112 sedan platform was much smaller than either the (W189) 300 Adenauer limousine that preceded it, or the imposing (W100) 600 Grosser Mercedes set to appear in 1963, a long-wheelbase version was created, debuting in March 1963 to try to fill the enormous vacuum below the 600. Although the stretched 300SE was equivalent to an "SEL" in size and spaciousness, that designation (reflecting an L added an for "Lang", "long" in German), did not arrive until the subsequent W108 and W109 models.

While the W112 was always a very exclusive automobile, its low production numbers reflect a combination of a very high price and limited demand, as it lacked the size, overwhelming luxury, and cachet of the top of the range 300d and 600 flagships which bracketed its production, in addition to being too similar to the mass-produced W110s (which were common as taxicabs) and W111s. In 1962, for every W112 sedan 24 W111s rolled off the production line, while by 1964 this ratio approached 40 to 1. In the end, the W112 sedan turned out to be very short-lived. In 1962, the last year of the W189 300d, a total of 2,769 W112s of all models were built. With the company's top niche filled in 1963 by the 600, sales plummeted to less than half, just 1,382 units. Pending the arrival of the W108/109 series in 1965, sedan W112 production was dropped (but the Bracq-bodied coupe and cabriolet models continued on). A total of 5,202 300SE sedans in standard and long wheelbase were built over its five-year run, 3,656 short and 1,546 long.

=== Coupe and Cabriolet ===
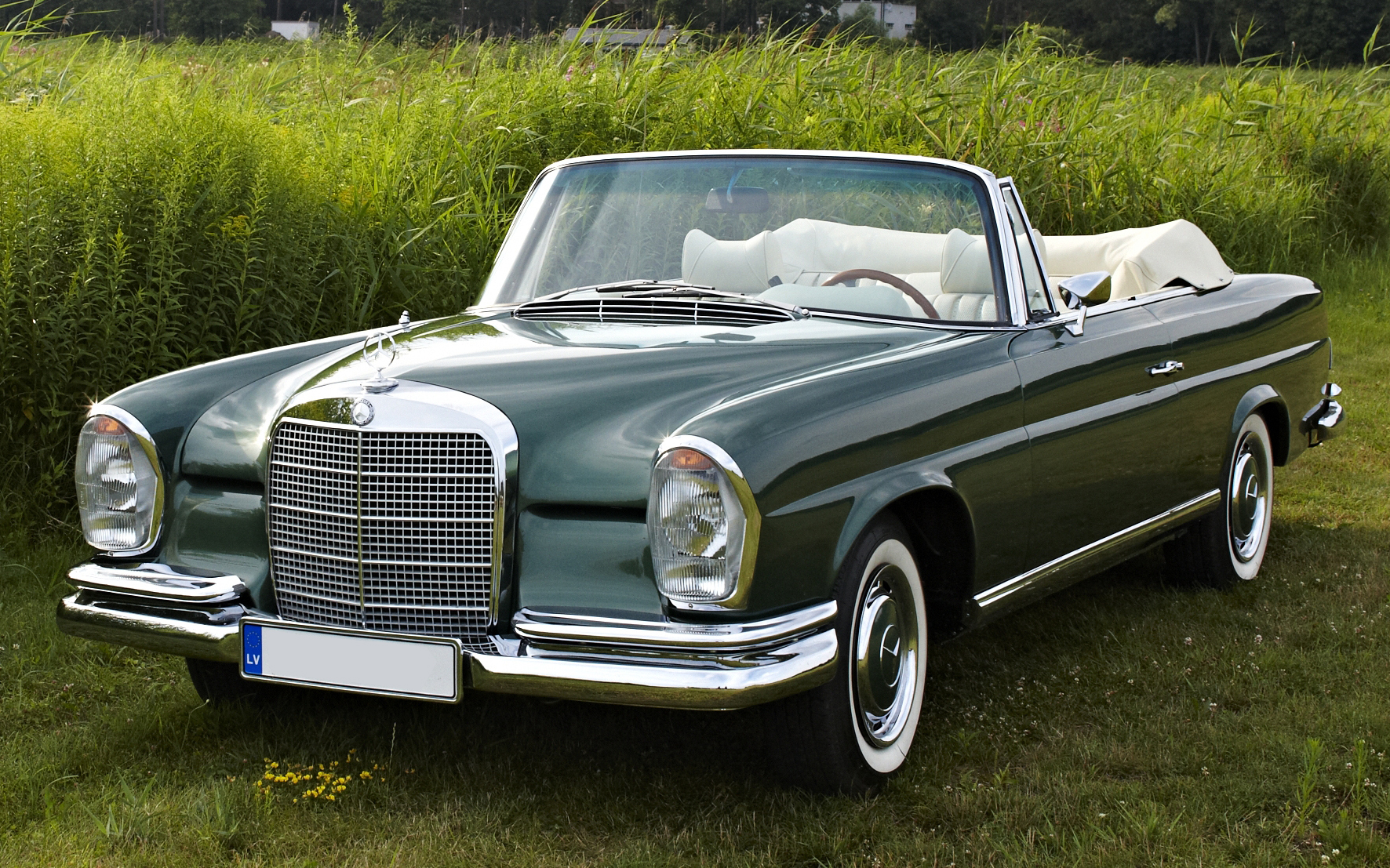
Though the W108 and W109 were only available as 4-door models, the much more exclusive - and expensive - Bracq-designed 2-door W111 and W112 coupés and cabriolets like this 1969 W111 280SE are frequently mistaken for them

Upscale coupe and cabriolet versions of the W111 had debuted in 1961 as the 220SE. Their strikingly more modern, elegant Paul Bracq designed bodywork lacked the badly dating upwardly-raked pointed fintails of the sedans, and aged much better.

In 1962 the more luxurious yet 3.0 litre M189 engine powered 300SE coupe and cabriolet appeared. These exclusive, top-of-the-range specialty cars had no equal or superior of their type in the company and enjoyed an elevated status through their model runs. Reflecting this, five 220SE cabriolets, for example, sold to every equivalent 300SE.

Production of both W111 and W112 range two-doors continued after the 1965 coming of the new generation W108/W109 sedans.

In November 1967 the 300SE coupe and cabriolet's aging mechanically fuel-injected M189 was replaced by a new 2.8 litre electronically fuel-injected straight-6 used in the W111 280SE. At least one 300SE cabriolet with an M189 engine was produced for the Frankfurt Auto show with updated equipment and styling for the 1968 standards, but the line was discontinued before the new year for all two-door W112 autos. A total of 2,419 coupes and cabriolets were built.

== Racing ==
The 300SE sedan was entered in international and European Touring Car Challenge and won several rallies.

== Models ==
- 1961–1965 300 SE Sedan (5,202 built)
- 1962–1967 300 SE Coupé (2,419 built)
- 1962–1967 300 SE Cabriolet (708 built)
- 1963–1965 300 SE long long-wheelbase Sedan (1,546 built, often wrongly referred to as the 300 SEL, a designation not used until 1966)
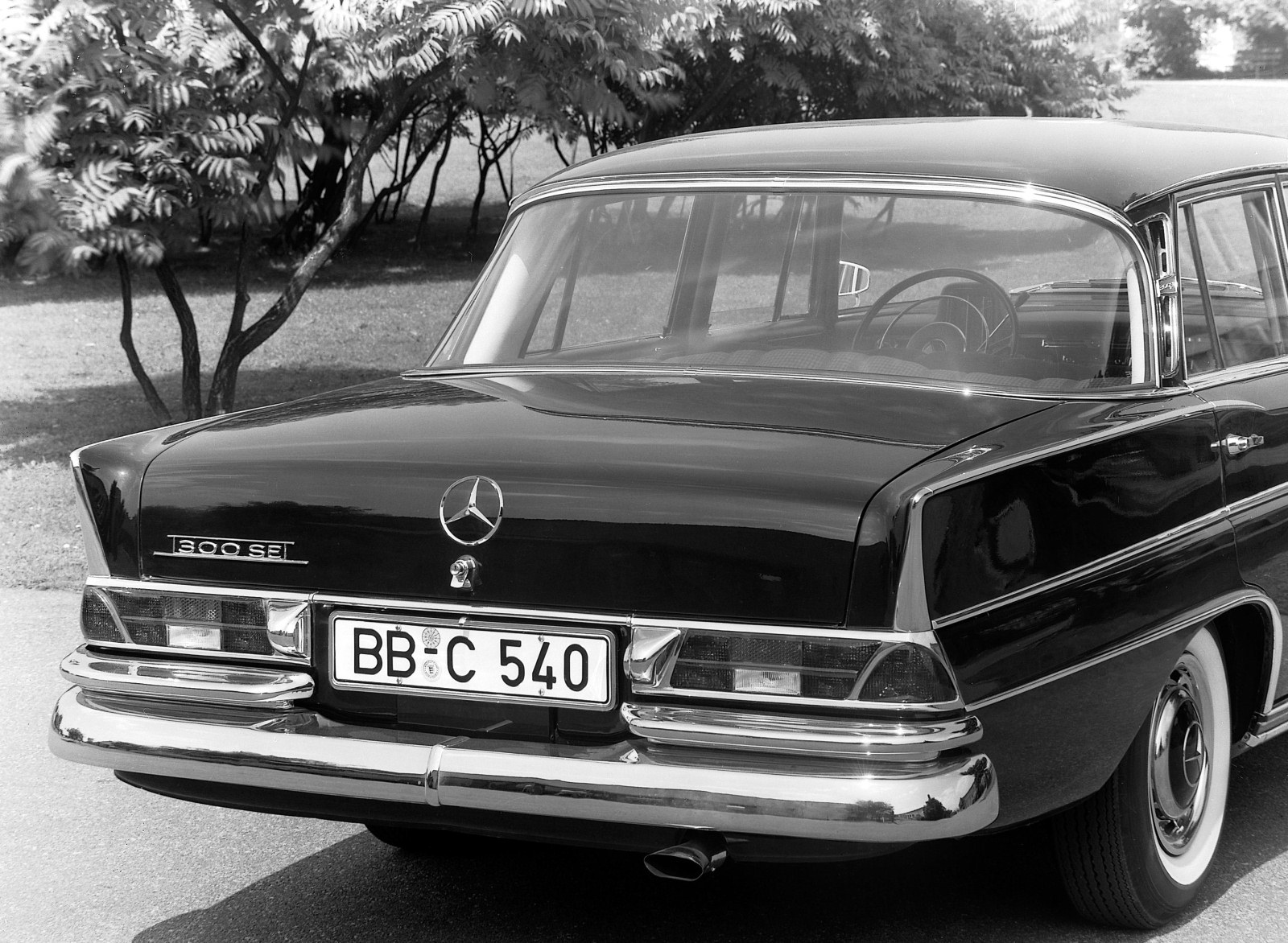
Mercedes-Benz 300 SE Sedan (W112)

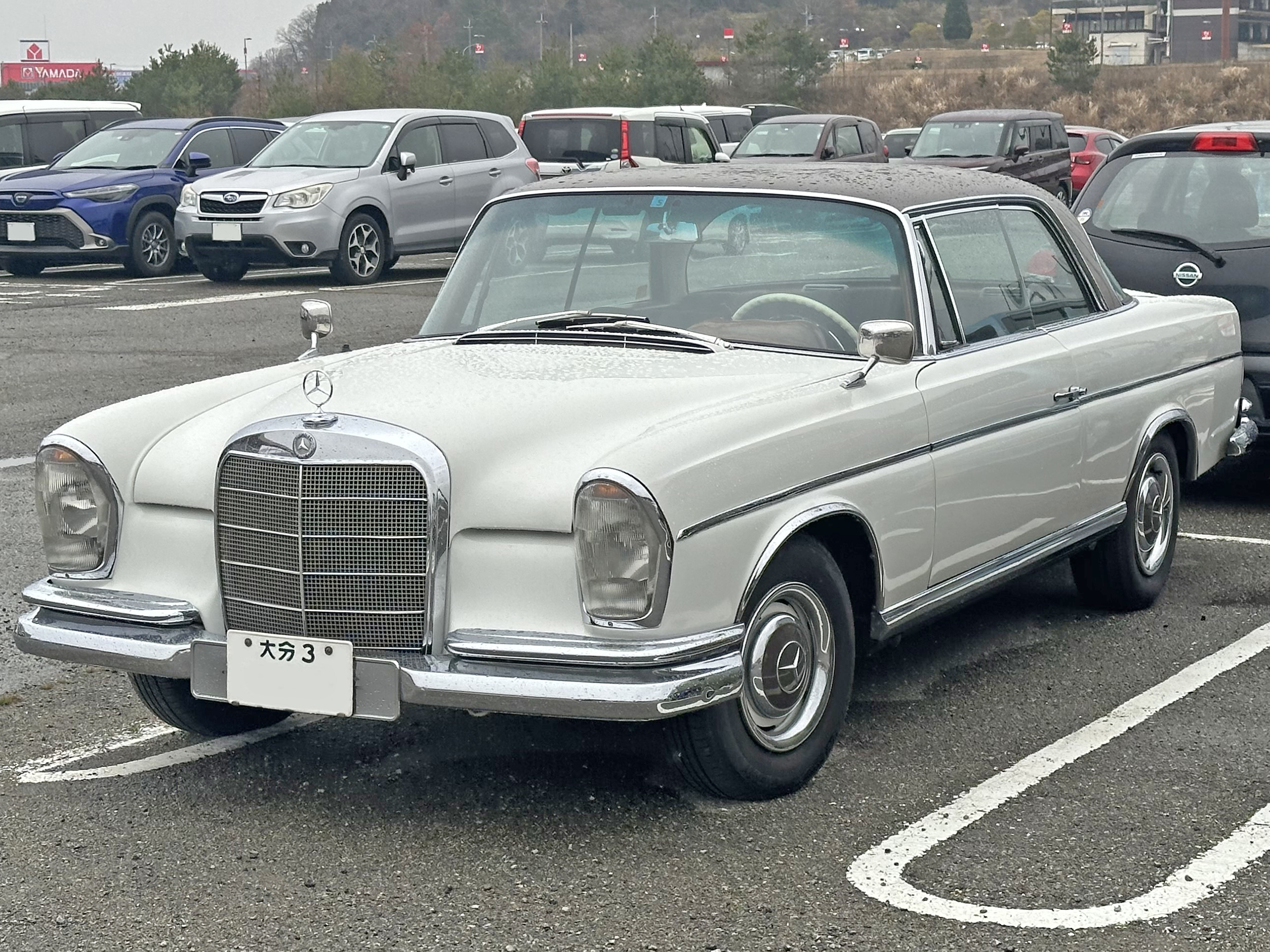
Mercedes-Benz 300 SE Coupe (W112)

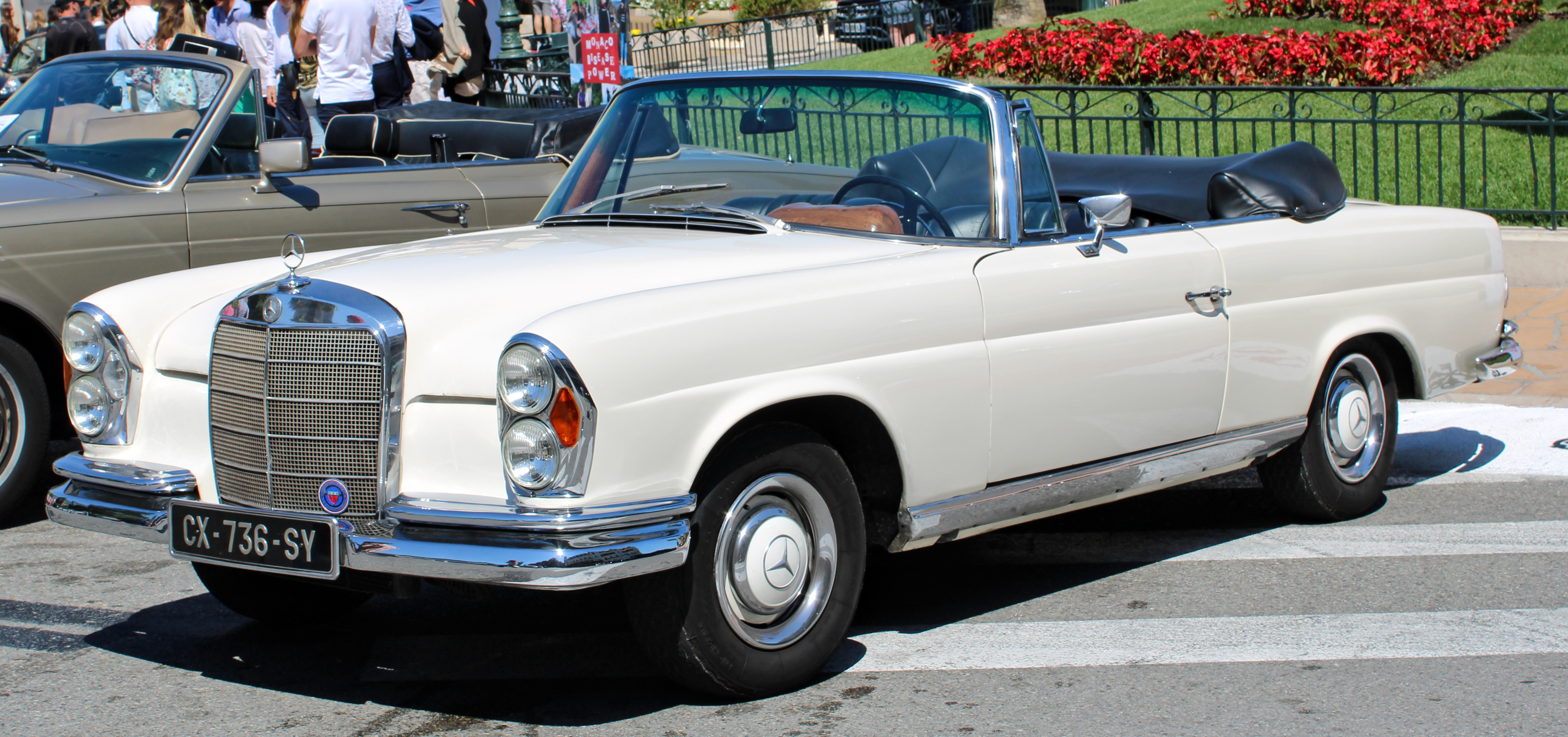
Mercedes-Benz 300 SE Cabriolet (W112)

=== Model timeline ===
Chassis	Type	1961	1962	1963	1964	1965	1966	1967
W112	sedan	300SE
W112	sedan			300SE long
W112	coupé		300SE
W112	cabriolet (convertible)		300SE
