= Mercedes-Benz M186 engine =

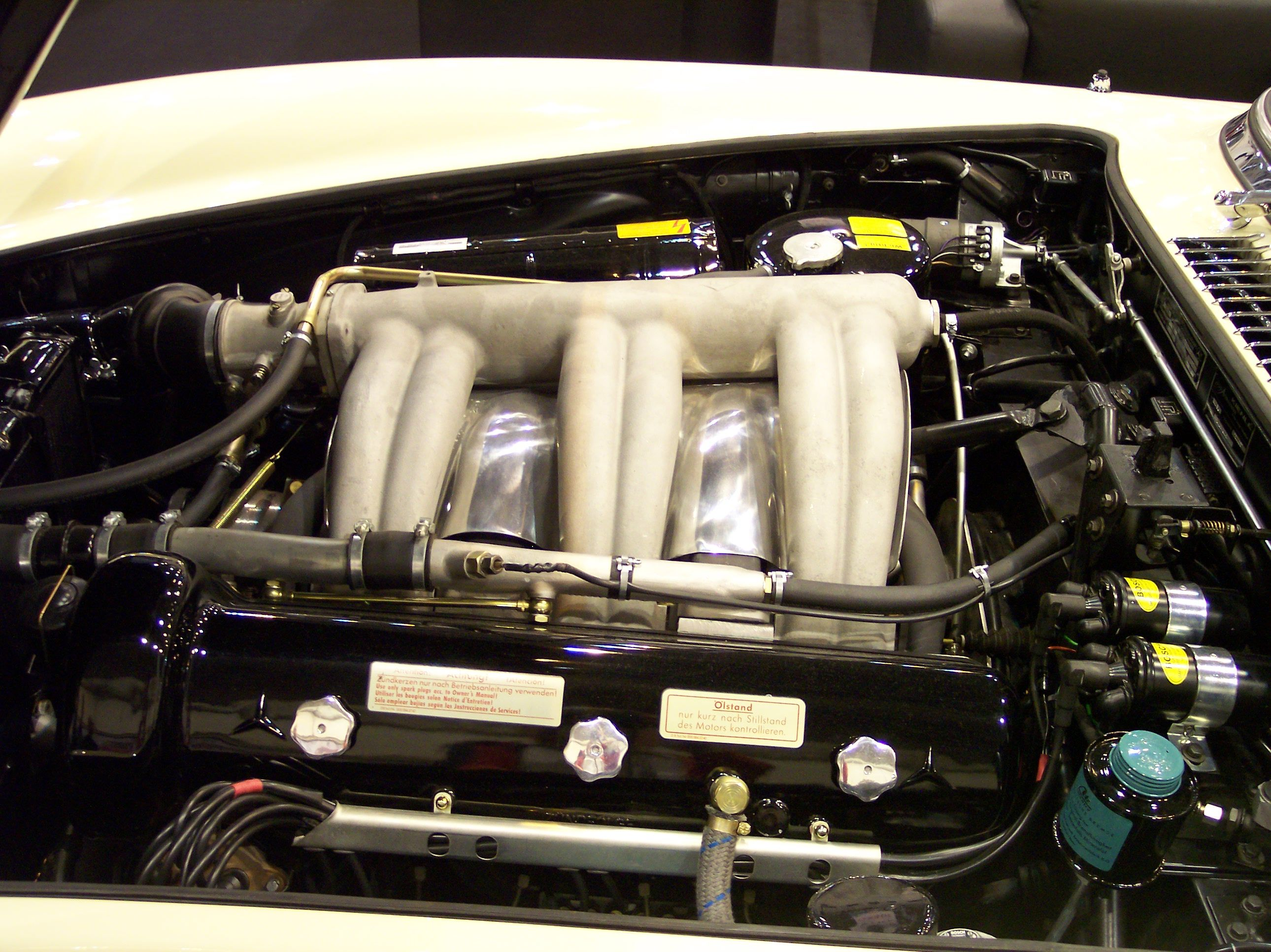
- M198 in a 300SL Roadster

Overview
- Production: 1951–1967

Layout
- Configuration: inline-6
- Displacement: 3.0 L; 182.8 cu in (2,996 cc)
- Cylinder bore: 85 mm (3.35 in)
- Piston stroke: 88 mm (3.46 in)
- Cylinder head material: Aluminum
- Valvetrain: SOHC 2 valves x cyl.

RPM range
- Max. engine speed: 6000

Combustion
- Fuel system: 3 downdraft Solex carburetors Bosch Fuel injection
- Fuel type: Gasoline
- Cooling system: Water-cooled

Output
- Power output: 115–240 bhp (86–179 kW)
- Torque output: 294 N⋅m (217 lb⋅ft) (M198 300 SL)

The Mercedes Benz M186 Engine was a 3.0–litre single overhead camshaft inline-6 developed in the early 1950s to power the company's new flagship 300 "Adenauer" (W186) four-door saloon. It made its debut at the Frankfurt Motor Show in April 1951.

Designed to give reliable service under prolonged hard use, the iron block/aluminum head engine featured deep water jackets, an innovative diagonal head-to-block joint that allowed for oversized intake and exhaust valves, reverse-flow cylinder head, thermostatically controlled oil cooling, copper-lead bearings, and a hardened crankshaft.

Variants of the M186 went on to be used in the exclusive 300 S/300 Sc gran tourer, W194 300SL racer, iconic gullwing 300SL sports car and roadster, and Mercedes top-end 112-series 300SE sedans and limousines, and coupes and cabriolets of the early to mid-1960s. Production ended in 1967, four years after the introduction of the 600 Grosser Mercedes and the 6.3 L (386.4 cu in) M100 V-8.

The various versions of the engine (M186 – M199) produced from 115–240 bhp (86–179 kW) as compression ratios rose and the number of carburetors multiplied or were replaced with fuel-injection.

While sharing many design features with Mercedes' 2.2 L (134 cu in) M180 engine introduced at the same show (such as staggered valve arrangement and rockers running off a single overhead camshaft driven by a duplex cam-chain), the two were of completely different design with little or no inter-changeability of parts.

The term "big six" is sometimes used to distinguish the large block 3.0 L M186 from the small block M180 and its derivatives.

== M186 Variants ==
=== M186 ===
The 3.0–litre (2,996 cc (3.0 L; 182.8 cu in)) M186 was introduced in 1951 for use in the company's flagship 300 "Adenauer" (W186) four-door saloon. It had a slightly under-square bore and stroke of 85 mm × 88 mm (3.35 in × 3.46 in), featured an overhead cam, and an aluminum head with an innovative 30-degree diagonal head-to-block joint that allowed for oversized intake and exhaust valves. Designed to give reliable service under prolonged hard use, the engine featured deep water jackets, thermostatically controlled oil cooling, copper-lead bearings, and a hardened crankshaft. Fitted with twin downdraft Solex carburetors it produced 115 bhp (117 PS; 86 kW) at a 6.4:1 compression ratio.

=== M188 ===
The M188 was introduced in 1952, adding a third downdraft Solex carburetor to the M186; with an increased 7.8:1 compression ratio it produced 150 hp (112 kW) at 5000 rpm, up substantially from the M186's then 110 hp (82 kW). It was only available in the W188 300 S coupé/cabriolet/roadster, through 1955 (when the M199 was introduced for the 300 S's successor, the 300 Sc).

=== M189 ===
The M189 was released in August 1957 for use in the (W189) 300d pillarless limousine, replacing the still underpowered 115 bhp (117 PS; 86 kW) W186 300c's M186 engine's twin Solex carburetors with a Bosch mechanical multi-point fuel injection system. The change substantially upped performance to 180 PS (132 kW; 178 hp) at 5500 rpm.

The engine then appeared in 1961 in the W112 300SE series of sedan, coupe, and cabriolet, as well as its long wheelbase derivative (also called 300SE; the SEL nomenclature would first be used on the subsequent W109 LWB sedans) two years later. From 1964, power output was 170 hp (127 kW). The final incarnation of the M189 was in the W108 300SEb and W109 300SEL of 1965–1967.

=== M194 ===
The M194 engine was developed in for the W194 300SL racer that was successful in 1952, and then retired. Only 10 were made, the first three producing around 170 hp (127 kW), while the remaining seven put out around 180 hp (134 kW). A one-off supercharged "300 SL K" engine was tested at the Nürburgring, when four open-top 300SL raced in a support race at the 1952 German Grand Prix.

Like the W188 used in the ultra-exclusive 300 S coupé/cabriolet, the M194 was outfitted with three two-barrel Solex carburetors. Similar to the M198 used in the production 300SL, the engine is titled 50 degrees to the left in order to reduce the height of the hood. It uses a dry sump lubrication system instead of an oil pan and reservoir. It is also mounted behind the front axle for better weight distribution.

=== M198 ===
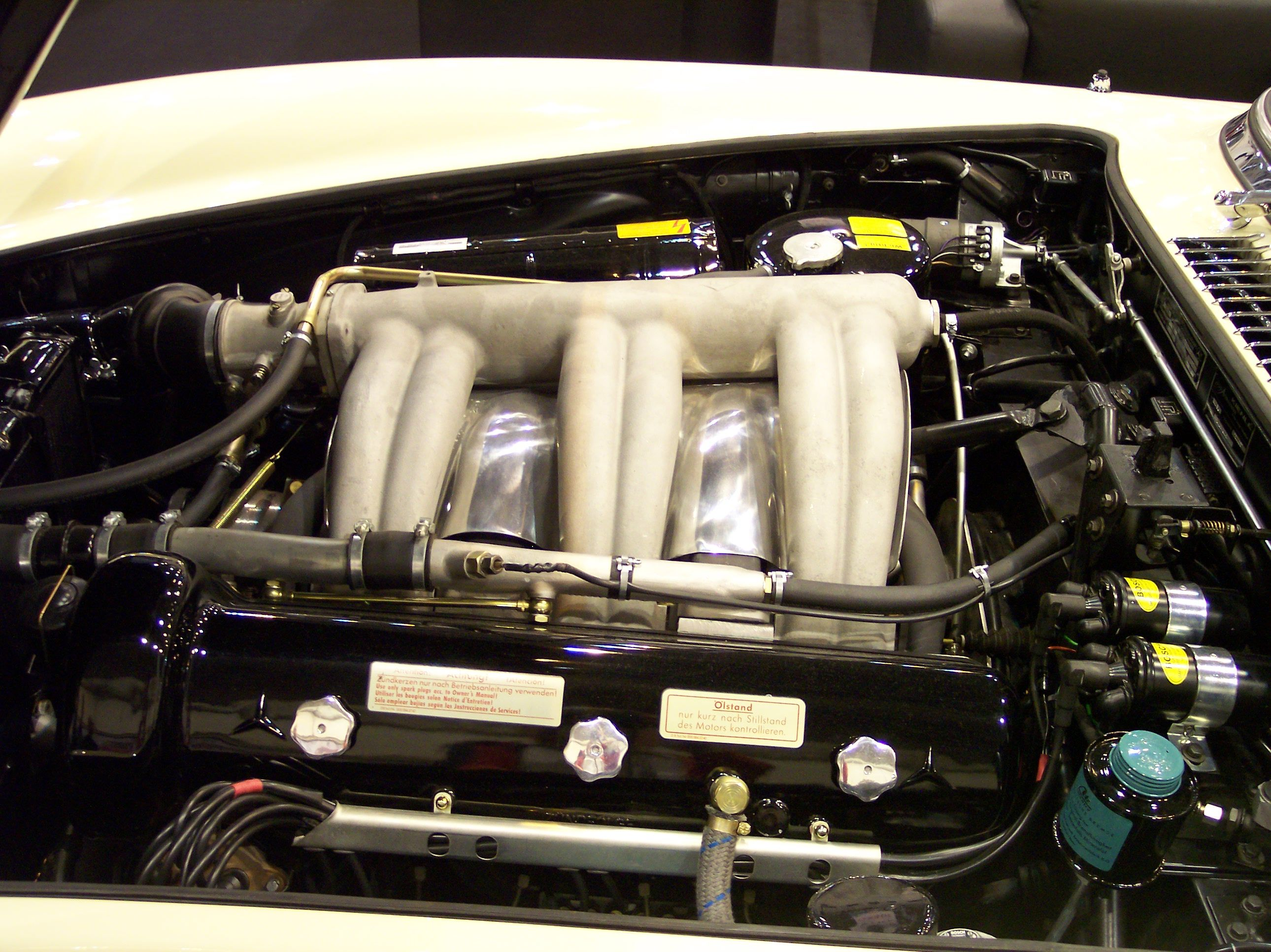
The M198, with its distinctive massive sand-cast aluminum intake manifold

The high-performance, fuel-injected M198 was created in 1954 for the first generation of the 300 SL, known colloquially as the "Gullwing". To fit under its low profile hood the engine was tilted 50-degrees to the left. The result for the car was aerodynamic efficiency, and an enormous sand-cast aluminum intake manifold that stretched across the engine's entire breadth. In order to deliver track-ready performance, race-derived features were built in, including a dry sump lubrication system and Bosch mechanical direct fuel-injection, one of the first production cars with fuel injection.

This engine originally produced 215 PS (158 kW; 212 hp) DIN net at 5,800 rpm and 275 N⋅m (203 lb⋅ft) DIN net of torque at 4,600 rpm and 243 PS (179 kW; 240 hp) net (brake hp) at 6,100 RPM and 294 N⋅m (217 lb⋅ft) net torque at 4,800 RPM. An optional high-performance 240 PS (177 kW; 237 hp) "Sport" camshaft became available, which was the only configuration offered for the Roadster version of the 300 SL when it made its debut in 1957. Production ended in 1964.

=== M199 ===
The M199 was a significantly detuned version of the 300SL's M198 Bosch 6-plunger mechanical direct fuel-injected engine, used only in the 300 Sc between 1955 and 1958. It produced 175 hp (130 kW) at 5400 rpm and 8.55:1 compression ratio, and 188 lb⋅ft (255 N⋅m) at 4300 rpm.

== See also ==
- Mercedes-Benz M180 engine
- List of Mercedes-Benz engines
