= Mercedes-Benz W188 =

Two-door luxury sports tourer produced by Mercedes-Benz (1952–1958)

Mercedes-Benz 300 S/300 Sc
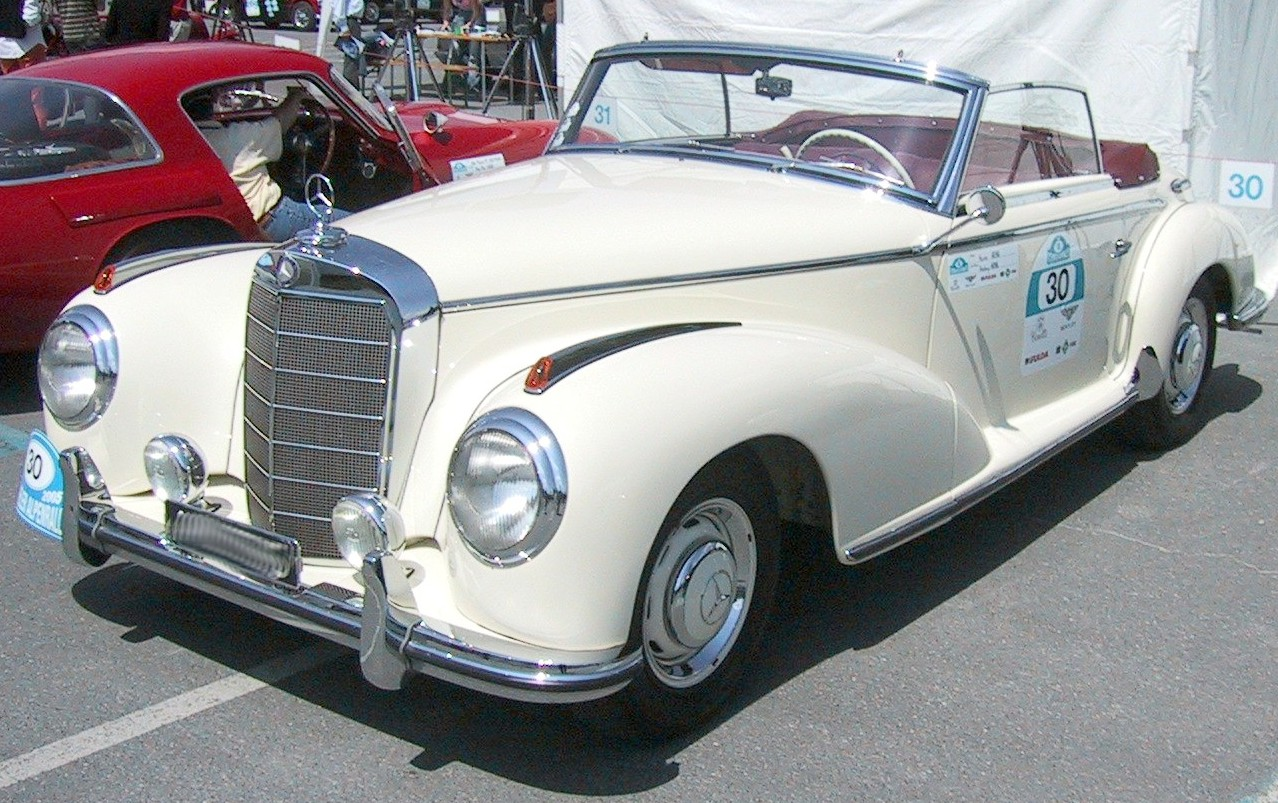
- 1953 Mercedes-Benz 300 S roadster

Overview
- Manufacturer: Mercedes-Benz
- Production: 1952−1958; 300S: 1952-1955; 300 Sc: 1955-1958; W188 Coupé: 314; W188 Cabriolet/Roadster.: 446

Body and chassis
- Class: Two-door luxury car
- Body style: 2 door coupé 2-door cabriolet 2-door roadster
- Layout: FR layout
- Platform: Mercedes-Benz W188
- Related: Mercedes-Benz 300; Mercedes-Benz 300d Mercedes-Benz 300SL

Powertrain
- Engine: 2996 cc M188 I6 (300 S); 2996 cc M199 fuel-injected I6 (300 Sc)
- Transmission: 4-speed manual

Dimensions
- Wheelbase: W188: 2,900 mm (110 in)
- Length: W188: 4,700 mm (190 in)
- Width: W188: 1,916 mm (75.4 in)
- Height: W188: 1,510 mm (59 in)
- Curb weight: W188: 1,670 kg (3,680 lb)

Chronology
- Predecessor: Mercedes-Benz 770
- Successor: Mercedes-Benz W112

The Mercedes-Benz W188 was a two-door luxury sports tourer produced by Mercedes-Benz between 1951 and 1958. The company's most expensive and exclusive automobile, the elegant, hand-built two-door 300 S (1952-1955) and its successor 300 Sc (1955-1958) were the pinnacle of the Mercedes line of their era.

The pair's conservative styling belied their technological advances, sharing numerous design innovations and mechanical components with the iconic Mercedes-Benz 300 SL "Gullwing", including engine, suspension, and chassis.

In addition, it shared other refinements with Mercedes' flagship four-door (W186) 300 "Adenauer" sedan, including a pedal-operated chassis central lubrication system, and a dashboard operated electrical torsion-bar activated rear load-leveling suspension leveling system.

The W188 was available as a hard-topped coupe, a cabriolet, and a roadster (fitted with a lighter, fully retractable soft top without the cabriolet’s heft and large landau bars).

A total of 760 W188s were produced between 1952 and 1958, 560 300S and 200 300 Sc.

== 300 S ==
The 300 S (W188) was introduced at the Paris Salon in October 1951. It was available as a 2-seat roadster, 2+2 coupé, and cabriolet (officially the Cabriolet A). Although mechanically similar to the much larger contemporary four-door (W186) 300 "Adenauer" sedan, the additional craftsmanship, visual elegance, and 50% higher price tag elevated the W188 series to the apex of its era's luxury cars.

The 300 S was fitted with a high-performance M188 version of the W186's 3.0 L (2996 cc/182 in³) overhead cam, aluminum head M186 straight-6, the M188. Designed to give reliable service under prolonged hard use, the engine featured deep water jackets, an innovative diagonal head-to-block joint that allowed for oversized intake and exhaust valves, thermostatically controlled oil cooling, copper-lead bearings, and a hardened crankshaft. Triple Solex carburettors and 7.8:1 compression and raised maximum output to 150 PS (110 kW; 150 hp) at 5000 rpm.

From July 1952 to August 1955, a total of 560 300 S automobiles were built - 216 Coupés, 203 Cabriolet As, and 141 Roadsters were produced.

== 300 Sc ==
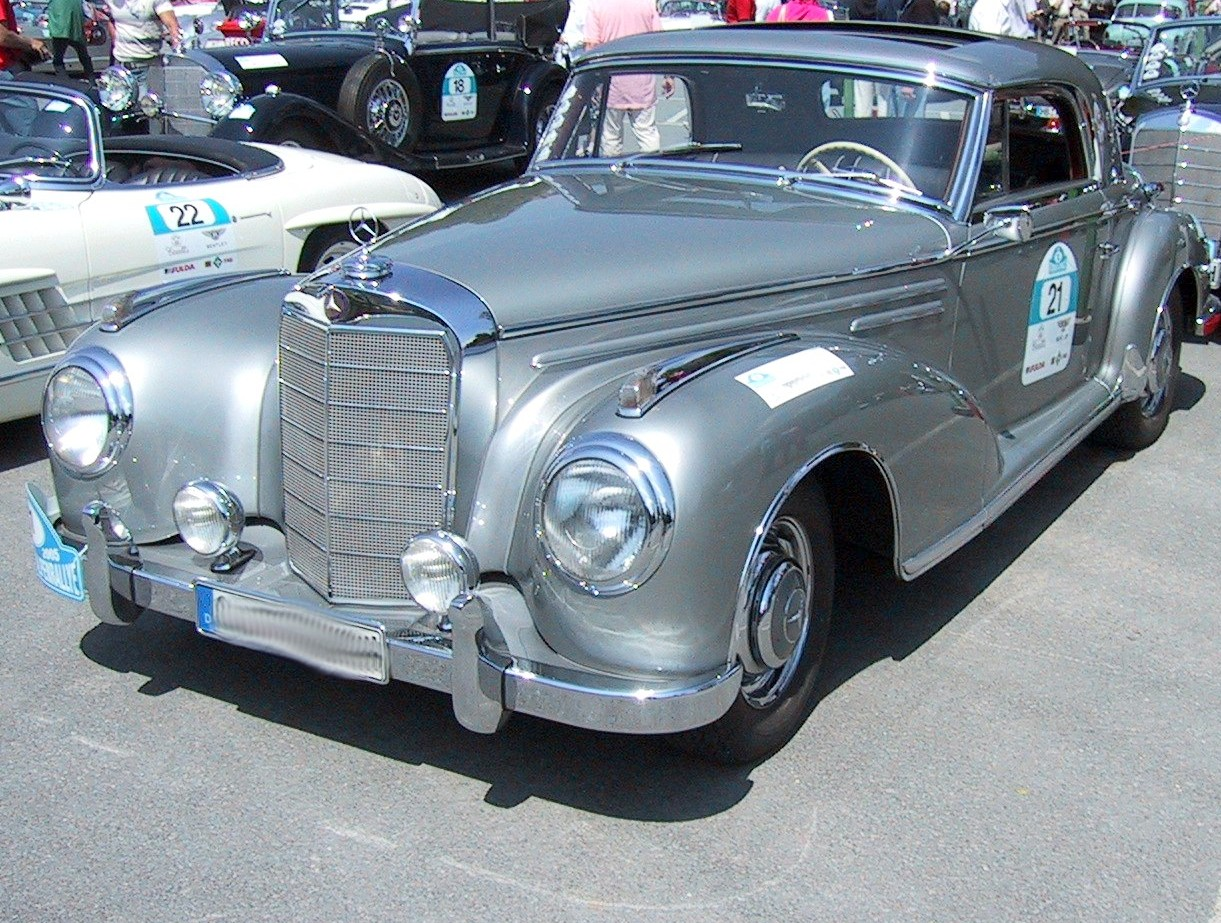
1957 Mercedes-Benz 300Sc coupe

The 300 Sc (W188) appeared in 1955, featuring upgrades to both its engine and suspension derived from the high-performance 300SL Gullwing introduced a year earlier and the (W186) 300c, its most advanced version. These included the Sc's new M199 inline-six receiving a significantly detuned version of the 300 SL's M198 mechanical direct fuel-injection system, and a rear suspension improvement from the 300c.

With an increased 8.55:1 compression ratio, the M199 produced 175 hp (130 kW) at 5400 rpm, and 188 lb⋅ft (255 N⋅m) at 4300 rpm.

Prices rose to DM 36,500, and a total of 200 300 Sc's were built - 98 Coupés, 49 Cabriolet As, and 53 Roadsters through April 1958.
