= Mercedes-Benz W186 =

Motor vehicle

Mercedes-Benz 300
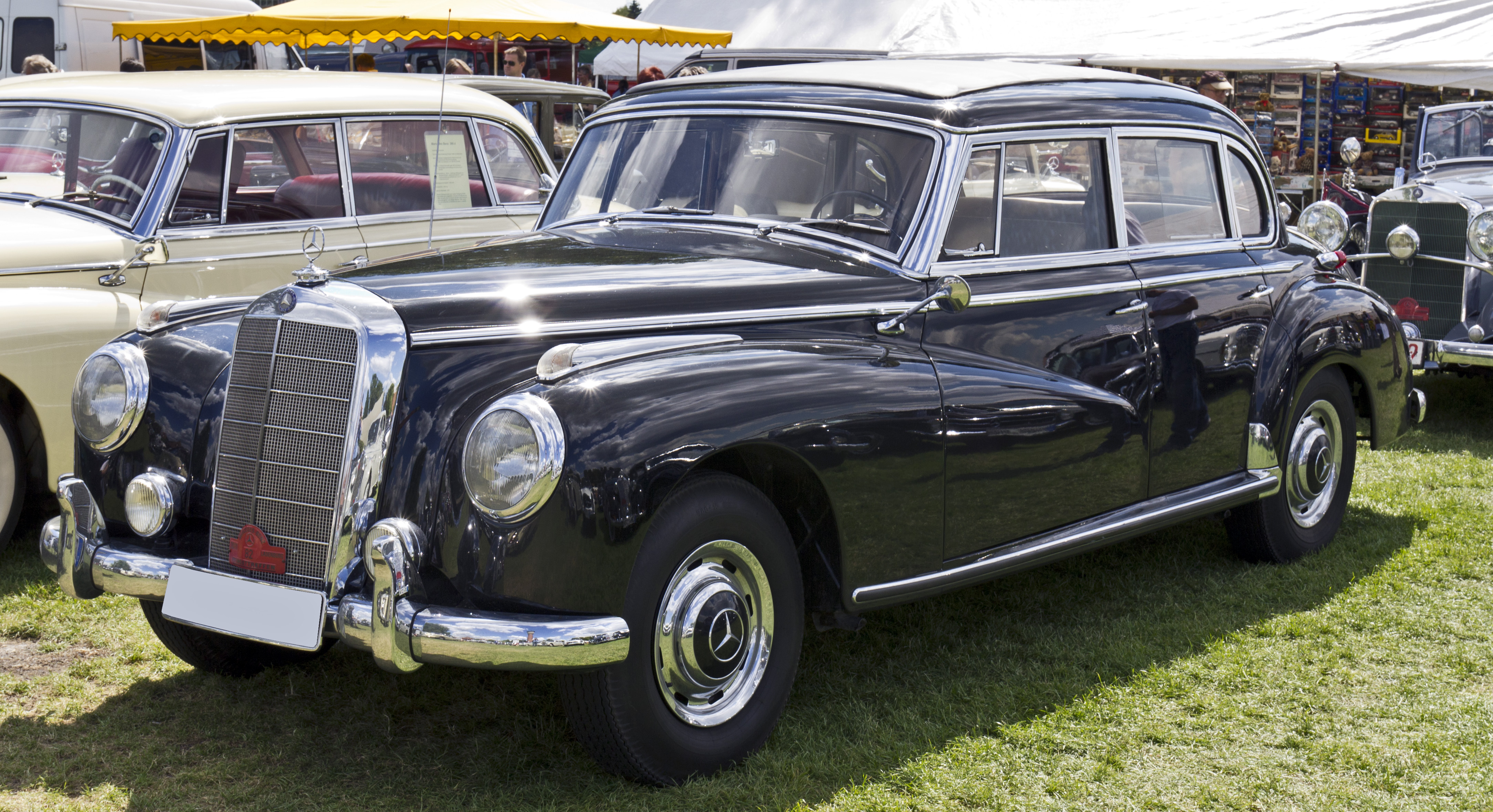
- Mercedes-Benz 300 (W186)

Overview
- Manufacturer: Mercedes-Benz
- Production: 1951–1957; 12,190 built W186 Saloon: 7,646; W186 Cabriolet D: 642

Body and chassis
- Class: Full-size luxury car
- Body style: 4-door saloon 4-door phaeton 4-door cabriolet 4-door limousine
- Layout: FR layout
- Platform: Mercedes-Benz W186
- Doors: 4
- Related: Mercedes-Benz 300 S, Mercedes-Benz 300 SL

Powertrain
- Engine: 2996 cc M186 SOHC I6
- Transmission: 4-speed manual 3-speed automatic

Dimensions
- Wheelbase: W186: 3,050 mm (120.1 in)
- Length: W186: 4,950 mm (194.9 in)
- Width: W186: 1,840 mm (72.4 in)

Chronology
- Predecessor: Mercedes-Benz 770 (wartime)
- Successor: Mercedes-Benz W189

The Mercedes-Benz W186 Model 300 is a four-door luxury sedan produced by Mercedes-Benz between 1951 and 1957. It was the company's flagship model at the time, succeeding the World War II era W150. Three versions were produced in succession, known informally as the 300a (or simply 300), 300b, and 300c. An enlarged "300d" variant built on the W189 chassis succeeded it in late 1957.

Also referred to as a "Type 300", the W186 was equal in features and price but superior in performance to the rival Rolls-Royce Silver Cloud and Bentley S1. Favored by statesmen and business leaders, it offered options such as a glass partition, VHF mobile telephone, and dictation machine.

The W186 is often identified as an Adenauer after Konrad Adenauer, the first Chancellor of the Federal Republic of Germany (West Germany), who employed six custom cabriolet, hardtop saloon, and landaulet versions of the W186 and its successor W189 during his 1949-1963 tenure. Among the custom features in these "parade cars" were writing desks, sirens, curtains, dividing partitions, sunroofs, and half-roof "landaulet" configurations.

Technologically advanced, the 300 was regarded as a "driver's" car, sharing numerous design innovations and mechanical components with the iconic Mercedes-Benz 300 SL "Gullwing", including engine, suspension, and chassis.

== Models ==
=== 300 ===
The four-door 300 (W186) was introduced at the Frankfurt Motor Show in April 1951 and entered series production in November 1951. It had no "a" designation, which was informally added, along with the "b" and "c", by later enthusiasts seeking to distinguish the three W186 generations.

Available as both a saloon and cabriolet, it featured graceful modernist bodywork atop Mercedes' proven X-frame chassis. An all new 3.0 L (2996 cc/182 in³) overhead cam, aluminum head M186 straight-6 was coupled to a 4-speed all-synchromesh manual gearbox. Twin downdraft Solex carburetors and an innovative diagonal head-to-block joint that allowed for oversized intake and exhaust valves produced 115 PS (85 kW; 113 hp) at a 6.4:1 compression ratio.

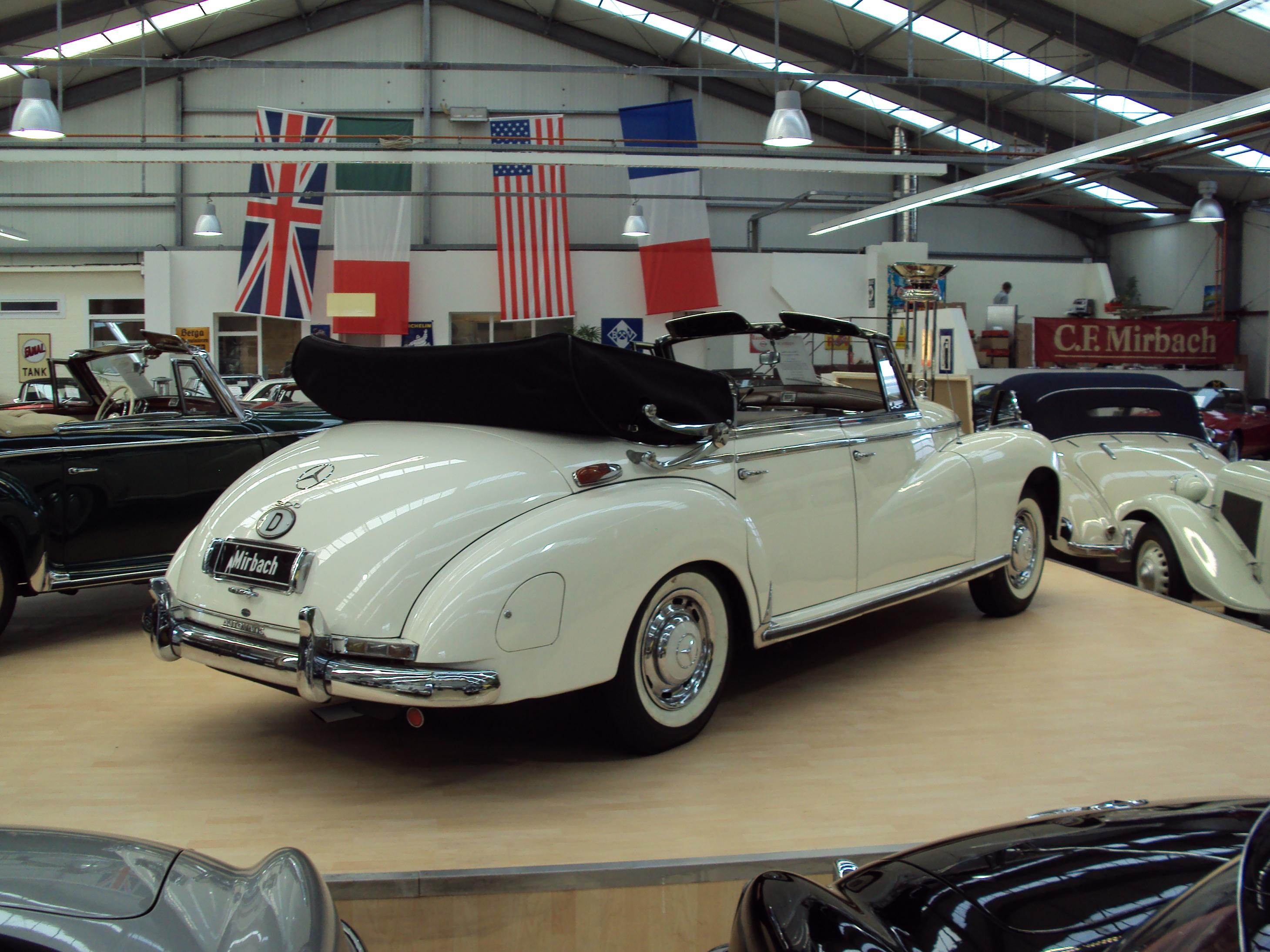
The W186 cabriolet displays the series' streamlined rear lines

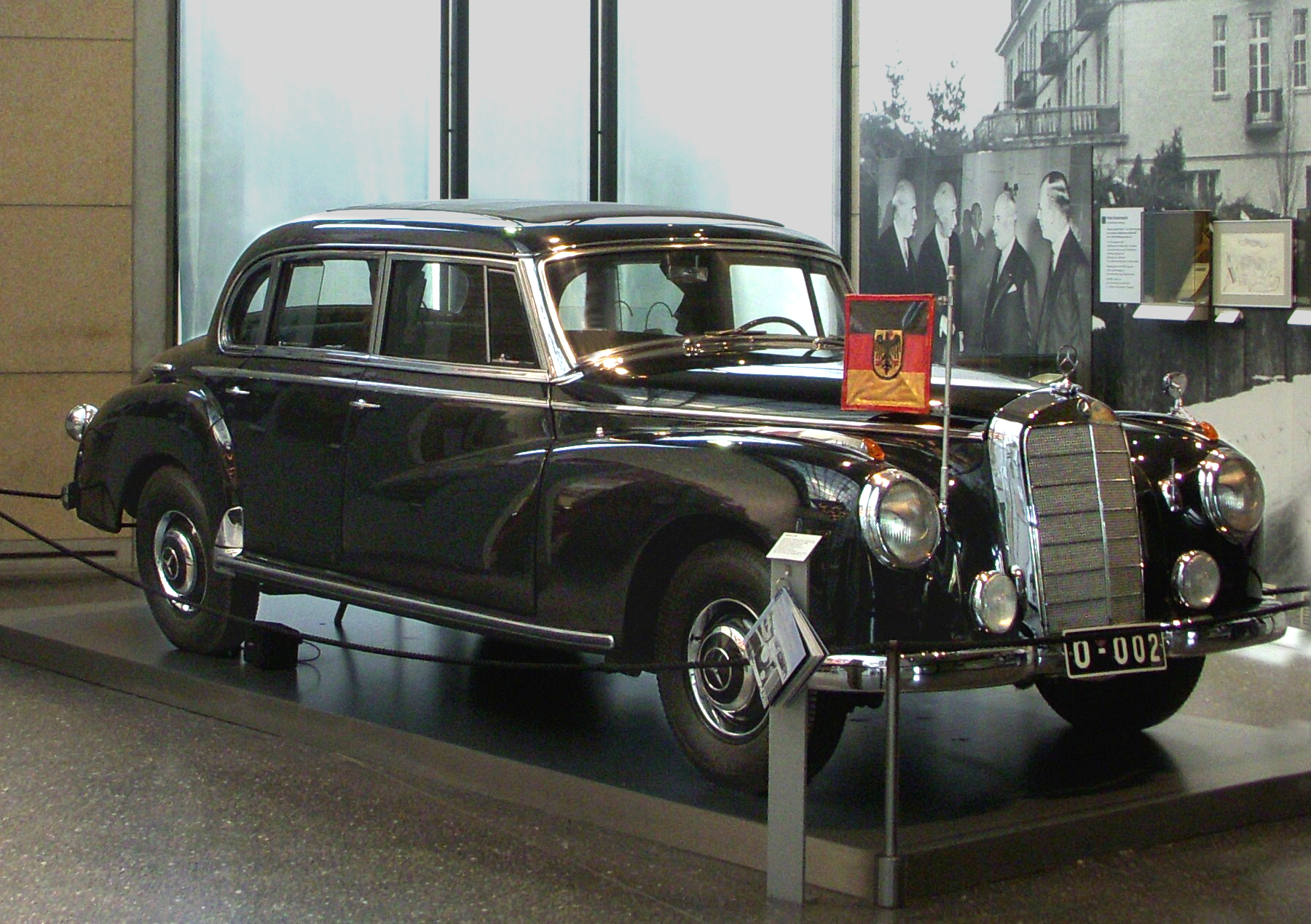
W186 used by Konrad Adenauer in Bonn

Designed to give reliable service under prolonged hard use, the engine featured deep water jackets, thermostatically controlled oil cooling, copper-lead bearings and a hardened crankshaft. With no natural cruising speed, the car could sustain anything up to its maximum speed all day, road conditions permitting.

The combination of a rigid X-shaped ovoid steel tube frame and four-wheel independent suspension provided surprisingly nimble handling. Double wishbones, coil springs, and a stabilizer bar were used up front and Mercedes' typical double coil spring swing axle in rear. An innovative dashboard-operated rear load-leveling suspension engaged a torsion bar to increase stiffness by one-third when needed, and a pedal-operated central lubrication system kept friction points silent. Brakes were hydraulic drum all around, steering worm-and-sector, replaced in 1952 by recirculating ball.

A total of 6,214 saloons and 591 Cabriolet Ds, retroactively referred to as the "300a" series, were produced through September, 1955, including a brief 300b run incorporating elements of the 300c's partial facelift prior to its debut.

=== 300b ===
The 300b (W186) was introduced in March 1954, adding vacuum assisted power brakes and front door vent windows. Engine power was upped to 125 PS (92 kW; 123 hp) via different Solex carburetors and an increased compression ratio of 7.5:1.

=== 300c ===
The 300c (W186) made its debut in September, 1955, adding a larger rear window and optional 3-speed Borg-Warner automatic transmission. It was priced at $10,864 in the United States (DM 22,000 on the home market), with the convertible almost a third more at $14,231 (DM 24,700).

A special long-wheelbase model, called the 300 c long wheelbase with a 10 cm (3.94 in.) longer wheelbase was produced from May 1956 to July 1957, priced at DM 25,000 with the manual transmission and DM 26,500 with automatic transmission. A total of 62 units of the 300 c long wheelbase were produced.

A total of 1,432 300c saloons were produced through July, 1957. Only 51 300c series Cabriolet D's were built through June 1956, when the model was dropped.

== Successor ==
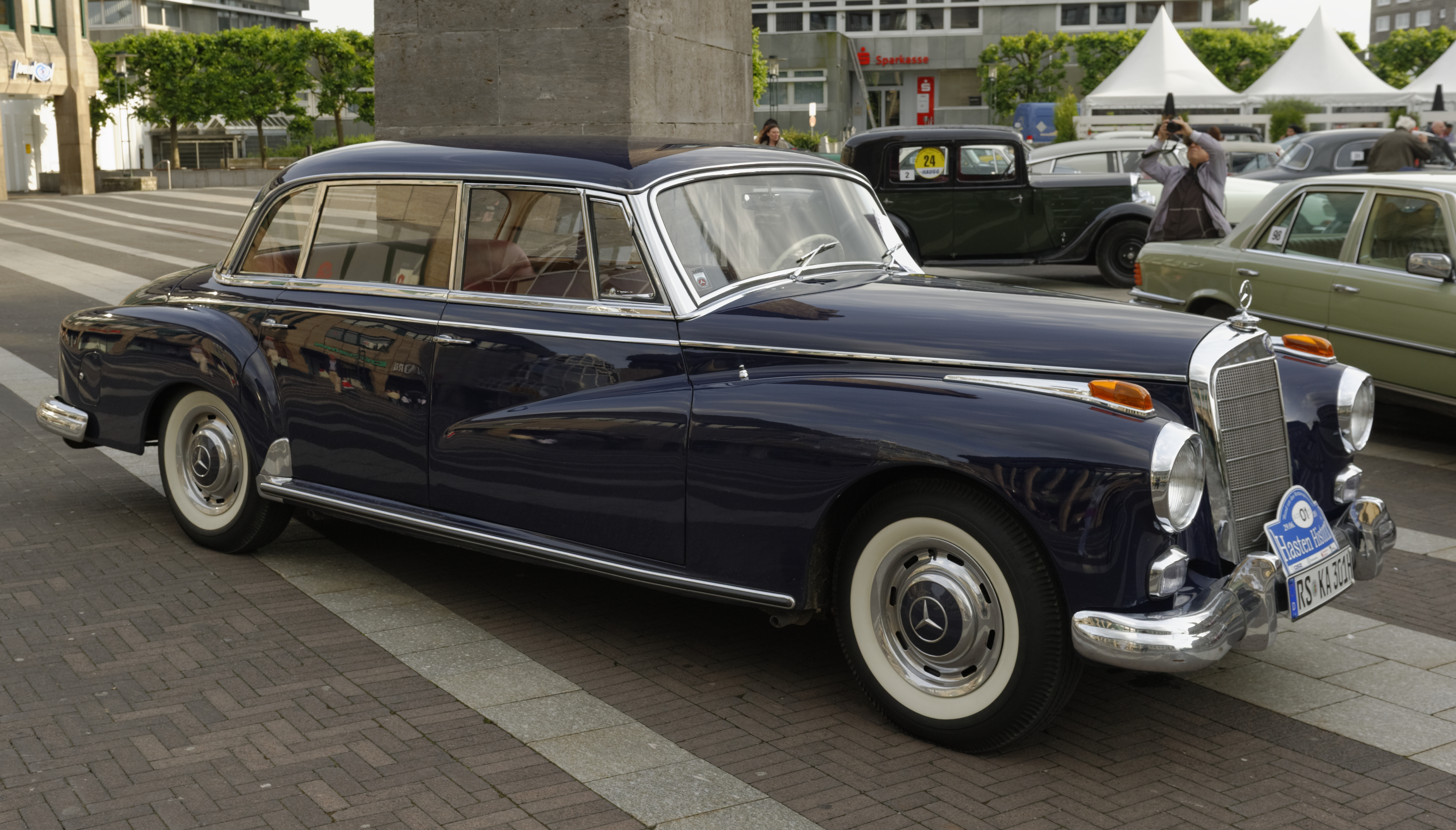
The limousine-length Mercedes-Benz 300d (W189) was introduced in 1957

=== 300d (W189) ===
The 300c was succeeded by a limousine-length "300d" (W189) in 1957. It featured sweeping changes that included revised bodywork, fuel injection, and unique hardtop configuration transforming it into a pillarless phaeton.

== See also ==
- Mercedes-Benz 300 S
