= Mercedes-Benz W189 =

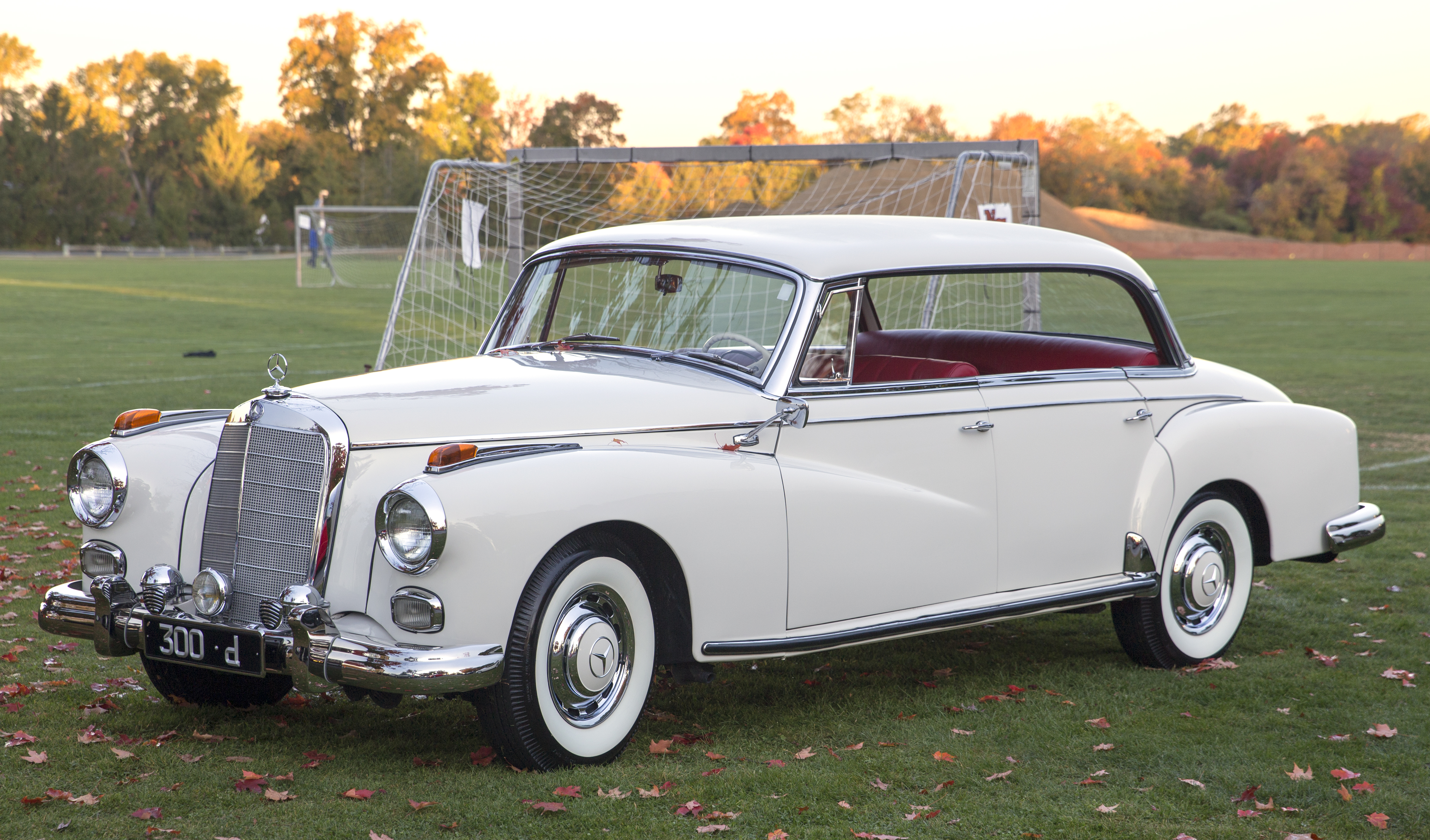

Overview
- Manufacturer: Mercedes-Benz
- Also called: Mercedes-Benz 300d
- Production: 1957–1962; W189 Saloon: 3,077; W189 Cabriolet D: 65

Body and chassis
- Class: Full-size luxury car
- Body style: 4-door saloon 4-door phaeton 4-door cabriolet 4-door limousine
- Layout: FR layout
- Platform: Mercedes-Benz W189
- Related: Mercedes-Benz 300 Sc, Mercedes-Benz 300 SL

Powertrain
- Engine: 2996 cc M189 I6
- Transmission: 4-speed manual 3-speed automatic

Dimensions
- Wheelbase: W189: 3,150 mm (124.0 in)
- Length: W189: 5,190 mm (204.3 in)
- Width: W189: 1,860 mm (73.2 in)
- Height: W189: 1,620 mm (63.8 in)
- Curb weight: W189: 1,950 kg (4,299 lb)

Chronology
- Predecessor: Mercedes-Benz W186
- Successor: Mercedes-Benz W112; Mercedes-Benz 600

See Mercedes-Benz S-Class for a complete overview of all S-Class models.

The Mercedes-Benz W189 model 300 was a four-door luxury tourer produced by Mercedes-Benz between 1957 and 1962. It was the company's flagship model at the time, equivalent to the modern S-Class and Maybach.

Marketed as the Type 300d, it was equal in features and price but superior in performance to the rival Rolls-Royce Silver Cloud. Favored by statesmen and business leaders, it offered options such as a glass partition, VHF mobile telephone, and dictation machine.

All but hand-built, the 300d is often colloquially referred to as the Adenauer, after Konrad Adenauer, the first Chancellor of Germany (then West Germany) who employed six custom cabriolet, hardtop saloon, and landaulet versions of the W189 and its precursor W186 series during his tenure. Among the custom features in these "parade cars" were writing desks, sirens, curtains, dividing partitions, sunroofs, and half-roof "landaulet" configurations.

Technologically advanced, the fuel injected 3.0 L inline-6 300d was regarded as a "driver's" car, sharing numerous design innovations and mechanical components with the iconic Mercedes-Benz 300 SL "Gullwing", including engine, suspension, and chassis. It was succeeded by the W100 Mercedes-Benz 600 Großer Mercedes in 1963.

== 300d ==
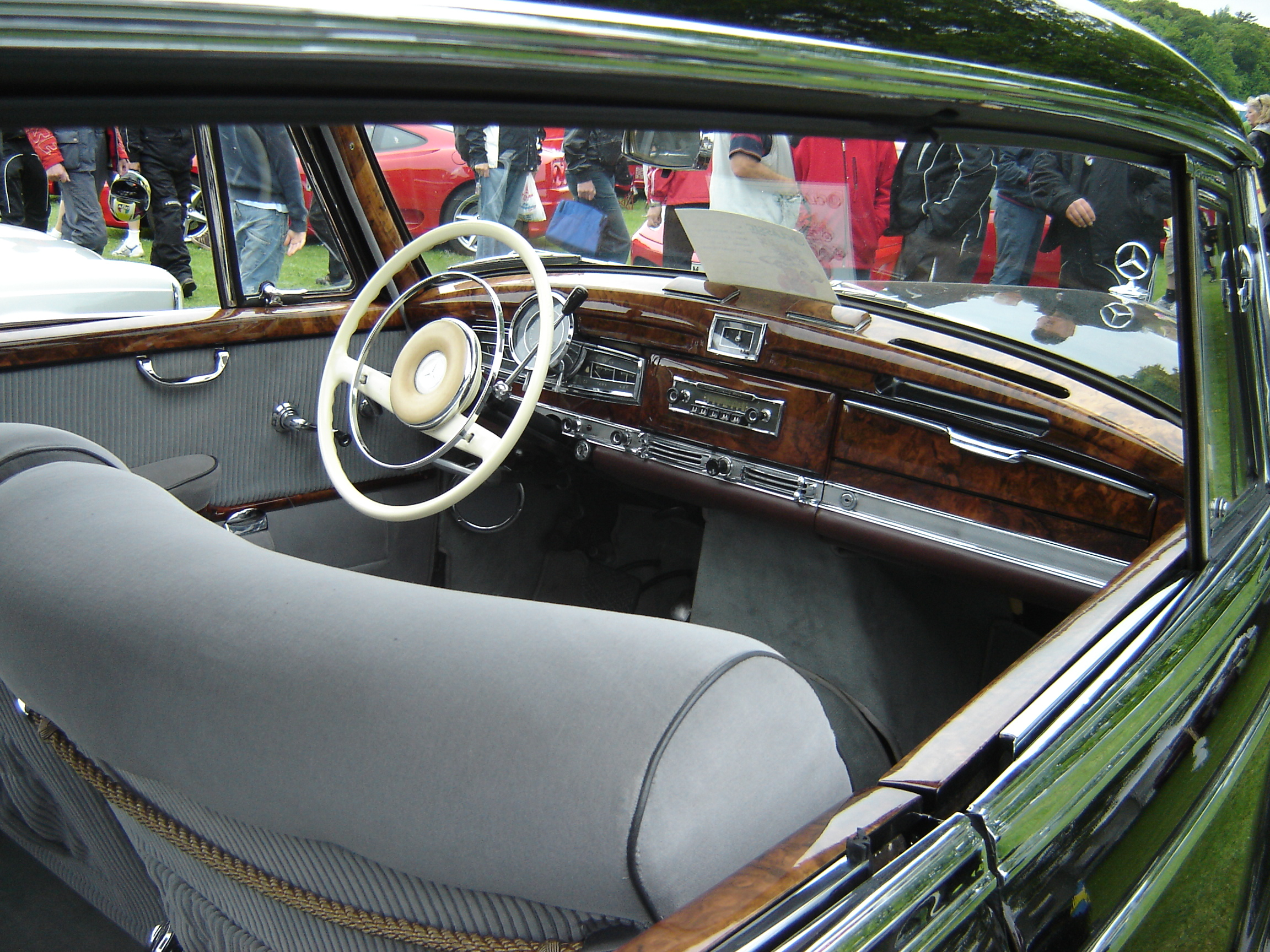
Mercedes-Benz 300d interior

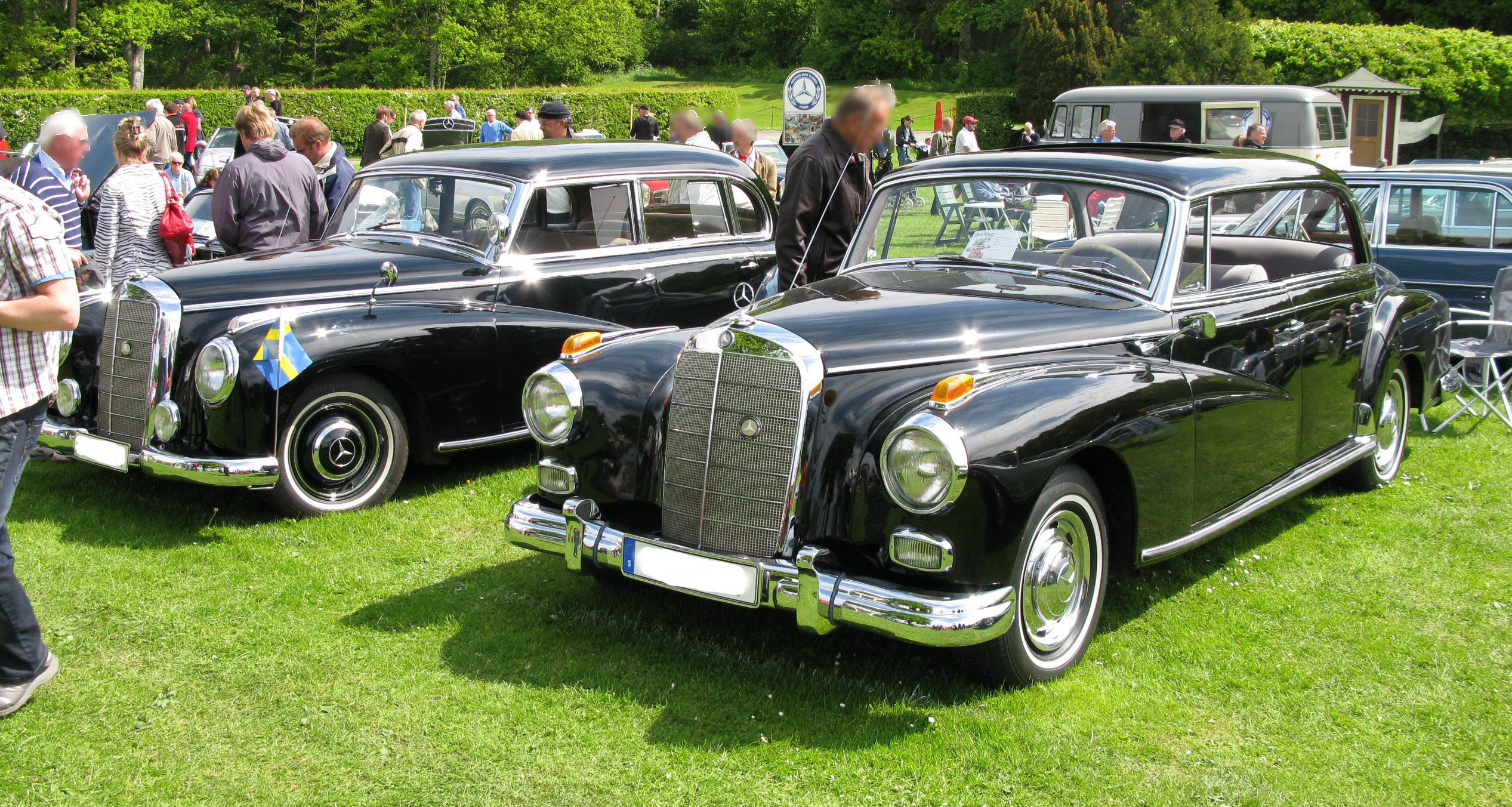
A 1952 W186 (left) and 1962 W189 (right), with its rear quarter light removed, demonstrating the pillarless phaeton configuration employed in the model's popular "parade car" role.

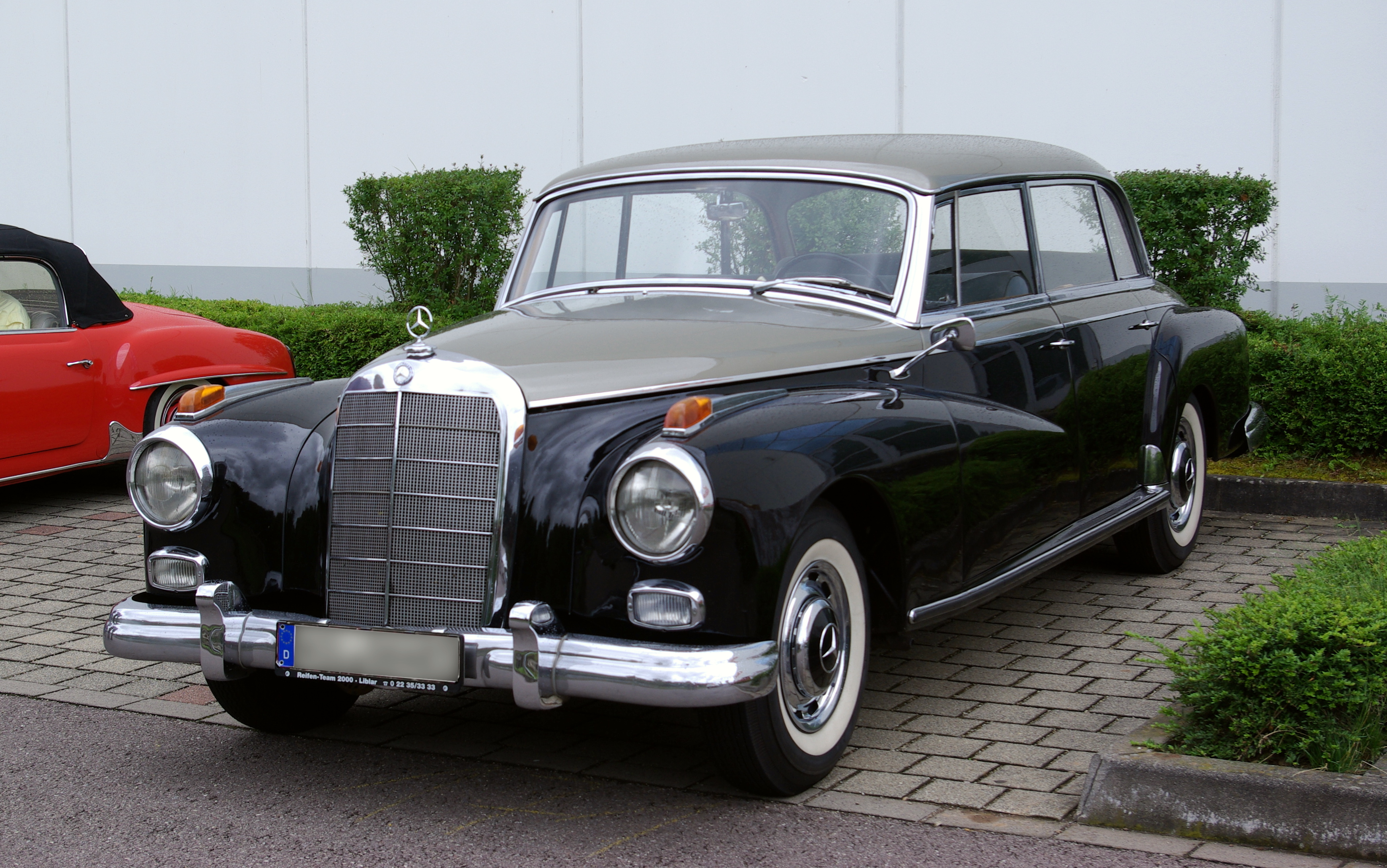
The limousine-length Mercedes-Benz 300d was introduced in 1957. A lengthened wheelbase and new bodywork added 4" of rear seat leg room over the 300c.

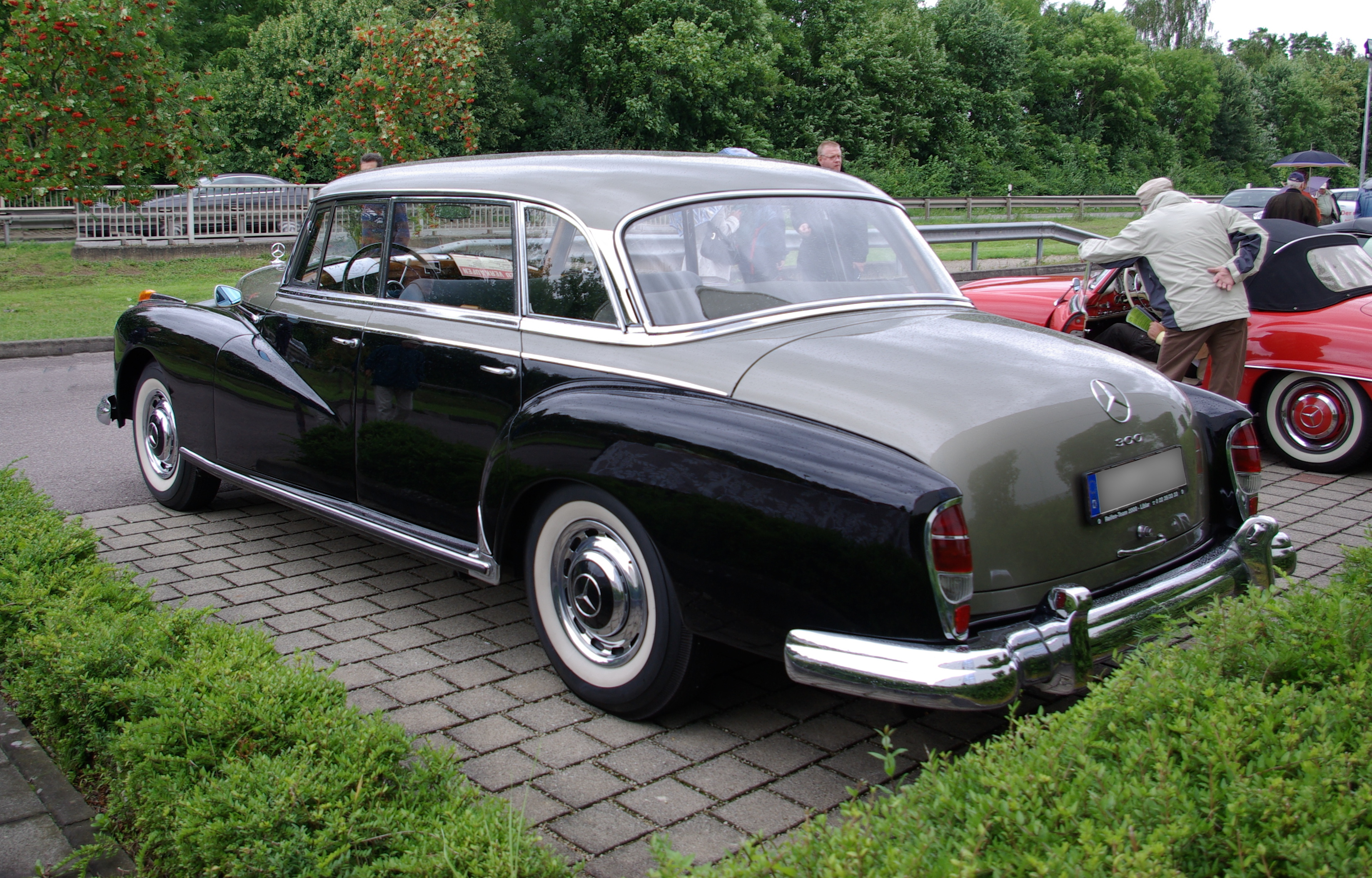
1959 300d rear

A successor to Mercedes' flagship W186 series final model, the 300c, the enlarged 300d (W189) was introduced in August 1957. Its new chassis code reflected sweeping refinements that included modernized bodywork, pioneering fuel injection, and a unique hardtop configuration transforming it into a pillarless phaeton.

Available as both a saloon and cabriolet, it retained the W186's proven X-frame chassis and was fitted with a more powerful version of its 3.0 L (2996 cc/182 in³) overhead cam, aluminum head M186 straight-6, the M189.

The M189 shared improvements proven in the iconic 300SL "Gull Wing", the fastest production car of its day, including Bosch mechanical direct injection and an innovative diagonal head-to-block joint that allowed for oversized intake and exhaust valves. Output was an even horsepower per cubic inch, 180 PS (132 kW; 178 hp) at 5500 rpm.

Designed to give reliable service under prolonged hard use, the engine featured deep water jackets, thermostatically controlled oil cooling, copper-lead bearings and a hardened crankshaft. A 3-speed Borg-Warner automatic transmission was standard. With no natural cruising speed, the car could sustain anything up to its maximum speed all day, road conditions permitting.

The combination of a rigid X-shaped ovoid steel tube frame and four-wheel independent suspension provided surprisingly nimble handling. Double wishbones, coil springs, and a stabilizer bar were used up front, and Mercedes' typical double coil spring swing axle in rear. An innovative dashboard-operated rear load-leveling suspension engaged a torsion bar to increase stiffness by one-third when needed, and a pedal-operated central lubrication system kept friction points silent. Brakes were vacuum-assisted hydraulic drum all around, steering recirculating ball. Power steering and Artic-Kar air-conditioning were new options.

An additional 4 inches of wheelbase provided greater rear legroom, equaling that of the long wheelbase model Rolls-Royce Silver Cloud also introduced that year. Removable rear quarter lights allowed an unobstructed view in and out from the front vent window on back, much valued in the model's popular role as a "parade car".

In addition to the saloon and cabriolet, three special "Pullman" variants were produced, with the wheelbase (and length) extended a further 450 mm - one was a standard limousine and the other two were landaulets. One of the landaulets was the Popemobile - it had its rear seat replaced with one custom armchair and was presented to Pope John XXIII in December 1960. The other landaulet and the limousine remained in Mercedes-Benz's ownership and were rented out to the government.

A total of 3,077 300d sedans (priced at DM 27,000) were produced through March 1962, along with 65 special-order Cabriolet Ds (DM 35,500). After some overlap with the smaller, more contemporary styled W112 chassied 300SE "Fintail" sedan that shared its engine, the 300d limousine was ultimately replaced as company flagship by the 600 Großer Mercedes in 1963.

== See also ==
- Mercedes-Benz 300 Sc
