= Mercedes-Benz 190 =

Mercedes-Benz has sold a number of automobiles with the "190" model name:

- 1955–1963 W121
  - 1955–1963 Mercedes-Benz 190SL
  - 1956–1959 190
  - 1958–1959 190D
  - 1959–1961 190b
  - 1959–1961 190Db
- 1962–1965 W110
  - 1962–1965 190c
  - 1962–1965 190Dc
- 1984–1993 W201
  - 1984–1986 190D 2.2
  - 1984–1993 190E 2.3
  - 1986–1987 190E 2.3-16
  - 1987 190D 2.5 Turbo
  - 1987–1991 190D 2.5
  - 1987–1993 190E 2.6
