= 190 =

190 may refer to:

- AD 190
- 190 (number), the natural number following 189 and preceding 191
- U.S. Route 190, also known as the Ronald Reagan Memorial Highway, is an east–west United States highway in Louisiana and Texas
- Mercedes-Benz 190 (disambiguation)
- Interstate 190 (Massachusetts), runs for 19.26 miles (31.00 km) north from I-290 in Worcester, Massachusetts to Route 2 in Leominster, Massachusetts
- Interstate 190 (New York), runs 28.34 miles (45.61 km) from I-90 near Buffalo, New York to Lewiston, New York via Niagara Falls
- Interstate 190 (Illinois), Illinois Tollway system
- Interstate 190 (South Dakota), an auxiliary Interstate Highway in the U.S. state of South Dakota
- Connecticut Route 190, a state route in the northern part of the U.S. state of Connecticut
- Missouri Route 190, Supplemental
- Georgia State Route 190, Former
- PowerBook 190, laptop computers manufactured by Apple Computer as part of their PowerBook brand, introduced to the market in August 1995
- 190 BC, a year of the pre-Julian Roman calendar
- No. 190 Squadron RAF, a Royal Air Force squadron with a relative short existence, but a very broad career. It served as a trainer squadron during the first World War and as convoy escort, airborne support and transport squadron during World War II
- Mexican Federal Highway 190 (Fed 190), a free (libre) part of the federal highways corridors (los corredores carreteros federales) of Mexico
- 190 (New Jersey bus)

== See also ==
- 190th (disambiguation)
