= Dongfeng CA71 =

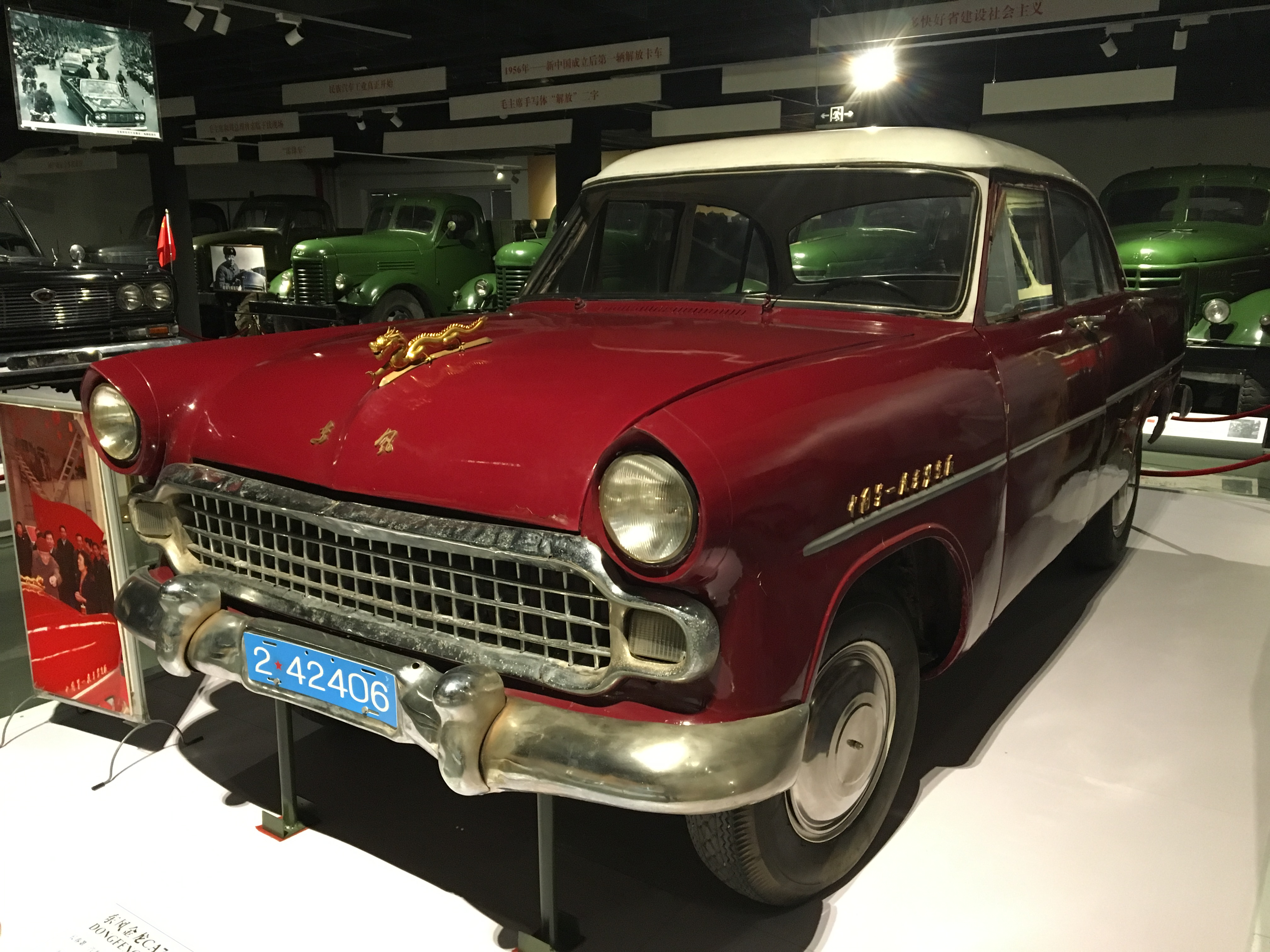
- A CA71 on display at the Beijing Classic Car Museum.

Overview
- Manufacturer: First Automotive Works (FAW)
- Production: 1958–1961
- Assembly: China: Changchun

Body and chassis
- Class: Mid-size luxury car (D)
- Body style: 4-door sedan
- Layout: FR layout
- Related: Mercedes-Benz W121; Simca Vedette

Powertrain
- Engine: 1930 cc I4
- Transmission: 3-speed manual

Dimensions
- Wheelbase: 2,700 mm (106.3 in)
- Length: 4,560 mm (179.5 in)
- Width: 1,755 mm (69.1 in)
- Height: 1,530 mm (60.2 in)

Chronology
- Successor: Hongqi CA7200

The Dongfeng CA71 (simplified Chinese: 东风CA71; traditional Chinese: 東風CA71) is a medium-size luxury car made by the Chinese automobile manufacturer First Automotive Works (FAW) and produced in small numbers in 1958. It was the first passenger car to be produced entirely in China.

== History of development ==
The Dongfeng CA71 was developed by FAW in Changchun (Manchuria). FAW was founded in 1953 with technical and financial support from the Soviet Union. It primarily produced commercial vehicles, especially heavy trucks based on the Soviet model. In 1958 China launched the Great Leap Forward Campaign, which was aimed at catching up with the Western industrialized countries.

From 1958, several Chinese plants, including FAW, began to design passenger cars for civilian use.

The Dongfeng CA71 was used for a number of propaganda campaigns and some included Mao Zedong. About 20-30 Dongfeng CA71s were produced, although some of the production run are rumored to be simply rebadged Vedettes rather than fully FAW-built cars. Because the CA71 was small, the Hongqi CA72 was the preferred state limousines. Middle officials tended to use the smaller Fenghuang (Shanghai SH760).

== Design ==
The Dongfeng CA71 was modeled on two foreign vehicles. The chassis was reverse engineered from the Mercedes-Benz W121 as was its 1.9 litre, inline four-cylinder M121 engine, albeit with a slightly longer stroke. The body was based on the French Simca Vedette, although its actual shape is closer to the similar sized Ford Zephyr Mk2 of the same era. This was possibly due to Ford's relationship with Simca at the time. At least one car appears to have been fitted with the 4-cylinder 2.1 liter engine of the GAZ-M20 Pobeda.

Chinese detailing included a golden dragon motif on the bonnet grille, and elements of a Chinese lantern design on the taillights, like the Hongqi CA72. The engine is stated to have produced 52 kW (71 PS; 70 hp) while the top speed was 130 km/h (81 mph).

FAW's Deputy Design Director, Shi Qihe, and Chief Engineer, Hu Tongxun directed the project.

== Production ==
The first prototype of the Dongfeng CA71 was completed on 12 May 1958. Various test drives followed in the summer. Several more copies were built in 1958. The car was hand made with the sheet metal being hand-braided. Only two examples are known to still exist: one is kept at the Hongqi Factory Museum in Changchun and one is located in the Luo Wenyou Classic Car Museum in Beijing, although possibly a Simca-based replica instead of an original: a third replica was completed in 2023 by FAW.

As Hongqi would then focus on the larger Hongqi CA72 and Hongqi CA770 limousines, a mid-size four-door sedan was not again developed until the 1990s, with the Hongqi-badged Audi 100 sedans.
