= Mercedes-Benz 200 =

Mercedes-Benz has sold a number of automobiles with the "200" model name:

Mercedes-Benz 200 may refer to:

- 1965–1968 W110
- 1965–1967 200D
- 1965–1968 200
- 1968–1976 W115
  - 200D/8
- 1976–1985 W123
- 1984–1992 W124, 1984–1995/96 version of the E-Class
