= 190th Division =

190th Division may refer to:

- 190th Division (2nd Formation) (People's Republic of China)
- 190th Infantry Division (Wehrmacht), Germany
- 190th Rifle Division, Soviet Union

== See also ==
- List of military divisions by number
- 190th Regiment (disambiguation)
- 190th (disambiguation)
