= M136 (disambiguation) =

M136 or M-136 may refer to:

- M-136 (Michigan highway), a state highway in Michigan
- Mercedes-Benz M136 engine
- AT4, Swedish anti-tank weapon designated as M136 AT4 in the U.S.
