= Mercedes-Benz W120/W121 =

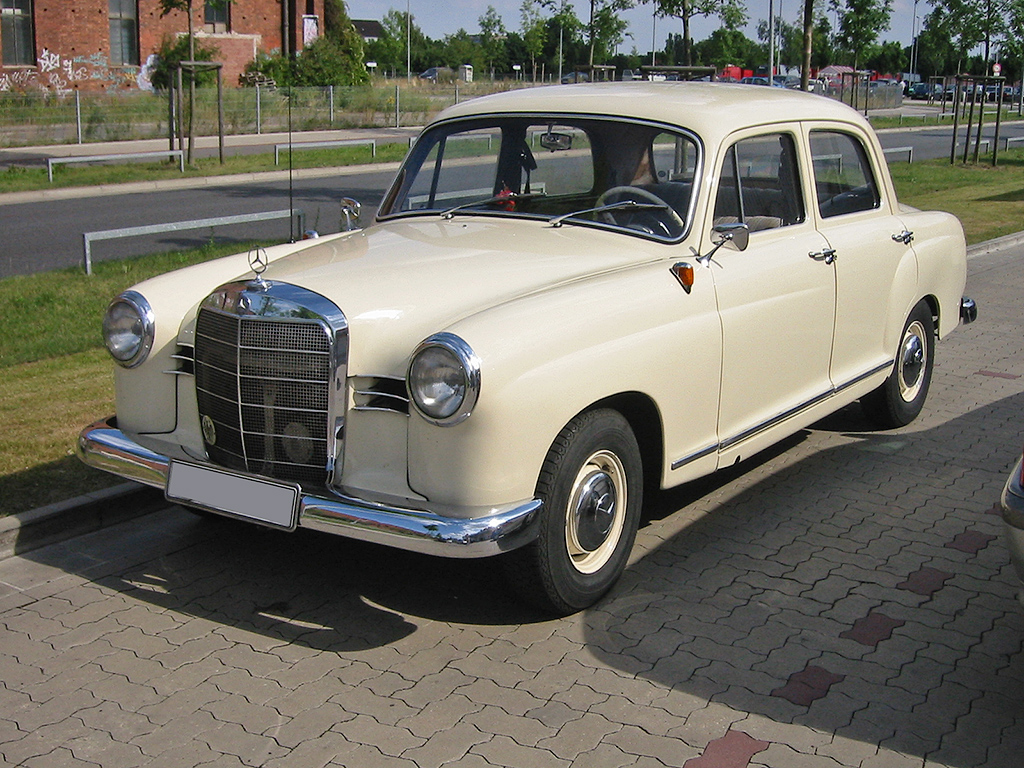
- Mercedes-Benz 180b (W120)

Overview
- Manufacturer: Daimler-Benz
- Production: 1953–1962; 442,963 built
- Assembly: Germany: Sindelfingen; Australia: Port Melbourne; South Africa: East London
- Designer: Karl Wilfert

Body and chassis
- Class: Executive car (E)
- Body style: 4-door sedan
- Layout: FR layout
- Related: Mercedes-Benz W105 — 219; Mercedes-Benz W180 — 220a/S; Mercedes-Benz W128 — 220SE; Dongfeng CA71

Dimensions
- Wheelbase: 2,650 mm (104.3 in)
- Length: 180: 4,460 mm (175.6 in); 180 a / 190: 4,485 mm (176.6 in); 180 b/c, 190 b: 4,500 mm (177.2 in)
- Width: 1,740 mm (68.5 in)
- Height: 1,560 mm (61.4 in)
- Curb weight: 1,150 kg (2,540 lb)—1,220 kg (2,690 lb)

Chronology
- Predecessor: Mercedes-Benz W136; Mercedes-Benz W191
- Successor: Mercedes-Benz W110

The Mercedes-Benz W120 and Mercedes-Benz W121 are technically similar inline-four cylinder sedans of slightly different engine displacements made as two model series by Mercedes-Benz, the 180 and 190:

- the W120 was introduced as the 180 in 1953, powered by the company's existing 1.8 liter M136 engine. From 1954, the W120 was also offered with a diesel engine as the Mercedes-Benz 180 D. Both versions were sold through 1962
- the W121 debuted as the 190 in 1956, powered by a 1.9 liter M121 engine,. From 1958, it was also offered with the OM621 diesel, sold as the 190 D. Both versions were sold through 1961.

Each model's diesel version received engine upgrades during its run.

Together with the longer wheelbase and more luxurious 2.2-liter inline-six cylinder W105 219 W180 220 and W128 220SE models, they constituted 80 percent of Mercedes-Benz' car production between 1953 and 1959. The W121 190/190D were replaced by the Mercedes-Benz W110 190c/190Dc in 1961.

The W120 was the first predecessor to the medium size Mercedes-Benz E-Class sedan line.

== History ==
The base, four-cylinder 180/190 and the W105 six-cylinder 219 Ponton models looked very similar in appearance, from the rear doors forward, to the more luxury W128 and W180 stretched wheelbase six-cylinder 220a and 220 S(E) models. From behind, one could not easily differentiate even the top-of-the-line 220SE (E for 'Einspritzung', or fuel injection) from a base 180 model, but the longer bonnet (and wheelbase), and chrome touches identified it as an upscale, six-cylinder model.

The 1951 to 1957 Mercedes-Benz 300 W186 Adenauer company flagship was a much larger car, with its own frame, body, interior, and engine. It was followed through 1962 by an updated limousine length Mercedes-Benz 300d W189.

The W120/W121 shared their Ponton nickname with other Mercedes models, drawn from their ponton styling, a prominent design and styling trend regarded as resembling a pontoon that unified a car's previously articulated hood, body, fenders and running boards into a singular envelope.

The 180 and 190 four-cylinders were widely used as German taxis. Only these shorter Pontons featured low-wattage parking clearance lights at front bumper top rear. As in other Mercedes models, a simple toggle switch above the driver's left knee selected which side would illuminate, so as not to needlessly run down the battery, no small concern when restarting diesels in winter. Heater air intakes were on both sides of the radiator grille only on the W120/W121.

The form and body of the car changed little during its production run. However, in 1957, a year after the introduction of the 190 saloon, the 180's 56 PS (41 kW; 55 hp) M136 engine, which had originally been designed for the Mercedes-Benz 170 Sb, was replaced with a downtuned version of the 190's M 121. The same year, the Mercedes star atop the faux external radiator cap was made spring-loaded to give when bumped: reports at the time indicated that this was either to pander to the requirements of certain export markets, notably Switzerland, or to reduce the risk of pedestrian injury in the event of an accident. By 1959, the star was spring-retained on a ball base.

A related two-door luxury roadster variant, the W121 B II 190SL, was produced from 1955 to 1963.

At the 1959 Frankfurt Motor Show, in time for the 1960 US model year, a slightly wider grille and slimmer taillights were introduced. The same wider grille was carried forward to the car's more flamboyantly styled W110 "Fintail" successors, during 1961.

At the time, Studebaker-Packard had an agreement with Mercedes-Benz to distribute their cars in the US market. A prototype was built based on the W120 with Packard-styled headlights similar to those fitted on the Packard Patrician. This prototype was called the W122 but it never reached the production state; This was likely because the W120 platform that the prototype was based on was reaching the end of its life cycle, while the compact luxury sector was not that developed in the US market yet.

== Technical description ==
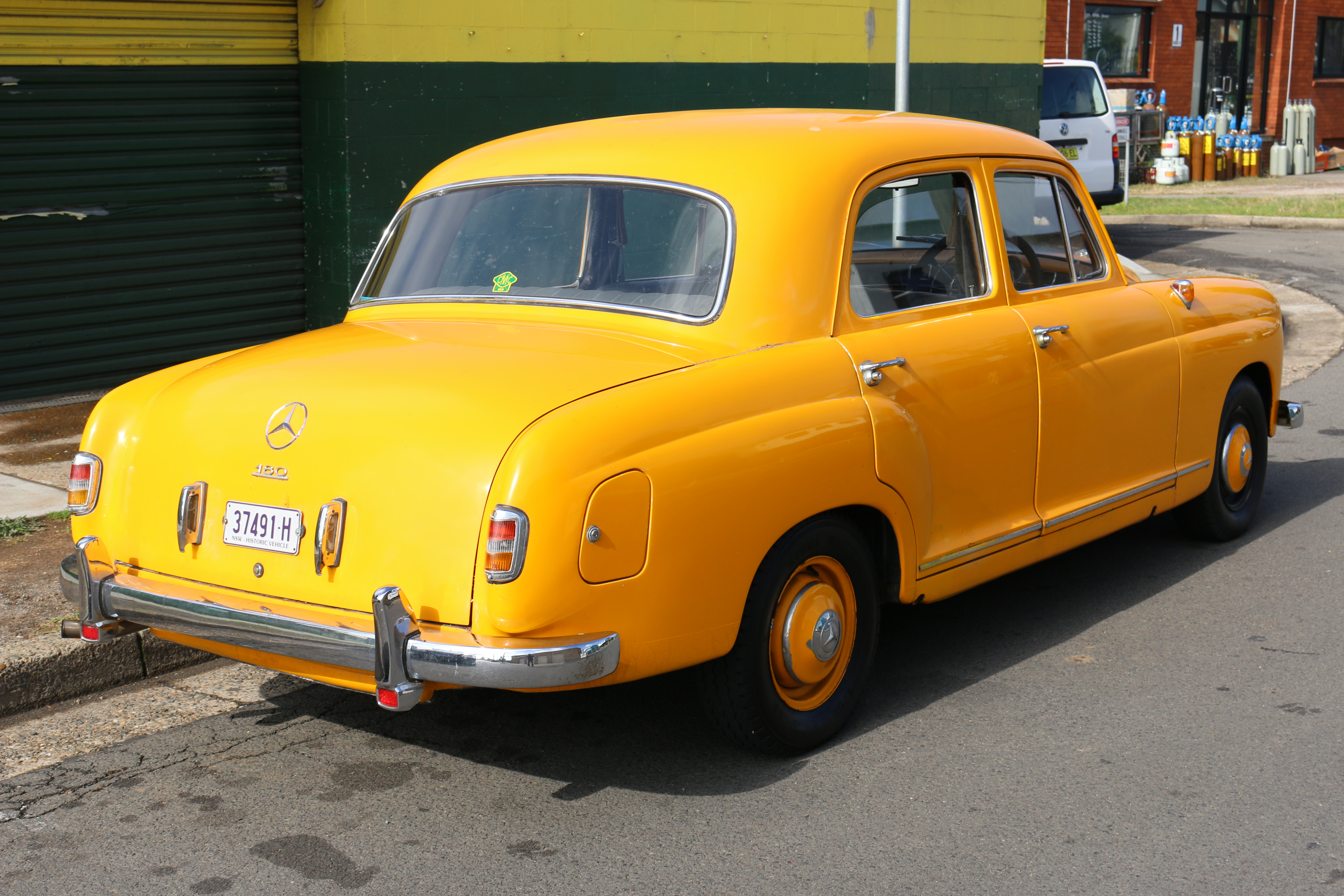
Mercedes-Benz 180 (W120)

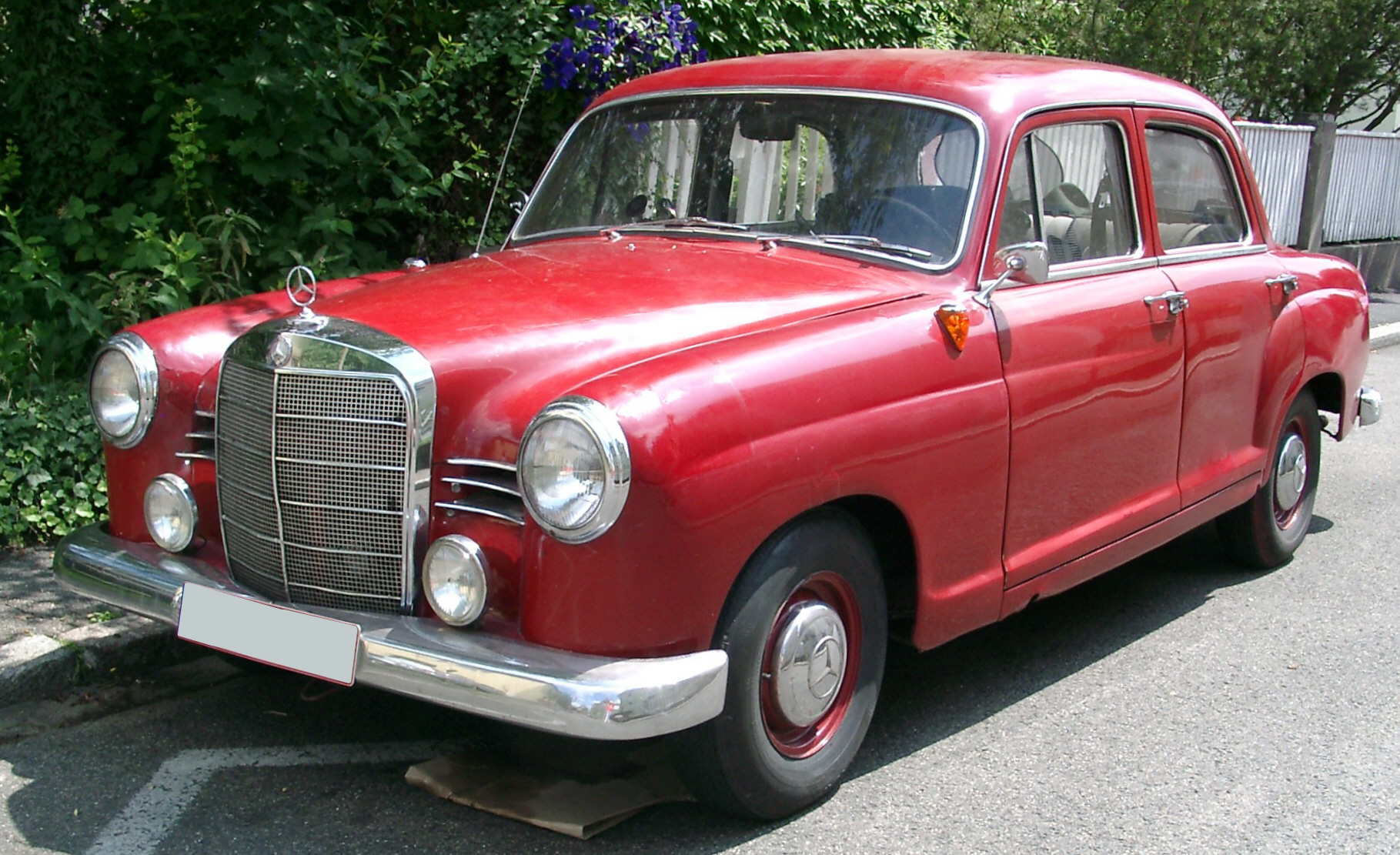
For the 1960 model year the car received a wider grille

The Mercedes-Benz W120 and W121 are four-door saloons with a longitudinal front engine, and rear-wheel drive. Rolling chassis with either two or four doors were also available from the factory. The cars have a self-supporting body, the so-called "Ponton" body. The wheelbase measures 2650 mm, which is slightly less than the larger "Ponton" saloons' 2750 mm. In front, the W 120 and W 121 have independent double-wishbone suspension, in rear, they have either a double-joint swing axle (until September 1955), or a single-joint swing axle (from September 1955). Both front and rear wheels are coil-sprung; the front axle is fitted with a torsion-type anti-sway bar, and the rear wheels have additional hydraulic shock absorbers. Daimler-Benz installed a recirculating ball steering system and a hydraulic drum braking system in the 120- and 121-series.

Mercedes-Benz built the W120 with all of their then-present four-cylinder engines: the M136 and M121 petrol engines, and the OM636 and OM621 diesels, with most W120 and W121 cars powered by either of the Diesel engines. The torque is sent from the engine to the rear wheels through a dry single-disc clutch and a synchronised, four-speed constant-mesh gearbox. The shift lever is a rather small lever mounted on the steering column.

== Models ==
Model	Chassis code	Years	Type	Engine	Number built
W120 sedan	W120.010	1953–1957	180	1.8 L M136 petrol I4	52,186
W120 sedan	W120.010	1957–1959	180a	1.9 L M121 petrol I4	27,353
W120 sedan	W120.010	1959–1961	180b	1.9 L M121 petrol I4	29,415
W120 sedan	W120.010	1961–1962	180c	1.9 L M121 petrol I4	9,280
W120 sedan	W120.110	1953–1959	180D	1.8 L OM636 diesel I4	116,485
W120 sedan	W120.110	1959–1961	180Db	1.8 L OM636 diesel I4	24,676
W120 sedan	W120.110	1961–1962	180Dc	2.0 L OM 621 diesel I4	11,822
W121 sedan	W121.010	1956–1959	190	1.9 L M121 petrol I4	61,345
W121 sedan	W121.010	1959–1961	190b	1.9 L M121 petrol I4	28,463
W121 sedan	W121.110	1958–1959	190D	1.9 L OM621 diesel I4	20,629
W121 sedan	W121.110	1959–1961	190Db	1.9 L OM 621 diesel I4	61,309
