= 190th Regiment =

190th Regiment may refer to:

- 190th Field Regiment, Royal Artillery
- 190th Pennsylvania Infantry Regiment, a Union Army regiment during the American Civil War

== See also ==
- 190th (disambiguation)
