= Mercedes-Benz 190 SL =

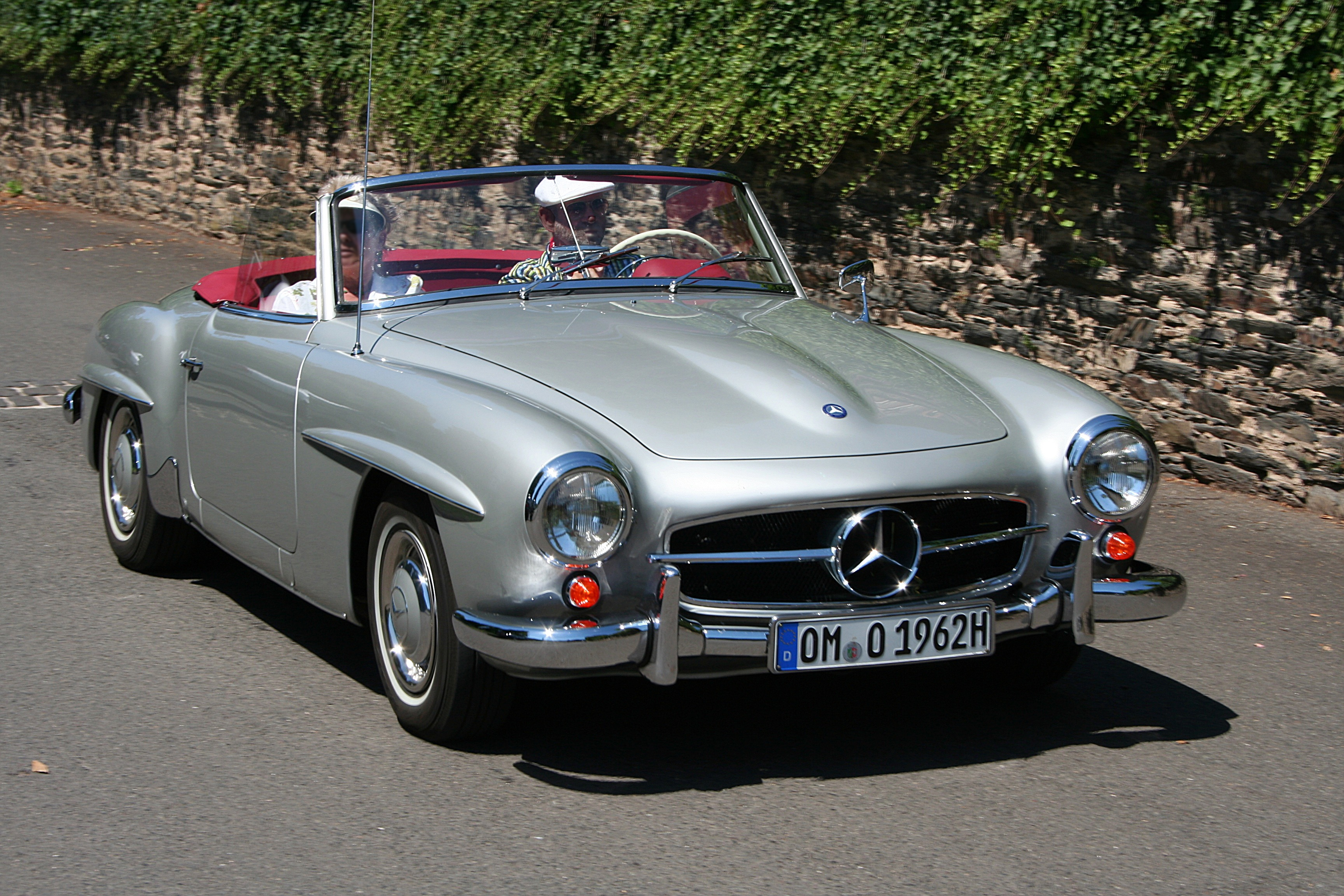

Overview
- Manufacturer: Daimler-Benz
- Production: 1955–1963; 25,881 built
- Assembly: West Germany: Stuttgart; Untertürkheim
- Designer: Karl Wilfert, Walter Häcker

Body and chassis
- Class: Sports car / Grand tourer
- Body style: roadster
- Layout: FR layout
- Platform: Mercedes-Benz W121
- Related: Mercedes-Benz W198 (300 SL); Mercedes-Benz W120/121

Powertrain
- Engine: 1,897 cc M121 SOHC I4
- Transmission: 4-speed manual, fully synchronized

Dimensions
- Wheelbase: 2,400 mm (94.5 in)
- Length: 4,290 mm (168.9 in)
- Width: 1,740 mm (68.5 in)
- Height: 1,320 mm (52.0 in)
- Curb weight: 2,552 lb (1,158 kg)

Chronology
- Successor: Mercedes-Benz W113 (230SL)

See Mercedes-Benz SL-Class for a complete overview of all SL-Class models.

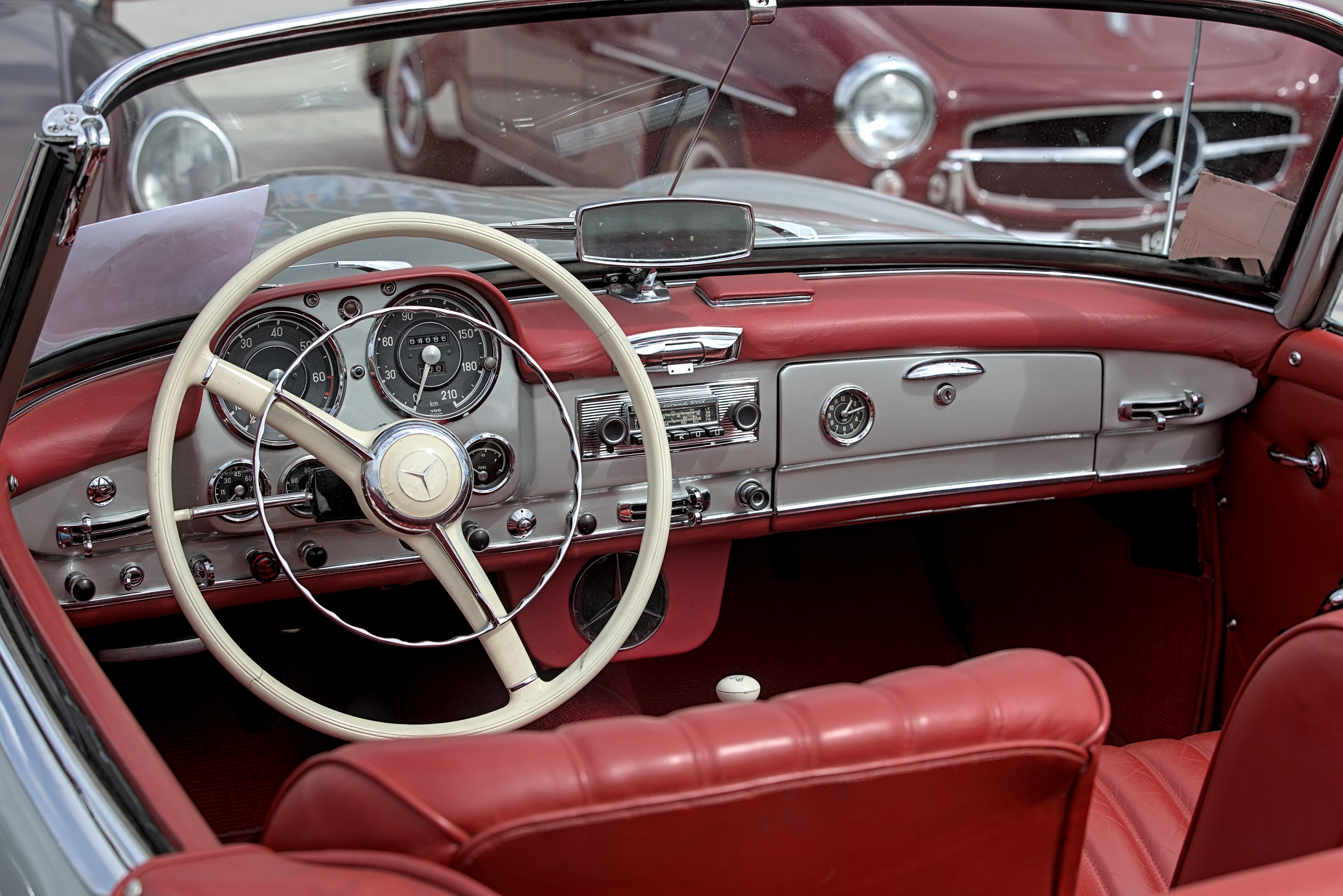
Interior

The Mercedes-Benz 190 SL (W121) is a two-door luxury roadster produced by Mercedes-Benz between May 1955 and February 1963. Internally referred to as W121 (BII), it was first shown in prototype at the 1954 New York Auto Show, and was available with an optional removable hardtop.

== Design ==
The 190 SL presented an attractive, more affordable alternative to the exclusive Mercedes-Benz 300 SL, sharing its basic styling, engineering, detailing, and fully independent suspension. Both cars had double wishbones in front and swing axles at the rear. Instead of the 300 SL's expensive purpose-built W198 tubular spaceframe, the 190 SL's structure used a shortened unitary floorpan modified from the W121 base saloon.

The 190 SL was powered by a new, slightly oversquare 105 PS (77 kW; 104 hp) Type M121 BII 1.9 L straight-four SOHC engine. Based on the 300 SL's straight six, it had an unchanged 85 mm bore and 4.3 mm reduced 83.6 mm stroke, was fitted with twin-choke dual Solex carburetors, and produced gross 120 hp (89 kW; 122 PS). In detuned form, it was later used in the W120 180 and W121 190 models.

The car was available either as a soft-top convertible (initially priced at DM 16,500/US$3,998) or with removable hardtop (DM 17,650/$4,295). A small third-passenger transverse seat was optional. During its first years the 190 SL was available as a sports-racing model with small perspex windscreen and spartan one-piece leather covered bucket seats and aluminium doors. In 1959, the hardtop's rear window was enlarged.

The performance of 190SL left to be desired, with its top speed of around 170 km/h (105 mph) and 0-100 acceleration time of roughly 14 seconds, especially as Porsche based across town in Zuffenhausen would soon come out with the updated A-model of its 356, which in the 1600S trim, had a 87 hp (65 kW; 88 PS) engine, 30 hp weaker than the 190SL but offset by its mere 850 kg (1,874 lb) weight, thus making it equal in performance to 190SL, at DM 3,000 cheaper price. Therefore, Rudolf Uhlenhaut envisioned a six-cylinder engine for the car. In 1956, a few six-cylinder prototypes were built for testing. A 190SL with a unique engine, using the 300SL block, squeezed into the engine bay with a one-off mix of Benz-bin parts was entered in the 1956 Alpine Rally, but the costs of production would be prohibitive. Two other prototypes, fitted with fuel injected M180 220SE engines were baptised the W127 / 220SL. In June 1956, Rudi Uhlenhaut and Karl Kling lapped the Nürburgring Nordschleife circuit in the two W127s 25 seconds faster than a regular 190SL. On 12 April 1957, MB's board decided to build the W127, six-cylinder 220SL alongside the 190SL, but production challenges postponed manufacturing until it was overtaken by the Mercedes-Benz 230SL 'Pagoda'.

Both the 190 SL and the 300 SL were replaced by the 230SL in 1963.

== Super-Leicht or Sport-Leicht ==
Mercedes-Benz did not announce what the abbreviation "SL" meant when the car was introduced.

It is often assumed that the letters stand for Sport Leicht. One car magazine in 2012 declared that the abbreviation "SL" - "securitized and personally signed by Rudolf Uhlenhaut" meant Super Leicht. This contradicts another source, written in close cooperation with Rudolf Uhlenhaut, which stated that the abbreviation meant Sport Leicht.

Mercedes-Benz used both forms until 2017. It was even called Super Super. On the company website it was called Sport Leicht until 2017 and then changed to Super Leicht.

For a long time it was unclear what intention the company had at the time when assigning the letter combination. It was not until the beginning of 2017 that a chance finding in the corporate archive, from the early part of 1952, clarified that at least in the case of the 300 SL the abbreviation SL stood for Super-Leicht.

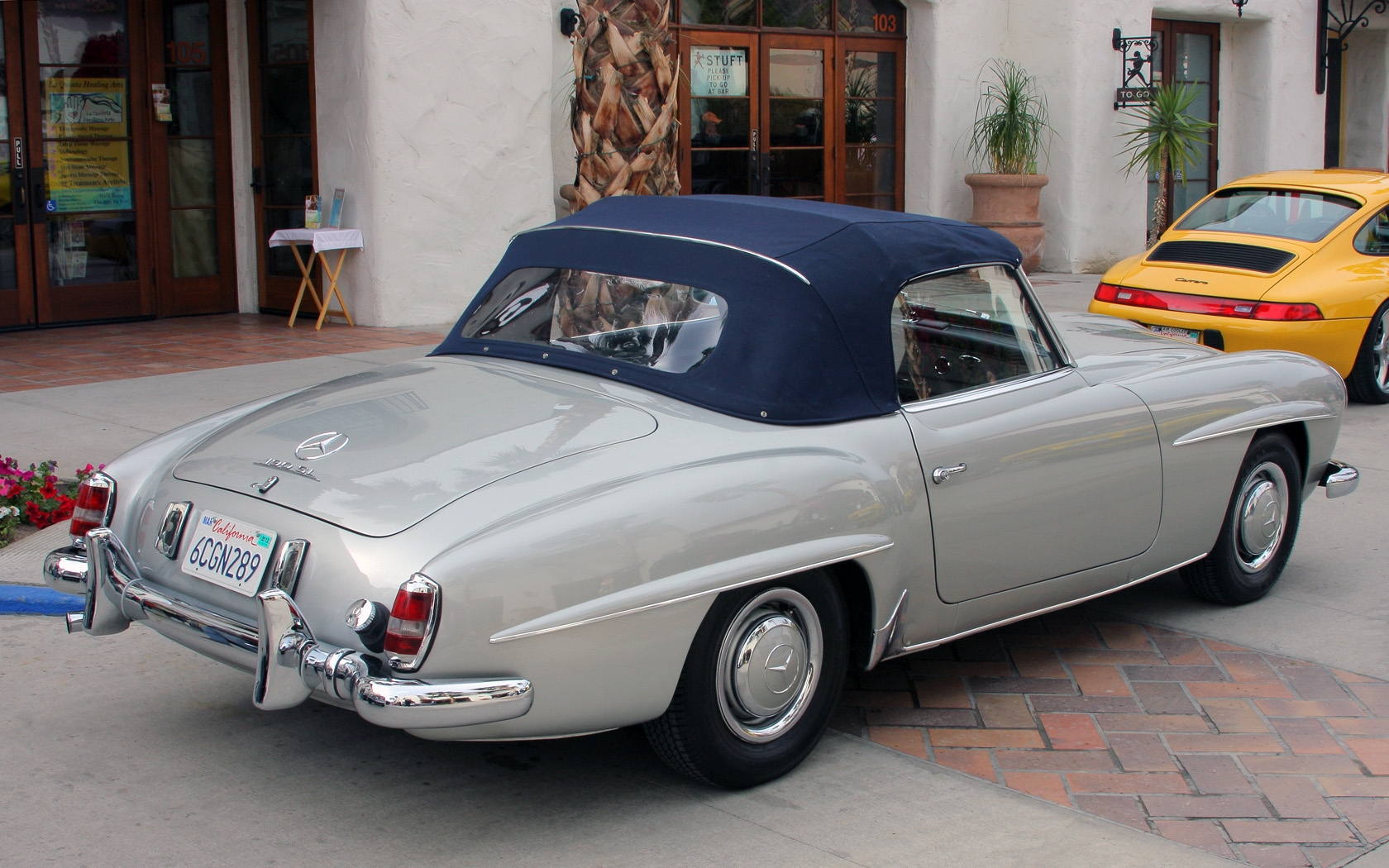
1962 Mercedes-Benz 190 SL fitted with softtop

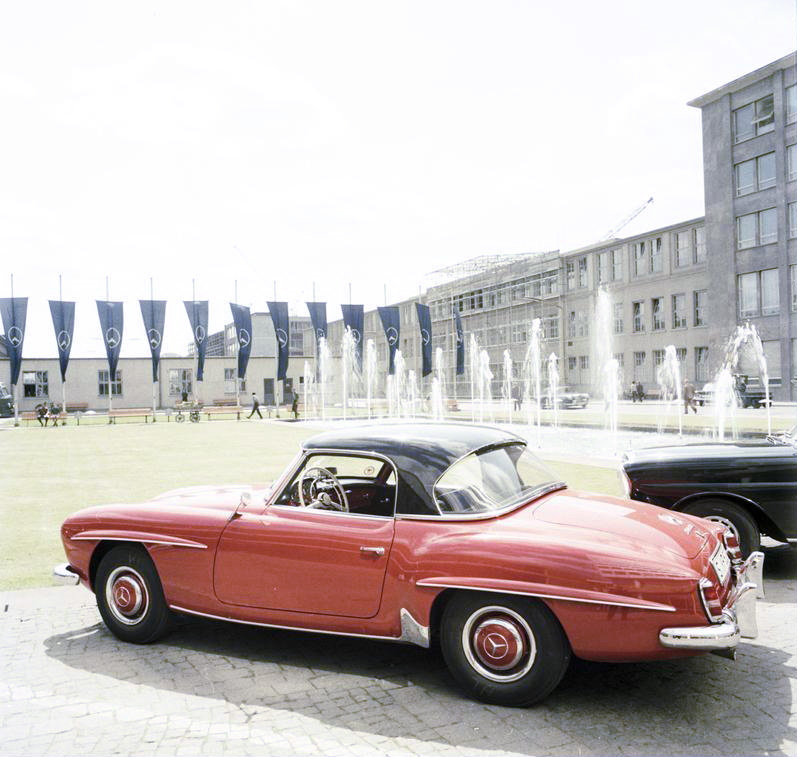
1962 Mercedes-Benz 190SL with removable hardtop

== Technical data ==
Technical data Mercedes-Benz 190 SL (Manufacturer's figures except where stated)
Mercedes-Benz	190 SL
Produced:	1955–1963
Engine:	4-cylinder-inline engine (four-stroke), front-mounted
Bore x Stroke:	85 mm x 83.6 mm
Displacement:	1897 cc
Max. Power @ rpm:	105 PS (77 kW; 104 hp) @ 5700
Max. Torque @ rpm:	142 N⋅m (105 lb⋅ft) @ 3200
Compression Ratio:	8.5: 1, from 09/59 8.8:1
Fuel feed:	twin two barrel sidedraft carburetors – Solex 44PHH
Fuel tank capacity:	65 L (17.2 US gal; 14.3 imp gal)
Valvetrain:	SOHC, duplex chain
Cooling:	Water
Gearbox:	4-speed manual, lever between seats rear-wheel drive, standard axle ratio 3.90:1
Electrical system:	12-volt
Front suspension:	Double wishbones, coil springs, stabilizing bar
Rear suspension::	Swing axle, coil springs
Brakes:	Drum brakes (Ø 230 mm), power assisted
Steering:	Recirculating ball steering
Body structure:	Sheet steel, uni-body construction
Dry weight:	1,160 kg (2,560 lb) (Hardtop: + 20 kg (44 lb))
Loaded weight:	1,400 kg (3,100 lb), from 1961 1,440 kg (3,170 lb)
Track front/ rear:	1,430 mm (56.3 in) 1,475 mm (58.1 in)
Wheelbase:	2,400 mm (94.5 in)
Length:	4,290 mm (168.9 in)
Width:	1,740 mm (68.5 in)
Height:	1,320 mm (52.0 in)
Tyre/Tire sizes:	6.40–13 Sport
Top speed:	173 km/h (107 mph)
Fuel Consumption (estimate):	12.5 litres per 100 kilometres (22.6 mpg_{‑imp}; 18.8 mpg_{‑US})

== See also ==
- Mercedes-Benz SL-Class
- Mercedes-Benz Classic Center
