= Mercedes-Benz OM621 engine =

Mercedes-Benz OM621
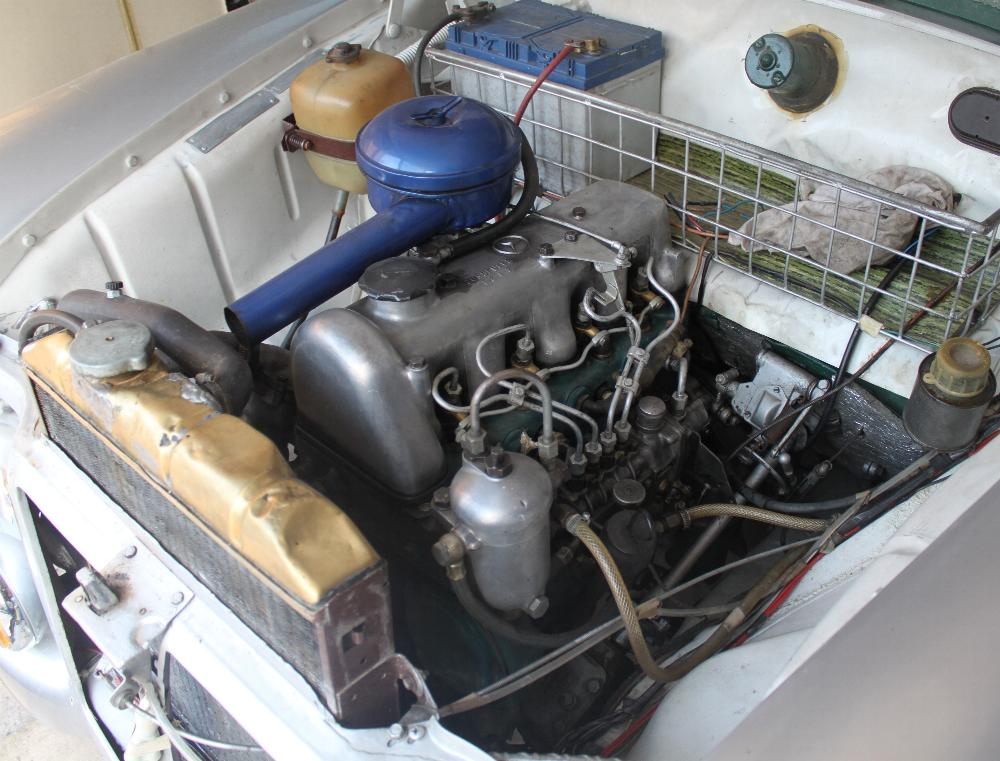
- OM621 engine, mounted in a W121 (190D).

Overview
- Manufacturer: Mercedes-Benz
- Production: 1956–1968

Layout
- Configuration: Inline-four engine
- Displacement: 1.9 L (1,897 cc); 2.0 L (1,988 cc); 2.2 L (2,197 cc)
- Cylinder bore: 85–87 mm (3.35–3.43 in)
- Piston stroke: 83.6 mm (3.29 in)
- Cylinder block material: Cast Iron
- Cylinder head material: Cast Iron
- Valvetrain: SOHC
- Compression ratio: 18.0:1

Combustion
- Fuel system: Indirect injection
- Fuel type: Diesel
- Cooling system: Water cooled

Output
- Power output: 35–40 kW (48–54 PS; 47–54 hp)
- Torque output: 108–118 N⋅m (80–87 lb⋅ft)

Chronology
- Predecessor: Mercedes-Benz OM636 engine
- Successor: Mercedes-Benz OM615 engine

The OM621 is an inline-four diesel engine produced by Mercedes-Benz from 1956 to 1968, variously in displacements of 1.9 L (115.8 cu in), 2.0 (121.3 cu in), and 2.2 L (134.1 cu in). It was preceded by the OM636, and succeeded by the OM615.

== Design ==
The OM621 is based on the petrol M121 engine, but features revised camshafts, cylinder head, pistons, and fuel injection system. In 1961, the engine capacity was increased to 2.0 L (1,988 cc) and power was uprated to 55 PS (40 kW) for use in the newly introduced W110 models. After being replaced by the OM615, a 2.2 L (2,197 cc) updated version of the OM621 engine was used solely in Unimog vehicles until 1988.

== Models ==
| Engine | Displacement | Power | Torque | Years |
|---|---|---|---|---|
| OM621 I | 1.9 L (1,897 cc) | 37 kW (50 PS; 50 hp) at 4,000 rpm | 108 N⋅m (80 lb⋅ft) at 2,200 rpm | 1958–1959 |
| OM621 IV | 2.0 L (1,988 cc) | 35 kW (48 PS; 47 hp) at 3,800 rpm | 108 N⋅m (80 lb⋅ft) at 2,200 rpm | 1961–1962 |
| OM621 III / VIII | 2.0 L (1,988 cc) | 40 kW; 54 hp (55 PS) at 4,200 rpm | 118 N⋅m (87 lb⋅ft) at 2,400 rpm | 1961–1968 |
| OM621 III / VIII | 2.2 L (2,197 cc) | 40 kW; 54 hp (55 PS) at 3,000 rpm | 118 N⋅m (87 lb⋅ft) at 2,400 rpm | 1966–1988 |

=== OM621 (37 kW version) ===
37 kW (50 PS; 50 hp)

- 1958–1959 W121 190D, 190Db

=== OM621 (35 kW version) ===
35 kW (48 PS; 47 hp)

- 1961–1962 W120 180Dc

=== OM621 (40 kW version) ===
40 kW (54 PS; 54 hp)

- 1961–1965 W110 190Dc
- 1965–1968 W110 200D
- 1966–1988 Unimog 421
