= Mercedes-Benz 170S =

Mercedes-Benz 170 S
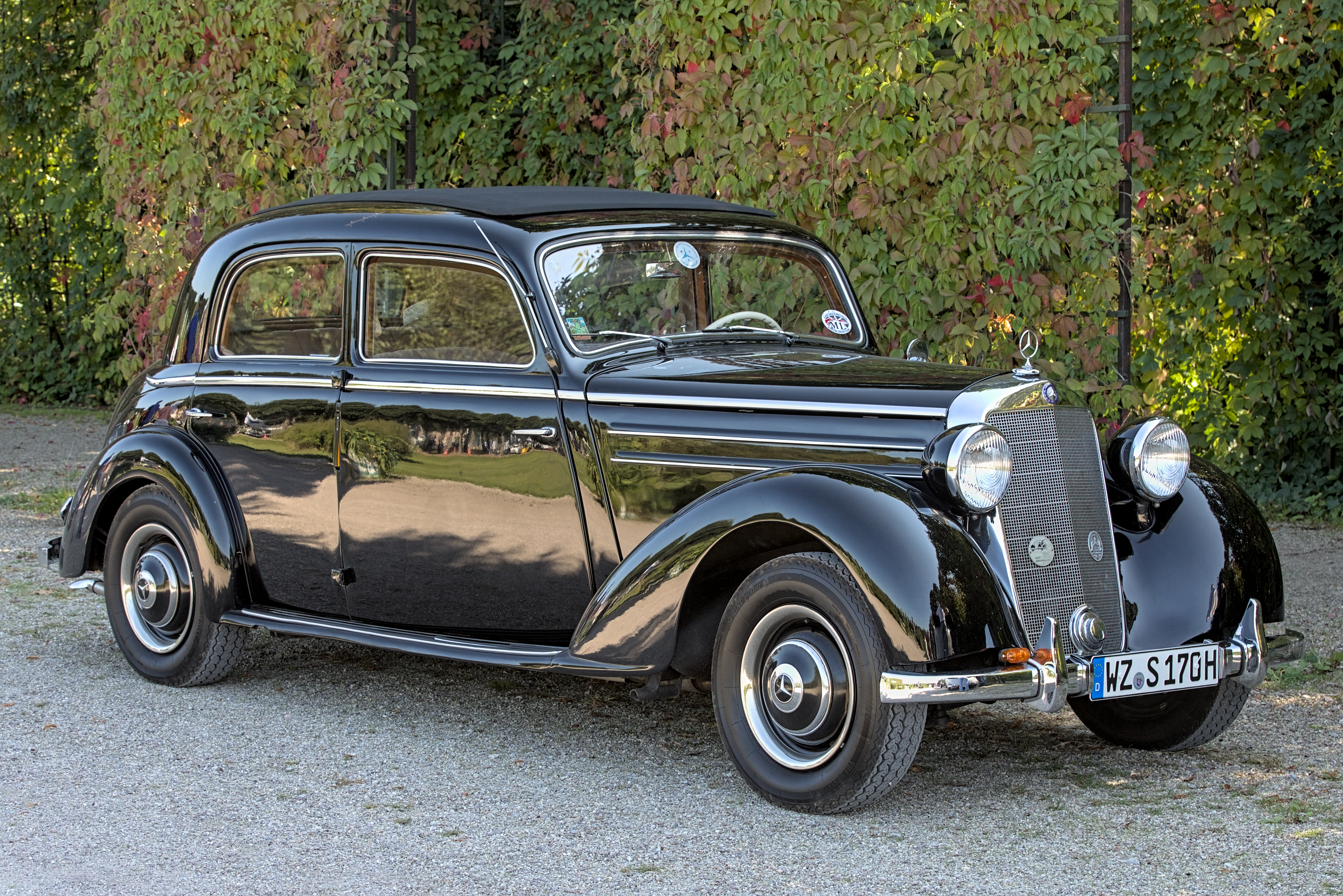
- Mercedes-Benz 170 S

Overview
- Manufacturer: Daimler-Benz
- Also called: Mercedes-Benz 170 S (W 136); Mercedes-Benz 170 Sb/170 DS (W 191); Mercedes-Benz 170 S-V/170 S-D (W 136)
- Production: 170S: 1949–1952; 31,197 units 170Sb / 170DS: 1952–1953; 21,079 units 170 S-V / 170 S-D: 1953–1955; 18,009 units
- Assembly: West Germany: Stuttgart; Argentina: Buenos Aires

Body and chassis
- Class: Mid-size luxury / Executive car (E)
- Body style: 4-door saloon 1949–1955; 2-door, 2- and 4-seater cabriolets 1949–1951
- Layout: FR layout

Powertrain
- Engine: petrol: 1767 cc M136 I4; diesel: 1767 cc OM636 I4

Dimensions
- Wheelbase: 2,845 mm (112.0 in)
- Length: 4,455 mm (175.4 in) (1949–1953); 4,450 mm (175 in) (1953–1955)
- Width: 1,584 mm (62.4 in)

Chronology
- Predecessor: Mercedes-Benz W136
- Successor: Mercedes-Benz W120/W121

The Mercedes-Benz 170 S is a luxury car which was produced by Mercedes-Benz from 1949 until 1955 in various gasoline and diesel powered forms. It was initially offered with a 1.8 liter version of the 1.7 liter inline-four cylinder M136 engine used in the slightly smaller production type 170 V. It was the first Mercedes-Benz to carry in its name the suffix “S” (for Sonder modell (Special model) denoting a superior level of comfort and quality. As such, its intended market was successful business owners and company directors.

The 170 S was released in May 1949, initially sharing the chassis number of the W136 170 V, and closely resembled it. However, in several respects it was more directly a development from the six-cylinder W153 Mercedes-Benz 230 which the company had produced, albeit in small numbers, between 1938 and 1943.

The first 170 S upgrade occurred in January 1952, being further distanced from the 170 V with its own chassis number W191. Mercedes' introduction a year earlier of the 2.2-liter, six-cylinder M180 engined Mercedes-Benz W187 luxury 220 model, positioned between the 170 S and the company's flagship, 3.0-liter Mercedes-Benz W186 Adenauer tourers undermined the four cylinder 170 S's luxury niche.

With the arrival of the all-new 1.8 liter Mercedes-Benz W120 180 "Ponton" in 1953 the 170 S was discontinued and a 170 S-V employing the 170 S' larger engine but the 170 V's slightly smaller body was introduced. Reverting to the W136 chassis code, the S-V ceased production in 1955.

== Models ==
=== 170 S (W136: 1949–1952) ===
The Mercedes-Benz 170 S which appeared in May 1949 was 170 mm (7 in) longer, 104 mm (4 in) wider, and better appointed than the 170 V. The 170 V's 1697 cc M136 four-cylinder gasoline/petrol engine was enlarged to 1767 cc, providing a maximum output of 52 PS (38 kW), whereas the smaller engine produced 38 PS (28 kW). Performance was correspondingly enhanced, with a stated top speed of 122 km/h (76 mph). It shared the four speed all-synchromesh transmission of the 170 V.

The front wheels were attached using coil springs and double wishbones with a stabilizer bar, as opposed to the simple lateral leaf-spring arrangement on the 170 V.

Since the war the only version of the Mercedes-Benz 170 V available to the public had come with a four-door sedan/saloon body. With the 170 S the manufacturer now recalled some of the wider range of bodies offered on the 170 V before the war, adding a two-seat "Cabriolet A" and a four-seat "Cabriolet B".

Although the 170 S was promoted as a car for company directors, the soubriquet of "first S-Class Mercedes-Benz" which began to be applied to it more than twenty years later, following the launch of the manufacturer's W116 is not one that would have been used or recognized in the 1950s.

A year after the introduction of the 170 S, its M136 was also installed in the 170 V. However, both the compression ratio and the carburettor differed, so that the power advantage for the 170 S was reduced – from a difference of 14 PS to one of 7 PS – rather than eliminated.

=== 170 Sb / 170 DS (W191: 1952–1953) ===
In January 1952 the Mercedes-Benz 170 Sb replaced the 170 S model. The car now received a works number of its own, becoming known internally as the "Mercedes-Benz W191". Both cabriolet versions had been withdrawn in November 1951, cabriolet buyers now being catered for by the cabriolet versions of the six-cylinder Mercedes-Benz W187 220 model. The 170 Sb was therefore available only with a four-door sedan/saloon body. Other changes included in the 1952 upgrade included the replacement of the floor-mounted gear lever with a then fashionable column mounted gear lever. There was now a starter button on the dashboard and the heater was improved. Under the bonnet/hood the camshaft was now driven via a chain rather than via gear cogs, a hypoid differential was fitted and the rear track was increased by 15 mm (0.59 in).

January 1952 also saw the launch of a diesel powered version of the 170 S, sold as the Mercedes-Benz 170 DS and carrying, like its gasoline/petrol powered sibling, the works designation "W191". It shared the 40 PS (29 kW) OM636 diesel power unit of the diesel powered 170 V and came with the same official top speed of 105 km/h (65 mph). In 1952 diesel powered passenger cars were still very much a novelty even in Germany. The relatively lumpy engine note and reduced performance of the diesel car were at variance with the up-market image of the 170 S, but no doubt both cost conscious company directors and upmarket taxi operators appreciated the >25 percent improvement in fuel consumption using a fuel which, on account of the tax rates applied, was already provided at a relatively low price in Germany.

=== 170 S-V / 170 S-D (W136: 1953–1955) ===
With the appearance of the new 1.8 liter Mercedes-Benz 180 "Ponton" in 1953, the 170 S model suddenly appeared very old fashioned. The 170 V would be delisted in September 1953, and in July 1953 the manufacturer replaced the existing 170 S with the reduced specification 170 S-V. The car that resulted combined the slightly larger body from the 170 S with the less powerful 45 PS (33 kW) engine that had previously powered the 170 V. The vehicle provided reduced performance but at a reduced price, while salesmen steered more prosperous buyers to the new 180. The diesel powered 170 S continued to be sold, now branded as the 170 S-D. The internal "W191" designation which had distinguished the previous 170 S was removed, and the 170 S manufactured from 1953 returned to the "W136" designation that they had shared till the end of 1951.

In September 1955 the Mercedes-Benz 170 S-V was withdrawn from production. There was no direct replacement. By now economic recovery was setting in strongly, and Mercedes-Benz hoped to persuade company directors to buy a six-cylinder Mercedes-Benz. In its final version, more than 80 percent of the cars sold were diesel powered, versus just over a 60 percent ratio of diesels for the W191. suggesting that for the most part, cost conscious taxi operators had replaced status conscious executives as 170 S customers. 3,122 petrol/gasoline powered 170 S-V models were sold as against 14,887 diesel-powered 170 S-D models between 1953 and 1955.

== Gallery ==
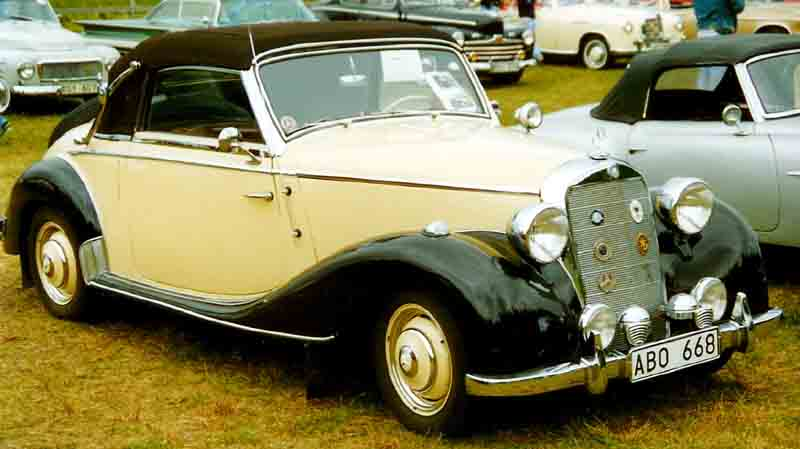
Mercedes-Benz 170 S “Cabriolet A” (i.e. two seater cabriolet) 1949–1951

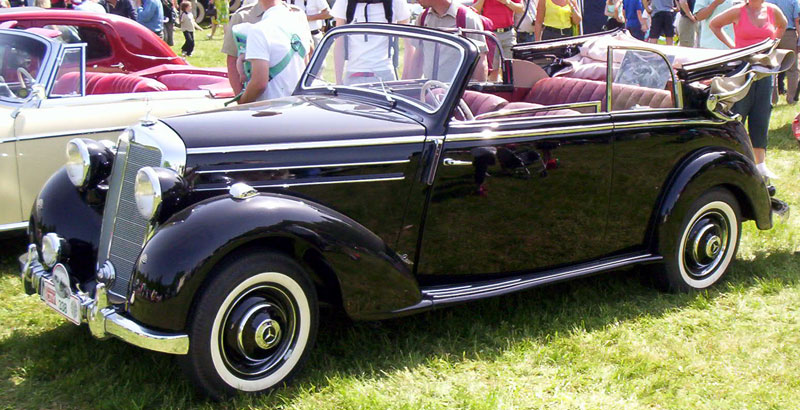
Mercedes-Benz 170 S “Cabriolet B” (i.e. four seater cabriolet) 1949–1951

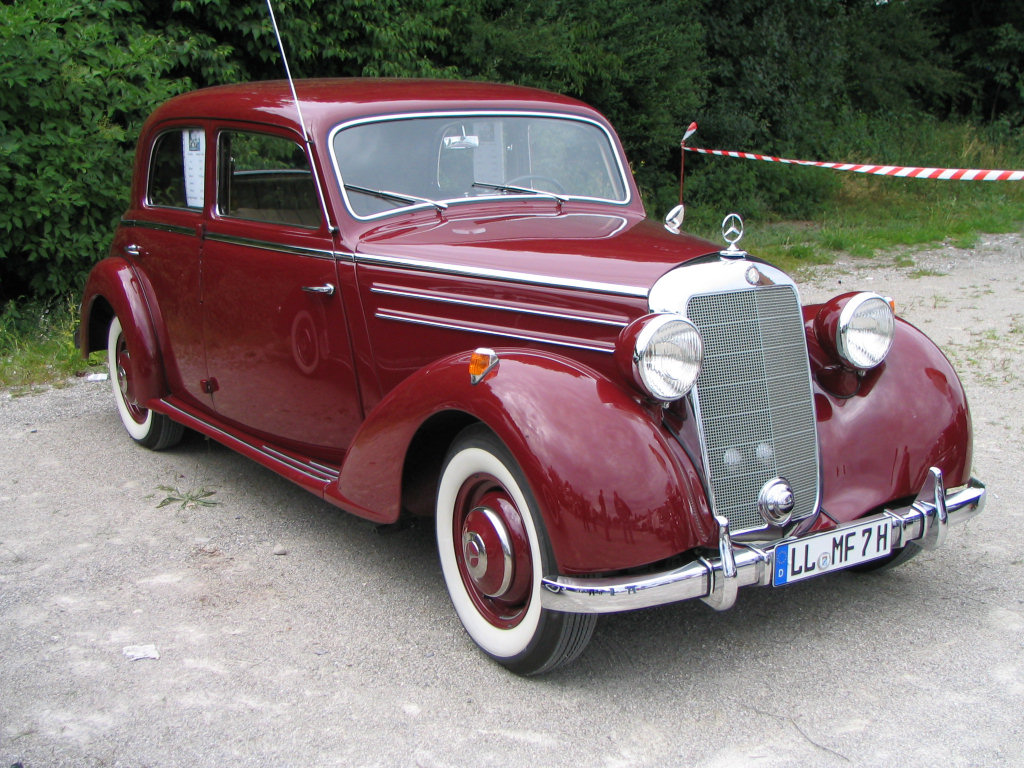
Mercedes-Benz 170 V / 170 S

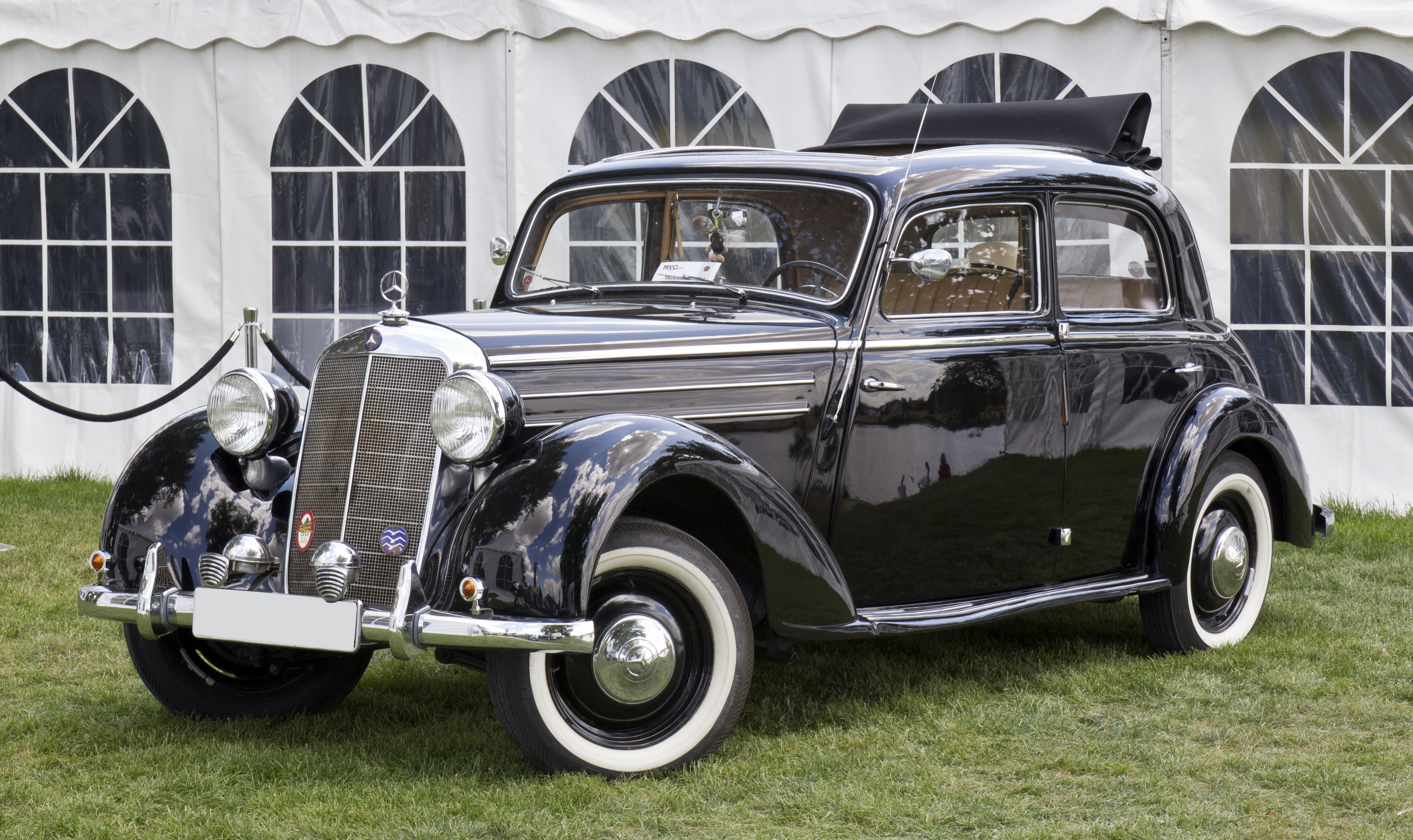
Mercedes-Benz 170 DS

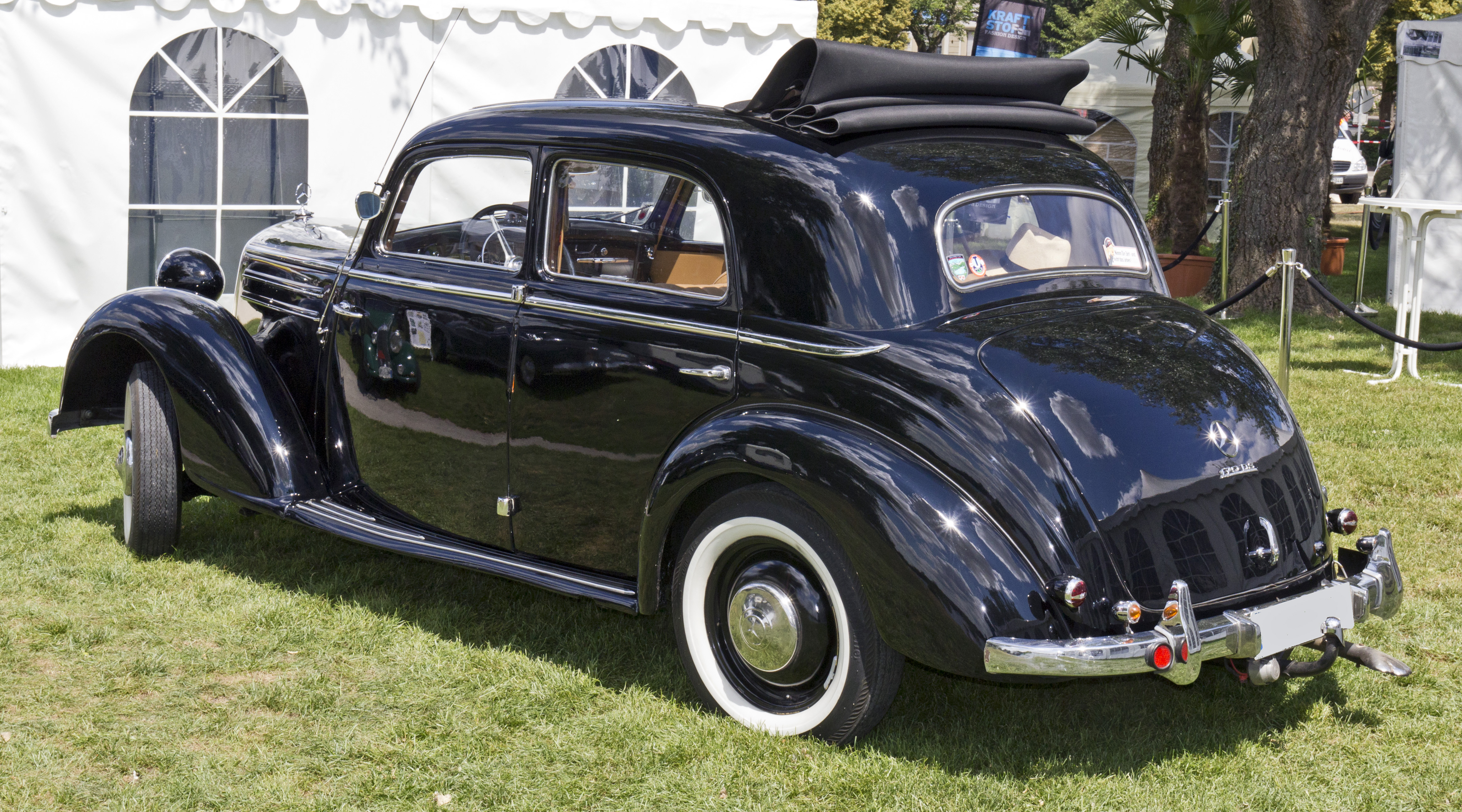
Mercedes-Benz 170 DS rear view

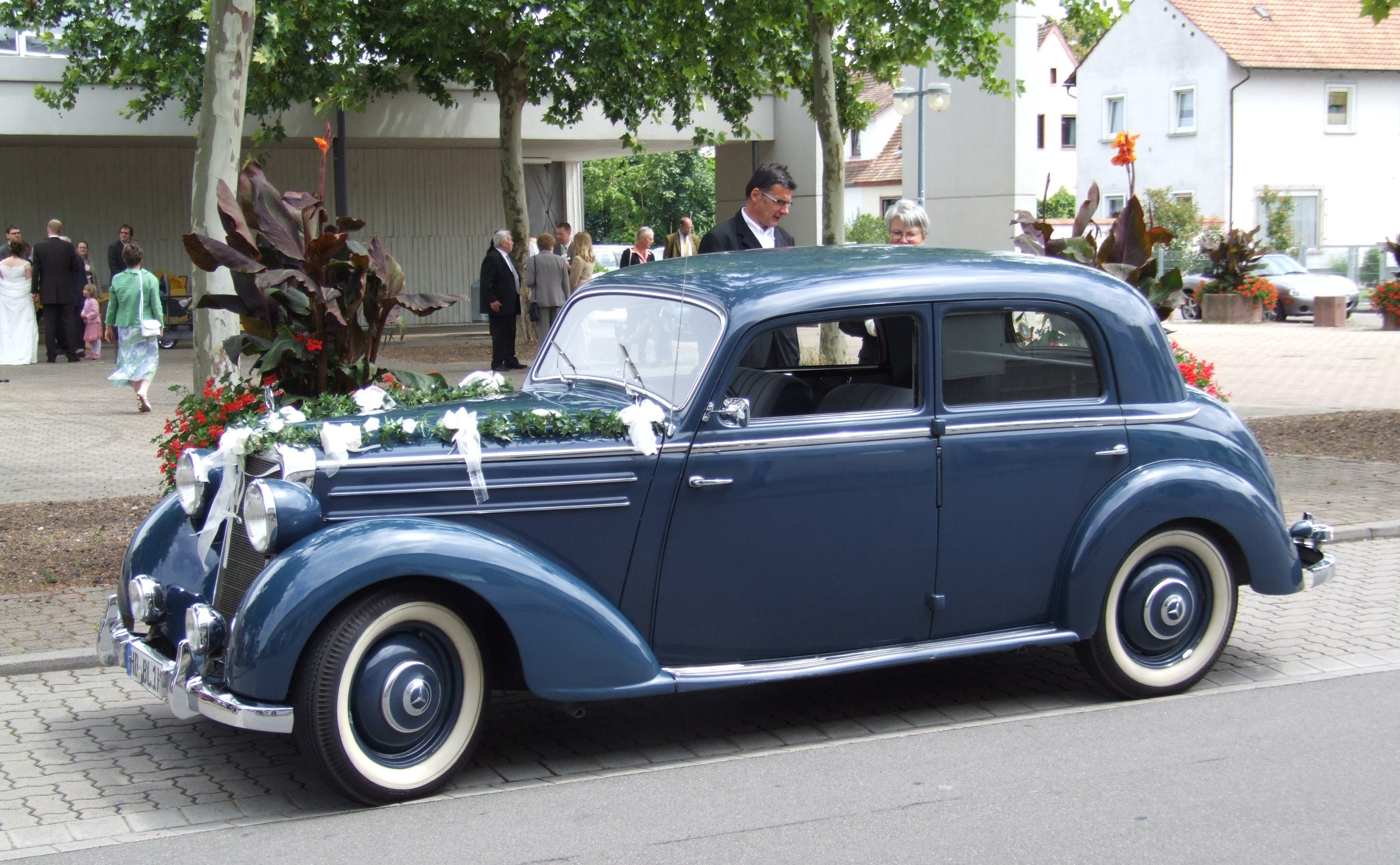
1953 Mercedes 170 DS (Model W191)

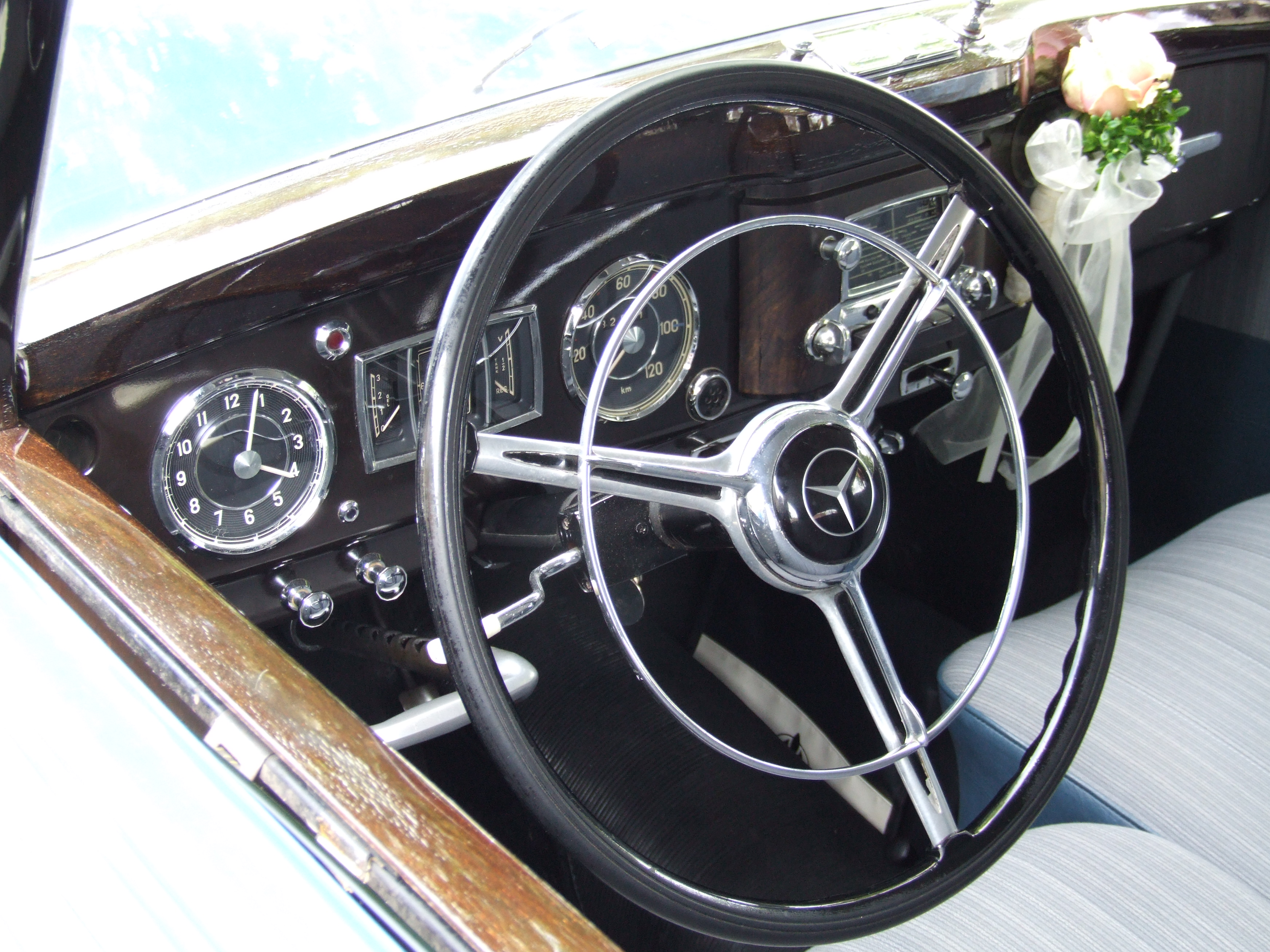
Dashboard of a Mercedes 170 DS (Model W191)
