= Mercedes-Benz OM636 engine =

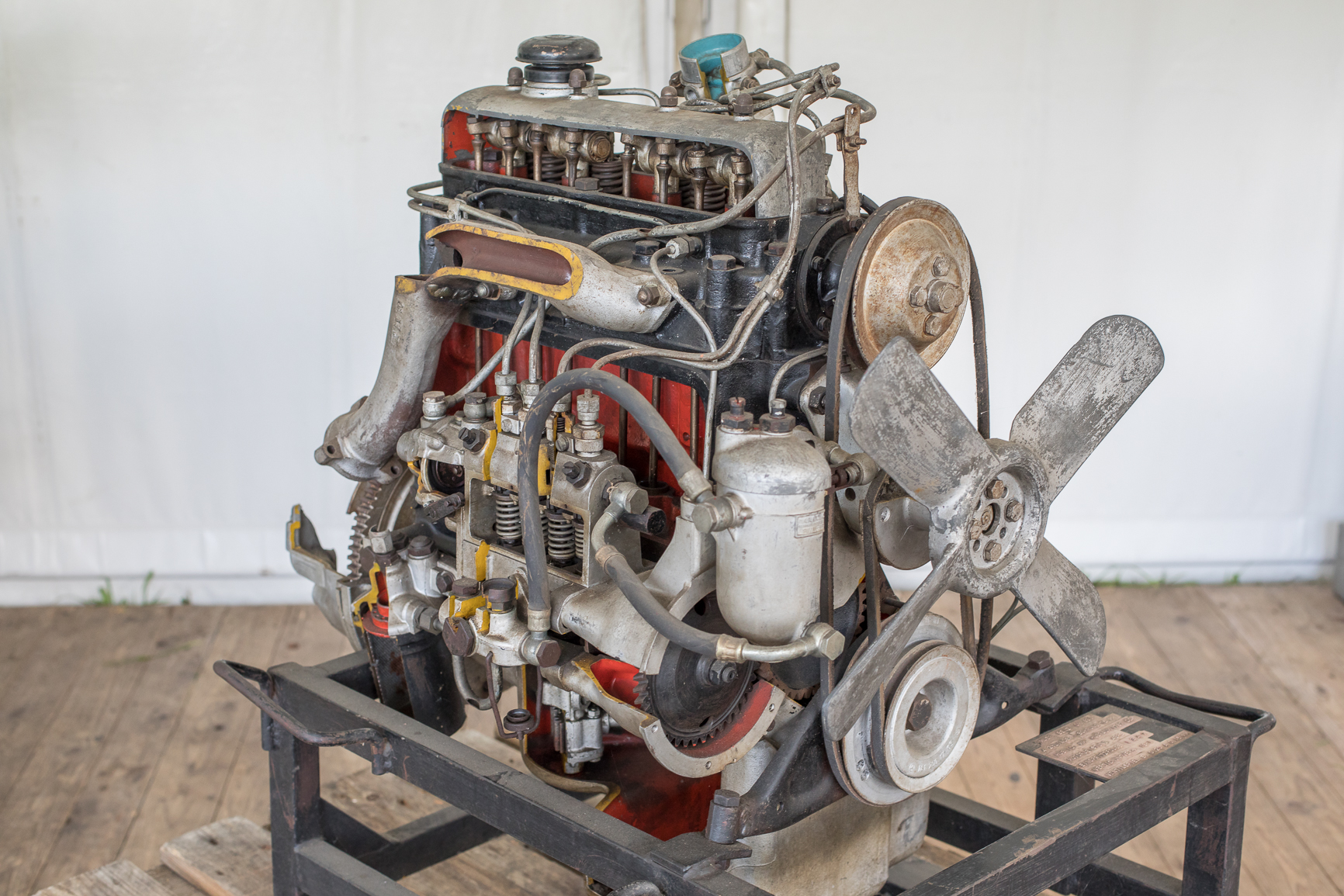

Overview
- Manufacturer: Daimler-Benz AG
- Production: 1948 (pre-series production); 1949–1990 (series production)

Layout
- Configuration: Inline 4
- Displacement: 1,697 cc (103.6 cu in); 1,767 cc (107.8 cu in)
- Cylinder bore: 73.5 mm (2.89 in); 75 mm (2.95 in)
- Piston stroke: 100 mm (3.94 in)
- Cylinder block material: Cast iron
- Cylinder head material: Cast iron
- Valvetrain: OHV
- Compression ratio: 19.0:1

RPM range
- Max. engine speed: 3600

Combustion
- Operating principle: Diesel
- Fuel system: Precombustion chamber injection
- Fuel type: Gasoil
- Oil system: Wet sump
- Cooling system: Water-cooled

Output
- Power output: 28–32 kW (38–44 PS; 38–43 hp)
- Torque output: 96–101 N⋅m (71–74 lb⋅ft)

Chronology
- Predecessor: OM 138
- Successor: OM 621

The Mercedes-Benz OM636 is a diesel engine that was produced by Daimler-Benz from 1948 until 1990. Being the successor to the OM138, the OM636 has been used both as a passenger car engine and as an industrial engine. It saw its first use in the Boehringer Unimog in 1948, prior to its official introduction in the 1949 Mercedes-Benz W136. Throughout the 1950s, the OM636 was widely used in the Mercedes-Benz W120. In 1958, it was succeeded by the OM621 passenger car engine. However, after the introduction of the OM621, the OM636 was kept in production for industrial vehicles such as small lorries, boats, and combine harvesters, until 1990.

The abbreviation OM means Oelmotor (oil engine), and stands for a Daimler-Benz engine that uses any kind of light fuel oil as fuel (diesel engine).

== History ==
Daimler-Benz began developing the OM636 during World War II, and had completed the developing process by 1948. According to Carl-Heinz-Vogler, a former Daimler-Benz engineer, the OM636 was ready for series production in 1948. The pre-series production units made that year were used in the 1948 Boehringer Unimog.

In 1949, the W136 was offered with the OM636, displacing 1.7 litres and producing 38 PS (28 kW). For a short period of time between January 1952 and August 1953, a facelifted version of the W136 (now having the chassis code W191) was sold. Its OM 636 was increased in power by 2 PS. In 1953, the W120 succeeded the W191, starting in 1954 it was offered with an upgraded version of the OM636, now displacing 1.8 litres and again making 40 PS (29 kW). After the introduction of the W110 in 1961, the OM636 was no longer used as a passenger car engine by Daimler-Benz. Production in Germany was stopped in the early 1960s, while continuing until 1990 in Spain.

In 1969, the Spanish automotive manufacturer SEAT presented the SEAT 1800 D, a version of the SEAT 1500 equipped with Mercedes-Benz OM636 diesel engine. The version used was the OM636.954, built in Barcelona under license, displacing 1.8 L (1,767 cc) and producing 46 PS (34 kW) at 3,600 rpm.

== Technical description ==
The OM636 is a water-cooled inline-four-cylinder diesel engine with precombustion chamber injection, eight valves, OHV valvetrain and wet sump lubrication. It has a cross-flow cylinder head made of grey cast iron. The cylinder block material is also grey cast iron. Both the crankshaft, which is supported in three bearings, and the connection rods are forged. The pistons are made of a light metal alloy. The camshaft is driven by gears, it also drives the inline injection pump. The camshaft and injection pump are placed on the engine's exhaust side.

== Technical data ==
Engine code	Engine name	Bore × Stroke	Displacement	Compression ratio	Rated power (DIN 70020)	Torque (DIN 70020)	Source
OM636.915	OM636 I	73.5 mm × 100 mm (2.89 in × 3.94 in)	1,697 cc (103.6 cu in)	19.0:1	38 PS (28 kW; 37 hp) at 3200 rpm	9.8 kg⋅m (96 N⋅m; 71 lb⋅ft) at 2000 rpm	
OM636.912	OM636 I	73.5 mm × 100 mm (2.89 in × 3.94 in)	1,697 cc (103.6 cu in)	19.0:1	25 PS (18 kW; 25 hp) at 2300–rpm		
OM636.916	OM636 VI	75 mm × 100 mm (2.95 in × 3.94 in)	1,767 cc (107.8 cu in)	19.0:1	40 PS (29 kW; 39 hp) at 3200 rpm	10.3 kg⋅m (101 N⋅m; 75 lb⋅ft) at 2000 rpm	
OM636.931	OM636 VIII	75 mm × 100 mm (2.95 in × 3.94 in)	1,767 cc (107.8 cu in)	19.0:1	40 PS (29 kW; 39 hp) at 3200 rpm	10.3 kg⋅m (101 N⋅m; 75 lb⋅ft) at 2000 rpm	
OM636.930	OM636 VII	75 mm × 100 mm (2.95 in × 3.94 in)	1,767 cc (107.8 cu in)	19.0:1	40 PS (29 kW; 39 hp) at 3200 rpm	10.3 kg⋅m (101 N⋅m; 75 lb⋅ft) at 2000 rpm	
OM636.930	OM636 VII	75 mm × 100 mm (2.95 in × 3.94 in)	1,767 cc (107.8 cu in)	19.0:1	43 PS (32 kW; 42 hp) at 3500 rpm	10.3 kg⋅m (101 N⋅m; 75 lb⋅ft) at 2000 rpm	
OM636.914	OM636 VI	75 mm × 100 mm (2.95 in × 3.94 in)	1,767 cc (107.8 cu in)	19.0:1	30 PS (22 kW; 30 hp) at 2550 rpm		
OM636.914	OM636 VI	75 mm × 100 mm (2.95 in × 3.94 in)	1,767 cc (107.8 cu in)	19.0:1	32 PS (24 kW; 32 hp) at 2550 rpm		
OM636.914	OM636 VI	75 mm × 100 mm (2.95 in × 3.94 in)	1,767 cc (107.8 cu in)	19.0:1	34 PS (25 kW; 34 hp) at 2750 rpm		
OM636.914	OM636 VI	75 mm × 100 mm (2.95 in × 3.94 in)	1,767 cc (107.8 cu in)	19.0:1	25 PS (18 kW; 25 hp) at 2300 rpm		
OM636.954		75 mm × 100 mm (2.95 in × 3.94 in)	1,767 cc (107.8 cu in)	19.0:1	46 PS (34 kW; 45 hp) at 3200 rpm	10.3 kp⋅m (101 N⋅m; 75 lb⋅ft)	

== See also ==
- List of Mercedes-Benz engines

== Bibliography ==
- Der 1,8-l-Dieselmotor des Mercedes-Benz 170 Da in: Kraftfahrzeugtechnik 7/1952, p.211-213
