= Mercedes-Benz W110 =

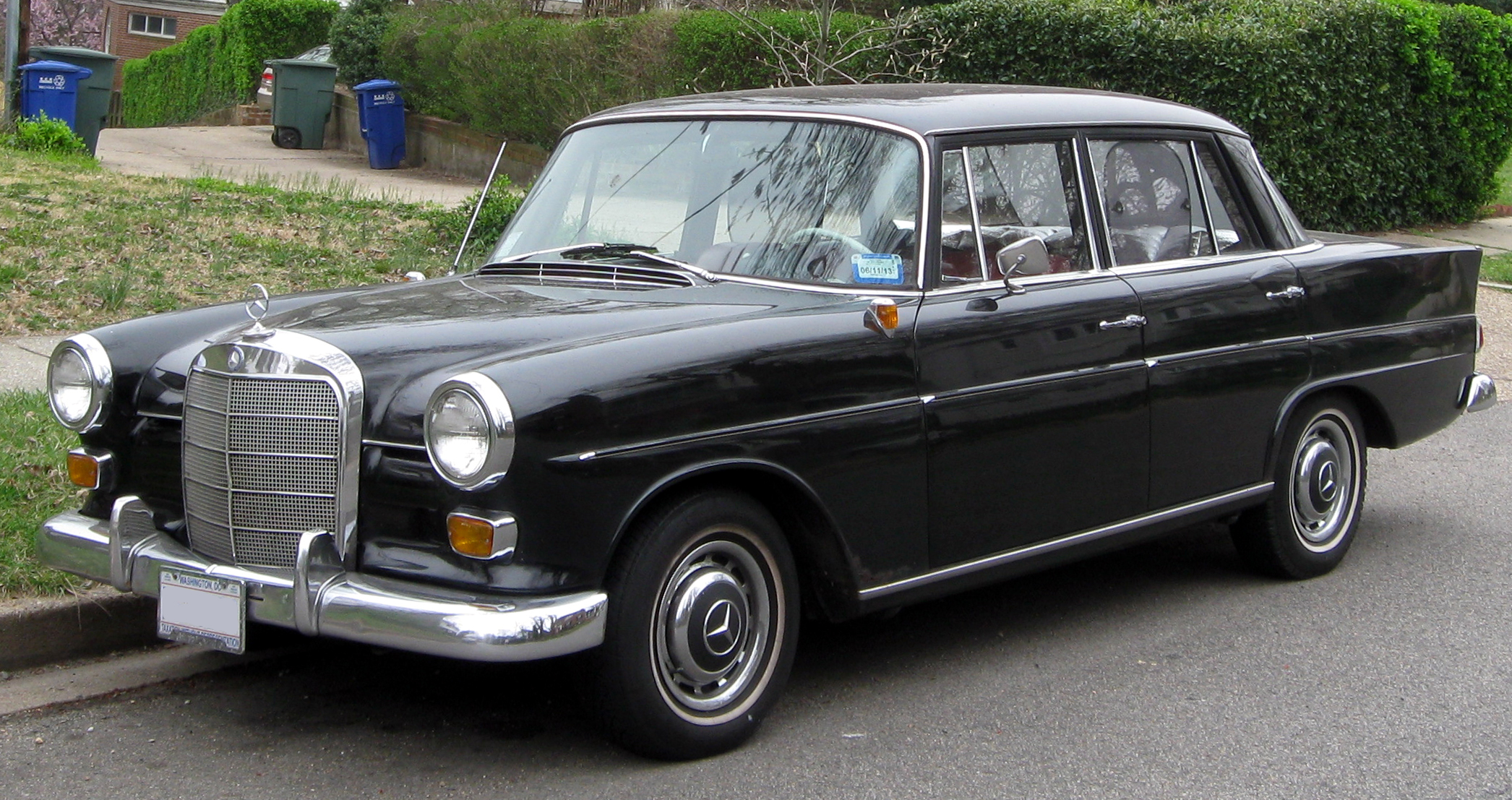
- Mercedes-Benz 190Dc (W110)

Overview
- Manufacturer: Daimler-Benz
- Production: 1961–1968; 628,282 built (see text)
- Assembly: West Germany: Sindelfingen; Australia: Port Melbourne (AMI); South Africa: East London; Venezuela: Barcelona

Body and chassis
- Class: Executive car (E)
- Layout: FR layout
- Related: Mercedes-Benz E-Class

Dimensions
- Wheelbase: 2,700 mm (106.3 in)
- Length: 4,730 mm (186.2 in)
- Width: 1,795 mm (70.7 in)
- Height: 1,495 mm (58.9 in)
- Curb weight: 1,289–1,365 kg (2,841.8–3,009.3 lb)

Chronology
- Predecessor: Mercedes-Benz W120/W121
- Successor: Mercedes-Benz W114/W115

The Mercedes-Benz W110 is a line of mid-size primarily inline four-cylinder executive cars produced by Mercedes-Benz between 1961 and 1968. The company's basic line of for much of the 1960s, it was part of Mercedes' unified platform of "Fintail" (German: Heckflosse) models – first introduced as a six-cylinder Mercedes-Benz W111 in 1959.

The 190c and 190Dc sedans debuted in April 1961, replacing the W120 180c/180Dc and W121 190b/190Db. The gasoline-powered 190c was fitted with the 1.9 L M121, an upgrade from the 1.8 L M136, and the 190Dc the 2.0 L OM621 diesel, an upgrade from the obsoleted 1.8 L OM636.

The W110 line was refreshed in July 1965, with an engine displacement increase to 2.0 litres and a second carburetor giving more power to the new gasoline 200 model that replaced the 190, and an improved already 1988 cc diesel fitted in the new 200D that replaced the 190Dc.

The W110 range gained a new model, the 230, a downscaled version of the 6-cylinder W111 220S (with the commensurate new 230S replacing the W111 line's 220Sb and 220SEb).

Production of the W110 lasted just three more years, until the W114 '220' and W115 '220D' introduced in 1968.

The Mercedes-Benz W110 and the six-cylinder W111 were the first series of Mercedes cars to be extensively crash tested for occupant safety.

== First series (1961–1965) ==
First Series 190c/190Dc
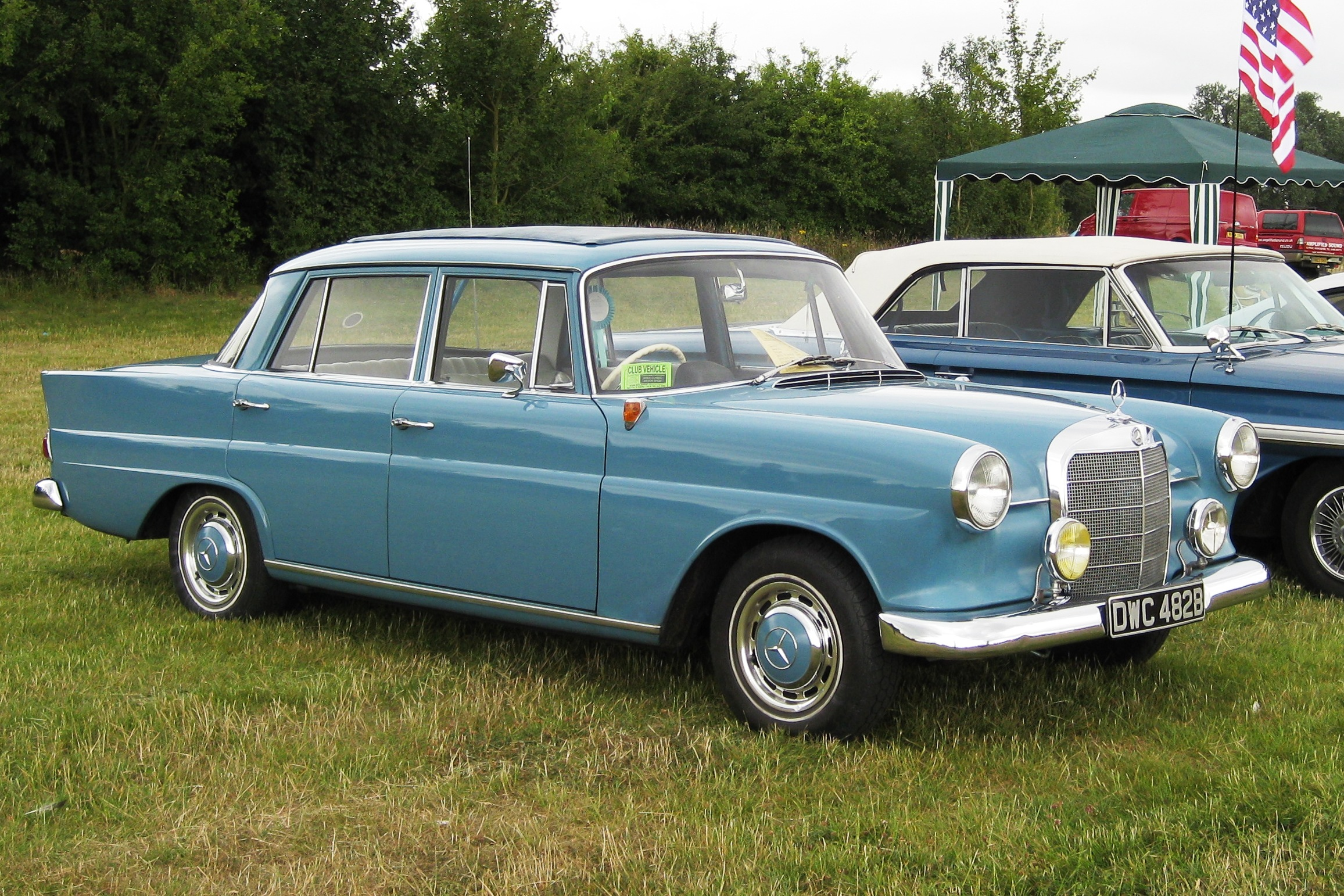
- 1964 Mercedes-Benz 190 (W110 First Series)

Overview
- Production: 1961–1965

Powertrain
- Engine: 1.9 L M121 I4; 2.0 L OM621 diesel I4

Dimensions
- Curb weight: 1,250 kg (2,760 lb)

The 190c and 190Dc replaced the W120 180c/180Dc and W121 190b/190Db as Mercedes-Benz's line of entry-level four-cylinder sedans. The "D" denoted a Diesel engine, a technology pioneered by Mercedes-Benz and championed despite widespread derision in the motoring press. The gasoline powered 190c received the 1.9 L M121 engine, and the diesel powered 190Dc received the 2.0 L OM621.

The shared body was derived from the W111 series but with a 145 mm (5.7 in) shorter nose and round headlights. The rear end was identical to the base model W111 220b. The interior layout and dimensions were also identical to the W111 220b, but with less luxurious amenities and fewer options, such as bakelite trim rather than wood on the dashboard and fixed-back seats. Being shorter and more maneuverable yet having the same interior and luggage space as the W111 series made the more fuel efficient 190c and 190Dc models extremely popular with taxi drivers. Production of the 190Dc exceeded that of the petrol-engined 190c by nearly 100,000 units.

=== Models ===
Chassis code	Years	Model	Engine	Number built
W110.010	1961–1965	190c	1.9 L M121 I4	130,554
W110.110	1961–1965	190Dc	2.0 L OM621 diesel I4	225,645

== Second series (1965–1968) ==
Second Series 200/200D/230
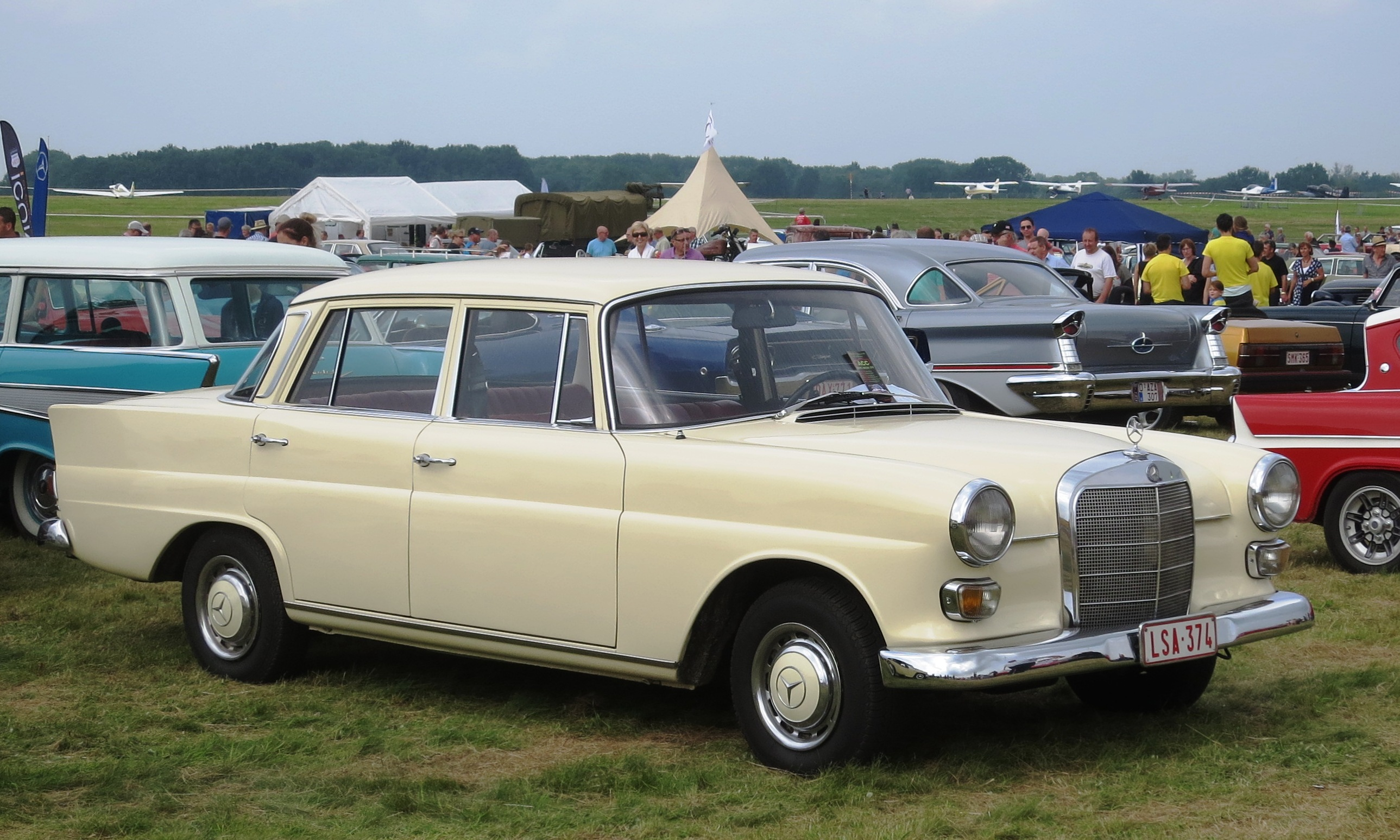
- Mercedes-Benz 200D (W110)

Overview
- Production: 1965–1968

Powertrain
- Engine: 2.0 L M121 BIX I4; 2.3 L M180 I6; 2.0 L OM621 diesel I4

The second series of 4-cylinder W120/W121 cars, the new 200, 200D and 230 models, commenced in July, 1965, and lasted two and one-half years. The 200 and 200D replaced the 190c and 190Dc models respectively, and a new 6-cyclinder 230 model was added to the line, a bored out W111 220b.

The 200 received an enlarged version of the 1,897 cc (1.9 L; 115.8 cu in) M121 gasoline engine, bored out from 85 to 87 mm, to 1,988 cc (2.0 L; 121.3 cu in), given a second carburetor, and designated the M121 BIX. The 55 PS (40 kW; 54 hp) OM621 diesel engine in the 200D was essentially identical to that of the 190Dc (which had already been 1988 c.c. despite the car being labelled as a '190') but was improved by using a five main bearing crankshaft instead of the original three. The 230 received a 2,307 cc (2.307 L; 140.8 cu in) variant of the straight-6 M180 engine.

A detuned version of the 230S engine, it was given the carburetor system from the 2-liter M121 4-cylinder engine, and produced 105 PS (77 kW; 104 hp). From July 1966 on it received the unmodified 230S engine, raising output to 120 PS (88 kW; 118 hp) and improving both top speed and acceleration.

Visually, the second series W110 models had the front indicators relocated from the top of the front fenders to below the headlights. At the rear, the tail lights were squared off and the chrome trim was revised to feature two horizontal trim strips instead of chrome-trimmed tail fins. All models gained air outlets with chrome trim on the C-pillars to match the W111 sedans. Inside, there were very few changes, with optional reclining backs on individual front seat models becoming standard. The 230 came with a central rear armrest.

Further changes occurred in late 1967 for the 1968 U.S. model year, including collapsible steering columns to meet new American safety regulations. Mirrors, interior door handles, and dashboard switchgear were also changed, matching those on the later W108/114/115 series cars.

All three of the W110 second series cars ended production in January 1968 with the introduction of the W115 220 and 220D.

=== Models ===
Chassis code	Years	Model	Engine	Number built
W110.010	1965–1968	200	2.0 L M121 I4	70,207
W110.011	1965–1968	230	2.3 L M180 I6	40,258
W110.110	1965–1968	200D	2.0 L OM621 I4	161,618

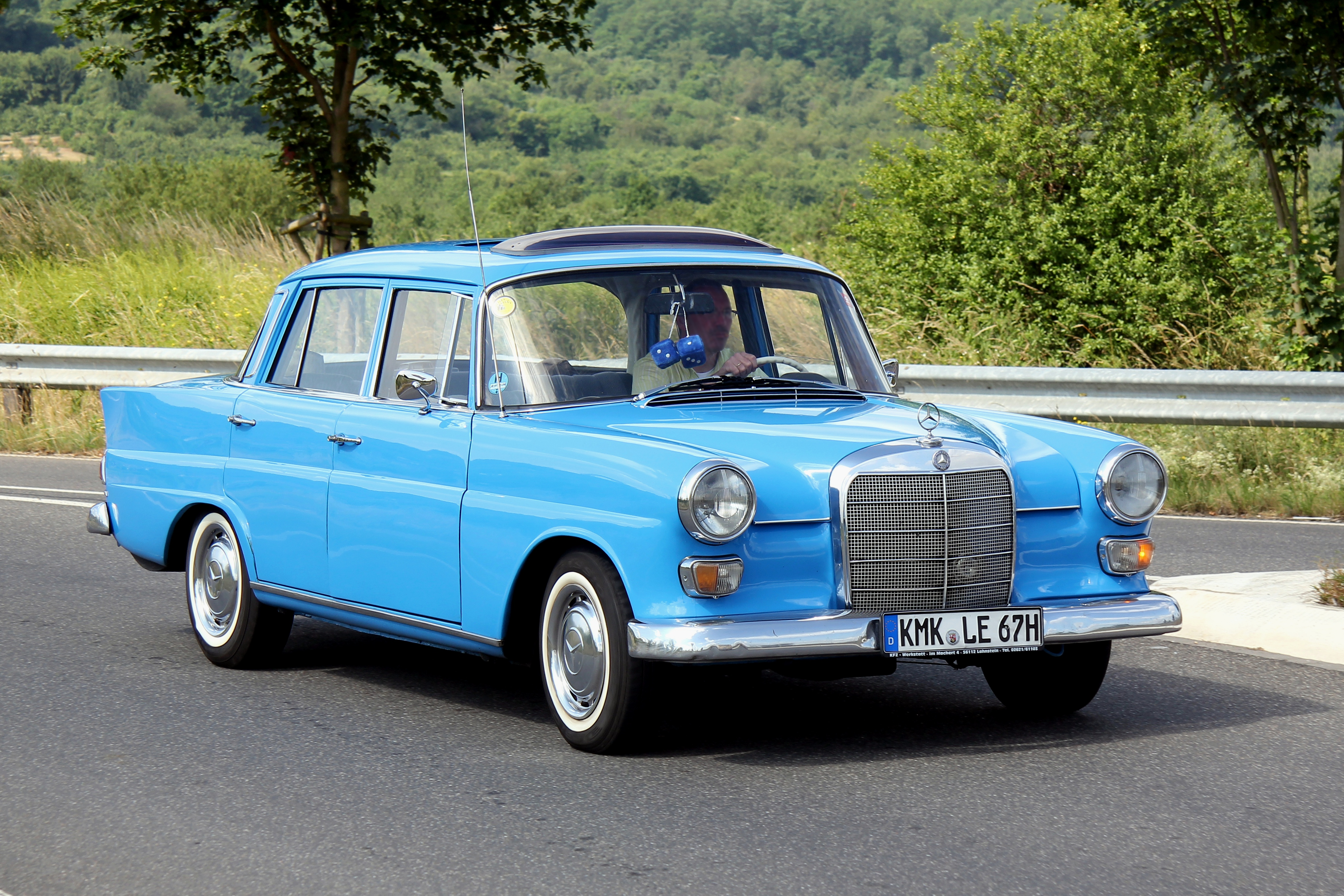
Mercedes-Benz 200D

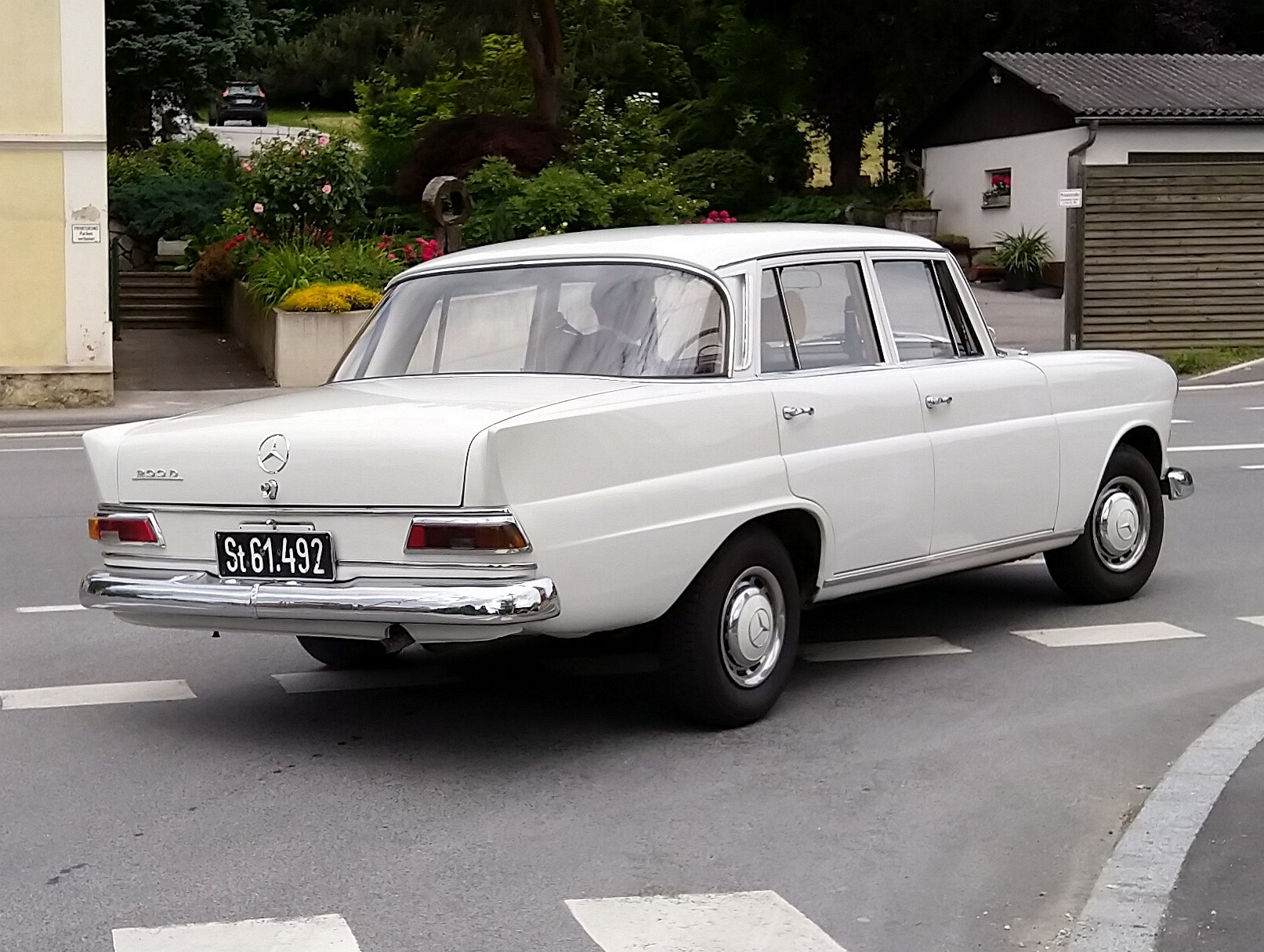
Mercedes-Benz 200D

=== Timeline ===
Chassis	Type	1962	1963	1964	1965	1965.5	1966	1967	1968
W110	sedan	190c				230			
W110	sedan	190c				200			
W110	sedan	190Dc				200D			

== Estate car ==
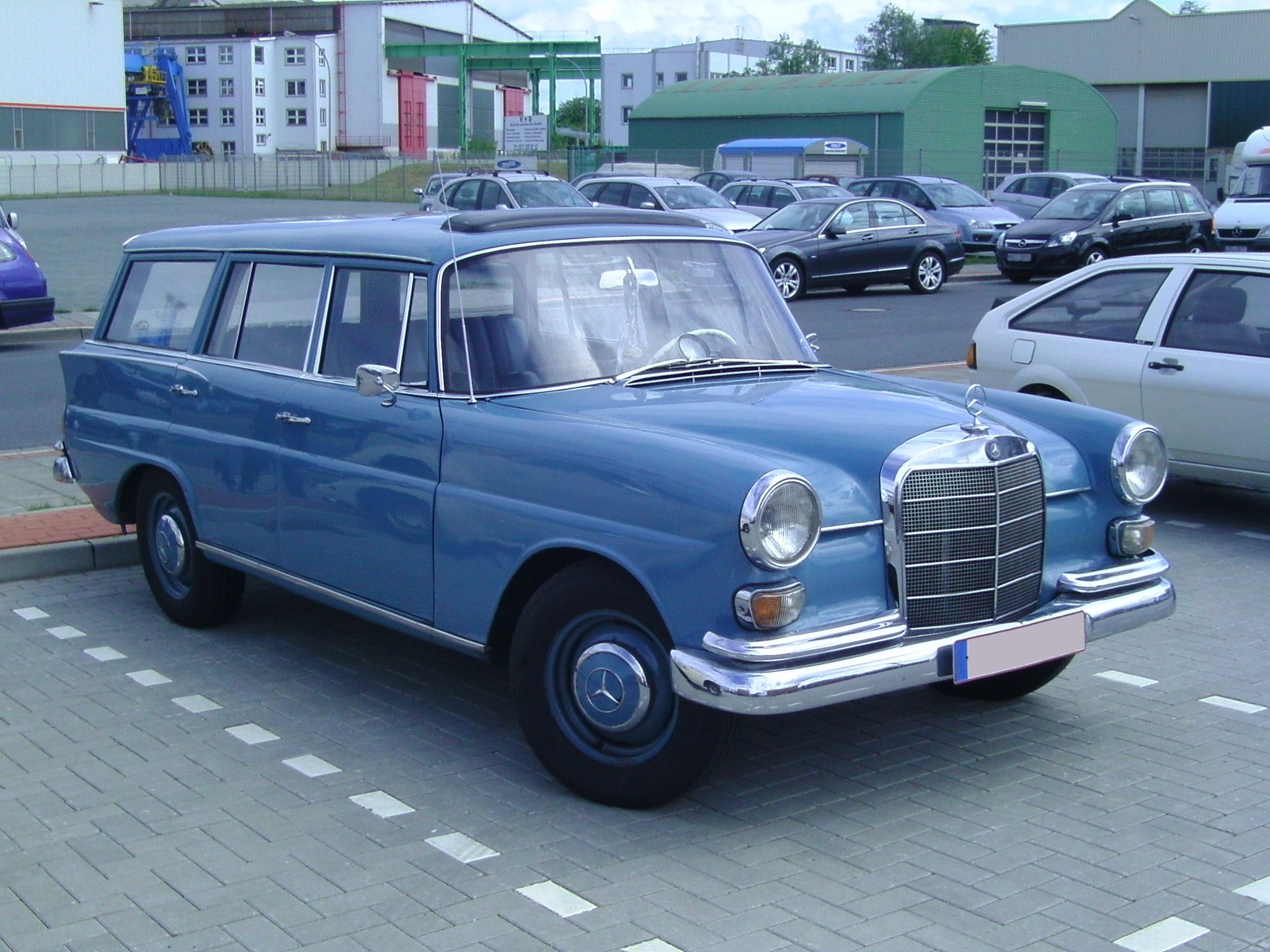
Mercedes-Benz W110 Estate

An estate version of the 230S four-cylinder-engined car was introduced in 1965 by IMA (Société Anonyme pour l'Importation de Moteurs et d'Automobiles), Mercedes-Benz's Mechelen based Belgian importer. The conversion achieved modest success in certain markets including Germany, Belgium and the UK. For tariff-related reasons, AMA already had been assembling saloon version of the cars from CKD kits. The model was updated just six months into production to incorporate changes introduced by the July 1965 Mercedes-Benz update of the W110 line, which also spawned 6-cylinder 230 and 230S IMA versions of the estate.

With the reduction in tariffs that followed the development of the EEC, small-scale assembly of this kind within the EEC but outside Germany no longer made sense, and assembly of the Mercedes-Benz cars at Mechelen stopped in 1973, by which time the plant had assembled 78,568 four-cylinder Mercedes-Benz cars based on the W111 and its W114 successor.

In addition, the Lorch-based coachbuilder Binz built ambulance conversions based on the W110, and also designed a rare three-row, seven-seat version of W110 with 65 cm (25.6 in) extended wheelbase, that was assembled in Mercedes-Benz factory in Sindelfingen.
