= Mercedes-Benz M121 engine =

Mercedes-Benz M121
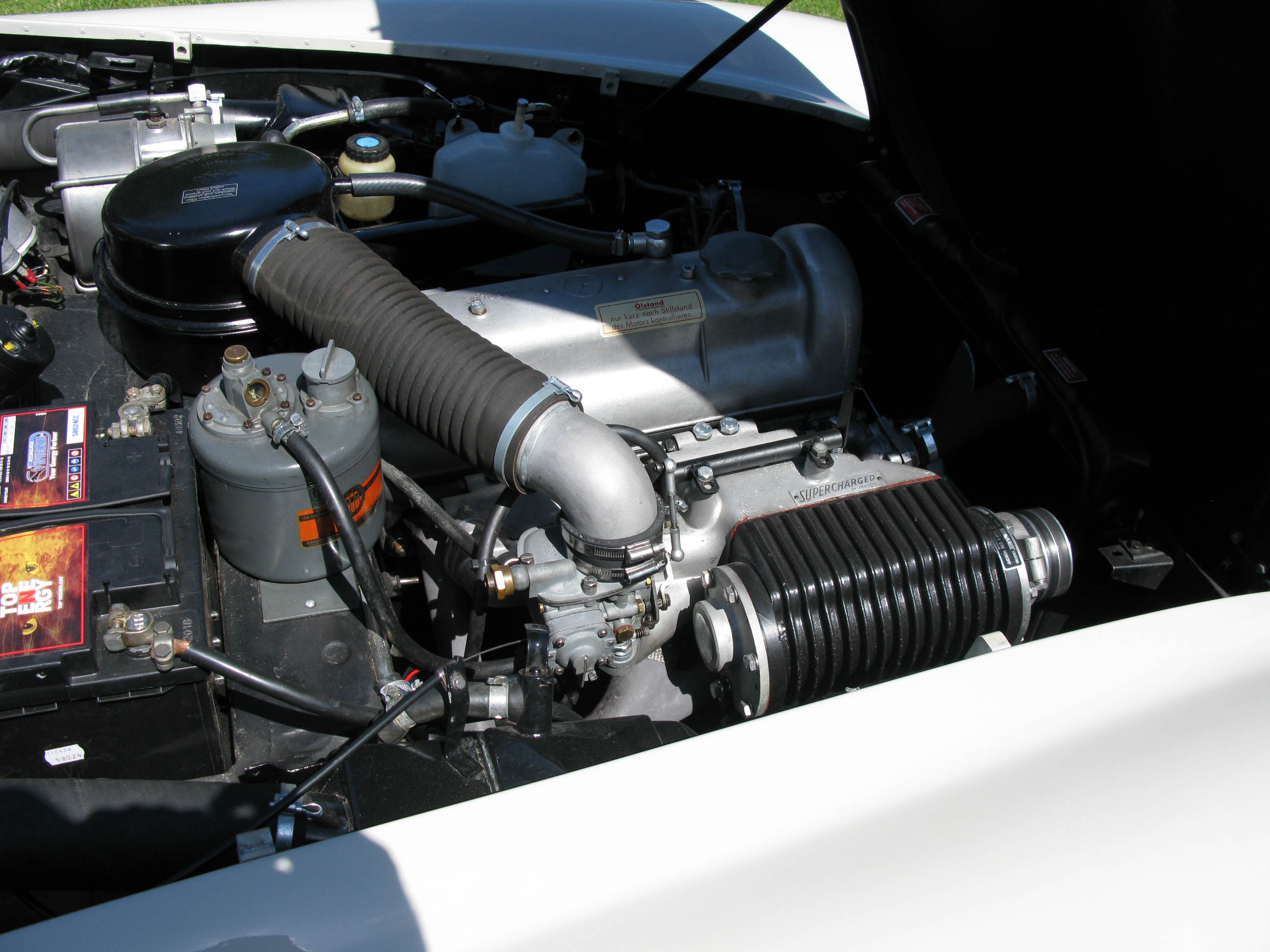

Overview
- Manufacturer: Mercedes-Benz
- Production: 1955-1967

Layout
- Configuration: inline 4
- Displacement: 1.9 L (1,897 cc); 2.0 L (1,988 cc)
- Cylinder bore: 85 mm (3.35 in); 87 mm (3.43 in)
- Piston stroke: 83.6 mm (3.29 in)
- Cylinder block material: Cast iron
- Valvetrain: SOHC 2 valves x cyl.
- Compression ratio: 8.5:1, 9.0:1

Combustion
- Fuel system: Twin parallel Solex 38PDSJ carburetors
- Fuel type: Gasoline
- Cooling system: Water cooled

Output
- Power output: 75–110 hp (56–82 kW; 76–112 PS)
- Torque output: 154 N⋅m (114 lb⋅ft)

Chronology
- Predecessor: M136
- Successor: M115

The Mercedes-Benz M121 engine was a single overhead camshaft inline four-cylinder engine used by Mercedes-Benz in 1955 in various model lines during the 1950s and 1960s. Based on the M180 six cylinder engine, introduced three years prior, it replaced the OHV M136 motor, that was in production since 1935.

The engine's first application was in the W121 Mercedes 190SL luxury roadster in May of 1955, built until Februarly 1962. After 1956 and until the close of 1967 it would power the entry level 180, 190 and 200 series of the W120, W121 and W110 sedans.

It 1958 a diesel version, OM621 would be produced alongside, sharing many of the components. In 1968 the engine would modernised into the M115, which would power the W115 and later the W123 sedans, and the W460 G-wagen, until its retirement in 1985. The diesel counterpart, the OM615 would also be produced until 1985. In 1973 a larger displacement 2.3 litre OM616 will join the lineup, and in 1974 a five cylinder OM617 will follow.

In addition and trucks such as the Unimog and L319 models. The M121 series was in production until 1967, when the M115 engine took its place.

== History ==
The M121 engine was developed just after the end of World War II. It was built in the Sindelfingen Works factory, which assembled the Mercedes Ponton Model series to which the engine belonged to. The M121 engine made its debut in 1955. It was the first generation of 4-cylinder engines from Mercedes Benz. The M121 replaced the less efficient M136 1.8-litre engine, a pre World War II engine that was introduced 2 years before in 1953. The M121 benefited from innovations and technology from Mercedes' larger engines such as the M186 3.0-litre and M180 2.2 liter engines. One of these innovations was a new single over head camshaft design which allowed for more power and efficiency. It was developed by a team led by Hans Scherenberg. Within this team, Karl-Heinz Goschel was one of the key engineers who developed the engine design.

== M121 variants ==
=== M121 ===
The M121 engine featured a single chain driven overhead camshaft layout with staggered valves operated by long and short rocker arms. The cylinder block was made from cast iron. The cylinder bore diameter for the M121 was 85 mm (3.35 in). The three ring crankshaft was forged. The stroke of the engine was 83.6 mm (3.29 in). This gave the M121 a displacement of 1.9 L (1,897 cc). The engine had a compression of 8.5:1 and a single exhaust. Through this configuration, the M121 BII engine had an initial rating of 110 hp (82 kW; 112 PS) at 5500 RPM and 114 lb⋅ft (155 N⋅m) of torque at 4000 rpm. After testing of the final vehicle, the power rating was lowered to 105 hp (78 kW; 106 PS). The crankshaft was initially carried by three main bearings, raised to five in the M121 BIX variant.

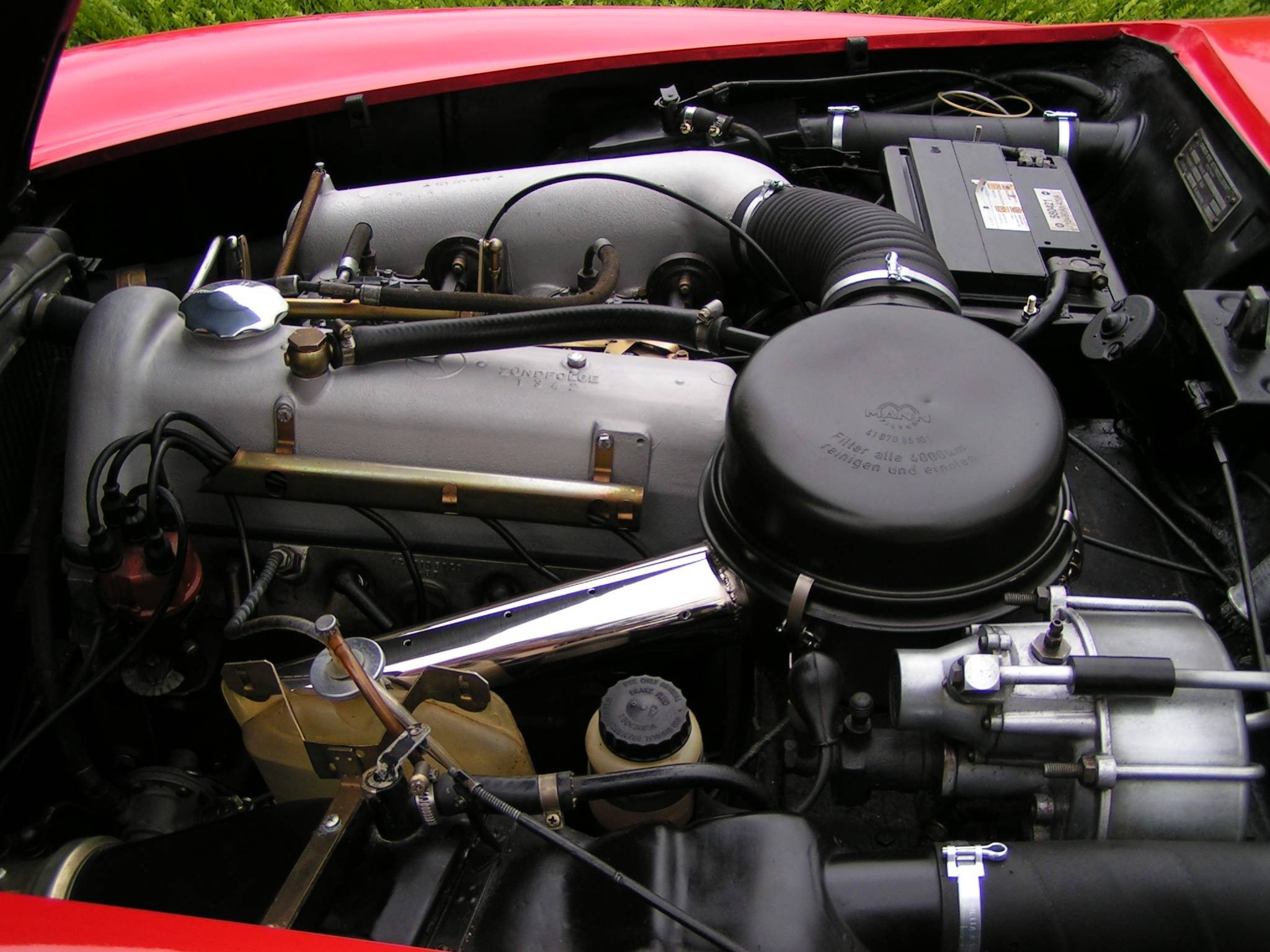
M121 engine in a 190SL

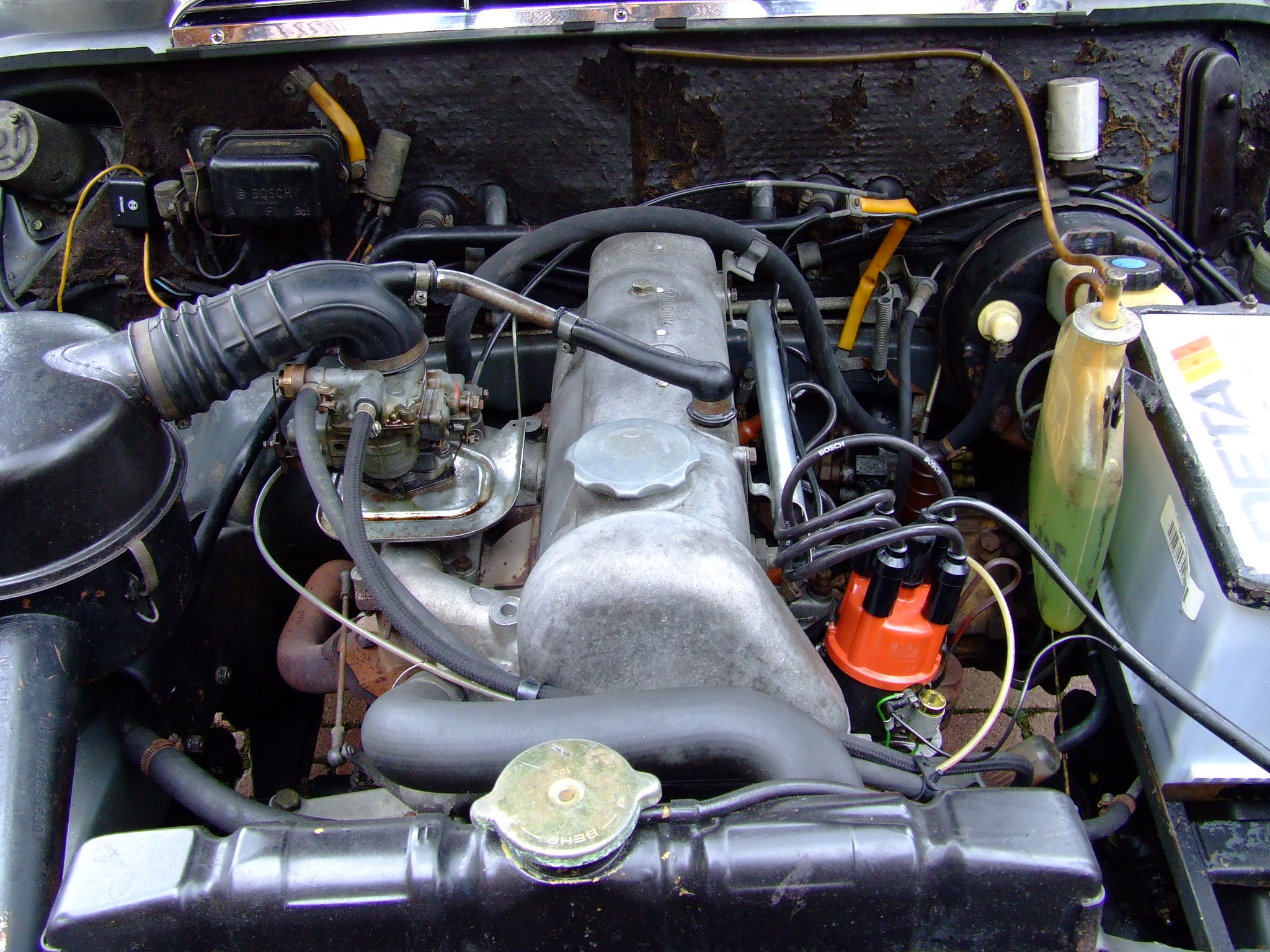
M121 engine 4-Cyl. 1.9 litres / 80 hp (60 kW; 81 PS) in a 1964 W110 190c

=== M121 BI ===
The M121 BI was developed for the new W110 190c introduced in 1961. It had an increase of 5 hp (4 kW; 5 PS), yet retained the same fuel consumption (11.5 L/100 km (25 mpg_{‑imp}; 20.5 mpg_{‑US}) on premium gasoline). Top speed increased to 150 km/h (93 mph) from 139 km/h (86 mph). Both performance increases were achieved despite the new model's significantly heavier bodywork required to meet new safety regulations.

=== M121 BII ===
The first version of the M121 to reach the market, the M121 BII was put into serial production in May of 1955 for use in the new W121 Mercedes 190SL roadster. Fitted with dual carburetors, it produced 105 hp (78 kW; 106 PS) at 5700 rpm. For the 190SL, acceleration to 100 km/h (62 mph) took 14.5 seconds, and the top speed was 180 km/h (110 mph). This made the M121 BII one of the faster engines on the road in its day. The fuel economy of the M121 BII was 8.6 L/100 km (33 mpg_{‑imp}; 27 mpg_{‑US}).

=== M121 BIX ===
The final version of the M121 engine was the 2.0 L M121BIX, produced from 1965 to 1968 for the new W110 Mercedes Benz 200. A 2 mm (0.079 in) increase in bore from 85 to 87 mm (3.35 to 3.43 in) enlarged displacement to 1.9 to 2.0 L (1,897 to 1,988 cc). Compression was increased to 9.0:1, the crankshaft went from three to five bearings, and a second Solex 38PDSJ carburetor was added. Combined, power was increased to 95 hp (71 kW; 96 PS) at 5200 rpm and 154 N⋅m (114 lb⋅ft) of torque was produced at 3600 rpm.

== Applications ==
The M121 engine was first employed in the 1956 Mercedes Benz W121 180 "Ponton". The subsequent 190 and 200 models featured an updated version which offered greater performance through variations in compression ratios and improved carburetor systems. Its use continued in the W110 "Fintail" 190c and 200. The M121 engine has also been used in trucks such as the Mercedes-Benz L319 introduced in 1967. 1967. Some Unimog off-road models also used the M121.
