= Karl Wilfert =

Karl Wilfert (1 July 1907, Vienna – 8 March 1976) was chief of car body development at Daimler Benz AG between 1959 and 1976.

When he died he was recently, and reluctantly, retired. “I still have so many ideas…”

He was born in Vienna, the son of an architect, and one of a creative generation of Austrian engineers to whom the early development of the European auto industry was much indebted. He started out as a development engineer with Steyr in 1926, moving in 1929 to work with the Mercedes-Benz Vienna branch, from where he relocated to the Mercedes Sindelfingen plant: here, from 1933, he headed up the Research department. In 1955 he switched to the design department, becoming director for car body development in 1959 at a time when the company was embarking on a period of intensive research into improving secondary safety – protecting the occupants of cars involved in accidents. His influence was especially evident in the designs of the SL sports cars, first the 300SL Gullwing and more recently the pagoda topped 230 SL.
