= Mercedes-Benz M136 engine =

Mercedes-Benz M136
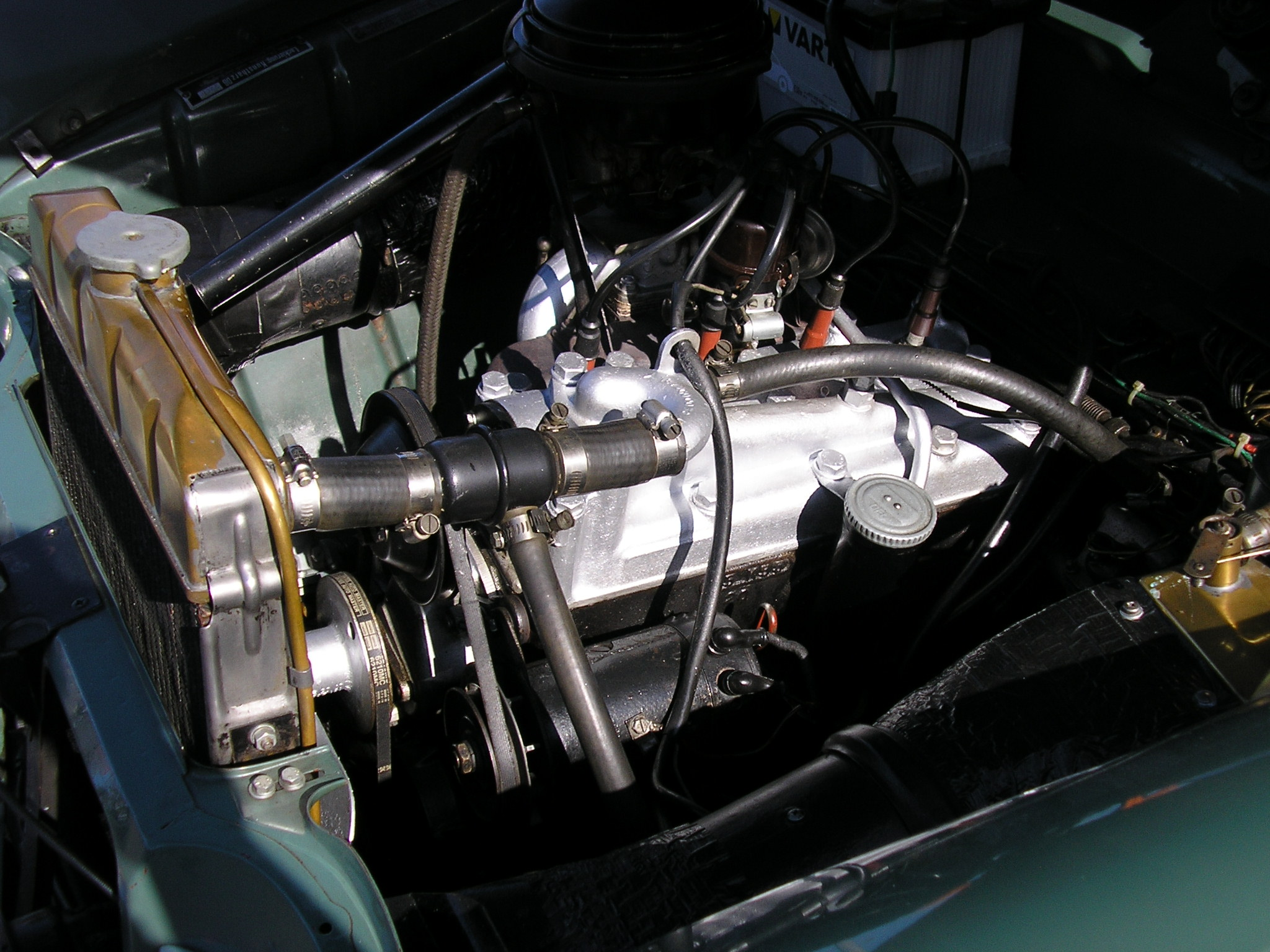

Overview
- Manufacturer: Daimler-Benz
- Production: 1935–1955

Layout
- Configuration: Inline 4
- Displacement: 1.7 L (1,697 cc) (1935-1950); 1.8 L (1,767 cc) (1950-1955)
- Cylinder bore: 73.5–75 mm (2.89–2.95 in)
- Piston stroke: 100 mm (3.94 in)
- Cylinder block material: Cast iron
- Cylinder head material: Aluminum
- Valvetrain: Side valve
- Compression ratio: 6.5:1

Combustion
- Fuel system: Solex carburetor
- Fuel type: Gasoline
- Cooling system: Water-cooled

Chronology
- Successor: Mercedes-Benz M121 engine

The Mercedes Benz M136 engine was a 1.7 L (1,697 cc) gasoline powered inline-four engine introduced by Mercedes-Benz in 1935 for its new W136 sedan. It was initially used in the W136 170 V.

It was enlarged to 1.8 L (1,767 cc) in 1950 and installed in the W191 170 S variants, and remained in production until 1955, when it was replaced by the 1.9-litre single overhead camshaft inline-4 M121.

== See also ==
- Mercedes-Benz M121 engine
- List of Mercedes-Benz engines
