= 190th =

190th may refer to:

== Military units ==
- 190th Air Refueling Wing (aka Kansas Coyotes), an aerial refueling unit located at Forbes Field, Kansas
- 190th Battalion (Winnipeg Rifles), CEF, a unit in the Canadian Expeditionary Force during the First World War
- 190th Fighter Squadron, a unit of the Idaho Air National Guard
- 190th (2nd Durham Light Infantry) Brigade, a home defence Territorial Force formation of the British Army during World War I

== Other uses ==
- 190th Street station, a station on the IND Eighth Avenue Line of the New York City Subway
- Fordham Road–190th Street station, an express station on the demolished IRT Third Avenue Line, New York

== See also ==
- 190 (number)
- AD 190, the year 190 (CXC) of the Julian calendar
- 190 BC
- July 9, 190th day of the year in a standard year
