= Alusil =

Aluminium-silicon alloy

Alusil as a hypereutectic aluminium-silicon alloy (EN AC-AlSi17Cu4Mg / EN AC-48100 or A390) contains approximately 78% aluminium and 17% silicon. This alloy was theoretically conceived in 1927 by Schweizer & Fehrenbach, of Badener Metall-Waren-Fabrik, but practically created only by Lancia in the same year, for its car engines. It was further developed by Reynolds, now Rheinmetall Automotive. In the United States, Chevrolet was the first to use Reynolds A390 in the Chevrolet Vega.

The Alusil aluminium alloy is commonly used to make linerless aluminium alloy engine blocks. There is no coating applied to the cylinder bore and blocks are not honed conventionally. During the manufacturing process, a chemical or mechanical process is used to remove aluminium from the surface of the cylinder bore, exposing a very hard silicon precipitate. These exposed silicon particles, which under a microscope look like small islands, allow for oil to collect in the area surrounding them, thus forming the required tribofilm that supports piston and ring travel.

The pistons used in an Alusil engine block typically have an iron-clad plating or similar coating on the piston skirts to prevent galling of the aluminium pistons when run against the uncoated aluminium cylinder bore. Examples of this coating include Mahle Ferrostan (I & II), FerroTec, or Ferroprint.

BMW switched from Nikasil-coated cylinder walls to Alusil in 1996 to eliminate the corrosion problems caused through the use of petrol/gasoline containing sulfur.

Although similar, Alusil is not to be mistaken with Lokasil which was used by Porsche in the Boxster, Cayman, and 911 models from 1997 through 2008. Lokasil blocks use a freeze-cast cylinder sleeve pre-form which is inserted into the casting mold. This preform contains silicon particles suspended in a resin binder. During the casting process, the molten aluminium is injected into the mold and burns off the resin, leaving an area of localized hypereutectic aluminium only in the area of the cylinder bore. The silicon particles are then mechanically exposed in a similar process to an Alusil block resulting in a cylinder block that functions in the same way as one cast out of Alusil.

Although successfully used by many European manufacturers, there are potentially issues associated with engines that use Alusil blocks, namely cylinder bore scoring which occurs when there is a breakdown of the exposed silicon particles in the cylinder bore, resulting in increased oil consumption and excessive piston noise.

Vehicles / Engines using Alusil include:

- Audi 2.4 V6
- Audi 4.2 MPI V8
- Audi 3.2 FSI V6
- Audi 4.2 FSI V8
- Audi 5.2 FSI V10
- Audi/Volkswagen 6.0 W12
- BMW N52 I6
- BMW M62 V8
- BMW S62 V8
- BMW N62 V8
- BMW N63 V8
- BMW M70/M73 V12
- BMW N74 V12
- BMW S65 & S85 M Engines
- Mercedes-Benz M112 engine V6
- Mercedes-Benz M113 engine V8
- Mercedes 420 SEL M116 V8
- Mercedes 560 SEL M117 V8
- Mercedes M119 V8
- Mercedes M120 V12
- Porsche M28 V8
- Porsche 924S I4
- Porsche 944 I4
- Porsche 968 I4
- Porsche Cayenne V6 (excluding models with VW VR6 engine which has a cast iron block)
- Porsche M48 V8 (excluding early naturally aspirated 4.5L M48.00, which uses Lokasil)
- Porsche Panamera V6
- Porsche MA1 H6
- Porsche Macan V6

== See also ==
- Hypereutectic piston
