= Monteverdi Tiara =

Overview
- Manufacturer: Monteverdi
- Production: 1982–1983; 3 made
- Assembly: Switzerland: Basel

Body and chassis
- Body style: 4-door saloon
- Layout: FR layout
- Related: Mercedes-Benz W126

Powertrain
- Engine: 3.8 L M116 V8; 5.0 L M117 V8

Dimensions
- Wheelbase: 3,070 mm (120.9 in)
- Length: 5,270 mm (207.5 in)
- Width: 1,820 mm (71.7 in)
- Height: 1,440 mm (56.7 in)
- Curb weight: 1,650–1,690 kg (3,638–3,726 lb)

The Monteverdi Tiara is a luxury sedan produced by Monteverdi from 1982 to 1983. It is based on the Mercedes-Benz W126 generation S Class, with the main changes being a redesigned front and rear end. Only 3 cars were built during its production run.

== Specifications ==
The basis of the Tiara was the long wheelbase version of the W126 Mercedes-Benz S-Class sedan. In the case of the Tiara, Monteverdi carried over the entire drivetrain, as well as the interior, including doors and glazing of the base vehicle. The external changes were limited to a redesign of the front and the rear and on independent bumpers.

=== Body ===
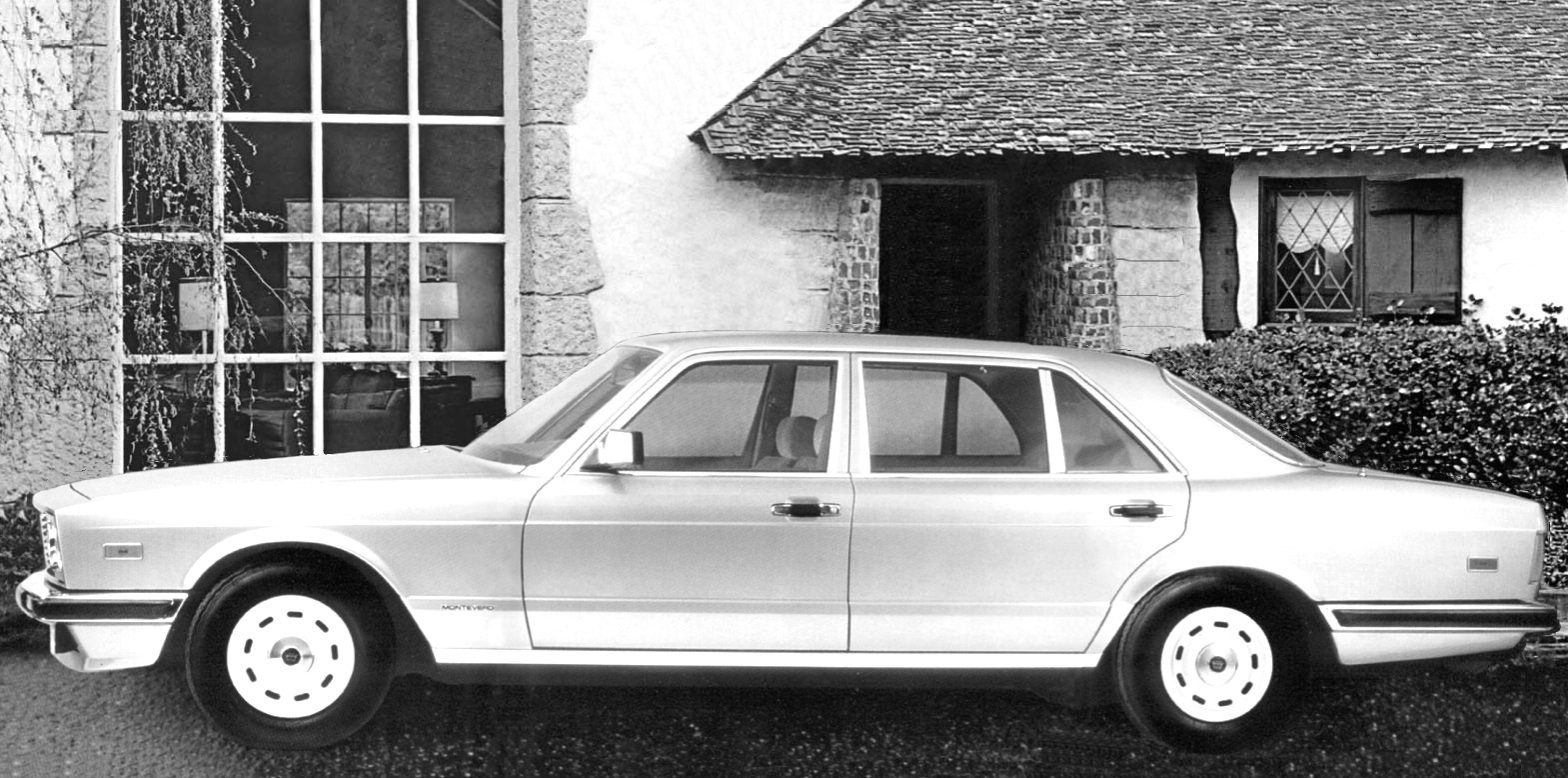
Tiara side view

Tiara headlights

The front end of the Tiara featured an angular design instead of the more streamlined design on the S Class. Monteverdi installed a vertical, heavily chrome-plated front grille with four round headlights. The grille was made of chrome-plated struts. The front fenders were also modified and the hood was redesigned to be smoother and smaller than the Mercedes-Benz. The shape of the headlights and their surrounds cited classic design elements of the High-375 series; however, some observers felt more reminiscent of the Alfa Romeo Alfetta of the third series. At the rear end, the line of the trunk was also designed more angular. The tail lights were the same ones from the Peugeot 505; in an attempt to create an association with the untrained observer to the recently presented Rolls-Royce Silver Spirit. The bumpers were also new. Instead of the large plastic units of the base vehicle, Monteverdi used very narrow bumpers, which were bordered in chrome and reached into the car flanks.

=== Engines ===
For the engine, Monteverdi used the two largest engines available in the S-Class, the 3.8-liter and 5.0-liter eight-cylinder engines. They were used unchanged, and produced 204 hp (152 kW) and 231 hp (172 kW) respectively.

=== Interior ===
Although Peter Monteverdi had largely designed the interior of the car himself in the case of the Sierra introduced in 1977, the interior in the Tiara was mostly unchanged from the one in the S Class. It did feature a new steering wheel that wore the Monteverdi emblem. The Tiara featured the complete range of equipment found in the S Class, including air conditioning and some of its state-of-the-art systems such as ABS and airbag; it could be supplemented by Monteverdi-typical attributes such as a television and voice recorder on request.

=== Price ===
The Monteverdi Tiara was offered in 1982 at a price of 172,000 Swiss francs. a year later, the base price was 187,000 Swiss francs, making the Tiara nearly three times as expensive as a Sierra and twice as expensive as a corresponding Mercedes-Benz S-Class.
