= Mercedes-Benz W108/W109 =

Motor vehicle from 1965

Mercedes-Benz W 108 • W 109
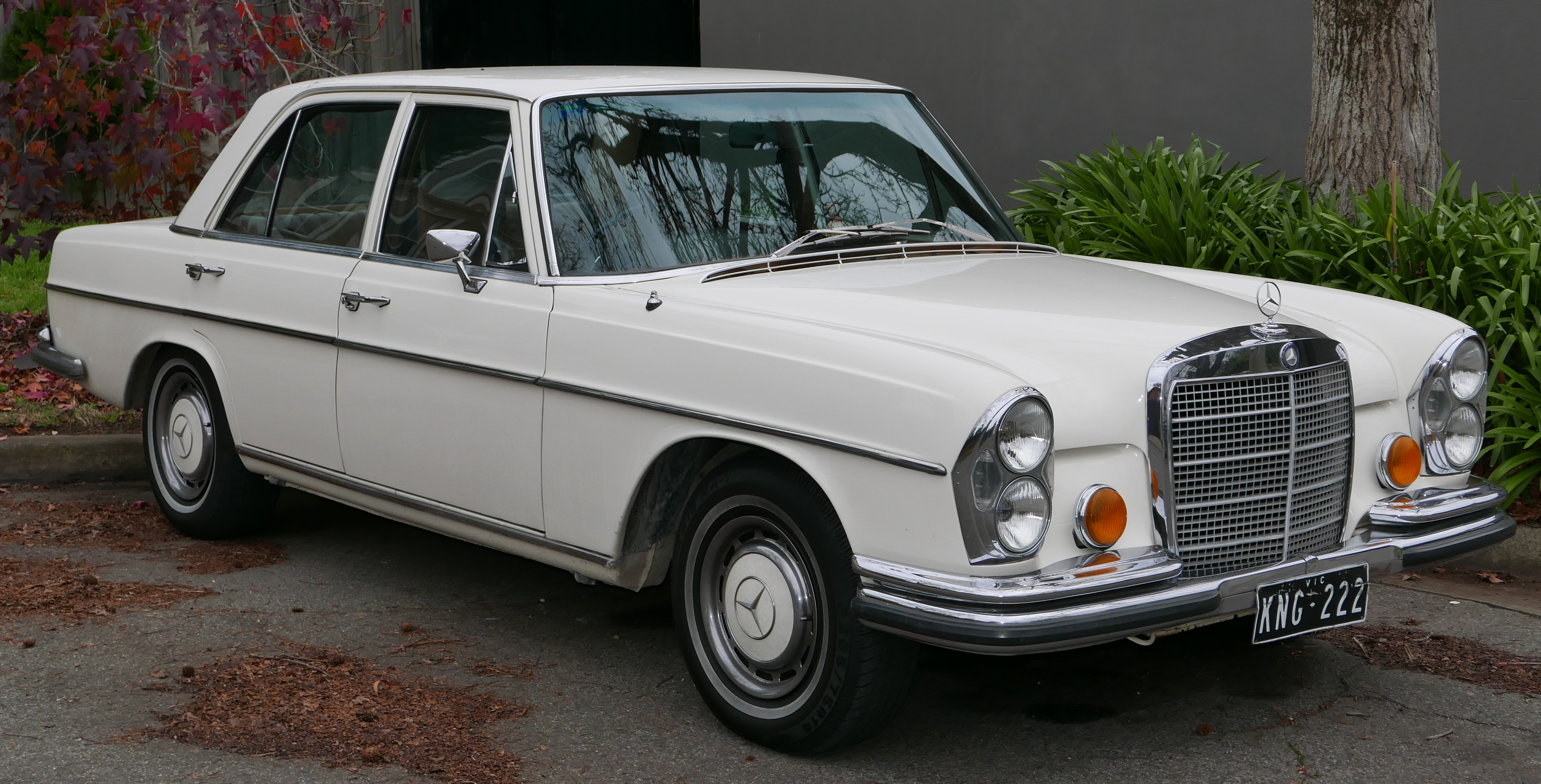

Overview
- Manufacturer: Daimler-Benz
- Production: September 1965 – November 1972; 383,072 built W 108: 359,522; W 109: 23,550
- Assembly: West Germany: Stuttgart
- Designer: Paul Bracq, Friedrich Geiger (1963)

Body and chassis
- Class: Full-size luxury car (F)
- Body style: 4-door saloon
- Layout: FR layout
- Related: W 113; W 111/W 112 (2-door models)

Powertrain
- Engine: 2.5 L M 108/129 I6; 2.8 L M 130 I6; 3.0 L M 189 I6; 3.5 L M 116 V8; 4.5 L M 117 V8; 6.3 L M 100 V8
- Transmission: 4-speed manual 5-speed manual 4-speed automatic K4A 025; K4B 050; K4C 025; K4A 040; 3-speed automatic W3A 040

Chronology
- Predecessor: W 108: W 111; W 109: W 112
- Successor: W 116

The Mercedes-Benz W 108 and W 109 are luxury cars produced by West German automaker Mercedes-Benz from 1965 through to 1972. They succeeded the W 111 and W 112 "fintail" (German: "Heckflosse") sedans, and upon their introduction, the manufacturer designated them as constituting a newly created "Upper Middle Class" range. The cars were successful in West Germany and in export markets including North America and Southeast Asia. During the seven-year run, a total of 383,072 units were manufactured.

As the W 108 and W 109 were only available as 4-door models, the similarly squarish, Paul Bracq-designed 2-door W 111 and W 112 coupés and cabriolets filled those niches and are frequently mistaken for W 108/W 109 two-doors.

== Model description ==
=== Development and body design ===
The car's predecessors, the four door W 111 (1959–65) and W 112 (1961–65), helped Mercedes-Benz develop better sales and achieve economy of scale production by unifying the entire Mercedes-Benz range onto a single automobile platform and body, reducing both manufacture time and cost. However, their signature tailfin design on rear fenders, a popular styling feature of the late 1950s quickly went out of fashion in favour of simplicity and practicality (particularly with regard to manufacture and bodyshop repair). After taking over the design school at Mercedes-Benz in 1957, Paul Bracq began steering the styling away from flamboyance to a stronger emphasis on function. The two-door W111 and W112 models introduced in 1961 were the first to show this approach, which saw the fins drastically rounded off. They were, in turn, followed by the W113 Pagoda and the W100 Größer with perfectly square rear fenders. Work on the replacement for the sedan Fintail body began in parallel, and by 1963 the design was finalised. Retaining the W111/W112 platform and underpinnings, the goal was to maximise passenger space while maintaining the favourably compact exterior dimensions of the previous six-cylinder models, to achieve high levels of safety, ride comfort, and performance. In addition, the top-end W112 sedans had very limited demand, looking too similar to the mass-produced downscale four-cylinder W110 (the diesel versions of which were common as taxicabs) - thus the upcoming new sedans should not share underpinnings with lower-tiered models.

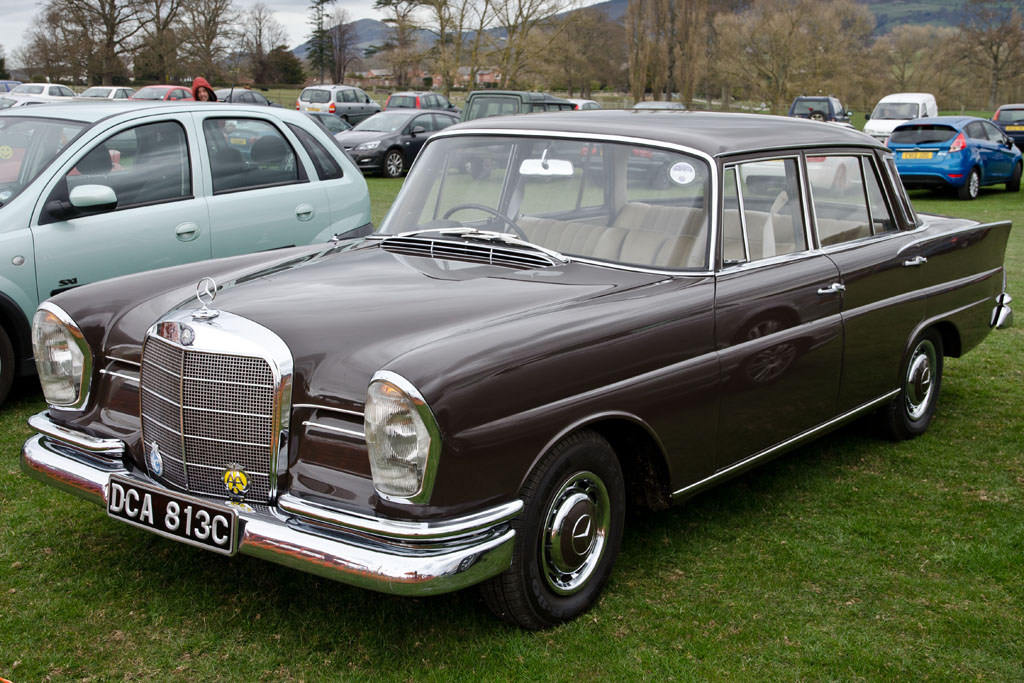
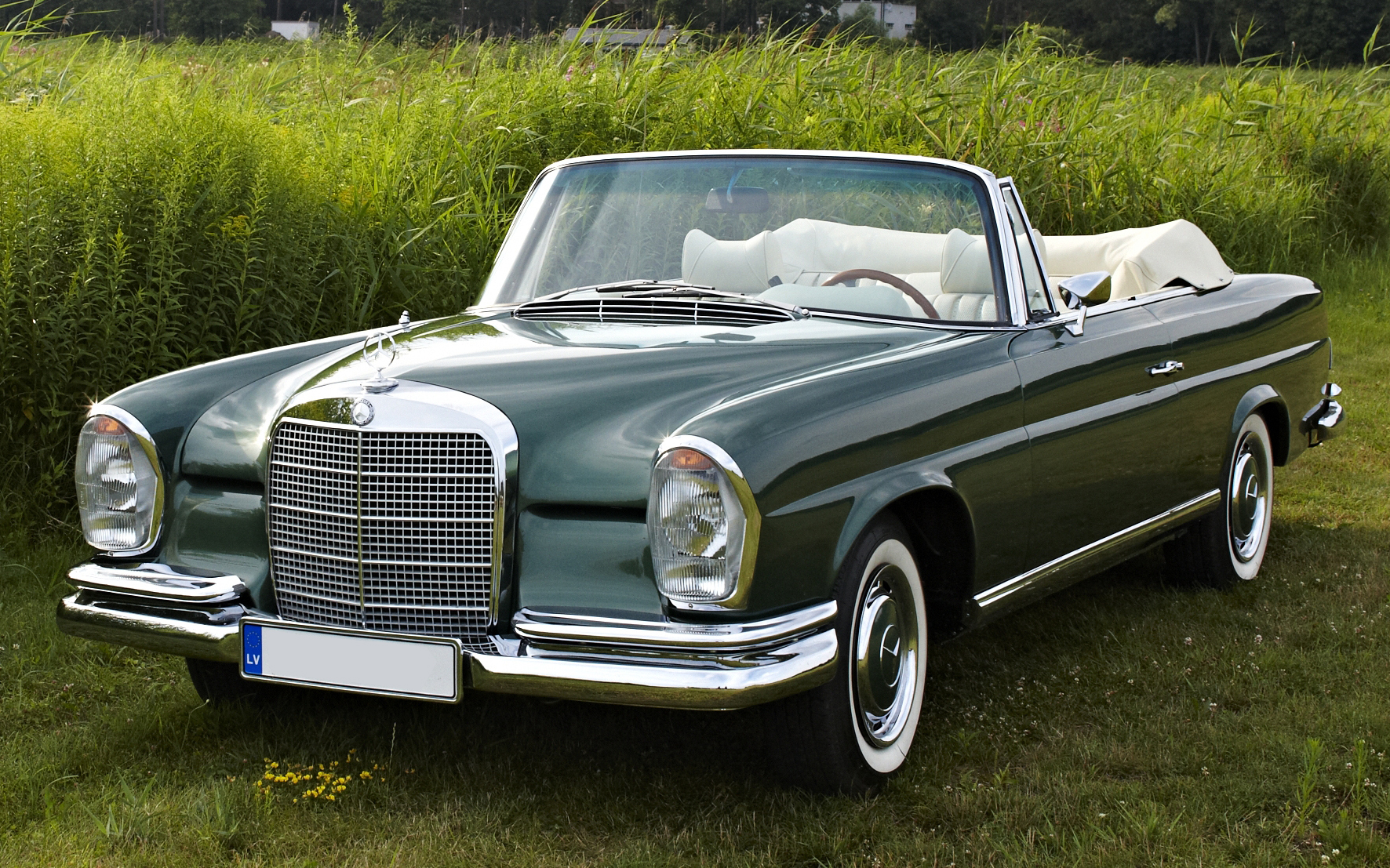
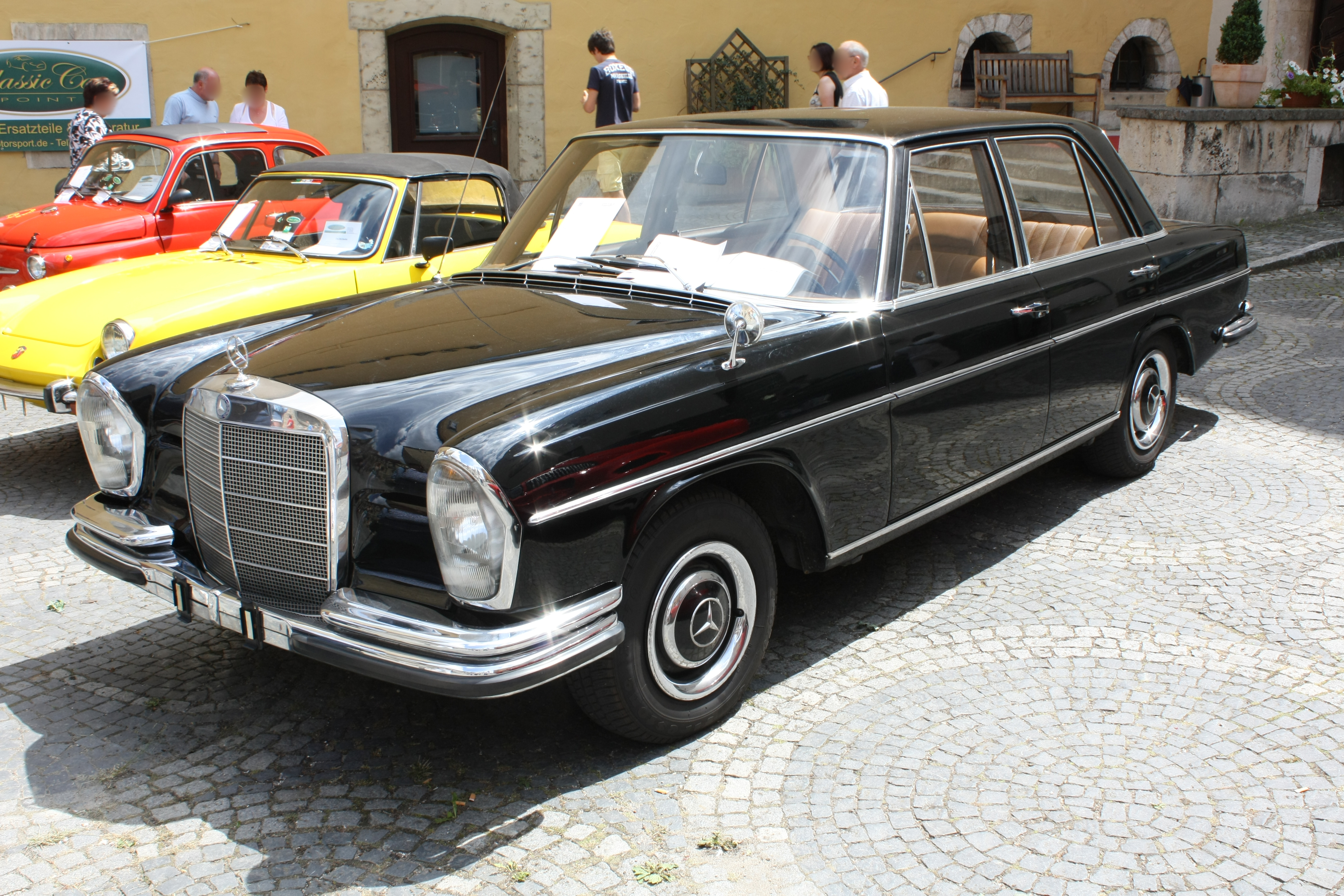
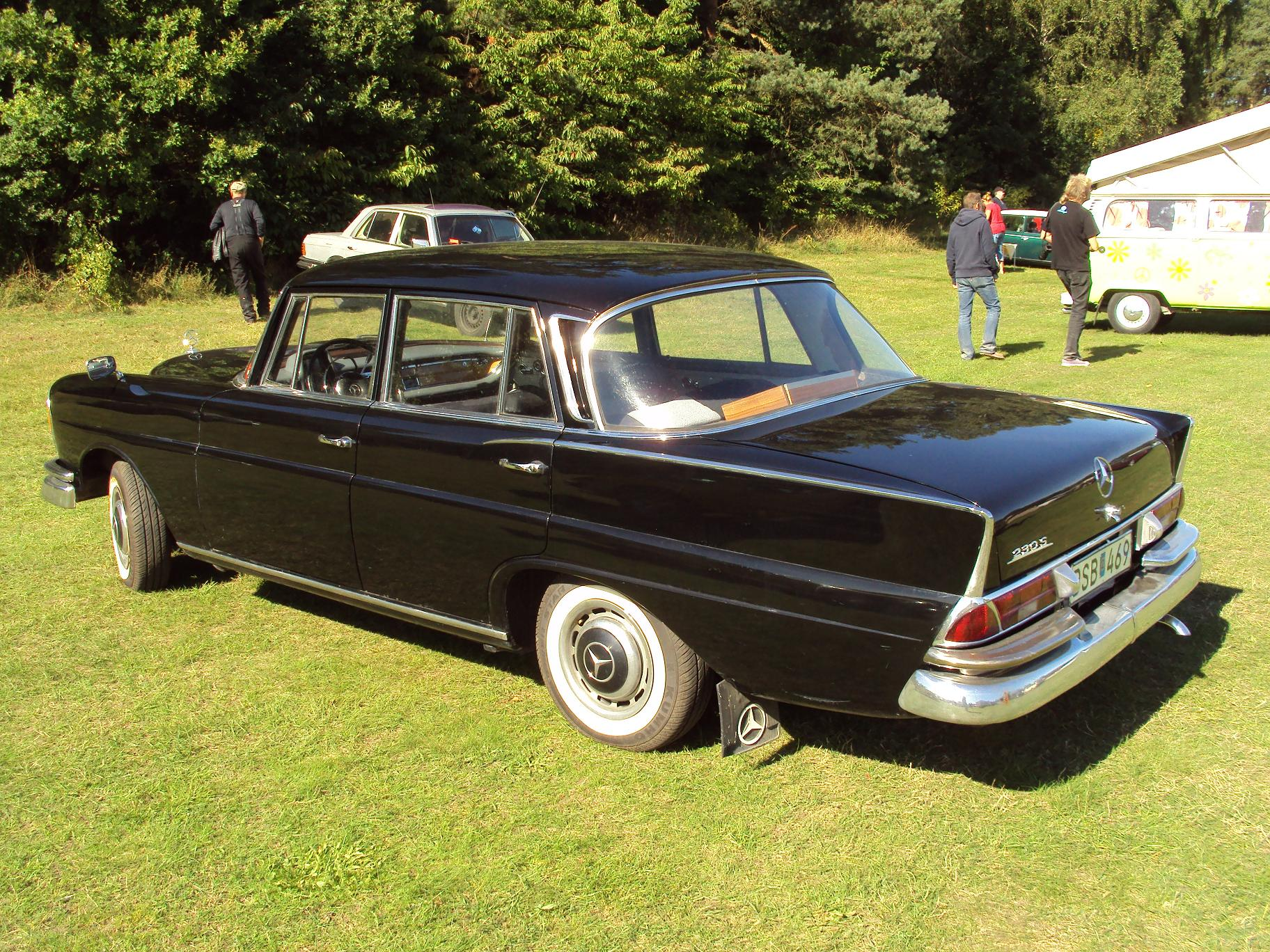
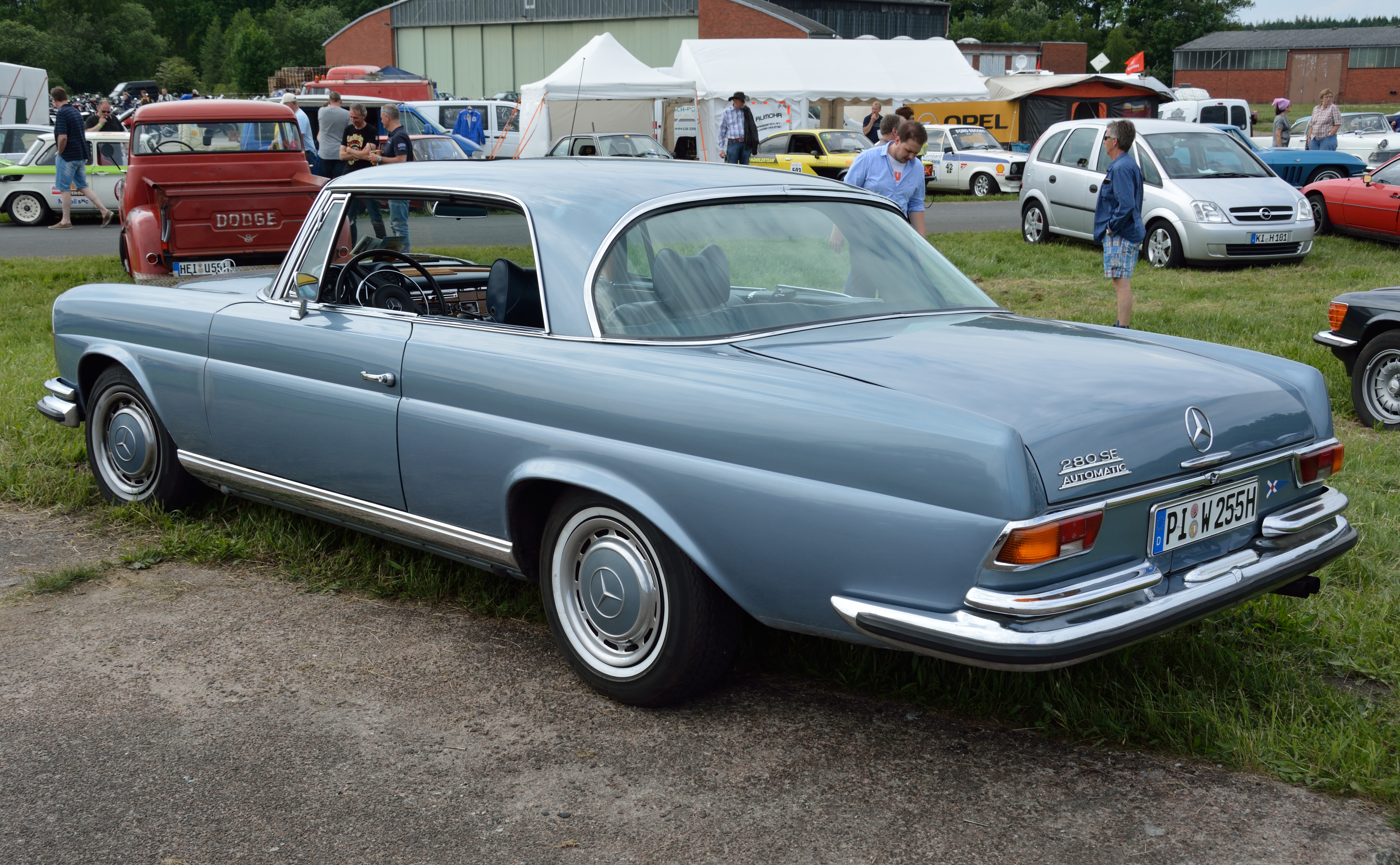
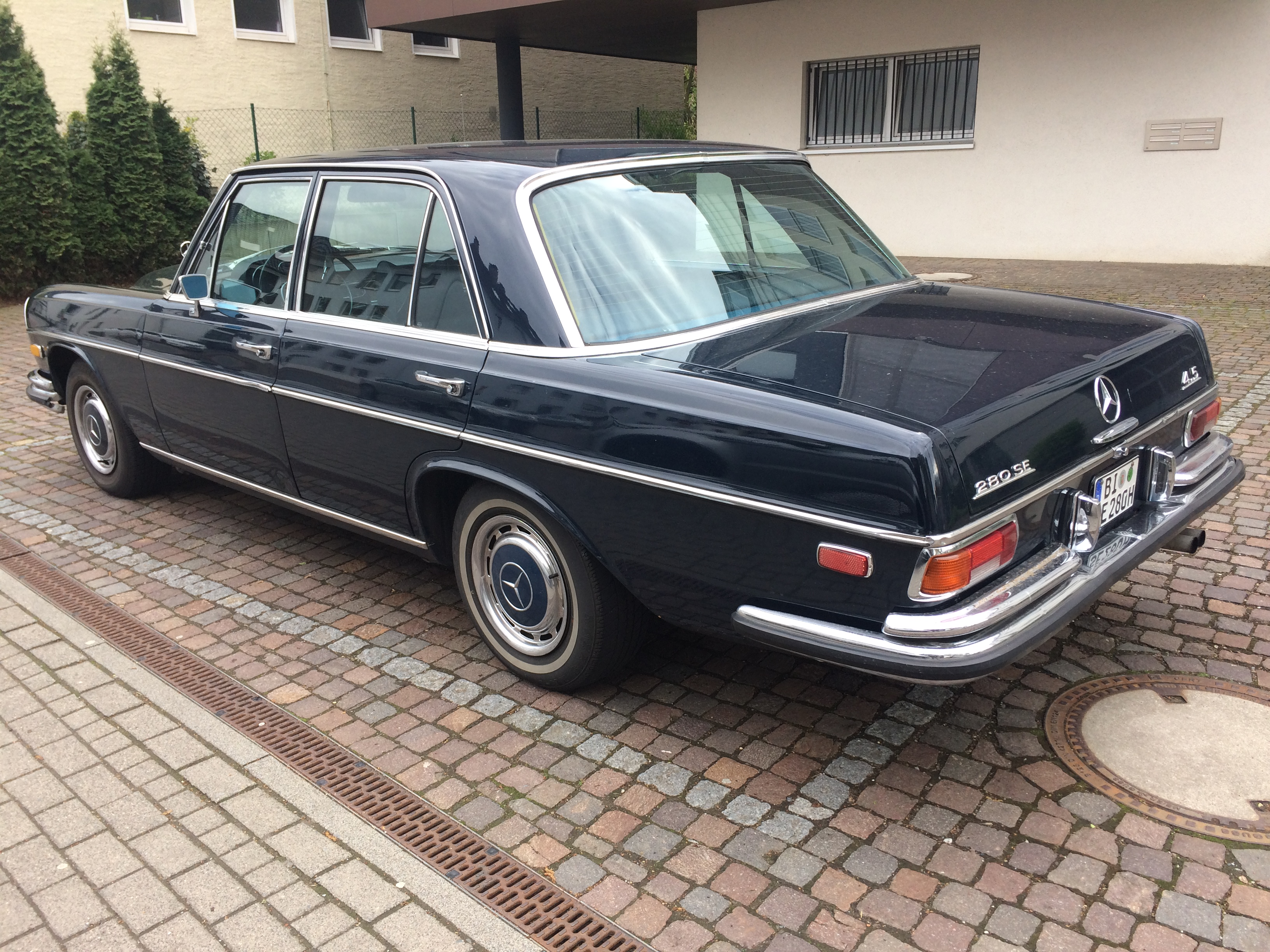
The 1959 W111 sedan on the left was designed by Karl Wilfert when Daimler was still following international fashion trends. The fascia shows an evolution of the Ponton look with the Lichteinheiten cells from the 300SL roadster. The sides demonstrate hints of Italian elegance from Battista Pininfarina, while the rear was heavily influenced by the American tailfins and the abundance of Chrome, owning to the works of Harley Earl and Virgil Exner. The fintail sedans would be produced from 1959 until 1968, and up until 1965 was the premium vehicle of Mercedes-Benz.

Paul Bracq joined Daimler AG in 1957. Sensing a forthcoming radical change in car in the works of George W. Walker, Bill Mitchell and Elwood Engel, Bracq sought to create a fully indigenous look for Mercedes-Benz. The first result was the two door coupe and cabriolet W111 in the centre images. The cleaner silhouette allowed Mercedes-Benz to keep the car in production for a whole decade (1961 to 1971) and continue to companion the W108/W109 sedans.
After the warm reception of the two-door models, and the squarish W113 Pagoda roadster and the W100 Größer limousine which followed, Bracq set to work on the top Mercedes sedan models, creating a timeless, elegant, light, and functional greenhouse design of the W108/W109 on the right.

Despite their divergent design philosophies across six years, all three vehicles used an identical platform, underpinnings and would share the available powertrains.

While the external dimensions were increased only marginally relative to the preceding Type 220 S — 25 mm (1.0 in) longer, 15 mm (0.6 in) wider, and 60 mm (2.4 in) lower — the interior space efficiency was significantly improved, primarily by dint of curved side windows and a lowered beltline. As a result, interior width increased by 70 mm (2.8 in) in the rear seating area, and by 90 mm (3.5 in) in the front seating area. The floor in front of the rear seats was lowered by 20 mm (0.8 in), resulting in increased footwell space. The vehicle's centre of gravity was lowered, improving road-holding. The lowered beltline facilitated larger window areas; the windscreen alone was 17 per cent larger than that of the W 111, with total glass area increasing by 12 per cent. The result was a newer-looking, sleeker car with an open and spacious interior. As intended, the flat roof and smooth rear end treatment were stylistically reminiscent of the W111 coupés, W113 roadster and W100 limousine whose sporty and elegant design had garnered worldwide acclaim. The front featured the traditional Mercedes-Benz radiator grille with a wide opening and lowered bonnet and vertical Lichteinheiten lighting units which combined high and low beam headlamps, parking and turn signal lights, and fog lamps into a single, integrated assembly (though U.S. export models used round sealed beam headlamps and separate park/turn lamps in accord with national regulations).

=== Body construction and paintwork ===
The body was welded to the chassis floor plate to form a single, torsionally-resistant unit. Vulnerable areas received a seven-layer paint finish consisting of zinc phosphate anti-rust treatment, chromic acid neutralisation, two primer coats, a stone-chip protection coat, undercoat, and topcoat, baked at 130–165 °C (266–329 °F). The underside, inner fenders, door sills, and front valance were given a thick protective coating of polyvinyl chloride (PVC) weighing approximately 14 kg, which remained elastic to prevent stone damage and provide sound insulation. The engine compartment and underside components were sprayed with a wax coating. Chrome-plated exterior trim comprised five layers over steel: matte copper, polished copper, semi-matte nickel, polished nickel, and a double heavy chrome layer.

=== Interior design and comfort ===
The seats were developed in collaboration with medical doctors, using firm cushioning to allow small posture changes and prevent the body from bouncing. The backrest followed the S-shaped curve of the spine, and the bucket-shaped design provided lateral support. The driver's seat offered three-way adjustment: fore-aft, vertical height, and infinitely adjustable backrest angle down to horizontal. Multi-layer insulation separated the engine compartment from the cabin: 18 mm at the bulkhead and over 20 mm on sections of the floor. Ventilation air passed through a dust filter; a three-speed blower operated even when stationary. Air was extracted through slots under the rear window, helping to reduce condensation. Heating was independently adjustable for left and right sides. Luggage capacity was 610 litres. Optional extras included an electrically operated sunroof, electric window lifts, power steering, and air conditioning. Twin high-pitched horns were standard; a third horn was fitted to the later 300 SEL 6.3 and 300 SEL 3.5. From the 1968 model year the interior received new fabric patterns, revised colour schemes, and nylon carpet on the floor and sills.

=== Model differentiation: W 108 and W 109 ===
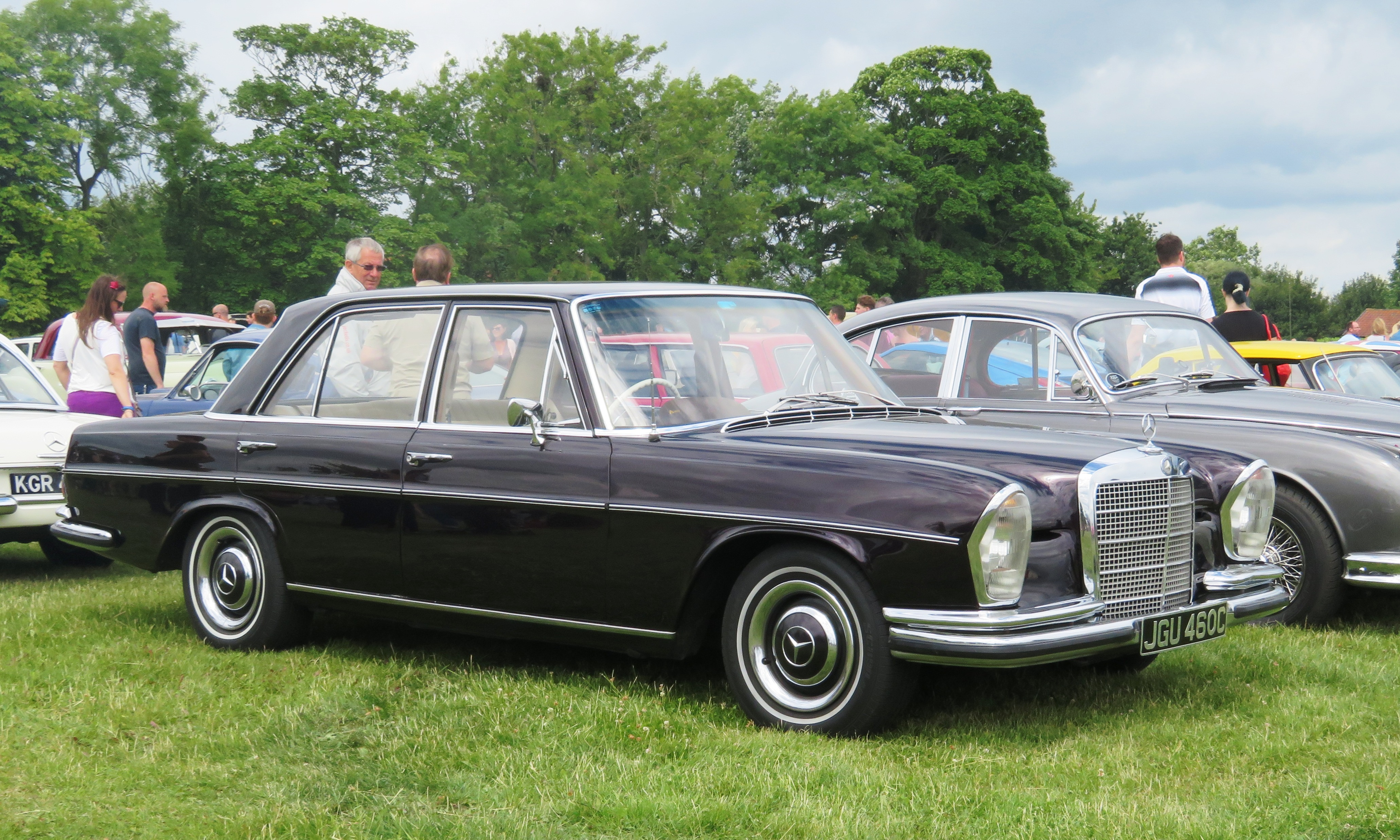

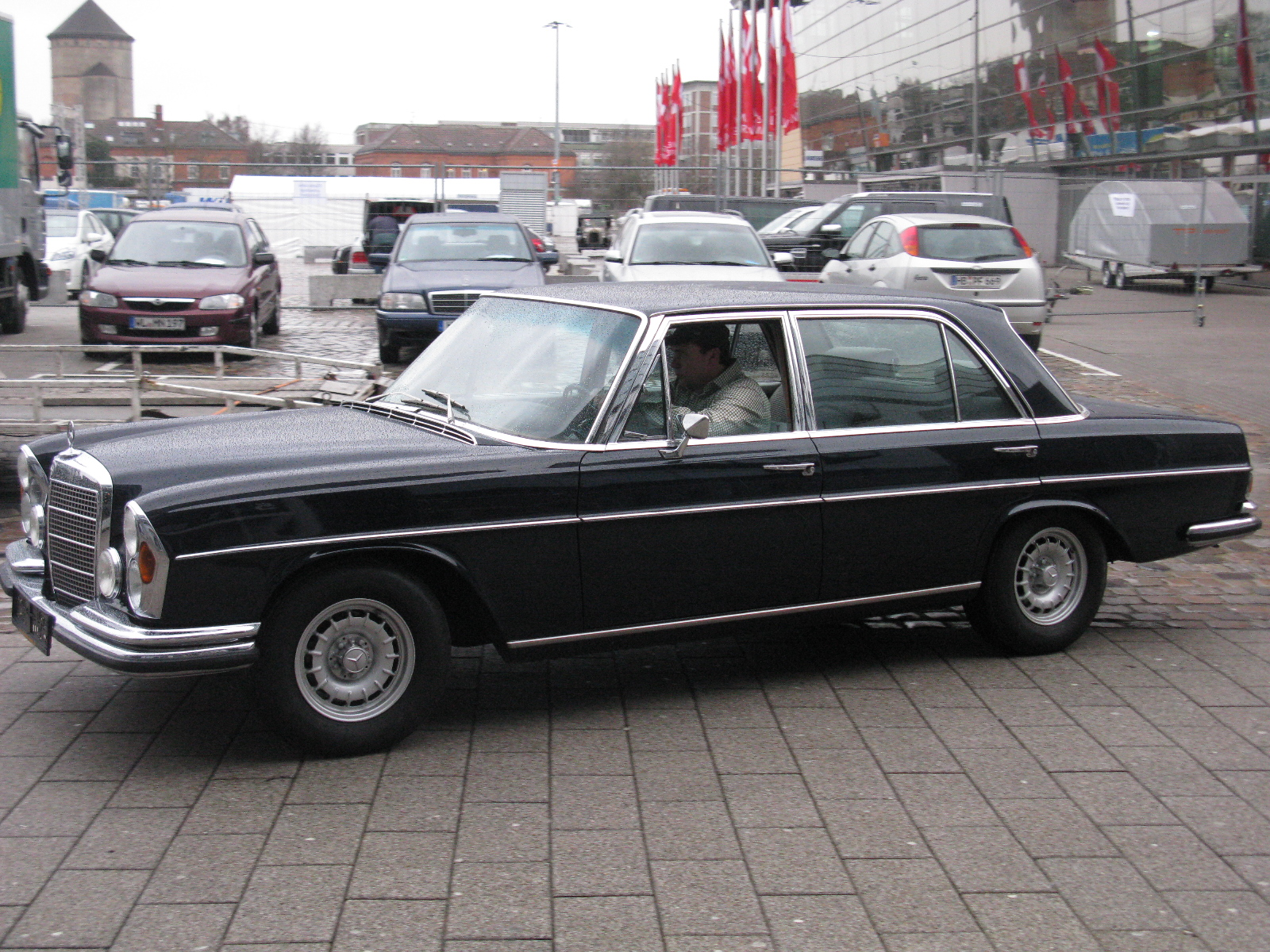
Visually W 109 models can be distinguished by the thick chrome strip on the A-pillar and the door frames surrounding the windows, along with the 300 SEL badge. Other pointers like engine, wheelbase, headlight arrangement would become intermixed between the two chassis codes.

Originally, the W 108 was seen as a combined successor to the W 111 and the short-wheelbase sedans in the W 112 line lacking air suspension. In turn, the W 111 was a successor to the six-cylinder Ponton models of the mid-1950s; whilst the W 112, derived from it, was a stopgap to replace the hand-built body-on-frame 300 "Adenauer" (W 189) state car pending the 1963 introduction of the 600 "Grand Mercedes" (W 100; German: "Größer Mercedes"). In addition to being lavishly decorated with additional chrome trim, the W 112 inherited the alloy block M 189 engine of the W 189, and featured a self-levelling air suspension.

The dividing line between the W 108 and W 109 ran between luxury, performance, and air suspension. The W 109 300 SEL kept the self-levelling air suspension, while the W 108 models from the 300 SEb down retained steel coil springs and a hydropneumatic compensating spring on the rear axle. (A double-acting hydraulic device that used the movements of the swing axle halves to maintain a nearly constant ride height regardless of load). The 300 series were more luxuriously appointed than the 250 series, featuring burled walnut dashboards and fine wood trim. Externally all W 109 models could be distinguished by their door window frames and A-pillars finished with polished metal bright trim. Many optional appointments for the W108 such as power windows, power steering and automatic transmission were standard on the W109, though a fully synchronised manual transmission discount option was available for the latter. Later 3.5 and 6.3 models had a vacuum-controlled central locking system as standard.

=== Chassis and steering ===
The front suspension employed a U-profile pressed front axle carrier with double wishbones on each side, separating wheel guidance from springing. Coil springs, gas-filled telescopic shock absorbers, and progressive bump stops were used. A front anti-roll bar was standard; whilst the 300SEL featured an additional rear anti-roll bar. The rear suspension was a single-joint swing axle with a low pivot point; gas-filled shock absorbers prevented oil foaming. The entire suspension was rubber-isolated from the body, and an additional shock absorber on engine mounts damped engine vibrations.

The power steering was a hydraulically assisted recirculating ball design. Below 600 grams of steering wheel force, steering was purely mechanical; above that, a control slide admitted pressurised oil. Road feel was retained, and if assistance failed the car remained fully steerable. The steering system featured a telescopic column, a deformable bushing under the steering wheel, and the steering housing mounted behind the front axle carrier for frontal collision safety.

=== Air suspension (W 109) ===
The W 109 300 SEL models were equipped as standard with Daimler-Benz air suspension, developed with Phoenix for the rubber rolling bellows and Bosch for the regulating valves. A compressor drew air through a frost-protection device and delivered it at 16 bar to a reservoir. Three level-control valves (two front, one rear) operated mechanically via rods from the suspension. The driver could select a "high" position via a dashboard switch, raising the body by approximately 5 cm (2.0 in). The system maintained constant ride height regardless of load, allowing a softer spring rate and optimal toe and camber adjustment.

=== Safety architecture ===
In the design of the new body by Béla Barényi the latest findings regarding internal and external occupant protection, based on intensive accident research conducted by Daimler-Benz AG, were incorporated. The structure adhered to the principle of a robust passenger safety cell combined with impact-absorbing crumple zones. The passenger compartment itself was engineered to be exceptionally robust and rigid, while the front and rear sections were designed to be relatively easily deformable to mitigate impact energy.

Internally, a comprehensive suite of passive safety measures was standardised across all models. The instrument panel was embedded within a shock-absorbing frame, and the steering wheel was equipped with a safety hub featuring a large, padded plate. The dashboard was effectively padded along both its top and bottom edges. All pull knobs and door handles were fabricated from elastic materials, and the doors were fitted with special safety locks designed to prevent them from springing open under any circumstances. For exterior protection against minor parking damage, rubber protective strips were integrated into the bumpers, and plastic strips were incorporated into the side trim mouldings.

All models had a dual-circuit power braking system with disc brakes on all four wheels. The parking brake was a small drum inside the rear disc hubs. A brake force regulating valve on the rear wheels allowed larger rear wheel cylinders for stability during light braking while preventing lock-up under heavy braking. The brake booster supplied approximately three-quarters of pedal pressure. From approximately 1969, the regulating valve was eliminated on the sedans in favour of a constant brake pressure distribution, research having shown it equally reliable for the sedan's weight distribution. On the W109 models the rear brake calipers were connected to the chassis via reaction arms to prevent rear-end lift during braking.

== First Series (1965–1967) ==
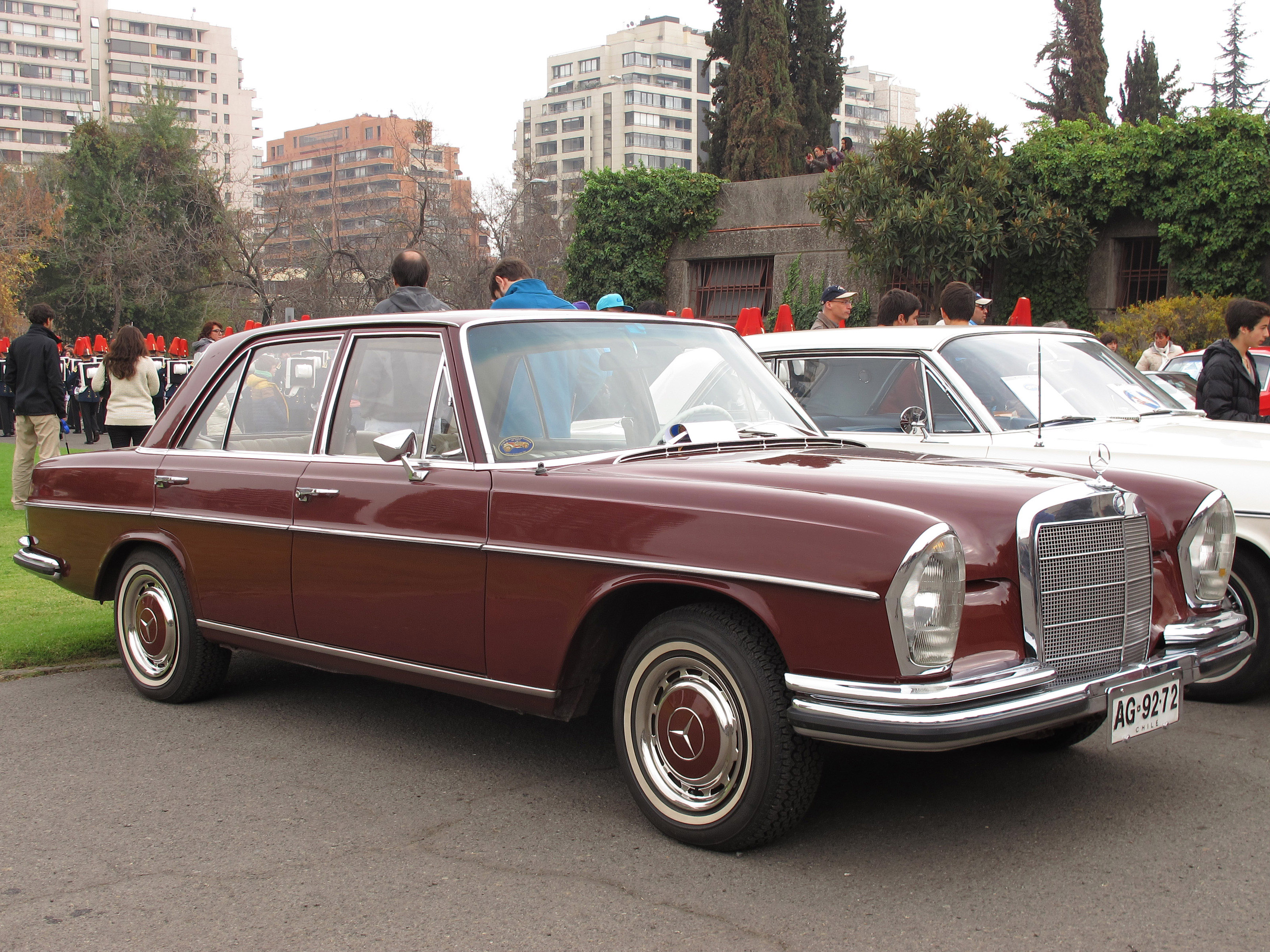
250SE

=== Market introduction ===
The W 108/W 109 premiered at the Frankfurt Auto Show in 1965. The initial model range consisted of three W 108s (250 S, 250 SE, and 300 SEb) and a sole W 109 (300 SEL). The inline-six engines were carried over from the previous generation with significant mechanical refinements. The 2.3 L M 127 engine was stroked to 2.5 L while the alloy-block 3.0 L M 189 version was carried over from the W 112.

These models were complemented by the W 111 250 SE coupe and cabriolets, which got the stroked M 129 motor, and the W 112 300 SE which retained the M 189 engine.

Whilst the W 108 and W 109 are seen as successors to the W 111 sedans in the segment they held in Mercedes-Benz lineup they did not replace them. The 4 door W 111 230 S, which was effectively the outgoing 220S with a bored out M180 engine will be produced alongside the 250 and 300 series until 1968. It will now share a new market among the newly organised W110 200/200D and 230/230 S series. This marked an important turning point in the separation of the product lines that would no longer be biased to engine displacement, and instead to the car body. Eventually their successors would become the E and S-Classes in summer of 1993.

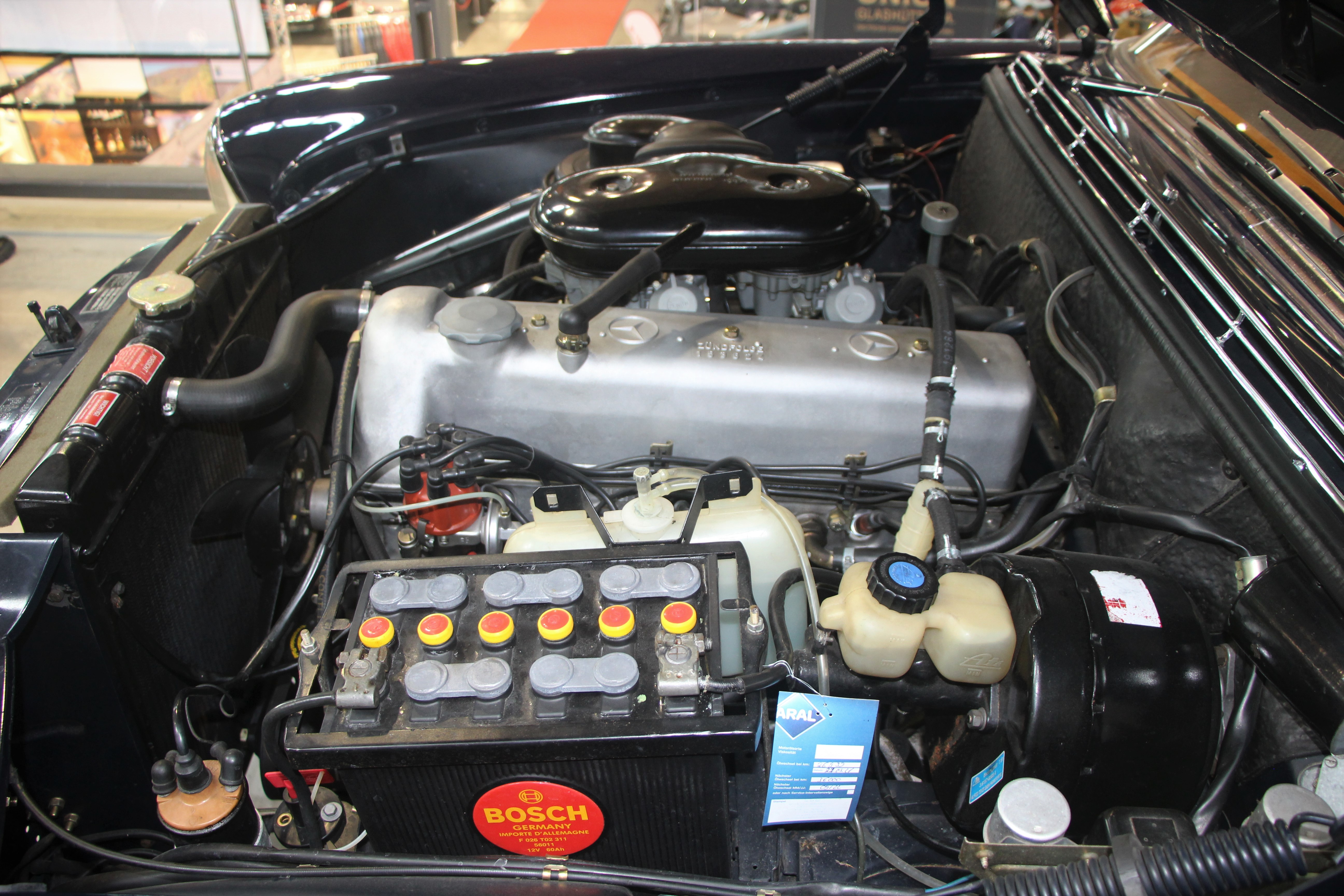
M108 engine under the bonnet of a 250S

=== 250 S and 250 SE models ===
The 250 S was fitted with a 2,497 cc (152.4 cu in) M 108 engine with 2 compound downdraft carburetors. A significant engineering advancement was the adoption of a seven-bearing design for the crankshaft, wherein a bearing was positioned before and after each crank throw. This resulted in considerably greater stiffness and smoother operation, capable of sustaining a maximum engine speed of 6,300 revolutions per minute. The compression ratio was also increased, and the cylinder head received enlarged intake and exhaust ports and valves. Cooling was managed by a standard-fit oil cooler and a viscous fan clutch, a coupling designed to engage automatically only when particularly large amounts of heat required dissipation, thereby saving engine power and reducing noise under normal operating conditions. Electrical supply was provided by a three-phase alternator fitted as standard, capable of supplying power to all consumers and charging the battery even at idle. The engine produced 130 PS (96 kW; 128 bhp) at 5,400 rpm. Top speed was approximately 180 km/h (112 mph).

The 250 SE had the same engine as the 250 S except for a mechanical fuel injection system utilising a Bosch 6-point mechanical fuel injection system with a six-plunger pump which calibrated the optimal fuel mixture automatically based on throttle pedal position and movement, engine speed, atmospheric pressure, water temperature, and driving conditions. Such engines received the M 129 designation. The increased engine output was 150 PS (110 kW; 148 bhp) at 5,500 rpm. The 250 SE was further distinguished by a standard dual exhaust system. Top speed was 190 km/h (118 mph).

=== 300 SE and 300 SEL models ===
Both the 300 SEb (standard wheelbase) and 300 SEL (long wheelbase, W 109) were fitted with the 2,996 cc (182.8 cu in) M 189 engine. This engine was an updated version of the M 186, originally developed for the 300 "Adenauer," also with a Bosch 6-point mechanical fuel injection, but featuring a light alloy cylinder block. The engine's output was 170 PS (125 kW; 168 bhp) at 5,400 rpm (DIN), with maximum torque rated at 25.4 kp⋅m (249 N⋅m; 184 lb⋅ft) at 4,000 rpm. With the standard rear axle ratio of 3.92:1 and automatic transmission, top speed was approximately 185 km/h (115 mph); with the optionally available "faster" rear axle ratio of 3.69:1 in conjunction with a manual transmission, a top speed of approximately 200 km/h (124 mph) was attainable.

Whereas the outgoing W 112 300 SE and its LWB namesake were mechanically identical, this approach was abandoned for the new models. Only the W 109 300 SEL was equipped as standard with air suspension described above, as well as power steering and the four-speed automatic transmission. A manual gearbox was available at a reduced price, and an optional limited-slip differential was offered. The W108 300SEb used standard coil spring suspension of the 250 series.

=== Production figures ===
The production figures for the first series from mid 1965 to start of 1968 (spring of 1969 for the 250S) showed 129,858 of 250 S/250 SE and 5,106 of 300 SEb/300 SEL. The very small production figure of 300 series reflected the higher sales price with luxurious appointments, exclusivity, and smaller global market share.

== 300 SEL 6.3 ==
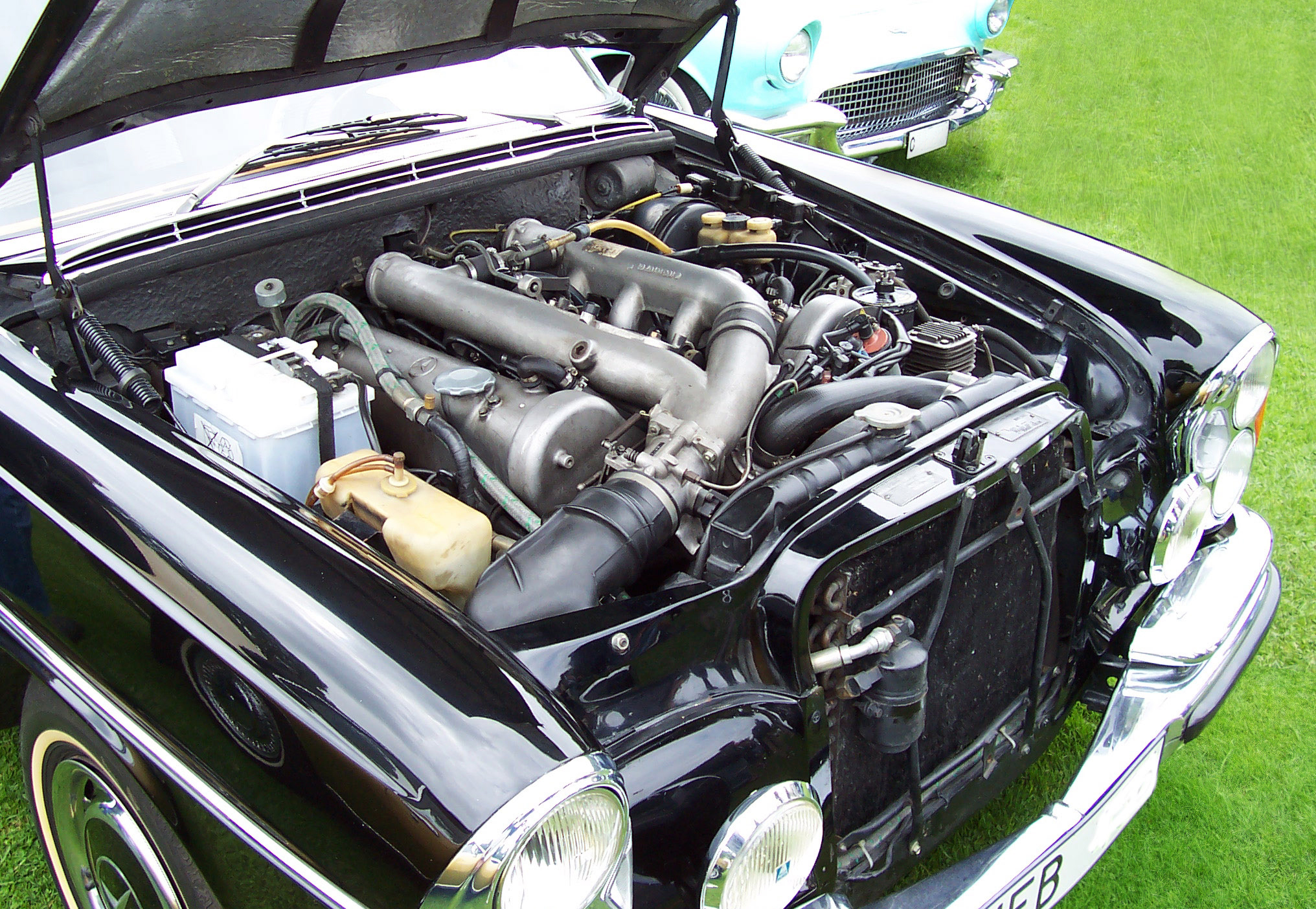
The massive M100 engine of the 300SEL 6.3

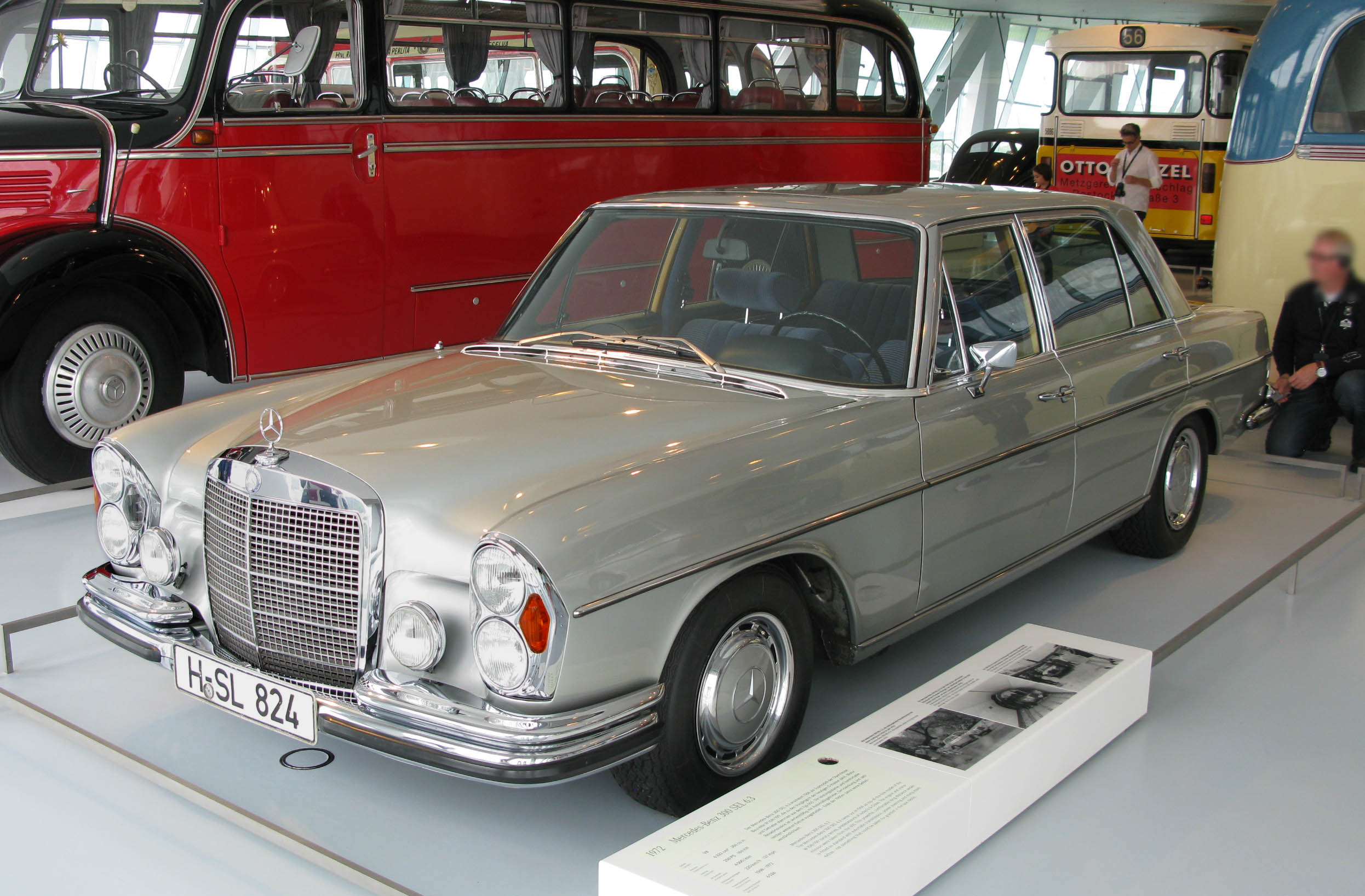
Outwardly, the W 109-based 6.3 was the first to use vertically paired headlights outside of North America. Originally this was a characteristic for US-exported models to comply with the DoT regulations on sealed beam lenses. The non-US models had a regular lamp with a halogen bulb. A third stand alone pair would occupy the space flanking the grille.

The 300 SEL 6.3 was created in 1966 when company engineer Erich Waxenberger transplanted the 6,333 cc (386.5 cu in) M 100 V8 from the 600 (W 100) into the W 109 chassis. Intended to bridge the gap between the 300 SEL and the 600, the result was the first Q-car from Mercedes-Benz. Full-scale production began in December 1967, and the model was presented at the Geneva Motor Show in March 1968 and at the British International Motor Show in October 1968. There are unconfirmed theories that the reason for the car's appearance was also out of necessity due to MB stocking a huge surplus of unused M100 castings, due to low sales of the very high price 600.

Daimler-Benz positioned the 300 SEL 6.3 as a long-distance limousine combining optimal comfort with superb performance, acknowledging that the sole criticism of the existing 300 SEL was for greater speed as its air-suspended chassis had the effect of making very fast driving feel comparatively sedate. The significance of the model lay in its acceleration: 0–100 km/h (62 mph) in 6.5 seconds and a standing kilometre in 27.1 seconds. The power-to-weight ratio was 6.95 kg/HP (DIN), equivalent to high-performance sports cars. Top speed was approximately 220 km/h (137 mph). Fuel consumption varied between 14 and 24 L/100 km, with a 105 L (27.7 US gal; 23.1 imp gal) tank including a 14-litre reserve.

The M 100 V8 engine, carried over from the 600 with only a few modifications, delivered 250 PS (184 kW; 247 hp) (DIN) at 4,000 rpm and 300 hp (224 kW; 304 PS) (SAE) at 4,100 rpm, with maximum torque of 51 kp⋅m (500 N⋅m; 369 lb⋅ft) at 2,800 rpm. The fuel injection system employed an eight-plunger injection pump with an automatic starting and warm-up unit, injecting fuel into the induction pipe via eight jets at a pressure of 213 psi (15 kg/cm^{2}). The standard four-speed automatic transmission with hydraulic clutch and three planetary gear sets was also carried over from the 600. Due to the size of the engine, the front axle had to be moved forward by 1.5 cm, further increasing the wheelbase. The rear axle was modified with a final drive ratio of 2.85. Braking system was enhanced with internally ventilated disc brakes on all four wheels, and the power steering required only slightly more than 2.5 turns from lock to lock. Super-low profile radial-ply tyres of size FR 70 VR 14 (205 VR 14 L) with tubes were fitted as standard.

The model was not the first to hide the true displacement of the engine, but the first to specify it separately with the "6.3" lettering on the right side of the boot lid. Externally the look was complemented with three halogen double headlamps in which the dipped and high-beam units were designed as a single assembly, providing longer range and consistent brightness. This headlamp frame design was derived from the US-specification versions to accommodate the sealed beam lenses, but now featured regular halogen bulbs. Initially exclusive to the 6.3, they would become optional on other models. The interior featured a speedometer with an extended range, a standard-fit tachometer, and a newly located clock. Standard luxury equipment included a vacuum-controlled central locking system, electrically operated side windows, and illuminated boot, glove compartment, ashtray, cigar lighter, and heater levers.

A total of 6,526 units were produced before the W 108/9 model range was discontinued in September 1972 to convert Sindelfingen assembly lines to the new Mercedes-Benz W116. In the assessment of its manufacturer, the combination of the M 100 engine, automatic transmission, and air suspension gave the 300 SEL 6.3 a position on the international market that was matched by no other automobile. Despite the Oil crisis of 1973-74, Mercedes even enlarged both car and engine for the 450 SEL 6.9 of 1975.

== Second Series (1968–1972) ==
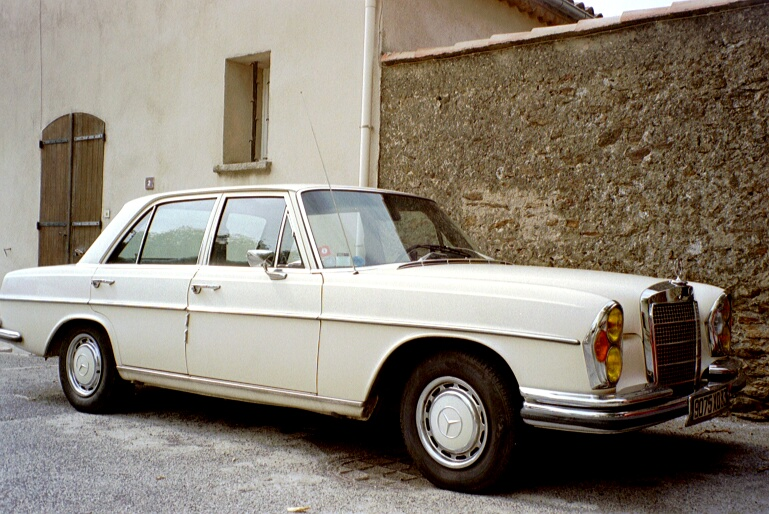
A W 108 in France with selective yellow headlights

=== Market introduction ===
In 1968, at the Brussels Motor Show in January for Europe and the Chicago Auto Show in February for the United States Mercedes-Benz unveiled the new executive W 114/W 115 "/8" (Stroke Eight); (German: "Strich-Acht") models. Also designed by Paul Bracq, they closely mimicked the W 108 and W 109 models, completing the marque's transition to its corporate style, which began with the two door W 111 models in 1961. Mechanically, however, they rode on chassis and platform of a clean-sheet design, and were slotted below the W 108 and W 109 models to replace the now archaic W 110 and W 111 Fintail sedans, labelled as the medium-class in official press-releases. Mercedes-Benz would embark on development of a new generation of the Upper class in parallel, but this project, originally envisioned in 1966, and finalised in 1969 but would not reach production until 1972. This meant that for the next five years Mercedes-Benz would be constantly releasing new models upon the availability of newer technology into the ageing vehicle to keep it competitive, despite still riding on a modified Ponton platform from the early 1950s, leading to a somewhat confusing nomenclature.

=== 2.8 L I6 models ===
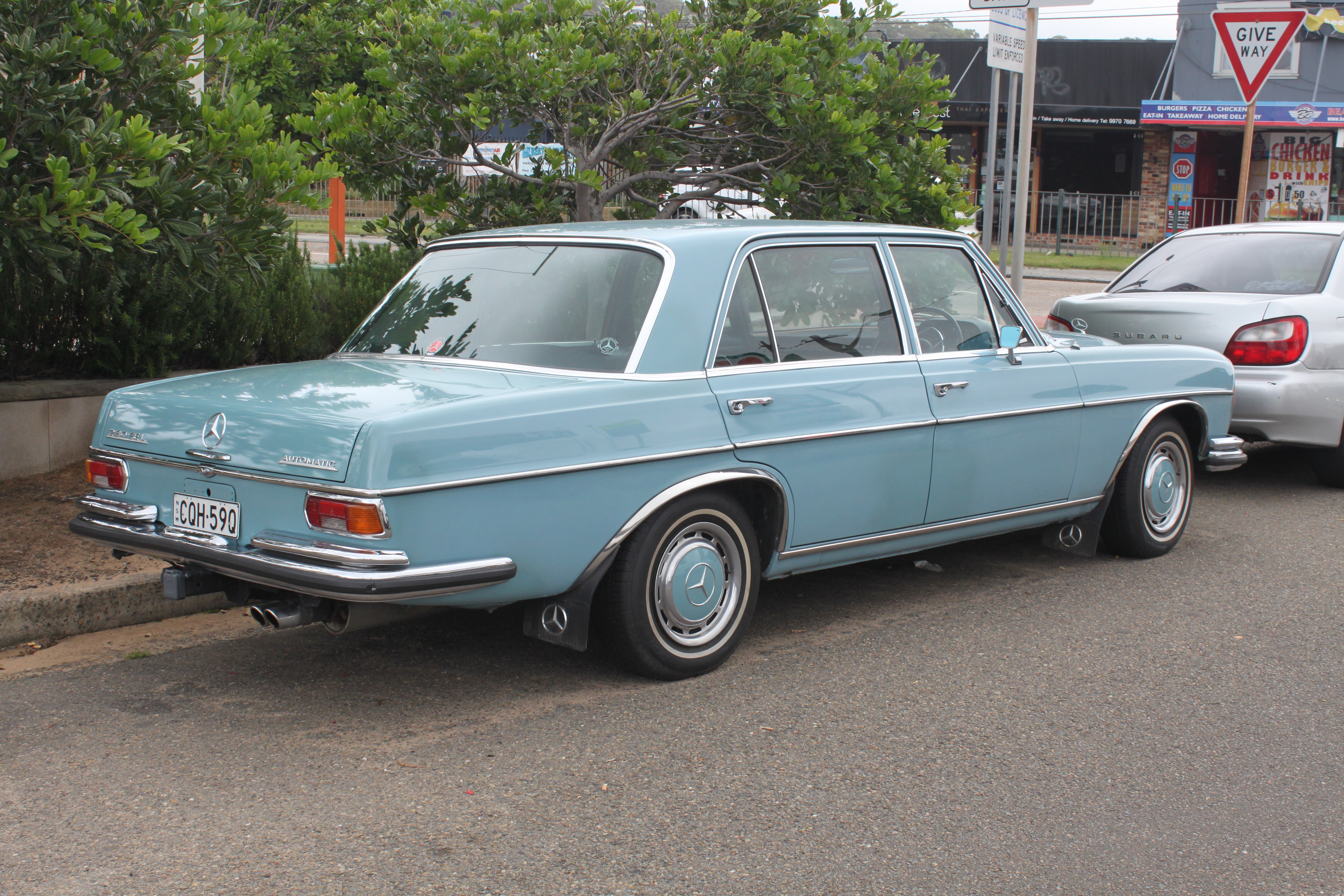
A long-wheelbase 280 SEL.

The inline six-cylinder engine range was revised for 1968. The 2.5 L M 108/M 129 engines of 1965 retained the asymmetrical cylinder spacing of the M 180/M 127 predecessors going back into the early 1950s. For further enlargement the cylinder axis had to evenly spaced allowing for the motor to be bored out to 2,778 cc (169.5 cu in). It was renamed as the M 130 for both carburetted and fuel-injected versions creating the 280 model series. The former on the 280 S, made 140 PS (103 kW; 138 bhp) (DIN) at 5,200 rpm (157 HP SAE at 5,400 rpm), whilst the latter on the 280 SE delivered 160 PS (118 kW; 158 bhp) (DIN) at 5,500 rpm (180 HP SAE at 5,750 rpm).

Internal improvements included molybdenum-treated piston rings for high wear resistance and extended engine lifespan even under sustained maximum load. An air-to-oil cooler replaced the previous oil-water heat exchanger, installed next to radiator as a single unit for more intensive cooling under hard driving conditions. A new camshaft with modified timing improved cylinder filling and torque delivery, particularly in the lower and mid-range engine speeds. Fuel-injected throttle body was now connected to the coolant circuit to prevent icing at low temperatures.

All manual transmission equipped engines now had a diaphragm clutch in place of the coil spring type, which was more resistant to high revolutions, had fewer wear parts and required lower pedal pressure. The clutch pedal travel was shortened and a spring in the slave cylinder automatically compensated for wear, eliminating the need for adjustment. Complementing it was an optional ZF supplied five-speed manual gearbox from May 1969.

Externally the new models were identical to their predecessors. The interior was redesigned with new fabric patterns, revised colour schemes, a durable nylon carpet lining the floor at the front, rear, and along the side sills.

Although the new M 130-equipped models were projected as replacements for the 250 S and 250 SE, production of the former 250 S would continue until March 1969, when the surplus cylinder block supply was exhausted. The 280 S and 280 SE would be produced until September 1972 totalling 184 717 vehicles. Complementing them until May 1971 would be the W 111 280 SE coupe and cabriolet, which too got the M 130 engine.

New to the lineup was a long wheelbase model, originally also badged as the 280 SE, but renamed as the 280 SEL in September 1969, offering the longer body of the W 109 but on a regular coil spring suspension and other standard chassis elements with more subtle appointments. Regarding the 300 series, the M 189 engine would be retired, and with it the swb W108 300 SEb. However, the pneumatic W 109 would continue production and will retain the 300 SEL badging, despite also having the M 130 motor. This engine, however, would feature the camshafts from the sporty 280 SL Pagoda, generating 170 PS (125 kW; 168 bhp) (DIN) at 5,750 rpm (195 HP SAE at 5,900 rpm). Production of both models, totalling just short of 11 thousand cars, sharing the identical engine and wheelbase, would be prematurely terminated in April 1971 and January 1970 respectively, to make the long bodies available for the V8 engines.

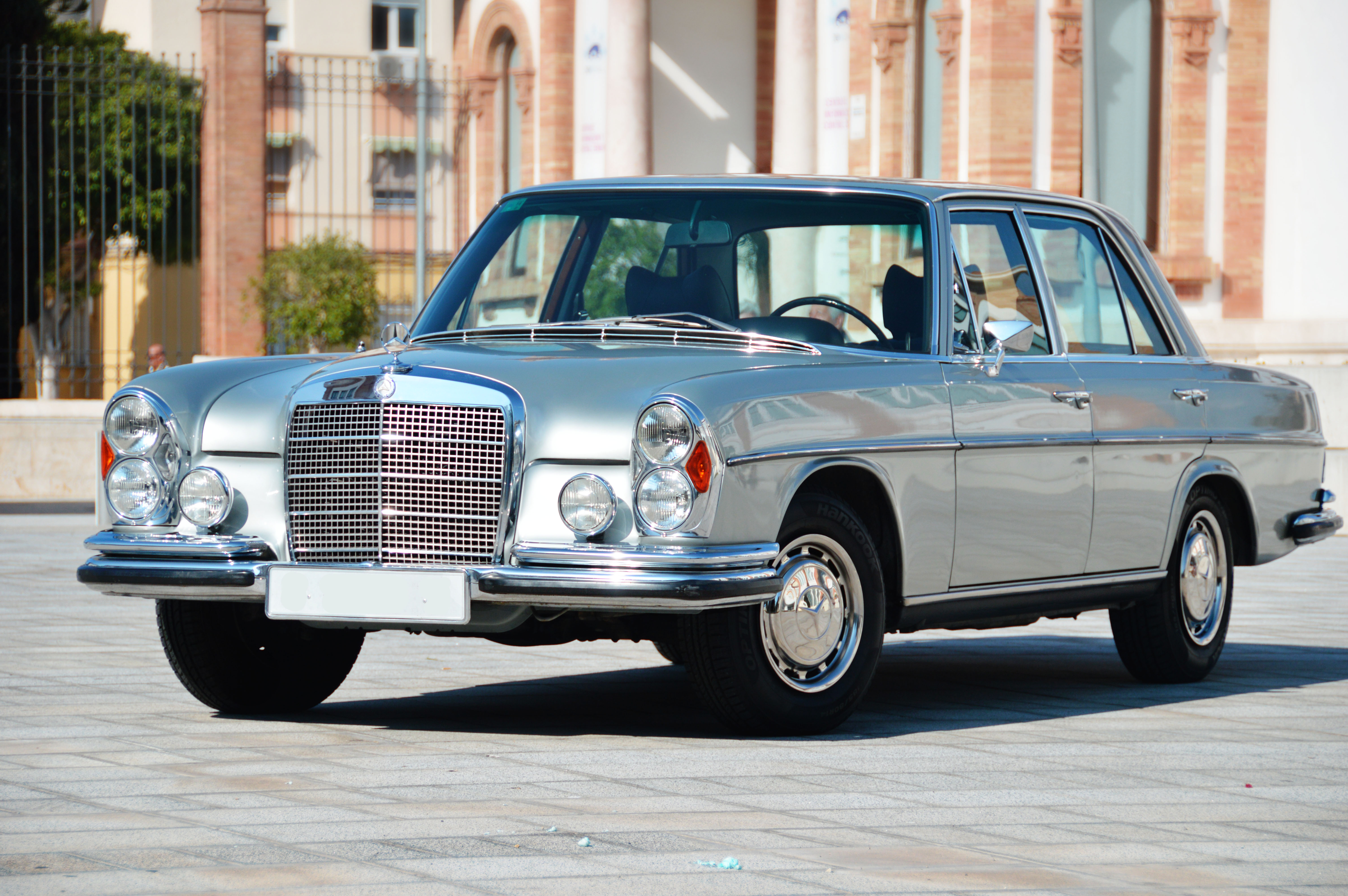
A W 108 280 SE from July 1972 with a standard straight-six engine

=== 3.5 L V8 models ===
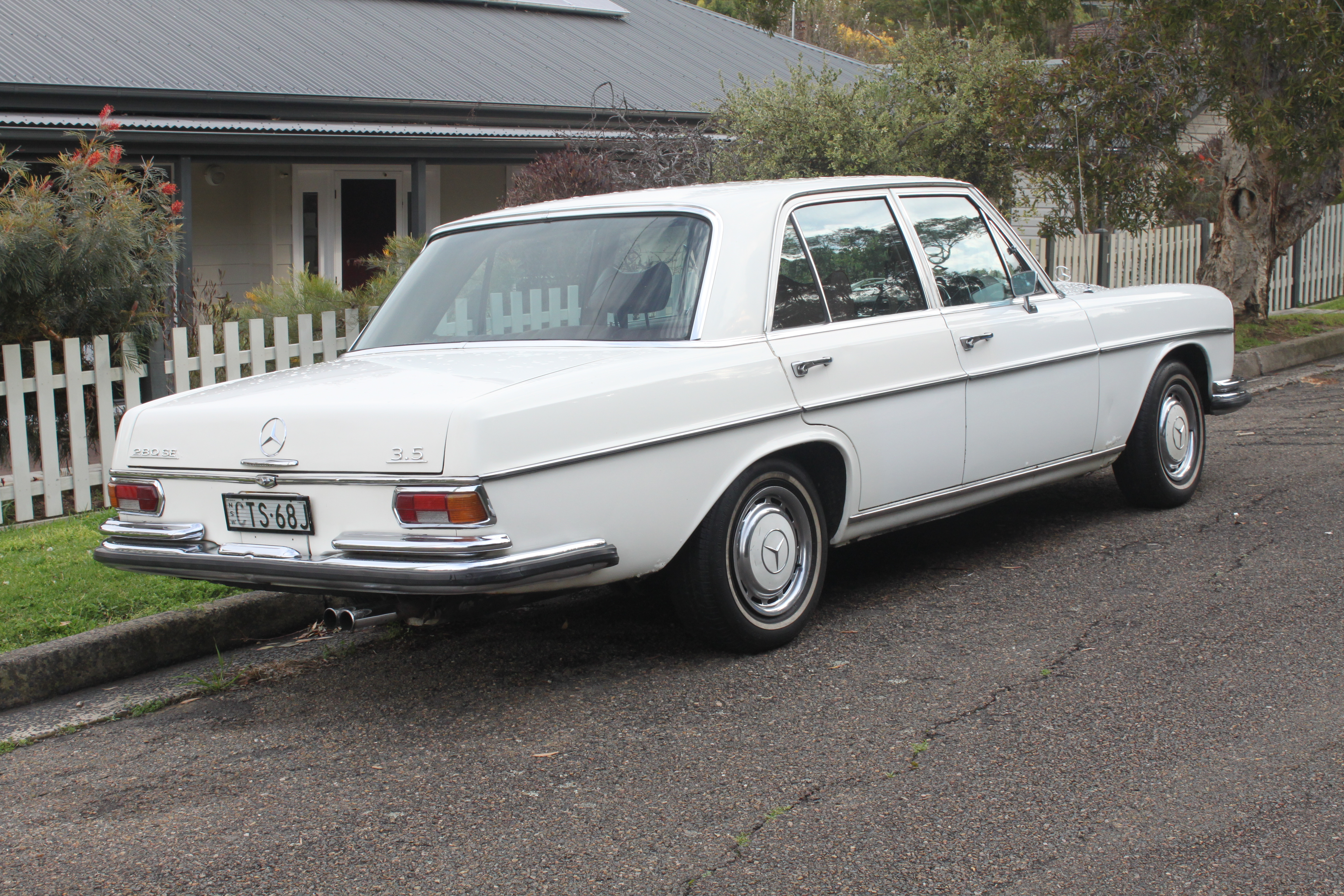
A 280SE 3.5 with the M116 V8 engine.

In 1963, following the debut of the M100 motor in the 600 Größer, Mercedes-Benz commenced with the development for the new generation of V8 engines for its executive range. Unlike the M100, which stressed the chassis to the limit and its extreme cost left it for a very specific clientele, the new 3.5 L M 116 motor was to become the primary engine for the next generation of cars, for both the US market and in Europe, as the motor was developed in anticipation of revision the German taxation law on displacement, which was published in May 1969 reducing the penalties on engines exceeding 2.7 litres.

The engine was a 90° V8 with grey cast iron block, light alloy heads, bore × stroke of 92 mm (3.62 in) × 65.8 mm (2.59 in) (stroke-to-bore ratio 0.715:1), and maximum engine speed of 6,500 rpm. The short-stroke design and placement of the intake manifolds between the cylinder banks made the V8 lower than the six-cylinder in-line engine. Weight was approximately 225 kg (496 lb), only 13–18 kg (29–40 lb) more than the M 130.

The M 116 featured forged and nitrided steel crankshaft with five 64 mm main bearings, molybdenum-coated pistons, cross-flow wedge combustion chambers with sodium-cooled exhaust valves, rotocap valve rotation joints and one overhead camshaft per bank driven by duplex chain with hydraulic tensioner. A major milestone was electronically controlled Bosch D-Jetronic fuel injection eliminating the mechanical injection pump and the large intake pipes. The electromagnetic injectors fired in four groups of two per one crankshaft revolution with a control unit that received inputs for intake manifold vacuum, engine speed, air temperature, coolant temperature, and throttle position; idle mixture adjustable via potentiometer. Transistorised ignition also made its introduction with the M116, such that contact breaker points carry only low control current, preventing their burning. Cooling included a visco-drive fan and thermostatically controlled electric auxiliary fan.

The engine was first fitted to the W 109 in August 1969 as the 300 SEL 3.5, presented at the Frankfurt Auto Show alongside the W 111 280 SE 3.5 Coupé and Convertible (whose fascia would be redesigned with a wider and lower grille). Output was 200 PS (147 kW; 197 bhp) (DIN) at 5,800 rpm (230 HP SAE at 6,050 rpm) with 29.25 kp⋅m (287 N⋅m; 212 lb⋅ft) of torque at 4,000 rpm. Acceleration from 0–100 km/h took 9.0 seconds. Standard equipment included the Mercedes-Benz four-speed automatic transmission (with three planetary gear sets giving in-gear maxima of 40, 88, and 148 km/h), air suspension, power steering, central locking, electric windows, and a three-tone horn. Top speed with the automatic was 205 km/h (127 mph); an optional manual gearbox raised it to 210 km/h (130 mph).

The successful debut of the 3.5 range, with over 10 000 cars sold in 1970 and with the release of the W116 still being delayed as the production of the M116 motor was entering its targeted output meant that at the AutoRAI in Amsterdam in February 1971 the 280 SE 3.5 and 280 SEL 3.5 were introduced, representing a hybrid vehicle of the W108 and the W109, where in addition to the mentioned motor and transmission (though it was manual gearbox standard, automatic was an option), the car also took the ventilated disk brakes, tyres and some of the many appointments that would be otherwise available at extra cost on the six cylinder 280 models.

The arrival of the 3.5 series (Mercedes-Benz reserved the "350" model badge for the next generation) also allowed Mercedes-Benz to make a progressive pricing of its model range. For all the complexity of the naming, by mid 1971 the customer would pay a 10% extra for fuel-injection of his base 280S, 30% more for the 3.5 V8, 40% if he wished to have it LWB, 80% more if he wished it on air suspension, whilst the flagship 6.3 would cost him 2.5 times. Despite their short production span, a total of 12 260 M116 powered W108s and a further 9 583 W109s of the 3.5 series will be produced until late summer of 1972.

=== 4.5 L V8 models ===
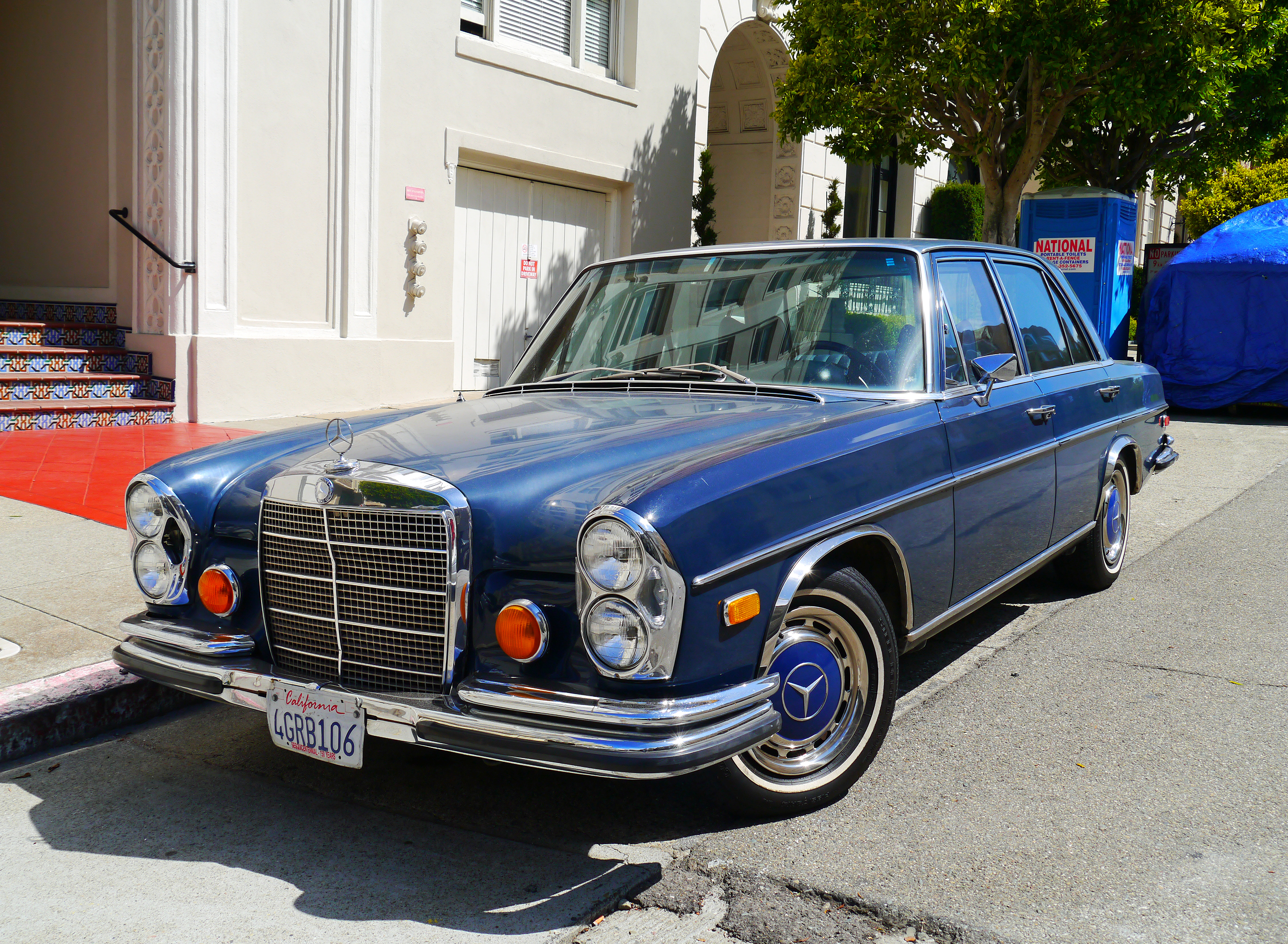
A 280SE 4.5 in San Francisco. Post-1968 US-spec models can be further identified by the additional indicator lights on the fenders.

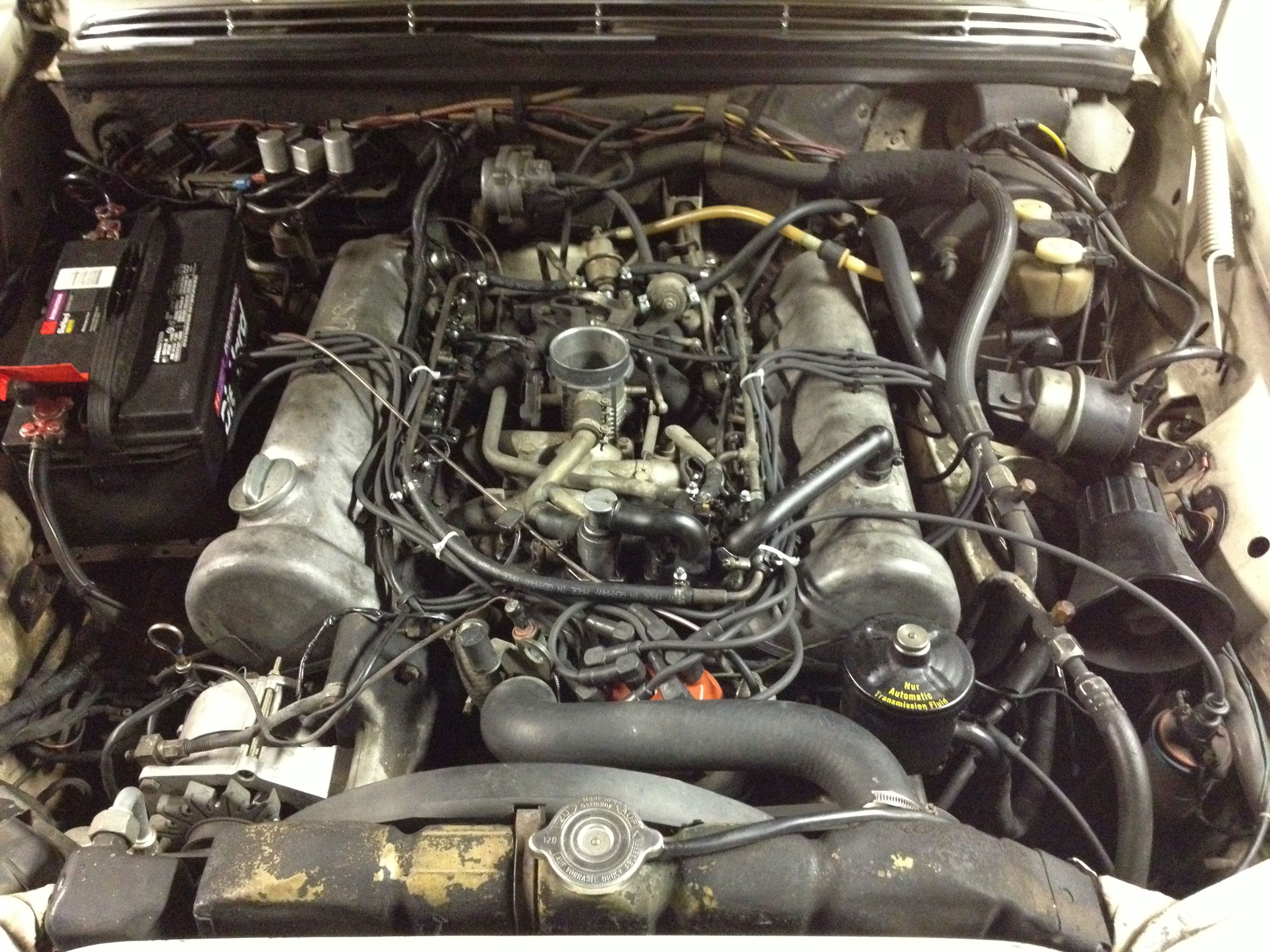
The 4.5 litre M117 with the air cleaner removed, showing the components of the D-Jetronic electronic ignition

The M116 powered 300 SEL 3.5 was introduced to the United States for the 1970 Model year at the New York International Auto Show. The 1970 amendment of the Clean Air Act, stipulated reduction of Nitrogen Oxide emissions, which would result in lowering of compression ratios and reduction of fuel octane levels. To compensate for this, and to stay competitive in its top export market, Mercedes-Benz stroked the M116 by 19.2 mm, raising the displacement to 4,520 cc (275.8 cu in). The 4.5 L V8 engine was designated as M 117 and made 195 hp (145 kW; 198 PS) at 4500 RPM, falling just short of the domestic 3.5 L V8 engine. However, it did generate 36.5 kp⋅m (358 N⋅m; 264 lb⋅ft) of torque at 3,000 RPM, 25 % more than the domestic 3.5, at which it was considered sufficient that the MB to pull the 6.3 out of the US export market for the 1972 and 1973 MY. The M117 was coupled with the new W4A 040 three speed automatic which introduced a torque converter.

The models would be respectively called 280 SE 4.5, 280 SEL 4.5 and 300 SEL 4.5. Sold exclusively to the United States, they would close the W108/W109 and thus the whole Ponton era in November 1972, in a small production overlap with the W116. A total of 24 253 cars would be delivered. Incidentally the M117 would remain exclusive to the United States until mid 1973 for the next generation of 450 series for the 116 and 107 S-class chassis.

== Transmission ==
Unusual among mainstream European automakers of the time, Mercedes developed and built their own automatic transmission system, first went into production in 1961.

The standard transmission for Europe was a four-speed manual gearbox. As an option a four-speed automatic with fluid coupling was available. For the first series it was the K4A 025; for the second series the more reliable and smoother shifting all new K4C 025 was introduced in May 1969. A five-speed manual gearbox was offered for six-cylinder 2.8 L and 3.0 L engines, though a few customers opted for it.

As a pilot the first model of the more reliable and smoother shifting all new four-speed automatic with fluid coupling layout was the K4B 050, 1963 introduced for the 600 and later the 300 SEL 6.3 respectively. Beside the new layout the number of pinions is doubled from 3 to 6 to handle the much higher torque of the big block V8 engine M 100.

After the satisfactory experience with the new design, it was adopted for the new core model K4C 025 for 4- to 6-cylinder engines. With the small block V8 engine M 116, the K4A 040 was launched as a reinforced version of the same design. With the small block V8 engine for the United States M 117, the three-speed automatic with torque converter W4A 040 was derived from this design. It was the first automatic with torque converter Mercedes-Benz offered.

When the 3.5 L V8 engine was introduced in 1969, the sole transmission choice was the K4A 040. Customers could request the four-speed manual transmission with price reduction if they inclined so. For 4.5 L V8 engine for the United States, the sole transmission choice was the W3A 040.

== Models ==
W 108
Name	Chassis code	Production period	Units built	Engine model
Total			359,522	
250 S	108.012	09/1965–03/1969	74,677	2.5 L I6 M 108
250 SE	108.014	09/1965–01/1968	55,181	2.5 L I6 M 129
300 SEb	108.015	08/1965–12/1967	2,737	3.0 L I6 M 189
280 S	108.016	01/1968–09/1972	93,666	2.8 L I6 M 130
280 SE	108.018	01/1968–09/1972	91,051	2.8 L I6 M 130
280 SEL (Note: until 09/1969: 280 SE long (German: lang))	108.019	01/1968–04/1971	8,250	2.8 L I6 M 130
280 SE 3.5	108.057	03/1971–09/1972	11,309	3.5 L V8 M 116
280 SEL 3.5	108.058	03/1971–08/1972	951	3.5 L V8 M 116
280 SE 4.5	108.067	05/1971–11/1972	13,527	4.5 L V8 M 117
280 SEL 4.5	108.068	05/1971–11/1972	8,173	4.5 L V8 M 117

W 109
Name	Chassis code	Production period	Units built	Engine model
Total			23,550	
300 SEL	109.015	03/1966–12/1967	2,369	3.0 L I6 M 189
300 SEL	109.016	02/1968–01/1970	2,519	2.8 L I6 M 130
300 SEL 3.5	109.056	11/1969–09/1972	9,583	3.5 L V8 M 116
300 SEL 4.5	109.057	05/1971–10/1972	2,553	4.5 L V8 M 117
300 SEL 6.3	109.018	12/1967–09/1972	6,526	6.3 L V8 M 100

== Timeline ==
Type	Chassis	1965	1966	1967	1968	1969	1970	1971	1972
Sedan	W 108	250 S
Sedan	W 108	250 SE
Sedan	W 108	300 SEb
Sedan	W 108				280 S
Sedan	W 108				280 SE
Sedan	W 108				280 SEL
Sedan	W 108							280 SE 3.5
Sedan	W 108							280 SEL 3.5
Sedan	W 108							280 SE 4.5
Sedan	W 108							280 SEL 4.5
Sedan	W 109		300 SEL M 189		300 SEL M 130
Sedan	W 109						300 SEL 3.5
Sedan	W 109							300 SEL 4.5
Sedan	W 109				300 SEL 6.3

== Technical info ==
Technical data Mercedes-Benz W 108 (Manufacturer's figures except where stated)
Name	250 S	250 SE	300 SEb	280 S	280 SE 280 SEL (Note: until 09/1969: 280 SE long (German: lang))	280 SE 3.5 280 SEL 3.5	280 SE 4.5 280 SEL 4.5
Model	W 108 II	W 108 III	W 108 IV	W 108 V 28	W 108 E 28	W 108 E 35/1	W 108 E 45
Chassis code	108.012	108.014	108.015	108.016	108.018; 108.019	108.057; 108.058	108.067; 108.068
Production period	07/1965 – 03/1969	08/1965 – 01/1968	08/1965 – 12/1967	11/1967 – 09/1972; 01/1968 – 04/1971		07/1970 – 09/1972; 06/1970 – 08/1972	04/1971 – 11/1972; 05/1971 – 11/1972
Units built	74,677	55,181	2,737	93,666	91,051; 8,250	11,309; 951	13,527; 8,173
Engine model	M 108 I	M 129 I	M 189 VII	M 130 V 28	M 130 E 28	M 116 E 35	M 117 E 45
Engine type	108.920	129.980	189.989	130.920	130.980	116.980	117.984
Engine configuration	Front-engine design, four-stroke						
Engine configuration	Straight-six engine					V8 engine	
Bore × Stroke	82 mm (3.228 in) × 78.8 mm (3.102 in)		85 mm (3.346 in) × 88 mm (3.465 in)	86.5 mm (3.406 in) × 78.8 mm (3.102 in)		92 mm (3.622 in) × 65.8 mm (2.591 in)	92 mm (3.622 in) × 85 mm (3.346 in)
Displacement	2,497 cc (152.4 cu in)		2,996 cc (182.8 cu in)	2,778 cc (169.5 cu in)		3,499 cc (213.5 cu in)	4,520 cc (275.8 cu in)
Max. Power at 1/min	130 PS (96 kW; 128 hp); 5,400	150 PS (110 kW; 148 hp); 5,500	170 PS (125 kW; 168 hp); 5,400	140 PS (103 kW; 138 hp); 5,200	160 PS (118 kW; 158 hp); 5,500	200 PS (147 kW; 197 hp); 5,800	195 hp (145 kW; 198 PS); 4,500
Max. Torque at 1/min	19.8 kp⋅m (194 N⋅m; 143 lb⋅ft); 4,000	22 kp⋅m (216 N⋅m; 159 lb⋅ft); 4,200	25.4 kp⋅m (249 N⋅m; 184 lb⋅ft); 4,000	22.8 kp⋅m (224 N⋅m; 165 lb⋅ft); 3,600	24.5 kp⋅m (240 N⋅m; 177 lb⋅ft); 4,250	29.2 kp⋅m (286 N⋅m; 211 lb⋅ft); 4,000	36.5 kp⋅m (358 N⋅m; 264 lb⋅ft); 3,000
Compression Ratio	9.0 : 1	9.3 : 1 (Note: from 09/1966: 9.5 : 1)	8.8 : 1	9.0 : 1	9.5 : 1		8 0 : 1
Fuel feed	2 Zenith 35/40 compound downdraft carburetors	Bosch 6-point mechanical fuel injection		2 Zenith 35/40 compound downdraft carburetors	Bosch 6-point mechanical fuel injection	Bosch D-Jetronic	
Valvetrain	SOHC, duplex chain						
Cooling	Water						
Electrical system	12 volt						
Gearbox	4-speed manual w/ column or floor shifter						3-speed automatic W4A 040 (type 722.0) w/ column or floor shifter
Gearbox			optional 5-speed manual w/ column or floor shifter			optional 4-speed automatic K4A 040 (type 722.2) w/ column or floor shifter	3-speed automatic W4A 040 (type 722.0) w/ column or floor shifter
Gearbox	optional 4-speed automatic K4A 025 (w/o type) w/ column or floor shifter			optional 4-speed automatic K4C 025 (type 722.1) (Note: until 05/1969: K4A 025 (w/o type)) w/ column or floor shifter		optional 4-speed automatic K4A 040 (type 722.2) w/ column or floor shifter	3-speed automatic W4A 040 (type 722.0) w/ column or floor shifter
Final drive	rear wheel drive						
Final ratio	$\tfrac{47} {12} \ \approxeq \$ 3.917		3.917 or 3.692	$\tfrac{48} {13} \ \approxeq \$ 3.692		$\tfrac{45} {13} \ \approxeq \$ 3.462	$\tfrac{42} {13} \ \approxeq \$ 3.231
Body structure	Sheet steel, monocoque (unibody) construction						
Length	S/SE: 4,900 mm (192.9 in); SEL: 5,000 mm (196.9 in)						
Width	1,810 mm (71.3 in)						
Height	1,440 mm (56.7 in)						
Curb weight manual automatic	1,470 kg (3,241 lb)	1,510 kg (3,329 lb)	1,575 kg (3,472 lb)	1,520 kg (3,351 lb)	1,560 kg (3,439 lb); 1,575 kg (3,472 lb)	1,610 kg (3,549 lb); 1,640 kg (3,616 lb)	
Curb weight manual automatic	1,510 kg (3,329 lb)	1,550 kg (3,417 lb)	1,615 kg (3,560 lb)	1,560 kg (3,439 lb)	1,600 kg (3,527 lb); 1,615 kg (3,560 lb)	1,650 kg (3,638 lb); 1,680 kg (3,704 lb)	1,676 kg (3,695 lb); 1,703 kg (3,755 lb)
Gross weight	1,940 kg (4,277 lb)	1,980 kg (4,365 lb)	2,060 kg (4,542 lb)	1,960 kg (4,321 lb)	1,985 kg (4,376 lb); 2,000 kg (4,409 lb)	2,055 kg (4,530 lb); 2,085 kg (4,597 lb)	2,141 kg (4,720 lb); 2,168 kg (4,780 lb)
Wheelbase	S/SE: 2,750 mm (108.3 in); SEL: 2,850 mm (112.2 in)						
Track front/ rear	1,482 mm (58.3 in) / 1,485 mm (58.5 in)						
Front suspension	Independent, double wishbones, torsion anti-roll bar, coil springs						
Rear suspension	Independent, low-pivot swing axle, radius rods, torsion anti-roll bar, coil springs						
Brakes	Disc brakes (Ø 273 mm (10.7 in) front, 279 mm (11.0 in) rear), power assisted						
Steering	Recirculating ball steering, manual or servo-assisted						
Wheel sizes	6J × 14						
Tyre/Tire sizes	7.35 H 14 or 185 HR 14					185 VR 14	7.35 V 14
Top speed manual automatic	182 km/h (113 mph)	190 km/h (118 mph)	200 km/h (124 mph)	185 km/h (115 mph)	193 km/h (120 mph)	210 km/h (130 mph)	
Top speed manual automatic	177 km/h (110 mph)	185 km/h (115 mph)	195 km/h (121 mph)	180 km/h (112 mph)	188 km/h (117 mph)	205 km/h (127 mph)	
0–100 km/h (62 mph) manual automatic	13 sec.	12 sec.			11 sec.	10 sec.	
0–100 km/h (62 mph) manual automatic	14 sec.	13 sec.			12 sec.	11 sec.	12 sec.
Fuel Consumption (estimate) manual automatic	15.5 L/100 km (18.2 mpg_{‑imp}; 15.2 mpg_{‑US})		17.5 L/100 km (16.1 mpg_{‑imp}; 13.4 mpg_{‑US})	16 L/100 km (18 mpg_{‑imp}; 15 mpg_{‑US})		18.5 L/100 km (15.3 mpg_{‑imp}; 12.7 mpg_{‑US})	
Fuel Consumption (estimate) manual automatic	16.5 L/100 km (17.1 mpg_{‑imp}; 14.3 mpg_{‑US})		18.5 L/100 km (15.3 mpg_{‑imp}; 12.7 mpg_{‑US})	17 L/100 km (17 mpg_{‑imp}; 14 mpg_{‑US})		19.5 L/100 km (14.5 mpg_{‑imp}; 12.1 mpg_{‑US})	16.3 L/100 km (17.3 mpg_{‑imp}; 14.4 mpg_{‑US})
Fuel tank capacity	82 L (21.7 US gal; 18.0 imp gal)						
Price Germany USA	DM 15,300 $5,747	DM 16,850 $6,385	DM 21,500 $8,048	DM 17,000 $5,897	DM 18,600 $6,222; DM 21,230 $6,622	DM 24,920 $10,076; DM 27,310 $ n/a	DM n/a $ tbd DM n/a $ tbd

Technical data Mercedes-Benz W 109 (Manufacturer's figures except where stated)
Name	300 SEL		300 SEL 3.5	300 SEL 4.5	300 SEL 6.3
Model	W 109 III	W 109 E 28	W 109 E 35/1	W 109 E 45	W 109 E 63
Chassis code	109.015	109.016	109.056	109.057	109.018
Production period	09/1965 – 12/1967	12/1967 – 01/1970	08/1969 – 09/1972	05/1971 – 10/1972	12/1967 – 09/1972
Units built	2,369	2,519	9,583	2,553	6,526
Engine model	M 189 VII	M 130 E 28	M 116 E 35	M 117 E 45	M 100 E 63
Engine type	189.988	130.981	116.981	117.981	100.981
Engine configuration	Front-engine design, four-stroke				
Engine configuration	Straight-six engine		V8 engine		
Bore × Stroke	85 mm (3.346 in) × 88 mm (3.465 in)	86.5 mm (3.406 in) × 78.8 mm (3.102 in)	92 mm (3.622 in) × 65.8 mm (2.591 in)	92 mm (3.622 in) × 85 mm (3.346 in)	103 mm (4.055 in) × 95 mm (3.740 in)
Displacement	2,996 cc (182.8 cu in)	2,778 cc (169.5 cu in)	3,499 cc (213.5 cu in)	4,520 cc (275.8 cu in)	6,333 cc (386.5 cu in)
Max. Power at 1/min	170 PS (125 kW; 168 hp); 5,400	170 PS (125 kW; 168 hp); 5,750	200 PS (147 kW; 197 hp); 5,800	195 hp (145 kW; 198 PS); 4,500	250 PS (184 kW; 247 hp); 4,000
Max. Torque at 1/min	25.4 kp⋅m (249 N⋅m; 184 lb⋅ft); 4,000	24.5 kp⋅m (240 N⋅m; 177 lb⋅ft); 4,500	29.2 kp⋅m (286 N⋅m; 211 lb⋅ft); 4,000	36.5 kp⋅m (358 N⋅m; 264 lb⋅ft); 3,000	51 kp⋅m (500 N⋅m; 369 lb⋅ft); 2,800
Compression Ratio	8.8 : 1	9.5 : 1		8.0 : 1	9.0 : 1
Fuel feed	Bosch 6-point mechanical fuel injection		Bosch D-Jetronic		Bosch 8-point mechanical fuel injection
Valvetrain	SOHC, duplex chain				
Cooling	Water				
Electrical system	12 volt				
Gearbox	4-speed manual w/ column or floor shifter		4-speed automatic K4A 040 (type 722.2) w/ column or floor shifter (Note: Customers could request the four-speed manual transmission with price reduction if they inclined so)	3-speed automatic W3A 040 (type 722.0) w/ column or floor shifter	4-speed automatic K4B 050 (w/o type) w/ column or floor shifter
Gearbox	optional 5-speed manual w/ column or floor shifter		4-speed automatic K4A 040 (type 722.2) w/ column or floor shifter	3-speed automatic W3A 040 (type 722.0) w/ column or floor shifter	4-speed automatic K4B 050 (w/o type) w/ column or floor shifter
Gearbox	optional 4-speed automatic K4A 025 (w/o type) (Note: from 05/1969: K4C 025 (type 722.1)) w/ column or floor shifter		4-speed automatic K4A 040 (type 722.2) w/ column or floor shifter	3-speed automatic W3A 040 (type 722.0) w/ column or floor shifter	4-speed automatic K4B 050 (w/o type) w/ column or floor shifter
Final drive	rear wheel drive				
Final ratio	$\tfrac{47} {12} \ \approxeq \$ 3.917 or $\tfrac{48} {13} \ \approxeq \$ 3.692		$\tfrac{45} {13} \ \approxeq \$ 3.462	$\tfrac{42} {13} \ \approxeq \$ 3.231	$\tfrac{37} {13} \ \approxeq \$ 2.846
Body structure	Sheet steel, monocoque (unibody) construction				
Length	5,000 mm (196.9 in)				
Width	1,810 mm (71.3 in)				
Height	1,410 mm (55.5 in)				1,420 mm (55.9 in)
Curb weight manual automatic	1,655 kg (3,649 lb)		1,730 kg (3,814 lb)		
Curb weight manual automatic	1,695 kg (3,737 lb)		1,770 kg (3,902 lb)	1,758 kg (3,875 lb)	1,830 kg (4,034 lb)
Gross weight	2,140 kg (4,718 lb)	2,120 kg (4,674 lb)	2,170 kg (4,784 lb)	2,223 kg (4,900 lb)	2,265 kg (4,993 lb)
Wheelbase	2,850 mm (112.2 in)				2,865 mm (112.8 in)
Track front/ rear	1,482 mm (58.3 in); 1,485 mm (58.5 in)				1,490 mm (58.7 in); 1,485 mm (58.5 in)
Front suspension	Independent, double wishbones, torsion anti-roll bar, air and additional rubber springs				
Rear suspension	Independent, low-pivot swing axle, radius rods, torsion anti-roll bar, air and additional rubber springs				
Brakes	Disc brakes (Ø 273 mm (10.7 in) front, 279 mm (11.0 in) rear), power assisted				
Steering	Recirculating ball steering, servo-assisted				
Wheel sizes	6J × 14				6 1/2J × 14
Tyre/Tire sizes	7.35 H 14 or 185 HR 14		185 VR 14	7.35 V 14	FR 70 VR 14 or 205 VR 14 L
Top speed manual automatic	200 km/h (124 mph)		210 km/h (130 mph)		
Top speed manual automatic	195 km/h (121 mph)		205 km/h (127 mph)		220 km/h (137 mph); 221 km/h (137 mph)
0–100 km/h (62 mph) manual automatic	11 sec.		10 sec.		
0–100 km/h (62 mph) manual automatic	12 sec.		11 sec.	12 sec.	8 sec. 6.5 sec.
Fuel Consumption (estimate) manual automatic	17.5 L/100 km (16.1 mpg_{‑imp}; 13.4 mpg_{‑US})	16.5 L/100 km (17.1 mpg_{‑imp}; 14.3 mpg_{‑US})	18.5 L/100 km (15.3 mpg_{‑imp}; 12.7 mpg_{‑US})		
Fuel Consumption (estimate) manual automatic	18.5 L/100 km (15.3 mpg_{‑imp}; 12.7 mpg_{‑US})	17.5 L/100 km (16.1 mpg_{‑imp}; 13.4 mpg_{‑US})	19.5 L/100 km (14.5 mpg_{‑imp}; 12.1 mpg_{‑US})	16.3 L/100 km (17.3 mpg_{‑imp}; 14.4 mpg_{‑US})	21.0 L/100 km (13.5 mpg_{‑imp}; 11.2 mpg_{‑US})
Fuel tank capacity	82 L (21.7 US gal; 18.0 imp gal)				105 L (27.7 US gal; 23.1 imp gal)
Price Germany USA	DM 28,000 $9,910	DM 25,740 $9,400	DM 29,640 $ n/a	DM n/a $11,327	DM 39,160 $15,122
