= Mercedes-Benz M116 engine =

Mercedes-Benz M116 Engine
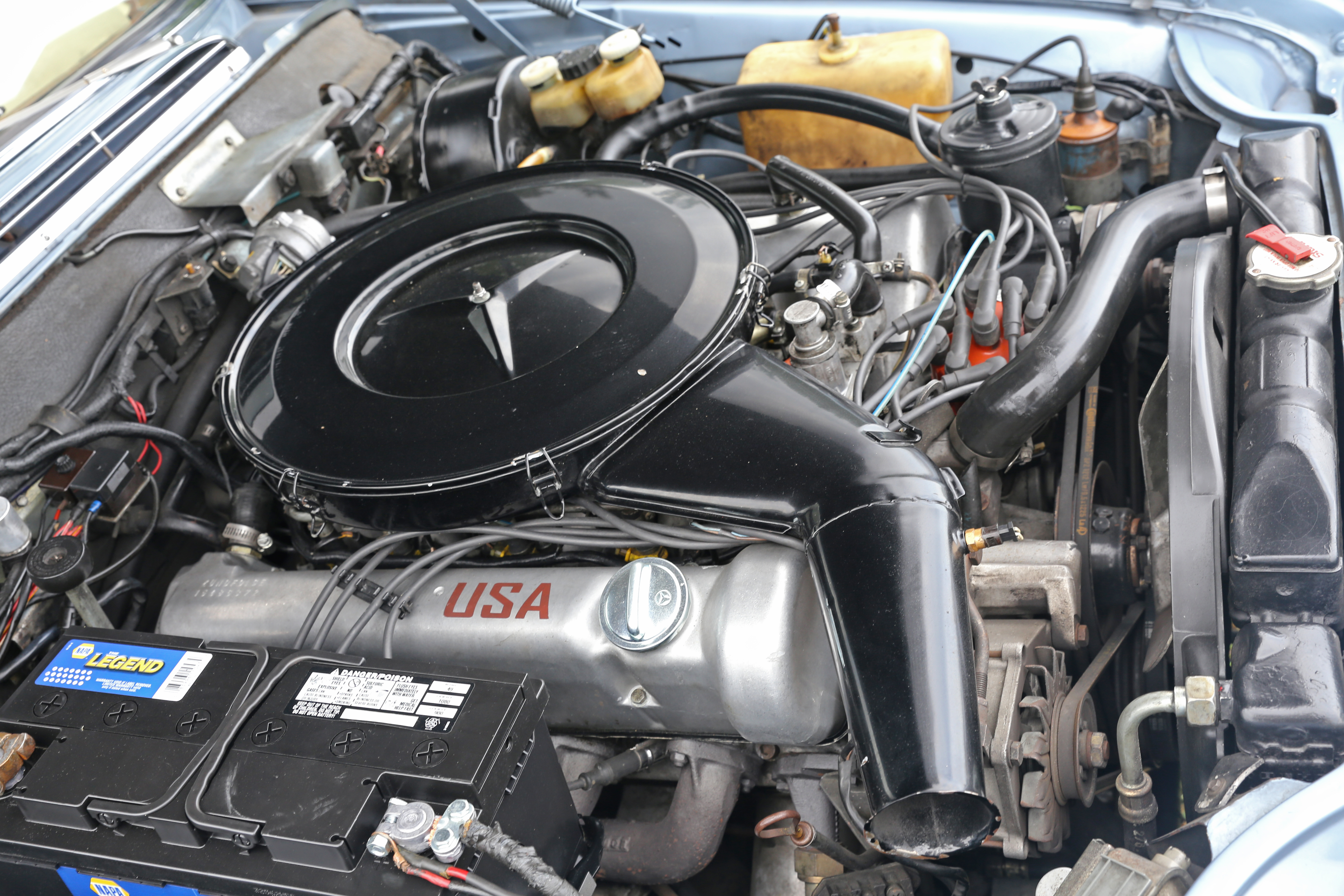
- 3.5 litre, US-spec M116.980 in a 280 SE 3.5 Coupé

Overview
- Manufacturer: Mercedes-Benz
- Production: 1969–1991

Layout
- Configuration: Naturally aspirated 90° V8
- Displacement: 3.5 L (3,499 cc); 3.8 L (3,818 cc); 3.8 L (3,839 cc); 4.2 L (4,196 cc)
- Cylinder block material: Cast iron 1969-1978; Aluminum 1978-1991
- Cylinder head material: Aluminum
- Valvetrain: SOHC with 2 valves x cyl.

Combustion
- Fuel system: Fuel injection
- Management: Bosch Jetronic
- Fuel type: Gasoline
- Oil system: Wet sump
- Cooling system: Water-cooled

Output
- Power output: 158–231 PS (116–170 kW; 156–228 hp)
- Torque output: 266–310 N⋅m (196–229 lb⋅ft)

Chronology
- Predecessor: Mercedes-Benz M100 engine
- Successor: Mercedes-Benz M119 engine

The Mercedes-Benz M116 is an automotive V8 engine made in several versions by Mercedes-Benz between 1969 and 1991. All models were gasoline powered and utilized a single overhead camshaft with 2 valves per cylinder and Bosch Jetronic fuel injection. The larger M117 V8 followed, introduced initially in the US market.

== 3.5 ==
The original M116 engine 116.980 was introduced August 1969 in the 300SEL 3.5. It featured 9.5:1 compression with 200 PS (147 kW; 197 hp) at 5,800 rpm and 286 N⋅m (211 lb⋅ft) at 4,000 rpm. This was enough to propel the 1,575 kg (3,472 lb) saloon to a top speed of 205 km/h (127 mph). This engine and its twin, the 116.981 remained in production until 1980 when it was replaced by its larger 3.8 litre variant.

- Bore x Stroke: 92 mm × 65.8 mm (3.62 in × 2.59 in) Displacement 3.5 L (3,499 cc)

=== Usage ===
- 1971-1980 Mercedes-Benz C107
- 1971-1980 Mercedes-Benz R107
- 1970-1972 Mercedes-Benz W108
- 1969-1972 Mercedes-Benz W109
- 1970-1971 Mercedes-Benz W111
- 1973-1980 Mercedes Benz W116

== 3.8 ==
The 116.960 engine was introduced in 1979 featuring 8.3:1 compression with 158 PS (116 kW; 156 hp) at 4,750 rpm and 266 N⋅m (196 lb⋅ft) at 2,750 rpm. This engine reached North America later for the 1981 380SL. There were 116.961, 116.962, and 116.963 versions of this engine. Early models came with a single row timing chain until 1983 and were plagued with chain failure problems which Mercedes-Benz would repair free of charge, changing the timing chain to a dual row thus resolved the problem making these engine as durable and reliable as any other Mercedes V8. All 1984 and 1985 3.8 V8 models came with a double row timing chain from the factory to prevent this failure, however this engine was replaced for the 1986 model year by its larger 4.2 litre variant.

- Bore x Stroke: 88 mm × 78.9 mm (3.46 in × 3.11 in) Displacement 3.8 L (3,818 cc)

=== Usage ===
- 1980-1982 Mercedes-Benz C107
- 1980-1985 Mercedes-Benz R107
- 1979-1985 Mercedes-Benz W126
- 1982-1983 Monteverdi Tiara

== 4.2 ==
The 116.965 engine was introduced in 1986 for the revised S-Class. It featured 9.0:1 compression and had from 204–231 PS (150–170 kW; 201–228 hp) depending on year and export market. All engines were mated to the Mercedes-Benz 4G-Tronic transmission. In North America, this engine was only used in 420SEL models featuring 204 PS (150 kW; 201 hp) at 5,200 rpm and 310 N⋅m (229 lb⋅ft) at 3,600 rpm. This engine was used until 1991 when it was replaced by the newer 4.2L Double overhead camshaft Mercedes-Benz M119 engine with which it shares no parts.

- Bore x Stroke: 92 mm × 78.9 mm (3.62 in × 3.11 in) Displacement 4.2 L (4,196 cc)

=== Usage ===
- 1986-1989 Mercedes-Benz R107
- 1986-1991 Mercedes-Benz W126
