= Mercedes-Benz M117 engine =

Mercedes-Benz M117 Engine
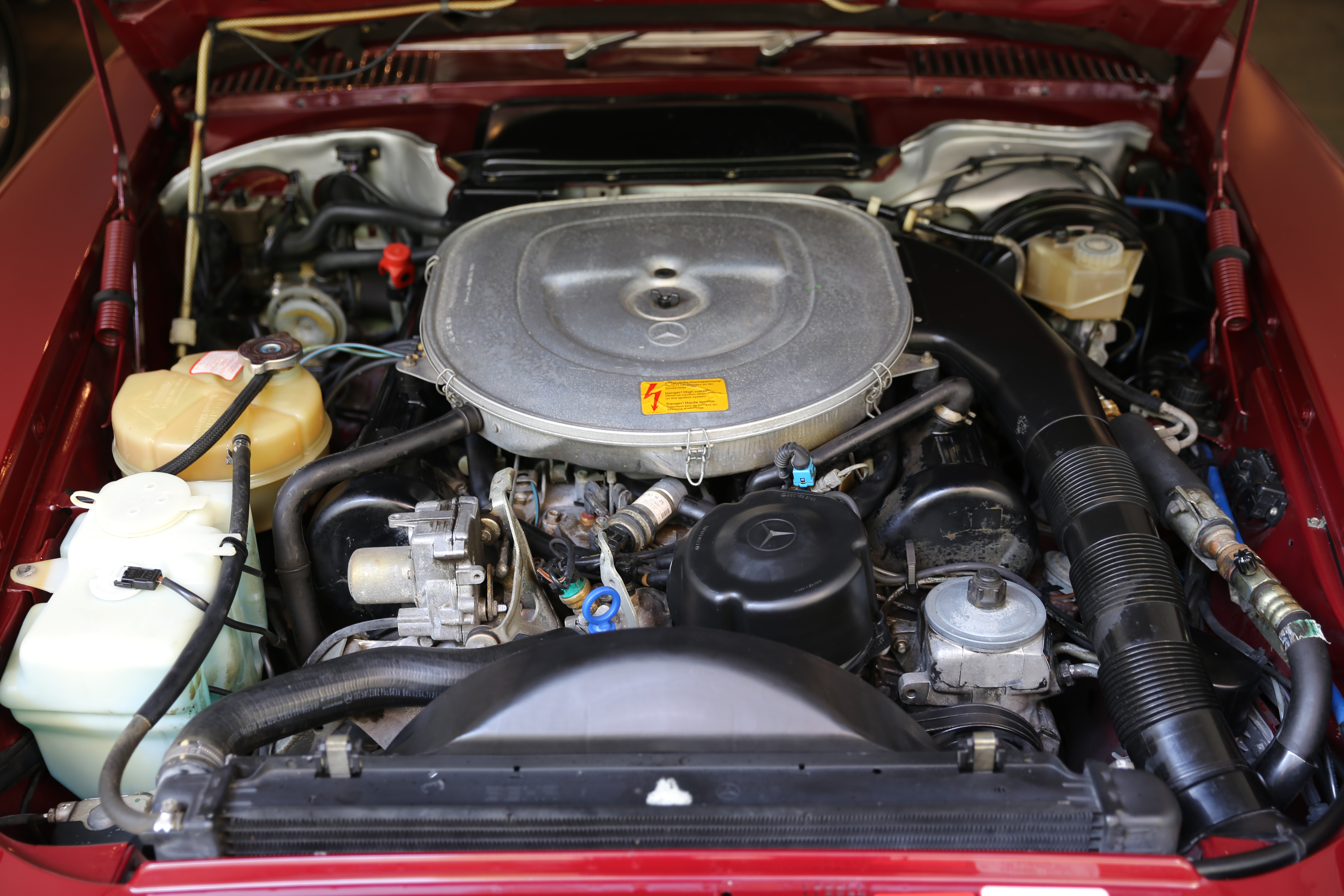
- An M117 4.5 L engine from a 1972 280SE 4.5

Overview
- Manufacturer: Daimler-Benz
- Production: 1971–1991

Layout
- Configuration: Naturally aspirated 90° V8
- Displacement: 4.5 L (4,520 cc); 5.0 L (4,973 cc); 5.0 L (5,025 cc); 5.5 L (5,547 cc)
- Cylinder block material: Cast iron 1971-1978; Alusil 1978-1991
- Cylinder head material: Aluminum
- Valvetrain: SOHC with 2 valves x cyl.

Combustion
- Fuel system: Continuous multi-point injection
- Management: Bosch K(E)-Jetronic
- Fuel type: Gasoline
- Oil system: Wet sump
- Cooling system: Water-cooled

Output
- Power output: 185–300 PS (136–221 kW; 182–296 hp)
- Torque output: 298–455 N⋅m (220–336 lb⋅ft)

Chronology
- Predecessor: Mercedes-Benz M100 engine
- Successor: Mercedes-Benz M119 engine

The Mercedes-Benz M117 is an OHC (overhead cam), 2 valve per cylinder V8 engine made in several versions by Daimler-Benz between 1971 and 1992.

== Applications ==
- 280 SE, SEL 4.5 (W108)
- 300 SEL 4.5 (W109)
- 450 SE, SEL (W116)
- 450 SL, SLC (R107 / C107)
- 450 SLC 5.0 (C107)
- 500 GE (W463)
- 500 SE, SEL, SEC (W / V / C126)
- 500 SL, SLC (R107 / C107)
- 560 SE, SEL, SEC (W / V / C126)
- 560 SL (R107)

Racing

- Sauber C8
- Sauber C9

Other Manufacturers

- Isdera Autobahnkurier AK116i
- Isdera Erator GTE
- Isdera Imperator 108i
- Lotec C1000 (with two turbochargers)
- Monteverdi Tiara
- Zender Vision 3
