= Mercedes-Benz 7G-Tronic transmission =

World's first 7-speed automatic from 2003

7G-Tronic
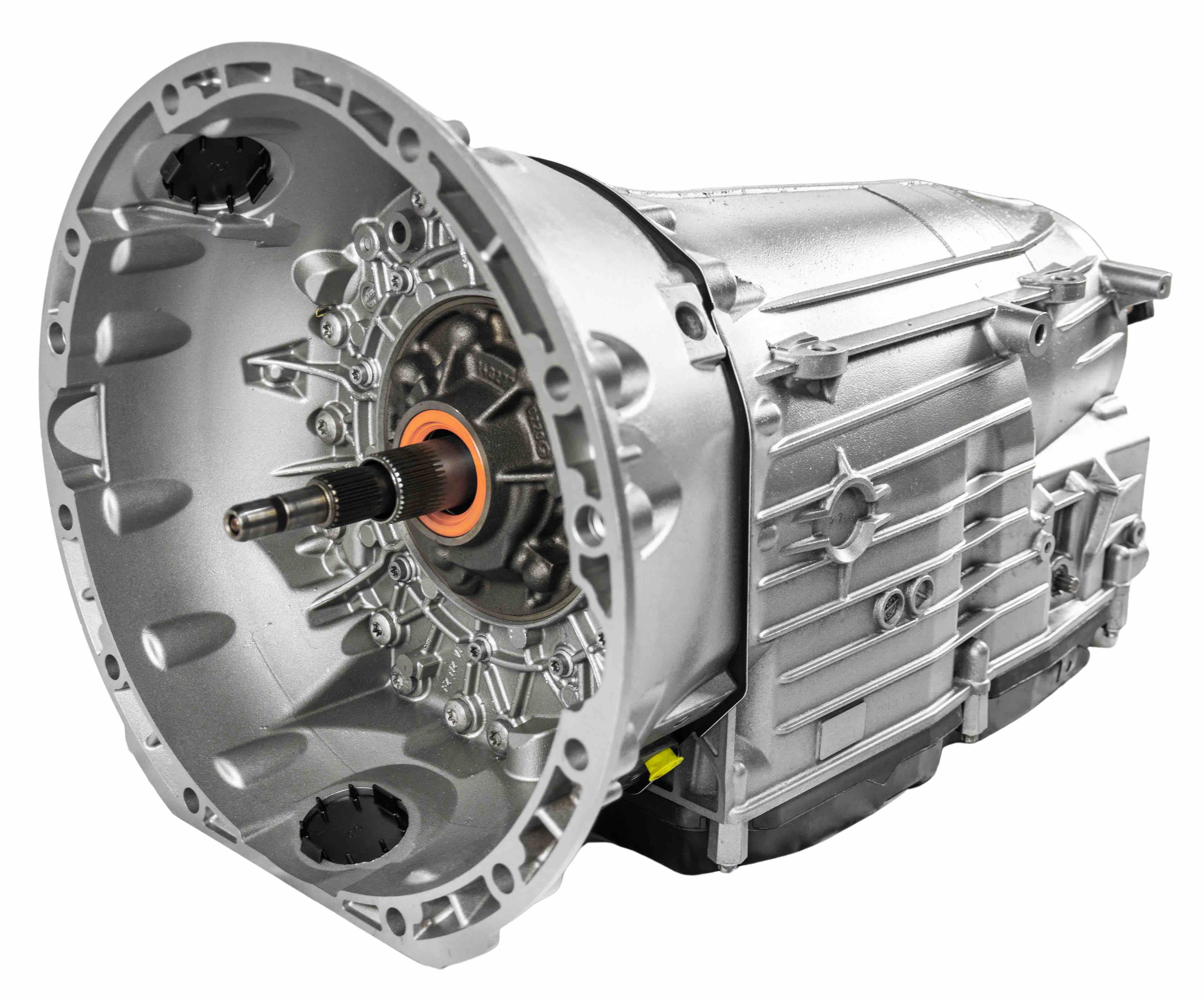
- Mercedes-Benz 7G-Tronic transmission

Overview
- Manufacturer: Mercedes-Benz (Daimler AG)
- Model code: W7A 400 · W7A 700 · Type 722.9
- Production: 2003–2020

Body and chassis
- Class: 7-speed longitudinal automatic transmission
- Related: ZF 6HP · ZF 8HP

Chronology
- Predecessor: 5G-Tronic
- Successor: 9G-Tronic

7G-Tronic is Mercedes-Benz's trademark name for its 7-speed automatic transmission type 722.9. It was produced from 2003 to 2020 in different variants as converter-7-gear-automatic transmission (German: Wandler-7-Gang-Automatik). The core models W7A 400 and W7A 700 are for engines up to 400 N⋅m (295 lb⋅ft) or 700 N⋅m (516 lb⋅ft) maximum input torque.

== Key data ==
Gear ratios (Note: Differences in gear ratios have a measurable, direct impact on vehicle dynamics, performance, waste emissions as well as fuel mileage)
Model	Type	First Deliv- ery	Gear									Total Span			Avg. Step	Components		Nomenclature			
Model	Type	First Deliv- ery	R 2	R 1	1	2	3	4	5	6	7	Nomi- nal	Effec- tive	Cen- ter	Avg. Step	Total	per Gear (Note: Forward gears only)	Cou- pling	Gears Count	Ver- sion	Maximum Input Torque
W7A 400 W7A 700 W7A 900	722.9; NAG 2 (Note: 2nd generation of advanced automatic transmissions, at Mercedes-Benz referred to as NAG 2 (New Automatic Gearbox Generation 2 · German: Neue Automatikgetriebe-Generation 2))	2003	−2.231	−3.416	4.377	2.859	1.921	1.368	1.000	0.820	0.728	6.016	4.695	1.785	1.349	4 Gearsets; 4 Brakes; 3 Clutches	1.571	W (Note: Torque converter · German: Wandler or Drehmomentwandler)	7	A	400 N⋅m (295 lb⋅ft); 700 N⋅m (516 lb⋅ft); 1,000 N⋅m (738 lb⋅ft)

== History ==
This fifth-generation transmission was the first 7-speed automatic transmission ever used on a production passenger vehicle. It initially was introduced in autumn 2003 on five different V8-cylinder models: the E 500, S 430, S 500, CL 500, and SL 500. It became available on many 6-cylinder models too. Turbocharged V12 engines, 4-cylinder applications and commercial vehicles continued to use the older Mercedes-Benz 5G-Tronic transmission for many years.

Development took place at the group's headquarters in Stuttgart-Untertuerkheim. The transmission was produced only at the Daimler plant not far away in Stuttgart-Hedelfingen, the site of Daimler-Benz's original production facility. In July 2009, Mercedes-Benz announced they were working on a new nine-speed automatic.

== Specifications ==
=== Operating modes ===
==== Regular ====
The W7A uses neither bands nor sprag clutches. It is fully electronic controlled. On vehicles with 6 or 8 cylinder engines with comfort mode engaged, as well as on off-road vehicles with low range selected, the transmission will always use 2nd gear as initial gear.

The transmission can skip gears when downshifting. It also has a torque converter lock-up on all 7 gears, allowing better transmission of torque for improved acceleration. The transmission's casing is made of magnesium alloy, a first for the industry, to save weight.

==== „Limp-home mode“ ====
If the transmission control unit senses a critical fault during driving, it will activate an emergency operating mode: Upon hydraulic failures, it will stop shifting gears and permanently retain the currently selected gear; if the failure can be pinpointed to one of the internal hydraulic control valves, the transmission will continue shifting but stop using the affected gear(s). Upon electrical failure, the transmission shifts to 6th gear. If the critical fault persists after the vehicle is stopped and the engine restarted, only 2nd gear and reverse gear #2 are available.

=== AMG SpeedShift ===
==== AMG SpeedShift TCT ====
The TCT transmission is essentially the 7G-Tronic automatic transmission including "Torque Converter Technology". Sporty, performance-oriented version with the same gear ratios. First used in 2005 Mercedes-Benz SLK 55 AMG. In 2007, 7G-Tronic transmission with AMG SpeedShift was also called '7G-Tronic Sport'.

==== AMG SpeedShift MCT ====
Mercedes-AMG developed the 7-speed MCT "Multi Clutch Technology" planetary automatic transmission. The MCT transmission is essentially the 7G-Tronic automatic transmission without a torque converter. Instead of a torque converter, it uses a compact wet startup clutch to launch the car from a stop and also supports computer-controlled double-clutching. The MCT (Multi-Clutch Technology) acronym refers to a planetary (automatic) transmission's multiple clutches and bands for each gear.

The MCT is fitted with 4 drive modes: "C" (Comfort), "S" (Sport), "S+" (Sport plus) and "M" (Manual) and boasts 0.1 second shifts in "M" and "S+" modes. MCT-equipped cars are also fitted with the new AMG Drive Unit with an innovative Race Start function. The AMG Drive Unit is the central control unit for the AMG SpeedShift MCT 7-speed sports transmission and all driving dynamics functions. The driver can change gears either using the selector lever or by nudging the steering-wheel shift paddles. The new Race start Function is a launch control system that enables the driver to call on maximum acceleration while ensuring optimum traction of the driven wheels.

It is available on the 2009 SL 63 AMG and E 63 AMG, and will be used for the 2011 S 63 AMG and CL 63 AMG, and the 2012 CLS 63 AMG and C 63 AMG. Compulsory on the 2014 CLS 63 and E 63 AMG models, as well as their "S--Model" variants. Improved with the release of the 2015 model year, by decreasing the lag time between shifts.

== Planetary gearset concept ==
=== Improved fuel economy ===
The main objective in replacing the predecessor model was to improve vehicle fuel economy with extra speeds and a wider gear span to allow the engine speed level to be lowered (downspeeding), which is a decisive factor in improving energy efficiency and thus reducing fuel consumption. In addition, the lower engine speed level improves the noise-vibration-harshness comfort and the exterior noise is reduced.

Torque converter lock-up can operate in all 7 forward gears. The company claims that the 7G-Tronic is more fuel efficient and has shorter acceleration times and quicker intermediate sprints than the outgoing 5-speed automatic transmission.

=== Reduced manufacturing complexity ===
In order to avoid a further increase in manufacturing complexity while expanding the number of gear ratios, Mercedes-Benz switched from the conventional design method—in which the planetary gearset concept was limited to a purely serial or in-line power flow—to a more modern design method that utilizes a planetary gearset concept with combined parallel and serial power flow. This was only possible thanks to computer-aided design and has resulted in a globally patented gearset concept. The resulting progress is reflected in a better ratio of the number of gears to the number of components used compared to existing layouts.

This is Mercedes-Benz second generation of advanced automatic transmissions. The design is more advanced than its direct predecessor, but significantly less economical than its competitors. Since Mercedes can charge higher prices than many of its competitors, it was possible to include the 7G-Tronic in the range. With its all new parallel power flow the W7A is referred to at Mercedes-Benz as NAG 2 (New Automatic Gearbox Generation, starting with type 722.6 as generation 1 and continuing with type 722.9 as generation 2).

Planetary gearset concept: manufacturing complexity (Note: Progress increases cost-effectiveness and is reflected in the ratio of forward gears to main components. It depends on the power flow: parallel: using the two degrees of freedom of planetary gearsets; to increase the number of gears; with unchanged number of components; serial: in-line combined planetary gearsets without using the two degrees of freedom; to increase the number of gears; a corresponding increase in the number of components is unavoidable)
With Assessment	Output: Gear Ratios	Innovation Elasticity (Note: Innovation elasticity classifies progress and market position: Automobile manufacturers drive forward technical developments primarily in order to remain competitive or to achieve or defend technological leadership. This technical progress has therefore always been subject to economic constraints; Only innovations whose relative additional benefit is greater than the relative additional resource input, i.e. whose economic elasticity is greater than 1, are considered for realization; The required innovation elasticity of an automobile manufacturer depends on its expected return on investment. The basic assumption that the relative additional benefit must be at least twice as high as the relative additional resource input helps with orientation; negative, if the output increases and the input decreases, is perfect; 2 or above is good; 1 or above is acceptable (red); below this is unsatisfactory (bold)) Δ Output : Δ Input	Input: Main Components			
With Assessment	Output: Gear Ratios	Innovation Elasticity Δ Output : Δ Input	Total	Gearsets	Brakes	Clutches
W7A Ref. Object	$n_{O1}$ $n_{O2}$	Topic	$n_I= n_G+$ $n_B+ n_C$	$n_{G1}$ $n_{G2}$	$n_{B1}$ $n_{B2}$	$n_{C1}$ $n_{C2}$
Δ Number	$n_{O1}- n_{O2}$	Topic	$n_{I1}- n_{I2}$	$n_{G1}- n_{G2}$	$n_{B1}- n_{B2}$	$n_{C1}- n_{C2}$
Relative Δ	Δ Output $\tfrac{n_{O1}- n_{O2}} {n_{O2}}$	$\tfrac{n_{O1}- n_{O2}} {n_{O2}}: \tfrac{n_{I1}- n_{I2}} {n_{I2}}$ $=\tfrac{n_{O1}- n_{O2}} {n_{O2}} \cdot \tfrac{n_{I2}} {n_{I1}- n_{I2}}$	Δ Input $\tfrac{n_{I1}- n_{I2}} {n_{I2}}$	$\tfrac{n_{G1}- n_{G2}} {n_{G2}}$	$\tfrac{n_{B1}- n_{B2}} {n_{B2}}$	$\tfrac{n_{C1}- n_{C2}} {n_{C2}}$
W7A W5A (Note: Direct predecessor: To reflect the progress of the specific model change)	7 (Note: plus 2 reverse gears); 5	Progress	11; 9	4 (Note: of which 2 gearsets are combined as a compound Ravigneaux gearset); 3	4; 3	3; 3
Δ Number	2	Progress	2	1	1	0
Relative Δ	0.400 $\tfrac{2} {5}$	1.800 $\tfrac{2} {5} : \tfrac{2} {9}= \tfrac{2} {5} \cdot \tfrac{9} {2}= \tfrac{9} {5}$	0.222 $\tfrac{2} {9}$	0.333 $\tfrac{1} {3}$	0.333 $\tfrac{1} {3}$	0.000 $\tfrac{0} {3}$
W7A ZF 8HP (Note: Reference standard (benchmark): In 2008 the 8HP became the new reference standard (benchmark) for automatic transmissions)	7; 8 (Note: plus 1 reverse gear)	Late Market Position	11; 9	4; 4	4; 3	3; 2
Δ Number	–1	Late Market Position	–2	0	–1	–1
Relative Δ	−0.125 $\tfrac{-1} {8}$	−0.562 $\tfrac{-1} {8}: \tfrac{2} {9}= \tfrac{-1} {8} \cdot \tfrac{9} {2}= \tfrac{-9} {16}$	0.222 $\tfrac{2} {9}$	0.000 $\tfrac{0} {4}$	0.333 $\tfrac{1} {3}$	0.500 $\tfrac{1} {2}$
W7A ZF 6HP (Note: Reference standard (benchmark) at that time: The 6HP became the new reference standard (benchmark) for automatic transmissions at that time)	7; 6	Early Market Position	11; 8	4; 3	4; 2	3; 3
Δ Number	1	Early Market Position	3	1	2	0
Relative Δ	0.167 $\tfrac{1} {6}$	0.444 $\tfrac{1} {6}: \tfrac{3} {8}= \tfrac{1} {6} \cdot \tfrac{8} {3}= \tfrac{4} {9}$	0.375 $\tfrac{3} {8}$	0.333 $\tfrac{1} {3}$	1.000 $\tfrac{2} {2}$	0.000 $\tfrac{0} {3}$
W7A 3-Speed (Note: Historical reference standard (benchmark): 3-speed transmissions with torque converters have established the modern market for automatic transmissions and thus made it possible in the first place, as this design proved to be a particularly successful compromise between cost and performance; It became the archetype and dominated the world market for around 3 decades, setting the standard for automatic transmissions. It was only when fuel consumption became the focus of interest that this design reached its limits, which is why it has now completely disappeared from the market; What has remained is the orientation that it offers as a reference standard (point of reference, benchmark) for this market for determining progressiveness and thus the market position of all other, later designs; All transmission variants consist of 7 main components; Typical examples are; Turbo-Hydramatic from GM; Cruise-O-Matic from Ford; TorqueFlite from Chrysler; Detroit Gear from BorgWarner for Studebaker; BW-35 from BorgWarner and as T35 from Aisin; 3N 71 from Nissan/Jatco; 3 HP from ZF Friedrichshafen; W3A 040 and W3B 050 from Mercedes-Benz)	7; 3	Historical Market Position	11; 7	4; 2	4; 3	3; 2
Δ Number	4	Historical Market Position	4	2	1	1
Relative Δ	1.333 $\tfrac{4} {3}$	2.333 $\tfrac{4} {3}: \tfrac{4} {7}= \tfrac{4} {3} \cdot \tfrac{7} {4}= \tfrac{7} {3}$	0.571 $\tfrac{4} {7}$	1.00 $\tfrac{2} {2}$	0.333 $\tfrac{1} {3}$	0.500 $\tfrac{1} {2}$

=== Quality ===
The biggest weakness of the gearset concept is the two consecutive reductions in speed increase in 6th and 7th gear.

The layout brings the ability to shift in a non-sequential manner – if required it can skip some gears, that are: 7 to 5, 6 to 2, 5 to 3 and 3 to 1.

It has 2 reverse gears.

Planetary gearset concept: gear ratio quality (Note: Revised 14 January 2026 Nomenclature: $S_n =$ sun gear: number of teeth; $R_n =$ ring gear: number of teeth; $\color{gray}{C_n = }$ carrier or planetary gear carrier (not needed); $s_n =$ sun gear: shaft speed; $r_n =$ ring gear: shaft speed; $c_n =$ carrier or planetary gear carrier: shaft speed; With $n =$ gear is: $i_n =$ gear ratio or transmission ratio; $\omega_{1;n} = \omega_t =$ shaft speed shaft 1: input (turbine) shaft; $\omega_{2;n} =$ shaft speed shaft 2: output shaft; $T_{1;n} = T_t =$ torque shaft 1: input (turbine) shaft; $T_{2;n} =$ torque shaft 2: output shaft; $\mu_n =$ torque ratio or torque conversion ratio; $\eta_n =$ efficiency; $i_0 =$ stationary gear ratio; $\eta_0 =$ (assumed) stationary gear efficiency)
In-Depth Analysis (Note: Gear ratio (transmission ratio) $i_n$ — speed conversion —: The gear ratio $i_n$ is the ratio of; input shaft speed $\omega_{1;n}$; to output shaft speed $\omega_{2;n}$; and therefore corresponds to the reciprocal of the shaft speeds; $i_n = \frac{1} {\frac{\omega_{2;n}} {\omega_{1;n}}} = \frac{\omega_{1;n}} {\omega_{2;n}} = \frac{\omega_t} {\omega_{2;n}}$) With Assessment And Torque Ratio (Note: Torque ratio (torque conversion ratio) $\mu_n$ — torque conversion —: The torque ratio $\mu_n$ is the ratio of; output torque $T_{2;n}$; to input torque $T_{1;n}$; minus efficiency losses; and therefore corresponds (apart from the efficiency losses) to the reciprocal of the shaft speeds too; $\mu_n = i_n \eta_{n;\eta_0} = \frac{\omega_{1;n} \eta_{n;\eta_0}} {\omega_{2;n}} = \frac{T_{2;n} \eta_{n;\eta_0}} {T_{1;n}}$; whereby $\eta_{n;\eta_0}$ may vary from gear to gear according to the formulas listed in this table and $0 \le \eta_{n;\eta_0} \le 1$) And Efficiency Calculation (Note: Efficiency: The efficiency $\eta_n$ is calculated; from the torque ratio; in relation to the gear ratio (transmission ratio); $\eta_n = \frac{\mu_n} {i_n}$; Power loss for single meshing gears; is in the range of 1 % to 1.5 %; helical gear pairs, which are used to reduce noise in passenger cars, are in the upper part of the loss range; spur gear pairs, which are limited to commercial vehicles due to their poorer noise comfort, are in the lower part of the loss range; Corridor for torque ratio and efficiency: in planetary gearsets, the stationary gear ratio $i_0$ is formed via the planetary gears and thus by two meshes; for reasons of simplification, the efficiency for both meshes together is commonly specified there; the efficiencies $\eta_0$ specified here are based on assumed efficiencies for the stationary ratio $i_0$; of $\eta_0 = 0.9800$ (upper value); and $\eta_0 = 0.9700$ (lower value); for both interventions together; The corresponding efficiency; for single-meshing gear pairs is ${\eta_0}^\tfrac {1}{2}$; at $0.9800^\tfrac{1} {2} = 0.98995$ (upper value); and $0.9700^\tfrac{1} {2} = 0.98489$ (lower value))				Planetary Gear Set: Teeth (Note: Layout: Input and output are on opposite sides; Planetary gearset 2 (the outer Ravigneaux gearset) is on the input (turbine) side; Input (turbine) shafts are R_{1} and, if actuated, R_{3}; Output shaft is C_{3})				Count	Nomi- nal (Note: Total ratio span (total gear ratio/total transmission ratio) nominal: $\frac{\omega_{2;n}} {\omega_{2;1}} = \frac{\frac{\omega_{2;n}} {\omega_{2;1} \omega_{2;n}}} {\frac{\omega_{2;1}} {\omega_{2;1} \omega_{2;n}}} = \frac{\frac{1} {\omega_{2;1}}} {\frac{1} {\omega_{2;n}}} = \frac{\frac{\omega_t} {\omega_{2;1}}} {\frac{\omega_t} {\omega_{2;n}}} = \frac{i_1} {i_n}$; A wider span enables the; downspeeding when driving outside the city limits; increase the climbing ability; when driving over mountain passes or off-road; or when towing a trailer) Effec- tive (Note: Total ratio span (total gear ratio/total transmission ratio) effective: $\frac{\omega_{2;n}} {max(\omega_{2;1};|\omega_{2;R}|)} = \frac{min(i_1;|i_R|)} {i_n}$; The span is only effective to the extent that; the reverse gear ratio; matches that of 1st gear; see also Standard R:1; Digression Reverse gear: is usually longer than 1st gear; the effective span is therefore of central importance for describing the suitability of a transmission; because in these cases, the nominal spread conveys a misleading picture; which is only unproblematic for vehicles with high specific power; Market participants: Manufacturers naturally have no interest in specifying the effective span; Users have not yet formulated the practical benefits that the effective span has for them; The effective span has not yet played a role in research and teaching; Contrary to its significance: the effective span has therefore not yet been able to establish itself; either in theory; or in practice.; End of digression)	Cen- ter (Note: Ratio span's center: $(i_1 i_n)^\frac{1} {2}$; The center indicates the speed level of the transmission; Together with the final drive ratio; it gives the shaft speed level of the vehicle)
In-Depth Analysis With Assessment And Torque Ratio And Efficiency Calculation				Ravigneaux		Simple		Count	Nomi- nal Effec- tive	Avg. (Note: Average gear step: $\left( \frac{\omega_{2;n}} {\omega_{2;1}} \right) ^\frac{1} {n-1} = \left( \frac{i_1} {i_n} \right) ^\frac{1} {n-1}$; There are $n-1$ gear steps between $n$ gears; with decreasing step width; the gears connect better to each other; shifting comfort increases)
Model Type	Version First Delivery			S_{1} (Note: Sun 1: sun gear of gearset 1: inner Ravigneaux gearset) R_{1} (Note: Ring 1: ring gear of gearset 1: inner Ravigneaux gearset)	S_{2} (Note: Sun 2: sun gear of gearset 2: outer Ravigneaux gearset) R_{2} (Note: Ring 2: ring gear of gearset 2: outer Ravigneaux gearset)	S_{3} (Note: Sun 3: sun gear of gearset 3) R_{3} (Note: Ring 3: ring gear of gearset 3)	S_{4} (Note: Sun 4: sun gear of gearset 4) R_{4} (Note: Ring 4: ring gear of gearset 4)	Brakes Clutches	Gear Ratio Span	Gear Step (Note: Standard 50:50 — 50 % is above and 50 % is below the average gear step —: With steadily decreasing gear steps (yellow highlighted line Step); and a particularly large step from 1st to 2nd gear; the lower half of the gear steps (between the small gears; rounded down, here the first 3) is always larger; and the upper half of the gear steps (between the large gears; rounded up, here the last 3) is always smaller; than the average gear step (cell highlighted yellow two rows above on the far right); lower half: smaller gear steps are a waste of possible ratios (red bold); upper half: larger gear steps are unsatisfactory (red bold))
Gear	R 3 (Note: In line with the logic for the 2nd reverse gear of the predecessor 5G-Tronic, the extended layout provides this 3rd reverse gear, but it was not used in the transmission that was finally launched on the market)	R 2	R 1	1	2	3	4	5	6	7
Gear Ratio	$\color{grey} {i_{R3}}$	${i_{R2}}$	${i_R}$	${i_1}$	${i_2}$	${i_3}$	${i_4}$	${i_5}$	${i_6}$	${i_7}$
Step	$\color{grey} \frac{i_{R2}} {i_{R3}}$	$\frac{i_{R1}} {i_{R2}}$	$-\frac{i_{R1}} {i_1}$ (Note: Standard R:1 — reverse and 1st gear have the same ratio —: The ideal reverse gear has the same transmission ratio as 1st gear; no impairment when maneuvering; especially when towing a trailer; a torque converter can only partially compensate for this deficiency; Plus 11.11 % minus 10 % compared to 1st gear is good; Plus 25 % minus 20 % is acceptable (red); Above this is unsatisfactory (bold); see also Total ratio span (total gear ratio/total transmission ratio) effective)	$\frac{i_1} {i_1}$	$\frac{i_1} {i_2}$ (Note: Standard 1:2 — gear step 1st to 2nd gear as small as possible —: With continuously decreasing gear steps (yellow marked line Step); the largest gear step is the one from 1st to 2nd gear, which; for a good speed connection and; a smooth gear shift; must be as small as possible; A gear ratio of up to 1.6667 : 1 (5 : 3) is good; Up to 1.7500 : 1 (7 : 4) is acceptable (red); Above is unsatisfactory (bold))	$\frac{i_2} {i_3}$	$\frac{i_3} {i_4}$	$\frac{i_4} {i_5}$	$\frac{i_5} {i_6}$	$\frac{i_6} {i_7}$
Δ Step (Note: From large to small gears (from right to left)) (Note: Standard STEP — from large to small gears: steady and progressive increase in gear steps —: Gear steps should; increase: Δ Step (first green highlighted line Δ Step) is always greater than 1; As progressive as possible: Δ Step is always greater than the previous step; Not progressively increasing is acceptable (red); Not increasing is unsatisfactory (bold))		$\color{grey}\tfrac{i_{R1}} {i_{R2}} : \tfrac{i_{R2}} {i_{R3}}$			$\tfrac{i_1} {i_2} : \tfrac{i_2} {i_3}$	$\tfrac{i_2} {i_3} : \tfrac{i_3} {i_4}$	$\tfrac{i_3} {i_4} : \tfrac{i_4} {i_5}$	$\tfrac{i_4} {i_5} : \tfrac{i_5} {i_6}$	$\tfrac{i_5} {i_6} : \tfrac{i_6} {i_7}$	
Shaft Speed	$\color{grey}\frac{i_1}{i_{R3}}$	$\frac{i_1} {i_{R2}}$	$\frac{i_1} {i_{R1}}$	$\frac{i_1} {i_1}$	$\frac{i_1} {i_2}$	$\frac{i_1} {i_3}$	$\frac{i_1} {i_4}$	$\frac{i_1} {i_5}$	$\frac{i_1} {i_6}$	$\frac{i_1} {i_7}$
Δ Shaft Speed (Note: Standard SPEED — from small to large gears: steady increase in shaft speed difference —: Shaft speed differences should; increase: Δ Shaft Speed (second line marked in green Δ (Shaft) Speed) is always greater than the previous one; 1 difference smaller than the previous one is acceptable (red); 2 consecutive ones are a waste of possible ratios (bold))	$\color{grey}\tfrac{i_1} {i_{R2}} - \tfrac{i_1}{i_{R3}}$	$\tfrac{i_1} {i_{R1}} - \tfrac{i_1} {i_{R2}}$	$0 - \tfrac{i_1} {i_{R1}}$	$\tfrac{i_1} {i_1} - 0$	$\tfrac{i_1} {i_2} - \tfrac{i_1} {i_1}$	$\tfrac{i_1} {i_3} - \tfrac{i_1} {i_2}$	$\tfrac{i_1} {i_4} - \tfrac{i_1} {i_3}$	$\tfrac{i_1} {i_5} - \tfrac{i_1} {i_4}$	$\tfrac{i_1} {i_6} - \tfrac{i_1} {i_5}$	$\tfrac{i_1} {i_7} - \tfrac{i_1} {i_6}$
Torque Ratio	$\color{grey}\mu_{R3}$	$\mu_{R2}$	$\mu_{R1}$	$\mu_1$	$\mu_2$	$\mu_3$	$\mu_4$	$\mu_5$	$\mu_6$	$\mu_7$
Efficiency $\eta_n$	$\color{grey}\frac{\mu_{R2}} {i_{R2}}$	$\frac{\mu_{R2}} {i_{R2}}$	$\frac{\mu_{R1}} {i_{R1}}$	$\frac{\mu_1} {i_1}$	$\frac{\mu_2} {i_2}$	$\frac{\mu_3} {i_3}$	$\frac{\mu_4} {i_4}$	$\frac{\mu_5} {i_5}$	$\frac{\mu_6} {i_6}$	$\frac{\mu_7} {i_7}$
W7A 400 W7A 700 W7A 900 722.9	400 N⋅m (295 lb⋅ft); 700 N⋅m (516 lb⋅ft); 1,000 N⋅m (738 lb⋅ft); NAG 2 (Note: 2nd generation of advanced automatic transmissions, at Mercedes-Benz referred to as NAG 2 (New Automatic Gearbox Generation 2 · German: Neue Automatikgetriebe-Generation 2)) · 2003			42; 86	86; 110	28; 76	46; 114	4; 3	6.0162; 4.6948	1.7846
W7A 400 W7A 700 W7A 900 722.9	400 N⋅m (295 lb⋅ft); 700 N⋅m (516 lb⋅ft); 1,000 N⋅m (738 lb⋅ft); NAG 2 · 2003			42; 86	86; 110	28; 76	46; 114	4; 3	6.0162; 4.6948	1.3486
Gear	R 3	R 2	R 1	1	2	3	4	5	6	7
Gear Ratio	−1.4987 $\color{grey}\tfrac{598} {399}$	−2.2307 $\tfrac{38,272} {17,157}$	−3.4157 $-\tfrac{8,372} {2,451}$	4.3772 $\tfrac{203,840} {46,569}$	2.8586 $\tfrac{133,120} {46,569}$	1.9206 $\tfrac{2,080} {1,083}$	1.3684 $\tfrac{26} {19}$	1.0000 $\tfrac{1} {1}$	0.8204 $\tfrac{38,272} {46,651}$	0.7276 $\tfrac{8,372} {11,507}$
Step	1.4884	1.5313	0.7804	1.0000	1.5313	1.4884	1.4035	1.3684	1.2189	1.1276
Δ Step		1.0288			1.0288	1.0605	1.0256	1.1226	1.0810	
Speed	–2.9205	–1.9622	–1.2815	1.0000	1.5313	2.2791	3.1987	4.3772	5.3355	6.0162
Δ Speed	0.9583	0.6808	1.2815	1.0000	0.5313	0.7478	0.9196	1.1785	0.9583	0.6808
Torque Ratio	–1.4473 –1.4219	–2.1400 –2.0955	–3.2433 –3.1594	4.2560; 4.1965	2.8083; 2.7833	1.8993; 1.8886	1.3611; 1.3574	1.0000	0.8131; 0.8094	0.7179; 0.7130
Efficiency $\eta_n$	0.9657; 0.9487	0.9593; 0.9394	0.9495; 0.9250	0.9723; 0.9587	0.9824; 0.9737	0.9889; 0.9834	0.9946; 0.9919	1.0000	0.9912; 0.9866	0.9868; 0.9799
Actuated shift elements (Note: Permanently coupled elements: C_{1}/C_{2} (the common carrier of the compound Ravigneaux gearset), and R_{4}; R_{3} and C_{4})
Brake 1 (Note: Blocks S_{1} (sun gear of the inner Ravigneaux geaset))		❶			❶				❶	
Brake 2 (Note: Blocks S_{3})				❶	❶	❶	❶			
Brake 3 (Note: Blocks R_{2} (ring gear of the outer Ravigneaux gearset))			❶	❶						❶
Brake BR (Note: Blocks R_{3} and C_{4})	❶	❶	❶							
Clutch 1 (Note: Couples S_{1} (sun gear of inner Ravigneaux gearset) with R_{2} (ring gear of outer Ravigneaux gearset))	❶					❶	❶	❶		
Clutch 2 (Note: Couples R_{1} (ring of inner Ravigneaux gearset) with R_{3} and C_{4})							❶	❶	❶	❶
Clutch 3 (Note: Couples S_{3} with S_{4})	❶	❶	❶	❶	❶	❶		❶	❶	❶
Geometric ratios: speed conversion
Gear Ratio R3 & R2 & 5 Ordinary (Note: Ordinary noted: For direct determination of the gear ratio) Elementary Noted (Note: Elementary noted: Alternative representation for determining the transmission ratio; Contains only operands; With simple fractions of both central gears of a planetary gearset; Or with the value 1; As a basis; For reliable; And traceable; Determination of the torque ratio and efficiency)	$\color{grey}i_{R3} = -\frac{S_4 (S_3+ R_3)} {S_3 R_4}$				$i_{R2} = -\frac{S_4 (S_1+ R_1) (S_3+ R_3)} {R_1 S_3 R_4}$				$i_5 = \frac{1} {1}$	
Gear Ratio R3 & R2 & 5 Ordinary Elementary Noted	$\color{grey} i_{R3} = -\left( 1+ \tfrac{R_3} {S_3} \right) \tfrac{S_4} {R_4}$				$i_{R2} = -\left( 1+ \tfrac{S_1} {R_1} \right) \left( 1+ \tfrac{R_3} {S_3} \right) \tfrac{S_4} {R_4}$				$i_5 = \frac{1} {1}$	
Gear Ratio R1 & 1 Ordinary Elementary Noted	$i_{R1} = -\frac{S_4 (S_2+ R_2) (S_3+ R_3)} {S_2 S_3 R_4}$					$i_1 = \frac{(S_2+ R_2) (S_3+ R_3) (S_4+ R_4)} {S_2 R_3 R_4}$				
Gear Ratio R1 & 1 Ordinary Elementary Noted	$i_{R1} = -\left( 1+ \tfrac{R_2} {S_2} \right) \left( 1+ \tfrac{R_3} {S_3} \right) \tfrac{S_4} {R_4}$					$i_1 = \left( 1+ \tfrac{R_2} {S_2} \right) \left( 1+ \tfrac{S_3} {R_3} \right) \left( 1+\tfrac{S_4} {R_4} \right)$				
Gear Ratio 2–4 Ordinary Elementary Noted	$i_2 = \frac{(S_1+ R_1) (S_3+ R_3) (S_4+ R_4)} {R_1 R_3 R_4}$					$i_3 = \frac{(S_3+ R_3) (S_4+ R_4)} {R_3 R_4}$			$i_4 = \frac{S_3+ R_3} {R_3}$	
Gear Ratio 2–4 Ordinary Elementary Noted	$i_2 = \left( 1+ \tfrac{S_1} {R_1} \right) \left( 1+ \tfrac{S_3} {R_3} \right) \left( 1+\tfrac{S_4} {R_4} \right)$					$i_3 = \left( 1+ \tfrac{S_3} {R_3} \right) \left( 1+\tfrac{S_4} {R_4} \right)$			$i_4 = 1+ \tfrac{S_3} {R_3}$	
Gear Ratio 6 & 7 Ordinary Elementary Noted	$i_6 = \frac{S_4 (S_1+ R_1) (S_3+ R_3)} {S_4 (S_1+ R_1) (S_3+ R_3)+ S_1 S_3 R_4}$					$i_7 = \frac{S_4 (S_2+ R_2) (S_3+ R_3)} {S_4 (S_2+ R_2) (S_3+ R_3)+ R_2 S_3 R_4}$				
Gear Ratio 6 & 7 Ordinary Elementary Noted	$i_6 = \tfrac{1} {1+ \tfrac{\tfrac{R_4} {S_4}} {\left( 1+ \tfrac{R_1} {S_1} \right) \left( 1+\tfrac{R_3} {S_3} \right)}}$					$i_7 = \tfrac{1} {1+ \tfrac{\tfrac{R_4} {S_4}} {\left( 1+ \tfrac{S_2} {R_2} \right) \left( 1+\tfrac{R_3} {S_3} \right) }}$				
Kinetic ratios: torque conversion
Torque Ratio R3 & R2 & 5	$\color{grey} \mu_{R3} = -\left( 1+ \tfrac{R_3} {S_3} \eta_0 \right) \tfrac{S_4} {R_4} {\eta_0}$				$\mu_{R2} = -\left( 1+ \tfrac{S_1} {R_1} \eta_0 \right) \left( 1+ \tfrac{R_3} {S_3} \eta_0 \right) \tfrac{S_4} {R_4} \eta_0$				$\mu_5 {T_{1;5}} = \tfrac{1} {1}$	
Torque Ratio R1 & 1	$\mu_{R1} = -\left( 1+ \tfrac{R_2} {S_2} {\eta_0}^\tfrac{3} {2} \right) \left( 1+ \tfrac{R_3} {S_3} \eta_0 \right) \tfrac{S_4} {R_4} \eta_0$ (Note: Power flow in gearset 2 (the outer Ravigneaux gearset): the ring gear 1 driven by the turbine acts like an inverted sun gear 1 with the size of sun gear 2; this results in the following power flow: $R_1 \Rightarrow Pinions_1 \Rightarrow Pinions_2 \Rightarrow R_2$; this three meshings are reflected in the exponent of the term for efficiency $\tfrac{R_2} {S_2} {\eta_0}^\tfrac{3} {2}$ or $\tfrac{S_2} {R_2} {\eta_0}^\tfrac{3} {2}$; nevertheless, all gear dimensions of gear set 1 can be shortened completely)					$\mu_1 = \left( 1+ \tfrac{R_2} {S_2} {\eta_0}^\tfrac{3} {2} \right) \left( 1+ \tfrac{S_3} {R_3} \eta_0 \right) \left( 1+\tfrac{S_4} {R_4} \eta_0 \right)$				
! Torque Ratio 2–4	$\mu_2 = \left( 1+ \tfrac{S_1} {R_1} \eta_0 \right) \left( 1+ \tfrac{S_3} {R_3} \eta_0 \right) \left( 1+\tfrac{S_4} {R_4} \eta_0 \right)$					$\mu_3 = \left( 1+ \tfrac{S_3} {R_3} \eta_0 \right) \left( 1+\tfrac{S_4} {R_4} \eta_0 \right)$			$\mu_4 = 1+ \tfrac{S_3} {R_3} \eta_0$	
! Torque Ratio 6 & 7	$\mu_6 = \tfrac{1} {1+ \tfrac{\tfrac{R_4} {S_4} \cdot \tfrac{1} {\eta_0}} {\left( 1+ \tfrac{R_1} {S_1} \eta_0 \right) \left( 1+\tfrac{R_3} {S_3} \eta_0 \right)}}$					$\mu_7 = \tfrac{1} {1+ \tfrac{\tfrac{R_4} {S_4} \cdot \tfrac{1} {\eta_0}} {\left( 1+ \tfrac{S_2} {R_2} {\eta_0}^\tfrac{3} {2} \right) \left( 1+\tfrac{R_3} {S_3} \eta_0 \right)}}$				

== Applications ==
Variants and applications
Model	Car Model (Note: without any claim of completeness)
Mercedes models
C-Class	2005–2007 W 203 (C 320 CDI, C 230, C 280, C 350; post-facelift); 2005–2007 CL 203 (C 230 Sport Coupé, C 350 Sport Coupé; post-facelift), (CLC 250, CLC 350); 2007–2011 W 204 (C 320 CDI); 2011–2018 W 204 (C 63 AMG, C 63 AMG Black Series); 2014 W 205 (C 180)
E-Class	2003–2009 W 211 (V6 & V8 models, RWD only); 2009–2016 W 212 (V6 & V8 models, RWD and AWD/4Matic)
S-Class	2013–2017 W 222 (all models except Maybach S 500 and Maybach S 500 4Matic); 2017–2020 W 222 (V12 models only)
SLK-Class	2004–2011 R 171; 2011–2015 R 172
CLS-Class	2003–2010 C 219; 2010–2018 C 218
CLK-Class	2002–2010 C 209
CLA-Class	2016–2019 C 117
Non Mercedes-Benz models
Infiniti	2014–2019 Q50 (2.0t (M274 DE20 LA)); 2015–2016 Q50 (2.2d (OM651 22 LA)).; 2017–2018 Q60 (2.0t (M274 DE20 LA))
SsangYong Motor	2017–2020 Rexton G4 (2.2 e-XDi Euro 6 Turbo-Diesel); Rodius Korando Turismo (in South Korea); Rodius Turismo (in UK)

== See also ==
- List of Mercedes-Benz transmissions
