= Mercedes-Benz 4G-Tronic transmission =

4-speed automatic from 1979 with 5-speed variant from 1990

Mercedes-Benz W4A 040 · W4A 020 W4A 028 · W5A 030

Overview
- Manufacturer: Daimler AG
- Model code: W4A 040 · Type 722.3; W4A 020 · Type 722.4; W4A 028 · Type 722.3; W5A 030 · Type 722.5
- Production: 1979–1996

Body and chassis
- Class: 4- and 5-speed longitudinal automatic transmission
- Related: ZF 4HP

Chronology
- Predecessor: Mercedes-Benz first series automatic transmission
- Successor: 5G-Tronic

Mercedes-Benz 4G-Tronic transmission is the unofficial name given to the transmission by car enthusiasts. At Mercedes-Benz referred to as 3rd automatic transmission generation, it was produced from 1979 to 1996 in 4-speed variants W4A 040, W4A 028 (both type 722.3), W4A 020 (type 722.4), and from 1990 on in a 5-speed variant W5A 030 (type 722.5).

== Key data ==
Gear ratios (Note: Differences in gear ratios have a measurable, direct impact on vehicle dynamics, performance, waste emissions as well as fuel mileage)
Model	Type	First Deliv- ery	Gear						Total Span			Avg. Step	Components		Nomenclature			
Model	Type	First Deliv- ery	R	1	2	3	4	5	Nomi- nal	Effec- tive	Cen- ter	Avg. Step	Total	per Gear (Note: Forward gears only)	Cou- pling	Gears Count	Ver- sion	Maximum Input Torque
W4A 040 I	722.3	1979	−5.139	3.676	2.412	1.436	1.000		3.676	3.676	1.917	1.543	3 Gearsets; 3 Brakes; 2 Clutches	2.000	W (Note: Torque converter · German: Wandler or Drehmomentwandler)	4	A	40 kp⋅m (392 N⋅m; 289 lb⋅ft)
W4A 020	722.4	1982	−5.669	4.249	2.408	1.487	1.000		4.249	4.249	2.061	1.620	3 Gearsets; 3 Brakes; 2 Clutches	2.000	W	4	A	20 kp⋅m (196 N⋅m; 145 lb⋅ft)
W4A 040 II	722.3	1985 (Note: W4A 040 II: 1985 for 5.5 L engine · 1988 for gasoline engines from 2.8 L to 5.0 L & for turbocharged diesel engines)	−5.586	3.871	2.247	1.436	1.000		3.871	3.871	1.967	1.570	3 Gearsets; 3 Brakes; 2 Clutches	2.000	W	4	A	40 kp⋅m (392 N⋅m; 289 lb⋅ft)
W4A 028 (Note: W4A 028: for off-road applications (RWD and 4X4))	722.3	1990	−5.586	3.871	2.247	1.436	1.000		3.871	3.871	1.967	1.570	3 Gearsets; 3 Brakes; 2 Clutches	2.000	W	4	A	28 kp⋅m (275 N⋅m; 203 lb⋅ft)
W5A 030	722.5	1990	−5.586	3.871	2.247	1.436	1.000	0.750	5.161	5.161	1.704	1.507	4 Gearsets; 4 Brakes; 3 Clutches	2.200	W	5	A	30 kp⋅m (294 N⋅m; 217 lb⋅ft)

== History ==
The W4A 040 and the W4A 020 were used until mid-1996. The W4A 028 variant was used for off-road applications (RWD and 4X4). The W5A 030 is basically the same transmission with an additional electrically controlled 5th gear overdrive section attached to the main body in a separate housing; it was available as an extra charge option. All 4G-Tronics were succeeded by the more modern and economic 5G-Tronic (Type 722.6) transmission that features an integrated 5th gear overdrive ratio, torque converter lock-up and fully electronic control.

From 1984 to 1991, the W4A 040 was available as an optional extra for the Porsche 928.

== Specifications ==
The 4G-Tronic transmission is a hydraulically operated 4-speed automatic without lock-up that replaced the similarly designed W3A 040, W3B 050, and W4B 025 family of automatic transmissions with the introduction of the W126 S-Class in 1979. In some models it is calibrated to move off in second gear to reduce "creeping" and provide a smoother ride, selecting 1st only if the selector is in "2" or in case of abrupt acceleration. Other calibrations have the transmission rest in 2nd gear and kick down to 1st as soon as the accelerator is touched but before the throttle is opened. In some V8 installations a small control unit activates the kick down solenoid when the brake pedal is released so that the car moves off in 1st gear. Other attributes of this transmission include a 2-3 shift delay when the engine is cold in order to speed up catalyst warm-up. 4th gear is a 1:1 ratio. Controls are all mechanical and pneumatic, except for the kickdown solenoid and 2-3 upshift delay solenoid on some models.

In some markets a W-S (Winter - Standard / Sport) switch was provided on the shifter. Activating S mode changes a linkage which effectively shortens the throttle pressure bowden cable. This causes later, higher RPM shifts and on some models a move off in 1st gear instead of 2nd. On V8 models a B (Brake) range is available on the shifter. This activates the kickdown solenoid, forcing the transmission to shift down to 1st sooner for increased engine braking. A hydraulically activated piston prevents shifting into Reverse when the car is moving forward.

Models from 1990 and earlier allow for push starting the engine. They are fitted with a secondary fluid pump, driven by the transmission output shaft. When the vehicle is rolling at 20 mph shifting from Neutral to the 2 range will couple power to the engine. The secondary pump and thus the push starting facility was eliminated for the 1991 model year.

It is considered by enthusiasts to be one of the most reliable transmissions ever built by Mercedes-Benz with some examples exceeding 300,000 miles of service.

== Planetary gearset concept ==
=== W4A models: manufacturing complexity ===
"To simplify production, the front group is now formed by a Ravigneaux set, which is immediately followed by the second group. This largely eliminates the need for hollow shafts and other connecting bells, which are so commonly found in planetary gearboxes. Where possible, sheet metal or die-cast parts are used. Cost-intensive material machining is limited to the manufacture of gears, shafts, and bolts." (Note: · p. 453 · German: "Zur Fertigungsvereinfachung wird die vordere Gruppe jetzt von einem Ravigneaux-Satz gebildet, dem die zweite Gruppe unmittelbar folgt. Damit sind Hohlwellen und andere Verbindungsglocken, die sich in Planetengetrieben so ausgiebig finden, weitgend vermieden. Wo möglich, sind Blechform- oder Druckgussteile verwendet. Die kosteninsive Materialzerspanung beschränkt sich auf die Herstellung der Zahnräder, Wellen, Bolzen." Translated with DeepL.com (free version))

Planetary gearset concept: manufacturing complexity (Note: Progress increases cost-effectiveness and is reflected in the ratio of forward gears to main components. It depends on the power flow: parallel: using the two degrees of freedom of planetary gearsets; to increase the number of gears; with unchanged number of components; serial: in-line combined planetary gearsets without using the two degrees of freedom; to increase the number of gears; a corresponding increase in the number of components is unavoidable)
With Assessment	Output: Gear Ratios	Innovation Elasticity (Note: Innovation elasticity classifies progress and market position: Automobile manufacturers drive forward technical developments primarily in order to remain competitive or to achieve or defend technological leadership. This technical progress has therefore always been subject to economic constraints; Only innovations whose relative additional benefit is greater than the relative additional resource input, i.e. whose economic elasticity is greater than 1, are considered for realization; The required innovation elasticity of an automobile manufacturer depends on its expected return on investment. The basic assumption that the relative additional benefit must be at least twice as high as the relative additional resource input helps with orientation; negative, if the output increases and the input decreases, is perfect; 2 or above is good; 1 or above is acceptable (red); below this is unsatisfactory (bold)) Δ Output : Δ Input	Input: Main Components			
With Assessment	Output: Gear Ratios	Innovation Elasticity Δ Output : Δ Input	Total	Gearsets	Brakes	Clutches
W4A Ref. Object	$n_{O1}$ $n_{O2}$	Topic	$n_I= n_G+$ $n_B+ n_C$	$n_{G1}$ $n_{G2}$	$n_{B1}$ $n_{B2}$	$n_{C1}$ $n_{C2}$
Δ Number	$n_{O1}- n_{O2}$	Topic	$n_{I1}- n_{I2}$	$n_{G1}- n_{G2}$	$n_{B1}- n_{B2}$	$n_{C1}- n_{C2}$
Relative Δ	Δ Output $\tfrac{n_{O1}- n_{O2}} {n_{O2}}$	$\tfrac{n_{O1}- n_{O2}} {n_{O2}}: \tfrac{n_{I1}- n_{I2}} {n_{I2}}$ $=\tfrac{n_{O1}- n_{O2}} {n_{O2}} \cdot \tfrac{n_{I2}} {n_{I1}- n_{I2}}$	Δ Input $\tfrac{n_{I1}- n_{I2}} {n_{I2}}$	$\tfrac{n_{G1}- n_{G2}} {n_{G2}}$	$\tfrac{n_{B1}- n_{B2}} {n_{B2}}$	$\tfrac{n_{C1}- n_{C2}} {n_{C2}}$
W4A W4B 025 (Note: Direct predecessor: To reflect the progress of the specific model change)	4 (Note: plus 1 reverse gear); 4	Progress	8; 8	3 (Note: of which 2 gearsets are combined as a compound Ravigneaux gearset); 3	3; 3	2; 2
Δ Number	0	Progress	0	0	0	0
Relative Δ	0.000 $\tfrac{0} {4}$	0.000 $\tfrac{0} {4} : \tfrac{0} {8}= \tfrac{0} {4} \cdot \tfrac{8} {0}= \tfrac{0} {0}$	0.000 $\tfrac{0} {8}$	0.000 $\tfrac{0} {3}$	0.000 $\tfrac{0} {3}$	0.000 $\tfrac{0} {2}$
W4A ZF 4HP 22	4; 4	Early Market Position	8; 10	3; 3	3; 4	2; 3
Δ Number	0	Early Market Position	–2	0	–1	–1
Relative Δ	0.000 $\tfrac{0} {4}$	0.000 $\tfrac{0} {4}: \tfrac{-2} {10}= \tfrac{0} {4} \cdot \tfrac{10} {-2}= \tfrac{0} {-8}$	−0.200 $\tfrac{-2} {10}$	0.000 $\tfrac{0} {3}$	−0.250 $\tfrac{-1} {4}$	−0.333 $\tfrac{-1} {3}$
W4A ZF 4HP 18	4; 4	Late Market Position	8; 7	3; 2	3; 2	2; 3
Δ Number	0	Late Market Position	1	1	1	–1
Relative Δ	0.000 $\tfrac{0} {4}$	0.000 $\tfrac{0} {4}: \tfrac{1} {7}= \tfrac{0} {4} \cdot \tfrac{7} {1}= \tfrac{0} {4}$	0.143 $\tfrac{1} {7}$	0.500 $\tfrac{1} {2}$	0.500 $\tfrac{1} {2}$	−0.333 $\tfrac{-1} {3}$
W4A 3-Speed (Note: Historical reference standard (benchmark): 3-speed transmissions with torque converters have established the modern market for automatic transmissions and thus made it possible in the first place, as this design proved to be a particularly successful compromise between cost and performance; It became the archetype and dominated the world market for around 3 decades, setting the standard for automatic transmissions. It was only when fuel consumption became the focus of interest that this design reached its limits, which is why it has now completely disappeared from the market; What has remained is the orientation that it offers as a reference standard (point of reference, benchmark) for this market for determining progressiveness and thus the market position of all other, later designs; All transmission variants consist of 7 main components; Typical examples are; Turbo-Hydramatic from GM; Cruise-O-Matic from Ford; TorqueFlite from Chrysler; Detroit Gear from BorgWarner for Studebaker; BW-35 from BorgWarner and as T35 from Aisin; 3N 71 from Nissan/Jatco; 3 HP from ZF Friedrichshafen; W3A 040 and W3B 050 from Mercedes-Benz)	4; 3	Historical Market Position	8; 7	3; 2	3; 3	2; 2
Δ Number	1	Historical Market Position	1	1	0	0
Relative Δ	0.333 $\tfrac{1} {3}$	2.333 $\tfrac{1} {3}: \tfrac{1} {7}= \tfrac{1} {3} \cdot \tfrac{7} {1}= \tfrac{7} {3}$	0.143 $\tfrac{1} {7}$	0.500 $\tfrac{1} {2}$	0.000 $\tfrac{0} {3}$	0.000 $\tfrac{0} {2}$

=== W5A: manufacturing complexity ===
The need of 2 housings (Note: regular bousing for gear 1 to 4 and reverse gear · supplemental housing for gear 5) and 2 different controls (Note: hydraulic for gear 1 to 4 and reverse gear · electronic for gear 5) turn out the W5A 030 as the least economically designed automatic transmission ever manufactured for passenger cars. Obviously a transition solution: the direct successor, launched in 1996, requires 9 main components, (Note: 3 simple planetary gearsets, 3 brakes, 3 clutches) 1 housing and 1 control. (Note: electronic)

Planetary gearset concept: manufacturing complexity (Note: Progress increases cost-effectiveness and is reflected in the ratio of forward gears to main components. It depends on the power flow: parallel: using the two degrees of freedom of planetary gearsets; to increase the number of gears; with unchanged number of components; serial: in-line combined planetary gearsets without using the two degrees of freedom; to increase the number of gears; a corresponding increase in the number of components is unavoidable)
With Assessment	Output: Gear Ratios	Innovation Elasticity (Note: Innovation elasticity classifies progress and market position: Automobile manufacturers drive forward technical developments primarily in order to remain competitive or to achieve or defend technological leadership. This technical progress has therefore always been subject to economic constraints; Only innovations whose relative additional benefit is greater than the relative additional resource input, i.e. whose economic elasticity is greater than 1, are considered for realization; The required innovation elasticity of an automobile manufacturer depends on its expected return on investment. The basic assumption that the relative additional benefit must be at least twice as high as the relative additional resource input helps with orientation; negative, if the output increases and the input decreases, is perfect; 2 or above is good; 1 or above is acceptable (red); below this is unsatisfactory (bold)) Δ Output : Δ Input	Input: Main Components			
With Assessment	Output: Gear Ratios	Innovation Elasticity Δ Output : Δ Input	Total	Gearsets	Brakes	Clutches
W5A Ref. Object	$n_{O1}$ $n_{O2}$	Topic	$n_I= n_G+$ $n_B+ n_C$	$n_{G1}$ $n_{G2}$	$n_{B1}$ $n_{B2}$	$n_{C1}$ $n_{C2}$
Δ Number	$n_{O1}- n_{O2}$	Topic	$n_{I1}- n_{I2}$	$n_{G1}- n_{G2}$	$n_{B1}- n_{B2}$	$n_{C1}- n_{C2}$
Relative Δ	Δ Output $\tfrac{n_{O1}- n_{O2}} {n_{O2}}$	$\tfrac{n_{O1}- n_{O2}} {n_{O2}}: \tfrac{n_{I1}- n_{I2}} {n_{I2}}$ $=\tfrac{n_{O1}- n_{O2}} {n_{O2}} \cdot \tfrac{n_{I2}} {n_{I1}- n_{I2}}$	Δ Input $\tfrac{n_{I1}- n_{I2}} {n_{I2}}$	$\tfrac{n_{G1}- n_{G2}} {n_{G2}}$	$\tfrac{n_{B1}- n_{B2}} {n_{B2}}$	$\tfrac{n_{C1}- n_{C2}} {n_{C2}}$
W5A W4A (Note: Direct predecessor: To reflect the progress of the specific model change)	5 (Note: plus 1 reverse gear); 4	Progress	11; 8	4 (Note: of which 2 gearsets are combined as a compound Ravigneaux gearset); 3	4; 3	3; 2
Δ Number	1	Progress	3	1	1	1
Relative Δ	0.250 $\tfrac{1} {4}$	0.667 $\tfrac{1} {4} : \tfrac{3} {8}= \tfrac{1} {4} \cdot \tfrac{8} {3}= \tfrac{2} {3}$	0.375 $\tfrac{3} {8}$	0.333 $\tfrac{1} {3}$	0.333 $\tfrac{1} {3}$	0.500 $\tfrac{1} {2}$
W5A ZF 5HP 18	5; 5	Early Market Position	11; 10	4; 3	4; 3	3; 4
Δ Number	0	Early Market Position	1	1	1	–1
Relative Δ	0.000 $\tfrac{0} {5}$	0.000 $\tfrac{0} {5}: \tfrac{1} {10}= \tfrac{0} {5} \cdot \tfrac{10} {1}= \tfrac{0} {1}$	0.100 $\tfrac{1} {10}$	0.333 $\tfrac{1} {3}$	1.000 $\tfrac{2} {2}$	−0.250 $\tfrac{-1} {4}$
W5A ZF 5HP 30	5; 5	Late Market Position	11; 9	4; 3	4; 3	3; 3
Δ Number	0	Late Market Position	2	1	1	0
Relative Δ	0.000 $\tfrac{0} {5}$	0.000 $\tfrac{0} {5}: \tfrac{2} {9}= \tfrac{0} {5} \cdot \tfrac{9} {2}= \tfrac{0} {1}$	0.222 $\tfrac{2} {9}$	0.333 $\tfrac{1} {3}$	0.333 $\tfrac{1} {3}$	0.000 $\tfrac{0} {4}$
W5A 3-Speed (Note: Historical reference standard (benchmark): 3-speed transmissions with torque converters have established the modern market for automatic transmissions and thus made it possible in the first place, as this design proved to be a particularly successful compromise between cost and performance; It became the archetype and dominated the world market for around 3 decades, setting the standard for automatic transmissions. It was only when fuel consumption became the focus of interest that this design reached its limits, which is why it has now completely disappeared from the market; What has remained is the orientation that it offers as a reference standard (point of reference, benchmark) for this market for determining progressiveness and thus the market position of all other, later designs; All transmission variants consist of 7 main components; Typical examples are; Turbo-Hydramatic from GM; Cruise-O-Matic from Ford; TorqueFlite from Chrysler; Detroit Gear from BorgWarner for Studebaker; BW-35 from BorgWarner and as T35 from Aisin; 3N 71 from Nissan/Jatco; 3 HP from ZF Friedrichshafen; W3A 040 and W3B 050 from Mercedes-Benz)	5; 3	Historical Market Position	11; 7	4; 2	4; 3	3; 2
Δ Number	2	Historical Market Position	4	2	1	1
Relative Δ	0.667 $\tfrac{2} {3}$	1.167 $\tfrac{2} {3}: \tfrac{4} {7}= \tfrac{2} {3} \cdot \tfrac{7} {4}= \tfrac{7} {6}$	0.571 $\tfrac{4} {7}$	1.000 $\tfrac{2} {2}$	0.333 $\tfrac{1} {3}$	0.500 $\tfrac{1} {2}$

=== Quality ===
The most obvious flaw of the gearset concept is the second gear, which is clearly too short, but this affected all Mercedes-Benz transmissions, especially automatic transmissions. "The manual transmission plays a key role in the positive impression made by the small V8 engine in the large S-Class sedan. It simply suits the sporty performance characteristics of the engine better than the automatic transmission, although there is still room for improvement in terms of gear ratios. 2nd gear in particular seems a little too short with a range of only 90 km/h." (Note: Since 2nd gear is even longer in the tested manual transmission than in the automatic transmission, the test report can be cited here. The ratios are: 3.96–2.34–1.43–1.00 compared to those for the automatic transmission of 3.98–2.39–1.46–1.00 · German: "An dem positiven Eindruck, den der kleine V8-Motor in der großen S-Limousine hinterlässt, ist das Schaltgetriebe maßgeblich beteiligt. Es passt ganz einfach besser zu der sportlichen Leistungscharakteristik des Motors als die Automatik, wobei hinsichtlich der Übersetzung durchaus noch Wünsche offenbleiben. Besonders der II. Gang erscheint mit seiner Reichweite von nur 90 km/h etwas zu kurz geraten." Translated with DeepL.com (free version))

After Hans-Joachim Foerster, the originator of this flawed gear ratio, left the company in November 1982, Mercedes-Benz began to address this problem. This led to the introduction of the W4A 040 II with modified gear ratios in 1985. With the 7G-Tronic transmission from 2003, they finally succeeded in completely resolving this issue.

Planetary gearset concept: gear ratio quality (Note: Revised 14 January 2026 Nomenclature: $S_n =$ sun gear: number of teeth; $R_n =$ ring gear: number of teeth; $\color{gray}{C_n = }$ carrier or planetary gear carrier (not needed); $s_n =$ sun gear: shaft speed; $r_n =$ ring gear: shaft speed; $c_n =$ carrier or planetary gear carrier: shaft speed; With $n =$ gear is: $i_n =$ gear ratio or transmission ratio; $\omega_{1;n} = \omega_t =$ shaft speed shaft 1: input (turbine) shaft; $\omega_{2;n} =$ shaft speed shaft 2: output shaft; $T_{1;n} = T_t =$ torque shaft 1: input (turbine) shaft; $T_{2;n} =$ torque shaft 2: output shaft; $\mu_n =$ torque ratio or torque conversion ratio; $\eta_n =$ efficiency; $i_0 =$ stationary gear ratio; $\eta_0 =$ (assumed) stationary gear efficiency)
In-Depth Analysis (Note: Gear ratio (transmission ratio) $i_n$ — speed conversion —: The gear ratio $i_n$ is the ratio of; input shaft speed $\omega_{1;n}$; to output shaft speed $\omega_{2;n}$; and therefore corresponds to the reciprocal of the shaft speeds; $i_n = \frac{1} {\frac{\omega_{2;n}} {\omega_{1;n}}} = \frac{\omega_{1;n}} {\omega_{2;n}} = \frac{\omega_t} {\omega_{2;n}}$) With Assessment And Torque Ratio (Note: Torque ratio (torque conversion ratio) $\mu_n$ — Torque Conversion —: The torque ratio $\mu_n$ is the ratio of; output torque $T_{2;n}$; to input torque $T_{1;n}$; minus efficiency losses; and therefore corresponds (apart from the efficiency losses) to the reciprocal of the shaft speeds too; $\mu_n = i_n \eta_{n;\eta_0} = \frac{\omega_{1;n} \eta_{n;\eta_0}} {\omega_{2;n}} = \frac{T_{2;n} \eta_{n;\eta_0}} {T_{1;n}}$; whereby $\eta_{n;\eta_0}$ may vary from gear to gear according to the formulas listed in this table and $0 \le \eta_{n;\eta_0} \le 1$) And Efficiency Calculation (Note: Efficiency: The efficiency $\eta_n$ is calculated; from the torque ratio; in relation to the gear ratio (transmission ratio); $\eta_n = \frac{\mu_n} {i_n}$; Power loss for single meshing gears; is in the range of 1 % to 1.5 %; helical gear pairs, which are used to reduce noise in passenger cars, are in the upper part of the loss range; spur gear pairs, which are limited to commercial vehicles due to their poorer noise comfort, are in the lower part of the loss range; Corridor for torque ratio and efficiency: in planetary gearsets, the stationary gear ratio $i_0$ is formed via the planetary gears and thus by two meshes; for reasons of simplification, the efficiency for both meshes together is commonly specified there; the efficiencies $\eta_0$ specified here are based on assumed efficiencies for the stationary ratio $i_0$; of $\eta_0 = 0.9800$ (upper value); and $\eta_0 = 0.9700$ (lower value); for both interventions together; The corresponding efficiency; for single-meshing gear pairs is ${\eta_0}^\tfrac {1}{2}$; at $0.9800^\tfrac{1} {2} = 0.98995$ (upper value); and $0.9700^\tfrac{1} {2} = 0.98489$ (lower value))		Planetary Gearset: Teeth (Note: Layout: Input and output are on opposite sides; Planetary gearset 1 (the inner Ravigneaux gearset) is on the input (turbine) side; Input (turbine) shafts is S_{2}; Output shaft is C_{3}; Output shaft W5A 030 is R_{4})				Count	Nomi- nal (Note: Total ratio span (total gear ratio/total transmission ratio) nominal: $\frac{\omega_{2;n}} {\omega_{2;1}} = \frac{\frac{\omega_{2;n}} {\omega_{2;1} \omega_{2;n}}} {\frac{\omega_{2;1}} {\omega_{2;1} \omega_{2;n}}} = \frac{\frac{1} {\omega_{2;1}}} {\frac{1} {\omega_{2;n}}} = \frac{\frac{\omega_t} {\omega_{2;1}}} {\frac{\omega_t} {\omega_{2;n}}} = \frac{i_1} {i_n}$; A wider span enables the; downspeeding when driving outside the city limits; increase the climbing ability; when driving over mountain passes or off-road; or when towing a trailer) Effec- tive (Note: Total ratio span (total gear ratio/total transmission ratio) effective: $\frac{\omega_{2;n}} {max(\omega_{2;1};|\omega_{2;R}|)} = \frac{min(i_1;|i_R|)} {i_n}$; The span is only effective to the extent that; the reverse gear ratio; matches that of 1st gear; see also Standard R:1; Digression Reverse gear: is usually longer than 1st gear; the effective span is therefore of central importance for describing the suitability of a transmission; because in these cases, the nominal spread conveys a misleading picture; which is only unproblematic for vehicles with high specific power; Market participants: Manufacturers naturally have no interest in specifying the effective span; Users have not yet formulated the practical benefits that the effective span has for them; The effective span has not yet played a role in research and teaching; Contrary to its significance: the effective span has therefore not yet been able to establish itself; either in theory; or in practice.; End of digression)	Cen- ter (Note: Ratio span's center: $(i_1 i_n)^\frac{1} {2}$; The center indicates the speed level of the transmission; Together with the final drive ratio; it gives the shaft speed level of the vehicle)
In-Depth Analysis With Assessment And Torque Ratio And Efficiency Calculation		Ravigneaux		Simple		Count	Nomi- nal Effec- tive	Avg. (Note: Average gear step: $\left( \frac{\omega_{2;n}} {\omega_{2;1}} \right) ^\frac{1} {n-1} = \left( \frac{i_1} {i_n} \right) ^\frac{1} {n-1}$; There are $n-1$ gear steps between $n$ gears; with decreasing step width; the gears connect better to each other; shifting comfort increases)
Model Type	Version First Delivery	S_{1} (Note: Sun 1: sun gear of gearset 1: inner Ravigneaux gearset) R_{1} (Note: Ring 1: ring gear of gearset 1: inner Ravigneaux gearset)	S_{2} (Note: Sun 2: sun gear of gearset 2: outer Ravigneaux gearset) R_{2} (Note: Ring 2: ring gear of gearset 2: outer Ravigneaux gearset)	S_{3} (Note: Sun 3: sun gear of gearset 3) R_{3} (Note: Ring 3: ring gear of gearset 3)	S_{4} (Note: Sun 4: sun gear of gearset 4 · W5A 030 only) R_{4} (Note: Ring 4: ring gear of gearset 4 · W5A 030 only)	Brakes Clutches	Ratio Span	Gear Step (Note: Standard 50:50 — 50 % is above and 50 % is below the average gear step —: With steadily decreasing gear steps (yellow highlighted line Step); and a particularly large step from 1st to 2nd gear; the lower half of the gear steps (between the small gears; rounded down, here the first 1 · W5A 030: the first 2) is always larger; and the upper half of the gear steps (between the large gears; rounded up, here the last 2) is always smaller; than the average gear step (cell highlighted yellow two rows above on the far right); lower half: smaller gear steps are a waste of possible ratios (red bold); upper half: larger gear steps are unsatisfactory (red bold))
Gear		R		1	2	3	4	5
Gear Ratio		${i_R}$		${i_1}$	${i_2}$	${i_3}$	${i_4}$	${i_5}$
Step		$-\frac{i_R} {i_1}$ (Note: Standard R:1 — reverse and 1st gear have the same ratio —: The ideal reverse gear has the same transmission ratio as 1st gear; no impairment when maneuvering; especially when towing a trailer; a torque converter can only partially compensate for this deficiency; Plus 11.11 % minus 10 % compared to 1st gear is good; Plus 25 % minus 20 % is acceptable (red); Above this is unsatisfactory (bold); see also Total ratio span (total gear ratio/total transmission Ratio) effective)		$\frac{i_1} {i_1}$	$\frac{i_1} {i_2}$ (Note: Standard 1:2 — gear step 1st to 2nd gear as small as possible —: With continuously decreasing gear steps (yellow marked line Step); the largest gear step is the one from 1st to 2nd gear, which; for a good speed connection and; a smooth gear shift; must be as small as possible; A gear ratio of up to 1.6667 : 1 (5 : 3) is good; Up to 1.7500 : 1 (7 : 4) is acceptable (red); Above is unsatisfactory (bold))	$\frac{i_2} {i_3}$	$\frac{i_3} {i_4}$	$\frac{i_4} {i_5}$
Δ Step (Note: From large to small gears (from right to left)) (Note: Standard STEP — from large to small gears: steady and progressive increase in gear steps —: Gear steps should; increase: Δ Step (first green highlighted line Δ Step) is always greater than 1; As progressive as possible: Δ Step is always greater than the previous step; Not progressively increasing is acceptable (red); Not increasing is unsatisfactory (bold))					$\tfrac{i_1} {i_2} : \tfrac{i_2} {i_3}$	$\tfrac{i_2} {i_3} : \tfrac{i_3} {i_4}$	$\tfrac{i_3} {i_4} : \tfrac{i_4} {i_5}$	
Shaft Speed		$\frac{i_1} {i_R}$		$\frac{i_1} {i_1}$	$\frac{i_1} {i_2}$	$\frac{i_1} {i_3}$	$\frac{i_1} {i_4}$	$\frac{i_1} {i_5}$
Δ Shaft Speed (Note: Standard SPEED — from small to large gears: steady increase in shaft speed difference —: Shaft speed differences should; increase: Δ Shaft Speed (second line marked in green Δ (Shaft) Speed) is always greater than the previous one; 1 difference smaller than the previous one is acceptable (red); 2 consecutive ones are a waste of possible ratios (bold))		$0 - \tfrac{i_1} {i_R}$		$\tfrac{i_1} {i_1} - 0$	$\tfrac{i_1} {i_2} - \tfrac{i_1} {i_1}$	$\tfrac{i_1} {i_3} - \tfrac{i_1} {i_2}$	$\tfrac{i_1} {i_4} - \tfrac{i_1} {i_3}$	$\tfrac{i_1} {i_5} - \tfrac{i_1} {i_4}$
Torque Ratio		$\mu_R$		$\mu_1$	$\mu_2$	$\mu_3$	$\mu_4$	$\mu_5$
Efficiency $\eta_n$		$\frac{\mu_R} {i_R}$		$\frac{\mu_1} {i_1}$	$\frac{\mu_2} {i_2}$	$\frac{\mu_3} {i_3}$	$\frac{\mu_4} {i_4}$	$\frac{\mu_5} {i_5}$
W4A 040 I 722.3	40 kp⋅m (392 N⋅m; 289 lb⋅ft); 1979 (Note: pp. 192 & 456)	34; 50	50; 78	34; 78		3; 2	3.6759; 3.6759	1.9173
W4A 040 I 722.3	40 kp⋅m (392 N⋅m; 289 lb⋅ft); 1979	34; 50	50; 78	34; 78		3; 2	3.6759; 3.6759	1.5433
Gear		R		1	2	3	4	5
Gear Ratio		−5.1388 $-\tfrac{2,184}{425}$		3.6759 $\tfrac{3,584}{975}$	2.4123 $\tfrac{784}{325}$	1.4359 $\tfrac{56}{39}$	1.0000 $\tfrac{1}{1}$	
Step		1.3980		1.0000	1.5238	1.6800	1.4359	
Δ Step					0.9070	1.1700		
Speed		–0.7153		1.0000	1.5238	2.5600	3.6759	
Δ Speed		0.7153		1.0000	0.5238	1.0362	1.1159	
Torque Ratio		–4.9659 –4.8805		3.6091; 3.5758	2.3687; 2.3471	1.4272; 1.4228	1.0000	
Efficiency $\eta_n$		0.9664; 0.9497		0.9818; 0.9728	0.9819; 0.9730	0.9939; 0.9909	1.0000	
W4A 020 722.4	20 kp⋅m (196 N⋅m; 145 lb⋅ft); 1982	26; 42	42; 78	38; 78		3; 2	4.2491; 4.2491	2.0613
W4A 020 722.4	20 kp⋅m (196 N⋅m; 145 lb⋅ft); 1982	26; 42	42; 78	38; 78		3; 2	4.2491; 4.2491	1.6197
Gear		R		1	2	3	4	5
Gear Ratio		−5.6692 $-\tfrac{754}{133}$		4.2491 $\tfrac{1,160}{273}$	2.4078 $\tfrac{1,972}{819}$	1.4872 $\tfrac{58}{39}$	1.0000 $\tfrac{1}{1}$	
Step		1.3342		1.0000	1.7647	1.6190	1.4872	
Δ Step					1.0900	1.0887		
Speed		–0.7153		1.0000	1.7647	2.8571	4.2491	
Δ Speed		0.7153		1.0000	0.7647	1.0924	1.3919	
Torque Ratio		–5.4811 –5.3882		4.1664; 4.1253	2.3647; 2.3434	1.4774; 1.4726	1.0000	
Efficiency $\eta_n$		0.9668; 0.9504		0.9805; 0.9709	0.9821; 0.9733	0.9934; 0.9902	1.0000	
W4A 040 II 722.3	40 kp⋅m (392 N⋅m; 289 lb⋅ft); 1985; 1988 (Note: W4A 040 II: 1985 for 5.5 L engine · 1988 for gasoline engines from 2.8 L to 5.0 L & for turbocharged diesel engines)	26; 46	46; 78	34; 78		3; 2	3.8707; 3.8707	1.9674
W4A 040 II 722.3	40 kp⋅m (392 N⋅m; 289 lb⋅ft); 1985; 1988	26; 46	46; 78	34; 78		3; 2	3.8707; 3.8707	1.5701
Gear		R		1	2	3	4	5
Gear Ratio		−5.5857		3.8707	2.2475	1.4359	1.0000	
W4A 028 722.3 (Note: W4A 028: for off-road applications (RWD and 4X4))	28 kp⋅m (275 N⋅m; 203 lb⋅ft); 1990	26; 46	46; 78	34; 78		3; 2	3.8707	1.9674
W4A 028 722.3	28 kp⋅m (275 N⋅m; 203 lb⋅ft); 1990	26; 46	46; 78	34; 78		3; 2	3.8707	1.5701
Gear		R		1	2	3	4	5
Gear Ratio		−5.5857		3.8707	2.2475	1.4359	1.0000	
W5A 030 722.5	30 kp⋅m (294 N⋅m; 217 lb⋅ft); 1990	26; 46	46; 78	34; 78	26; 78	4; 3	5.1609; 5.1609	1.7038
W5A 030 722.5	30 kp⋅m (294 N⋅m; 217 lb⋅ft); 1990	26; 46	46; 78	34; 78	26; 78	4; 3	5.1609; 5.1609	1.5072
Gear		R		1	2	3	4	5
Gear Ratio		−5.5857 $-\tfrac{2,184}{391}$		3.8707 $\tfrac{3,472}{897}$	2.2475 $\tfrac{672}{299}$	1.4359 $\tfrac{56}{39}$	1.0000 $\tfrac{1}{1}$	0.7500 $\tfrac{3}{4}$
Step		1.4431		1.0000	1.7222	1.5652	1.4359	1.3333
Δ Step					1.1003	1.0901	1.0769	
Speed		–0.6930		1.0000	1.7222	2.6957	3.8707	5.1609
Δ Speed		0.6930		1.0000	0.7222	0.9734	1.1750	1.2902
Torque Ratio		–5.3977 –5.3049		3.7988; 3.7631	2.2098; 2.1911	1.4272; 1.4228	1.0000	0.7462; 0.7442
Efficiency $\eta_n$		0.9664; 0.9497		0.9814; 0.9722	0.9832; 0.9749	0.9939; 0.9909	1.0000	0.9949; 0.9923
Actuated shift elements
Brake A (Note: Blocks S_{1} (sun gear of the inner Ravigneaux gearset))					❶			
Brake B (Note: Blocks S_{3})				❶	❶	❶		
Brake R (Note: Blocks C_{1}/C_{2} (the common carrier of the compound Ravigneaux gearset))		❶						
Brake S (Note: Blocks S_{4} (Overdrive: German: S for "schnell", fast) · W5A 030 only)								❶ (Note: W5A 030 only)
Clutch E (Note: Couples S_{1} (the sun gear of the inner Ravigneaux gearset) with C_{1}/C_{2} (the common carrier of the compound Ravigneaux gearset))						❶	❶	❶
Clutch F (Note: Couples R_{2} and S_{3})		❶		❶			❶	❶
Clutch S (Note: Couples S_{4} with R_{4} (Overdrive: German: S for "schnell", fast) · W5A 030 only)		❶		❶	❶	❶	❶	
Geometric ratios: speed conversion
Gear Ratio R & 3 Ordinary (Note: Ordinary Noted: For direct determination of the gear ratio) Elementary Noted (Note: Elementary Noted: Alternative representation for determining the transmission ratio; Contains only operands; With simple fractions of both central gears of a planetary gearset; Or with the value 1; As a basis; For reliable; And traceable; Determination of the torque ratio and efficiency)	${i_R} = -\frac{R_2 (S_3+ R_3)} {S_2 S_3}$					${i_3} = \frac{S_3+ R_3} {R_3}$		
Gear Ratio R & 3 Ordinary Elementary Noted	${i_R} = -\tfrac{R_2} {S_2} \left(1+ \tfrac{R_3} {S_3} \right)$					${i_3} = 1+ \tfrac{S_3} {R_3}$		
Gear Ratio 1 & 4 Ordinary Elementary Noted	${i_1} = \frac{(S_2+ R_2) (S_3+ R_3)} {S_2 R_3}$					${i_4} = \frac{1} {1}$		
Gear Ratio 1 & 4 Ordinary Elementary Noted	${i_1} = \left(1+ \tfrac{R_2} {S_2} \right) \left(1+ \tfrac{S_3} {R_3} \right)$					${i_4} = \frac{1} {1}$		
Gear Ratio 2 & 5 Ordinary Elementary Noted	${i_2} = \frac{(S_1+ R_1) (S_3+ R_3)} {R_1 R_3}$					${i_5} = \frac{R_4} {S_4+ R_4}$		
Gear Ratio 2 & 5 Ordinary Elementary Noted	${i_2} = \left(1+ \tfrac{S_1} {R_1} \right) \left(1+ \tfrac{S_3} {R_3} \right)$					${i_5} = \tfrac{1} {1+ \tfrac{S_4} {R_4}}$		
Kinetic ratios: torque conversion
Specific Torque R & 3	$\mu_R = -\tfrac{R_2} {S_2} \eta_0 \left(1+ \tfrac{R_3} {S_3} \eta_0 \right)$					$\mu_3 = 1+ \tfrac{S_3} {R_3} \eta_0$		
Specific Torque 1 & 4	$\mu_1 = \left(1+ \tfrac{R_2} {S_2} \eta_0 \right) \left(1+ \tfrac{S_3} {R_3} \eta_0 \right)$					$\mu_4 = \tfrac{1} {1}$		
Specific Torque 2 & 5	$\mu_2 = \left(1+ \tfrac{S_1} {R_1} {\eta_0}^ \tfrac{3} {2} \right) \left(1+ \tfrac{S_3} {R_3} \eta_0 \right)$					$\mu_5 = \tfrac{1} {1+ \tfrac{S_4} {R_4} \cdot \tfrac{1} {\eta_0}}$		

== Applications ==
Variants and applications
Model	Car Model (Note: without any claim of completeness)				
Model	Chassis code	Car model	Engine code	Transmission code	Notes
W4A 040 I+II (Type 722.3)
C-Class	1985–1993 W 201; 1993–1996 W 202				
E-Class	123.026	250	123.920; 123.921	722.308	
E-Class	123.086	250 T	123.920; 123.921	722.308	
E-Class	123.028	250 Lang	123.920; 123.921	722.308	
E-Class	123.033	280 E	110.984; 110.988	722.300; 722.309	
E-Class	123.093	280 TE	110.984; 110.988	722.309	
E-Class	123.053	280 CE	110.984; 110.988	722.300; 722.309	
E-Class	123.133	300 D Turbo	617.952	722.315 1982–1985	USA only
E-Class	123.153	300 CD Turbo	617.952	722.315 1982–1985	USA only
E-Class	123.193	300 TD Turbo	617.952	722.303 1981–1982; 722.315 1982–1985	USA only
E-Class	1985–1996 W 124; 1995–1996 W 210				
S-Class	1979–1991 W 126; 1981–1991 W 126 Coupé; 1991–1996 W 140; 1992–1996 C 140				
SL-Class	1981–1989 R 107 and C 107; 1989–1996 R 129				
Porsche	1984–1991 928				
W4A 028 (Type 722.3)
G-Class	1990–1996 463				
W4A 020 (Type 722.4)
C-Class	1982–1993 W 201; 1993–1996 W 202				
E-Class	123.220	200	102.920; 102.939	722.406	
E-Class	123.280	200 T	102.920; 102.939	722.406	
E-Class	123.223	230 E	102.980	722.401	
E-Class	123.283	230 TE	102.980	722.401	
E-Class	123.243	230 CE	102.980	722.401	
E-Class	123.120	200 D	615.940	722.407	
E-Class	123.123	240 D	616.912	722.404	
E-Class	123.183	240 TD	616.912	722.404	
E-Class	123.125	240 D Lang	616.912	722.404	
E-Class	123.130	300 D	617.912	722.405	
E-Class	123.190	300 TD	617.912	722.405	
E-Class	123.132	300 D Lang	617.912	722.405	
E-Class	123.133	300 D Turbo	617.952	722.416 1985	California only
E-Class	123.153	300 CD Turbo	617.952	722.416 1985	California only
E-Class	123.193	300 TD Turbo	617.952	722.416 1985	California only
E-Class	1985–1996 W 124; 1995–1996 W 210				
W5A 030 (Type 722.5)
E-Class	1990–1996 W 124; 1995–1996 W 210				
S-Class	1991–1996 W 140; 1992–1996 C 140				
SL-Class	1990–1996 R 129				

== See also ==
- List of Mercedes-Benz transmissions
