= Mercedes-Benz first series automatic transmission =

World's first 4-speed automatic from 1961

Mercedes-Benz K4A 025 K4B 050 · K4C 025 · K4A 040 W3A 040 · W3B 050 · W4B 025 W4A 018 · W4B 035
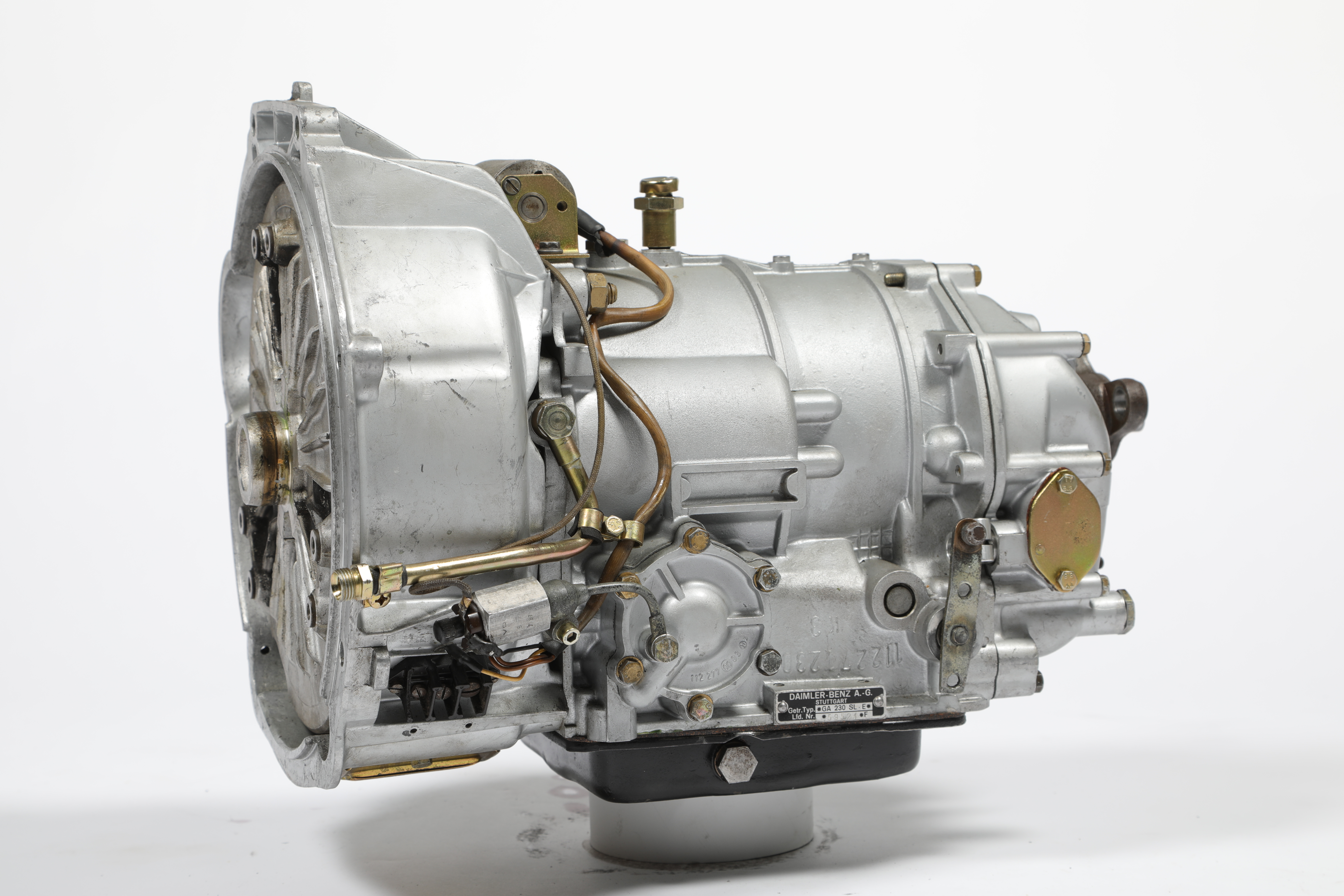
- K4A 025

Overview
- Manufacturer: Daimler AG
- Production: 1961–1983

Body and chassis
- Class: 4- and 3-speed longitudinal automatic transmission

Chronology
- Successor: 4G-Tronic

The Mercedes-Benz first series of automatic transmission was produced from 1961 to 1983 in two 4-speed designs, at Mercedes-Benz later referred to as 1st and 2nd automatic transmission generation, and a 3-speed variant of the second design for passenger cars. In addition, transmissions with the second 4-speed design were offered for commercial vehicles until the mid-1990s.

All these designs are for cars with a longitudinal engine, rear-wheel-drive layout. The control of the fully automatic system is fully hydraulic and it uses electrical wire only for the kickdown solenoid valve and the neutral safety switch.

Physically, it can be recognized for its pan which uses 16 bolts.

== Key data ==
Gear ratios (Note: Differences in gear ratios have a measurable, direct impact on vehicle dynamics, performance, waste emissions as well as fuel mileage)
Model Design	Type	First Deliv- ery	Gear					Total Span			Avg. Step	Components		Nomenclature			
Model Design	Type	First Deliv- ery	R	1	2	3	4	Nomi- nal	Effec- tive	Cen- ter	Avg. Step	Total	per Gear (Note: Forward gears only)	Cou- pling	Gears Count	Ver- sion	Maximum Input Torque
K4A 025 1st	w/o 1st (Note: 1st: at Mercedes-Benz later referred to as 1st automatic transmission generation)	1961	−4.145	3.979	2.520	1.579	1.000	3.979	3.979	1.995	1.585	2 Gearsets; 3 Brakes; 3 Clutches	2.000	K (Note: Fluid coupling · German: Kupplung or Flüssigkeitskupplung)	4	A	25 kp⋅m (181 lb⋅ft)
K4B 050 (Note: K4B 050: for the 6.3 L engine M 100 of the 600 and 300 SEL 6.3) 2nd	w/o 2nd (Note: 2nd: at Mercedes-Benz later referred to as 2nd automatic transmission generation)	1964 (Note: K4B 050: unveiled in September 1963 at the International Motor Show in Frankfurt, it went into production in September 1964)	−4.145	3.979	2.459	1.579	1.000	3.979	3.979	1.995	1.585	3 Gearsets; 3 Brakes; 2 Clutches	2.000	K	4	B	50 kp⋅m (362 lb⋅ft)
K4C 025 K4A 040 W4B 025 2nd	722.2; 722.2; 722.1; 2nd	1967; 1969; 1972	−5.478	3.983	2.386	1.461	1.000	3.983	3.983	1.996	1.585	3 Gearsets; 3 Brakes; 2 Clutches	2.000	K K W (Note: Torque converter · German: Wandler or Drehmomentwandler)	4	C A B	25 kp⋅m (181 lb⋅ft); 40 kp⋅m (289 lb⋅ft); 25 kp⋅m (181 lb⋅ft)
W4A 018 (Note: W4A 018: for light-duty trucks and vans up to 5,600 kg (12,350 lb) and off-road vehicles (Note: p. 487)) 2nd	720.1; 2nd	1975	−5.499	4.006	2.391	1.463	1.000	4.006	4.006	2.001	1.588	3 Gearsets; 3 Brakes; 2 Clutches	2.000	W	4	A	18 kp⋅m (130 lb⋅ft)
W4B 035 (Note: W4B 035: for medium-duty trucks up to 13,000 kg (28,660 lb) (Note: p. 489)) 2nd	TBD	1975	−5.881	4.176	2.412	1.462	1.000	4.176	4.176	2.043	1.610	3 Gearsets; 3 Brakes; 2 Clutches	2.000	W	4	B	35 kp⋅m (253 lb⋅ft)
W3A 040 W3A 050 W3A 050 reinf. (Note: W3A 050 reinforced: for the 6.8 L engine M 100 of the 450 SEL 6.9) 2nd	720.0; 722.0; 722.0; 2nd	1971; 1973; 1975	−1.836	2.306	1.461	1.000		2.306	1.836	1.519	1.519	2 Gearsets; 3 Brakes; 2 Clutches	2.333	W	3	A	40 kp⋅m (289 lb⋅ft); 50 kp⋅m (362 lb⋅ft); 56 kp⋅m (405 lb⋅ft)

== History ==
The K4A 025 was the first Mercedes automatic transmission developed in-house. Before this, the company used semi-automatic systems like a vacuum-powered shifting for overdrive or the "Hydrak" hydraulic automatic clutch system. Alternatively, they bought automatic transmissions of other vendors, such as the Detroit gear 3-speed automatic transmission from BorgWarner for the 300 c and 300 d (not to be confused with the later 300 D and its successors).

== 1st generation 1961: K4A 025 — first 4-speed design with 2 planetary gearsets — ==
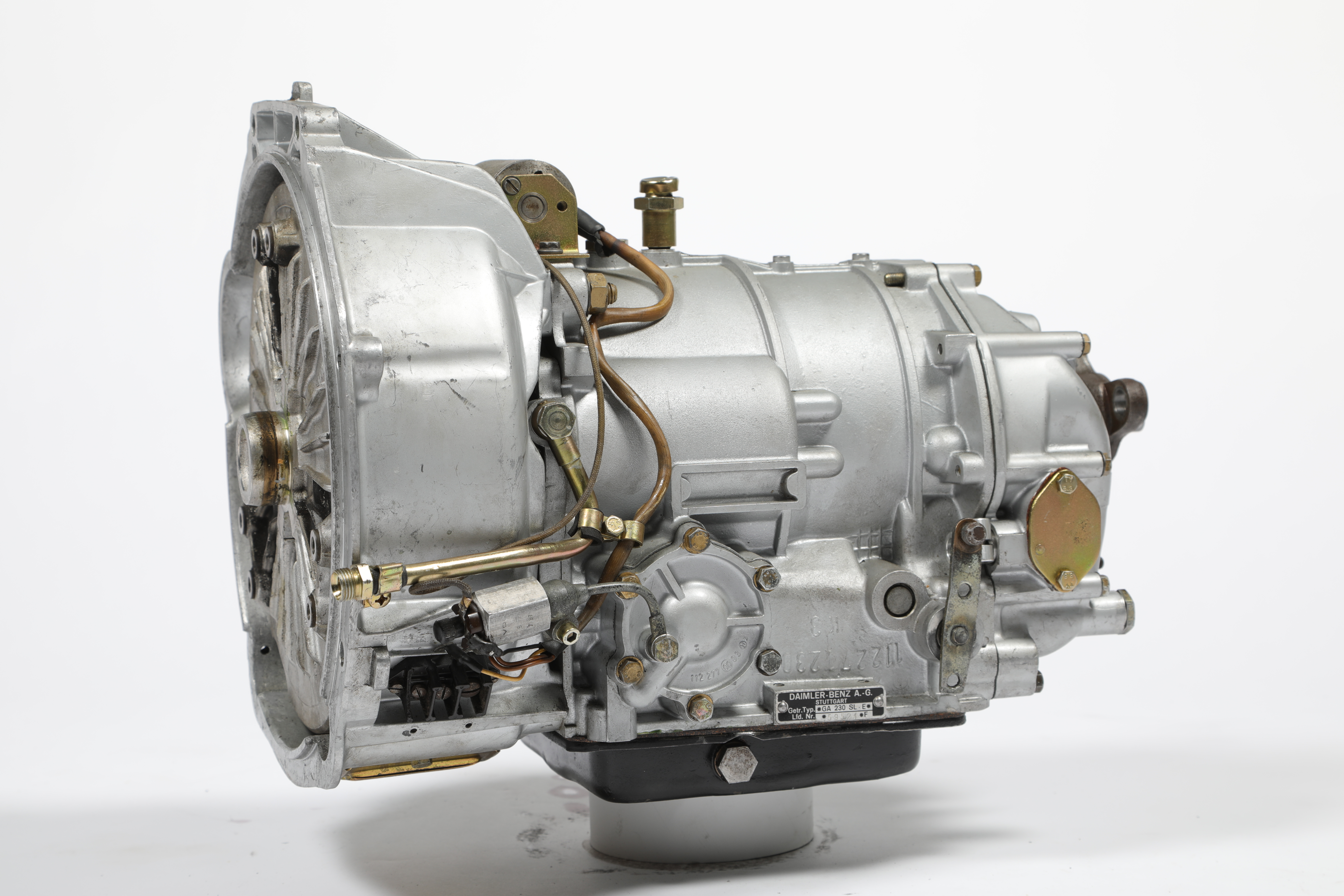
K4A 025 transmission left hand side view

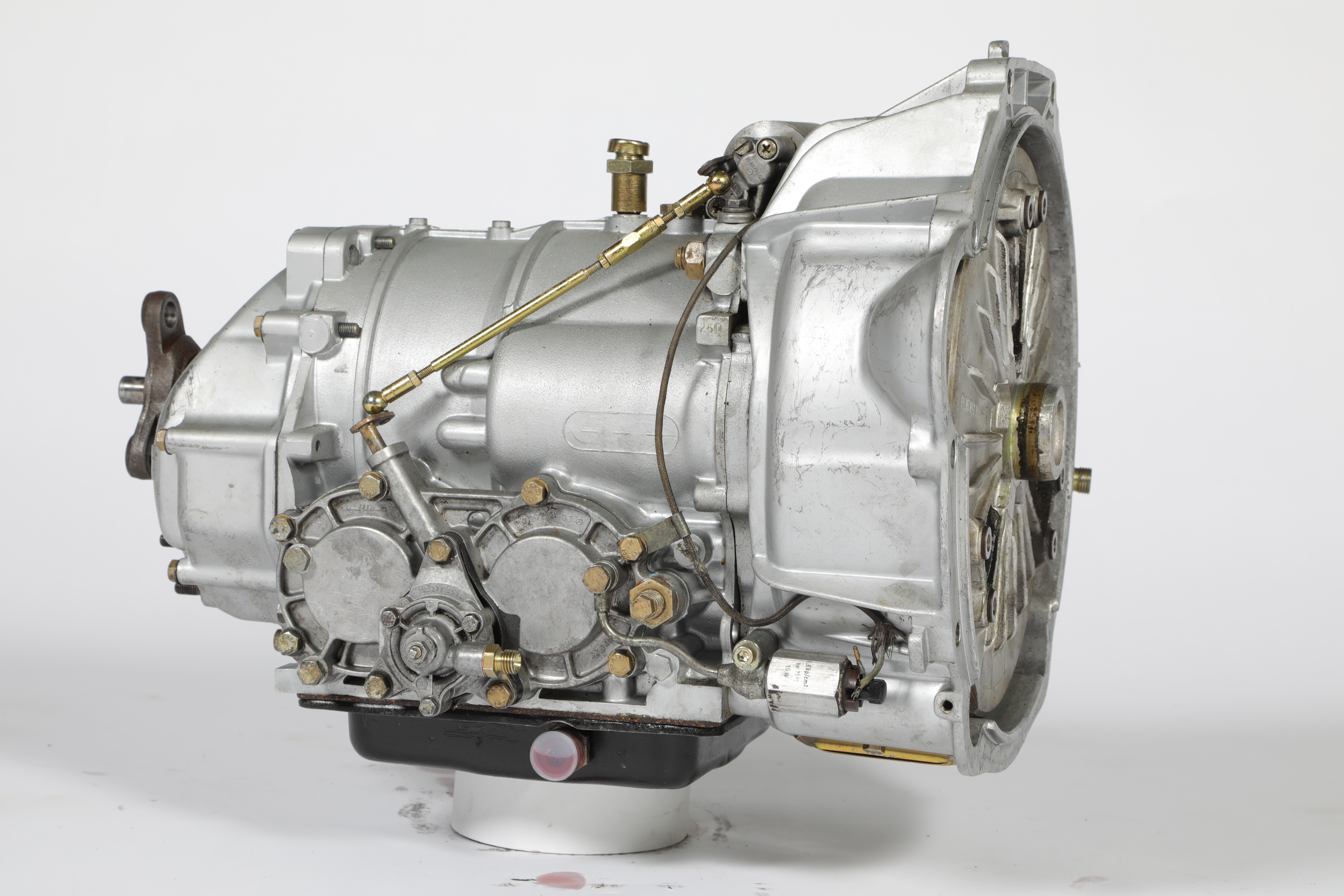
K4A 025 transmission right hand side view

=== Specifications ===
The K4A 025 is the first design, launched in April 1961 for the W 111 220 SEb, later replaced with the more reliable second design K4C 025 (type 722.2). It is a 4-speed unit and uses fluid coupling (also referred in some manuals as hydraulic/automatic clutch).

This first design did not work out. It results in poor shifting comfort, which does not meet Mercedes-Benz standards. This applies in particular to the change from 2nd to 3rd gear (and vice versa), which requires a group change—that is, all four of the relevant shift levers must be released or actuated.

=== Planetary gearset concept first design ===
For this 1st automatic transmission generation (Note: plus 1 reverse gear) 8 main components (Note: 2 simple planetary gearsets, 3 brakes, 3 clutches) are used. It is the only exemption which uses only 2 planetary gearsets for 4 speeds.

== 2nd generation 1964: K4B 050 and follow-up products — second 4-speed design with 3 planetary gearsets — ==
=== Specifications ===
The Mercedes-Benz 600, which was unveiled in September 1963 at the International Motor Show in Frankfurt, went into production in September 1964 and was the first post-war "Grand Mercedes", powered by the Mercedes-Benz M100 engine. This made a gearbox for the highest demands of luxury vehicles necessary.

The 1st automatic transmission generation was out of the question from the start. The introduction of the 600 was therefore taken as an opportunity to develop a completely new design for the automatic transmission, at Mercedes-Benz later referred to as 2nd automatic transmission generation.

Mercedes-Benz licensed a variant – featuring cross-coupled ring gears and carriers instead of coupled sun gears – of the Simpson planetary gearset in order to replace the original epicyclic gearset of the first design and thereby eliminate the need for group changes.

=== Models ===
==== 1964: K4B 050 ====
The first model with the new design was the K4B 050. Beside the new layout the number of pinions is doubled from 3 to 6 to handle the much higher torque of the big block V8 engine M 100.

==== 1967: K4C 025 ====
After the satisfactory experience with the new design, it was adopted with slightly different gear ratios in 1967 for the new core model K4C 025 (Type 722.2) of the 2nd automatic transmission generation from Mercedes-Benz.

==== 1969: K4A 040 ====
With the introduction of the small block V8 engine M 116, the K4A 040 (Type 722.2) was launched, which is a reinforced version of the K4C 025 with the same gear ratios to accommodate the increased torque.

==== 1972: W4B 025 ====
When the torque converter technique was fully established, the fluid coupling was replaced by a torque converter for the smaller engines, which leads to the W4B 025 (type 722.1). Used in L4, L5 and L6 engines due to its lower torque output. In normal situations, it rests stationary in 2nd gear, but it will use 1st gear when the vehicle starts moving and throttle is applied or if L position is selected in gear selector.

==== Variants for commercial vehicles ====
The W4A 018 (type 720.1) was derived from the W4B 025 (type 722.1) for light-duty trucks and vans up to 5,600 kg (12,350 lb) and off-road vehicles. The W4B 035 is based on the same design and designated for medium-duty trucks up to 13,000 kg (28,660 lb). The main difference is the use of straight-cut planetary gearsets instead of helical-cut ones for better fuel efficiency at the price of lower noise comfort.

=== Planetary gearset concept second design ===
For this 2nd generation 4-speed variants (Note: plus 1 reverse gear) 8 main components (Note: 3 simple planetary gearsets, 3 brakes, 2 clutches) are used.

== 2nd generation 1971: W3A 040 and follow-up products — 3-speed variant of the second design with 2 planetary gearsets — ==
=== Specifications ===
When the torque converter technique was fully established, 3-speed variants, the W3A 040 and W3B 050 (type 722.0) are combined with V8 engines, using torque converters instead of fluid couplings. The transmission design saves 1 planetary gearset, so the Simpson planetary gearset is no longer necessary. Therefore this variant is not based on a Simpson gearset design, but on the Detroit Gear. Since the same housing as in the 4-speed versions is used, the free space therefore is used to reinforce the shift elements (brakes and clutches) to handle the higher torque of the V8 engines.

First the W3A 040 was released for the all new M117 V8 engine of the W 108 and W 109 in 1971.

The second variant in the series is the W3B 050, which was released initially for the W 116 450 SE/SEL in 1973. At that time the 4-speed transmission for the 350 SE/SEL was replaced by this 3-speed variant.

The reinforced W3B 050 reinforced (type 722.003) is the strongest variant of the series, able to handle the input of the enlarged version of the M 100, the biggest Mercedes-Benz engine in post-war history, exclusively used in the W 116 450 SEL 6.9.

The W3B 050 was available as an optional extra for the Porsche 928 from 1977 to 1984.

=== Planetary gearset concept second design, 3-speed variant ===
For the 3-speed variants (Note: plus 1 reverse gear) 7 main components (Note: 2 simple planetary gearsets, 3 brakes, 2 clutches) are used, which shows economic equivalence with the direct competitor.

== Applications ==
Variants and applications
Model	Car Model (Note: without any claim of completeness)				
Model	Chassis code	Car model	Engine code	Transmission code	Notes
K4A 025 (Note: K4A 025 & K4B 050: without type designation) (1st generation (Note: 1st generation: at Mercedes-Benz later referred to as 1st automatic transmission generation))
E-Class	1961–1968 W 110				
S-Class	1961–1965 (saloon) W 111; 1961–1968 (coupé/convertible) W 111; 1961–1965 (saloon) W 112; 1962–1968 (coupé/convertible) W 112; 1965–1968 W 108; 1965–1968 W 109				
SL-Class	1963–1971 W 113				
K4B 050 (2nd generation (Note: 2nd generation: at Mercedes-Benz later referred to as 2nd automatic transmission generation))
S-Class	1964–1981 600 (W 100); 1968–1972 300 SEL 6.3 (W 109)				
K4C 025 (Type 722.2, 2nd generation)
E-Class	114.015	230.6	180.954	722.203	
E-Class	114.017	230.6 Lang	180.954	722.203	
E-Class	114.011	250	130.923	722.204	
E-Class	114.023	250 C	130.923	722.204	
E-Class	114.060	280	110.921	722.202	
E-Class	114.073	280 C	110.921	722.202	
E-Class	114.062	280 E	110.981	722.200	
E-Class	114.072	280 CE	110.981	722.200	
E-Class	115.015	200	115.923	722.205	
E-Class	115.010	220	115.920	722.205	
E-Class	115.115	200 D	615.913	722.206	
E-Class	115.110	220 D	615.912	722.206	
E-Class	115.112	220 D Lang	615.912	722.206	
S-Class	1968–1971 (coupé/convertible) W 111; 1968–1972 W 108; 1968–1972 W 109				
K4A 040 (Type 722.2, 2nd generation)
S-Class	109.056	300 SEL 3.5	116.981 (D-Jet)	722.201	worldwide except USA
S-Class	108.057	280 SE 3.5	116.980 (D-Jet)	722.201	worldwide except USA
S-Class	108.058	280 SEL 3.5	116.980 (D-Jet)	722.201	worldwide except USA
SL-Class	107.043	350 SL	116.982 (D-Jet); 116.984 (K-Jet)	722.201	
SL-Class	107.023	350 SLC	116.982 (D-Jet); 116.984 (K-Jet)	722.201	
W3A 040 (Type 722.0, 2nd generation)
S-Class	109.057	300 SEL 4.5	117.981 (D-Jet)	722.000	USA only
S-Class	108.067	280 SE 4.5	117.984 (D-Jet)	722.000	USA only
S-Class	108.068	280 SEL 4.5	117.984 (D-Jet)	722.000	USA only
S-Class	116.028	350 SE	116.983 (D-Jet); 116.985 (K-Jet)	722.002	
S-Class	116.029	350 SEL	116.983 (D-Jet); 116.985 (K-Jet)	722.002	
S-Class	116.032	450 SE	117.983 (D-Jet); 117.986 (K-Jet)	722.004	USA and Japan only
S-Class	116.033	450 SEL	117.983 (D-Jet); 117.986 (K-Jet)	722.004	USA and Japan only
SL-Class	107.043	350 SL	116.982 (D-Jet); 116.984 (K-Jet)	722.002	
SL-Class	107.023	350 SLC	116.982 (D-Jet); 116.984 (K-Jet)	722.002	
SL-Class	107.044	450 SL	117.982 (D-Jet); 117.985 (K-Jet)	722.004	USA and Japan only
SL-Class	107.024	450 SLC	117.982 (D-Jet); 117.985 (K-Jet)	722.004	USA and Japan only
W3B 050 (Note: W3B 050 for 450 SEL 6.9 W3B 050 reinf. (reinforced)) (Type 722.0, 2nd generation)
S-Class	116.032	450 SE	117.983 (D-Jet); 117.986 (K-Jet)	722.001	worldwide except USA and Japan
S-Class	116.033	450 SEL	117.983 (D-Jet); 117.986 (K-Jet)	722.001	worldwide except USA and Japan
S-Class	116.036	450 SEL 6.9	100.985 (K-Jet)	722.003; W3B 050	
SL-Class	107.044	450 SL	117.982 (D-Jet); 117.985 (K-Jet)	722.001	worldwide except USA and Japan
SL-Class	107.024	450 SLC	117.982 (D-Jet); 117.985 (K-Jet)	722.001	worldwide except USA and Japan
SL-Class	107.026	450 SLC 5.0 (Note: 450 SLC 5.0: as of 03/1980: 500 SLC)	117.960 (K-Jet)	722.001	worldwide except USA and Japan
Porsche	1977 – 1984 928				
W4B 025 (Type 722.1, 2nd generation)
E-Class	114.615	230.6	180.954	722.105	
E-Class	114.617	230.6 Lang	180.954	722.105	
E-Class	114.611	250	130.923	722.104	
E-Class	114.623	250 C	130.923	722.104	
E-Class	114.660	280	110.921	722.102	
E-Class	114.673	280 C	110.921	722.102	
E-Class	114.662	280 E	110.981	722.103	
E-Class	114.672	280 CE	110.981	722.103	
E-Class	115.615	200	115.923	722.106	
E-Class	115.017	230.4	115.951	722.110	
E-Class	115.715	200 D	615.913	722.107	
E-Class	115.710	220 D	615.912	722.107	
E-Class	115.117	240 D	616.916	722.108	
E-Class	115.119	240 D Lang	616.916	722.108	
E-Class	115.114	240 D 3.0	617.910	722.109	
E-Class	123.020	200	115.938; 115.939	722.115	
E-Class	123.220	200	102.920; 102.939	722.121	
E-Class	123.280	200 T	102.920; 102.939	722.121	
E-Class	123.023	230	115.954	722.119	
E-Class	123.083	230 T	115.954	722.119	
E-Class	123.043	230 C	115.954	722.119	
E-Class	123.223	230 E	102.980	722.122	
E-Class	123.283	230 TE	102.980	722.122	
E-Class	123.243	230 CE	102.980	722.122	
E-Class	123.026	250	123.920; 123.921	722.113	
E-Class	123.086	250 T	123.920; 123.921	722.113	
E-Class	123.028	250 Lang	123.920; 123.921	722.113	
E-Class	123.030	280	110.923	722.111	
E-Class	123.050	280 C	110.923	722.111	
E-Class	123.033	280 E	110.984; 110.988	722.112	
E-Class	123.093	280 TE	110.984; 110.988	722.112	
E-Class	123.053	280 CE	110.984; 110.988	722.112	
E-Class	123.120	200 D	615.940	722.116	
E-Class	123.126	220 D	615.941	722.116	
E-Class	123.123	240 D	616.912	722.117	
E-Class	123.183	240 TD	616.912	722.117	
E-Class	123.125	240 D Lang	616.912	722.117	
E-Class	123.130	300 D	617.912	722.118	
E-Class	123.190	300 TD	617.912	722.118	
E-Class	123.132	300 D Lang	617.912	722.118	
E-Class	123.150	300 CD	617.912	722.118	USA only
S-Class	116.020	280 S	110.922	722.100; 722.102; 722.111	
S-Class	116.024	280 SE	110.983 (D-Jet); 110.985 (K-Jet)	722.101; 722.103; 722.112	
S-Class	116.025	280 SEL	110.983 (D-Jet); 110.985 (K-Jet)	722.101; 722.103; 722.112	
S-Class	116.120	300 SD	617.950	722.120	USA only
SL-Class	107.042	280 SL	110.982 (D-Jet); 110.986 (K-Jet)	722.103; 722.112	
SL-Class	107.022	280 SLC	110.982 (D-Jet); 110.986 (K-Jet)	722.103; 722.112	

== See also ==
- List of Mercedes-Benz transmissions
