= List of Mercedes-Benz transmissions =

Motor vehicle automatic and manual transmissions

Mercedes-Benz is a German automotive brand that was formed with the merger of Benz & Cie., the world's oldest car company, and Daimler Motoren Gesellschaft in 1926. It is part of the Mercedes-Benz Group AG, a German car manufacturing company. It manufactures its own automobile transmissions and only purchases from suppliers in individual cases. They may be used in passenger cars and SUVs, or light commercial vehicles such as vans and light trucks.

Basically there are two types of motor vehicle transmissions:

- Manual – the driver has to perform each gear change using a manually operated clutch
- Automatic – once placed in drive (or any other 'automatic' selector position), it automatically selects the gear ratio dependent on engine speed and load

Basically there are two types of engine installation:

- In the longitudinal direction, the gearbox is usually designed separately from the final drive (including the differential). The transaxle configuration combines the gearbox and final drive in one housing and is only built in individual cases
- In the transverse direction, the gearbox and final drive are very often combined in one housing due to the much more restricted space available

Every type of transmission occurs in every type of installation.

== Mercedes-Benz manual transmissions ==
For manual transmissions G for gearbox (German: Getriebe) and two digits are used. See G56 — 6-speed manual as an example. In 2019, Mercedes-Benz discontinued the production of manual transmissions.

== Mercedes-Benz automatic transmissions ==
Production of automatic transmissions began in 1961. 720 to currently 725 are the designations (types) to identify automatic, dual-clutch (DCT), Continuously variable (CVT), and automated manual transmissions (AMT).

3‑ to 9‑speed
Trade- mark Name	Model	Type	Version	Pro- duction Period	Engine Orien- tation	Gear Ratios (Note: Differences in gear ratios have a measurable, direct impact on vehicle dynamics, performance, waste emissions as well as fuel mileage Nomenclature With $n =$ gear is: $i_n =$ gear ratio or transmission ratio; $\omega_{1;n} = \omega_t =$ shaft speed shaft 1: input (turbine) shaft; $\omega_{2;n} =$ shaft speed shaft 2: output shaft)			Span	Layout		Cou- pling	Control	Mount
Trade- mark Name	Model	Type	Version	Pro- duction Period	Engine Orien- tation	$i_1$ $i_R$	$i_n$ Avg. Step (Note: Average gear step: $\left( \frac{\omega_{2;n}} {\omega_{2;1}} \right) ^\frac{1} {n-1} = \left( \frac{i_1} {i_n} \right) ^\frac{1} {n-1}$; There are $n-1$ gear steps between $n$ gears; with decreasing step width; the gears connect better to each other; shifting comfort increases)	Count (Note: plus 1 reverse gear (unless otherwise specified)) Gear- sets (Note: Epicyclic gearing (unless otherwise specified))	Nomi- nal (Note: Total ratio span (total gear ratio/total transmission ratio) nominal: $\frac{\omega_{2;n}} {\omega_{2;1}} = \frac{\frac{\omega_{2;n}} {\omega_{2;1} \omega_{2;n}}} {\frac{\omega_{2;1}} {\omega_{2;1} \omega_{2;n}}} = \frac{\frac{1} {\omega_{2;1}}} {\frac{1} {\omega_{2;n}}} = \frac{\frac{\omega_t} {\omega_{2;1}}} {\frac{\omega_t} {\omega_{2;n}}} = \frac{i_1} {i_n}$; A wider span enables the; downspeeding when driving outside the city limits; increase the climbing ability; when driving over mountain passes or off-road; or when towing a trailer) Effec- tive (Note: Total ratio span (total gear ratio/total transmission ratio) effective: $\frac{\omega_{2;n}} {max(\omega_{2;1};|\omega_{2;R}|)} = \frac{min(i_1;|i_R|)} {i_n}$; The span is only effective to the extent that; the reverse gear ratio; matches that of 1st gear; Digression Reverse gear: is usually longer than 1st gear; the effective span is therefore of central importance for describing the suitability of a transmission; because in these cases, the nominal spread conveys a misleading picture; which is only unproblematic for vehicles with high specific power; Market participants: Manufacturers naturally have no interest in specifying the effective span; Users have not yet formulated the practical benefits that the effective span has for them; The effective span has not yet played a role in research and teaching; Contrary to its significance: the effective span has therefore not yet been able to establish itself; either in theory; or in practice.; End of digression)	Power Flow (Note: Progress increases cost-effectiveness and is reflected in the ratio of forward gears to main components. It depends on the power flow: parallel: using the two degrees of freedom of planetary gearsets; to increase the number of gears; with unchanged number of components; serial: in-line combined planetary gearsets without using the two degrees of freedom; to increase the number of gears; a corresponding increase in the number of components is unavoidable) Cost Ratio	Brakes Clutches	Cou- pling	Control	Mount
N/A	K4A; 025	N/A; 1st (Note: 1st: at Mercedes-Benz later referred to as 1st automatic transmission generation)	25 kg⋅m (245 N⋅m; 181 lb⋅ft)	1961 – 1971	Longitudinal	3.9789 −4.1455	1.0000; 1.5846	4; 2	3.9789; 3.9789	S 2.0000	3; 3	Fluid; Coupling	Hydraulic	4-Bolt
N/A	K4B; 050 (Note: K4B 050: for the 6.3 L V8-engine M 100 of the 600 and 300 SEL 6.3)	N/A; 2nd (Note: 2nd: at Mercedes-Benz later referred to as 2nd automatic transmission generation)	51 kg⋅m (500 N⋅m; 369 lb⋅ft)	1964 – 1981	Longitudinal	3.9789 −4.1455	1.0000; 1.5846	4; 3	3.9789; 3.9789	S 2.0000	3; 2	Fluid; Coupling	Hydraulic	4-Bolt
N/A	K4C; 025	722.2; 2nd	25 kg⋅m (245 N⋅m; 181 lb⋅ft)	1967 – 1972	Longitudinal	3.9833 −5.4779	1.0000; 1.5852	4; 3	3.9833; 3.9833	S 2.0000	3; 2	Fluid; Coupling	Hydraulic	4-Bolt
N/A	K4A; 040	722.2; 2nd	40 kg⋅m (392 N⋅m; 289 lb⋅ft)	1969 – 1971	Longitudinal	3.9833 −5.4779	1.0000; 1.5852	4; 3	3.9833; 3.9833	S 2.0000	3; 2	Fluid; Coupling	Hydraulic	4-Bolt
N/A	W3A; 040 (Note: p. 452)	722.0; 2nd	40 kg⋅m (392 N⋅m; 289 lb⋅ft)	1971 – 1980	Longitudinal	2.3061 −1.8361	1.0000; 1.5186	3; 2	2.3061; 1.8361	S 2.3333	3; 2	Torque; Converter	Hydraulic	4-Bolt
N/A	W3A; 050	722.0; 2nd	50 kg⋅m (490 N⋅m; 362 lb⋅ft)	1973 – 1980	Longitudinal	2.3061 −1.8361	1.0000; 1.5186	3; 2	2.3061; 1.8361	S 2.3333	3; 2	Torque; Converter	Hydraulic	4-Bolt
N/A	W3A; 050 reinf. (Note: W3A 050 reinforced (German: verstärkt): for the 6.8 L V8-engine M 100 of the 450 SEL 6.9)	722.0; 2nd	56 kg⋅m (549 N⋅m; 405 lb⋅ft)	1975 – 1981	Longitudinal	2.3061 −1.8361	1.0000; 1.5186	3; 2	2.3061; 1.8361	S 2.3333	3; 2	Torque; Converter	Hydraulic	4-Bolt
N/A	W4B; 025	722.1; 2nd	25 kg⋅m (245 N⋅m; 181 lb⋅ft)	1972 – 1983	Longitudinal	3.9833 −5.4779	1.0000; 1.5852	4; 3	3.9833; 3.9833	S 2.0000	3; 2	Torque; Converter	Hydraulic	4-Bolt
N/A	W4A; 018 (Note: W4A 018: for light duty trucks and vans up to 5,600 kg (12,350 lb) and off-road vehicles (Note: p. 487))	720.1; 2nd	18 kg⋅m (177 N⋅m; 130 lb⋅ft)	1975 – 1990	Longitudinal	4.0060 −5.4994	1.0000; 1.5882	4; 3	4.0060; 4.0060	S 2.0000	3; 2	Torque; Converter	Hydraulic	4-Bolt
N/A	W4B; 035 (Note: W4B 035: for medium duty trucks up to 13,000 kg (28,660 lb) (Note: p. 489))	TBD	35 kg⋅m (343 N⋅m; 253 lb⋅ft)	1975 –	Longitudinal	4.1758 −5.8810	1.0000; 1.6103	4; 3	4.1758; 4.1758	S 2.0000	3; 2	Torque; Converter	Hydraulic	
4G-Tronic (Note: 4G-Tronic and 5G-Tronic: unofficial names given to the transmissions by car enthusiasts)	W4A; 040 (Note: pp. 171 & 192)	722.3; 3rd (Note: 3rd: at Mercedes-Benz later referred to as 3rd automatic transmission generation)	40 kg⋅m (392 N⋅m; 289 lb⋅ft)	1979 – 1988	Longitudinal (Note: with all-wheel drive 4Matic on request)	3.6759 −5.1388	1.0000; 1.5433	4; 3	3.6759; 3.6759	S 2.0000	3; 2	Torque; Converter	Hydraulic	6-Bolt
4G-Tronic	W4A; 020	722.4; 3rd	20 kg⋅m (196 N⋅m; 145 lb⋅ft)	1982 – 1996	Longitudinal	4.2491 −5.6692	1.0000; 1.6197	4; 3	4.2491; 4.2491	S 2.0000	3; 2	Torque; Converter	Hydraulic	6-Bolt
4G-Tronic	W4A; 040 II	722.3; 3rd	40 kg⋅m (392 N⋅m; 289 lb⋅ft)	1985 – 1996	Longitudinal	3.8707 −5.5857	1.0000; 1.5701	4; 3	3.8707; 3.8707	S 2.0000	3; 2	Torque; Converter	Hydraulic	6-Bolt
4G-Tronic	W4A; 028 (Note: W4A 028: for off-road vehicles)	722.3; 3rd	28 kg⋅m (275 N⋅m; 203 lb⋅ft)	1990 – 1996	Longitudinal	3.8707 −5.5857	1.0000; 1.5701	4; 3	3.8707; 3.8707	S 2.0000	3; 2	Torque; Converter	Hydraulic	6-Bolt
4G-Tronic	W5A; 030	722.5; 3rd	30 kg⋅m (294 N⋅m; 217 lb⋅ft)	1990 – 1996	Longitudinal	3.8707 −5.5857	0.7500; 1.5072	5; 4	5.1609; 5.1609	S 2.2000	4; 3	Torque; Converter	H + E (Note: Control: Reverse gear and gears 1 – 4: Hydraulic; Gear 5 (Overdrive): Electronic)	6-Bolt
5G-Tronic	W5A; 280 (Note: W5A 280: for vans: Vito · Sprinter · Vario)	722.6; NAG 1 (Note: NAG 1: First New Automatic Gearbox Generation (German: Neue Atomatikgetriebe-Generation 1) introducing the all new combined parallel and serial power flow)	280 N⋅m (207 lb⋅ft)	TBD	Longitudinal	3.9319 −3.1002	0.8305; 1.4751	5 (Note: plus 2 reverse gears); 3	4.7345; 3.7331	P & S 1.8000	3; 3	Torque; Converter w/ Lockup	Electronic	
5G-Tronic	W5A; 300 (Note: W5A 300: for SUV with 6 cylinder engines)	722.6; NAG 1	300 N⋅m (221 lb⋅ft)	TBD	Longitudinal	3.9319 −3.1002	0.8305; 1.4751	5; 3	4.7345; 3.7331	P & S 1.8000	3; 3	Torque; Converter w/ Lockup	Electronic	
5G-Tronic	W5A; 330 (Note: W5A 330: for passenger cars with 4, 5 and 6 cylinder engines)	722.6; NAG 1	330 N⋅m (243 lb⋅ft)	1996 – 2016	Longitudinal	3.9319 −3.1002	0.8305; 1.4751	5; 3	4.7345; 3.7331	P & S 1.8000	3; 3	Torque; Converter w/ Lockup	Electronic	
5G-Tronic	W5A; 400 (Note: W5A 400: for SUV with 8 cylinder engines)	722.6; NAG 1	400 N⋅m (295 lb⋅ft)	TBD	Longitudinal	3.5876 −3.1605	0.8314; 1.4413	5; 3	4.3152; 3.8015	P & S 1.8000	3; 3	Torque; Converter w/ Lockup	Electronic	
5G-Tronic	W5A; 580 (Note: W5A 580: for passenger cars with 8 and 12 cylinder engines and later for the 6 cylinder turbocharged diesel direct injection engines)	722.6; NAG 1	580 N⋅m (428 lb⋅ft)	1996 – 2014	Longitudinal	3.5876 −3.1605	0.8314; 1.4413	5; 3	4.3152; 3.8015	P & S 1.8000	3; 3	Torque; Converter w/ Lockup	Electronic	
5G-Tronic	W5A; 900 (Note: W5A 900: for cars with 8 and 12 cylinder turbocharged engines)	722.6; NAG 1	900 N⋅m (664 lb⋅ft)	1996 – 2014	Longitudinal	3.5876 −3.1605	0.8314; 1.4413	5; 3	4.3152; 3.8015	P & S 1.8000	3; 3	Torque; Converter w/ Lockup	Electronic	
5G-Tronic	W5A; 330 (Note: W5A 330: for cars from Chrysler with 6 cylinder engines)	722.6; NAG 1	330 N⋅m (243 lb⋅ft)	2004 – 2018	Longitudinal	3.9510 −3.1473	0.8331; 1.4757	5	4.7425; 3.7777	P & S 1.8000	3; 3	Torque; Converter w/ Lockup	Electronic	
5G-Tronic	W5A; 580 (Note: W5A 580: for cars from Chrysler with 8 cylinder engines)	722.6; NAG 1	580 N⋅m (428 lb⋅ft)	2004 – 2018	Longitudinal	3.5951 −3.1671	0.8309; 1.4422	5; 3	4.3266; 3.8115	P & S 1.8000	3; 3	Torque; Converter w/ Lockup	Electronic	
5G-Tronic; AMT	W5A; 180	722.7	180 N⋅m (133 lb⋅ft)	1997 – 2020	Transverse	3.625 −3.670	0.721; 1.497	5; 5 (Note: helical gear)	5.028; 5.028	S —	0; 6	Torque; Converter w/ Lockup	Electronic	
7G-Tronic	W7A; 400	722.9; NAG 2 (Note: NAG 2: Second New Automatic Gearbox Generation (German: Neue Atomatikgetriebe-Generation 2) with parallel and serial power flow)	400 N⋅m (295 lb⋅ft)	2003 – 2020	Longitudinal	4.3772 −3.4157	0.7276; 1.3486	7; 4	6.0162; 4.6948	P & S 1.5714	4; 3	Torque; Converter w/ Lockup	Electronic	
7G-Tronic	W7A; 700	722.9; NAG 2	700 N⋅m (516 lb⋅ft)	2003 – 2020	Longitudinal	4.3772 −3.4157	0.7276; 1.3486	7; 4	6.0162; 4.6948	P & S 1.5714	4; 3	Torque; Converter w/ Lockup	Electronic	
7G-Tronic	W7A; 900	722.9; NAG 2	1,000 N⋅m (738 lb⋅ft)	2003 – 2020	Longitudinal	4.3772 −3.4157	0.7276; 1.3486	7; 4	6.0162; 4.6948	P & S 1.5714	4; 3	Torque; Converter w/ Lockup	Electronic	
Auto- tronic (Note: CVT Mercedes-Benz 722.8 (https://gearboxlist.com/mercedes/722-8/ · Retrieved 2024-11-16))	Temic; VGS	722.8	300 N⋅m (221 lb⋅ft)	2004 – 2012	Transverse	2.720 −2.720	0.420; 1.000 (CVT)	∞ (CVT)	6.476; 6.476	S —	— —	Torque; Converter w/ Lockup	Electronic	
AMG; SpeedShift; DCT	TBD	700.4 (Note: this robotic gearbox is only a modification of the Italian Getrag 7DCL 750 gearbox (Note: Mercedes-Benz AMG-SpeedShift (700.4) · (https://gearboxlist.com/mercedes/amg-speedshift-dct-700-4/ · Retrieved 2024-11-18)))	800 N⋅m (590 lb⋅ft)	2009 –	Longitudinal; Transaxle	3.397 −2.790	0.720; 1.295	7; 7	4.718; 3.875	S —	0; 7	Dual- Clutch	Electronic	
7G-DCT (Note: Mercedes-Benz 7G-DCT (724.0) (https://gearboxlist.com/mercedes/7g-dct-724-0/ · Retrieved 2024-11-18))	TBD	724.0	350 N⋅m (258 lb⋅ft)	2011 –	Transverse	3.857 −3.375	0.480; 1.415	7; 7	8.035; 7.031	S —	0; 7	Dual- Clutch	Electronic	
9G-Tronic	W9A; 400	725.0; NAG 3 (Note: NAG 3: Third New Automatic Gearbox Generation (German: Neue Atomatikgetriebe-Generation 3) with parallel and serial power flow)	400 N⋅m (295 lb⋅ft)	2013 – 2016	Longitudinal	5.5032 −4.9316	0.6015; 1.3188	9; 4	9.1495; 8.1991	P & S 1.1111	3; 3	Torque; Converter w/ Lockup	Electronic	
9G-Tronic	W9A; 500	725.0; NAG 3	500 N⋅m (369 lb⋅ft)	2013 – 2016	Longitudinal	5.5032 −4.9316	0.6015; 1.3188	9; 4	9.1495; 8.1991	P & S 1.1111	3; 3	Torque; Converter w/ Lockup	Electronic	
9G-Tronic	W9A; 700	725.0; NAG 3	700 N⋅m (516 lb⋅ft)	2013 – 2016	Longitudinal	5.5032 −4.9316	0.6015; 1.3188	9; 4	9.1495; 8.1991	P & S 1.1111	3; 3	Torque; Converter w/ Lockup	Electronic	
9G-Tronic	W9A; 900	725.0; NAG 3	1,000 N⋅m (738 lb⋅ft)	2013 – 2016	Longitudinal	5.5032 −4.9316	0.6015; 1.3188	9; 4	9.1495; 8.1991	P & S 1.1111	3; 3	Torque; Converter w/ Lockup	Electronic	
9G-Tronic	W9A; 400	725.0; NAG 3	400 N⋅m (295 lb⋅ft)	2016 – Present	Longitudinal	5.3545 −4.7983	0.6015; 1.3143	9; 4	8.9022; 7.9775	P & S 1.1111	3; 3	Torque; Converter w/ Lockup	Electronic	
9G-Tronic	W9A; 500	725.0; NAG 3	500 N⋅m (369 lb⋅ft)	2016 – Present	Longitudinal	5.3545 −4.7983	0.6015; 1.3143	9; 4	8.9022; 7.9775	P & S 1.1111	3; 3	Torque; Converter w/ Lockup	Electronic	
9G-Tronic	W9A; 700	725.0; NAG 3	700 N⋅m (516 lb⋅ft)	2016 – Present	Longitudinal	5.3545 −4.7983	0.6015; 1.3143	9; 4	8.9022; 7.9775	P & S 1.1111	3; 3	Torque; Converter w/ Lockup	Electronic	
9G-Tronic	W9A; 900	725.0; NAG 3	1,000 N⋅m (738 lb⋅ft)	2016 – Present	Longitudinal	5.3545 −4.7983	0.6015; 1.3143	9; 4	8.9022; 7.9775	P & S 1.1111	3; 3	Torque; Converter w/ Lockup	Electronic	
8G-DCT (Note: Mercedes-Benz 8G-DCT (724.1) (https://gearboxlist.com/mercedes/8g-dct-724-1/ · Retrieved 2024-11-18))	TBD	724.1	520 N⋅m (384 lb⋅ft)	2019 –	Transverse	4.257 −3.575	0.480; 1.366	8; 8	8.869; 7.448	S —	0; 8	Dual- Clutch	Electronic	
Automatic transmissions with components for hybrid drive integrated
9G-Tronic	W9A; 400	725.1; NAG 3	400 N⋅m (295 lb⋅ft)	2020 – Present	Longitudinal	5.3545 −4.7983	0.6015; 1.3143	9; 4	8.9022; 7.9775	P & S 1.1111	3; 3	Torque; Converter w/ Lockup	Electronic	
9G-Tronic	W9A; 500	725.1; NAG 3	500 N⋅m (369 lb⋅ft)	2020 – Present	Longitudinal	5.3545 −4.7983	0.6015; 1.3143	9; 4	8.9022; 7.9775	P & S 1.1111	3; 3	Torque; Converter w/ Lockup	Electronic	
9G-Tronic	W9A; 700	725.1; NAG 3	700 N⋅m (516 lb⋅ft)	2020 – Present	Longitudinal	5.3545 −4.7983	0.6015; 1.3143	9; 4	8.9022; 7.9775	P & S 1.1111	3; 3	Torque; Converter w/ Lockup	Electronic	
9G-Tronic	W9A; 900	725.1; NAG 3	1,000 N⋅m (738 lb⋅ft)	2020 – Present	Longitudinal	5.3545 −4.7983	0.6015; 1.3143	9; 4	8.9022; 7.9775	P & S 1.1111	3; 3	Torque; Converter w/ Lockup	Electronic	
