= Mercedes-Benz 9G-Tronic transmission =

World's first longitudinal 9-speed automatic from 2013

9G-Tronic
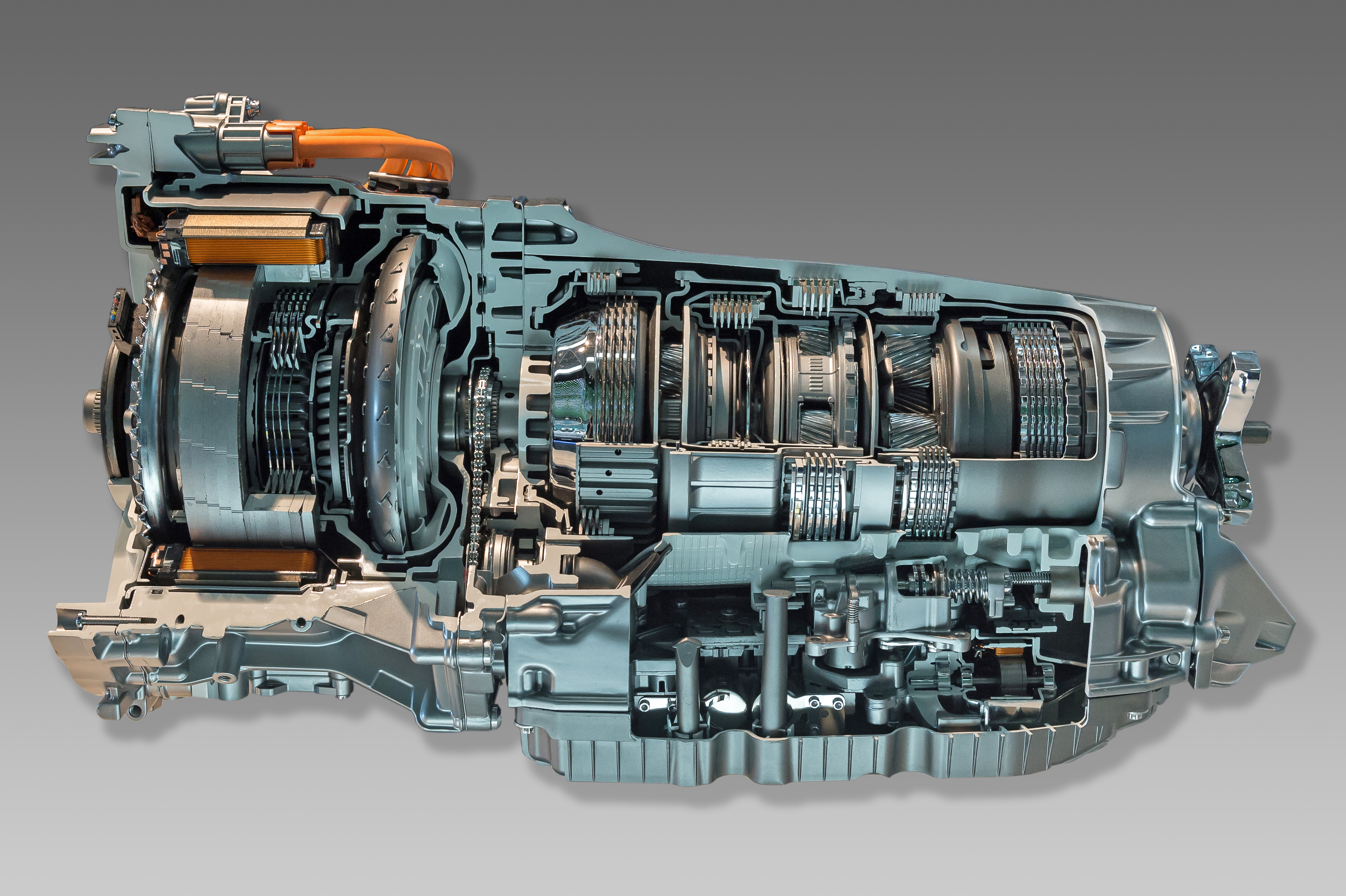
- Cutaway model of the transmission with components for hybrid drive

Overview
- Manufacturer: Daimler AG; Jatco Ltd
- Model code: W9A 400/700/1000 · Type 725.0; 9AT · JR913E (Jatco)
- Production: 2013–present

Body and chassis
- Class: 9-speed longitudinal automatic transmission
- Related: ZF 8HP · Aisin-Toyota 8-speed · Ford-GM 10-speed

Chronology
- Predecessor: 7G-Tronic

9G-Tronic is Mercedes-Benz's trademark name for its 9-speed automatic transmission for longitudinal engines. The transmission is suitable for rear-wheel drive, all-wheel drive, hybrid, and plug-in hybrid drives and has been gradually introduced in most model series, starting off with the W9A 700 converter-9-gear-automatic with 700 N⋅m (516 lb⋅ft) maximum input torque (German: Wandler-9-Gang-Automatik bis 700 N⋅m Eingangsdrehmoment • type 725.0) as core model.

The Jatco 9AT transmission is based on the same globally patented gearset concept.

== Key data ==
Gear ratios (Note: Differences in gear ratios have a measurable, direct impact on vehicle dynamics, performance, waste emissions as well as fuel mileage)
Model	Type	First Deliv- ery	Gear										Total Span			Avg. Step	Components		Nomenclature			
Model	Type	First Deliv- ery	R	1	2	3	4	5	6	7	8	9	Nomi- nal	Effec- tive	Cen- ter	Avg. Step	Total	per Gear (Note: Forward gears only)	Cou- pling	Gears Count	Ver- sion	Maximum Input Torque
W9A 400 W9A 500 W9A 700 W9A 900	725.0; NAG 3 (Note: 3rd generation of advanced automatic transmissions with a combined parallel and serially coupled gearset concept for more gears and improved economy, at Mercedes-Benz referred to as NAG 3 (New Automatic Gearbox Generation 3 · German: Neue Automatikgetriebe-Generation 3))	2013	−4.932	5.503	3.333	2.315	1.661	1.211	1.000	0.865	0.717	0.601	9.150	8.199	1.819	1.319	4 Gearsets; 3 Brakes; 3 Clutches	1.111	W (Note: Torque converter · German: Wandler or Drehmomentwandler)	9	A	400 N⋅m (295 lb⋅ft); 500 N⋅m (369 lb⋅ft); 700 N⋅m (516 lb⋅ft); 1,000 N⋅m (738 lb⋅ft)
W9A 400 W9A 500 W9A 700 W9A 900	725.0; NAG 3	2016	−4.798	5.354	3.243	2.252	1.636	1.211	1.000	0.865	0.717	0.601	8.902	7.977	1.795	1.314	4 Gearsets; 3 Brakes; 3 Clutches	1.111	W	9	A	400 N⋅m (295 lb⋅ft); 500 N⋅m (369 lb⋅ft); 700 N⋅m (516 lb⋅ft); 1,000 N⋅m (738 lb⋅ft)
W9A 400 W9A 500 W9A 700 W9A 900	725.1 (Note: with hybrid drive components); NAG 3	2020	−4.798	5.354	3.243	2.252	1.636	1.211	1.000	0.865	0.717	0.601	8.902	7.977	1.795	1.314	4 Gearsets; 3 Brakes; 3 Clutches	1.111	W	9	A	400 N⋅m (295 lb⋅ft); 500 N⋅m (369 lb⋅ft); 700 N⋅m (516 lb⋅ft); 1,000 N⋅m (738 lb⋅ft)
9AT	JR913E	2019	−4.799	5.425	3.263	2.250	1.649	1.221	1.000	0.862	0.713	0.597	9.091	8.042	1.799	1.318	4 Gearsets; 3 Brakes; 3 Clutches	1.111		9		700 N⋅m (516 lb⋅ft) (Note: see Table 1 · p. 72)

== History ==
Development took place at the group's headquarters in Stuttgart-Untertuerkheim. Initially, the transmission was produced only at the Daimler plant not far away in Stuttgart-Hedelfingen. Since April 2016, the transmission has also been produced at Daimler's subsidiary Star Assembly in Sebeș, Romania.

The transmission was used in the E 350 BlueTEC in 2013 for the first time, and successively replaced both the 7-speed 7G-Tronic (PLUS) transmission and the 5-speed 5G-Tronic transmission. It includes versions for a maximum input torque of 1,000 N⋅m (738 lb⋅ft). The GLE Coupé (C 292) was the first model series to be launched with the 9G-Tronic transmission from the very beginning. The 9G-Tronic was already available as standard in all models (except AMG) at the time of the market launch.

After the 5G- and 7G-Tronic, this is the 3rd generation of modern automatic transmissions, internally identified as NAG 3 (New Automatic Gearbox Generation 3).

== Licensing to Jatco Ltd ==
In 2019, the Jatco Ltd, based in Fuji, Shizuoka, Japan, started licensed production for use in Nissan and Infiniti vehicles. In this version, input torque is limited to 700 N⋅m (516 lb⋅ft), allowing each of the gearsets 1, 2, and 4 to use only three planetary gears. (Note: see cutaway model Figure 4 - p. 72) Slightly modified gear dimensions give it a span of just under 9.1:1.

== Specifications ==
Technical data
Type	725.0			JR913E
Model	W9A 400/500	W9A 700	W9A 900	9AT
Input capacity
Maximum Engine Power				
Maximum Engine Torque	400 N⋅m (295 lb⋅ft); 500 N⋅m (369 lb⋅ft)	700 N⋅m (516 lb⋅ft)	1,000 N⋅m (738 lb⋅ft)	700 N⋅m (516 lb⋅ft)
Maximum Shaft Speed	1st to 7th: 7,000/min			
Maximum Shaft Speed	8th: 5,900/min			
Maximum Shaft Speed	9th: 5,000/min			
Sundry
Torque Converter Lock-up	With torsional + pendulum · can operate in all 9 forward gears			
Torque Converter Size				260 mm (10.24 in)
Length	Overall: 644 mm (25.35 in) to 649 mm (25.55 in) (Note: depending on joint flange and torque converters)			Gearbox only: 439.5 mm (17.30 in)
Fluid Capacity	10.0 L (10.6 US qt)			
Weight (Note: including torque converter and automatic transmission fluid)		94.8 kg (209 lb)		99.5 kg (219 lb)

=== Torque converter ===
One main focus was on increasing shift comfort, which is achieved on the one hand by measures in the control system and on the other hand by designing the torque converter accordingly. The hydrodynamic torque converter was largely taken over from the previous 7G-Tronic transmission.

=== Control system ===
The 9G-Tronic is fully electronically controlled. The shift elements are controlled via a new type of hydraulic direct control with electromagnetically actuated valves, which enables fast and smooth gear changes. Compared to the previous transmission, which had a hydraulic pilot control, leakage losses have been reduced by 80%.

=== Oil supply ===
The transmission is equipped with two oil pumps to ensure an energy-efficient supply of long-life synthetic fuel-economy low-friction oil: a mechanical rotary vane pump with chain drive, which is significantly smaller than its predecessor and located next to the main shaft, and a pump driven by a brushless electric DC motor. The mechanically driven pump is responsible for the basic supply of the transmission, with the flow rate depending on the speed of the drive motor. The additional pump is switched on by the electronic transmission control unit as required. This design enables the lubricating and cooling oil volume flow to be regulated as required and makes the 9G-Tronic start/stop-capable. When the drive motor is at a standstill, the transmission remains ready to start solely due to the supply from the electric auxiliary pump.

Filter elements for the two pumps are integrated in the plastic oil pan.

=== AMG SpeedShift 9G ===
==== AMG SpeedShift TCT 9G ====
The TCT 9G (Torque Converter Technology) transmission is essentially the 9G-Tronic.

==== AMG SpeedShift MCT 9G ====
Mercedes-AMG developed the MCT 9G (Multi Clutch Technology) transmission. It was first introduced in the Mercedes-AMG E 63 4Matic+.

The MCT transmission is essentially the 9G-Tronic with a start-off wet clutch (German: NAK for Nass-Anfahrkupplung) replacing the torque converter. This saves weight and optimises the response to the accelerator pedal input. It is a computer-controlled double-clutching. The MCT acronym refers to this multiple-plate clutch. Its torque is rated at 900 N⋅m (664 lb⋅ft) and it offers 4 drive modes: “C” (Comfort), “S” (Sport), “S+” (Sport plus) and “M” (Manual) and boasts 0.1 second shifts in “M” and “S+” modes. MCT-equipped cars are also fitted with the new AMG Drive Unit as the central control unit for all driving dynamics functions and an innovative Race Start Function.

The driver can change gears either using the steering-wheel shift paddles or conventionally the selector lever. The new Race Start Function is a launch control system that enables maximum acceleration while ensuring optimum traction of the driven wheels.

== Planetary gearset concept ==
=== Improved fuel economy ===
The main objective in replacing the predecessor model was to improve vehicle fuel economy with extra speeds and a wider gear span to allow the engine speed level to be lowered (downspeeding), (Note: First version with a gear ratio span wider than 9.1:1. Was replaced by a slightly more narrowly stepped 2nd version with the introduction of the Mercedes-Benz E-Class (W213) series in 2016 without announcement) which is a decisive factor in improving energy efficiency and thus reducing fuel consumption by 6.5 %. In addition, the lower engine speed level improves the noise-vibration-harshness comfort and the exterior noise is reduced by up to 4 dB(A). A speed of 120 km/h is reached in the Mercedes-Benz E 350 BlueTEC in 9th gear at an engine speed of approx. 1350 rpm. Unsurpassed ratio span among longitudinal automatic transmissions for passenger cars. (Note: By the end of 2024)

=== Reduced manufacturing complexity ===
In order to avoid a further increase in manufacturing complexity while expanding the number of gear ratios, Mercedes-Benz switched from the conventional design method—in which the planetary gearset concept was limited to a purely serial or in-line power flow—to a more modern design method that utilizes a planetary gearset concept with combined parallel and serial power flow. This was only possible thanks to computer-aided design and has resulted in a globally patented gearset concept.

As the design of the predecessor was significantly more complex than that of the direct competitor 6HP and even the new 8HP model from ZF with one more gear, (Note: The ZF 8HP has become the new reference standard (benchmark) for automatic transmissions) the specification sheet also stipulate that at least one shift element must be omitted. The efforts have resulted in a globally patented gearset concept that requires the same installation space as the previous model and is also 1 kg (2.2 lb) lighter. In the process, 85 billion gearset concepts were examined.

After the 5G- and 7G-Tronic, this transmission is the 3rd generation in which in-line epicyclic gearing have been combined with parallel epicyclic gearing. The resulting progress is reflected in an even better ratio between the number of gears and the number of components used compared to all layouts previously used by Mercedes-Benz.

=== Quality ===
The ratios of the 9 gears are better distributed in all versions than in the direct competitors 8HP from ZF and much better than in the 10-speed transmissions from Ford/GM and Aisin/Toyota. The only noticeable weaknesses are the relatively small step between 5th and 6th gear and the too small one between 6th and 7th gear. These cannot be eliminated without affecting all other gears and thus impairing gear steps. On the other hand, these weaknesses are not overly significant.

All in all

- the extra effort, reflected in the acceptable elasticity compared to the ZF 8HP is more than justified and
- compared to the 10-speed gearboxes from Ford/GM and Aisin/Toyota, the absence of the 10th gear is more than compensated for by the significantly better distribution.

Additionally, the gearset brings the ability to shift in a non-sequential manner – going from gear 9 to gear 4 in extreme situations simply by changing one shift element (actuating brake C and releasing brake A).

== Maintenance ==
Compared to the predecessor gearboxes NAG 1 (5G-Tronic) and NAG 2 (7G-Tronic), the NAG 3 gearbox is much more highly integrated, meaning that repairs are only possible by replacing entire assemblies when servicing is required. This applies, for example, to the oil filters permanently integrated in the plastic oil pan. Another example is the fully integrated mechatronic module with sensors, control unit and electrohydraulic shift plate. This module must be replaced as a unit, even if, for example, only one sensor is defective.

== Nomogram ==
Planetary gearSet 1 – Planetary gearSet 2 – Planetary gearSet 3 – Planetary gearSet 4

▶️ Interactive nomogram

This nomogram is a real geometric calculator exactly representing the rotational speeds of the transmission's 3x4 = 12 internal shafts for each of its 9 ratios (+ reverse), grouped according to their 4 permanent coupling on 3 joint ordinates and 5 independent ordinates. These ordinates are positioned on the abscissa in strict accordance with the proportions of the sun gears' teeth numbers relative to those of their rings. Consequently, the output ratios on the 3rd ordinate (carrier of the third planetary gearset) follows closely those of the actual transmission. This advantageous geometric construction sets us free from Robert Willis' famous and tedious formula, because all calculations are exclusively determined by lengths ratios, respectively teeth numbers on the abscissa for the 4 epicyclic ratios, and of rotational speeds on the 3rd ordinate for the 10 gear ratios.

This nomogram reflects the version from 2013.

=== Legend ===
A: Brake (blocks S_{2})
B: Brake (blocks R_{3})
C: Brake (blocks C_{1})
D: Clutch (couples C_{3} with R_{4})
E: Clutch (couples C_{1} with R_{2})
F: Clutch (couples S_{1} with C_{1})

== Applications ==
Variants and applications
Model Make	Car Model (Note: without any claim of completeness)
W9A: Mercedes-Benz
C-Class	2018–2021 W 205 (Note: W 205: all models); 2022–present W 206
E-Class	2014–2016 W 212 E 350 BlueTec (Note: W 212 E 350 BlueTec: pilot model as an option to others); 2016–2023 W 213; 2023–present W 214
S-Class	2017–2021 W 222 (Note: W 222: all except V12 models; only Facelift models); 2021–present W 223
V-Class	2020–present W 447 (Note: W 447: longitudinal engines only)
GLC-Class	2015–2022 GLC (X 253); 2022–present GLC (X 254)
GLE-Class	2016–2019 GLE (W 166) (Note: W 166: except 350 & AMG 63 models); 2020–present GLE (W 167) (Note: W 167: except AMG 63 models)
GLS-Class	2017–2019 GLS (X 166) (Note: X 166: except AMG models); 2020–present GLS (X 167)
SLK-Class	2015–2020 SLC (R 172) (Note: R 172: except AMG 55 models)
W9A: Mercedes-AMG
AMG SL	2022–present AMG SL (R 232)
W9A: other Manufacturer
Aston Martin	2021–present DBX
Jatco Ltd 9AT
Nissan	2020–2024 Titan; 2020–present Frontier; 2023–present Z (RZ 34); 2024–present Patrol; 2025–present Armada
Infiniti	2025– QX 80

== See also ==
- List of Mercedes-Benz transmissions
- List of Jatco transmissions
