= Automatic Drive =

Automatic Drive was the trade name for Studebaker Corporation's first automatic transmission, designed in conjunction with Borg-Warner's Detroit Gear division. Studebaker was one of two independent American auto manufacturers to invest in development and tooling for automatic transmissions, the other being Packard with its Ultramatic product.

Automatic Drive, which combined a three-speed planetary gearset and a lock-up torque converter, debuted in early 1950 as a $201 option on all Studebaker models. Ford, which was without an automatic transmission in 1950, approached Studebaker about buying Automatic Drive units. Studebaker's management refused and thereby lost out on what could have been significant "plus" business.

By 1955, Studebaker was forced to abandon the Automatic Drive because of high production costs, replacing it with a less-expensive Borg Warner unit based on Ford's Ford-O-Matic, which Studebaker called Flight-O-Matic. Borg-Warner continued to build Studebaker's Automatic Drive and market the unit overseas. It was used on British marques including Jaguar, Daimler, Humber and Ford Zephyr/Zodiac.
