= Mercedes-Benz 230 TE =

Mercedes-Benz 230TE may refer to one of two automobiles:

- A variant of the Mercedes-Benz W123
- A variant of the Mercedes-Benz W124
