= Mercedes-Benz 200T =

Mercedes-Benz 200T may refer to one of two automobiles:

- A variant of the Mercedes-Benz W123
- A variant of the Mercedes-Benz W124
