= M123 =

M123 may refer to:

- M-123 (Michigan highway), a state highway
- M123 10-ton 6x6 truck, an American military vehicle
- Mercedes-Benz M123 engine, an automobile engine
