= Mercedes-Benz M103 engine =

Straight-6 cylinder engine from 1984

Mercedes-Benz M 103 engine
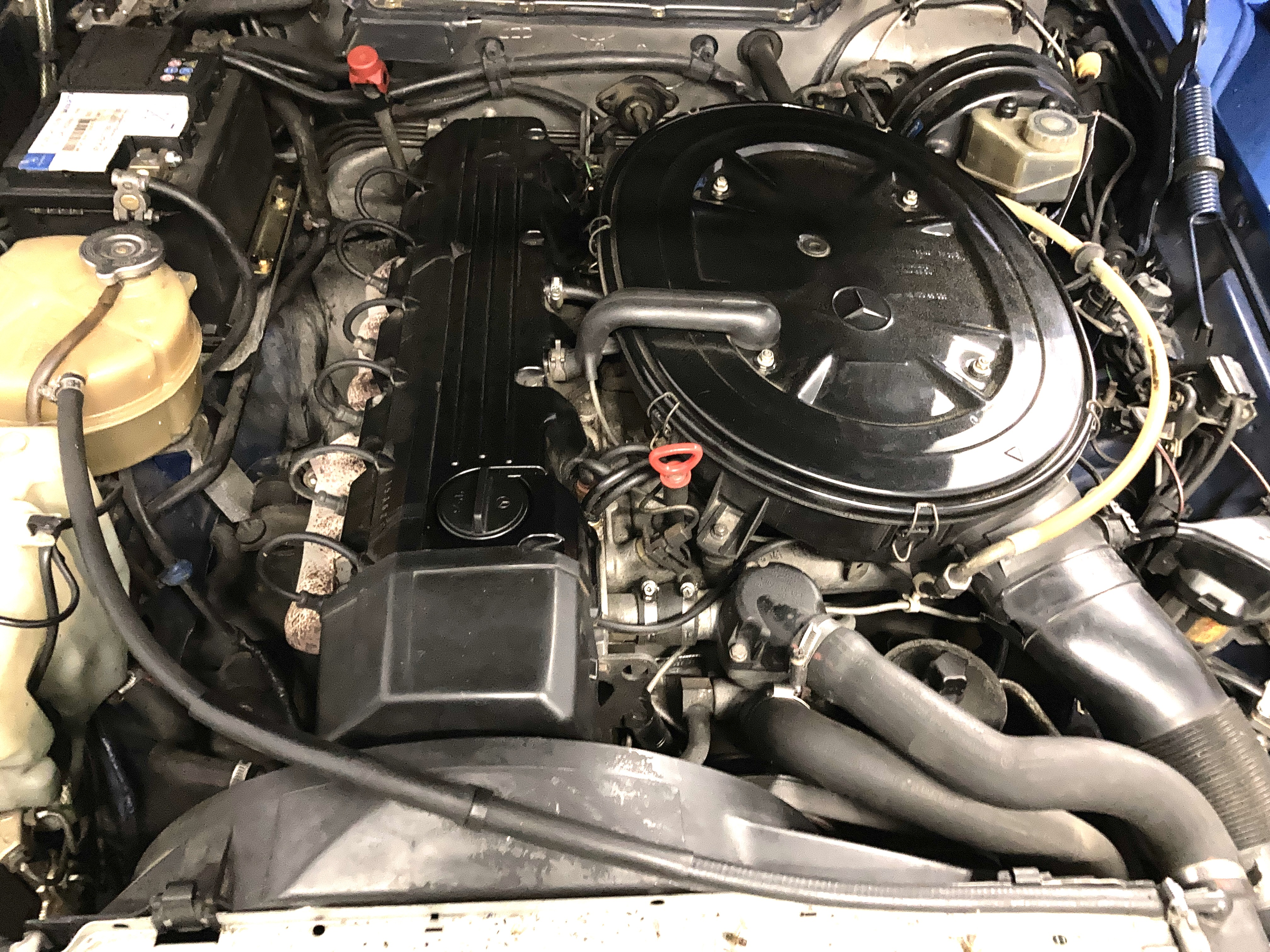

Overview
- Manufacturer: Mercedes-Benz
- Production: 1984–1997

Layout
- Configuration: Naturally aspirated Inline-6
- Displacement: 2,599 cc (158.6 cu in); 2,962 cc (180.8 cu in)
- Cylinder bore: 82.9 mm (3.264 in); 88.5 mm (3.484 in)
- Piston stroke: 80.25 mm (3.159 in)
- Valvetrain: SOHC: 2 valves per cylinder
- Compression ratio: 9.2:1

RPM range
- Max. engine speed: 6200

Combustion
- Fuel system: Continuous Injection System - Electronic
- Fuel type: Gasoline
- Oil system: Wet sump
- Cooling system: Water cooled

Output
- Power output: 118–140 kW (160–190 PS; 158–188 hp)
- Torque output: 220–260 N⋅m (162–192 lb⋅ft)

Chronology
- Predecessor: M 110 & M 123
- Successor: M 104

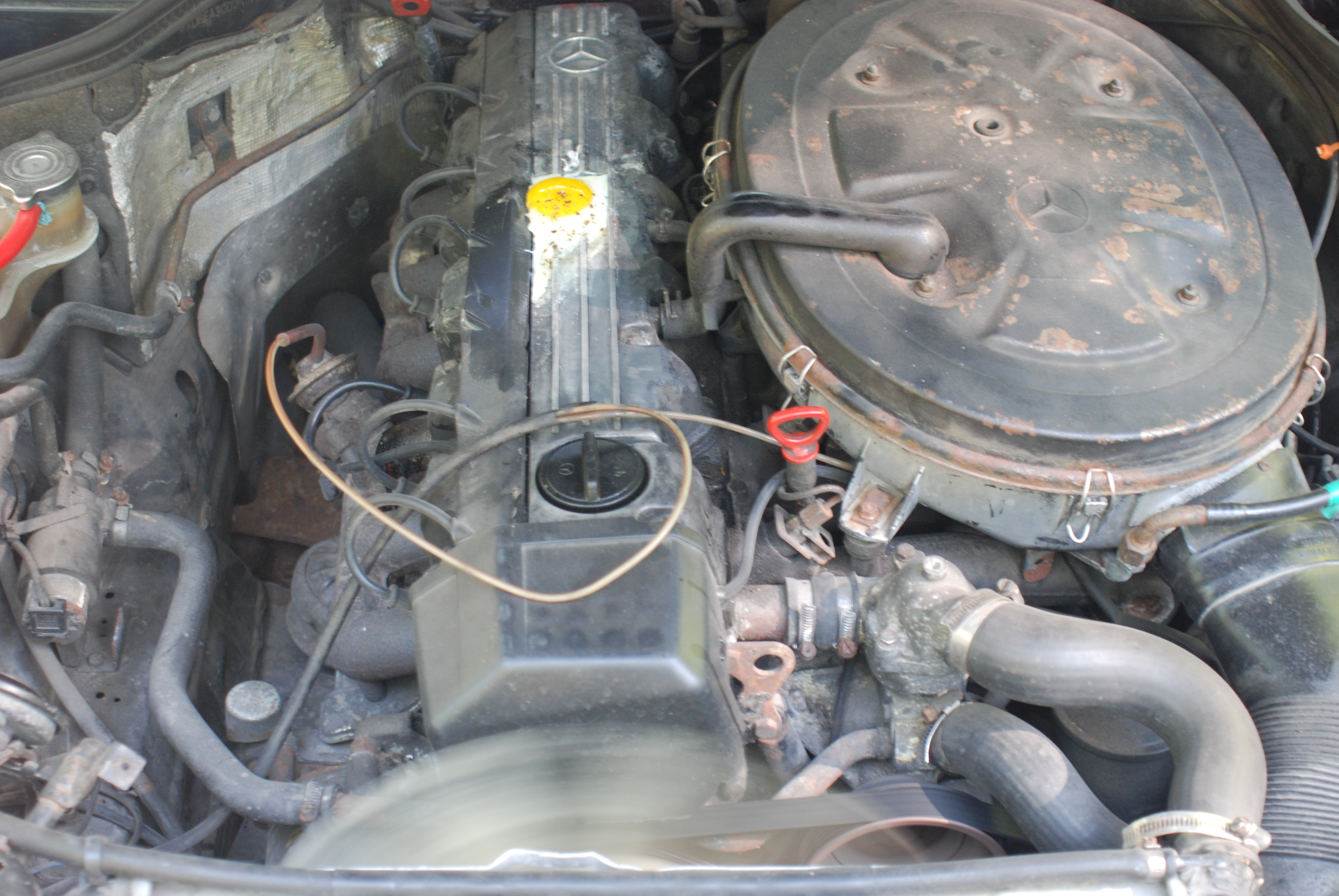
An egg being cooked on a 3.0 L M 103 engine

The Mercedes-Benz M 103 is a 15-degree, straight-6 crossflow cylinder head automobile engine and was in production from 1984 to 1997. It is a single overhead cam design with 2 valves per cylinder. The M 103 was replaced by the M 104 starting in 1989. This engine received several updates over the years of production, one of the updates was a change from a "heart shaped" to a "HEMI" spherical combustion chamber.

== Specifications ==
The only mechanical differences from the M 103 3.0 L to the M 103 2.6 L were the smaller bore and intake valves, with a slightly different airbox. The CIS-E components between 2.6 and 3.0 variants are all shared for any given model year with the exception of the ECU making engine swaps from 2.6 to 3.0 virtually bolt-in.

Car model	260	300
Engine type	M 103 E 26	M 103 E 30
Production period	1984–1997	
Layout
Configuration	Straight-six	
Bore pitch	97 mm (3.819 in)	
Cylinder bore	82.9 mm (3.264 in)	88.5 mm (3.484 in)
Piston stroke	80.25 mm (3.159 in)	
Displacement	2,599 cc (158.6 cu in)	2,962 cc (180.8 cu in)
Max. engine speed	6,200/min	
Combustion
Principle	Internal combustion engine	
Mode of operation	Four-stroke	
Fuel type	gasoline	
Fuel octane	95 RON/85 MON · 91 RON/81MON via plug-in jumper located in the engine compartment	
Fuel system	CIS-E (Continuous Injection System)	
Ignition system	electronic engine control unit	
Firing order	1–5–3–6–2–4	
Valvetrain	SOHC	
Valves per cylinder	2	
Configuration	V-shaped overhead crossflow	
Camshaft drive	simple roller-type chain	
Aspiration	Naturally aspirated	
Compression ratio	9.2 : 1	
Management
Lubrication	pressure circulation with wet sump	
Oil capacity	6 L (1.6 US gal; 1.3 imp gal)	
Cooling	water cooled engine cooling	
Coolant capacity	8.5 L (2.2 US gal; 1.9 imp gal)	
Starter motor	1.5 kW (2.04 PS; 2.01 hp) electrical motor · since Jan 1988: 1.7 kW (2.31 PS; 2.28 hp)	
Performance
Power w/ catalyst	118 kW (160 PS; 158 hp)	132 kW (179 PS; 177 hp) (Note: Manufacturer's figure: 180 PS)
@ engine speed	5,800/min	5,700/min
Torque w/ catalyst	220 N⋅m (162 lb⋅ft)	255 N⋅m (188 lb⋅ft)
@ engine speed	4,600/min	4,400/min
Power w/o catalyst	125 kW (170 PS; 168 hp)	140 kW (190 PS; 188 hp)
@ engine speed	5,800/min	5,700/min
Torque w/o catalyst	228 N⋅m (168 lb⋅ft)	260 N⋅m (192 lb⋅ft)
@ engine speed	4,600/min	4,400/min
Applications
W 201	190 E 2.6	
W 124	260 E · 300 E 2.6	300 E
W 126	260 SE	300 SE · 300 SEL
R 107		300 SL
R 129		300 SL
W 463		300 GE
Isdera		Isdera Spyder 036i

== Data accuracy ==
The M 102 and M 103 engine family has with the M 104 E 30 a common piston stroke of 80.25 mm. As only one decimal place is usually given, a large number of publications are in circulation with the incomplete specification of 80.2 mm. This applies in particular to more recent publications after production was discontinued. As a result, the inaccurate figures of 2,597 cc instead of the actual 2,599 cc for the 2.6 l engine and 2,960 cc instead of 2,962 cc for the 3.0 l engine have become established.

There is no evidence anywhere that there are two crankshafts with different strokes. (Note: Four in total: two for 4-cylinder M 102 and; two for 6-cylinder M 103 and M 104 E 30)

Car model	200	230	260	300
Engine	M 102		M 103 · M 104	
Engine type	M 102 V 20 M 102 E 20	M 102 E 23 M 102 E 23/2	M 103 E 26	M 103 E 30 M 104 E 30
Configuration	Straight-four		Straight-six	
Cylinder bore	89 mm (3.504 in)	95.5 mm (3.760 in)	82.9 mm (3.264 in)	88.5 mm (3.484 in)
Complete piston stroke	80.25 mm (3.159 in)			
Accurate displacement	1,997 cc (121.9 cu in); 1,996.99 cc (121.864 cu in)	2,299 cc (140.3 cu in); 2,299.33 cc (140.314 cu in)	2,599 cc (158.6 cu in); 2,598.93 cc (158.596 cu in)	2,962 cc (180.8 cu in); 2,961.92 cc (180.747 cu in)
Incomplete piston stroke	80.2 mm (3.157 in)			
Inaccurate displacement	1,996 cc (121.8 cu in); 1,995.74 cc (121.788 cu in)	2,298 cc (140.2 cu in); 2,297.90 cc (140.226 cu in)	2,597 cc (158.5 cu in); 2,597.31 cc (158.498 cu in)	2,960 cc (180.6 cu in); 2,960.07 cc (180.635 cu in)
