= Mercedes-Benz M102 engine =

Straight-4 cylinder engine from 1980

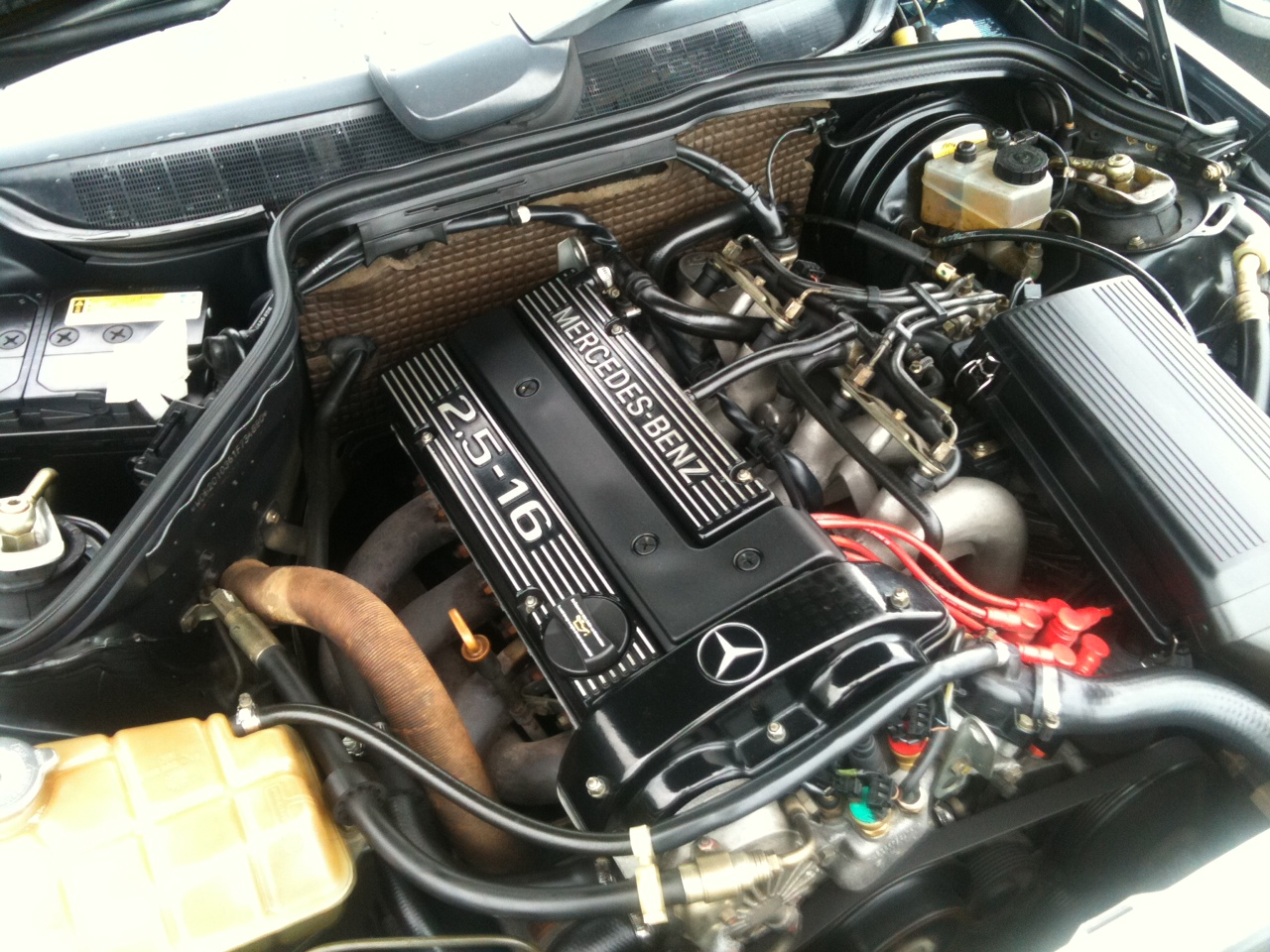

Overview
- Manufacturer: Mercedes-Benz
- Production: 1980–1995

Layout
- Configuration: Straight-4
- Displacement: 1.7 L (1,737 cc); 1.8 L (1,797 cc); 2.0 L (1,997 cc); 2.3 L (2,299 cc); 2.5 L (2,498 cc); 2.5 L (2,463 cc)
- Cylinder bore: 87.5 mm (3.445 in); 89 mm (3.504 in); 95.5 mm (3.760 in); 97.3 mm (3.831 in)
- Piston stroke: 72.2 mm (2.843 in); 80.25 mm (3.159 in); 87.2 mm (3.433 in); 82.8 mm (3.260 in)
- Valvetrain: SOHC 2 valves per cylinder; DOHC 4 valves per cylinder
- Compression ratio: 10.5:1

Combustion
- Fuel system: Stromberg 175 CDT Carburetor; Pierburg 2 E-E Carburetor; Multi-point fuel injection
- Management: Bosch KE-Jetronic
- Fuel type: Gasoline
- Cooling system: Water-cooled

Output
- Power output: 63–173 kW (86–235 PS; 84–232 hp)
- Torque output: 154–245 N⋅m (114–181 lb⋅ft)

Dimensions
- Dry weight: 118 kg (260 lb)

Chronology
- Predecessor: Mercedes-Benz M115 engine
- Successor: Mercedes-Benz M111 engine

The M102 family is a inline-four gasoline automobile engine family built by Mercedes-Benz from 1980 until 1995. It was the first of a new generation of modular engines that replaced the M115, a derivative of the M121 engine in production since 1955.

It would be complemented by the derived OM601 diesel engine in 1983 and the M103 six cylinder petrol and OM602 and OM603 five and six cylinder diesel engines in 1985.

This family of motors was a clean sheet design featuring thin walled cast iron cylinder block facilitating 30-40 kg reduction in weight, as compared to the predecessor. The 15 degree offset of the cylinder bank allowed for better engine balancing and more compact placing. The cylinder head featured a hemispherical cross-fire combustion chamber.

The M102 was the first 4 cylinder engine to feature multi-point fuel injection, and they would systematically replace the carburetor models towards the end of production. Later models added hydraulically adjusted valve lash and catalytic converters.

The M102 was also the first MB engine to introduce 4-valve per cylinder DOHC cylinder heads, originally developed by Cosworth for racing, they would power the 190E 2.3-16 and later the 2.5-16 performance versions.

Ultimately it would be replaced by the derived M111 engine, with the in-house developed DOHC cylinder heads in 1992-1993, though some models would continue to use the SOHC M102, particularly on the commercial W461 G-Wagen and the TN van until the mid-1990s.

== 1.8 and 1.7 litre ==
=== M102.910 ===
Used in the W201 190E 1.8 from 1990 onwards (badged as 180E in Australia from 1991 to 1993). Displacement: 1,797 cc (109.7 cu in). Power output: 80 kW (109 PS; 107 hp). Torque: 154 N⋅m (114 lb⋅ft)

Applications:

- 1990–1993 W201 190E 1.8 (180E in Australia)

=== M102.919 ===
Downsleeved variant used in the W201 190E 1.7 from May 1992 onwards for export to Portugal only, where there was a major tax threshold at 1.75 litres. Displacement: 1,737 cc (106.0 cu in). Power output: 77 kW (105 PS; 103 hp) at 5500 rpm. Torque 148 N⋅m (109 lb⋅ft) at 3700 rpm.

Applications:

- 1992–1993 W201 190E 1.7

== 2.0 litre carbureted ==
=== M102.920 ===
The M102.920 was a 2.0 L engine with an bore and stroke 89 mm × 80.25 mm (3.504 in × 3.159 in). Equipped with a Stromberg carburetor 175 CDT. Displacement: 1,997 cc (2.0 L). Power output: 80 kW (109 PS; 107 bhp). Swedish and Swiss market models developed 98 PS (72 kW) at 5000 rpm thanks to their stricter emissions regulations.

Applications:

- 1980–1986 W123 200
- 1980–1986 W123 200T

=== M102.921 ===
Similar to M102.920, but less power due to a different camshaft and different carburetor. Power Output: 66 kW (90 PS; 89 hp)

Applications:

- 1983–1985 W201 190 (201.022)

=== M102.922 ===
An update of the M102.920 engine for use in the W124 chassis, Displacement: 1,997 cc (121.9 cu in). Power output: 80 kW (109 PS; 107 hp).

Applications:

- 1985–1992 W124 200

=== M102.924 ===
Similar to M102.921, different carburetor, single-belt drive for alternator, power steering pump and air-conditioning compressor (where fitted). Hydraulic aided valvetrain. Power output: 77 kW (105 PS; 103 hp).

Applications:

- 1986–1990 W201 190 (201.023)

=== M102.938 ===
Low compression version of M102.921. Power output: 63 kW (86 PS; 84 hp).

Applications:

- W201 190

=== M102.939 ===
Low compression version of M102.920. Power output: 74 kW (101 PS; 99 hp).

Applications:

- W123 200
- W123 200T

== 2.0 litre fuel injected ==
=== M102.961 ===
A 2.0 L multi-point fuel-injected (KE-Jetronic) variation of the M102.921. An "E" was added to the model of the vehicle (standing for "einspritzung", the German word for fuel injection). This engine is identified by TSZ ignition and multiple belts for the alternator, power steering and air conditioning compressor (where fitted). Displacement: 1,997 cc (121.9 cu in). Power output: 90 kW (122 PS; 121 bhp)

Application

- 1983–1985 W201 190E
- 1984 Apal Francochamps

=== M102.962 ===
An update to the M102.961 introduced in 1985. This is identified by the EZL ignition system and a single accessory drive belt. Displacement: 1,997 cc (121.9 cu in). Power output: 87–90 kW (118–122 PS; 117–121 hp).

Applications:

- 1985–1993 W201 190E

=== M102.963 ===
2.0–litre version with KE-Jetronic fuel injection. Displacement: 1,997 cc (121.9 cu in). Power output: 90 kW (122 PS; 121 hp)

Applications:

- 1985–1992 W201 190E, W124 200TE

=== M102.964 ===
2.0–litre version with KE-Jetronic fuel injection for the W 460 for Italian export. Displacement: 1,997 cc (121.9 cu in). Power output: 90 kW (122 PS; 121 hp)

Applications:

- 1986–1989 W 460 200 GE.

== 2.3 litre ==
=== M102.944 ===
The M102.944 was a 2.3 L version with a 95.5 mm (3.760 in) bore and the same 80.25 mm (3.159 in) stroke. Displacement was 2,299 cc (140.3 cu in). It was powered by a Stromberg 175 CDTU carburetor and had a 7.2 compression ratio. Output: 80 kW (109 PS; 107 hp) at 5300 RPM. Torque 174 Nm at 2000 RPM. It was used exclusively on the W460 G-wagen for extra-European export.

Applications:

- 1986–1989 W 460 230 G.

=== M102.980 ===
The M102.980 was a 2.3 L version with a 95.5 mm (3.760 in) bore and the same 80.25 mm (3.159 in) stroke. Engine weight was 118 kg (260 lb). Used K-Jetronic fuel injection. Displacement: 2,299 cc (140.3 cu in). Power output: 100 kW (136 PS; 134 hp)

Applications:

- 1980–1986 W123 230E
- 1980–1986 W123 230CE
- 1980–1986 W123 230TE

=== M102.981 ===
The M102.981 was a 2.3 L version with a 95.5 mm (3.760 in) bore and the same 80.25 mm (3.159 in) stroke. Displacement: 2,299 cc (140.3 cu in). Power output: 92 kW (125 PS; 123 hp)

Applications:

- 1979–1989 W 460 230 GE Geländewagen

=== M102.982 ===
Similar to the M102.980 version, but with the newer KE-Jetronic system from Bosch. Displacement: 2,299 cc (140.3 cu in). Power output: 97 kW (132 PS; 130 hp)

Applications:

- 1985–1992 W124 230E
- 1985–1992 W124 230CE
- 1985–1992 W124 230TE

=== M102.985 ===
An 8-valve M102 with a displacement of 2.3 L used in the W201 chassis with KE-Jetronic fuel injection. Displacement: 2,299 cc (140.3 cu in). Power output: 97 kW (132 PS; 130 hp)

Applications:

- 1985–1992 W201 190 E 2.3

== 16-valve ==
=== M102.983 ===
A 16-valve version of the M102.985 with cylinder head designed by Cosworth. Displacement: 2,299 cc (140.3 cu in). Power output: 138 kW (188 PS; 185 hp); USA: 125 kW (170 PS; 168 hp)

Applications:

- 1986–1987 W201 190E 2.3-16
- 1985–1989 Isdera Spyder 033i 2.3-16V

=== M102.990 ===
An update of the 16-valve version with increased capacity (2.5 L) and stiffening ribs, still with a cylinder head designed by Cosworth. Displacement: 2,498 cc (152.4 cu in). Power output: 150 kW (204 PS; 201 hp)

Applications:

- 1988–1993 W201 190E 2.5-16

=== M102.991 ===
An update of the 2.5 16-valve version, with shorter stroke and larger bore. H beam rods and piston cooling jets. Displacement: 2,463 cc (150.3 cu in). Power output: 147 kW (200 PS; 197 hp)

Applications:

- 1989 W201 190E 2.5-16 Evolution

=== M102.992 ===
An update of the 102.991 version with removal of four crankshaft counterweights and even more stiffening ribs for higher RPMs. Single timing chain, oil pump with separate drive chain. Bigger intake manifold, camshaft and exhaust system. Higher compression ratio 10.5:1. Displacement: 2,463 cc (150.3 cu in). Power output: 173 kW (235 PS; 232 hp)

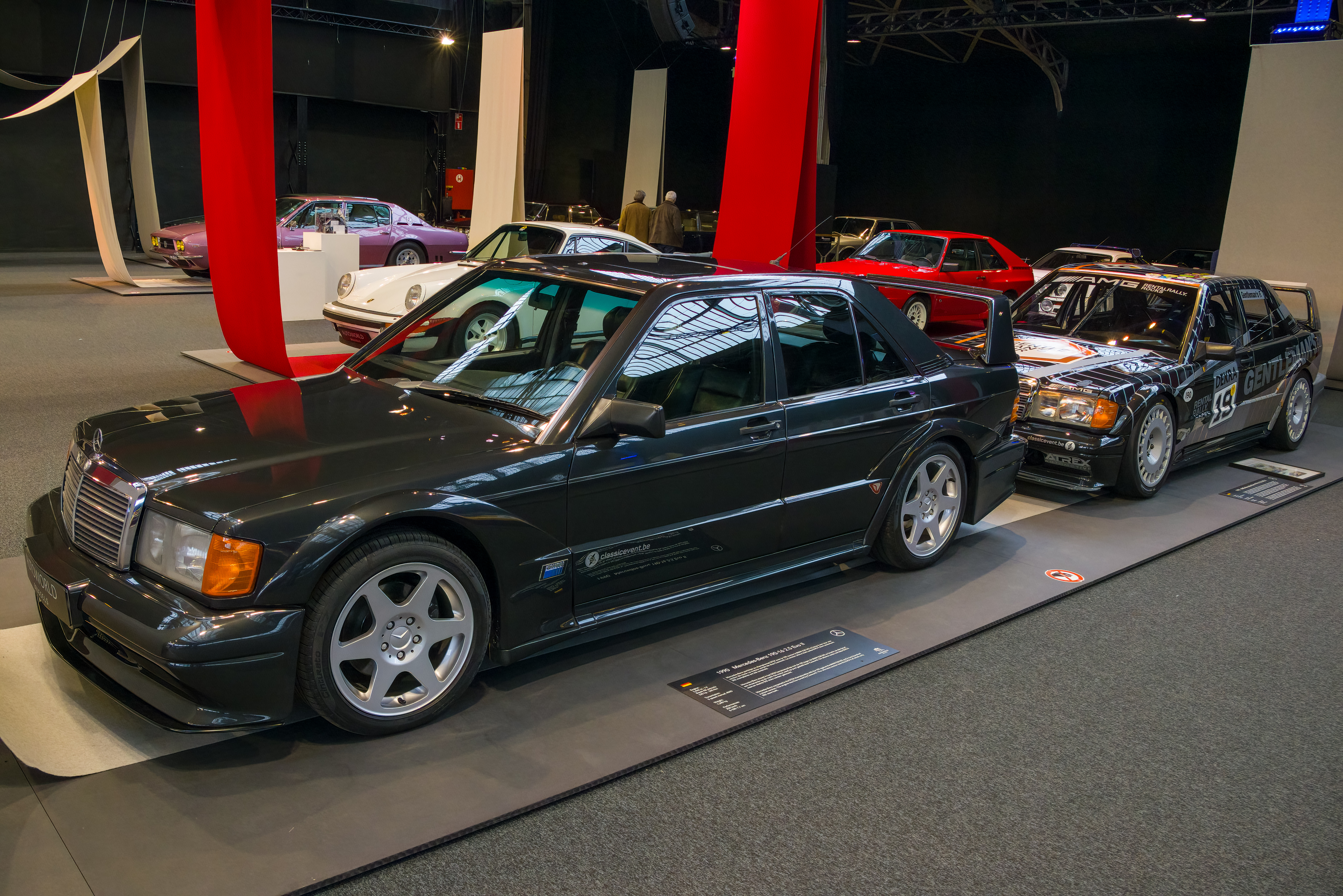

Applications:

- 1990 W201 190E 2.5-16 Evolution II

== Data accuracy ==
The M 102 and M 103 engine family has with the M 104 E 30 a common piston stroke of 80.25 mm. As only one decimal place is usually given, a large number of publications are in circulation with the incomplete specification of 80.2 mm. This applies in particular to more recent publications after production was discontinued. As a result, the inaccurate figures of 1,996 cc instead of the actual 1,997 cc for the 2.0 l engine and 2,298 cc instead of 2,299 cc for the 2.3 l engine are sometimes listed.

There is no evidence anywhere that there are two crankshafts with different strokes.

== See also ==
- List of Mercedes-Benz engines
