= Mercedes-Benz M110 engine =

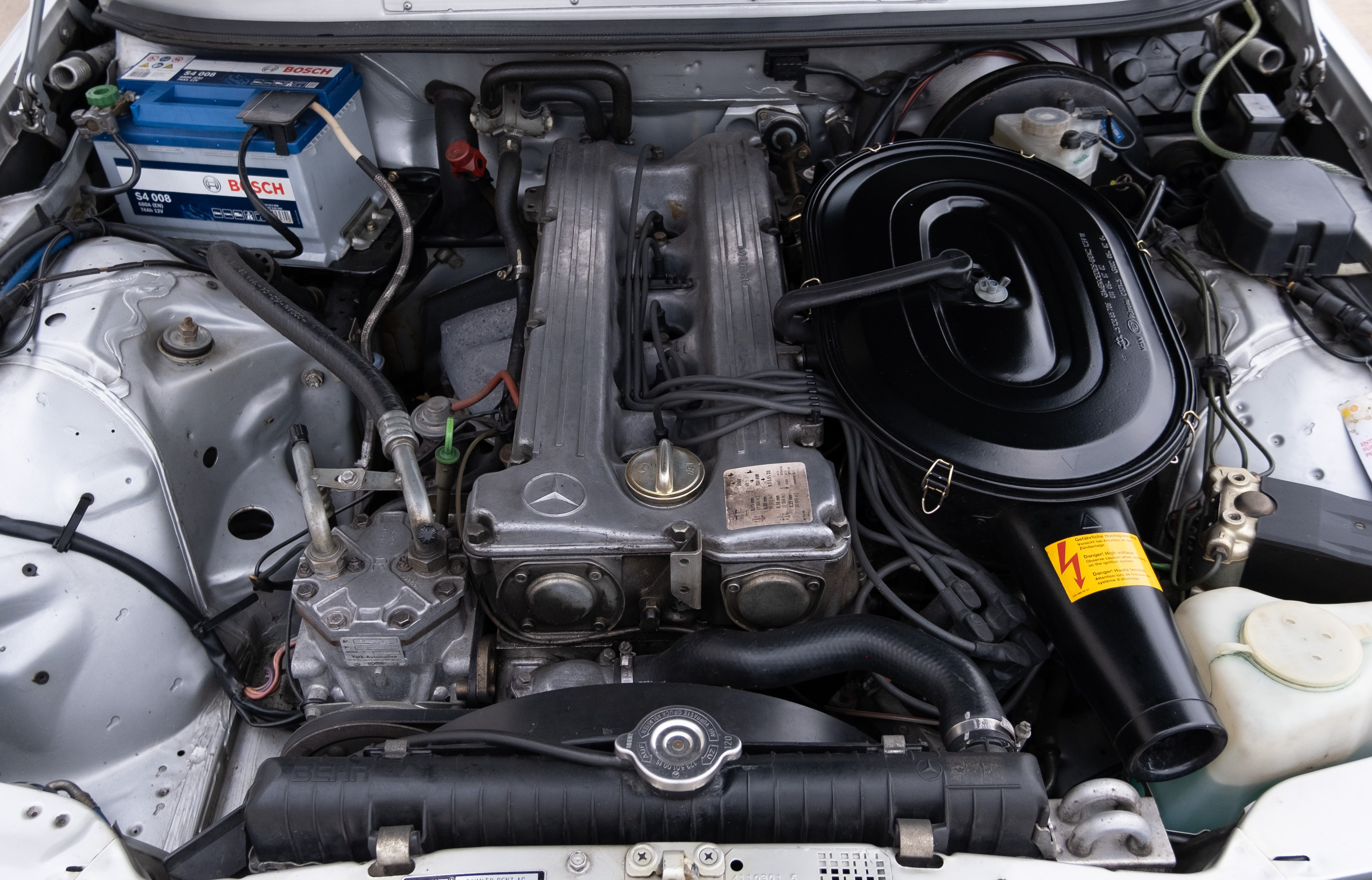

Overview
- Manufacturer: Mercedes-Benz
- Production: 1972–1991

Layout
- Configuration: Naturally aspirated Straight-6
- Displacement: 2.7 L (2,746 cc)
- Cylinder bore: 86 mm (3.39 in)
- Piston stroke: 78.8 mm (3.10 in)
- Valvetrain: DOHC 2 valves x cyl.
- Compression ratio: 9.0:1

Combustion
- Fuel system: Solex 4A1 carburetor Fuel injection
- Management: Bosch Jetronic
- Fuel type: Gasoline
- Oil system: Pressure circulation
- Cooling system: Water cooled

Output
- Power output: 105–136 kW (143–185 PS; 141–182 hp)
- Torque output: 226–240 N⋅m (167–177 lb⋅ft)

Chronology
- Predecessor: M180
- Successor: M103

The M110 engine family is a straight-6 DOHC (double overhead cam) crossflow cylinder head design with 2 valves per cylinder automobile engine made by Mercedes-Benz in the 1970s and 1980s.

The M110.92x and .93x engines are carburetor engines, with Solex 4A1 carburetor.

The M110.98x and .99x engines are fuel-injected engines, with Bosch D-Jetronic up to the .983 and K-Jetronic from the .984.

All M110 engines have a displacement of 2.7 L; 167.6 cu in (2,746 cc) and a bore and stroke of 86 mm × 78.8 mm (3.39 in × 3.10 in). Firing order is 1-5-3-6-2-4. Amount of coolant in the radiator was 11 litres (2.9 US gal; 2.4 imp gal) from 1972 and 12 litres (3.2 US gal; 2.6 imp gal) from 1980s and on. Amount of oil (lubricant) in engine was 6 litres (1.6 US gal; 1.3 imp gal). Lubrication system was pressure circulation lubrication system. Number of valves was 1 intake, 1 exhaust with V-shaped overhead configuration, acted by rocker arms. Valve operation was 2 top camshafts and camshaft drive was duplex roller-type chain.

The M110 .92x and .93x carburetor engines were replaced by the SOHC 2.6L M103 while .98x and .99x fuel-injected engines were replaced by 3.0L M103 starting in 1986.

== M110.921 / M110.931 ==
The .931 is the low-compression version of the .921.

- Power output of .921: 118 kW (160 PS; 158 hp) at 5500 rpm.
- Power output of .931: 107 kW (145 PS; 143 hp) at 5500 rpm.

Applications:

- 1972-1976 280 (W114)
- 1972-1976 280C (W114)

== M110.922 / M110.932 ==
The .932 is the low-compression version of the .922.

Power output of .922: 118 kW (160 PS; 158 hp) at 5500 rpm.
Power output of .932: 107 kW (145 PS; 143 hp) at 5500 rpm.

Applications:

- 1972-1980 280S (W116)

== M110.923 ==
Power output: 115 kW (156 PS; 154 hp) at 5500 rpm, or 105 kW (143 PS; 141 hp) at 5500 rpm for the low-compression version.

Applications:

- 1975-1981 280 (W123)
- 1975-1981 280C (C123)

== M110.924 ==
Power output: 115 kW (156 PS; 154 hp) at 5500 rpm, or 105 kW (143 PS; 141 hp) at 5500 rpm for the low-compression version.

Applications:

- 1979-1985 280S (W126)

== M110.926 ==
Power output: 115 kW (156 PS; 154 hp) at 5500 rpm, or 105 kW (143 PS; 141 hp) at 5500 rpm for the low-compression version.

Applications:

- 1979-1985 280S (W126)

== M110.981 / M110.991 ==
The M110.981 uses Bosch D-Jetronic injection. This system senses the ambient temperature, engine temperature, intake manifold underpressure and throttle valve position and calculates with an analog computer how many milliseconds the fuel injectors should stay open per revolution.

The .991 is the low-compression version of the .981.

Power output of .981: 136 kW (185 PS; 182 hp) at 6000 rpm and 176 lb⋅ft (239 N⋅m) of torque at 4500 rpm.
Power output of .991: 125 kW (170 PS; 168 hp) at 6000 rpm.

Applications:

- 1972-1976 280E (W114)
- 1972-1976 280CE (W114)

== M110.982 / M110.992 ==
The .992 is the low-compression version of the .982.

Power output of .982: 136 kW (185 PS; 182 hp) at 6000 rpm.
Power output of .992: 125 kW (170 PS; 168 hp) at 6000 rpm.

Applications:

- 1973-1976 Mercedes-Benz 280SL (R107)
- 1973-1976 Mercedes-Benz 280SLC (C107)

== M110.983 / M110.993 ==
The .993 is the low-compression version of the .983.

Power output of .983: 136 kW (185 PS; 182 hp) at 6000 rpm.
Power output of .993: 125 kW (170 PS; 168 hp) at 6000 rpm.

Applications:

- 1972-1975 280SE (W116)
- 1972-1975 280SEL (V116)

== M110.984 ==
The M110.984 was the first engine with the new Bosch K-Jetronic injection. This system is mechanical. The air that is taken in is weighed to then determine the amount of fuel to inject.

Power output: 130 kW (177 PS; 174 hp) at 6000 rpm up to April 1978; 136 kW (185 PS; 182 hp) at 5800 rpm from April 1978.

Applications:

- 1975-1981 280E (W123)
- 1975-1981 280CE (C123)
- 1975-1981 280TE (S123)

== M110.985 ==
Power output: 132 kW (179 PS; 177 hp) at 6000 rpm up to April 1978; 136 kW (185 PS; 182 hp) at 5800 rpm from April 1978.

Applications:

- 1976-1980 280SE (W116)
- 1976-1980 280SEL (V116)

== M110.986 ==
Power output: 132 kW (179 PS; 177 hp) at 6000 rpm up to April 1978; 136 kW (185 PS; 182 hp) at 5800 rpm from April 1978.

Applications:

- 1976-1985 280SL (R107)
- 1976-1981 280SLC (C107)

== M110.987 ==
Power output: 136 kW (185 PS; 182 hp) at 5800 rpm. Maximum torque: 240 N⋅m (177 lb⋅ft) at 4500 rpm. Compression ratio: 9.0:1

Applications:

- 1979-1985 280SE (W126)
- 1979-1985 280SEL (V126)

== M110.988 ==
Maximum output was 136 kW (185 PS; 182 hp) at 5800 rpm
Maximum torque was 240 N⋅m (177 lb⋅ft) at 4500 rpm
The compression ratio was 9.0:1.

Applications:

- 1978-1986 280E (W123)
- 1978-1986 280TE (S123)
- 1978-1986 280CE (C123)

== M110.989 ==
Power output: 136 kW (185 PS; 182 hp) at 5800 rpm.
Maximum torque: 240 N⋅m (177 lb⋅ft) at 4500 rpm.
The compression ratio: 9.0:1.

Applications:

- 1981.10-1985 280SE (W126)
- 1981.10-1985 280SEL (V126)

== M110.990 ==
Power output: 136 kW (185 PS; 182 hp) at 5800 rpm.

Applications:

- 1976-1985 280SL (R107)
- 1976-1981 280SLC (C107)

== M110.994 ==
This engine was specifically produced for the G-Class Geländewagen. It has a low compression ratio. It uses K-Jetronic.

Power output: 115 kW (156 PS; 154 hp) at 5250 rpm up to 1984; 110 kW (150 PS; 148 hp) at 5250 rpm from 1984. Torque: 226 N⋅m (167 lb⋅ft) at 4250 rpm.

Applications:

- 1979-1991 280GE (W460)

== M110.998/995 by AMG ==
Own tuning version of the 2.7-liter M110 engine was presented at the end of the 70s by the then independent AMG division for the W123 models (sedan, coupe and station wagon) and W116 in long and short body versions. After modifications by specialists from Affalterbach, the power of naturally aspirated engine increased from the standard 136 kW (185 PS; 182 hp) and 240 N⋅m (177 lb⋅ft) of torque up to 156 kW (212 PS; 209 hp) and 255 N⋅m (188 lb⋅ft).

Applications:

- 1979–1981 Mercedes-Benz W123 by AMG (280E/280TE/280CE)
- 1979–1981 Mercedes-Benz W116 by AMG (280SE/280SEL)

== See also ==
- List of Mercedes-Benz engines
