= Mercedes-Benz M123 engine =

Mercedes-Benz M123
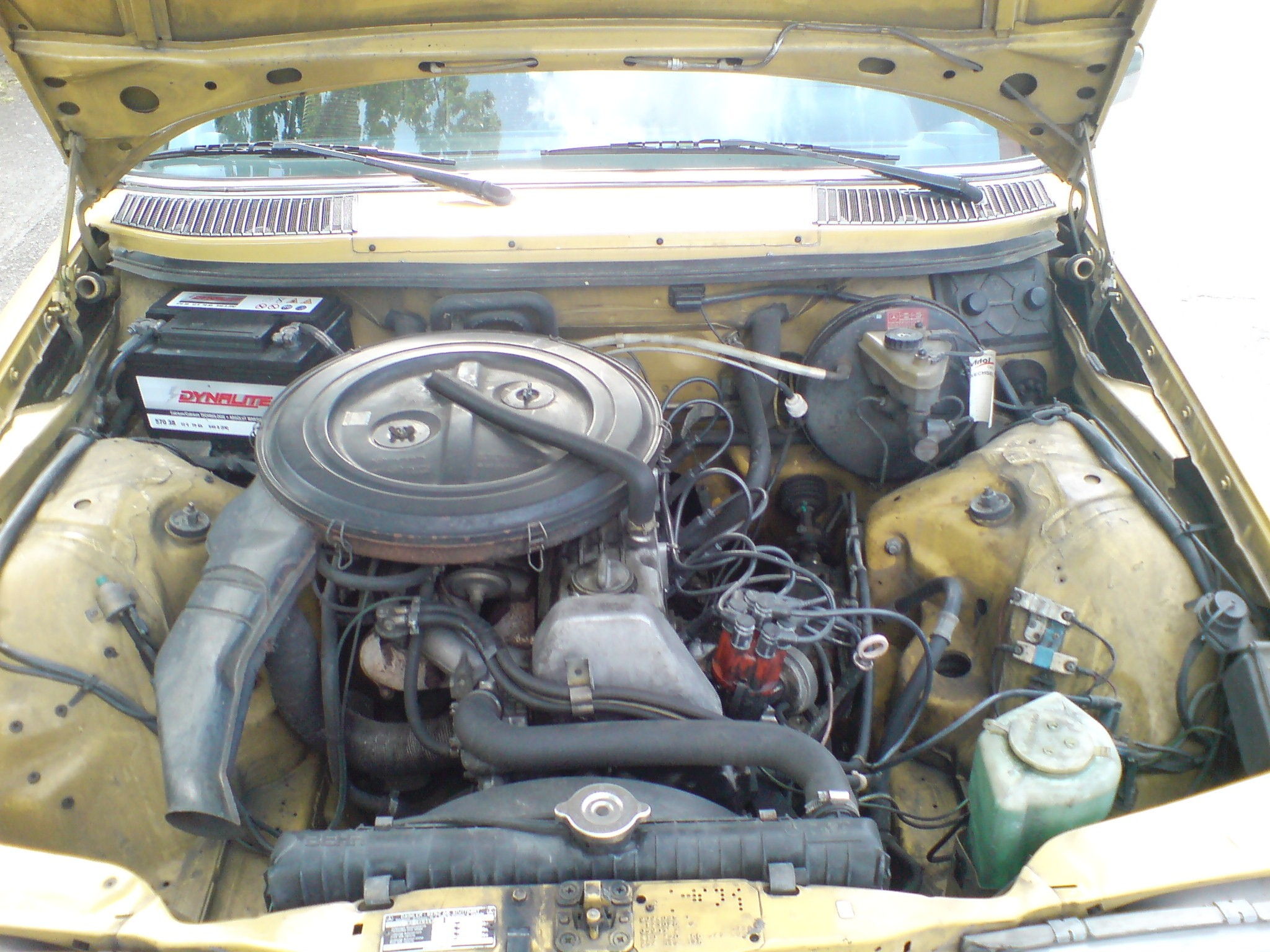
- M123.920 engine

Overview
- Manufacturer: Mercedes-Benz
- Production: 1976–1984

Layout
- Configuration: Naturally aspirated Straight-6
- Displacement: 2.5 L (2,525 cc)
- Cylinder bore: 86 mm (3.39 in)
- Piston stroke: 72.45 mm (2.85 in)
- Valvetrain: SOHC

Combustion
- Fuel system: Solex 4A1 carburetor
- Fuel type: Petrol
- Cooling system: Water cooled

Output
- Power output: 95–104 kW (129–141 PS; 127–139 hp)
- Torque output: 196–200 N⋅m (145–148 lb⋅ft)

Chronology
- Predecessor: M180
- Successor: M103

The M123 is a family of 2.5 L (2,525 cc) straight-6 overhead cam Mercedes-Benz automobile engines developed for its new W123 range, and used from 1976 to 1984 on the 250 and 250 T models. Employing natural aspiration and a 4-barrel carburetor, it replaced the 6-cylinder engines M180 in the 230 and M130 in the 250 (2.8 liter) versions derived from the W114 series.

The M123 was succeeded by the M103, introduced in 1984 with the W124 series.

== Characteristics ==
Like the M180, the M123 only has four crankshaft bearings and its oil pump, fuel pump and distributor are driven by a shaft inclined at the front end of the motor, which in turn is driven through a sprocket and a helical gear pair.

Unlike the M180's paired cylinder spacing, the M123’s is uniform like in the M130. So, instead of cooling ducts cast between the cylinders, slots in the cylinders’ partition walls are traversed by coolant.

The engine has a single overhead camshaft (SOHC), driven by a chain. The vertical hanging valves are arranged in two rows, operated by rocker levers. As with the M115, inlet and outlet both are on the right side of the engine. Within the cylinder head there is (on the left side of the engine) a recessed combustion chamber (with a flat piston crown), in which the exhaust valve and the spark plug are located while the remaining area (on the right side) forms a squish area that is intended to swirl the fuel-air-mixture in the combustion chamber.

Fuel-air mixture was generated by a 4-barrell Solex 4A1 carburetor. As with the previous model W114, it has two mechanically operated primary and two vacuum-actuated secondary barrels, configured with two sets of mixing systems feeding three cylinders apiece, each composed of a relatively small mixing system for idling and a second larger system for higher load and higher speeds. At idle and up to about one-third load only the smaller tube of each set is mechanically operated by the accelerator pedal, while the second tube of each set is enabled by a vacuum cell only at high load and high engine speed. All four (2 x 2) tubes are supplied with fuel by a central float chamber. The engine is equipped with gasoline feed and return lines (usually found on fuel injection engines), achieving a cooling effect on the gas to protect against vapor locks that would cause starting problems in hot weather.

The M123’s relatively quiet operation was marred by high gasoline consumption, although the engine met its most important development goal of being more economical than the carbureted 280 models.

== History ==
While the rest of the 123 series’ engine range was taken over from its predecessor satisfactorily, the M123 did not quite convince customers, although it is the only engine that was newly developed for this series.

In 1979 the engine was upgraded and power output increased from 95 kW (129 PS; 127 hp) to 103 kW (140 PS; 138 hp). But especially after the launch of the new four-cylinder M102 in the 200 and 230 E models, customer interest fell sharply since the M102 did almost everything better while its petrol consumption was significantly lower.

In October 1981, the engine was further revised to reduce consumption by changing the combustion chambers in the cylinder head.

In 1982 the M123 (250 T) was dropped from the estate; although it remained available until 1985 in the sedan (250), its sales fell off badly.

The M123’s direct replacement, the 2.6 liter variant of the M103 (starting 1984), was better in every way: that engine not only was cheaper to produce, lighter and much more fuel-efficient, it was running smoother and also had more power was freer revving than the more sedate M123.

More than 30 years after its introduction, the M123 is now regarded as a somewhat classic Mercedes-Benz engine.

The capable but complex 4-barrell Solex 4A1 carburetor is seen nowadays as difficult to repair and adjust. With prevalence of the three-way catalytic converter (needing specific air fuel ratio) complex double-register carburetors became obsolete and were replaced temporarily by electronically controlled simpler carburetors then by more reliable, easier maintained fuel injection systems.

== M123.920 ==
The M123.920 was a 2.5 L (2,525 cc) engine with a bore and stroke of 86 mm × 72.45 mm (3.39 in × 2.85 in). Power output was 96 kW (131 PS; 129 hp) at 5,500 rpm, Torque 196 N⋅m (145 lb⋅ft) at 3,500 rpm. 1976 - September 1979.

Applications:

- 1976-1979 250
- 1976-1979 250T
- 1979-1985 250 Long (base 3.425 mm (0.1348 in))
- 1976-1979 250 chassis with elongated base

== M123.921 ==
The revised M123.921 was also a 2.5 L (2,525 cc) engine. Power output was 104 kW (141 PS; 139 hp) at an unchanged 5,500 rpm, Torque 200 N⋅m (148 lb⋅ft) at 3,500 rpm. September 1979 - December 1985.

Applications:

- 1979-1985 250
- 1979-1985 250T
- 1979-1985 250 Long (base 3.425 mm (0.1348 in))
- 1979-1985 250 chassis with elongated base (3.425 mm (0.1348 in))

== See also ==
- Mercedes-Benz M180 engine
- List of Mercedes-Benz engines
