= Mercedes-Benz W123 =

Executive car produced from November 1975 to January 1986

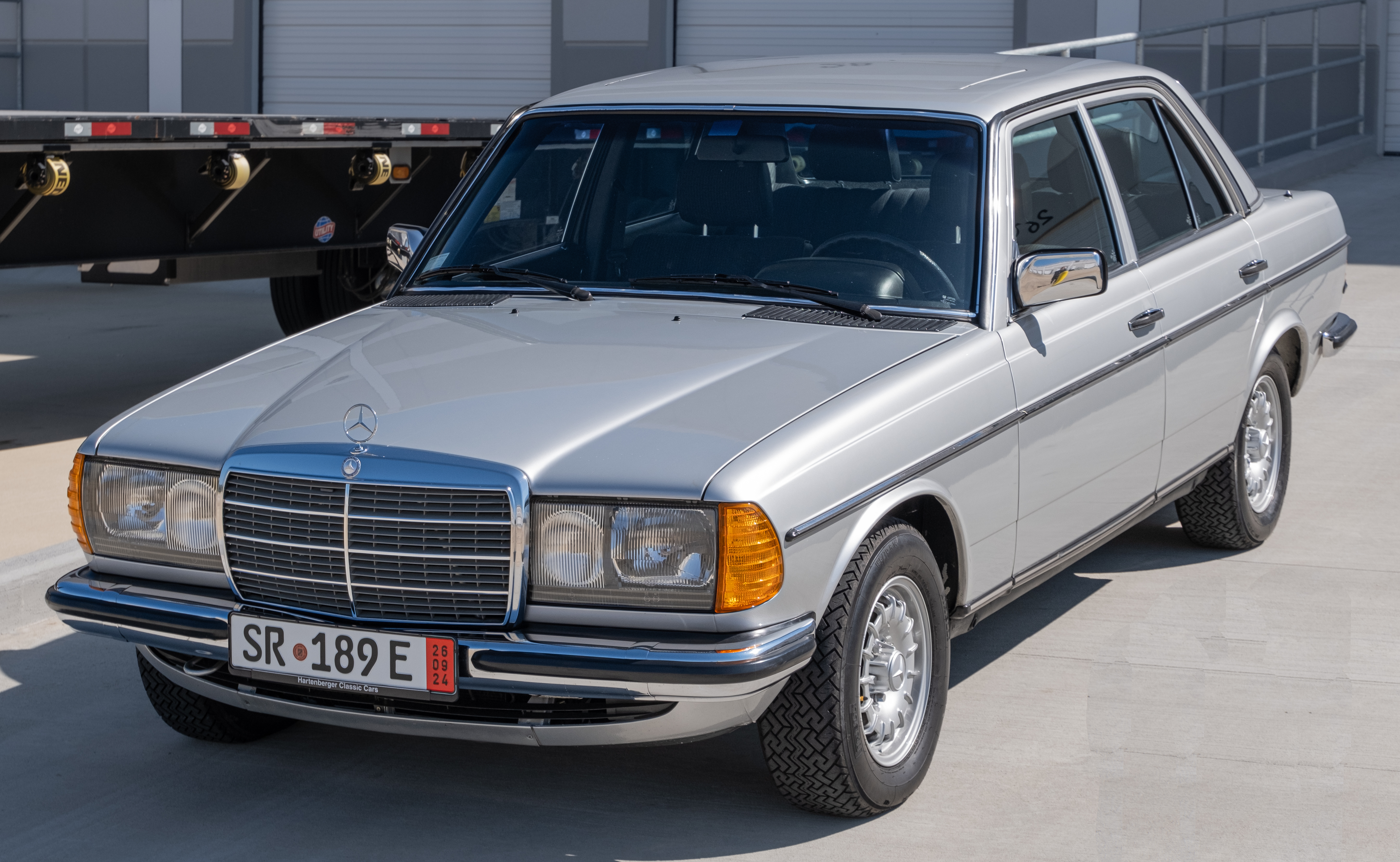
- 1984 Mercedes-Benz 280 E (W123)

Overview
- Manufacturer: Daimler-Benz
- Production: November 1975 – January 1986; 2,696,915 built 4-door: 2,375,410; Coupé: 99,884; Estate: 199,517; Limousine: 13,700; Chassis: 1,353; LWB chassis: 7,020
- Model years: 1976–1986
- Assembly: West Germany: Sindelfingen; Stuttgart; Bremen; South Africa: East London (sedan only); China: Changchun (FAW: 1987–1988); Thailand: Samut Prakarn (TAAP: 1979–1986)
- Designer: Friedrich Geiger, Bruno Sacco (Saloon & coupe: 1973, T-Model: 1975)

Body and chassis
- Class: Executive car (E)
- Body style: 4-door saloon (W123); 2-door coupé (C123); 5-door estate (S123); 4-door limousine (V123)
- Layout: FR layout
- Related: Mercedes-Benz E-Class

Powertrain
- Engine: petrol: 2.0 L M115 V20 I4; 2.0 L M102 V20 I4; 2.3 L M115 V23 I4; 2.3 L M102 E23 I4; 2.5 L M123 I6; 2.7 L M110 I6; diesel: 2.0 L OM615 D20 I4; 2.2 L OM615 D22 I4; 2.4 L OM616 I4; 3.0 L OM617 I5; 3.0 L OM617 A turbo I5
- Transmission: 4-speed 722.1 automatic 4-speed 4G-TRONIC automatic 4-speed manual 5-speed manual

Dimensions
- Wheelbase: Saloon: 2,795 mm (110.0 in); Coupé: 2,710 mm (106.7 in); Limousine/ambulance/hearse: 3,425 mm (134.8 in)
- Length: 4,725 mm (186.0 in); 4,849 mm (190.9 in) (US bumpers); 4,640 mm (183 in) (Coupé); 4,763 mm (187.5 in) (Coupé US bumpers); 5,355 mm (210.8 in) (Limousine)
- Width: Saloon: 1,784 mm (70.2 in)
- Height: Saloon: 1,435 mm (56.5 in)
- Curb weight: 1,390–1,650 kg (3,064.4–3,637.6 lb)

Chronology
- Predecessor: Mercedes-Benz W114
- Successor: Mercedes-Benz W124

The Mercedes-Benz W123 is a range of executive cars produced by West German manufacturer Mercedes-Benz from November 1975 to January 1986. The W123 models surpassed their predecessor, the Mercedes-Benz W114, as the most successful Mercedes-Benz, selling 2.7 million units before production ended in the autumn of 1985 for the saloon/sedan versions and January 1986 for coupés and estates/station wagons.

Following a slow production build-up during the first year, customers who placed their orders faced a lengthy waiting period of nine to twelve months. A black market emerged for the customers who were willing to pay more for immediate delivery. The slightly used W123 commanded about 5,000 Deutsche Mark premium over its original sale price.

Like its predecessors, the W123 gained the reputation of being well built and reliable. Many taxi companies in Germany chose the W123 due to its reputation of durability and reliability. Reaching 500,000 or more kilometres with only minor mechanical issues was common with W123 used as taxicabs. Once the W123 reached the end of its service life, they were often shipped to Africa and third world countries where they were highly esteemed for their ability to travel on rough roads and to require infrequent maintenance.

W123 production ended in January 1986 with 63 final estates/station wagons rolling out. The most popular single models were the 240 D (455,000 built), the 230 E (442,000 built), and the 200 D (378,000 built).

== Design ==
The W123 shares technical similarities with its predecessors, including the engines, steering system, and suspension system. The design is updated with styling cues from its larger sibling, Mercedes-Benz W116, namely wider ribbed taillights, horizontal headlamps, front turn signal indicators on the outer edge, and pull-to-open door handles.

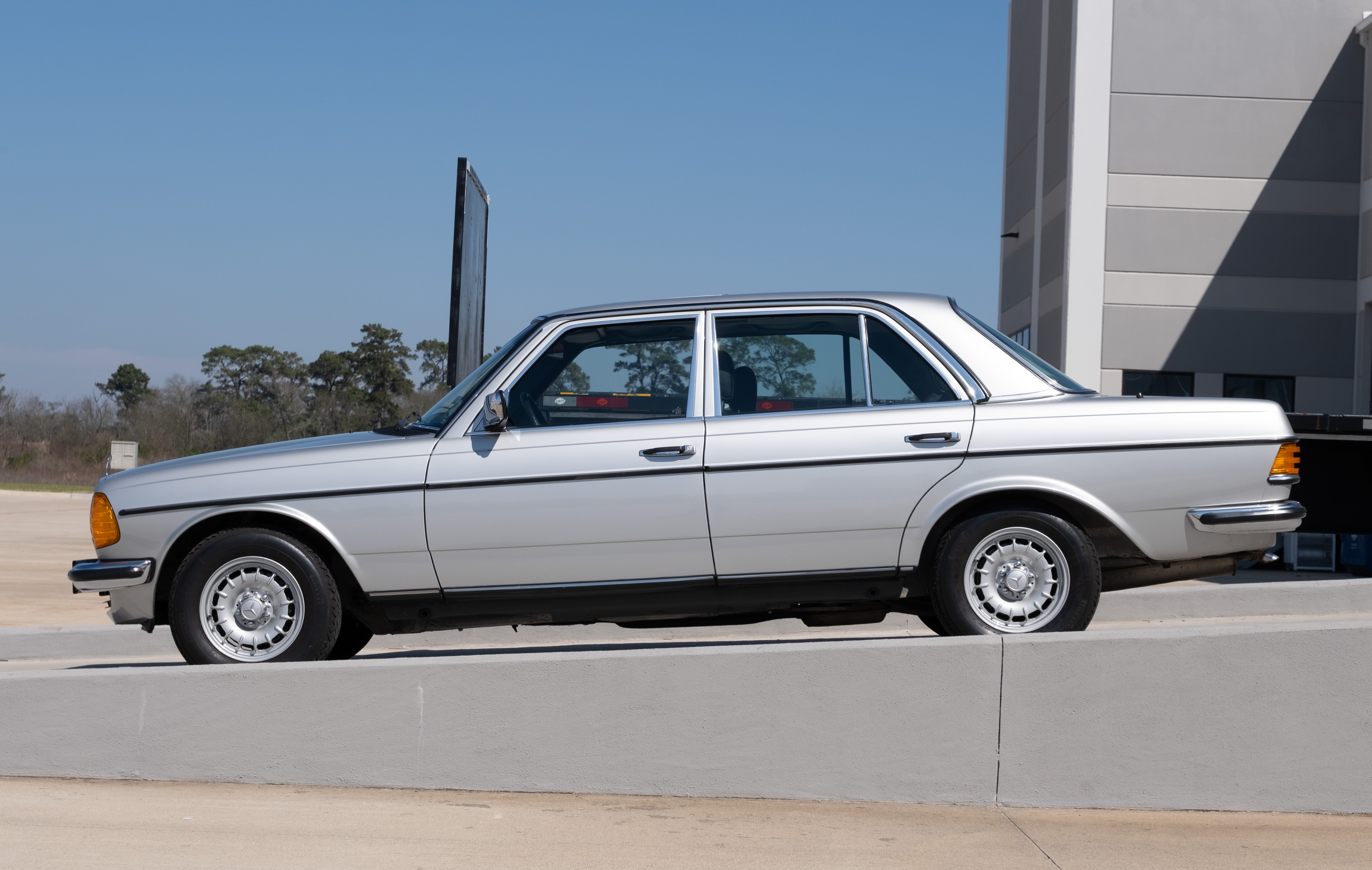
The W123 had a "slight wedge shape" from the side aspect, according to chief engineer Hans Scherenberg.

Friedrich Geiger was head of the styling department at the time the W123 design was finalized in 1973. Design goals according to chief engineer Hans Scherenberg included creating a "balanced, dynamic, non-aggressive form – one that lends these vehicles a special character – by emphasizing horizontal lines both at the front and rear, suggesting a slight wedge shape from the side aspect, reducing the use of chrome trim and, in the truest sense of the term, introducing rounded lines,” Scherenberg said. "We are as unimpressed by revolutionary leaps of style as by fashionable gimmicks."

The interior is revised with a larger instrument panel, central round ventilation outlets, HVAC control panel and a single row of control switches in the centre. The instrument panel has three large gauges placed behind a single plastic cover. The manual HVAC control panel has three large dials with the left and right for individual temperature control and the centre dial for fan speed control. Air flow is controlled by two sliders (left for upper zone and right for lower zone). If the optional air conditioning unit was ordered, a temperature roll dial was fitted to the row of control switches. The automatic HVAC control panel is simplified with a single roll disc on the left for temperature control, a row of push buttons in the middle for directing the air flow and switching the system on and off and a vertical set of buttons on the right for controlling the fan speed and switching automatic control on and off.

Initially, all models except the 280, 280 E, and coupé featured larger round headlamps with smaller round fog lamps with large glass plate covering the entire headlamp housing and acting as a diffusing lens. This design is the same for North American models with the sealed beam units and glass plate partially covering the headlamp housing. The 280, 280 E, and coupé models use large rectangular headlamps with round fog lamps. From 1983 onward, all models except for the aforementioned North American models featured the rectangular headlamps. The headlamp washers and wipers set are optional.

== Nomenclatures ==
Per Mercedes-Benz tradition (prior to the 1993 rebranding), model designation corresponded to the engine displacement, chassis type (coupé or estate/station wagon), fuel type (for diesel engines only), and availability of fuel injection system for petrol engines:

- W for Wagen (Sedan)
- C for Coupé
- T for Tourismus und Transport (estate/station wagon)

No designation was given for the long-wheelbase: it was simply called "Lang" (long) in the brochures and order forms.

- D for Diesel
- E for Einspritzung (fuel injection)

When the diesel engine is turbocharged, an emblem that reads "TURBODIESEL" is affixed to the right side of the boot lid.

As for the chassis codes, W123 is the sedan, S123 the estate, C123 the coupé, V123 the long-wheelbase sedan a.k.a. Lang, and F123 refers to the bare long-wheelbase chassis as used for ambulances and other conversions.

== Model variations ==
=== Saloon (W123) ===
The four-door version went on sale on 29 January 1976.

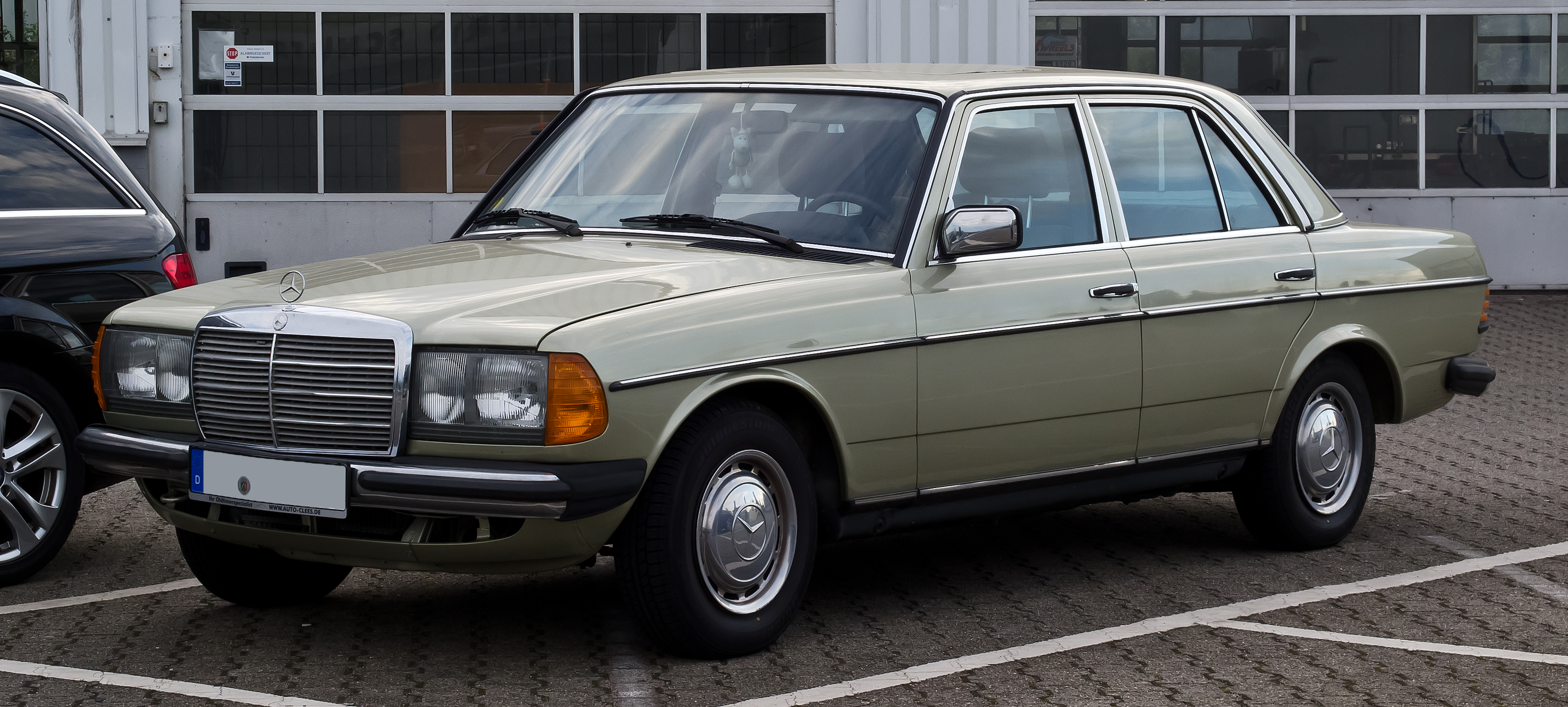
Mercedes-Benz 240D (W123) saloon (Euro-spec)

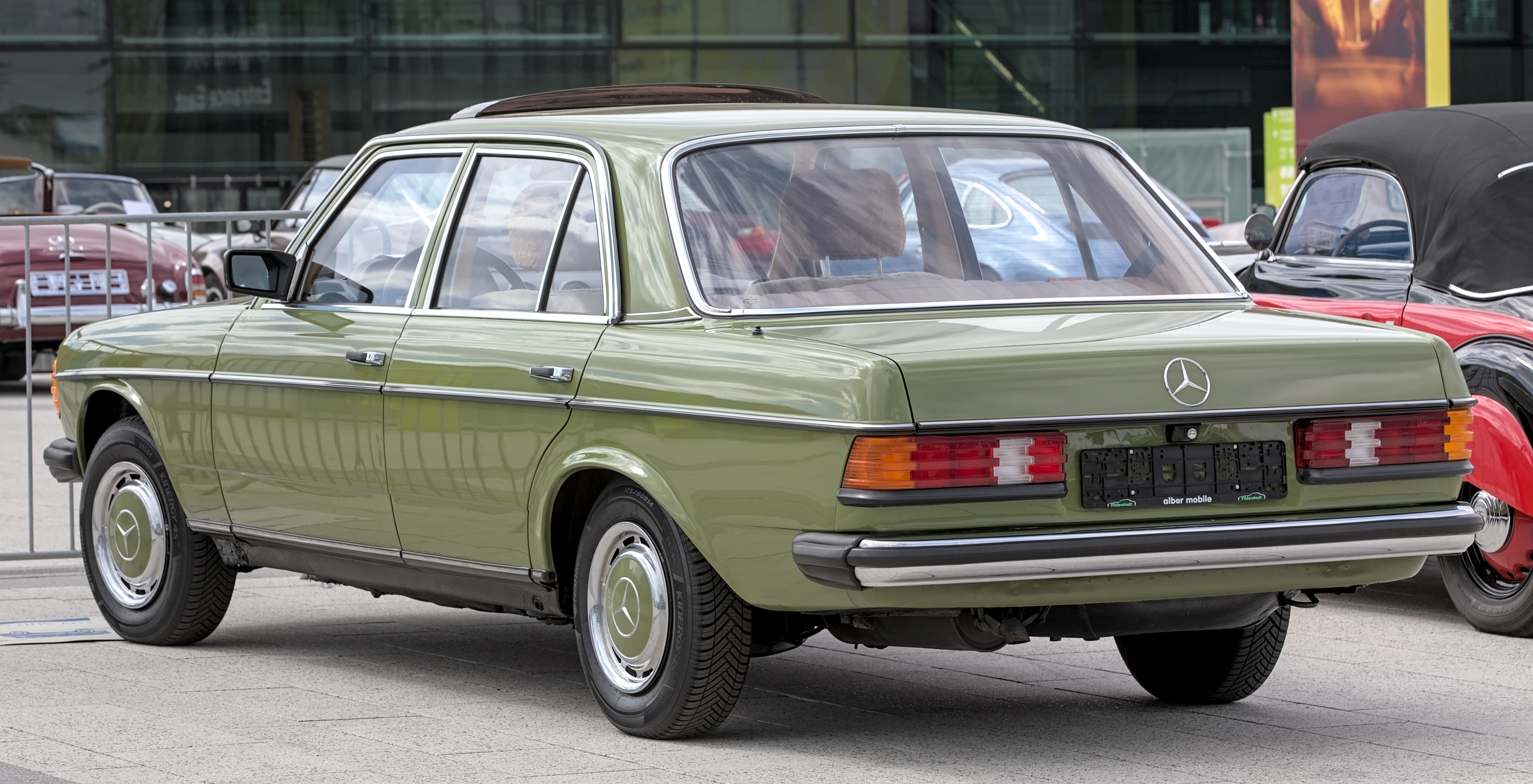
Mercedes-Benz 200 (W123) saloon rear

=== Coupé (C123) ===
In the spring of 1977, a coupé version was introduced on a shortened wheelbase (2,710 mm (106.7 in) versus 2,795 mm (110.0 in) for the saloon). The C123 was available as 230 C (later 230 CE), as 280 C and 280 CE in most markets, and as the 300 CD/300 CD Turbodiesel for the US market. Unlike the W123 saloon, the rectangular headlamps were fitted to the C123 regardless of engine type.

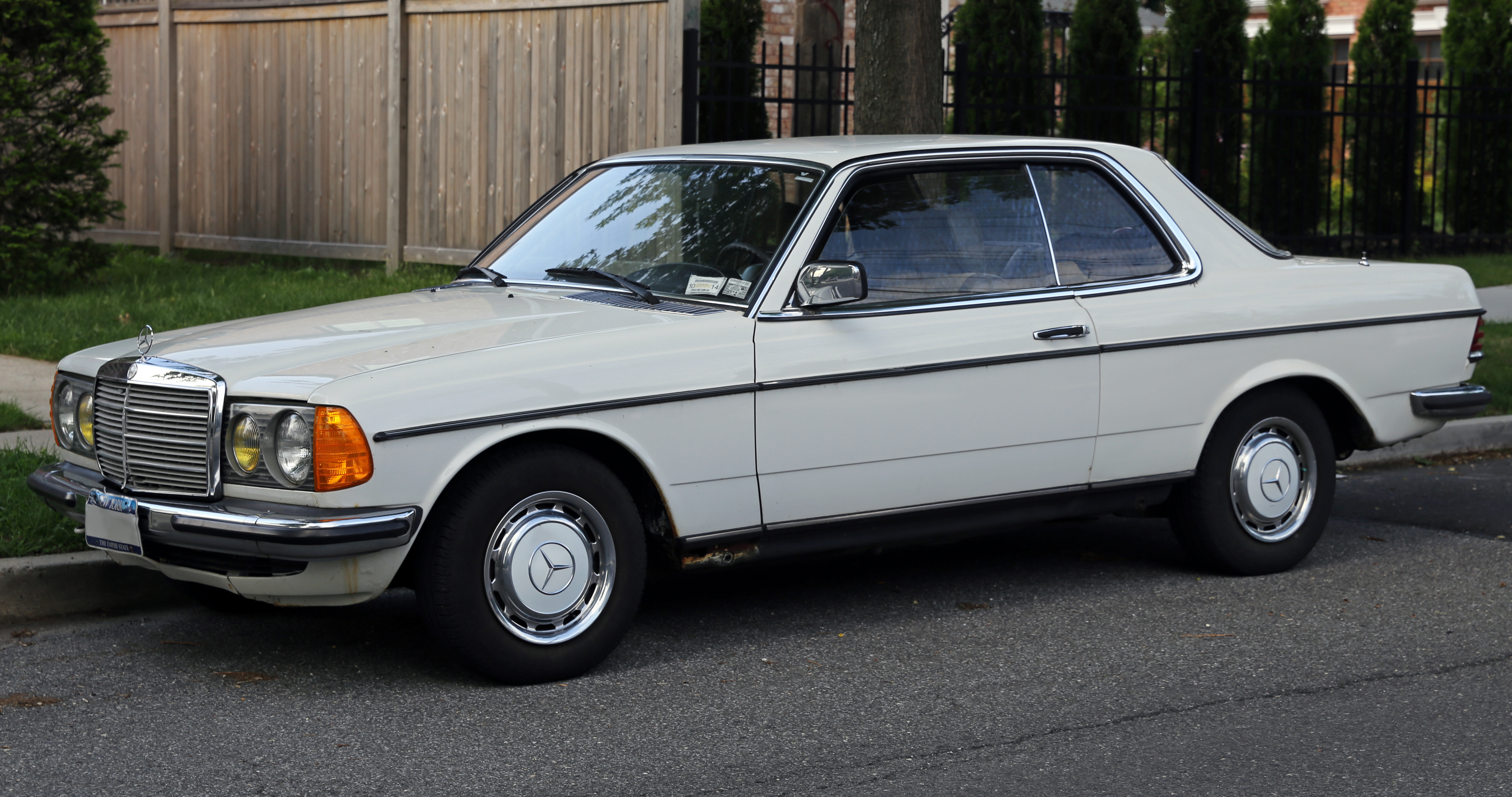
1977 Mercedes-Benz 230 C (front)

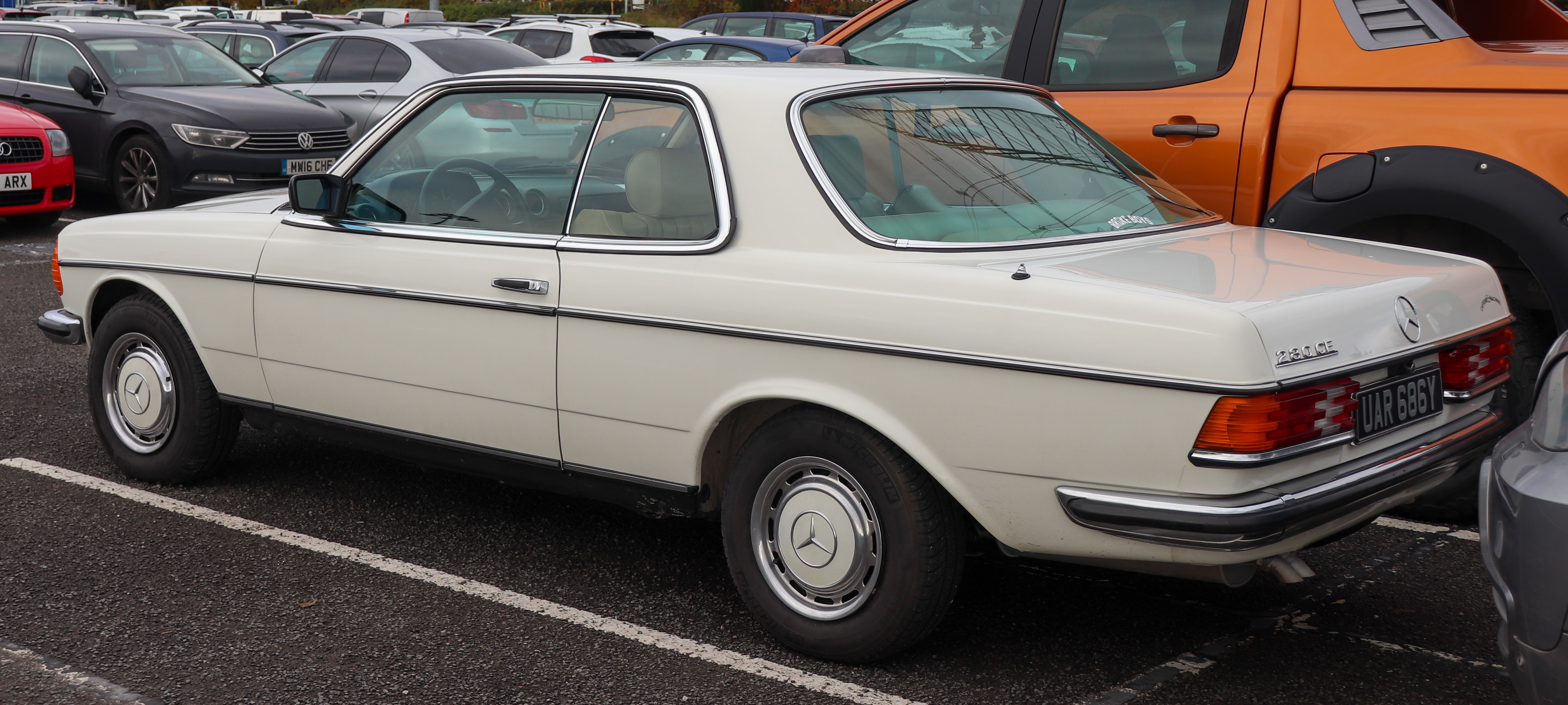
1983 Mercedes-Benz 280 CE (rear)

=== Limousine (V123) ===
From August 1976, a long-wheelbase version, extended to 3,425 mm (134.8 in), with seating for seven to eight was produced. The limousine was built on a stretched W123 saloon/sedan chassis with additional lower side panels behind the rear passenger doors. The elongated roof has the same C-pillar form as on the saloon/sedan. The rear passenger doors were custom-designed in rectangular shape and of the same length as the ones on the saloon/sedan. The engine options were 250, 240 D, and 300 D. A few 280 E limousines were built as special orders.

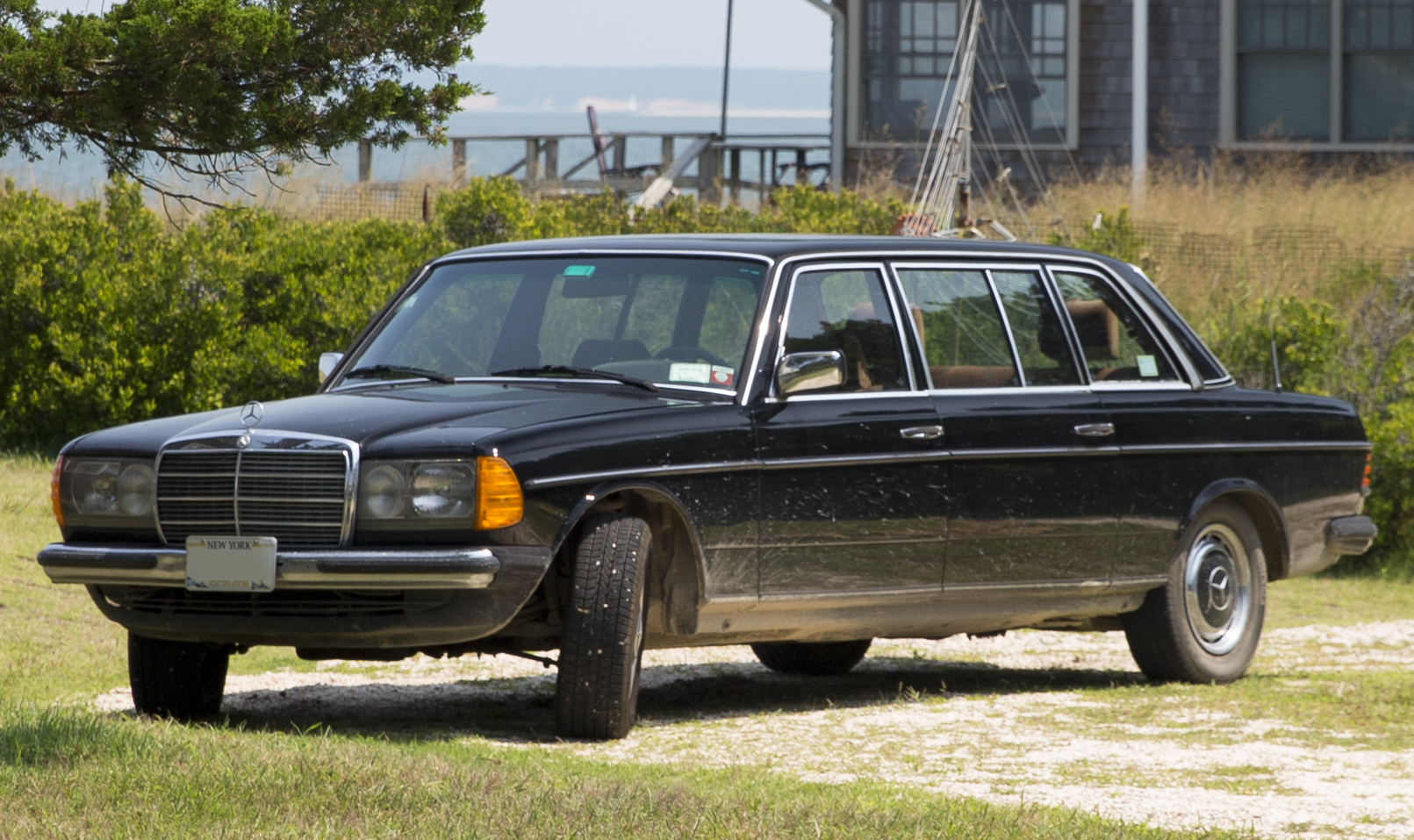
Mercedes-Benz V123 "Lang" (long wheelbase)

=== Chassis (F123) ===
The stretched limousine version was offered with complete front body clip (B-pillar forward) and strengthened chassis as the base for ambulances or hearses to be built by the conversion specialists such as Binz and Miesen. F stands for Fahrgestelle (chassis).

=== Estate (S123) ===
At the 1977 IAA in Frankfurt, the brand's first-ever factory-built estate, S123, was introduced. The letter T in the model designation stood for Tourismus und Transport (Touring and Transport). Previous estates had been custom-built by the coachbuilders, namely Binz. S123 production began in April 1978 at Mercedes-Benz Bremen factory. All engines except the 2-litre version of the M115 (petrol) and OM615 (diesel) were available in the range. When the M115 was replaced with the new M102 engine, a petrol-engined 200 T also joined the range.

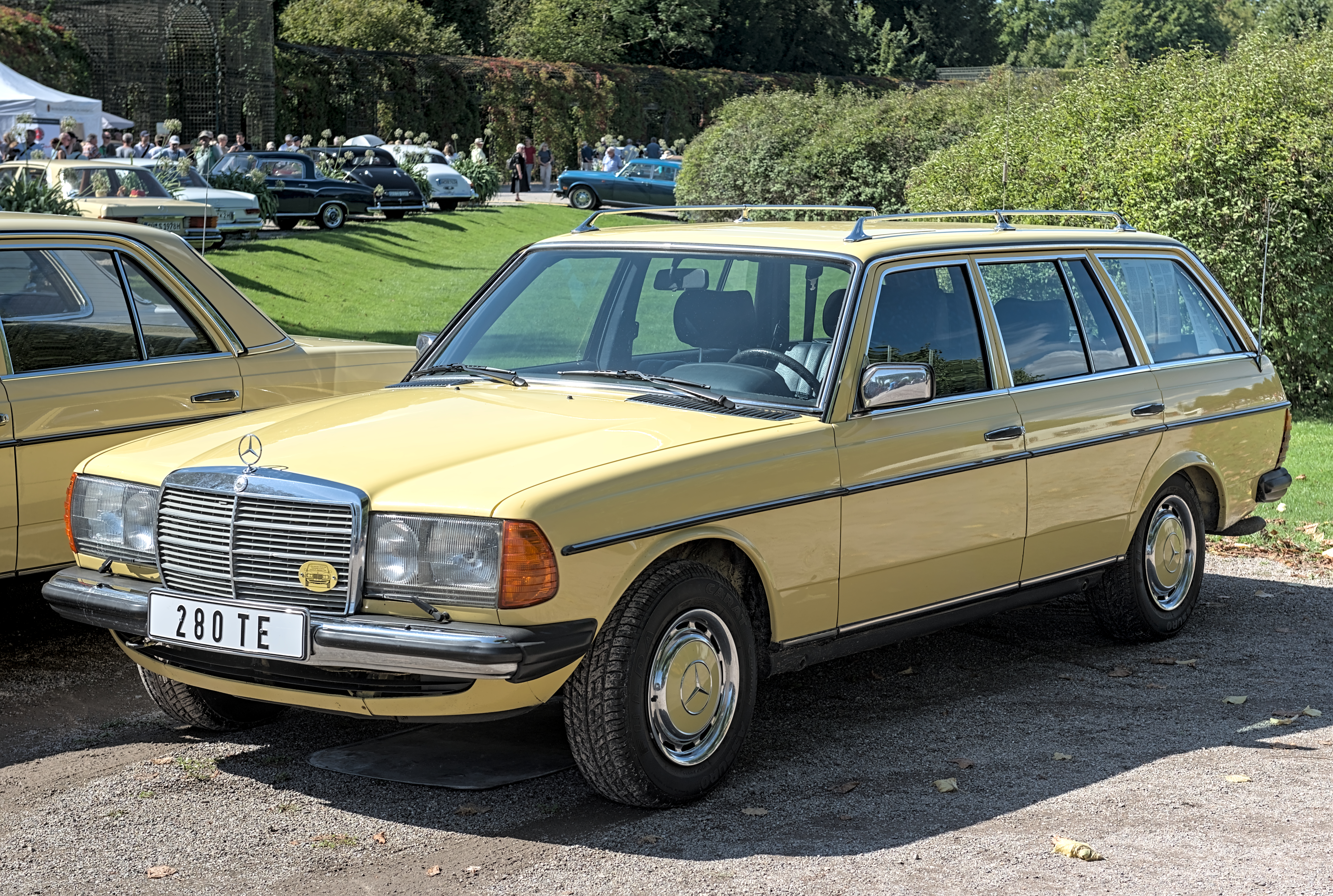
Mercedes-Benz 280 TE (estate)

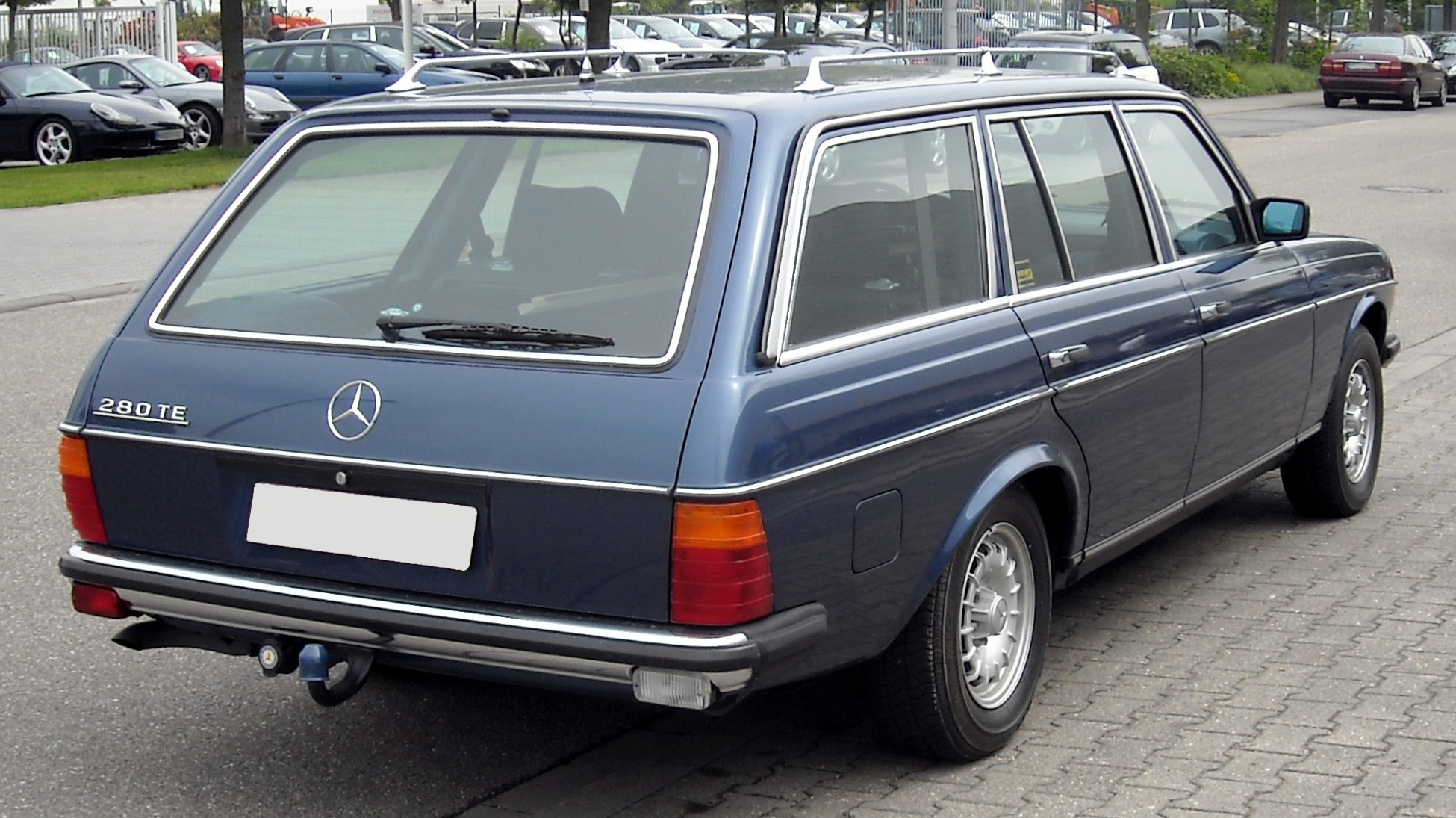
Mercedes-Benz 280 TE (estate) rear view

=== Convertible ===
While Mercedes-Benz never built its own convertible, some, based on the C123 coupé, were built by external companies including Crayford in the UK which (using the folding soft-top assemblies from 1973 Ford Mustangs salvaged from wrecking yards, the dimensions of the mechanism being ideal) built the "St. Tropez" and Niko-Michaels in New York, USA. In the city of Hagen, Germany, until 2016, the small, family owned Bähr built C123 cabriolets, and also sold kits for the conversion.

== Engines ==
All of the W115's engines were carried over, including the 2.0- and 2.3-litre M115 four-cylinder petrol units, the 2.0- and 2.2-litre OM615 and 2.4-litre OM616 four-cylinders and the 3.0-litre, five-cylinder OM617 diesel engines.

The W114 motors, however, received a makeover: the M180-powered 230.6 and M130-powered 250 were replaced by the new, single overhead-cam, 2.5-litre M123, with the car badged as 250.

This meant that for the domestic market the M115 four-cylinder model dropped the .4 suffix for redundancy, and the OM617 powered model would receive nomenclature matching the engine displacement: 300 D instead of 240 D 3.0. Such badging had already been used for the previous generation on North American export models.

The flagship DOHC M110-powered, 2.7-litre motor was also carried over, available both as the carbureted 280 and with K-Jetronic as the 280 E.

In the autumn of 1978, the power output of the 240 D was increased from 65 to 72 PS (48 to 53 kW; 64 to 71 hp) while the 280 E's power went from 177 to 185 PS (130 to 136 kW; 175 to 182 hp). In early 1979, the power output rose from 55 PS (40 kW; 54 hp) to 60 PS (44 kW; 59 hp) for the 200 D and from 80 PS (59 kW; 79 hp) to 88 PS (65 kW; 87 hp) for the 300 D. The 220 D was discontinued after 1979.

In June 1980, the new M102 four-cylinder petrol engine replaced the M115. The 2-litre version was only available with a carburettor while the 2.3-litre version was available with fuel injection only. The carbureted version of 2.8-litre M110 engine in the 280 and 280 C was discontinued in 1981, leaving the 250 as the sole carbureted six-cylinder engine.

The world's first turbocharged diesel engine for a passenger vehicle, the OM617 A, was finally introduced in W123 in September 1979 with 300 TD Turbodiesel that was initially exclusive for the European market. The same engine was offered in North America and Japan in 1981 as the 300 D Turbodiesel 300 CD Turbodiesel, and 300 TD Turbodiesel.

Some engines in the W123 were mounted with small shock absorbers in addition to industry standard motor mounts to reduce felt vibration and a provide a smoother ride. These designs were carried over from previous chassis models like the W114/W115.

== Motorsport ==
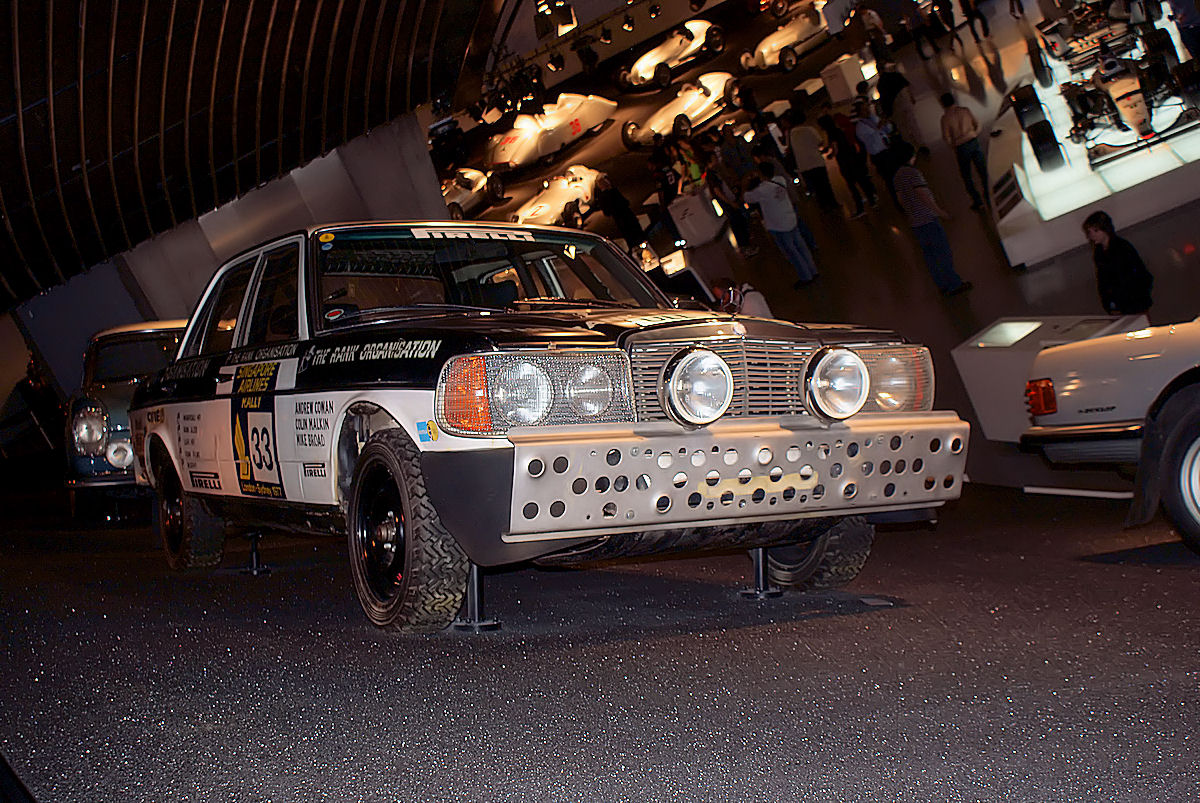
1977 280 E that won 1977 London–Sydney Marathon in MB Museum

One notable achievement was in the 28,200 km (17,500 mi) 1977 London–Sydney Marathon rally, where the 280 E won first and second, ahead of the third and fourth place Citroën CX.

== North American sales ==
North American sales began with the W123 sedan for the 1977 model year. The initial range consisted of the 230, 240 D, 300 D, and 280 E models. Compliance with stringent Environmental Protection Agency (EPA) automotive emission control regulations on performance and US Department of Transportation on passenger safety required extensive changes to the vehicles, that made them significantly different from those sold in Europe. When the S123 estate/station wagon was introduced in the US in 1979, the engine choice was limited to 3-litre OM 617 diesel engine. No 240 TD or 280 TE were offered.

Externally the changes were most noticeable with massive 5-mph front and rear bumpers and sealed-beam headlights. This particularly affected the 280/280 E models, whose European counterparts received elegant wrap-around chrome bumper tips and square halogen headlights, which were unavailable to US customers. Journalists reported that "the visual changes were on the mild side" compared to US version of the Mercedes-Benz R107 and Mercedes-Benz W116, which have been described as if a "beautiful car was beaten with the malaise ugly stick."

The W123 production coincided with the introduction of federal regulations on corporate average fuel economy (CAFE) and the amendments with the Clean Air Act, which mandated catalytic converters, lower compression ratios and exhaust gas recirculation. All of these measures affected the equivalent weight and performance of the imported cars. For example, the European 280 E had a 1460 kg curb weight and its engine had a DIN rating of 185 PS (136 kW; 182 hp) at 5800 rpm and 240 N⋅m (177 lb⋅ft) at 4500 rpm. The corresponding North American car ranged between 137 and 142 hp (102 and 106 kW; 139 and 144 PS) depending on the model year and state (California received different specifications for 1977 and 1978) while weighing at least 100 kg (220 lb) more than its European counterpart.

As the regulations were less stringent on diesel engines, Mercedes-Benz saw this as a way to circumvent the restrictions. In 1981, the turbocharged diesel engine became the sole engine choice for 300 D, 300 CD, and 300 TD. The 300 CD and later 300 CD Turbodiesel were exclusive to the US market and not offered elsewhere, including Europe where the taxation is favourable for the diesel fuel.

The performance improvement of turbocharged diesel engine led to the elimination of 280 E and 280 CE for 1982. The American customers appreciated the better performance of the 300 TD Turbodiesel as they found the naturally aspirated version too slow and underpowered for extra weight. The 240 D was discontinued for the 1984 model year as the new W201 190 E and 190 D took the position of the lowest-priced Mercedes-Benz. Until the 1986 introduction of W124, the W123 model range had a single engine option: 3-litre OM 617 turbocharged diesel engine.

Most of the American models came with the W4B 025 four-speed automatic and only the 240 D was also offered with the 4-speed manual transmission. The new 5-speed manual gearboxes were never offered for the North American market.

Notable exterior differences included

- Larger and stronger bumpers that resist collision damage up to 5 mph
- Round sealed beam headlamp capsules and fog lamps; the large glass covers partially the housing. The fog lamps had clear lens until 1980 model year when they were tinted yellow due to the confusion between fog lamps and high beam headlamps.
- Amber-coloured retroreflective markers on the front turn signal indicators which double as night illumination
- Red-coloured retroreflective markers at side edge of taillamps
- Location of ID-tag on A-pillar
- Emission control device for petrol engines only
- Radio with different frequency steps when tuning to different radio stations
- 85 mph maximum speedometer with 55 mph prominently marked
- Tinted glass band across the top of front windscreen
- If passenger side external rear view mirror is included, the mirror must carry the warning: "Vehicles are closer than they appear"
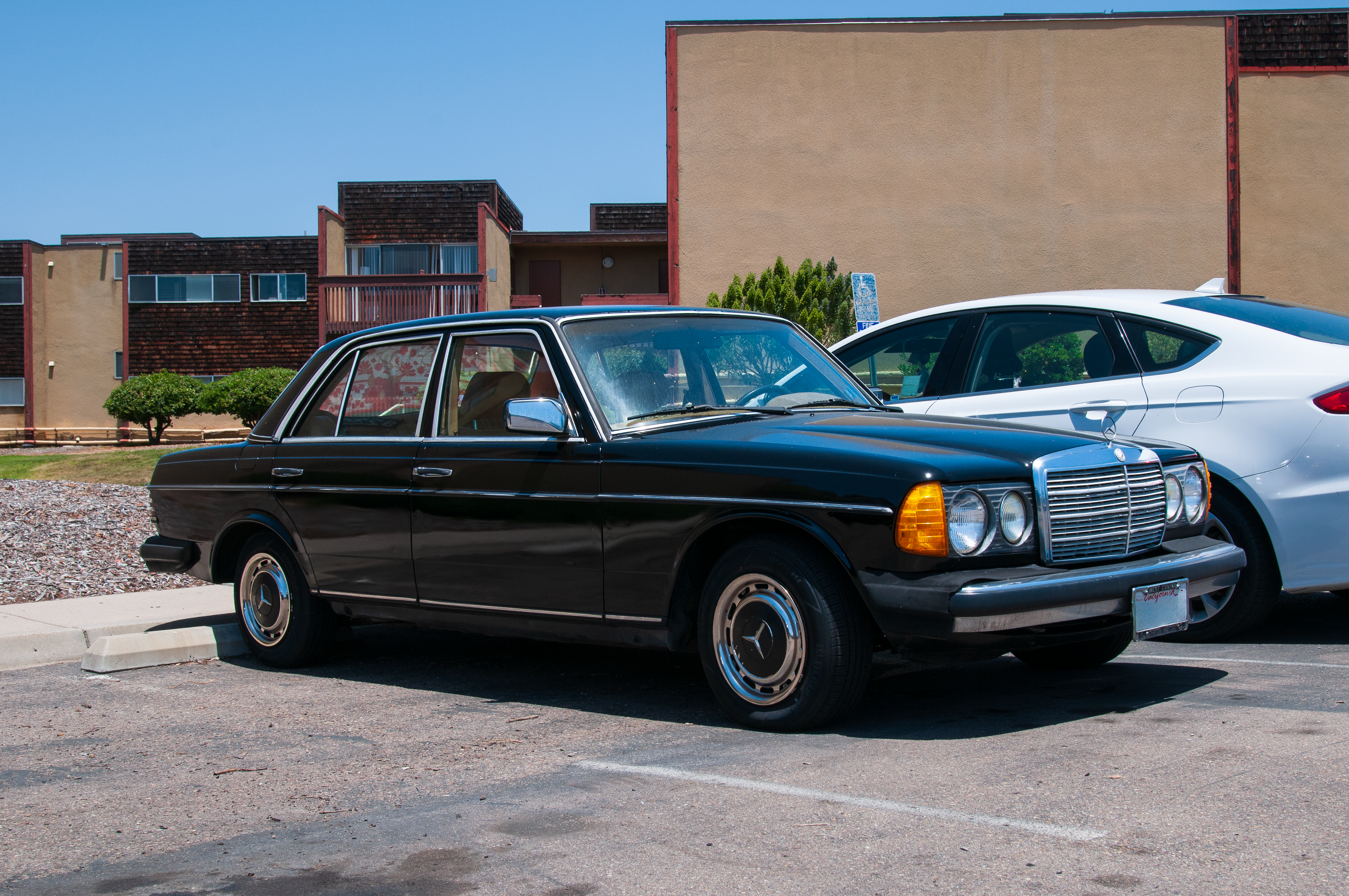
Mercedes-Benz 300D Turbo Diesel Sedan

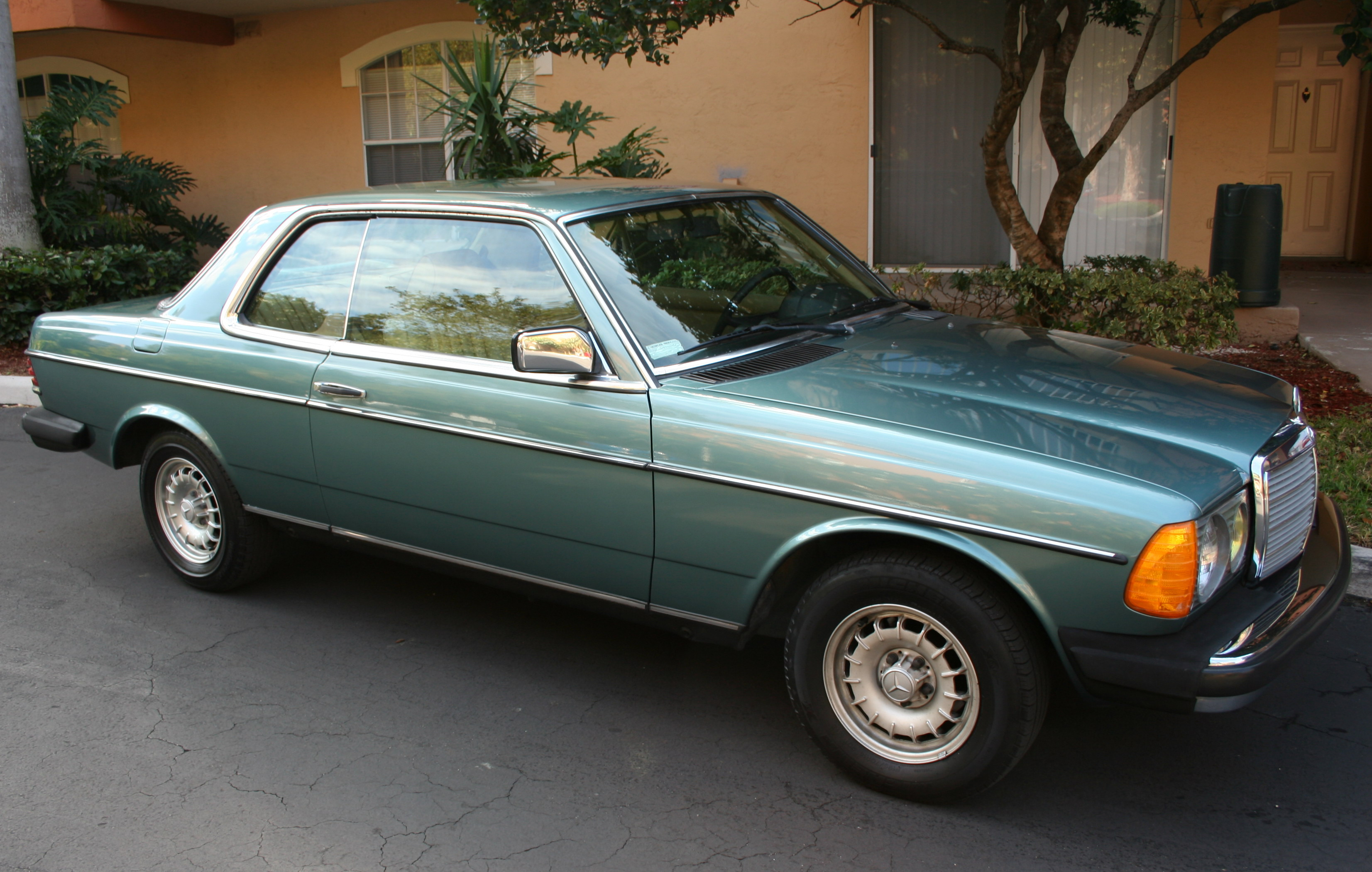
Mercedes-Benz 300CD Turbodiesel coupé (US-version)

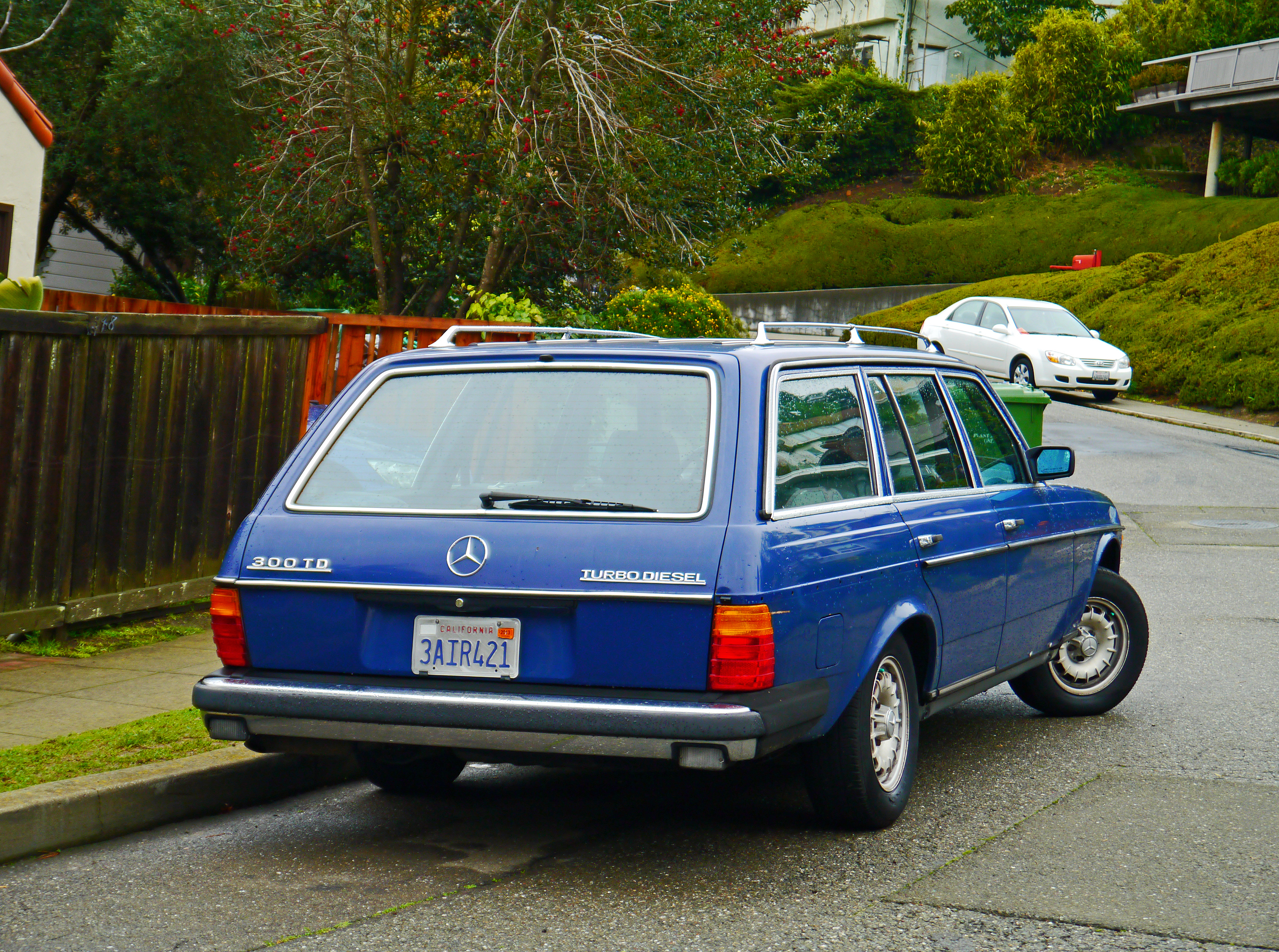
1985 Mercedes-Benz 300TD Turbodiesel estate

== Equipment and features ==
The standard and optional features are numerous along with a large number of engine and gearbox options. Customers could choose cloth, MB-Tex vinyl, velour or leather for the upholstery as well as interior wood trim for dashboard and centre console. The paint and interior colour palettes are extensive as well.

The driving dynamic enhancement options for extra cost became more extensive over the time: ABS (from August 1980 onward), self-locking differential gear, five-speed manual gearbox (introduced in 1982 for European markets only), Tempomat cruise control system, power steering system (standard from 1982 onward), passenger-side external rear view mirror (standard on S123 model), "Alpine" horn with selectable loudness (popular in Switzerland due to strict noise regulations), retractable steering column (from 1982 onward) and so forth.

The extra-cost options for creature comforts include power windows (with a cut-off switch for the rear passenger door windows), vacuum-powered central locking system, sunroof (manual and electric), air conditioning system (manual or automatic control), seats with orthopaedic support, electrically heated seats (all seats were individually ordered), pre-heating system (for heating the passenger compartment at a pre-selected time when the engine is not running), an assortment of different radios with and without cassette players, rear seat head rests, etc. The W123s destined for the North American market tended to have more features as standard, reflecting the American customer's preference for luxury accessories. For the first time in an executive saloon from Mercedes-Benz, the W123 had the option of fully automatic climate control at extra cost. This option was popular in the North American and Japanese markets. A rare option was a column gear selector that could be ordered with an automatic gearbox if the customer wished. The most expensive option was the Becker radio telephone, selling for 13,512 Deutsche Mark.

In the estate/station wagon model, a third row rear-facing foldable seat was offered as an extra cost option.

== Critical appraisal ==
In the United States contemporary reception to the W123 by the motoring press was generally positive. The car was praised for its technical sophistication, safety innovation, and performance as well as its thorough engineering and high build quality. Downsides were typically limited to complaints about the car's high price or the relative austerity of its equipment (manually adjustable seats, for example) compared with contemporary American vehicles at the time.

The W123 won Motor Trend's Import Car of the Year in 1977, with the authors noting that the car was selected based on its overall balance of attributes, rather than dominance in any one specific area. Reviewers noted the accurate steering and "a beautiful balance between comfort and control" in the test vehicle, a US-specification 280 E. Also noted was the seamless integration of safety features such as a diagonally-bending steering column and 25% larger mirrors compared with the previous model. Although the price of $16,000 was "a fair amount in most people's minds," the car was said to represent good value for money in its segment.

A March 1977 Car and Driver review described the 142 hp engine powering its test car as delivering "solid by not stupefying performance." Poise at higher speeds was noted, with performance described as "quiet, stable, comfortable, and efficient in a fashion that most car owners simply cannot comprehend," though substantial body roll was noted. Writing in the same article, automotive journalist David E. Davis Jr. noted that "The Mercedes almost seems to dramatize the fact that it is a machine--a pleasant, comfort machine, but a machine nonetheless--not a boudoir, not some mobile extension of your living room, but a mechanical device." A counterpoint segment complained of the car's relatively high cabin noise, but admired "Mercedes-Benz for having the courage of its convictions," in designing a car that is "purposeful, solidly built, and direct in its responses."

== Updates ==
Mercedes-Benz updated the W123 in incremental steps, calling them series:

- Series 0.5, November 1975 – July 1976
- First Series, August 1976 – July 1979
- Second Series, August 1979 – August 1982
- Third Series, September 1982 – January 1986

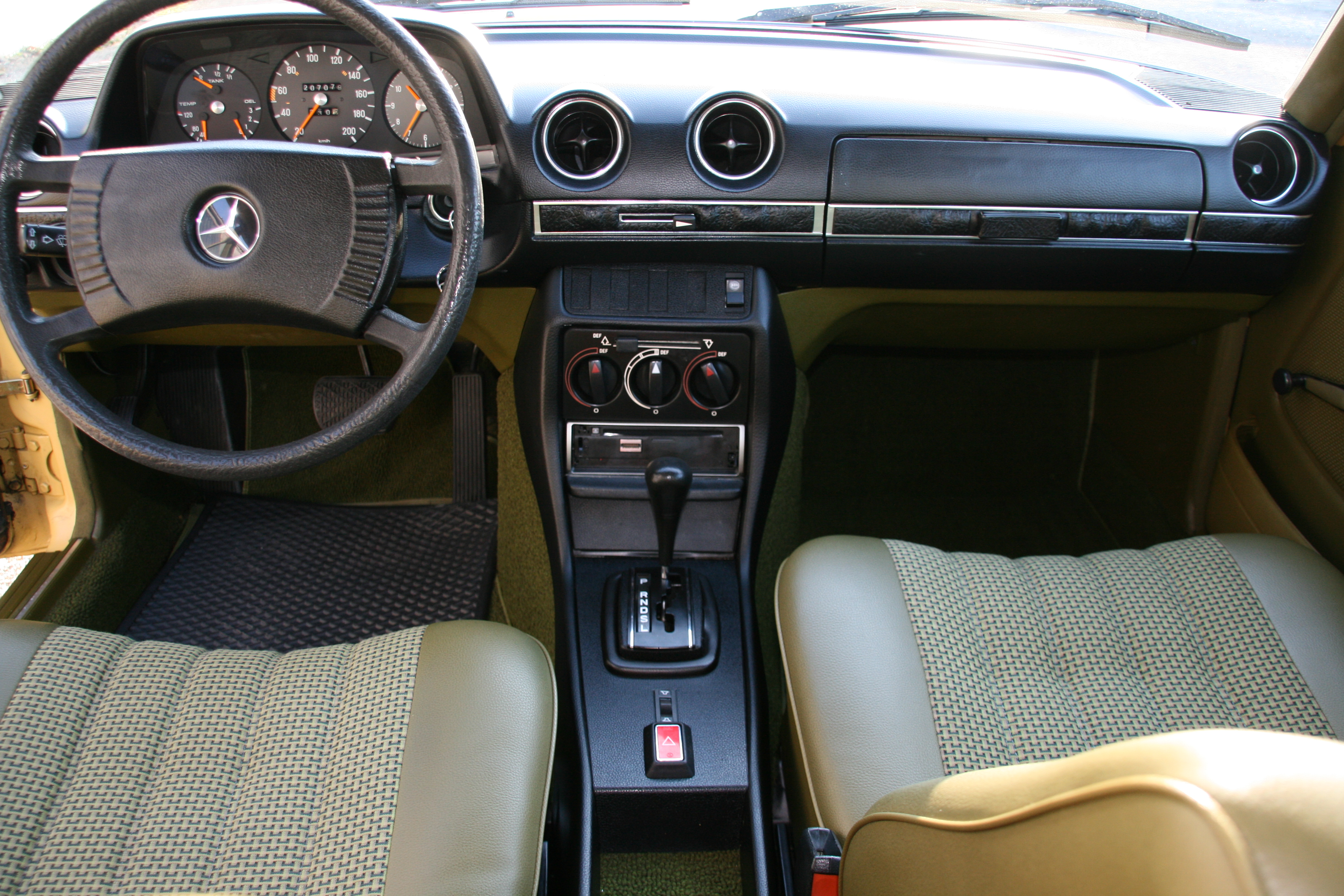
1977 Mercedes-Benz 230 interior

Changes to the second series (from August 1979):

- smaller steering wheel (10 mm) in a more elegant design
- modernized toggle switches with smoother edges (hazard lights, windows, etc.)
- pneumatic headlamp leveling system
- modified belt buckles and smaller headrests
- new fabric patterns for the seats

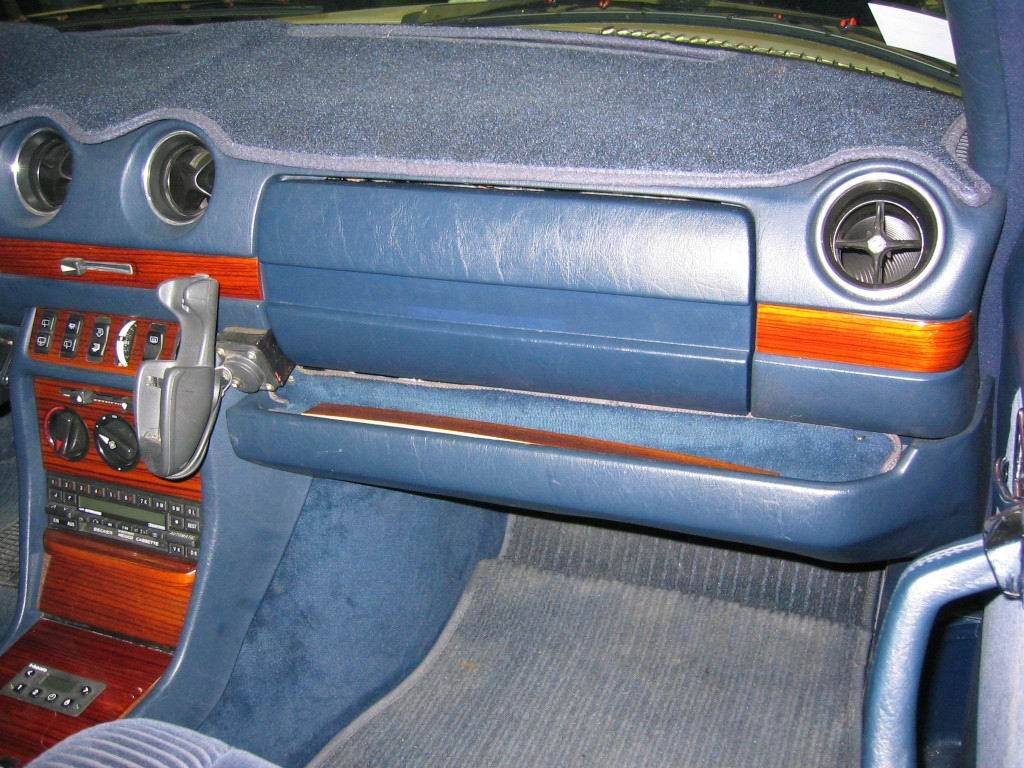
Mercedes-Benz W123 with passenger airbag

Changes to the third series (from September 1982):

- Rectangular headlights and power steering as standard for entire model range
- Molded front seat backrests for more knee freedom in the rear
- Cloth insert in the door panels
- Zebrano wood paneling in the dashboard
- Reduced wind noise due to improved roof trim strips
- Ventilation outlets are no longer chrome-plated
- Driver's airbag available as optional equipment

For the 1981 model year, the automatic climate control panel from the W126 S-Class with a simplified icon design was adopted. A new five-speed manual gearbox was introduced in February 1982 and was available in all models except those with the 3-litre turbocharged diesel engine but not in North America. This gearbox was only offered to North America via the grey market.

In September 1982, the driver's airbag with seat belt pre-tensioners for the passenger were offered as a 1,762.80 Deutsche Mark option for all models from the 1983 model year onward. Very few W123s had both driver and passenger air bags. The passenger air bag used a pyrotechnic gas discharge design, a world's first.

=== Copies ===
The W123 was officially produced by FAW in China from 1987 until 1988, as a 200 or as a long-wheelbase 230 E. Only 828 cars were built in their Changchun plant. Another Chinese company called Bamin Automobile manufactured W123 lookalikes using other parts. Bamin was a People's Liberation Army-owned company located in Minhou. Their W123 copy was built on the chassis of the Bamin BM212A/213A, a copy of the Beijing BJ212 and came in a few different bodystyles. There was a four-door pickup called the BM2022A (or the better equipped BM1020KHA) and a wagon derived from it, as well as the BM1020KH/BM6480 (proper station wagons). The Chinese copies used the 2.4-litre BJ492 pushrod inline-four engine from the BJ212.

== Technical data ==
Petrol Engines
Model	Chassis	Years	Configuration	Displ.	Fuel Delivery	Power	Torque	Empty Weight	0–100 km/h (0–62 mph)	Top Speed	Fuel Consumption	Units
200	123.020	2/76–8/80	M115 V 20 (115.938); I4	1988 cc	Stromberg 175 CDTU Carburettor	94 PS (69 kW; 93 hp) at 4,800 rpm	158 N⋅m (117 lb⋅ft) at 3,000 rpm	1,340 kg (2,950 lb)	15.2 s	160 km/h (99 mph)	12.3 L/100 km (19.1 mpg_{‑US})	158,772
200	123.220	9/80–11/85	M102 V 20 (102.920); I4	1997 cc	Stromberg 175 CDT Carburettor	109 PS (80 kW; 108 hp) at 5,200 rpm	170 N⋅m (125 lb⋅ft) at 3,000 rpm	1,350 kg (2,980 lb)	14.4 s	168 km/h (104 mph)	10.2 L/100 km (23 mpg_{‑US})	217,315
200 T	123.280	11/80–1/86	M102 V 20 (102.920); I4	1997 cc	Stromberg 175 CDT Carburettor	109 PS (80 kW; 108 hp) at 5,200 rpm	170 N⋅m (125 lb⋅ft) at 3,000 rpm	1,470 kg (3,240 lb)	15.3 s	168 km/h (104 mph)	10.4 L/100 km (23 mpg_{‑US})	18,860
230	123.023	2/76–8/80	M115 V 23 (115.954); I4	2307 cc	Stromberg 175 CDTU Carburettor	109 PS (80 kW; 108 hp) at 4,800 rpm	186 N⋅m (137 lb⋅ft) at 2,500 rpm	1,350 kg (2,980 lb)	13.7 s	170 km/h (106 mph)	12.2 L/100 km (19.3 mpg_{‑US})	196,185
230 C	123.083	6/77–8/80	M115 V 23 (115.954); I4	2307 cc	Stromberg 175 CDTU Carburettor	109 PS (80 kW; 108 hp) at 4,800 rpm	186 N⋅m (137 lb⋅ft) at 2,500 rpm	1,375 kg (3,031 lb)	13.7 s	170 km/h (106 mph)	12.1 L/100 km (19.4 mpg_{‑US})	18,675
230 T	123.043	5/78–4/80	M115 V 23 (115.954); I4	2307 cc	Stromberg 175 CDTU Carburettor	109 PS (80 kW; 108 hp) at 4,800 rpm	186 N⋅m (137 lb⋅ft) at 2,500 rpm	1,470 kg (3,240 lb)	13.7 s	170 km/h (106 mph)	12.2 L/100 km (19.3 mpg_{‑US})	6,884
230 E	123.223	7/80–11/85	M102 E 23 (102.980); I4	2299 cc	Bosch K-Jetronic Fuel Injection	136 PS (100 kW; 134 hp) at 5,100 rpm	205 N⋅m (151 lb⋅ft) at 3,500 rpm	1,360 kg (3,000 lb)	11.5 s	180 km/h (112 mph)	10.4 L/100 km (23 mpg_{‑US})	245,876
230 CE	123.243	4/80–11/85	M102 E 23 (102.980); I4	2299 cc	Bosch K-Jetronic Fuel Injection	136 PS (100 kW; 134 hp) at 5,100 rpm	205 N⋅m (151 lb⋅ft) at 3,500 rpm	1,380 kg (3,040 lb)	11.5 s	180 km/h (112 mph)	10.4 L/100 km (23 mpg_{‑US})	29,858
230 TE	123.283	4/80–1/86	M102 E 23 (102.980); I4	2299 cc	Bosch K-Jetronic Fuel Injection	136 PS (100 kW; 134 hp) at 5,100 rpm	205 N⋅m (151 lb⋅ft) at 3,500 rpm	1,480 kg (3,260 lb)	12.2 s	180 km/h (112 mph)	10.5 L/100 km (22 mpg_{‑US})	42,248
250	123.026	4/76–8/79	M123 V 25 (123.920); I6	2525 cc	Solex 4A Carburettor	129 PS (95 kW; 127 hp) at 5,500 rpm	196 N⋅m (145 lb⋅ft) at 3,500 rpm	1,410 kg (3,110 lb)	11.3 s	185 km/h (115 mph)	12.8 L/100 km (18.4 mpg_{‑US})	117,684
250	123.026	9/79–9/81	M123 V 25 (123.921); I6	2525 cc	Solex 4A Carburettor	140 PS (103 kW; 138 hp) at 5,500 rpm	200 N⋅m (148 lb⋅ft) at 3,500 rpm	1,410 kg (3,110 lb)	11.3 s	185 km/h (115 mph)	12.8 L/100 km (18.4 mpg_{‑US})	117,684
250	123.026	10/81–12/85	M123 V 25 (123.921); I6	2525 cc	Solex 4A Carburettor	140 PS (103 kW; 138 hp) at 5,500 rpm	200 N⋅m (148 lb⋅ft) at 3,500 rpm	1,410 kg (3,110 lb)	11.7 s	185 km/h (115 mph)	12.8 L/100 km (18.4 mpg_{‑US})	117,684
250 T	123.086	5/78–8/79	M123 V 25 (123.920); I6	2525 cc	Solex 4A Carburettor	129 PS (95 kW; 127 hp) at 5,500 rpm	196 N⋅m (145 lb⋅ft) at 3,500 rpm	1,510 kg (3,330 lb)	11.9 s	185 km/h (115 mph)	12.8 L/100 km (18.4 mpg_{‑US})	7,704
250 T	123.086	9/79–9/81	M123 V 25 (123.921); I6	2525 cc	Solex 4A Carburettor	140 PS (103 kW; 138 hp) at 5,500 rpm	200 N⋅m (148 lb⋅ft) at 3,500 rpm	1,510 kg (3,330 lb)	11.9 s	185 km/h (115 mph)	12.8 L/100 km (18.4 mpg_{‑US})	7,704
250 T	123.086	10/81–10/82	M123 V 25 (123.921); I6	2525 cc	Solex 4A Carburettor	140 PS (103 kW; 138 hp) at 5,500 rpm	200 N⋅m (148 lb⋅ft) at 3,500 rpm	1,510 kg (3,330 lb)	11.7 s	185 km/h (115 mph)	12.8 L/100 km (18.4 mpg_{‑US})	7,704
280	123.030	12/75–7/81	M110 V 28 (110.923); I6	2746 cc	Solex 4A Carburettor	156 PS (115 kW; 154 hp) at 5,500 rpm	223 N⋅m (164 lb⋅ft) at 4,000 rpm	1,455 kg (3,208 lb)	10.6 s	190 km/h (118 mph)	13.8 L/100 km (17.0 mpg_{‑US})	33,206
280 C	123.050	4/77–3/80	M110 V 28 (110.923); I6	2746 cc	Solex 4A Carburettor	156 PS (115 kW; 154 hp) at 5,500 rpm	223 N⋅m (164 lb⋅ft) at 4,000 rpm	1,455 kg (3,208 lb)	10.6 s	190 km/h (118 mph)	13.1 L/100 km (18.0 mpg_{‑US})	3,704
280 E	123.033	12/75–3/78	M110 E 28 (110.984); I6	2746 cc	Bosch K-Jetronic Fuel Injection	177 PS (130 kW; 175 hp) at 6,000 rpm	234 N⋅m (173 lb⋅ft) at 4,500 rpm	1,475 kg (3,252 lb)	9.9 s	200 km/h (124 mph)	13.3 L/100 km (17.7 mpg_{‑US})	126,004
280 E	123.033	4/78–9/81	M110 E 28 (110.988); I6	2746 cc	Bosch K-Jetronic Fuel Injection	185 PS (136 kW; 182 hp) at 5,800 rpm	240 N⋅m (177 lb⋅ft) at 4,500 rpm	1,475 kg (3,252 lb)	9.9 s	200 km/h (124 mph)	13.3 L/100 km (17.7 mpg_{‑US})	126,004
280 E	123.033	10/81–12/85	M110 E 28 (110.988); I6	2746 cc	Bosch K-Jetronic Fuel Injection	185 PS (136 kW; 182 hp) at 5,800 rpm	240 N⋅m (177 lb⋅ft) at 4,500 rpm	1,475 kg (3,252 lb)	9.9 s	200 km/h (124 mph)	12 L/100 km (20 mpg_{‑US})	126,004
280 CE	123.053	4/77–3/78	M110 E 28 (110.984); I6	2746 cc	Bosch K-Jetronic Fuel Injection	177 PS (130 kW; 175 hp) at 6,000 rpm	234 N⋅m (173 lb⋅ft) at 4,500 rpm	1,475 kg (3,252 lb)	9.9 s	200 km/h (124 mph)	13.3 L/100 km (17.7 mpg_{‑US})	32,176
280 CE	123.053	4/78–9/81	M110 E 28 (110.988); I6	2746 cc	Bosch K-Jetronic Fuel Injection	185 PS (136 kW; 182 hp) at 5,800 rpm	240 N⋅m (177 lb⋅ft) at 4,500 rpm	1,475 kg (3,252 lb)	9.9 s	200 km/h (124 mph)	13.3 L/100 km (17.7 mpg_{‑US})	32,176
280 CE	123.053	10/81–8/85	M110 E 28 (110.988); I6	2746 cc	Bosch K-Jetronic Fuel Injection	185 PS (136 kW; 182 hp) at 5,800 rpm	240 N⋅m (177 lb⋅ft) at 4,500 rpm	1,475 kg (3,252 lb)	9.9 s	200 km/h (124 mph)	12 L/100 km (20 mpg_{‑US})	32,176
280 TE	123.093	5/78-8/78	M110 E 28 (110.984); I6	2746 cc	Bosch K-Jetronic Fuel Injection	177 PS (130 kW; 175 hp) at 6,000 rpm	234 N⋅m (173 lb⋅ft) at 4,500 rpm	1,475 kg (3,252 lb)	9.9 s	200 km/h (124 mph)	13.3 L/100 km (17.7 mpg_{‑US})	19,789
280 TE	123.093	9/78–9/81	M110 E 28 (110.988); I6	2746 cc	Bosch K-Jetronic Fuel Injection	185 PS (136 kW; 182 hp) at 5,800 rpm	240 N⋅m (177 lb⋅ft) at 4,500 rpm	1,475 kg (3,252 lb)	9.9 s	200 km/h (124 mph)	13.3 L/100 km (17.7 mpg_{‑US})	19,789
280 TE	123.093	10/81–1/86	M110 E 28 (110.988); I6	2746 cc	Bosch K-Jetronic Fuel Injection	185 PS (136 kW; 182 hp) at 5,800 rpm	240 N⋅m (177 lb⋅ft) at 4,500 rpm	1,475 kg (3,252 lb)	9.9 s	200 km/h (124 mph)	12 L/100 km (20 mpg_{‑US})	19,789

Diesel Engines
Model	Chassis	Years	Configuration	Displ.	Fuel Delivery	Power	Torque	Empty Weight	0–100 km/h (0–62 mph)	Top Speed	Fuel Consumption	Units
200 D	123.120	2/76–1/79	OM 615 D 20 (615.940); I4	1988 cc	Bosch indirect injection with precombustion chamber	55 PS (40 kW; 54 hp) at 4,200 rpm	113 N⋅m (83 lb⋅ft) at 2,400 rpm	1,390 kg (3,060 lb)	31 s	130 km/h (81 mph)	8.9 L/100 km (26 mpg_{‑US})	378,138
200 D	123.120	2/79–4/85	OM 615 D 20 (615.940); I4	1988 cc	Bosch indirect injection with precombustion chamber	60 PS (44 kW; 59 hp) at 4,400 rpm	113 N⋅m (83 lb⋅ft) at 2,500 rpm	1,390 kg (3,060 lb)	27.4 s	135 km/h (84 mph)	8.9 L/100 km (26 mpg_{‑US})	378,138
220 D	123.126	2/76–3/79	OM 615 D 22 (615.941); I4	2197 cc	Bosch indirect injection with precombustion chamber	60 PS (44 kW; 59 hp) at 4,200 rpm	126 N⋅m (93 lb⋅ft) at 2,400 rpm	1,380 kg (3,040 lb)	28.1 s	135 km/h (84 mph)	9 L/100 km (26 mpg_{‑US})	56.736
240 D	123.123	2/76–7/78	OM 616 D 24 (616.916); I4	2404 cc	Bosch indirect injection with precombustion chamber	65 PS (48 kW; 64 hp) at 4,200 rpm	137 N⋅m (101 lb⋅ft) at 2,400 rpm	1,395 kg (3,075 lb)	24.6 s	138 km/h (86 mph)	9.3 L/100 km (25 mpg_{‑US})	449,780
240 D	123.123	8/78–9/81	OM 616 D 24 (616.912); I4	2399 cc	Bosch indirect injection with precombustion chamber	72 PS (53 kW; 71 hp) at 4,400 rpm	137 N⋅m (101 lb⋅ft) at 2,400 rpm	1,395 kg (3,075 lb)	22 s	143 km/h (89 mph)	9.3 L/100 km (25 mpg_{‑US})	449,780
240 D	123.123	10/81–11/85	OM 616 D 24 (616.912); I4	2399 cc	Bosch indirect injection with precombustion chamber	72 PS (53 kW; 71 hp) at 4,400 rpm	137 N⋅m (101 lb⋅ft) at 2,400 rpm	1,395 kg (3,075 lb)	22 s	143 km/h (89 mph)	8.9 L/100 km (26 mpg_{‑US})	449,780
240 TD	123.183	5/78–8/79	OM 616 D 24 (616.912); I4	2404 cc	Bosch indirect injection with precombustion chamber	65 PS (48 kW; 64 hp) at 4,200 rpm	137 N⋅m (101 lb⋅ft) at 2,400 rpm	1,515 kg (3,340 lb)	25.8 s	138 km/h (86 mph)	9.6 L/100 km (25 mpg_{‑US})	38,903
240 TD	123.183	9/79–1/86	OM 616 D 24 (616.912); I4	2399 cc	Bosch indirect injection with precombustion chamber	72 PS (53 kW; 71 hp) at 4,400 rpm	137 N⋅m (101 lb⋅ft) at 2,400 rpm	1,515 kg (3,340 lb)	23.2 s	143 km/h (89 mph)	8.9 L/100 km (26 mpg_{‑US})	38,903
300 D	123.130	2/76–8/79	OM 617 D 30 (617.912); I5	3005 cc	Bosch indirect injection with precombustion chamber	80 PS (59 kW; 79 hp) at 4,000 rpm	172 N⋅m (127 lb⋅ft) at 2,400 rpm	1,450 kg (3,200 lb)	19.9 s	148 km/h (92 mph)	9.9 L/100 km (24 mpg_{‑US})	324,718
300 D	123.130	9/79–9/81	OM 617 D 30 (617.912); I5	2998 cc	Bosch indirect injection with precombustion chamber	88 PS (65 kW; 87 hp) at 4,400 rpm	172 N⋅m (127 lb⋅ft) at 2,400 rpm	1,450 kg (3,200 lb)	17.8 s	155 km/h (96 mph)	9.9 L/100 km (24 mpg_{‑US})	324,718
300 D	123.130	10/81–11/85	OM 617 D 30 (617.912); I5	2998 cc	Bosch indirect injection with precombustion chamber	88 PS (65 kW; 87 hp) at 4,400 rpm	172 N⋅m (127 lb⋅ft) at 2,400 rpm	1,450 kg (3,200 lb)	17.8 s	155 km/h (96 mph)	9.3 L/100 km (25 mpg_{‑US})	324,718
300 CD	123.150	9/77–8/79	OM 617 D 30 (617.912); I5	3005 cc	Bosch indirect injection with precombustion chamber	80 PS (59 kW; 79 hp) at 4,000 rpm	172 N⋅m (127 lb⋅ft) at 2,400 rpm	1,450 kg (3,200 lb)	20.8 s	143 km/h (89 mph)	9.9 L/100 km (24 mpg_{‑US})	7,502
300 CD	123.150	9/79–8/81	OM 617 D 30 (617.912); I5	2998 cc	Bosch indirect injection with precombustion chamber	88 PS (65 kW; 87 hp) at 4,400 rpm	172 N⋅m (127 lb⋅ft) at 2,400 rpm	1,450 kg (3,200 lb)	19.2 s	150 km/h (93 mph)	9.9 L/100 km (24 mpg_{‑US})	7,502
300 TD	123.190	5/78–8/79	OM 617 D 30 (617.912); I5	3005 cc	Bosch indirect injection with precombustion chamber	80 PS (59 kW; 79 hp) at 4,000 rpm	172 N⋅m (127 lb⋅ft) at 2,400 rpm	1,570 kg (3,460 lb)	20.9 s	148 km/h (92 mph)	9.9 L/100 km (24 mpg_{‑US})	36,874
300 TD	123.190	9/79–9/81	OM 617 D 30 (617.912); I5	2998 cc	Bosch indirect injection with precombustion chamber	88 PS (65 kW; 87 hp) at 4,400 rpm	172 N⋅m (127 lb⋅ft) at 2,400 rpm	1,570 kg (3,460 lb)	18.9 s	155 km/h (96 mph)	9.9 L/100 km (24 mpg_{‑US})	36,874
300 TD	123.190	9/81–1/86	OM 617 D 30 (617.912); I5	2998 cc	Bosch indirect injection with precombustion chamber	88 PS (65 kW; 87 hp) at 4,400 rpm	172 N⋅m (127 lb⋅ft) at 2,400 rpm	1,570 kg (3,460 lb)	18.9 s	155 km/h (96 mph)	9.3 L/100 km (25 mpg_{‑US})	36,874
300 D Turbodiesel (USA only)	123.133	8/81–9/82	OM 617 D 30 A (617.952); I5 turbo	2998 cc	Bosch Fuel Injection with precombustion chamber and Garrett T3 turbocharger	121 PS (89 kW; 119 hp) at 4,350 rpm	230 N⋅m (170 lb⋅ft) at 2,400 rpm	1,525 kg (3,362 lb)	14.0 s	165 km/h (103 mph)	9.9 L/100 km (24 mpg_{‑US})	75,261
300 D Turbodiesel (USA only)	123.133	10/82–8/85	OM 617 D 30 A (617.952); I5 turbo	2998 cc	Bosch Fuel Injection with precombustion chamber and Garrett T3 turbocharger	125 PS (92 kW; 123 hp) at 4,350 rpm	250 N⋅m (184 lb⋅ft) at 2,400 rpm	1,525 kg (3,362 lb)	14.0 s	170 km/h (106 mph)	9.9 L/100 km (24 mpg_{‑US})	75,261
300 CD Turbodiesel (USA only)	123.153	7/81–9/82	OM 617 D 30 A (617.952); I5 turbo	2998 cc	Bosch Fuel Injection with precombustion chamber and Garrett T3 turbocharger	125 PS (92 kW; 123 hp) at 4,350 rpm	250 N⋅m (184 lb⋅ft) at 2,400 rpm	1,625 kg (3,583 lb)	14.0 s	165 km/h (103 mph)	Unknown	8,007
300 CD Turbodiesel (USA only)	123.153	10/82-8/85	OM 617 D 30 A (617.952); I5 turbo	2998 cc	Bosch Fuel Injection with precombustion chamber and Garrett T3 turbocharger	125 PS (92 kW; 123 hp) at 4,350 rpm	250 N⋅m (184 lb⋅ft) at 2,400 rpm	1,625 kg (3,583 lb)	14.0 s	170 km/h (106 mph)	Unknown	8,007
300 TD Turbodiesel	123.193	10/80–8/81	OM 617 D 30 A (617.952); I5 turbo	2998 cc	Bosch Fuel Injection with precombustion chamber and Garrett T3 turbocharger	125 PS (92 kW; 123 hp) at 4,350 rpm	250 N⋅m (184 lb⋅ft) at 2,400 rpm	1,625 kg (3,583 lb)	15.0 s	165 km/h (103 mph)	9.9 L/100 km (24 mpg_{‑US})	28,219
300 TD Turbodiesel	123.193	9/81–1/86	OM 617 D 30 A (617.952); I5 turbo	2998 cc	Bosch Fuel Injection with precombustion chamber and Garrett T3 turbocharger	125 PS (92 kW; 123 hp) at 4,350 rpm	250 N⋅m (184 lb⋅ft) at 2,400 rpm	1,625 kg (3,583 lb)	15.0 s	165 km/h (103 mph)	9.8 L/100 km (24 mpg_{‑US})	28,219

=== North America and Japan ===
In these markets, only the following models were offered:

Model	Model Years	Engine	Power	Torque
Petrol Engines
230	1977–1978	2.3 L M115 I4	93 hp (69 kW) at 4,800	125 lb⋅ft (169 N⋅m) at 2,500
280 E	1977–1979	2.8 L M110 fuel injected I6	142 hp (106 kW) at 5,750	149 lb⋅ft (202 N⋅m) at 4,600
280 E	1977–1978 (Note: California model)	2.8 L M110 fuel injected I6	137 hp (102 kW) at 5,750	142 lb⋅ft (193 N⋅m) at 4,600
280 E	1980–1981	2.8 L M110 fuel injected I6	140 hp (104 kW) at 5,500	145 lb⋅ft (197 N⋅m) at 4,600
280 CE	1979	2.8 L M110 fuel injected I6	142 hp (106 kW) at 5,750	149 lb⋅ft (202 N⋅m) at 4,600
280 CE	1979	2.8 L M110 fuel injected I6	137 hp (102 kW) at 5,750	142 lb⋅ft (193 N⋅m) at 4,600
280 CE	1980–1981	2.8 L M110 fuel injected I6	140 hp (104 kW) at 5,500	145 lb⋅ft (197 N⋅m) at 4,600
Diesel Engines
240 D	1977–1980	2.4 L OM616 I4	62 hp (46 kW) at 4,000	97 lb⋅ft (132 N⋅m) at 2,400
240 D	1981–1983	2.4 L OM616 I4	67 hp (50 kW) at 4,000	97 lb⋅ft (132 N⋅m) at 2,400
300 D	1977–1981	3.0 L OM617.912 I5	77 hp (57 kW) at 4,000	115 lb⋅ft (156 N⋅m) at 2,400
300 CD	1978–1981	3.0 L OM617.912 I5	77 hp (57 kW) at 4,000	115 lb⋅ft (156 N⋅m) at 2,400
300 TD	1979–1980	3.0 L OM617.912 I5	77 hp (57 kW) at 4,000	115 lb⋅ft (156 N⋅m) at 2,400
300 D Turbodiesel	1981–1985	3.0 L OM617 A I5 turbo	123 hp (92 kW) at 4,350	181 lb⋅ft (245 N⋅m) at 2,400
300 CD Turbodiesel	1981–1985	3.0 L OM617 A I5 turbo	123 hp (92 kW) at 4,350	181 lb⋅ft (245 N⋅m) at 2,400
300 TD Turbodiesel	1981–1985	3.0 L OM617 A I5 turbo	123 hp (92 kW) at 4,350	181 lb⋅ft (245 N⋅m) at 2,400
