= Cars in Miami Vice =

The cars in Miami Vice mainly involve the Ferrari Daytona Spyder and the Ferrari Testarossa, but also include other automobiles driven by the characters on the show. Currently one Daytona (Car #4) is in a private collection and the other (Car #1) is on display at the Volo Auto Museum; the Ferrari Testarossa stunt car resides in Kingsport, Tennessee and is owned by Carl Roberts of Carl Roberts Motor Group. Today, one of the hero cars (Ferrari Testarossa chassis #63631) is part of The Witvoet collection owned by Bastiaan Witvoet in Belgium.

== Daytona Spyder ==
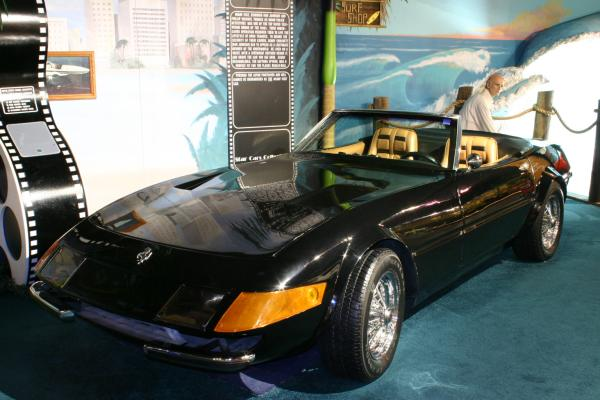
Ferrari Daytona like the one used in the show

During the first two seasons and two episodes from the third season, Detective Sonny Crockett drove a black 1972 Ferrari Daytona Spyder 365 GTS/4 replica with a Florida license plate ZAQ178. Ferrari North America had turned down the request by Miami Vice for authentic Ferraris (they did the same with Magnum, P.I., forcing that production to purchase 308 GTSs). Although Tom McBurnie is credited with planting the Daytona Spyder in the mind of the public, it was actually Al Mardekian, an importer of gray-market exotic cars, who sold Miami Vice the two look-alike Ferraris for $49,000 each. In total two Corvette Daytona replicas were used for the show, car 4 and then car 1 after the pilot which acted as the stunt car. McBurnie was hired to build the bodies for the Corvette-chassised cars. It was blown to pieces on the show with a hand-held Stinger missile launcher during an illegal arms deal.

The "Ferraris" used in the first two seasons were actually re-bodied Corvettes based on a 1976 Corvette (car 1) and a 1981 (car 4) Chevrolet Corvette C3 chassis that had been modified with fiberglass body panels by specialty car manufacturer McBurnie Coachcraft to resemble an early-1970s Ferrari Daytona Spyder. the tan and black leather interior as well as the convertible top was fabricated by Scott Draizin/Headsup industries based in Ft. Lauderdale.

Still, the very first scene in the pilot episode which has the black Daytona appearing, though for a few seconds, makes use of a real Ferrari Daytona owned by Dr. Roger Sherman of Coconut Grove, Florida. It can be clearly identified as a real Daytona (American version) by the door handles, side markers, windshield rake, sun visors, width variation and side vent windows. All moving close-up scenes were done on the back of a flatbed truck under the supervision of TIDE Ferrari Racing crew member / model Kimberly Denson of Ft. Lauderdale.

Of the four Daytonas built under the Mardekian/McBurnie partnership, the first and fourth were purchased by the production company. The fourth is on display at the Petersen Automotive Museum, which has produced an extensive, detailed video about the cars, their construction, ownership, and screen use.

== Testarossa ==
"Why beat a real Ferrari to death with power slides and 180s or mar its flawless skin with camera mounts for tight driver's shots when a stand-in stunt car could do the job quite nicely?"

— Carl Roberts

Ferrari filed a lawsuit demanding McBurnie and four others to stop producing and selling Ferrari replicas. Miami Vice producers, on the other hand, wanted no legal troubles, and accepted Ferrari's offer of two free 1986 Testarossas on the condition that the replicas be destroyed. Carl Roberts offered to build two new Daytonas for the 1987 season (third season of Miami Vice). When Roberts learned that the Daytona was out, he proposed a trade: he would build Miami Vice a Testarossa stunt car in return for the doomed Daytona. Carl's original plan was to remove the Daytona skin from the Corvette and replace it with Testarossa body pieces, but this yielded poor results and led Roberts to devise another plan.

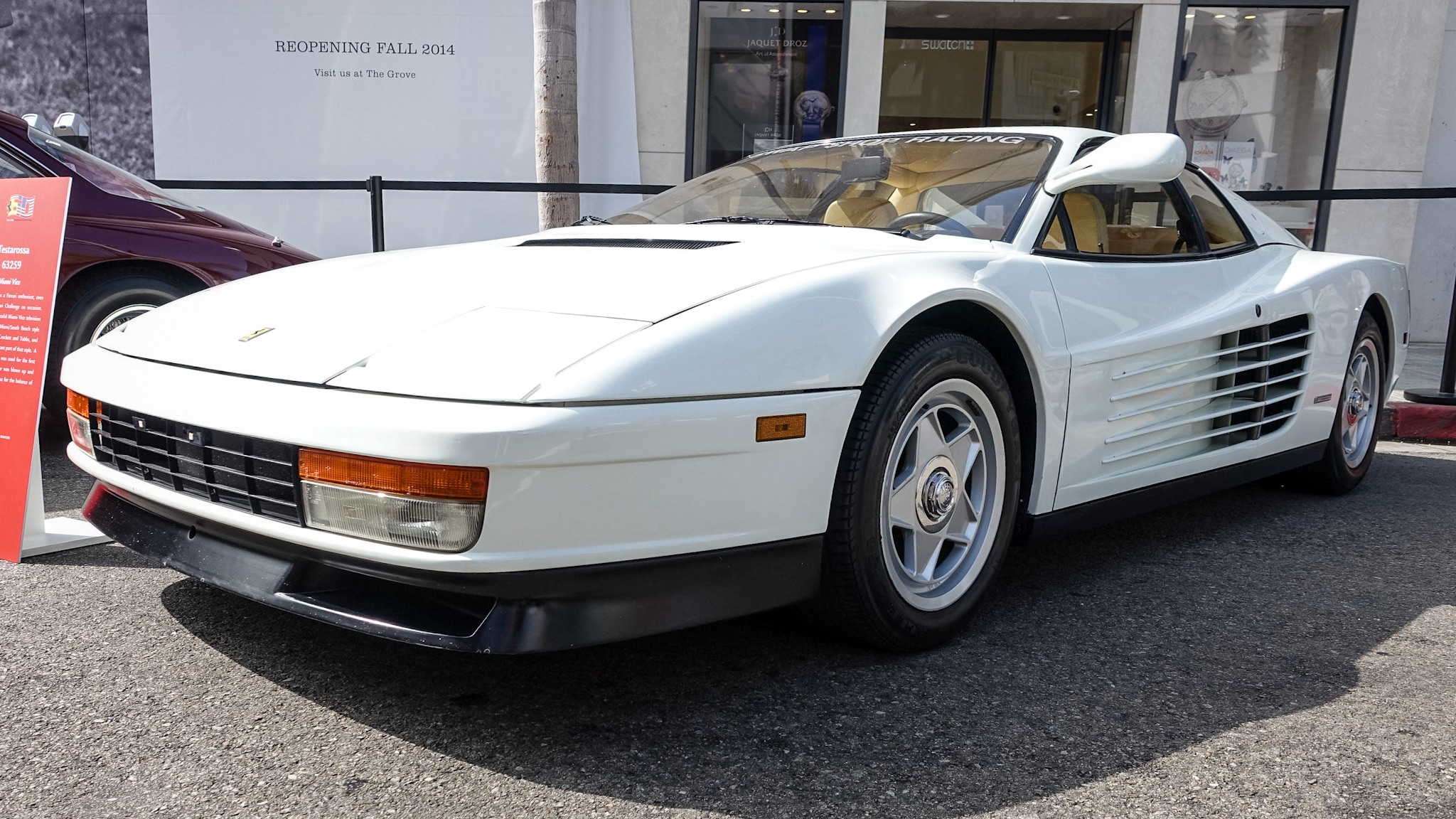
1986 Ferrari Testarossa #63631

Roberts searched and found a 1972 De Tomaso Pantera, which was perfectly suited for the Testarossa body pieces. The Pantera was rigidly modified to withstand the duties of filming: it was raised 1.5 inches for additional ground clearance, square tubing 2.5 inch thick was used to reinforce the roof to prevent buckling and a railing was added to support the frame and act as a skid plate. An auxiliary braking system was designed to assist drivers in controlled spins: the master cylinder was repositioned in the brake line to enable it to feed the rear wheels, enabling the driver to lock the aft end on command, and the auxiliary master cylinder utilizes the original master cylinder's reservoir and is installed in series with the outlet of the original master cylinder port leading to the rear wheels. When the stock brake is applied, fluid passes freely through the stunt master cylinder inlet port and compensating port and out the exhaust port to the rear wheels. When the stunt brake is applied, the piston in the master cylinder blocks off the compensating port to the exhaust port and pressurizes the rear brake system, cutting off the original brake master cylinder besides the compensating port in the stunt brake. BF Goodrich TA tires were added for enhanced traction, as were Tilton brake calipers. The improved traction required installation of a hydraulic in-line brake power booster from a Volvo P-1800. It operates on engine vacuum to aid in breaking traction of the TAs. To further enhance the growl of the vehicle, Robert's team installed a NOS port-injected nitrous system, which was later replaced with a plate-type configuration. He also replaced the stock carburetor with a Predator unit which reduces fuel lag. A Modine all-aluminum four-core radiator was used to guard against Miami's hot weather, and liquid Auto-Meter gauges to monitor the temperature.

In the second episode of the third season, Crockett complained to Lt. Castillo about driving vehicles that did not fit his cover as a high-roller drug dealer, that he was going around "looking like Li'l Abner"; Castillo quietly replied "It's out back." Sonny was then delighted to find his new white 1986 Ferrari Testarossa, Florida license plate AIF00M. The original Testarossas donated by Ferrari North America were black metallic but were then painted white. The Testarossa appears in black in the third season premiere episode "When Irish Eyes Are Crying" as Bunny Berrigan's car, then appears in white when it is given to Crockett in the next episode "Stone's War" after the police department confiscated it upon Berrigan's death. Different reasons were given at the time as to why the cars were repainted in white, ranging from a driving mishap by Don Johnson on the set that resulted in one of the cars requiring a new coat of paint, to Michael Mann thinking that, unlike the Daytona, the black exterior paint did not make the Testarossa look good enough in night scenes. One of the two main Testarossas used in filming recently resided on display at The Fort Lauderdale Swap Shop. The Swap Shop's owner purchased the car from NBC for $750,000 and has reportedly turned down $1,000,000 offers for it. The other White Ferrari Testarossa was owned by Peter Lima, of Real Muscle Car Boutique also located in Miami, Florida and was put up for auction for $1.75 million through eBay in December 2014, after gaining a lot of buzz from the media. Today, the hero car (Ferrari Testarossa chassis #63631) is documented by Ferrari Classiche and is part of a collection currently owned by Adams Classic & Collector Cars in Buford, GA.

== Other characters ==
Ricardo Tubbs drove a 1964 Cadillac Coupe de Ville Convertible. and a 1982 Pontiac Firebird Trans Am in the pilot episode.

Stan Switek drove a turquoise 1961 Ford Thunderbird. Gina Calabrese drove a 1971 Mercury Cougar XR-7 convertible. When Stan and Larry were undercover, they drove a Dodge Ram Van. Crockett's ex-wife drove a 1983 Ford LTD Country Squire.

== Notable cars ==
Other notable vehicles that appeared in Miami Vice (other than a Ferrari), that were driven by villains, police officers, and other characters on the show included, brands such as Lamborghini, AMG Mercedes-Benz, BMW, Maserati, Lotus, DeLorean, Porsche, and Corvettes. American muscle cars, such as the GTO, Trans Am, Mustang, Chevrolet Camaro, and a Plymouth Barracuda also made appearances.

=== Season 1 ===
- 1981 Buick Electra Park Avenue
- 1983 Cadillac Eldorado
- 1975 Chevrolet Monza Towne
- 1981 Chevrolet Monte Carlo
- 1982 Chevrolet Camaro
- Ford C-Series
- 1973 GMC C-Series
- 1981 Mercedes-Benz S-Klasse Stretched Limousine
- 1982 Plymouth Gran Fury
- 1976 Pontiac LeMans
- 1983 BMW 633 CSi
- 1980 Cadillac DeVille Stretched Limousine
- 1974 Chevrolet Corvette Stingray
- 1982 Pontiac Firebird Trans Am
- Rolls-Royce Phantom V
- Rolls-Royce Silver Cloud III
- 1959 Rolls-Royce Silver Cloud II
- 1975 Toyota Corona Hardtop
- 1980 Volkswagen Rabbit Convertible I (Type 17)
- 1980 Rapid Transit Series
- 1977 Buick Electra 225
- 1980 Cadillac Sedan DeVille Stretched Limousine
- 1981 Chevrolet Malibu
- 1979 Chevrolet Camaro Z28
- 1983 Ford LTD
- 1984 Ford Mustang
- 1984 Lincoln Town Car
- 1980 Mercury Zephyr
- 1979 AMC Spirit
- 1973 Chevrolet C-60
- 1973 Chevrolet Nova
- 1975 Chevrolet Chevy Van
- 1976 Chevrolet Monte Carlo
- 1981 Datsun 210
- 1974 Dodge Sportsman
- 1982 Dodge Ram Wagon
- 1984 Dodge Omni
- Fiat-Allis 11 B
- 1962 Ford Thunderbird
- 1965 Ford Mustang
- 1969 Pontiac LeMans
- 1975 Toyota Corolla Wagon
- 1980 Toyota Corolla Tercel
- 1984 Buick Regal
- 1984 Cadillac Fleetwood
- 1983 Chevrolet Camaro
- Mercedes-Benz 500 SEL
- 1968 Pontiac GTO
- Mercedes-Benz 500 SEC
- 1975 Checker Marathon
- 1980 Maserati Quattroporte III
- 1981 DMC DeLorean
- 1955 Ford F-100
- 1983 Maserati Biturbo
- 1937 Packard
- 1969 Rolls-Royce Silver Shadow I
- 1968 Chevrolet Corvette
- 1975 Fiat 124 Spider
- 1956 Ford Thunderbird
- 1972 Mercedes-Benz 350 SLC
- Lamborghini Countach S
- Mercedes-Benz 600 Pullman
- 1976 Mercedes-Benz 450SEL 6.9
- 1974 Checker Marathon
- 1967 Ford Mustang
- 1963 MG B
- 1978 Ford Thunderbird
- 1970 Dodge Challenger R/T
- 1961 Ford Thunderbird
- Porsche Kremer Racing 935 Gr.5 Street
- 1983 Renault Alliance
- 1969 Chevrolet Camaro RS
- 1981 Chevrolet Corvette
- 1971 Mercedes-Benz 350 SL
- 1980 Mercedes-Benz
- 1985 Pontiac Grand Am
- 1983 BMW 733i
- 1978 Cadillac Fleetwood 75 Limousine
- 1977 Pontiac Firebird Trans Am
- 1972 International Harvester Loadstar 1700
- 1979 Lincoln Continental
- 1971 Plymouth Satellite
- 1975 Plymouth Fury

=== Season 2 ===
- Rolls-Royce Camargue
- 1972 AMC Jeep CJ-5
- 1958 Cadillac Eldorado Biarritz
- 1980 Checker Marathon
- 1941 Dodge WC 41
- 1944 Dodge WC 51
- 1981 Mercedes-Benz S-Klasse Stretched Limousine
- 1978 Porsche 928
- 1974 Rolls-Royce Silver Shadow I
- Rolls-Royce Silver Spur
- 1941 Willys MB 'Jeep'
- 1969 Cadillac Fleetwood 75 Limousine
- 1957 Chevrolet 3100
- 1976 Ferrari 308 GTBi
- 1961 Ford Thunderbird
- 1983 Porsche 911 SC Cabrio
- 1954 Reo Comet
- 1981 Lamborghini Jalpa
- 1985 Pontiac Firebird Trans Am Autoform
- 1978 Chevrolet Corvette
- Mercedes-Benz SL
- Nova Sterling
- 1984 Chevrolet Corvette
- 1973 Ford Mustang
- 1984 Chevrolet Corvette
- 1985 Ford Mustang
- 1948 GMC 300
- 1958 Lincoln Premiere
- 1978 Mercedes-Benz 280 CE
- 1981 Peugeot 505
- 1955 Studebaker Commander Regal
- 1985 Lincoln Town Car Stretched Limousine
- 1985 Lamborghini Countach 5000 Quattrovalvole
- Lamborghini Countach 5000 S
- 1974 Mercedes-Benz S-Klasse Stretched Limousine
- 1975 MG B GT
- Porsche 911 Turbo
- Reo Gold Comet
- 1984 Chevrolet Corvette
- Chevrolet Corvette GTP (Lola T711)
- 1980 Maserati Quattroporte III
- 1984 Pontiac Firebird Trans Am
- 1973 Porsche 911 Targa
- 1969 BMW 3.0 CSi
- 1969 Chevrolet Corvette Stingray
- 1984 Nissan 300ZX
- AC Shelby Cobra
- Ferrari 365 GTS/4
- Argo JM16
- Argo JM19
- Aston Martin Nimrod NRA/C2
- 1984 Chevrolet Corvette
- 1986 Ford Mustang Probe
- Honda ATC 200S
- Jaguar XJR-5 (Fabcar)
- 1984 Kawasaki 600 R Ninja
- Lola T600
- Lola T616
- March 82G
- March 84G
- March 85G
- 1983 Maserati Biturbo
- 1981 Mazda RX-7
- Nissan GTP ZX-Turbo
- 1985 Pontiac Firebird
- Porsche 906
- Porsche 962
- 1957 Ford Thunderbird
- 1984 Lincoln Town Car Stretched Limousine
- Mercedes-Benz SL
- Jeep CJ
- 1979 Mercedes-Benz 300 TD

=== Season 3 ===
- Checker Taxicab
- 1986 Ferrari Testarossa
- Jeep CJ
- Mazda RX-7
- 1975 MG Midget
- 1971 Opel Manta
- Chevrolet Apache
- M151 jeep
- Aston Martin V8 Volante
- 1983 Cadillac Fleetwood 75 Limousine
- 1985 Cadillac Professional Coach
- 1983 Ford Thunderbird
- 1985 Ford Mustang
- 1984 Nissan 200SX
- Porsche 944
- Chevrolet Camaro
- 1955 Chevrolet Two-Ten Delray
- 1970 Ford Torino GT
- 1977 Ford Thunderbird
- Lincoln Town Car Stretched Limousine
- Pontiac GTO
- 1974 Mercedes-Benz 280
- Lotus Esprit Turbo
- Peugeot 505
- 1974 BMW 2002
- 1954 Ford Crestline Victoria
- 1957 Mercedes-Benz 300d
- Plymouth Barracuda
- 1982 Cadillac Fleetwood Brougham Stretched Limousine
- Mercedes-Benz 560 SEL
- 1976 Pontiac Grand Prix
- Renault LeCar
- Zimmer Golden Spirit
- 1984 Dodge Caravan

=== Season 4 ===
- 1974 Mercedes-Benz 450 SEL
- 1984 Lamborghini Jalpa
- 1981 DMC DeLorean

=== Season 5 ===
- Lamborghini LM-002
- 1982 Aston Martin Lagonda Stretched Limousine MkII
- 1971 Mustang convertible M code.
- 1987 Buick Grand National. Episode 16
