= Mercedes-Benz 280 =

Mercedes-Benz has sold a number of automobiles with the "280" model name:

- 1959–1968 W111
  - 1967–1971 280SE Coupe & Cabrio
  - 1969–1971 280SE 3.5 Coupe & Cabrio
- 1968–1971 W113
  - 1968–1971 280SL
- 1965–1973 W108
  - 1968–1972 280SEL
  - 1968–1972 280SE
  - 1969–1971 280S
  - 1971–1973 280SEL 3.5 (& 4.5 - North America only)
  - 1971–1973 280SE 3.5 (& 4.5 - North America only)
- 1972–1976 W114
  - 1972–1976 280
  - 1973–1976 280C + 280CE
- 1975–1980 W116
  - 1975–1976 280S
  - 1977–1980 280SE + SEL
- 1977–1981 W123
  - 1977–1981 280E
- 1975/12–1986/01 W123
  - 1975/12–1981/07 280
  - 1975/12–1985/12 280E
  - 1977/04–1980/03 280C
  - 1977/04–1985/08 280CE
  - 1978/05–1986/01 280TE
- 1994 W202
  - 1994 C280
