= Mercedes-Benz W126 =

Luxory motor vehicle from 1979

Mercedes-Benz W126/C126
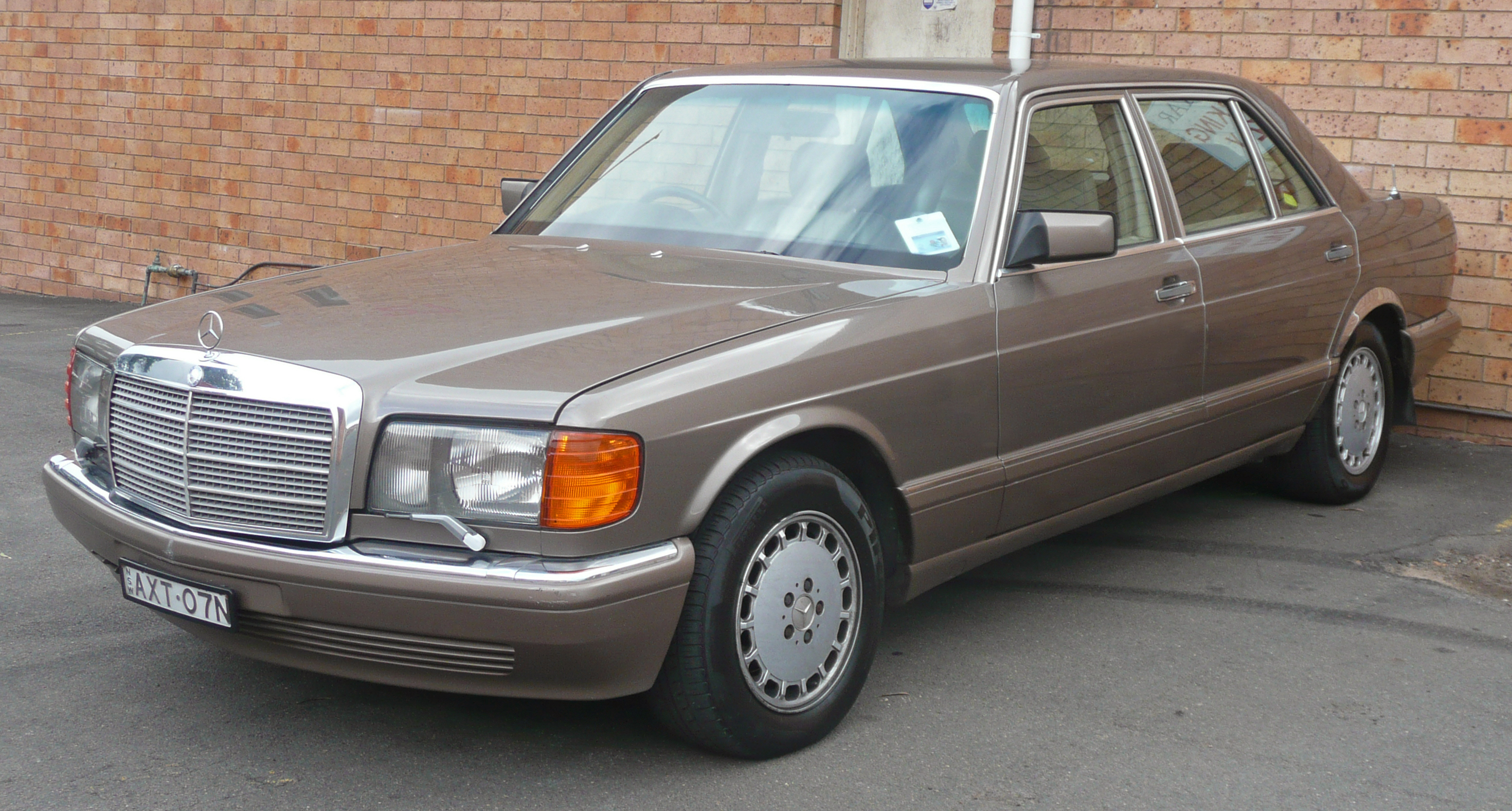

Overview
- Manufacturer: Daimler-Benz
- Production: December 1979 – October 1991 (saloon); September 1981 – October 1991 (coupé); 1980–1993 (saloon, South Africa); 1982–1991 (coupé, South Africa)
- Model years: 1981–1991 (North America)
- Assembly: Germany: Sindelfingen; Malaysia: Johor Bahru (OASB); South Africa: East London
- Designer: Bruno Sacco, Werner Breitschwerdt (saloon: 1975, 1976; coupé: 1977)

Body and chassis
- Class: Full-size luxury car (F); Grand tourer (C126)
- Body style: 4-door saloon 2-door coupé (C126)
- Layout: FR layout
- Related: Monteverdi Tiara

Powertrain
- Engine: petrol; 2.6 L M103 I6; 2.7 L M110 I6; 3.0 L M103 I6; 3.8 L M116 V8; 4.2 L M116 V8; 5.0 L M117 V8; 5.5 L M117 V8; diesel: 3.0 L OM617 I5; 3.0 L OM603 I6; 3.5 L OM603 I6
- Transmission: 4-speed 4G-TRONIC automatic 4-speed manual 5-speed manual

Dimensions
- Wheelbase: SWB Saloon: 2,935 mm (115.6 in); LWB Saloon: 3,075 mm (121.1 in); Coupé: 2,850 mm (112.2 in)
- Length: SWB Saloon: 4,995–5,020 mm (196.7–197.6 in); LWB Saloon: 5,135–5,160 mm (202.2–203.1 in); Coupé: 4,910–4,935 mm (193.3–194.3 in)
- Width: Saloon: 1,820 mm (71.7 in); Coupé: 1,828 mm (72.0 in)
- Height: SWB Saloon: 1,430–1,437 mm (56.3–56.6 in); LWB Saloon: 1,441 mm (56.7 in); Coupé: 1,406 mm (55.4 in)

Chronology
- Predecessor: Mercedes-Benz W116 (saloon); Mercedes-Benz C107 (coupé)
- Successor: Mercedes-Benz W140; Mercedes-Benz C140 (coupé)

The Mercedes-Benz W126 is a series of passenger cars made by Daimler-Benz AG. It was marketed as the second generation of the Mercedes-Benz S-Class, and manufactured in sedan/saloon (1979–1991) as well as coupé (1981–1990) models, succeeding the company's W116 range. Mercedes-Benz introduced the 2-door C126 coupé model, marketed as the SEC, in September 1981. This generation was the first S-Class to have separate chassis codes for standard and long wheelbases (W126 and V126) and for coupé (C126).

Over its 12-year production (1979–1991), 818,066 sedans/saloons and 74,060 coupés were manufactured, totaling 892,126 and making the W126 by far the most successful generation of S-Class to date, because it is the longest in production.

== History ==
After the debut of the W116 S-Class in 1972, Mercedes-Benz began preparing for the next generation S-Class, in October 1973. The project, code-named "Project W126", aimed to provide an improved ride, better handling, and improved fuel efficiency. The 1973 oil crisis and increasingly stringent emission and safety regulations in the United States influenced the development of the W126, leading to reduced emissions and improved fuel efficiency.

The W126 design team, led by Mercedes-Benz's chief designer Bruno Sacco, aimed to design a more aerodynamic shape and retain the unmistakable S-Class design elements. The aerodynamic drag was reduced through lengthy wind tunnel testing and reshaping of the front end and bumper along with hiding the wipers underneath the hood/bonnet for smoother flow. Reducing the weight was accomplished by extensive use of high-strength low-alloy (HSLA) sheet and polyurethane deformable material for bumpers and side claddings. The lighter alloy material was used for the heavily revised M116/M117 V8 engines for reduced weight. Both contributed to the reduction of fuel consumption by 10% as compared to its predecessor.

After six years of development, the W126 was introduced at the IAA Frankfurt in September 1979. At the introduction, S-Class was available in two wheelbase lengths (standard and long) and three petrol engine options with one six-cylinder inline engine and two V8 engines. The diesel engine option was introduced in September 1981 exclusively for the North American market.

At the 1981 IAA Frankfurt, the C126, a coupé version of the S-Class, was introduced with 380 SEC and 500 SEC trims initially offered. It was the first time that a coupé version was derived from an S-Class chassis. However, the styling was different between the two, making it the first time that the coupé had fully distinct styling, later evolving into CL-Class. Carrying on the tradition of past Mercedes coupé models, the C126 featured a pillarless design with no B pillar between the front and rear side windows. At the same time, the "Energiekonzept" (Energy Concept) was introduced to improve the fuel efficiency of S-Class through engine revisions.

The W126 was revised in 1985 for the 1986 model year. The revised "Second Series" model range was introduced at the 1985 IAA Frankfurt with new six-cylinder petrol and diesel engines and the V8 petrol engines enlarged to 4.2 and 5.5 litres. The 5-litre V8 was carried over. Visual changes included smoother bumpers and side claddings, revised "Gullydeckelfelge" (German for manhole-cover wheel rim) alloy wheels, and a deeper front bumper with integrated air dam.

The W126 generation was replaced by the W140 in 1991.

== Styling ==
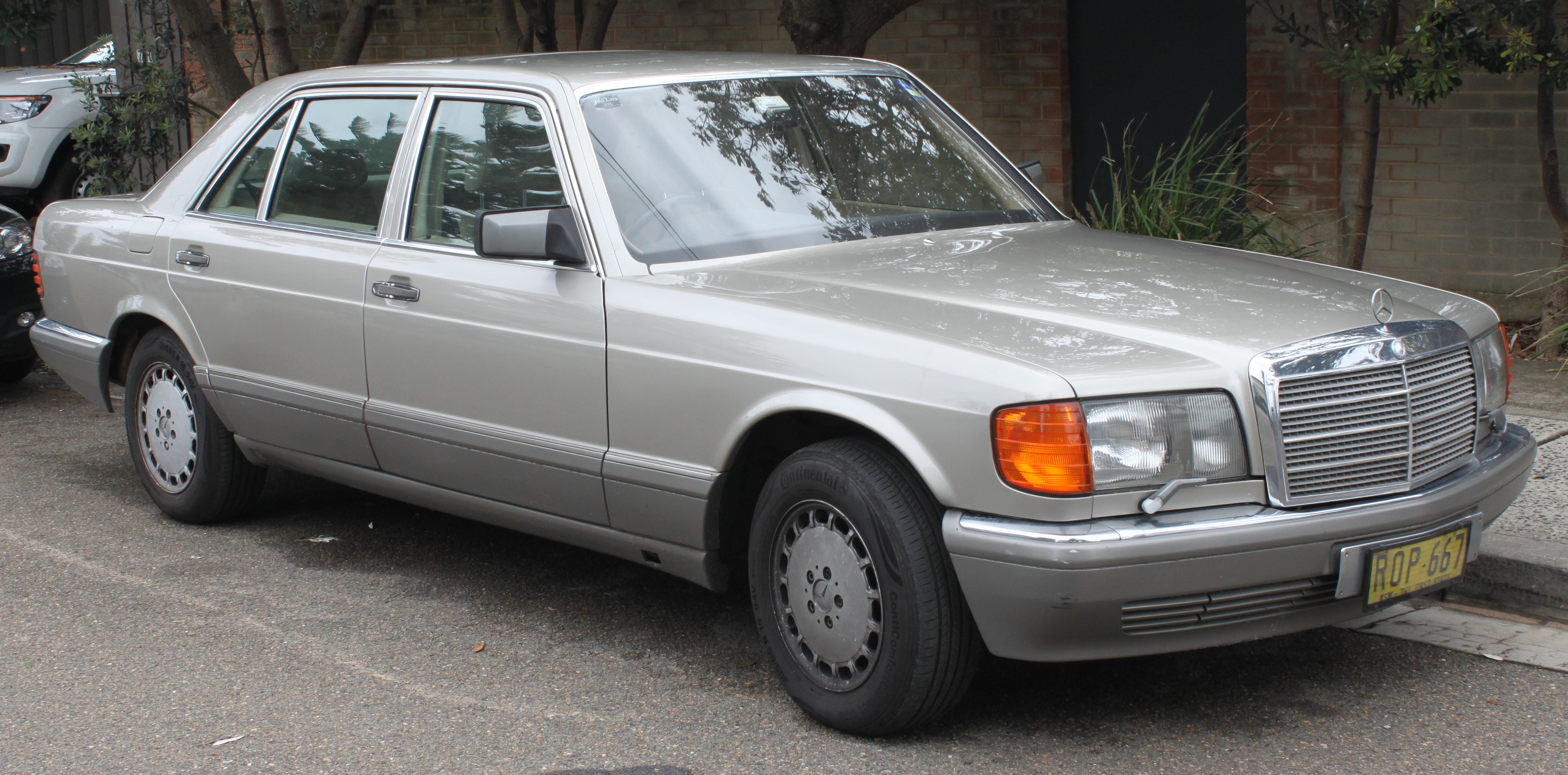
Facelift Mercedes-Benz 560 SEL (V126)

From 1973 to 1975, Mercedes-Benz designers worked on the successor to the W116. After several design concepts were presented, the final design for the W126 was approved and frozen in 1976. The design work for the coupé began immediately after the approval and was finalised in 1977. Design patents were first filed on 3 March 1977 and later on 6 September 1977 at the United States Patent Office.

Compared to its predecessor, the W116, the W126 featured improved aerodynamics with a drag coefficient of Cd 0.36 for the sedan/saloon and 0.34 for the coupés.

== Models ==
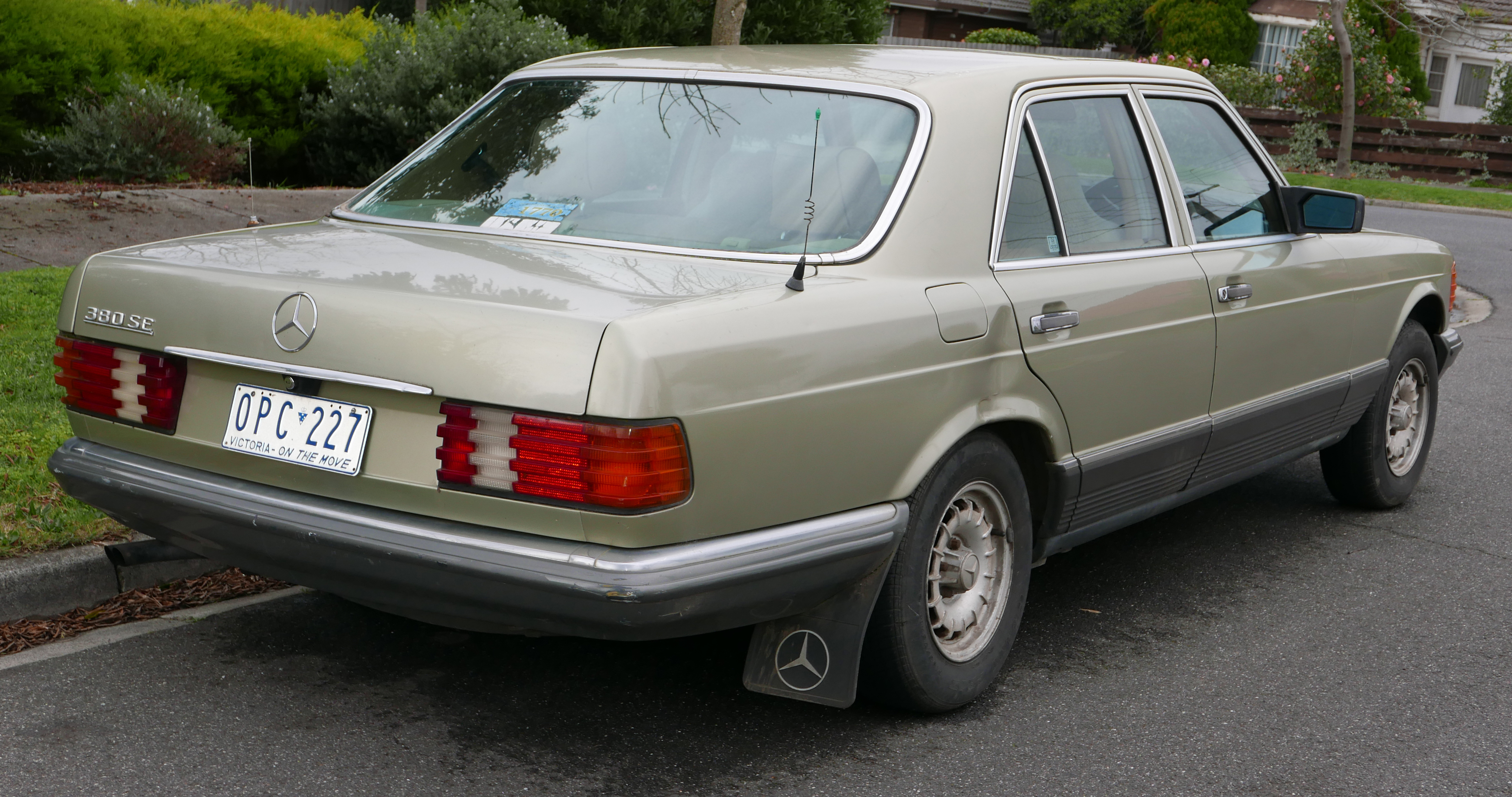
Pre-facelift Mercedes-Benz W126 380 SE (standard wheelbase version)

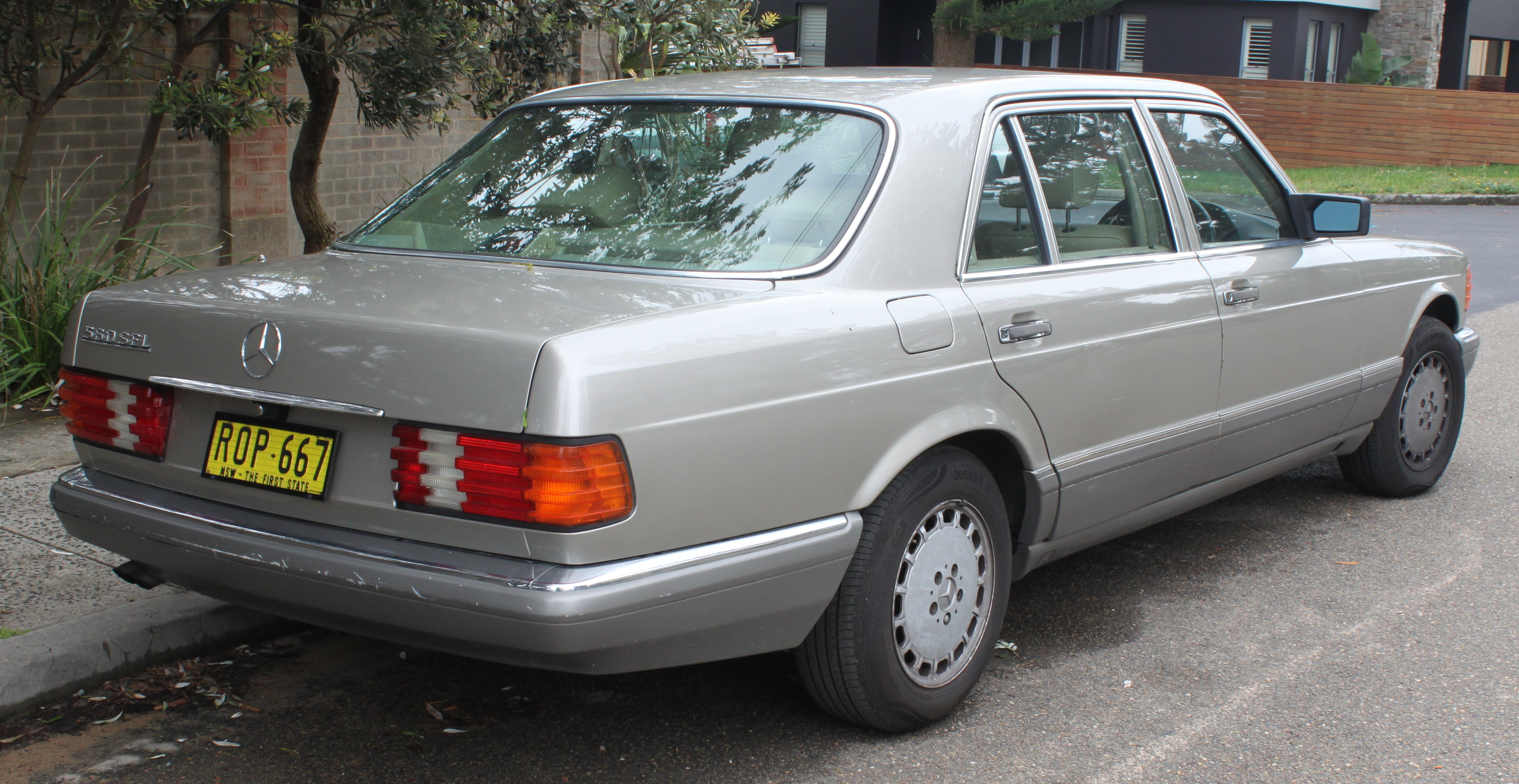
Facelift Mercedes-Benz 560 SEL V126 (long-wheelbase version)

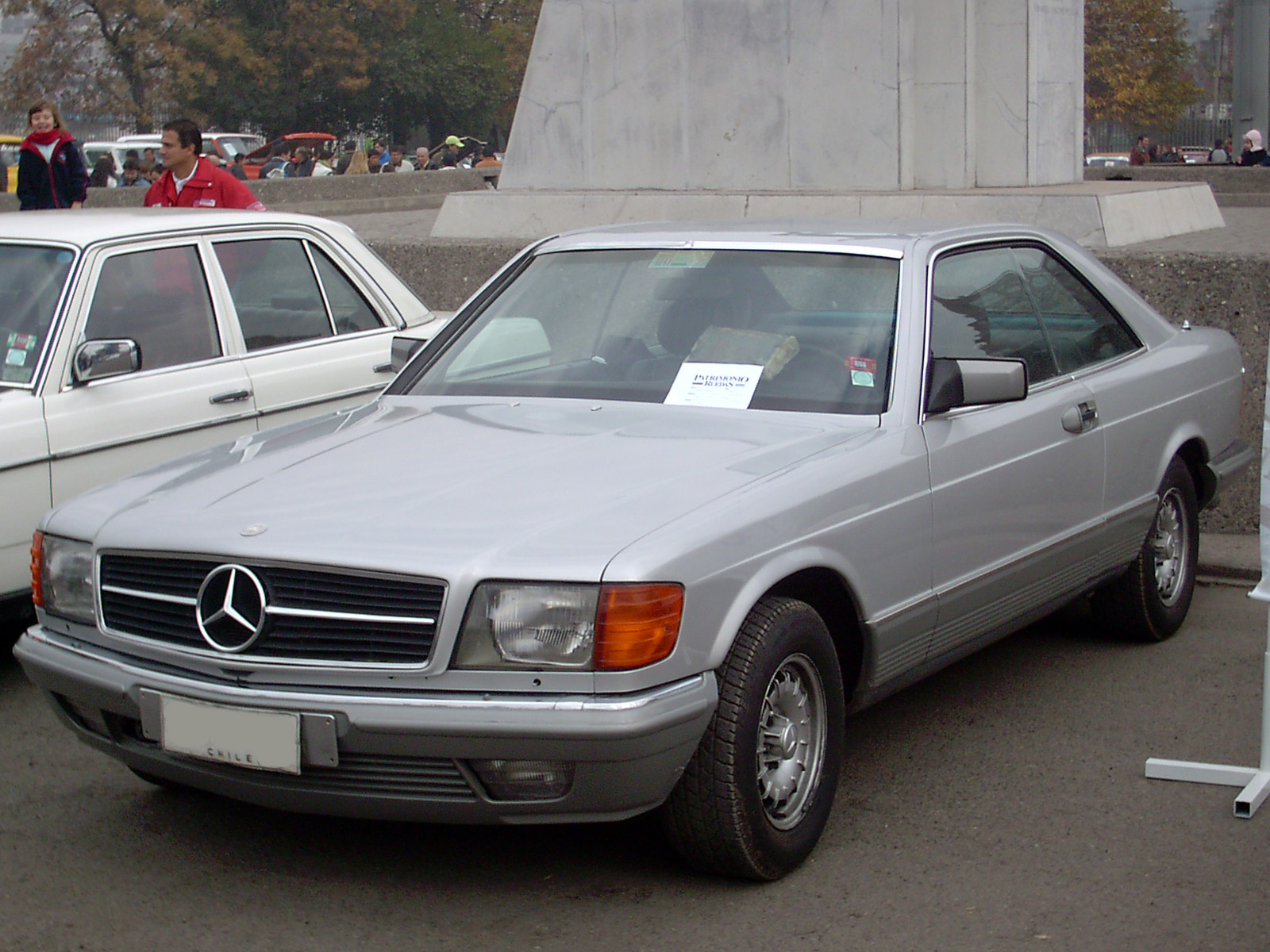
Pre-facelift Mercedes-Benz C126 SEC (coupé)

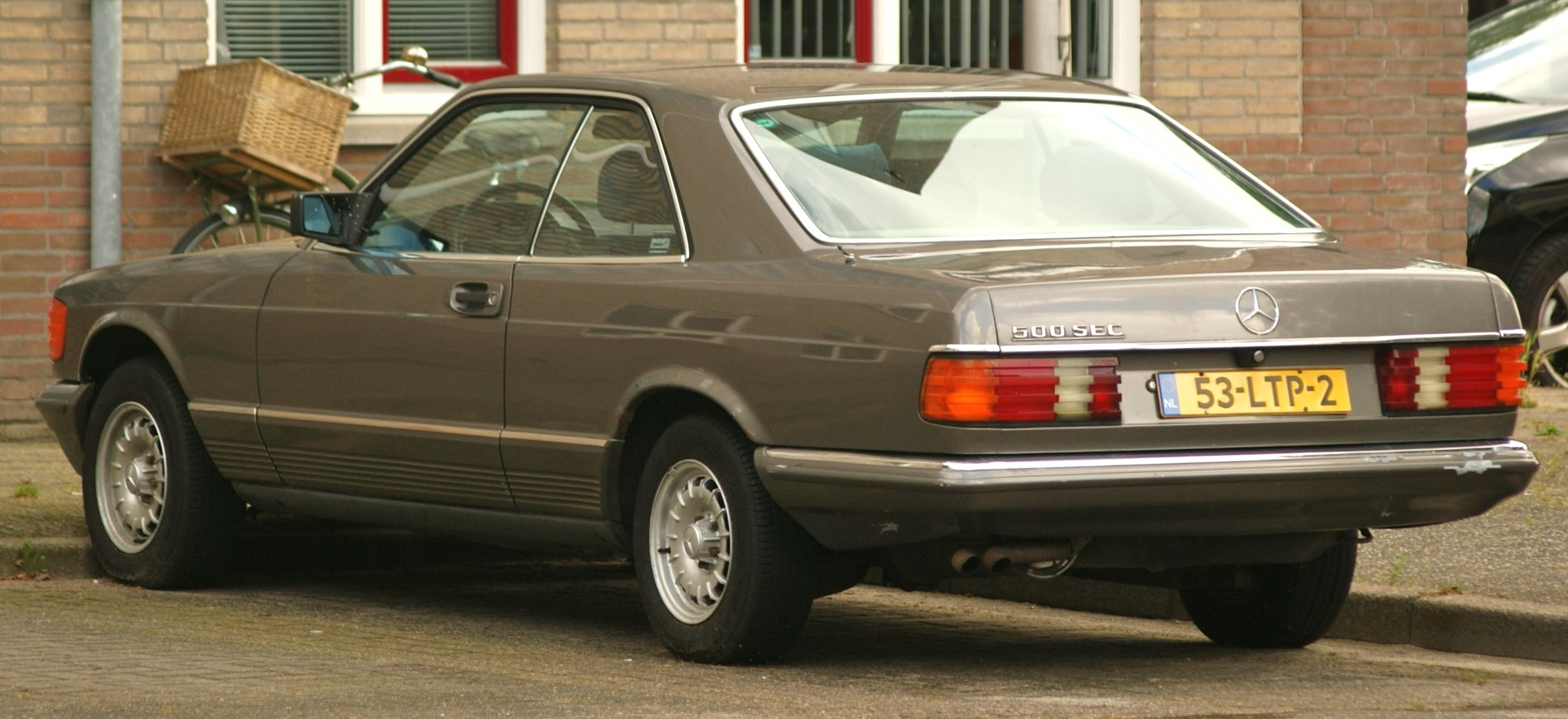
Pre-facelift Mercedes-Benz C126 SEC (coupé)

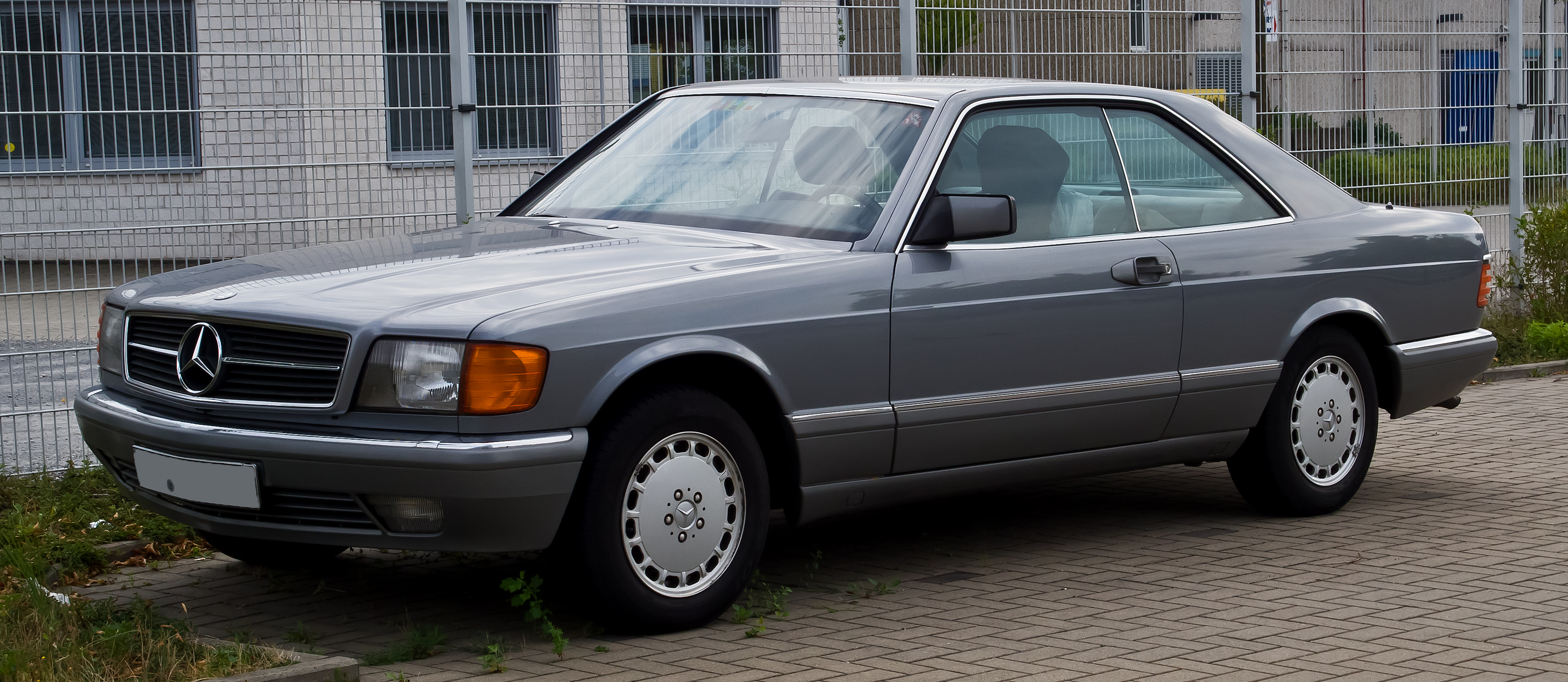
Facelift Mercedes-Benz C126 SEC (coupé)

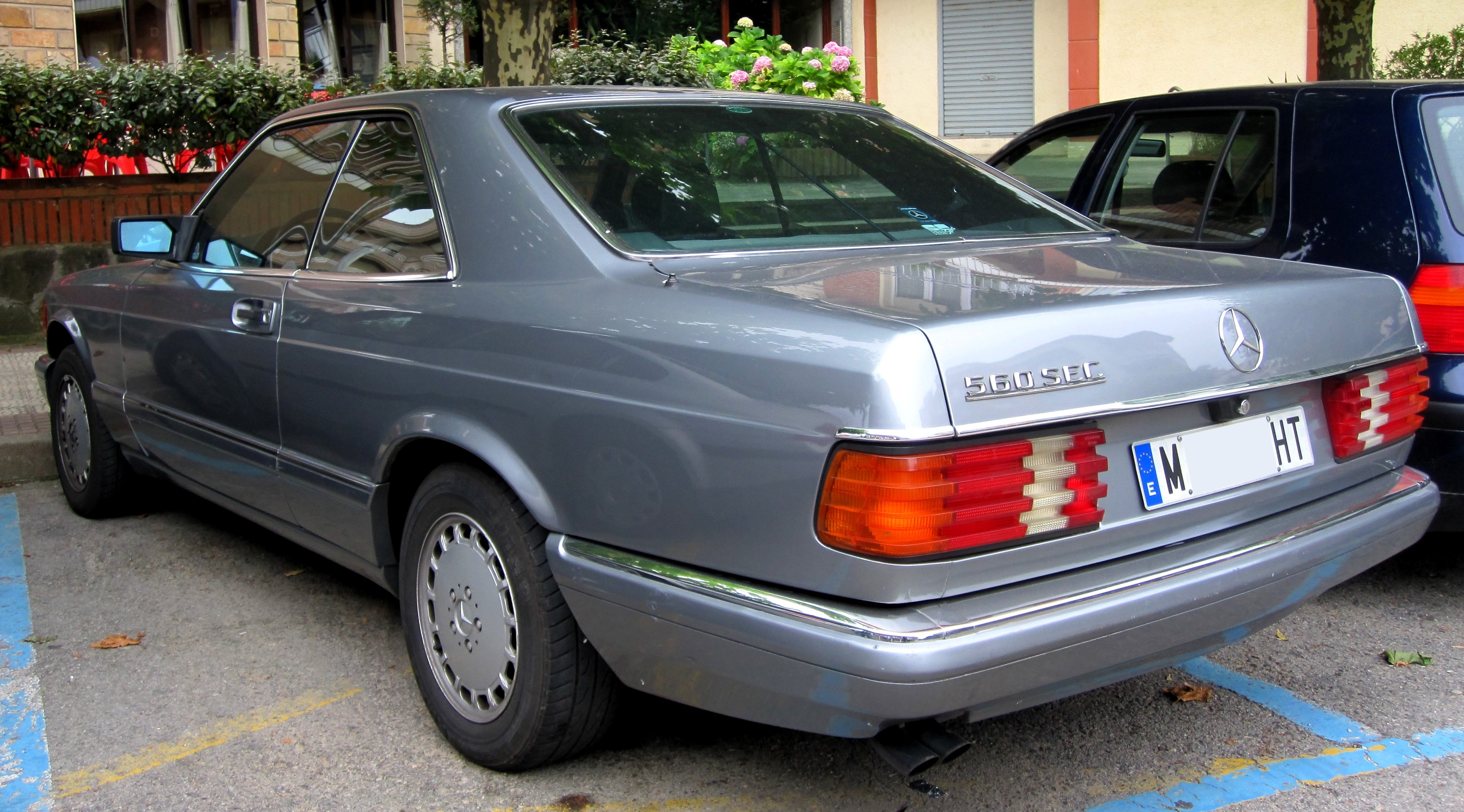
Facelift Mercedes-Benz C126 SEC (coupé)

The pre-facelift model range (1979–1985 for sedan/saloon and 1982–1985 for coupé) included the 280 S/SE/SEL, 300 SD (North American market only), 380 SE/SEL/SEC, and 500 SE/SEL/SEC. The revised second series (1986–1991) with petrol engines included 260 SE, 300 SE/SEL, 420 SE/SEL/SEC, 500 SE/SEL/SEC, and 560 SE/SEL/SEC. The updated version of the diesel model, 300 SDL, was exclusive to the North American market (the first time the S-Class with diesel engine was offered in long wheelbase) and then the 350 SD/SDL (the first diesel S-Class to be available in both wheelbase lengths).

=== Safety ===
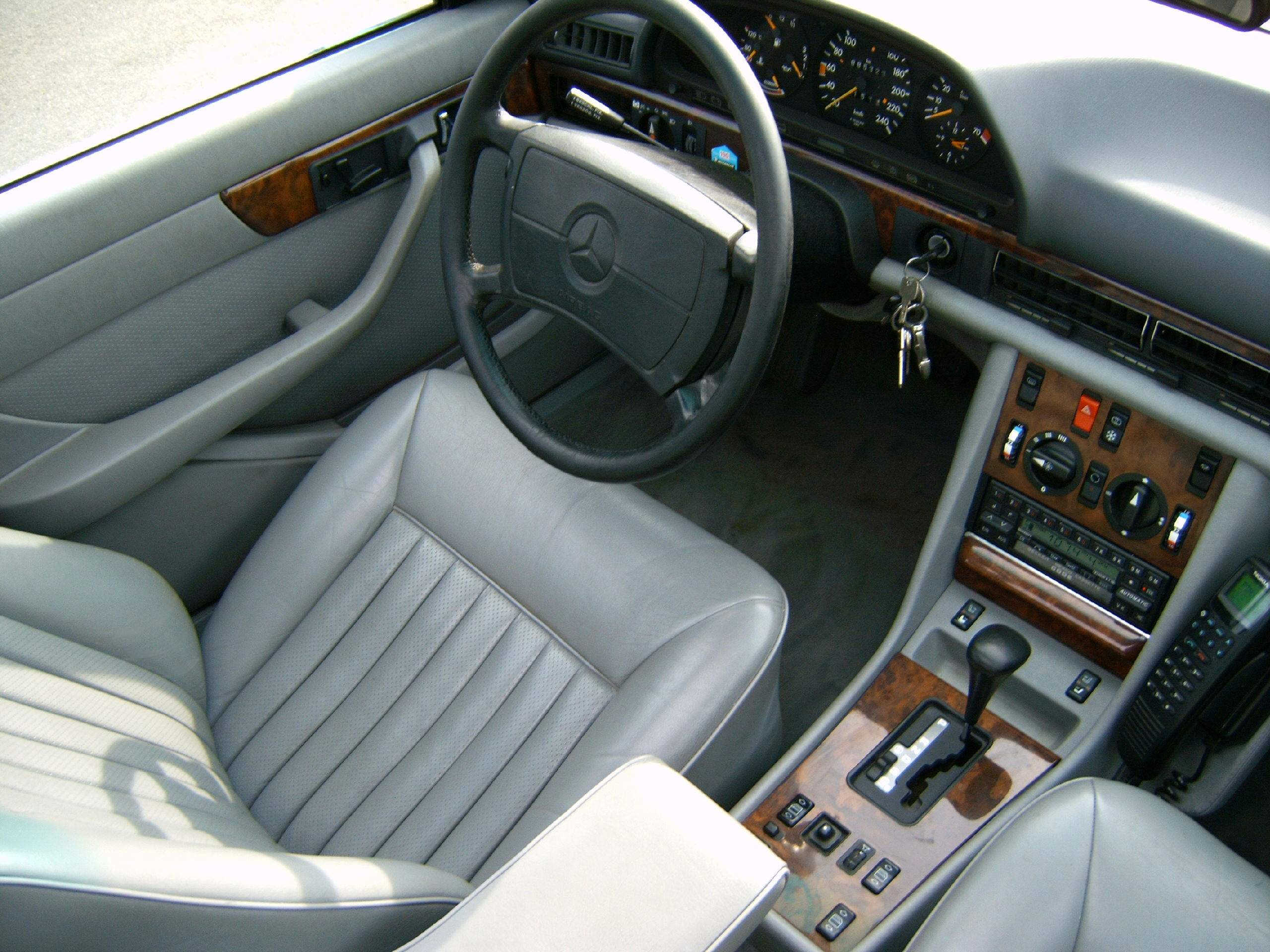
Late 500 SEL with airbag, leather seats, and Burlwood interior wood trim. Left hand drive.

- Use of high-strength low-alloy (HSLA) sheet in its construction to reduce the weight without compromising the structural strength and integrity.
- Anti-lock braking system (ABS) (first appeared in its predecessor, the W116). It was an optional extra for all models and engines until late December of 1984 when it was made standard for the V8 models. Anti-lock braking system (ABS) became standard equipment in September of 1986 for the 260 SE, 300 SE and 300 SEL. Anti-lock braking system (ABS) was standard in the U.S spec 300 SDL, 350 SD and 350 SDL.
- Seat Belt Pretensioners enabled all seat belts (with exception of rear centre shoulder belt on sedan/saloon) to tighten when the car sensed conditions that could lead to an accident such as sudden, forceful braking or sudden deceleration during the collision.
- Crumple zones front and rear which absorbed impact energies, reducing passenger injury.
- Fluted taillamps, the design pioneered on the R107/C107, was carried over. The fluted design maintains the visibility of taillamps when the dirt accumulates on the outer edges.
- Airbags The driver's side airbag was introduced in 1981 as an extra-cost option for all models and engines. The consumers could either choose driver's airbag only or driver's and passenger's airbags. For the US market, the driver's side airbag became standard for the 1985 model year onwards. From September 1987 on, the passenger's side front airbag were added as extra-cost option for the 1988 model year. The passenger's front airbag was an extra cost option until 1989 when it became standard for models with V8 engines only and 1991 for the rest of model range.
- Traction control system (TCS), also known as Acceleration Slip Regulation (ASR), to prevent wheelspin (a Mercedes-Benz first). This feature was available on European models only from 1989 and 1991 and on North American models (560 SEL and 560 SEC) for 1991 only.
- A third brake lamp in the centre of rear windscreen was federally mandated in the United States from 1986 model year on. In some markets, it was offered as standard or extra-cost option.

=== Comfort and convenience ===
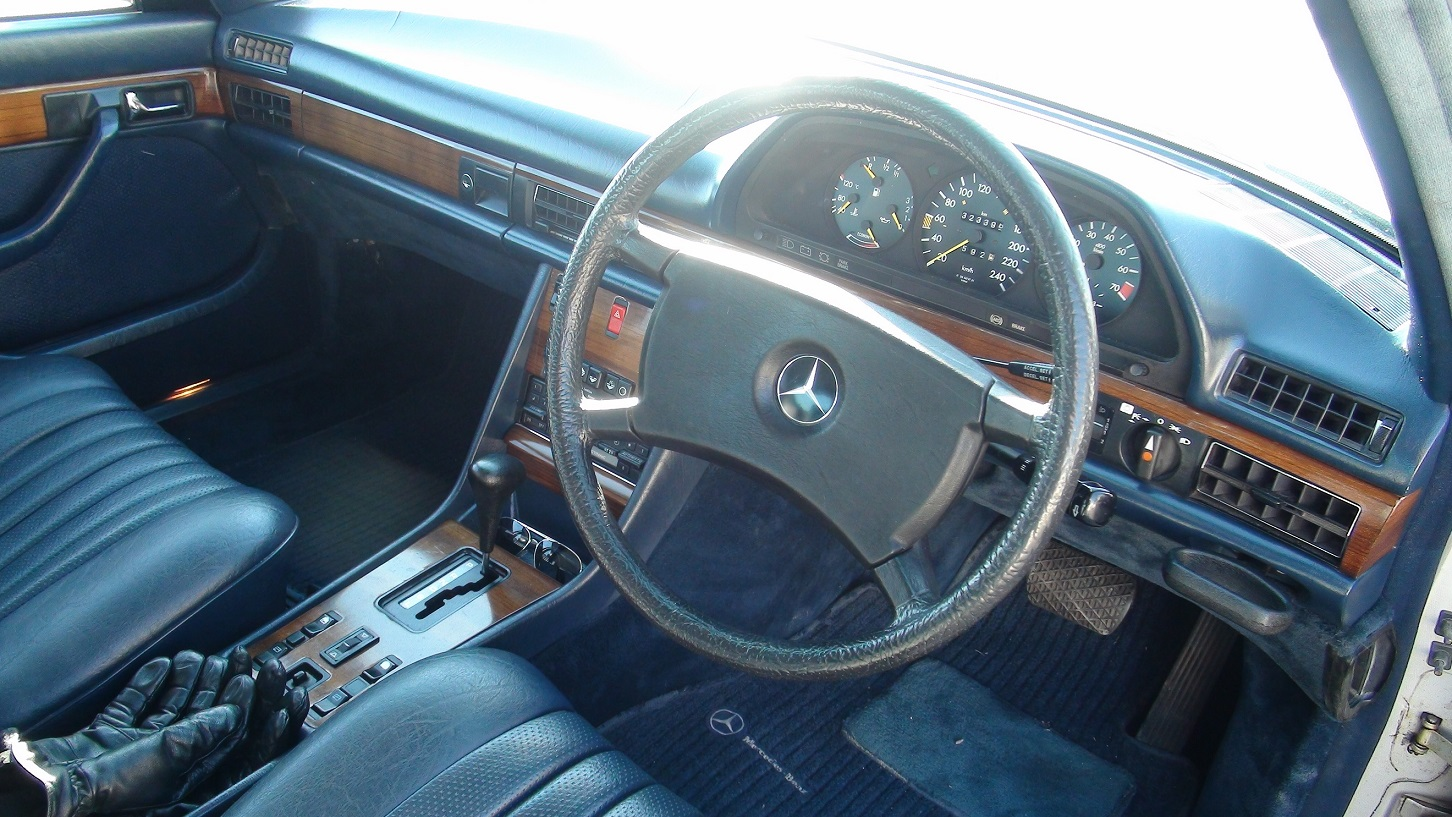
Early 280 S/SE/SEL without airbag, with automatic transmission, MB-Tex seats, and Zebrano interior wood trim. Right hand drive.

- Courtesy lights on the underside of the doors, to enable the occupant to see the ground when exiting the vehicle at night.
- Rear reading lamps were fitted to the C-pillar enabling rear passengers to read or work at night without distracting the driver. Extra cost options for the rear seat passengers were: individually adjusted seat heaters (never offered in coupé models during its entire production run); bench seat that can move forward and back electrically by 10 cm (long wheelbase models only); foot rests; from 1987 on, rear windscreen window shades that are electrically raised and lowered by switch on centre console; and the back of front seats are contoured as to give more legroom.
- From 1979 to 1984, the driver and front passenger seat heaters were separate extra-cost options. From 1985 to 1991, both driver and front passenger seat heaters were offered as a single extra-cost option.
- Beginning with 1985 model year, the rear individual seats and centre console as appeared in coupé model could be fitted to the long wheelbase models if the owner desires, giving the car a 2+2 seating format. The individual seat is electrically adjustable by moving forward and back only.
- An optional fully automatic climate control system that used an interior temperature sensor to more accurately climatise the cabin. This sensor was mounted overhead (near the sunroof switch) so that when the roof was open, the sensor would detect cool air-flow and call upon the system to adjust heat flow accordingly.
- Exterior temperature sensor with LCD set in main instrument console below the speedometer to inform the driver of exterior conditions. This was delineated in Fahrenheit for US-market cars and in Celsius for the rest of the world.
- Due to the B-pillar moving further back in the coupé models with longer doors, Mercedes-Benz developed the world's first seat belt presenters. When the doors are closed and the motor started, the presenters extend the shoulder anchor points forward to the driver and front passenger by about 30 cm. This facilitates easier reach and grab of seat belts. Once the seat belts are anchored or after 30 seconds, the presenters descended back into the B-pillar.
- W126 premiered the power seat control, a first for Mercedes-Benz. Instead of placing the toggle or button switches with same shapes in the hard to reach or see areas, Mercedes-Benz developed the haptic switches in shape of a seat: one switch resembling the seat back for adjusting the seat back; another switch resembling the seat for moving the seat forward and back as well as raising and lowering. The two memory function buttons allow the front occupants to set and select their preferred positions accordingly. After the 17-year patent expired, this design was widely copied by other manufacturers in the late 1990s. Another first for Mercedes-Benz is an electrically adjustable steering column that extends and contracts by toggle switch underneath the steering column. The steering column position can be stored in the driver's side memory function along with the preferred seat position.
- W126 was the first car from Mercedes-Benz to have the theft deterrent system as an option installed at the factory. EDW (Einbruch-Diebstahl-Warnanlage, break-in theft alarm system) can emit an alarm sound and immobilise several components (radio, brakes, ignition lock, and a few others) if the car was being towed away or if any of hood/bonnet, trunk/boot, doors were forcibly opened. From 1984 on for the models with central locking system, the owner can turn the front door lock further to bolt the doors as to make them very difficult to be forcibly opened. The owner can order the separate bolt system for the trunk/bolt, making it equally difficult to pry the trunk/boot open. They require a special key with red dot.

=== Drivetrain technologies ===
The four-speed 4G-Tronic transmission had a new topographical sensor that improved the drivability by monitoring the vehicle's position (flat surface, incline, or decline) and the position of throttle pedal. This prevents the unintended acceleration when coasting downhill without the frequent braking to maintain the speed. The Second Series has a "hill-hold" feature that prevents the vehicle from rolling back suddenly when disengaging the brake and engaging the throttle pedals at the steep incline. The transmission in European models has a S/W switch to allow the start in either first (Standard) or second (Winter) gear respectively. The "Second Series" changed the S/W to S/E for Economy. The topographical sensor also offers a better driving experience with cruise control by adjusting the throttle smoothly and automatically without sudden lurching or decelerating when maintaining the desired speed.

The W126 carried forward the self-leveling hydropneumatic suspension of the W116 450 SEL 6.9 model. Like the W116 and W123, the rear-wheel hydropneumatic suspension system was offered in W126 as an option. The updated version was called HPF II (short for Hydropneumatische Federung) was available from 1981 to 1985 (on the 380 SEL and 500 SEL) and very briefly on the 500 SE in 1985. The self-levelling technology responds to changes in weight distribution (passengers, luggage, fuel, etc.) and was therefore less applicable in shorter wheelbase models.

For the "Second Series" (1986-1991), the hydropneumatic suspension was heavily redesigned and named HPF III. The HPF III automatically lowers the chassis by 24 mm when the vehicle is travelled at least 120 km/h for improved aerodynamic flow and better high speed stability. The system adjusts the damping rate from soft to hard based on speed and road condition for extra comfort and better drivability. Additionally, the driver can select to raise the car by 35 mm if travelling over coarse-surfaced road (only up to 80 km/h). From 1986 to 1990, the HPF III option was available in 420 SEL, 500 SEL, 560 SE, and 560 SEL. For the final year of production, HPF III was available in longer wheelbase only (420 SEL, 500 SEL, and 560 SEL). Due to its complexity and tendency to fail catastrophically, HPF III was very difficult to service and was often, at the owner's request, removed and replaced with coil springs and shock absorbers from models without hydropneumatic suspension system.

At the 1983 IAA, Mercedes-Benz introduced Reiserechner ("Trip calculator"), its first trip computer option, in the W126 for the 1984 model year. The trip computer has a rectangular control panel on the centre console between the power window switches and the round information panel in the instrument clusters. The control panel features a series of buttons which feature haptic touch to allow the driver to feel his way around the control buttons without taking his eyes off the road. A panel occupies the gauge cluster formerly used by tachometer, which moved to the left gauge cluster, sharing with oil, fuel, and temperature gauges. The information panel contains a large horizontal LCD in the middle. The option was dropped from the W126 a few years later due to the complexity of configuring the trip computer, requiring an accompanying 18-page instruction handbook to understand its operation, and due to the frequent failure of its control panel buttons.

== Engines ==
=== First series (1979–1985) ===
At the introduction in September 1979, the 2.7-litre DOHC six-cylinder inline M110 engine from the 280 S/SE/SEL was carried over from the W116. The revised M116/M117 V8 engines had a significant innovation: an aluminium block without iron sleeves, as found in the competitors' engines. Mercedes-Benz developed a special silicon coating as to harden the cylinder liners against excessive wear and tear. The V8 engines were offered in two sizes: 3.8 litres (M116) and 5 litres (M117). The M116 V8 engine had a single timing chain, while the M117 V8 engine had double timing chains. The frequent mechanical failure of the single timing chain in the M116 was addressed in 1982 by switching to double timing chains from the M117 V8 engine.

The smaller of the two V8 engines was initially the only one offered in the US market, to help meet Corporate Average Fuel Economy (CAFE) requirements. The 380 SEL received a poor customer perception in the United States as being severely underpowered and due to mechanical issues with the single timing chain. The 380 SEL for the US market took 11 seconds to reach 60 mph (97 km/h) from standstill and had top speed of 117 mph (188 km/h). The severe performance shortcoming of W126 with V8 engine was addressed by introducing more powerful 500SEL/SEC in 1984.

The S-Class coupé was fitted with V8 engines only for the first time.

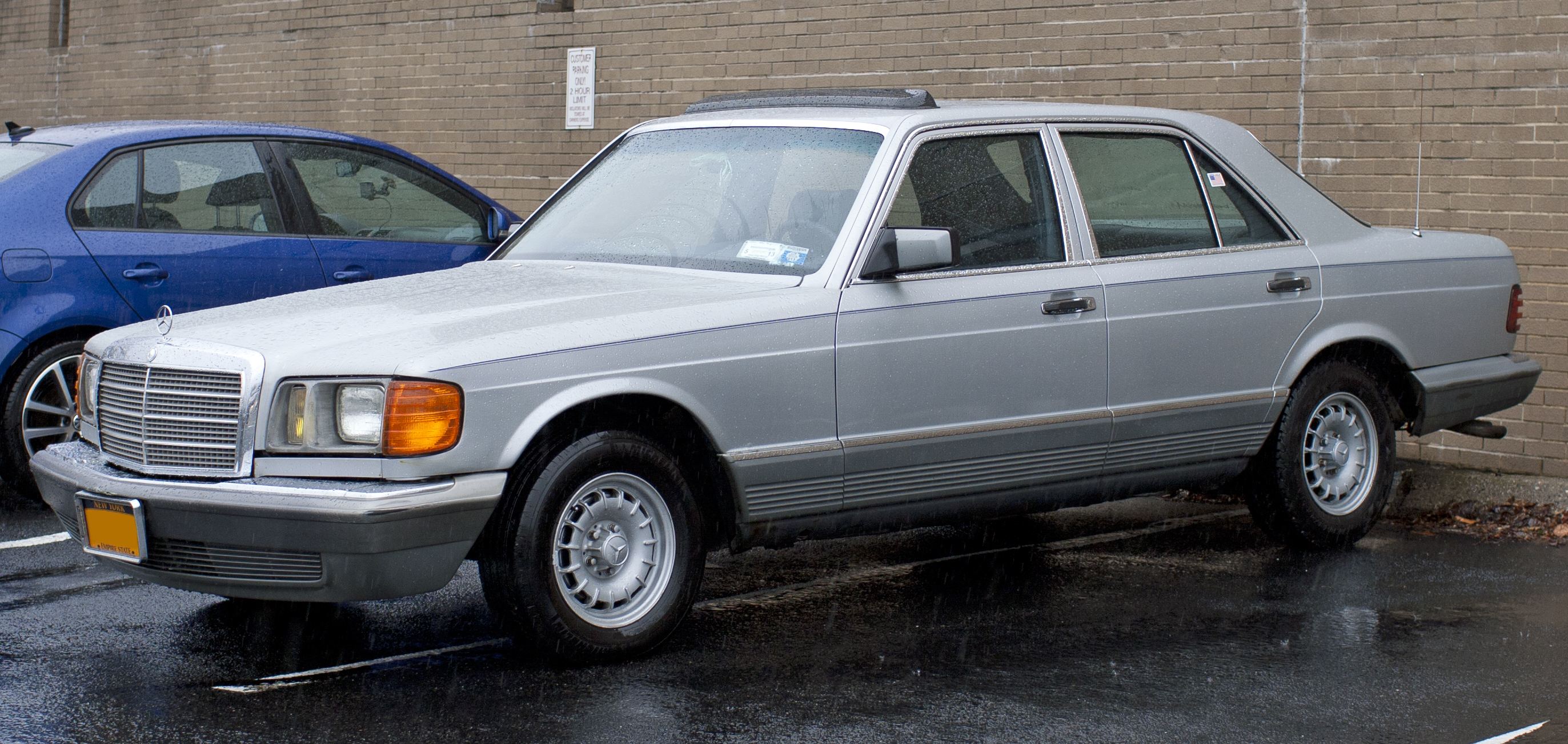
1983 Mercedes 300SD with the OM617 Turbodiesel engine

The 3-litre five-cylinder inline OM617 diesel engine was carried over from the W116 with the same performance. The diesel engines were again never offered in the markets outside of the United States and Canada. This discrepancy was not addressed until 1994 when the W140 S 350 Turbodiesel was introduced in Europe.

In 1981, Mercedes-Benz introduced the Energiekonzept ("Energy Concept") programme in reducing the fuel consumption. This programme revised the combustion chambers and piston heads with lower compression ratio in the V8 engines. This revision caused a further drop in engine performance.

=== Second series (1986–1991) ===
For the second series, introduced in September 1985, the engine range was extensively revised with new six-cylinder inline engines and enlarged V8 engines. Only the 5-litre M117 V8 was carried over from the first series, expanding the V8 engine range to three.

The revised engine range focused more on reducing pollution and fuel consumption even further. For the first time, the customers outside US and Canadian markets could choose the models with or without catalysators. The models without catalysators can be retrofitted with catalysators at later date if the customers choose to: this retrofit method is called RÜF (Rückrüstfahrzeug — loosely translated as retrofit vehicle). The RÜF models had a mechanical switch in the engine bay to be operated by owners for running on lead or lead-free fuels, a necessary feature for driving outside Germany or in areas within Germany where the lead-free fuel wasn't widespread yet. In 1990, all engines were fitted with catalysators only and the mechanical switch eliminated.

The new six-cylinder inline M103 engine had a single overhead camshaft and electronic-mechanical fuel injection and was available in two sizes: 2.6 and 3 litres. The carburetted engine fitted to the 280 S was eliminated, marking the end of carburetted engines for the S-Class, and replaced with fuel-injected engines for the 260 SE and 300 SE/SEL.

For the V8 engines, the M116 was bored out to 4.2 litres from 3.8 litres for the 420 SE/SEL/SEC while the 5-litre V8 for 500 SE/SEL/SEC was carried over. A new 5.5 litre engine was introduced for the 560 SE/SEL/SEC which was accomplished by stroking the 5-litre M117 engine with a new crankshaft. The V8 engines were fitted with new electronic ignition system and Bosch KE-Jetronic electronic-mechanical fuel injection system, first appeared in W201 190E. The revised V8 engines except 5-litre version had slight performance increase.

The most powerful engine ever fitted to the W126 S-Class was a 5.5-litre V8, putting out 221 kW (300 PS, 296 bhp). This engine, classified as ECE-Variante (German name), has a higher compression ratio of 10:1 and cannot be retrofitted with a catalysator at a later date. In September 1986, the ECE-Variante was superseded by the RÜF-Variante, which retains the same horsepower figure without catalysator and lower figure if retrofitted with a catalysator at a later date. In 1990, the power of the 560 SEL was reduced to 200 kW (272 PS; 268 bhp).

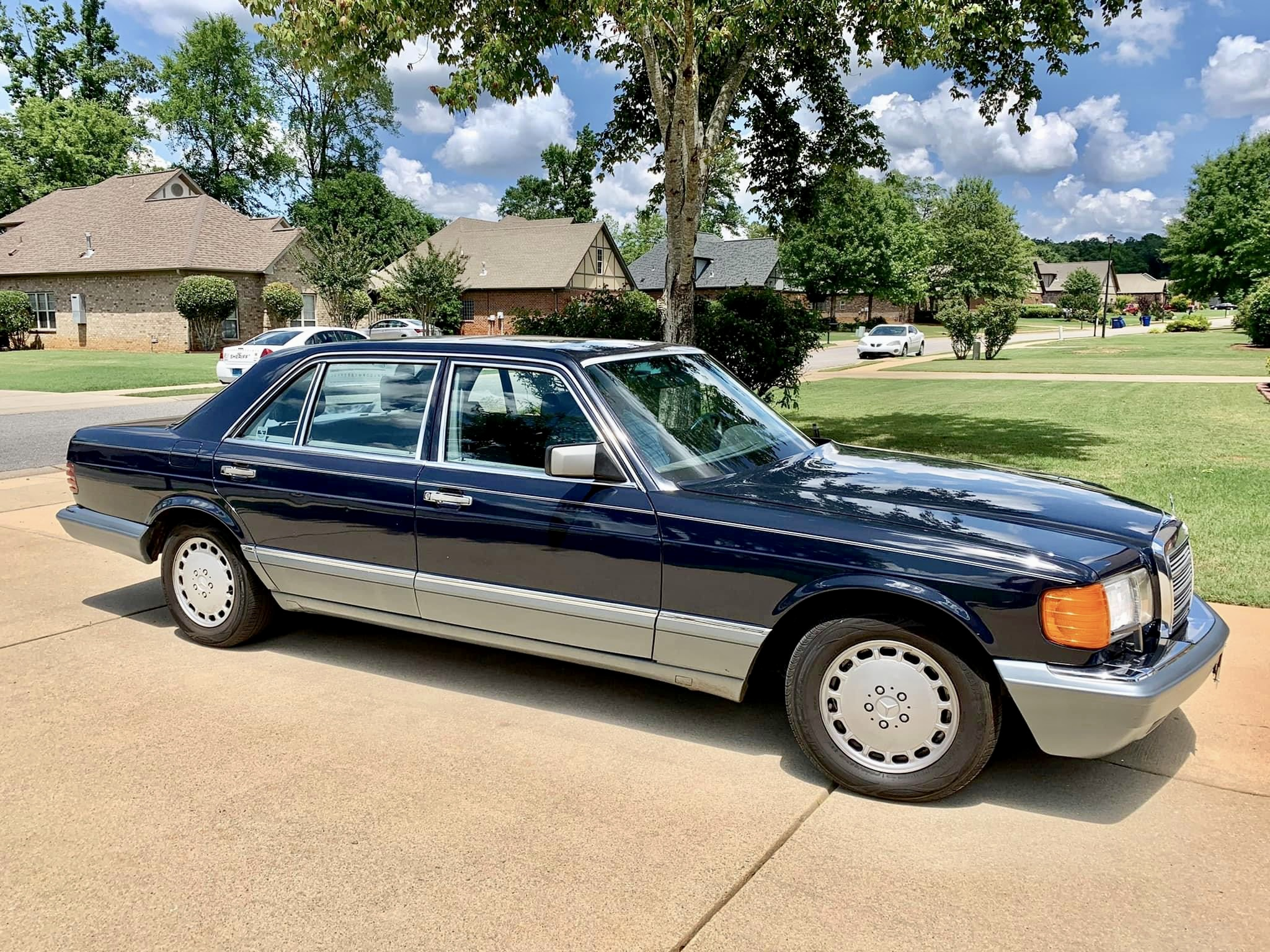
1986 Mercedes 300SDL with the OM603 Turbodiesel engine

For the US and Canadian markets, a new 3-litre six-cylinder inline OM603 diesel engine was introduced, replacing the five-cylinder engine with the same displacement. It was the first six-cylinder passenger diesel engine by Mercedes-Benz. This new engine was available in the long wheelbase version only, 300 SDL, for the first time. For California, the diesel engines were fitted with a diesel particulate filter, a world's first for a passenger car. The new engine had an ill-gotten reputation for higher percentage of aluminium cylinder head failure due to poor placement of the diesel particulate filter and due to the erosion of the head gasket, allowing cooling fluid to seep into the cylinders. However, they failed to perform as designed and were removed from the engines. For 1988, the engine was revised to correct the issues and move the particulate filter further away from the engine.

In 1990, the same engine was bored out to 3.5 litres as to compensate for reduced performance due to stricter emission regulations. The bored out 3.5-litre version did not have any of the aforementioned problems but did suffer its own issues. Due to the nature of the displacement increase the wider pistons were known to rock in their bore, eroding the piston rings, causing the cylinders to oval, and potentially leading to bent connecting rods. Mercedes-Benz addressed the issue as being caused by inadequate Cetane ratings in North American fuel. Later versions of the bored OM603 were updated with stronger connecting rods. The 3.5-litre version was available in both standard and long wheelbases (350 SD and 350 SDL) for the first time in the S-Class.

== Transmissions ==
=== First series (1979–1985) ===
The automatic transmission 4G-Tronic had four speeds with direct drive in the fourth gear for the entire run from 1979 to 1991.

The 280 S/SE/SEL had 4-speed manual transmission as standard with 5-speed manual and 4-speed automatic transmissions as extra-cost options. Manual transmission was not fitted to the V8 engines.

U.S. models, including the 300 SD Turbodiesel, had automatic transmission as sole transmission choice.

=== Second series (1985–1991) ===
From 1986 onward, the automatic transmission 4G-Tronic was revised to include the option of selecting S (Standard) and E (Economy) shifting points.

The models 260 SE and 300 SE/SEL were fitted with the standard 5-speed manual and optional extra-cost 4-speed automatic transmissions. For one year from September 1986 to June 1987, the extra cost automatic transmission option wasn't offered for the 260 SE and 300 SE. Manual transmission was not fitted to the V8 engines.

U.S. models had the automatic transmission as the sole transmission choice.

== U.S. grey market ==
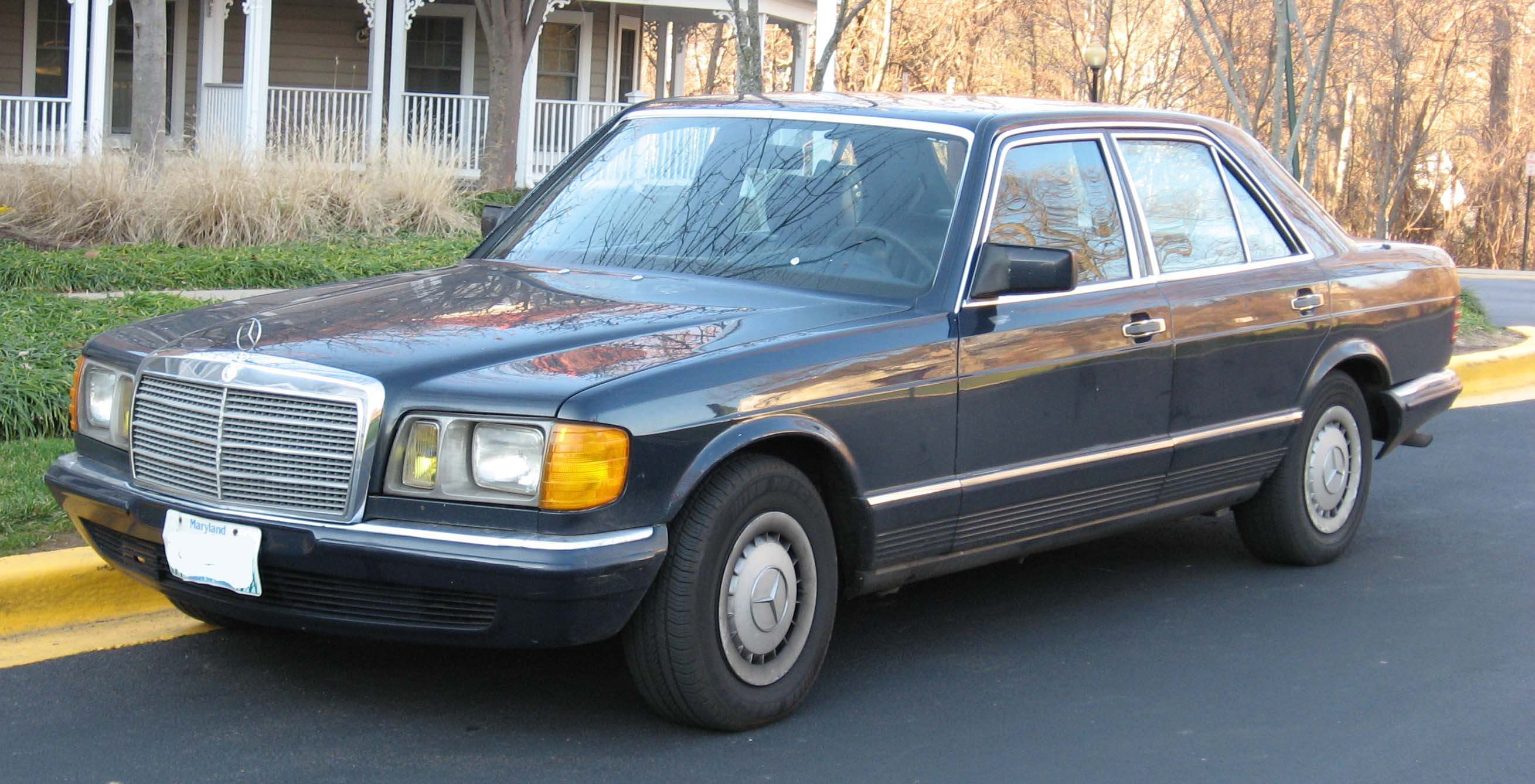
Grey-market Mercedes-Benz 500 SE

When the W126 was introduced in the United States in September 1980, Mercedes-Benz only offered the smaller 3.8-litre V8 engine to avoid the gas guzzler penalty under Corporate Average Fuel Economy (CAFE) regulations. However, American consumers found the 380 SEL severely underpowered with slow acceleration (0–60 mph in 11 seconds) and a lower top speed of 117 mph (188 km/h).

As the fear of oil crisis waned in 1982, American consumers demanded the more powerful S-Class models, and grey importers brought the S-Class with 5-litre V8 engines to the United States and modified them to meet US FMVSS and EPA regulations. The 280 S/SE/SEL with smaller six-cylinder inline engines were also imported, offering significant savings over the V8 models. The W126 was a major part of this parallel market, with 22,000 imported in a segment that hit 66,900 cars in 1985, the biggest year for grey imports.

Consequently, Mercedes-Benz added the 500 SEL/500 SEC to the American model range for 1984 model year to counter the grey imports while the 3.8-litre V8 engine remained in 380 SE (standard wheelbase only) and 380 SL.

In 1988, an intense lobbying effort by Mercedes-Benz and other foreign manufacturers led U.S. Congress to eliminate this consumer option and revise the rules for registered importers.

== Special variants ==
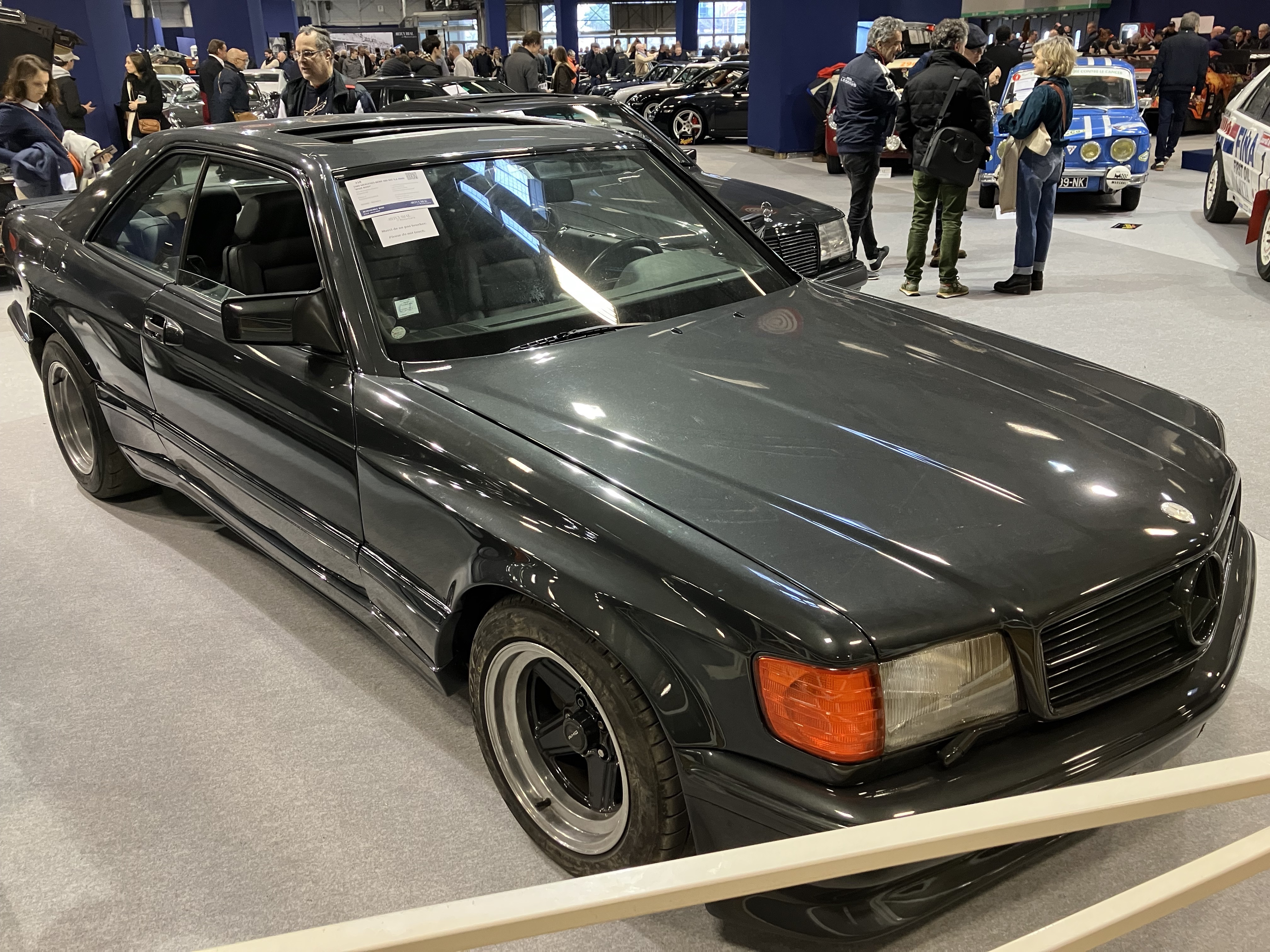
1989 Mercedes-Benz 560 SEC 5.6 AMG 'Wide Body'

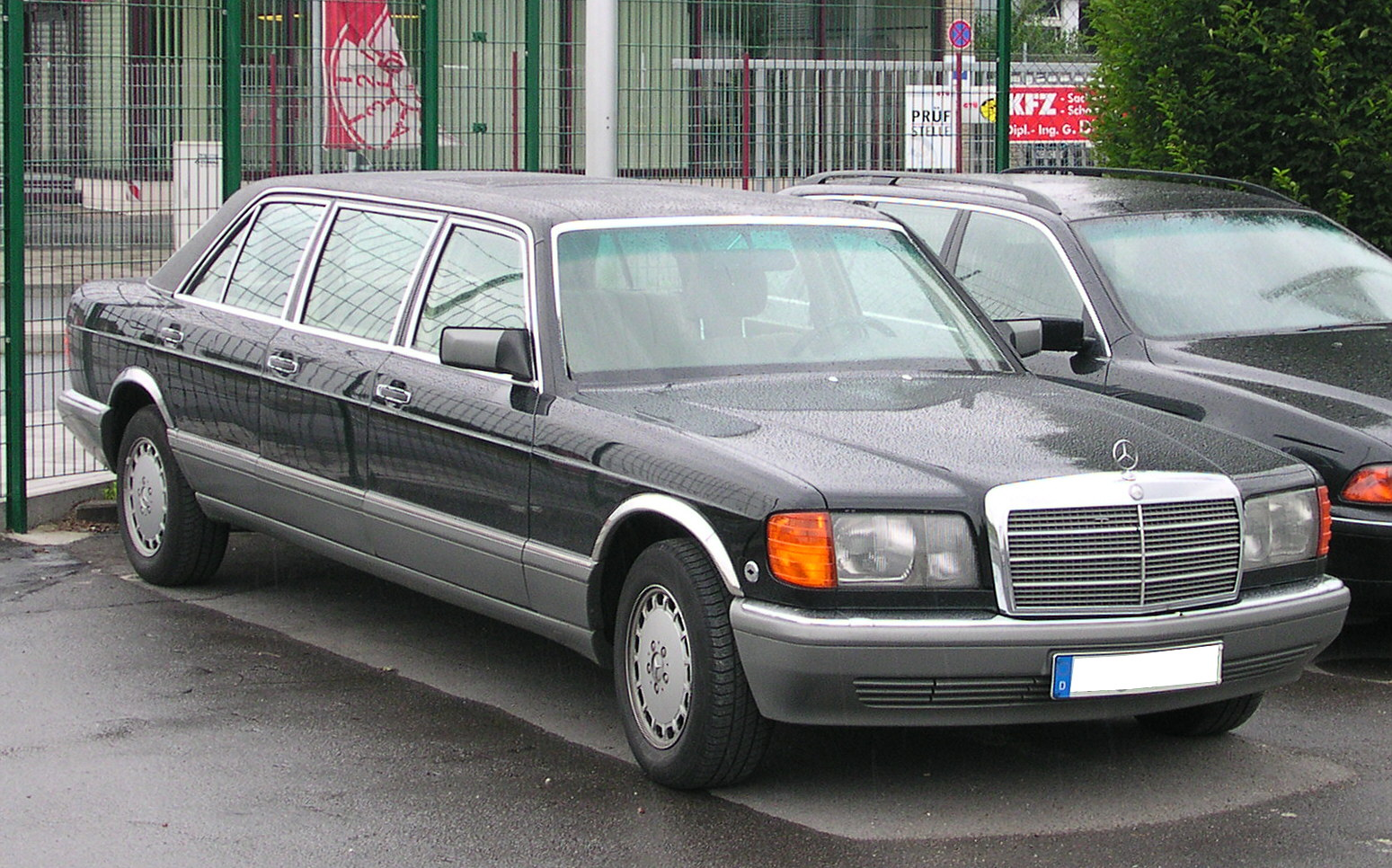
Mercedes-Benz W126 six-door stretch limousine

Although it had not yet merged with Mercedes-Benz, "pre-merger" AMG offered body kits for all W126 models, as well as a "wide body" kit for the coupé. The "wide body" cars were fitted with distinctive AMG-designed front and rear fenders and door panels that allowed much wider wheels and tires to be fitted. AMG also offered engine modifications with displacements of 5, 5.5, and 6 litres. The most famous and rarest was the DOHC 6-litre engine, based on the original 117.968 engine. Some of options offered were Gleason Torsen differential in various ratios, manual transmission (extremely rare), and various TV/radio consoles.

- Trasco Bremen offered a stretch limousine version called the "1000 SEL".
- A variety of coachbuilders offered convertibles based on the SEC (coupé) model. Caruna of Switzerland also offered a full four-door convertible based on the SEL (but using the SE's shorter rear doors). One of these (a blue one) still belongs to the Dutch royal family, who use it at their resort in Porto Ercole, Italy.
- A coachbuilder, Caro International, built an estate/station wagon version of W126 S-Class called 560 TEL.
- Guard, specially modified W126 S-Class models were produced for the transport of dignitaries and world leaders. Among the modifications made included a wheelbase stretch, bulletproof glass, and armored body panels.

== Racing ==
Two AMG-modified 500 SEC cars raced at the 1989 24 Hours of Spa. Both cars failed to finish, with one suffering gearbox issues, while the other had issues with the rear axle.

== Awards ==
- The 300 SD received the 1981 Motor Trend Import Car of the Year.
- The 380 SE was the Wheels Magazine Car of the Year in 1981.
- The W126 was awarded the U.S. Highway Loss Data Institute "Safest Passenger Car of the Year" in 1988 and 1989.
- The W126 was the third-ranked luxury vehicle in J.D. Power's 1990 Initial Quality Survey (IQS).
- From 1987 to 1990, Mercedes received the highest customer ratings in the J.D. Power Sales Satisfaction Index.

== Legacy ==
The W126 series was the highest volume S-Class on record in terms of production.

A limited number of W126 continued to be produced in South Africa until 1993(?), two years after the introduction of W140 S-Class. No figures were given for South African production. Nelson Mandela was given a commemorative model, a red 1990 500 SE.

Three armoured 560 SEL ordered by Saddam Hussein had a series of pipes that shot flames out of the sides.

== Technical data ==
First Series, 1979-1985
Model	Chassis	Years	Config- uration	Dis- place- ment [cc]	Fuel Delivery	Power	Torque	Curb Weight [kg]	0–100 km/h (0–62 mph) [seconds]	Top Speed	Fuel Consumption	Units
Petrol Engines
280 S	W126.021	09/1979 – 08/1985	M 110.924; Inline 6	2746	Two-stage twin-barrel downdraught carburetor (Solex 4A1)	115 kW (156 PS; 154 bhp)	223 N⋅m (164 lb⋅ft)	1560	11	200 km/h (124 mph)	15.1 L/100 km (15.6 mpg_{‑US})	42,996
280 SE	W126.022	09/1979 – 08/1985	M 110.989; Inline 6	2746	Mechanical continuous multi-point injection (Bosch K-Jetronic)	136 kW (185 PS; 182 bhp)	240 N⋅m (177 lb⋅ft)	1560	10	210 km/h (130 mph)	15.6 L/100 km (15.1 mpg_{‑US})	133,955
280 SEL	W126.023	09/1979 – 08/1985	M 110.989; Inline 6	2746	Mechanical continuous multi-point injection (Bosch K-Jetronic)	136 kW (185 PS; 182 bhp)	240 N⋅m (177 lb⋅ft)	1590	10	210 km/h (130 mph)	15.6 L/100 km (15.1 mpg_{‑US})	20,655
380 SE	W126.032	09/1979 – 08/1981	3818: M 116.961; 3839: M 116.963; V8	3818	Mechanical continuous multi-point injection (Bosch K-Jetronic)	160 kW (218 PS; 215 bhp)	305 N⋅m (225 lb⋅ft)	1595	9.8	210 km/h (130 mph)	17.5 L/100 km (13.4 mpg_{‑US})	58,239
380 SE	W126.032	09/1981 – 08/1985	3818: M 116.961; 3839: M 116.963; V8	3839	Mechanical continuous multi-point injection (Bosch K-Jetronic)	150 kW (204 PS; 201 bhp)	315 N⋅m (232 lb⋅ft)	1595	9.6	210 km/h (130 mph)	17.5 L/100 km (13.4 mpg_{‑US})	58,239
380 SEL	W126.033	09/1979 – 08/1981	3818: M 116.961; 3839: M 116.963; V8	3818	Mechanical continuous multi-point injection (Bosch K-Jetronic)	160 kW (218 PS; 215 bhp)	305 N⋅m (225 lb⋅ft)	1625	9.8	215 km/h (134 mph)	17.5 L/100 km (13.4 mpg_{‑US})	27,014
380 SEL	W126.033	09/1981 – 08/1985	3818: M 116.961; 3839: M 116.963; V8	3839	Mechanical continuous multi-point injection (Bosch K-Jetronic)	150 kW (204 PS; 201 bhp)	315 N⋅m (232 lb⋅ft)	1625	9.6	205 km/h (127 mph)	17.5 L/100 km (13.4 mpg_{‑US})	27,014
380 SEC	W126.043	09/1981 – 08/1985	3818: M 116.961; 3839: M 116.963; V8	3839	Mechanical continuous multi-point injection (Bosch K-Jetronic)	150 kW (204 PS; 201 bhp)	315 N⋅m (232 lb⋅ft)	1585	9.6	210 km/h (130 mph)	17.5 L/100 km (13.4 mpg_{‑US})	11,267
500 SE	W126.036	09/1979 – 08/1981	M 117.963; V8	4973	Mechanical continuous multi-point injection (Bosch K-Jetronic)	177 kW (241 PS; 237 bhp)	402 N⋅m (296 lb⋅ft)	1620	8.1	210 km/h (130 mph)	18.5 L/100 km (12.7 mpg_{‑US})	33,418 (1979 – 1991)
500 SE	W126.036	09/1981 – 08/1985	M 117.963; V8	4973	Mechanical continuous multi-point injection (Bosch K-Jetronic)	170 kW (231 PS; 228 bhp)	405 N⋅m (299 lb⋅ft)	1620	8.0	210 km/h (130 mph)	18.5 L/100 km (12.7 mpg_{‑US})	33,418 (1979 – 1991)
500 SEL	W126.037	09/1979 – 08/1981	M 117.963; V8	4973	Mechanical continuous multi-point injection (Bosch K-Jetronic)	177 kW (241 PS; 237 bhp)	402 N⋅m (296 lb⋅ft)	1650	8.1	215 km/h (134 mph)	18.5 L/100 km (12.7 mpg_{‑US})	72,733 (1979 – 1991)
500 SEL	W126.037	09/1981 – 08/1985	M 117.963; V8	4973	Mechanical continuous multi-point injection (Bosch K-Jetronic)	170 kW (231 PS; 228 bhp)	405 N⋅m (299 lb⋅ft)	1650	8.0	205 km/h (127 mph)	18.5 L/100 km (12.7 mpg_{‑US})	72,733 (1979 – 1991)
500 SEC	W126.044	09/1981 – 08/1985	M 117.963; V8	4973	Mechanical continuous multi-point injection (Bosch K-Jetronic)	170 kW (231 PS; 228 bhp)	405 N⋅m (299 lb⋅ft)	1610	8.0	210 km/h (130 mph)	18.5 L/100 km (12.7 mpg_{‑US})	30,184 (1981 - 1991)
Diesel Engines (US, Canada, and Japan Only)
300 SD	W126.120	09/1979 – 10/1982	OM 617.951; Inline 5	2998	Precombustion chamber injection (Bosch five-piston inline injection pump)	89 kW (121 PS; 119 bhp)	250 N⋅m (184 lb⋅ft)	1620	15.2	175 km/h (109 mph)	12.4 L/100 km (19.0 mpg_{‑US})	78,725
300 SD	W126.120	10/1982 – 08/1985	OM 617.951; Inline 5	2998	Precombustion chamber injection (Bosch five-piston inline injection pump)	92 kW (125 PS; 123 bhp)	250 N⋅m (184 lb⋅ft)	1620	15.2	175 km/h (109 mph)	12.4 L/100 km (19.0 mpg_{‑US})	78,725

Second Series, 1986-1991
Model	Chassis	Years	Config- uration	Dis- place- ment [cc]	Fuel Delivery	Power	Torque	Curb Weight [kg]	0–100 km/h (0–62 mph) [seconds]	Top Speed	Fuel Consumption	Units
Petrol Engines (Second Series, 1986 – 1991)
260 SE	W126.020	09/1985 – 02/1989	M 103.940; Inline 6	2599	Mechanical continuous multi-point injection with electronic control (Bosch KE-Jetronic)	124 kW (169 PS; 166 bhp) RÜF	228 N⋅m (168 lb⋅ft) RÜF	1570	10.5	205 km/h (127 mph)	10.3–10.7 L/100 km (23–22 mpg_{‑US})	20,836
260 SE	W126.020	09/1985 – 10/1991	M 103.940; Inline 6	2599	Mechanical continuous multi-point injection with electronic control (Bosch KE-Jetronic)	118 kW (160 PS; 158 bhp) CAT	220 N⋅m (162 lb⋅ft) CAT	1570	11	200 km/h (124 mph)	10.3–10.7 L/100 km (23–22 mpg_{‑US})	20,836
300 SE	W126.024	09/1985 – 02/1989	M 103.980; Inline 6	2962	Mechanical continuous multi-point injection with electronic control (Bosch KE-Jetronic)	138 kW (188 PS; 185 bhp) RÜF	260 N⋅m (192 lb⋅ft) RÜF	1570	9.1	205 km/h (127 mph)	10.3–10.7 L/100 km (23–22 mpg_{‑US})	105,422
300 SE	W126.024	09/1985 – 10/1991	M 103.980; Inline 6	2962	Mechanical continuous multi-point injection with electronic control (Bosch KE-Jetronic)	132 kW (179 PS; 177 bhp) CAT	255 N⋅m (188 lb⋅ft) CAT	1570	9.3	200 km/h (124 mph)	10.3–10.7 L/100 km (23–22 mpg_{‑US})	105,422
300 SEL	W126.025	09/1985 – 02/1989	M 103.980; Inline 6	2962	Mechanical continuous multi-point injection with electronic control (Bosch KE-Jetronic)	140 kW (190 PS; 188 bhp) RÜF	260 N⋅m (192 lb⋅ft) RÜF	1590	9.1	205 km/h (127 mph)	10.3–10.7 L/100 km (23–22 mpg_{‑US})	40,956
300 SEL	W126.025	09/1985 – 10/1991	M 103.980; Inline 6	2962	Mechanical continuous multi-point injection with electronic control (Bosch KE-Jetronic)	132 kW (179 PS; 177 bhp) CAT	255 N⋅m (188 lb⋅ft) CAT	1590	9.3	200 km/h (124 mph)	10.3–10.7 L/100 km (23–22 mpg_{‑US})	40,956
420 SE	W126.034	09/1985 – 05/1987	M 116.965; V8	4196	Mechanical continuous multi-point injection with electronic control (Bosch KE-Jetronic)	160 kW (218 PS; 215 bhp) RÜF	330 N⋅m (243 lb⋅ft) RÜF	1620	8.3	218 km/h (135 mph)	11.5–11.9 L/100 km (20.5–19.8 mpg_{‑US})	13,996
420 SE	W126.034	06/1987 – 12/1989	M 116.965; V8	4196	Mechanical continuous multi-point injection with electronic control (Bosch KE-Jetronic)	170 kW (231 PS; 228 bhp) RÜF	335 N⋅m (247 lb⋅ft) RÜF	1620	8.2	220 km/h (137 mph)	11.5–11.9 L/100 km (20.5–19.8 mpg_{‑US})	13,996
420 SE	W126.034	09/1985 – 08/1987	M 116.965; V8	4196	Mechanical continuous multi-point injection with electronic control (Bosch KE-Jetronic)	150 kW (204 PS; 201 bhp) CAT	310 N⋅m (229 lb⋅ft) CAT	1620	8.7	218 km/h (135 mph)	11.5–11.9 L/100 km (20.5–19.8 mpg_{‑US})	13,996
420 SE	W126.034	09/1987 – 10/1991	M 116.965; V8	4196	Mechanical continuous multi-point injection with electronic control (Bosch KE-Jetronic)	165 kW (224 PS; 221 bhp) CAT	325 N⋅m (240 lb⋅ft) CAT	1620	8.5	220 km/h (137 mph)	11.5–11.9 L/100 km (20.5–19.8 mpg_{‑US})	13,996
420 SEL	W126.035	09/1985 – 05/1987	M 116.965; V8	4196	Mechanical continuous multi-point injection with electronic control (Bosch KE-Jetronic)	160 kW (218 PS; 215 bhp) RÜF	330 N⋅m (243 lb⋅ft) RÜF	1650	8.3	218 km/h (135 mph)	11.5–11.9 L/100 km (20.5–19.8 mpg_{‑US})	74,017
420 SEL	W126.035	06/1987 – 12/1989	M 116.965; V8	4196	Mechanical continuous multi-point injection with electronic control (Bosch KE-Jetronic)	170 kW (231 PS; 228 bhp) RÜF	335 N⋅m (247 lb⋅ft) RÜF	1650	8.2	220 km/h (137 mph)	11.5–11.9 L/100 km (20.5–19.8 mpg_{‑US})	74,017
420 SEL	W126.035	09/1985 – 08/1987	M 116.965; V8	4196	Mechanical continuous multi-point injection with electronic control (Bosch KE-Jetronic)	150 kW (204 PS; 201 bhp) CAT	310 N⋅m (229 lb⋅ft) CAT	1650	8.7	218 km/h (135 mph)	11.5–11.9 L/100 km (20.5–19.8 mpg_{‑US})	74,017
420 SEL	W126.035	09/1987 – 10/1991	M 116.965; V8	4196	Mechanical continuous multi-point injection with electronic control (Bosch KE-Jetronic)	165 kW (224 PS; 221 bhp) CAT	325 N⋅m (240 lb⋅ft) CAT	1650	8.5	220 km/h (137 mph)	11.5–11.9 L/100 km (20.5–19.8 mpg_{‑US})	74,017
420 SEL	W126.035	09/1985 – 10/1991	M 116.965; V8	4196	Mechanical continuous multi-point injection with electronic control (Bosch KE-Jetronic)	150 kW (204 PS; 201 bhp) US CAT	339 N⋅m (250 lb⋅ft) US CAT	1650	9.0 (0–60 mph)	N/A	11.5–11.9 L/100 km (20.5–19.8 mpg_{‑US})	74,017
420 SEC	W126.046	09/1985 – 05/1987	M 116.965; V8	4196	Mechanical continuous multi-point injection with electronic control (Bosch KE-Jetronic)	160 kW (218 PS; 215 bhp) RÜF	330 N⋅m (243 lb⋅ft) RÜF	1640	8.3	218 km/h (135 mph)	11.5–11.9 L/100 km (20.5–19.8 mpg_{‑US})	3,680
420 SEC	W126.046	06/1987 – 12/1989	M 116.965; V8	4196	Mechanical continuous multi-point injection with electronic control (Bosch KE-Jetronic)	170 kW (231 PS; 228 bhp) RÜF	335 N⋅m (247 lb⋅ft) RÜF	1640	8.2	220 km/h (137 mph)	11.5–11.9 L/100 km (20.5–19.8 mpg_{‑US})	3,680
420 SEC	W126.046	09/1985 – 08/1987	M 116.965; V8	4196	Mechanical continuous multi-point injection with electronic control (Bosch KE-Jetronic)	150 kW (204 PS; 201 bhp) CAT	310 N⋅m (229 lb⋅ft) CAT	1640	8.7	218 km/h (135 mph)	11.5–11.9 L/100 km (20.5–19.8 mpg_{‑US})	3,680
420 SEC	W126.046	09/1987 – 10/1991	M 116.965; V8	4196	Mechanical continuous multi-point injection with electronic control (Bosch KE-Jetronic)	165 kW (224 PS; 221 bhp) CAT	325 N⋅m (240 lb⋅ft) CAT	1640	8.5	220 km/h (137 mph)	11.5–11.9 L/100 km (20.5–19.8 mpg_{‑US})	3,680
500 SE	W126.036	09/1985 – 05/1987	M 117.965; V8	4973	Mechanical continuous multi-point injection with electronic control (Bosch KE-Jetronic)	180 kW (245 PS; 241 bhp) RÜF	400 N⋅m (295 lb⋅ft) RÜF	1620	7.6	230 km/h (143 mph)	12.0–12.5 L/100 km (19.6–18.8 mpg_{‑US})	33,418 (1979 – 1991)
500 SE	W126.036	06/1987 – 12/1989	M 117.965; V8	4973	Mechanical continuous multi-point injection with electronic control (Bosch KE-Jetronic)	195 kW (265 PS; 261 bhp) RÜF	405 N⋅m (299 lb⋅ft) RÜF	1620	7.3	235 km/h (146 mph)	12.0–12.5 L/100 km (19.6–18.8 mpg_{‑US})	33,418 (1979 – 1991)
500 SE	W126.036	09/1985 – 08/1987	M 117.965; V8	4973	Mechanical continuous multi-point injection with electronic control (Bosch KE-Jetronic)	164 kW (223 PS; 220 bhp) CAT	365 N⋅m (269 lb⋅ft) CAT	1620	8.0	220 km/h (137 mph)	12.0–12.5 L/100 km (19.6–18.8 mpg_{‑US})	33,418 (1979 – 1991)
500 SE	W126.036	09/1987 – 10/1991	M 117.965; V8	4973	Mechanical continuous multi-point injection with electronic control (Bosch KE-Jetronic)	185 kW (252 PS; 248 bhp) CAT	390 N⋅m (288 lb⋅ft) CAT	1620	7.5	230 km/h (143 mph)	12.0–12.5 L/100 km (19.6–18.8 mpg_{‑US})	33,418 (1979 – 1991)
500 SEL	W126.037	09/1985 – 05/1987	M 117.965; V8	4973	Mechanical continuous multi-point injection with electronic control (Bosch KE-Jetronic)	180 kW (245 PS; 241 bhp) RÜF	400 N⋅m (295 lb⋅ft) RÜF	1650	7.6	230 km/h (143 mph)	12.0–12.5 L/100 km (19.6–18.8 mpg_{‑US})	72,733 (1979 – 1991)
500 SEL	W126.037	06/1987 – 12/1989	M 117.965; V8	4973	Mechanical continuous multi-point injection with electronic control (Bosch KE-Jetronic)	195 kW (265 PS; 261 bhp) RÜF	405 N⋅m (299 lb⋅ft) RÜF	1650	7.3	235 km/h (146 mph)	12.0–12.5 L/100 km (19.6–18.8 mpg_{‑US})	72,733 (1979 – 1991)
500 SEL	W126.037	09/1985 – 08/1987	M 117.965; V8	4973	Mechanical continuous multi-point injection with electronic control (Bosch KE-Jetronic)	164 kW (223 PS; 220 bhp) CAT	365 N⋅m (269 lb⋅ft) CAT	1650	8.0	220 km/h (137 mph)	12.0–12.5 L/100 km (19.6–18.8 mpg_{‑US})	72,733 (1979 – 1991)
500 SEL	W126.037	09/1987 – 10/1991	M 117.965; V8	4973	Mechanical continuous multi-point injection with electronic control (Bosch KE-Jetronic)	185 kW (252 PS; 248 bhp) CAT	390 N⋅m (288 lb⋅ft) CAT	1650	7.5	230 km/h (143 mph)	12.0–12.5 L/100 km (19.6–18.8 mpg_{‑US})	72,733 (1979 – 1991)
500 SEC	W126.044	09/1985 – 05/1987	M 117.965; V8	4973	Mechanical continuous multi-point injection with electronic control (Bosch KE-Jetronic)	180 kW (245 PS; 241 bhp) RÜF	400 N⋅m (295 lb⋅ft) RÜF	1640	7.6	230 km/h (143 mph)	12.0–12.5 L/100 km (19.6–18.8 mpg_{‑US})	30,184 (1980 – 1991)
500 SEC	W126.044	06/1987 – 12/1989	M 117.965; V8	4973	Mechanical continuous multi-point injection with electronic control (Bosch KE-Jetronic)	195 kW (265 PS; 261 bhp) RÜF	405 N⋅m (299 lb⋅ft) RÜF	1640	7.3	235 km/h (146 mph)	12.0–12.5 L/100 km (19.6–18.8 mpg_{‑US})	30,184 (1980 – 1991)
500 SEC	W126.044	09/1985 – 08/1987	M 117.965; V8	4973	Mechanical continuous multi-point injection with electronic control (Bosch KE-Jetronic)	164 kW (223 PS; 220 bhp) CAT	365 N⋅m (269 lb⋅ft) CAT	1640	8.0	220 km/h (137 mph)	12.0–12.5 L/100 km (19.6–18.8 mpg_{‑US})	30,184 (1980 – 1991)
500 SEC	W126.044	09/1987 – 10/1991	M 117.965; V8	4973	Mechanical continuous multi-point injection with electronic control (Bosch KE-Jetronic)	185 kW (252 PS; 248 bhp) CAT	390 N⋅m (288 lb⋅ft) CAT	1640	7.5	230 km/h (143 mph)	12.0–12.5 L/100 km (19.6–18.8 mpg_{‑US})	30,184 (1980 – 1991)
560 SE	W126.038	09/1988 – 12/1989	M 117.968; V8	5547	Mechanical continuous multi-point injection with electronic control (Bosch KE-Jetronic)	220 kW (299 PS; 295 bhp) RÜF	455 N⋅m (336 lb⋅ft) RÜF	1800	6.9	250 km/h (155 mph)	13.6 L/100 km (17.3 mpg_{‑US})	1,252
560 SE	W126.038	09/1988 – 10/1991	M 117.968; V8	5547	Mechanical continuous multi-point injection with electronic control (Bosch KE-Jetronic)	205 kW (279 PS; 275 bhp) CAT	430 N⋅m (317 lb⋅ft) CAT	1800	7.2	242 km/h (150 mph)	13.6 L/100 km (17.3 mpg_{‑US})	1,252
560 SEL	W126.039	09/1985 – 08/1986	M 117.968; V8	5547	Mechanical continuous multi-point injection with electronic control (Bosch KE-Jetronic)	220 kW (299 PS; 295 bhp) ECE	455 N⋅m (336 lb⋅ft) ECE	1830	6.9	250 km/h (155 mph)	13.6 L/100 km (17.3 mpg_{‑US})	75,071
560 SEL	W126.039	09/1985 – 08/1987	M 117.968; V8	5547	Mechanical continuous multi-point injection with electronic control (Bosch KE-Jetronic)	200 kW (272 PS; 268 bhp) RÜF	430 N⋅m (317 lb⋅ft) RÜF	1830	7.3	235 km/h (146 mph)	13.6 L/100 km (17.3 mpg_{‑US})	75,071
560 SEL	W126.039	06/1987 – 12/1989	M 117.968; V8	5547	Mechanical continuous multi-point injection with electronic control (Bosch KE-Jetronic)	220 kW (299 PS; 295 bhp) RÜF	455 N⋅m (336 lb⋅ft) RÜF	1830	6.9	250 km/h (155 mph)	13.6 L/100 km (17.3 mpg_{‑US})	75,071
560 SEL	W126.039	09/1985 – 08/1987	M 117.968; V8	5547	Mechanical continuous multi-point injection with electronic control (Bosch KE-Jetronic)	178 kW (242 PS; 239 bhp) CAT	390 N⋅m (288 lb⋅ft) CAT	1830	7.6	228 km/h (142 mph)	13.6 L/100 km (17.3 mpg_{‑US})	75,071
560 SEL	W126.039	09/1987 – 10/1991	M 117.968; V8	5547	Mechanical continuous multi-point injection with electronic control (Bosch KE-Jetronic)	205 kW (279 PS; 275 bhp) CAT	430 N⋅m (317 lb⋅ft) CAT	1830	7.2	242 km/h (150 mph)	13.6 L/100 km (17.3 mpg_{‑US})	75,071
560 SEL	W126.039	09/1985 – 10/1991	M 117.968; V8	5547	Mechanical continuous multi-point injection with electronic control (Bosch KE-Jetronic)	178 kW (242 PS; 239 bhp) US CAT	389 N⋅m (287 lb⋅ft) US CAT	1830	7.0 (0–60 mph)	242 km/h (150 mph)	13.6 L/100 km (17.3 mpg_{‑US})	75,071
560 SEC	W126.045	09/1985 – 10/1991	M 117.968; V8	5547	Mechanical continuous multi-point injection with electronic control (Bosch KE-Jetronic)	220 kW (299 PS; 295 bhp) ECE	455 N⋅m (336 lb⋅ft) ECE	1820	6.9	250 km/h (155 mph)	13.6 L/100 km (17.3 mpg_{‑US})	28,929
560 SEC	W126.045	09/1985 – 08/1987	M 117.968; V8	5547	Mechanical continuous multi-point injection with electronic control (Bosch KE-Jetronic)	200 kW (272 PS; 268 bhp) RÜF	430 N⋅m (317 lb⋅ft) RÜF	1820	7.3	238 km/h (148 mph)	13.6 L/100 km (17.3 mpg_{‑US})	28,929
560 SEC	W126.045	06/1987 – 12/1989	M 117.968; V8	5547	Mechanical continuous multi-point injection with electronic control (Bosch KE-Jetronic)	220 kW (299 PS; 295 bhp) RÜF	455 N⋅m (336 lb⋅ft) RÜF	1820	6.9	250 km/h (155 mph)	13.6 L/100 km (17.3 mpg_{‑US})	28,929
560 SEC	W126.045	09/1985 – 08/1987	M 117.968; V8	5547	Mechanical continuous multi-point injection with electronic control (Bosch KE-Jetronic)	178 kW (242 PS; 239 bhp) CAT	390 N⋅m (288 lb⋅ft) CAT	1820	7.6	228 km/h (142 mph)	13.6 L/100 km (17.3 mpg_{‑US})	28,929
560 SEC	W126.045	09/1987 – 10/1991	M 117.968; V8	5547	Mechanical continuous multi-point injection with electronic control (Bosch KE-Jetronic)	205 kW (279 PS; 275 bhp) CAT	430 N⋅m (317 lb⋅ft) CAT	1820	7.0 (0–60 mph)	242 km/h (150 mph)	13.6 L/100 km (17.3 mpg_{‑US})	28,929
560 SEC	W126.045	09/1985 – 10/1991	M 117.968; V8	5547	Mechanical continuous multi-point injection with electronic control (Bosch KE-Jetronic)	178 kW (242 PS; 239 bhp) US CAT	389 N⋅m (287 lb⋅ft) US CAT	1820	7.0 (0–60 mph)	242 km/h (150 mph)	13.6 L/100 km (17.3 mpg_{‑US})	28,929
Diesel Engines (US and Canada Only)
300 SDL	W126.125	02/1985 – 09/1987	OM 603.961; Inline 6	2996	Precombustion chamber injection (Bosch six-piston inline injection pump)	110 kW (150 PS; 148 bhp)	273 N⋅m (201 lb⋅ft)	1750	12.5	175 km/h (109 mph)	12.4 L/100 km (19.0 mpg_{‑US})	13,830
350 SD	W126.134	06/1990 – 08/1991	OM 603.970; Inline 6	3449	Precombustion chamber injection (Bosch six-piston inline injection pump)	100 kW (136 PS; 134 bhp)	310 N⋅m (229 lb⋅ft)	1770	13.0	175 km/h (109 mph)	12.4 L/100 km (19.0 mpg_{‑US})	2,066
350 SDL	W126.135	06/1990 – 08/1991	OM 603.970; Inline 6	3449	Precombustion chamber injection (Bosch six-piston inline injection pump)	100 kW (136 PS; 134 bhp)	310 N⋅m (229 lb⋅ft)	1790	13.0	175 km/h (109 mph)	12.4 L/100 km (19.0 mpg_{‑US})	2,925
