= M114 =

M114 or M-114 may refer to:

- M114 155 mm howitzer, a towed howitzer used by the United States Army
- M114 armored fighting vehicle, a Vietnam War-era tracked armored fighting vehicle, used by the United States Army
- M114 bomb, a U.S. 4 lb. biological anti-personnel bomb, sub-munition for the M33 cluster bomb
- M-114 highway (Michigan), a former road in the United States of America
- Mercedes-Benz M114 engine
