= Mercedes-Benz R107 and C107 =

Luxory motor vehicle from 1971 through 1989

Mercedes-Benz SL (R107) and SLC (C107)
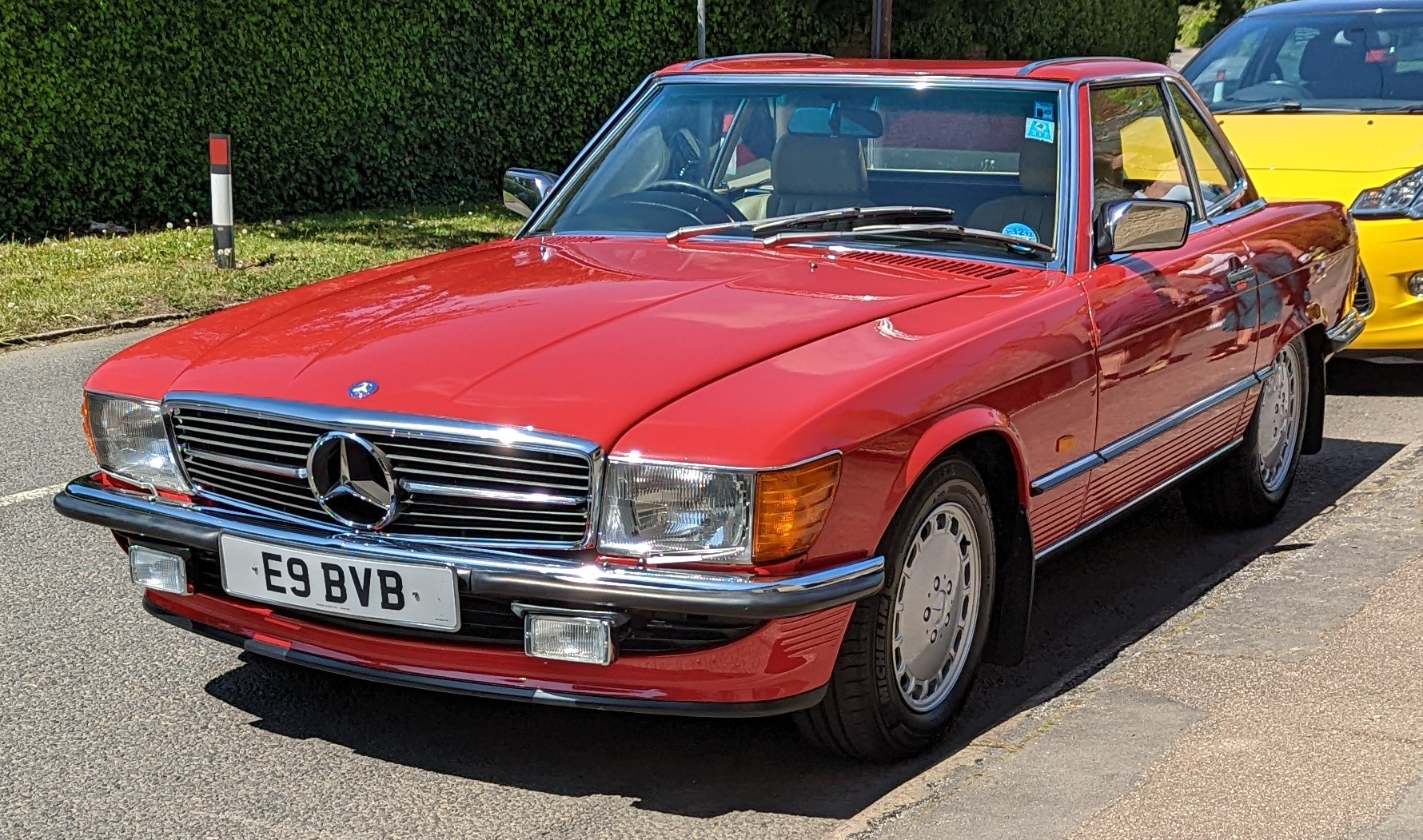
- Mercedes 280 SL R107

Overview
- Manufacturer: Mercedes-Benz (Daimler-Benz)
- Production: April 1971 – March 1989 (SL); October 1971 – September 1981 (SLC); 300,175 built
- Model years: 1971–1989 (SL, 237,287 built); 1972–1981 (SLC, 62,888 built)
- Assembly: West Germany: Sindelfingen; South Africa: East London (CKD)
- Designer: Joseph Gallitzendörfer; Friedrich Geiger (1968)

Body and chassis
- Class: Sports car/Grand tourer
- Body style: two-door roadster two-door coupé
- Layout: FR layout
- Related: Mercedes-Benz W114

Powertrain
- Engine: 2.8 L M110 I6 (SL, SLC); 3.0 L M103.980 I6 (SL); 3.5 L M116.980 V8 (SL, SLC); 3.8 L M116.980 V8 (SL, SLC); 4.2 L M116.980 V8 (SL); 4.5 L M117.982 V8 (SL, SLC); 5.0 L M117.960 V8 (SL, SLC); 5.6 L M117.967 V8 (SL)
- Transmission: Automatic: 3-speed 722.0 350/450SL/SLC; 4-speed 722.1 280SL/SLC; 4-speed 722.2 350SL/SLC 450SLC; 4 speed 4G-TRONIC; Manual: 4-speed (280/350SL/SLC); 5-speed (280/300SL/SLC)

Dimensions
- Wheelbase: SL: 2,460 mm (96.9 in) or 2,455 mm (96.7 in); SLC: 2,820 mm (111.0 in) or 2,815 mm (110.8 in)
- Length: SL: 4,390 mm (172.8 in); US: 4,630 mm (182.3 in); SLC: 4,750 mm (187.0 in); US: 4,990 mm (196.5 in); 560 SL: 4,580 mm (180.3 in)
- Width: 1,790 mm (70.5 in)
- Height: SL: 1,290 mm (50.8 in); SLC: 1,330 mm (52.4 in)
- Curb weight: 3,494 lb (1,585 kg)

Chronology
- Predecessor: Mercedes-Benz W113 (SL); Mercedes-Benz W111 (coupé)
- Successor: Mercedes-Benz R129 (SL); Mercedes-Benz C126 (coupé)

The Mercedes-Benz R107 and C107 are grand tourers which were produced by Mercedes-Benz from 1971 until 1989, being the second longest single series ever produced by the automaker after the G-Class. They were sold under the SL (R107) and SLC (C107) model names in a variety of names indicating the displacement of the engines.

The R107/SL was a two-seat convertible with a detachable roof. During its production run, the R107 was the only roadster offered by Mercedes-Benz, as it replaced the W113 SL-Class in 1971 and was replaced by the R129 SL-Class in 1989. The C107/SLC was a four-seat car with a fixed roof and an optional sliding steel sunroof. It replaced the W111 Coupé in 1971 and was in turn replaced by the C126 S-class coupé in 1981.

The predecessor W113 was notably successful in North America, with 19,440 units (40%) of 48,912 total units sold in the US. The R107 and C107 were even more focused on the American market, with specialized engines, bumper designs, headlights, and emissions management designs. The R107 and C107 sold 204,373 units in the US (68%) of 300,175 total units sold (excluding grey market sales into the US).

== Model history ==
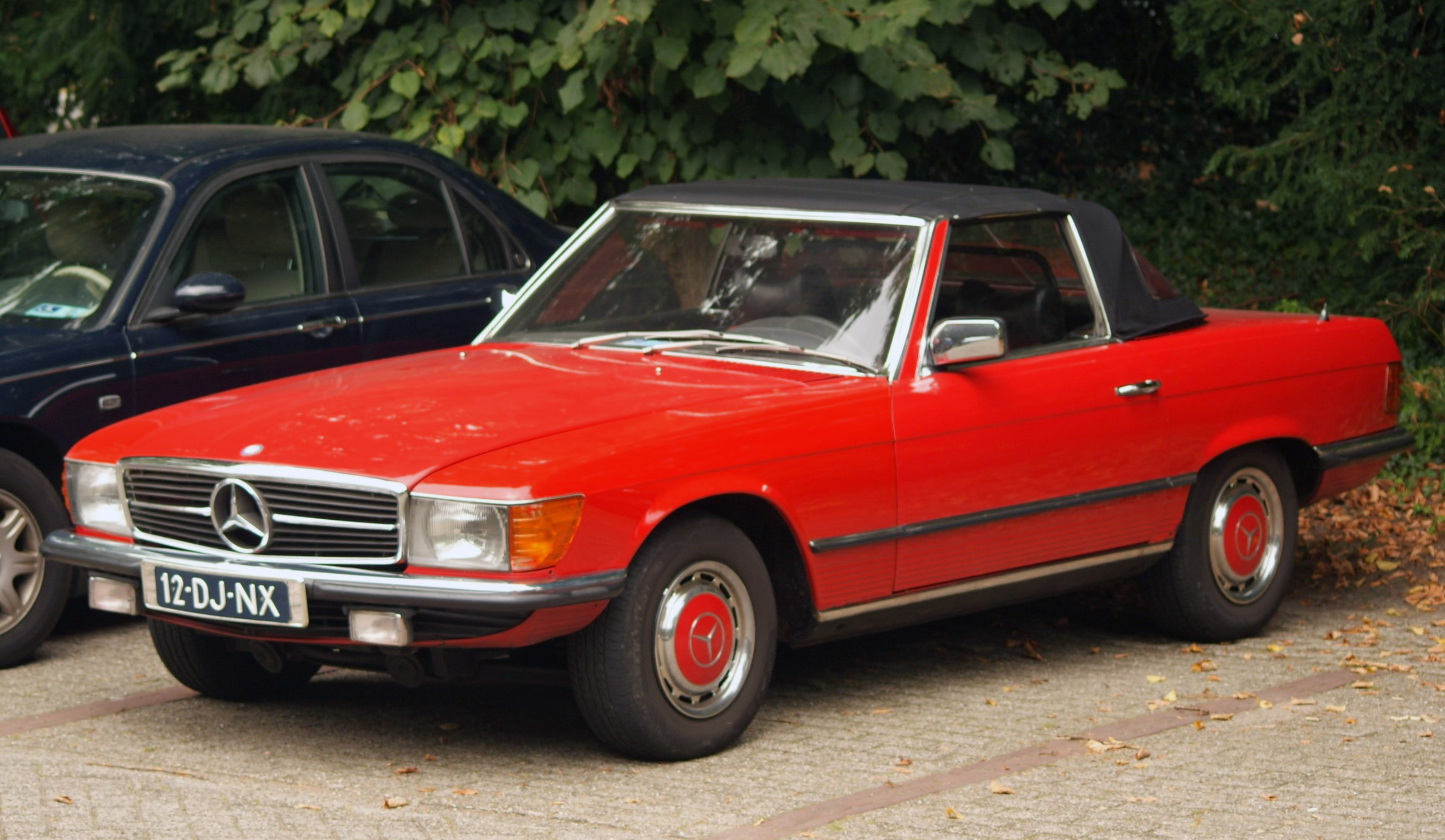
1977 Mercedes-Benz 280SL

The R107 and C107 took the chassis components of the midsize 1968 Mercedes-Benz W114 model and mated them initially to the M116 and M117 V8 engines used in the W108, W109 and W111 series. The body styles for both R107 and C107 did not change materially from introduction in 1971 to their end of production in 1981 (coupé) and 1989 (soft-top) respectively.

The SL (R107) variant was a 2-seat convertible/roadster with standard soft-top, with optional winter hardtop and only rarely ordered very small rear bench-seat.

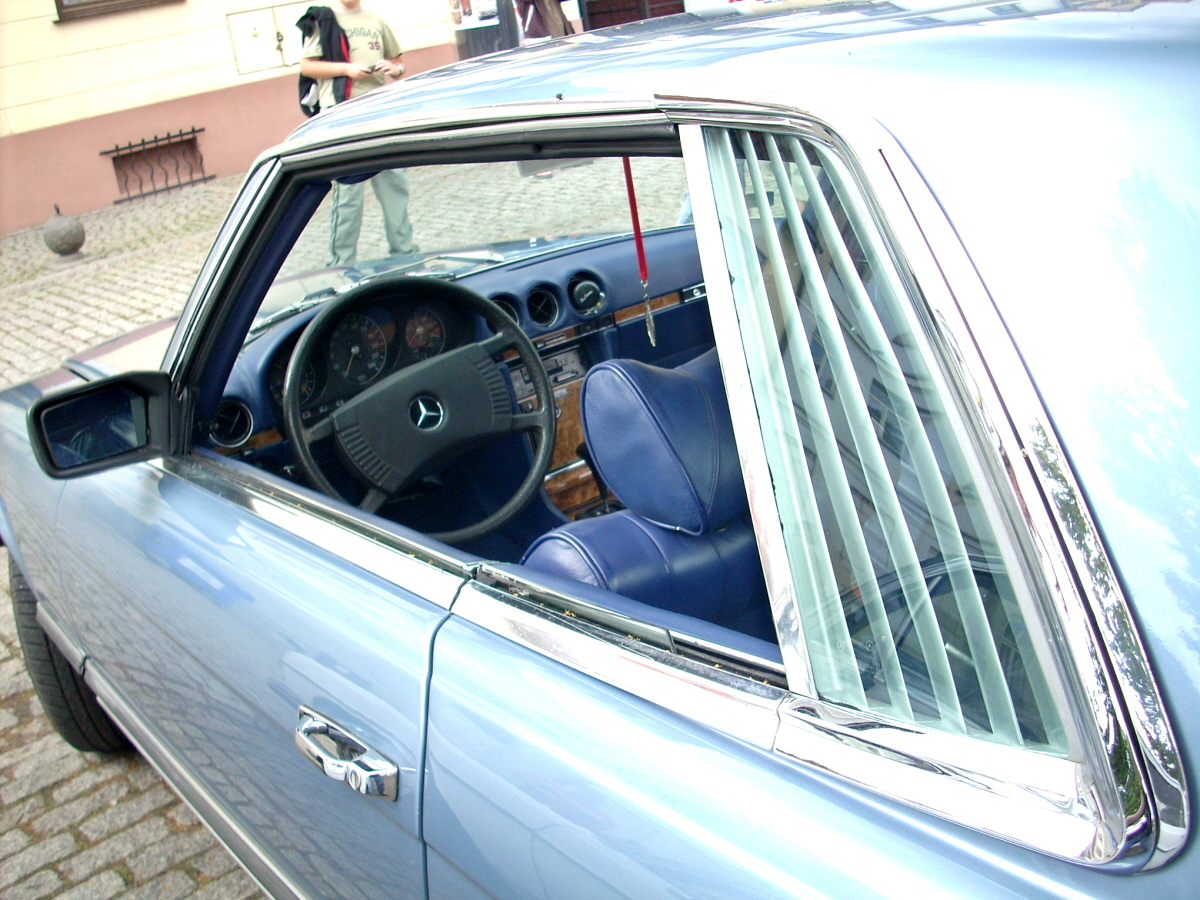
SLC rear quarter window slats

The SLC (C107) derivative was a 2-door hardtop coupé, on a 36 cm (14.2 in) longer wheelbase, and with normally sized rear seats. The SLC was the first and only time that Mercedes-Benz based their S-class coupé on a stretched SL roadster platform, rather than on a large S-class saloon. The SLC replaced the former saloon-based 280/300SE coupé in the Mercedes lineup, while there was no two-door version of the W116. The SLC model run ended in 1981, much earlier than the SL. It was replaced by the considerably larger 380SEC and 500SEC, once again derived from the 1980 S-class line.

Volume production of the first R107 car, the 350SL, started in April 1971 alongside the last of the W113 cars; the 350SLC followed in October. The early 1971 350SL are very rare and were available with an optional 4 speed fluid coupling automatic gearbox. The 1971 4sp auto were quick cars for the day with 0-60 mph in 8 seconds. In addition, the rare 1971 cars were fitted with Bosch electronic fuel injection.

=== European models and engines ===
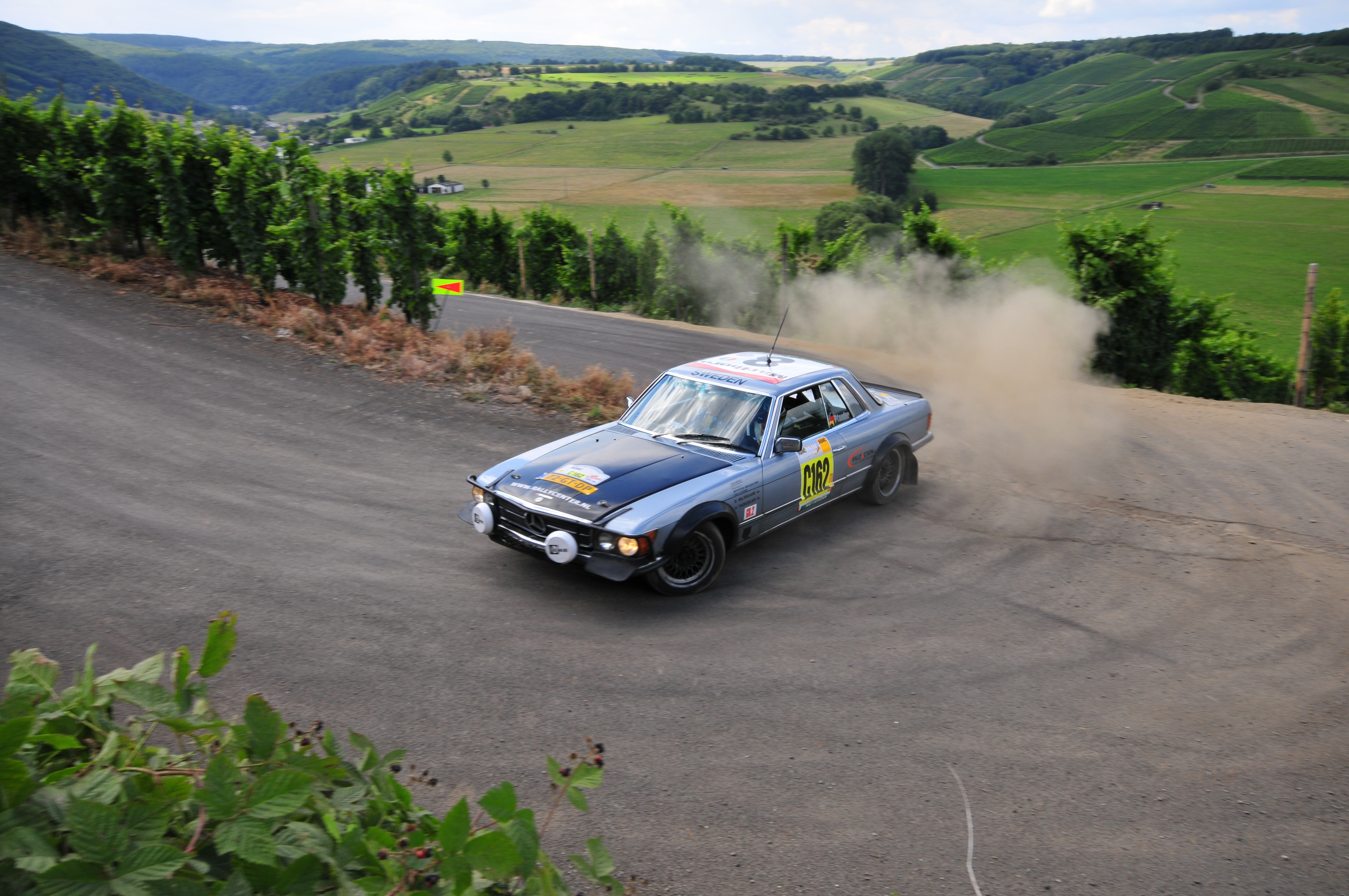
The C107 SLC has had a successful rally career

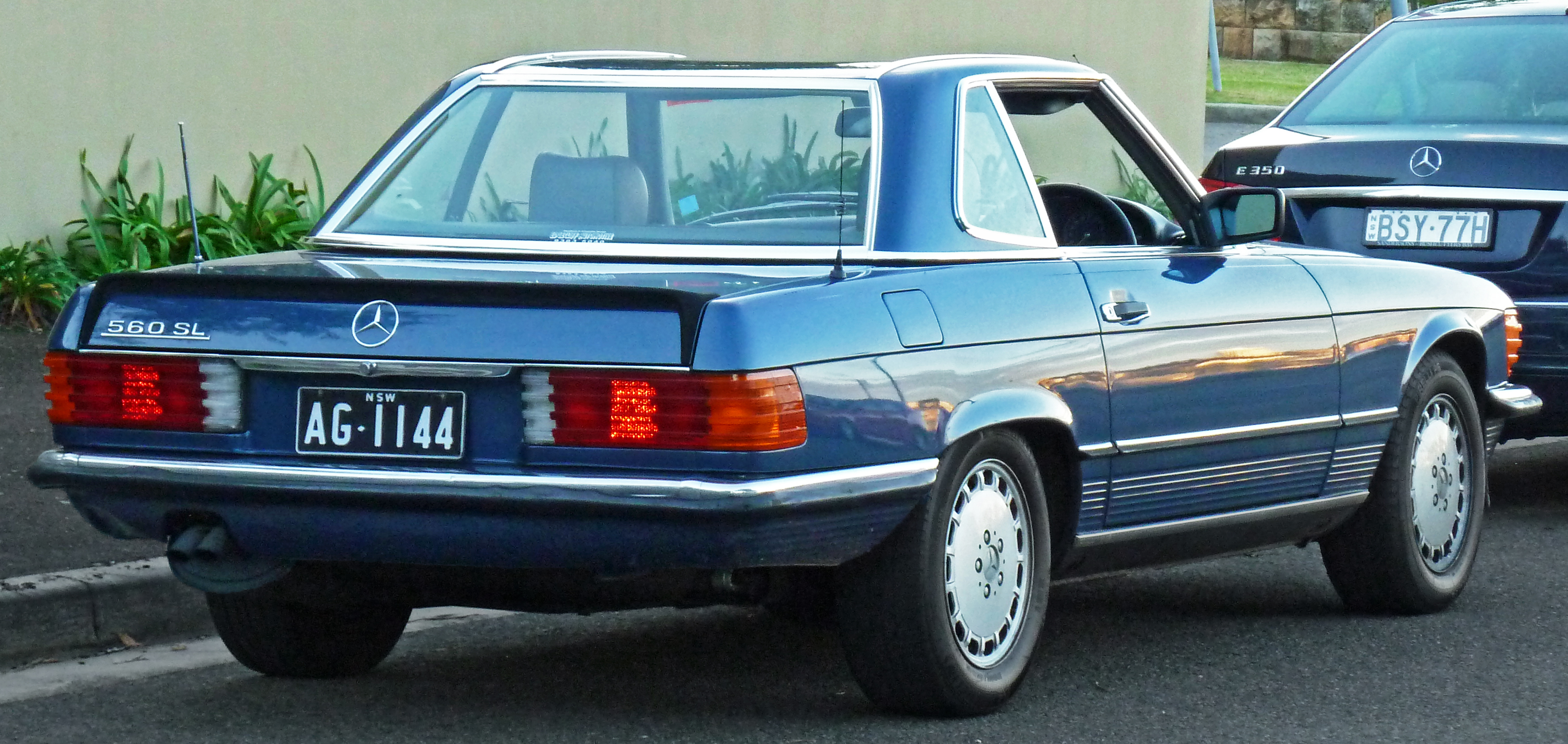
Mercedes 560SL (Australia)

The initial 350SL and 350SLC for the European market used a 3.5 liter V8 engine mated to a 4-speed manual or a 3-speed automatic. Two years later, in 1973, the larger automatic-only 450SL and 450SLC were added, soon to be overshadowed by the oil crisis. Mercedes reacted by also offering a more economic and lighter straight-6 again, the 2.8L DOHC Mercedes-Benz M110 engine in its fuel-injected version that nearly matched the 350 automatic in performance. From July 1974 both SL and SLC could also be ordered as 280SL and 280SLC.

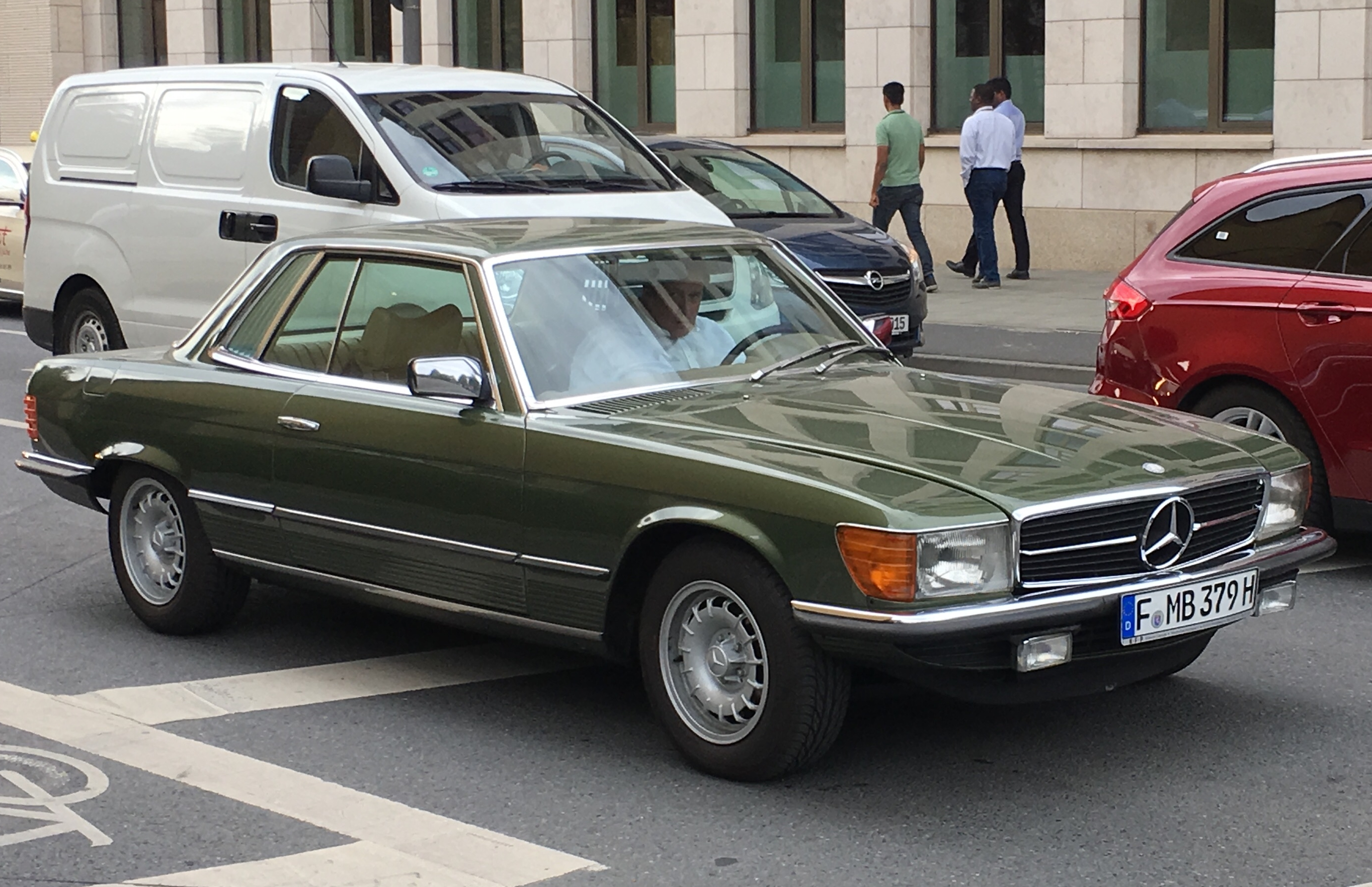
Mercedes-Benz 500SLC 5.0

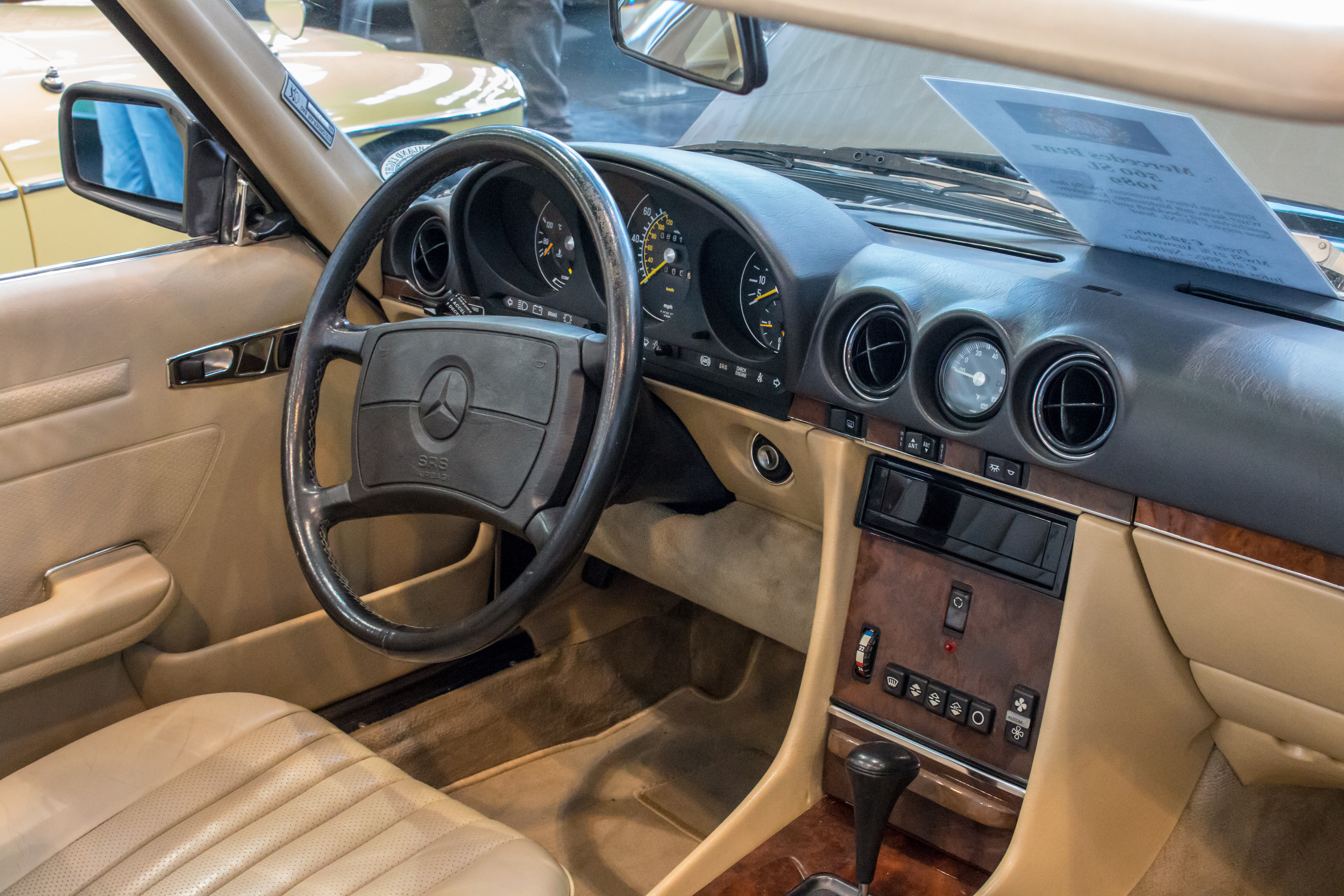
1989 Mercedes-Benz 560SL interior

Initially all cars had the Bosch D-Jetronic fuel injection system, an early electronic engine management system. In December 1975 this was replaced by the Bosch K-Jetronic system, an entirely mechanical fuel injection system. This was paralleled with electronic breaker-less ignition and hydraulic valve-lash compensation systems. Performance was mildly reduced to comply with new emission laws.

Mercedes had started to enter some rallying events with the V8 SLC. In September 1977 the 450SLC 5.0 joined the line. This was a homologation version of the big coupé, featuring a new all-aluminium five-liter V8, aluminium alloy bonnet and boot lid, as well as a black rubber rear spoiler and a small front lip spoiler. These changes resulted in a reduction in weight of over 100kg when compared to the 'old' 450SLC. The '5.0' was built in limited numbers, only 2,769 being completed between 1977 and 1981. Maximum speed of the '5.0' was some 10km/h faster than that of the '4.5' at around 225km/h. The 450SLC 5.0 was produced in order to homologate the SLC for the 1978 World Rally Championship. The rallying results were mixed, but the Bandama Rallye Côte d'Ivoire was won twice, in 1979 and 1980.

Starting in 1980, the 350SLC, 450SLC, and 450SLC 5.0 models (like the 350SL and 450SL) were discontinued in 1980 with the introduction of the 380SLC and 500SLC in March 1980. At the same time, the cars received a very mild makeover; the 3-speed automatic was replaced by a four-speed unit, returning to where the R107 started in 1971 with the optional 4 speed automatic 350SL (3.5lt).

The C107 coupés 280SLC, 380SLC, and 500SLC were discontinued in 1981 with the introduction of the C126 series 380SEC and 500SEC coupés. A total of 62,888 SLCs had been manufactured over a ten-year period of which just 1,636 were the 450SLC-5.0 and 1,133 were the 500SLC. Both these models are sought by collectors today. With the exception of the R171 SLK 55 AMG Black Series and the SL65 AMG Black Series, the SLC remains the only fixed roof Mercedes-Benz coupé based on a roadster rather than a saloon.

Following the discontinuation of the SLC in November 1981, the R107 series continued, initially as the 280SL, 380SL, and 500SL. At this time, the V8 engines were re-tuned for greater efficiency, lost a few horsepower and consumed less fuel, largely due to substantially higher (numerically lower) axle ratios that went from 3.27:1 to 2.47:1 for the 380SL and from 2.72:1 to 2.27:1 for the 500SL.

From September 1985 the 280SL was replaced by a new 300SL and the 380SL by a 420SL; the 500SL continued and a 560SL was introduced for certain extra-European markets, notably the USA, Australia, and Japan.

Also in 1985, the Bosch KE Jetronic was fitted. The KE Jetronic system varied from the earlier, all mechanical system by the introduction of a more modern engine management "computer", which controlled idle speed, fuel rate, and air/fuel mixture. The final car of the 18 years running R107 series was a 500SL painted Signal Red, built on 4 August 1989; it currently resides in the Mercedes-Benz museum in Stuttgart, Germany.

=== North American models ===
North America was the key market for this Personal luxury car, and two thirds of R107 and C107 production was sold there.

Sales in North America began with the 1972 model year. These early cars wore 350SL badging, but actually had a larger, 4.5-liter V8, coupled to a three-speed automatic - they were renamed 450SL for model year 1973. The big V8 engine became available on other markets with the official introduction of the 450SL/SLC on non-North American markets in March 1973.

R107 and C107 cars were continuously subjected to the ever stringent US emission regulations, with lower compression. At the start the American M117 made a SAE net rating of 192 hp (143 kW) at 4750 rpm and 240 lb⋅ft (325 N⋅m) at 3000 rpm; over the years this would continuously plummet, eventually reaching 162 hp (121 kW) at 4200 rpm with 230 lb⋅ft (312 N⋅m) at 2500 rpm. The European M117, by comparison, produces 218 PS (160 kW; 215 hp) at 5000 rpm and 360 N⋅m (266 lb⋅ft) at 3250 rpm for 1976 through 1980.

The R107/C107 for the North American market sported four round low-output sealed beam headlights, due to unique U.S. regulations. From 1974, the front and rear bumpers were dramatically lengthened, by 8 inches (203 mm) on each end, to comply with the U.S. National Highway Traffic Safety Administration regulations that mandated no damage at an impact of 5 miles per hour (8.0 km/h). North American market SL and SLC models retained the protruding 5 mph bumpers, even after the wisdom of the law had been reconsidered in 1981.

The smaller engined 380SL replaced the 450SL from 1981 to 1985. The Malaise era 380SL was the least powerful of the US market R107 roadsters. Starting in 1980, US cars were equipped with lambda control, which varied the air/fuel mixture based on feedback from an oxygen sensor. The 380SL was published by Mercedes-Benz as having 0-60 mph time of 9.3 seconds for a top speed of 205 km/h (127 mph). Torque for the 380SL is 232 lb⋅ft (315 N⋅m).

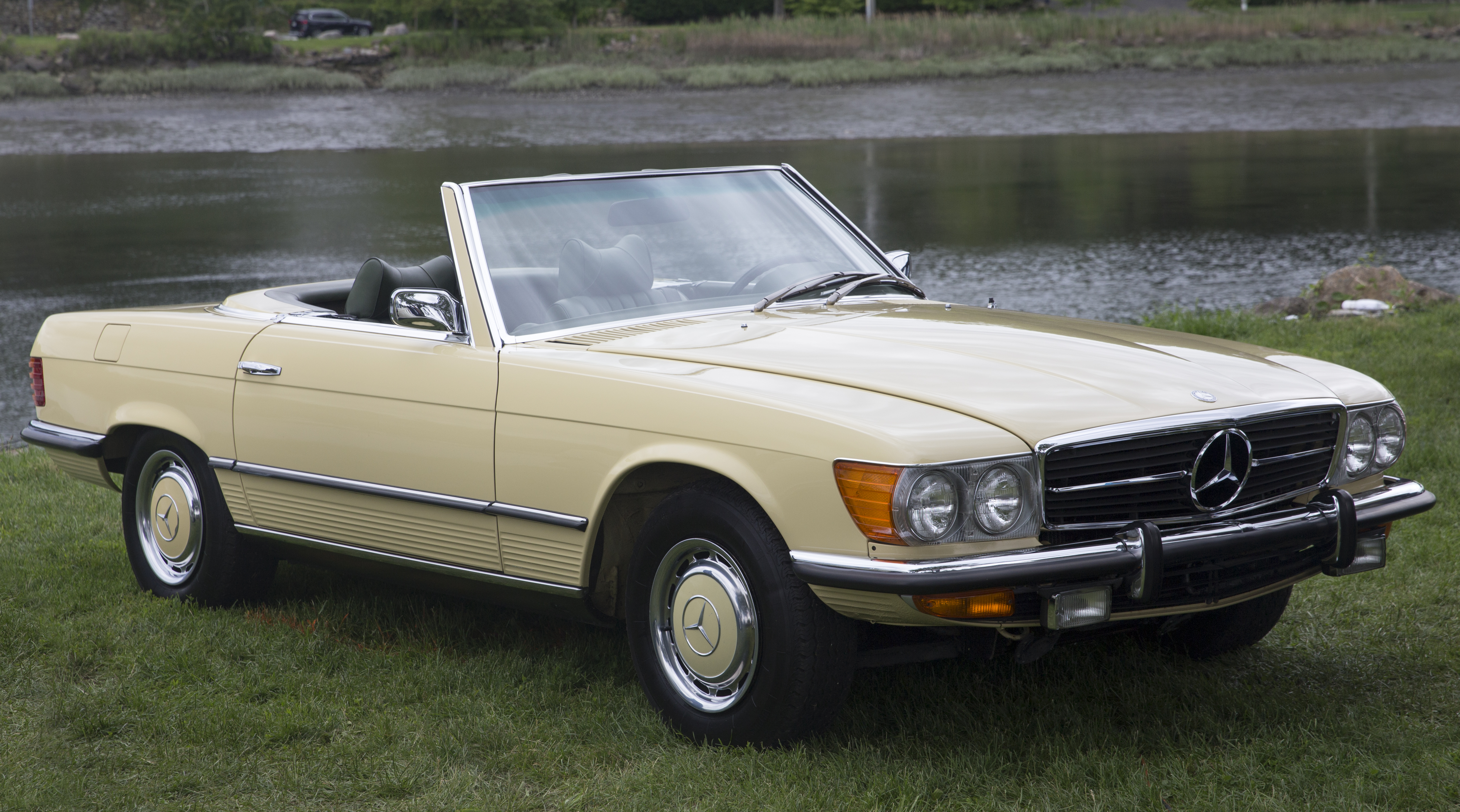
1973 Mercedes-Benz 450SL; early model with short, US-market bumpers and sealed-beam headlamps.

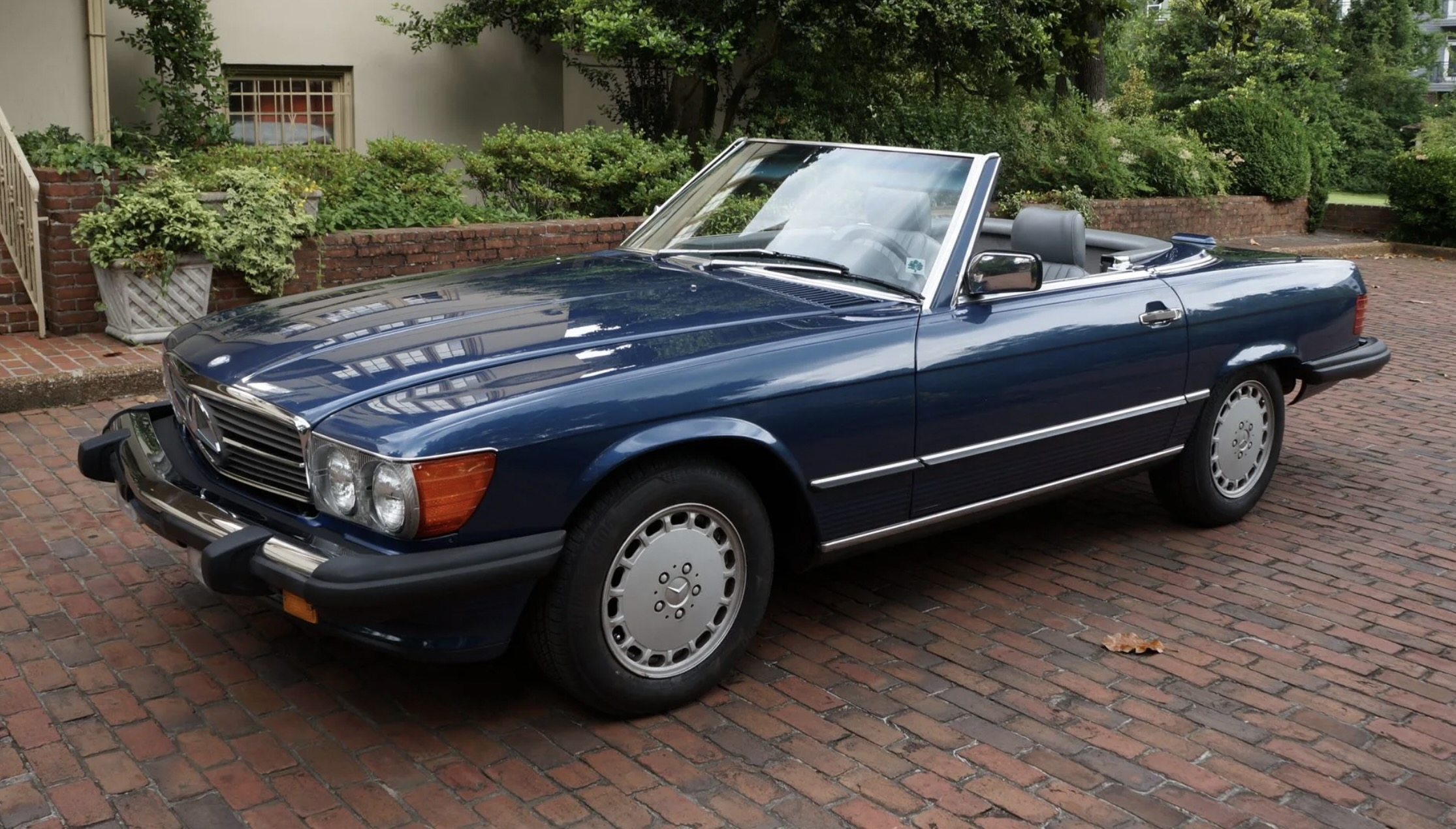
1988 Mercedes-Benz 560SL, US-spec with prominent bumpers

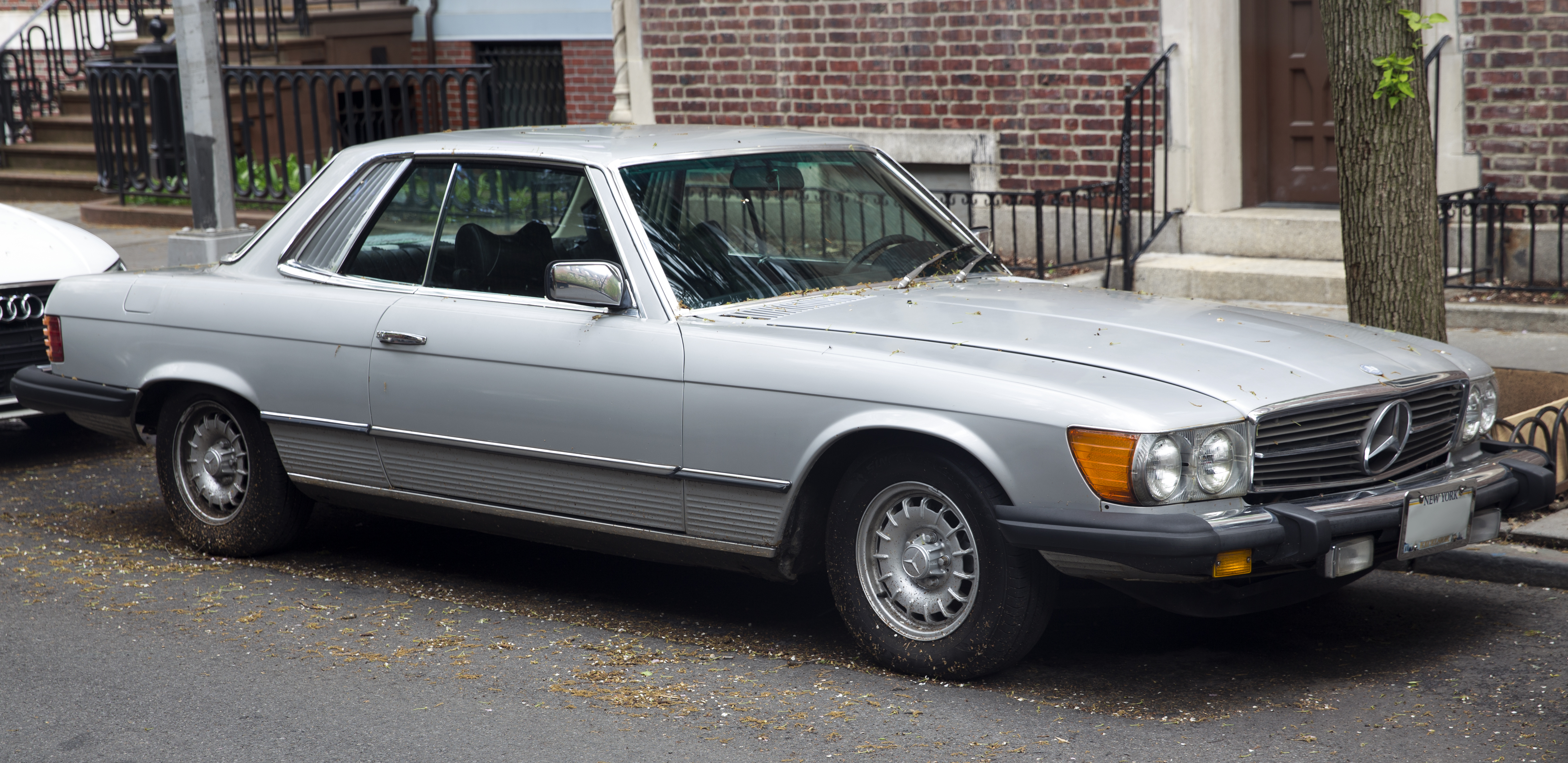
1977 Mercedes-Benz 450SLC, US-spec with large bumpers and sealed-beam headlamps

==== US gray market sales ====
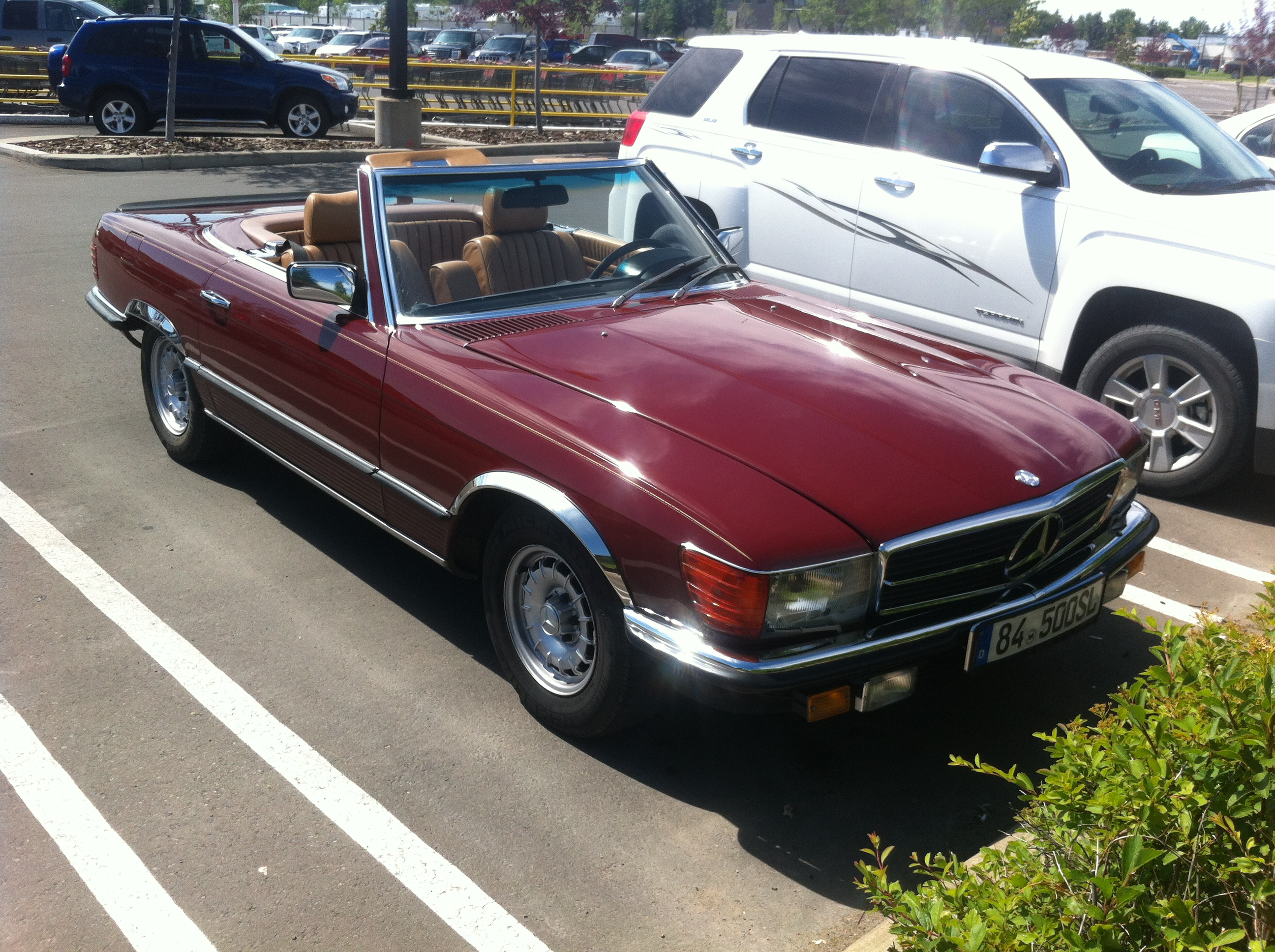
1984 Mercedes-Benz 500SL (gray market import)

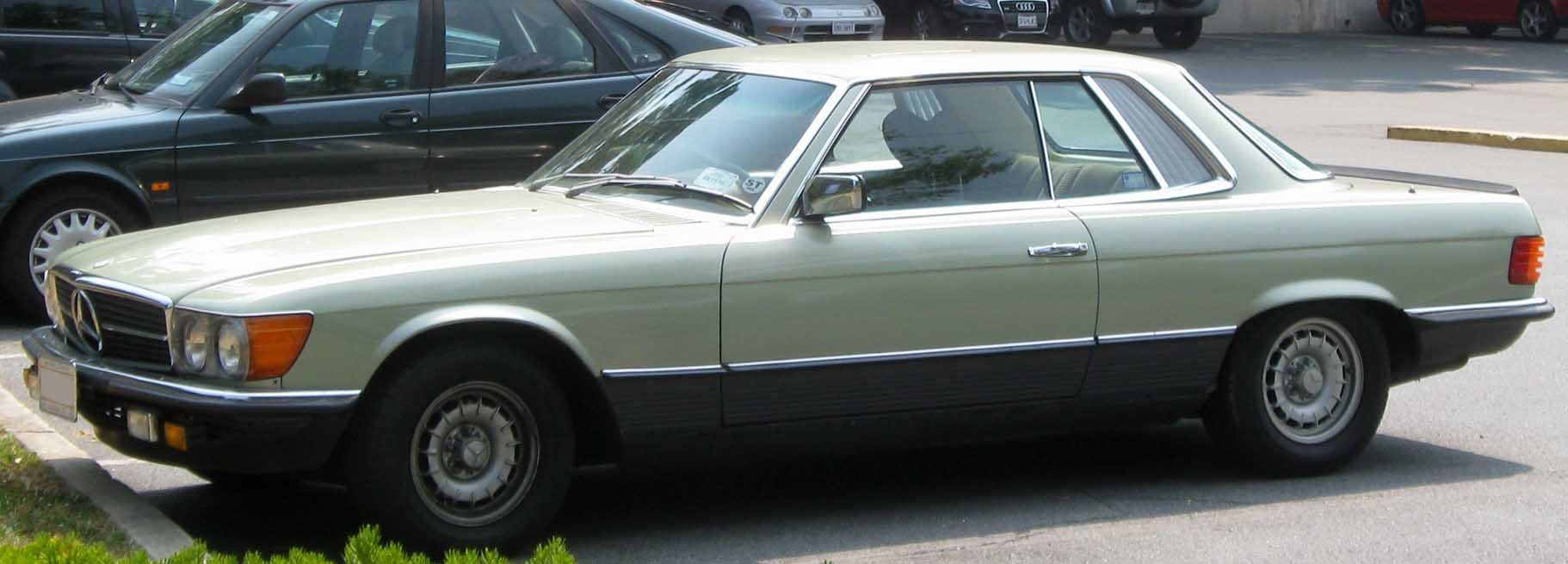
Mercedes-Benz 450SLC 5.0 (gray market import)

The more powerful 500SL with a 5.0 liter engine, produced from 1980–1989, was not available in the US. This drove many customers to obtain the European specification car in the "gray market," where the vehicles were converted to meet Federal mandates, until this option was eliminated by Congress in 1988.

From 1986 to 1989, a more powerful version was available from the factory, the 560SL. It was exclusive to the USA, European, Japanese and Australian markets. Despite the larger 5.6 liter engine of the U.S. 560SL, the forbidden Euro-spec 500SL was the fastest production R107 produced (mostly because of the lack of emission reducing components).

The 500SL was published by Mercedes-Benz as having 0-60 mph times of 7.4 seconds for a top speed of 225 km/h (140 mph). Torque for the 500SL is 296 lb⋅ft (401 N⋅m) at 3200 rpm and for the 560SL 287 lb⋅ft (389 N⋅m) at 3500 rpm.

==== Mechanical troubles ====
Model years 1975 and 1976 for the 450SL suffered from vapor lock and hard restart because of the under-bonnet position of the catalytic converter. Starting in MY 1977, the catalytic converter was moved to replace the resonator, located just behind the transmission in the exhaust system.

The 380SL/SLC engine came with a single row timing chain from 1981 through 1983. These early 380SL/SLC models were plagued with chain failure problems and the problem was corrected by Mercedes-Benz, free of charge (at the time; not honored today). Some vehicles escaped the retrofit and may at some point fail as a result. Model Years ("MYs") 1984 and 1985 came with a double row timing chain from the factory to address this issue.

Another problem area for late 450SLs was the automatic climate control system. Based on a servo which controlled coolant flow to the heater core, as well as vacuum to actuate the vents in the interior of the car, the system proved unreliable. It was installed on 450SLs through end of production in 1980. Models produced prior to 1978 had a manual climate control system, 380SL models produced from 1981 received a more reliable automatic climate control system.

=== South African assembly ===
Both the SL and SLC models were also assembled in South Africa by UCDD (United Car and Diesel Distributors) for the captive domestic market from early 1977 (on a contractor basis before Daimler-Benz A.G. acquired a majority stake of UCDD in 1984). Only about 40 units per month were built.

=== AMG models ===
AMG offered enhancements for all R107/C107 models, while engine enhancements were not available for the 420 SL.

AMG offered two upgrade tiers for the M117. Tier 1 includes: Combustion chambers and conduits of both cylinder heads were reworked and polished, two AMG camshafts. Tier 1 rose output by 19kW (26HP). Tier 2 includes all of Tier 1 and: Larger valves and camshafts with longer valve timing and more valve stroke along with higher compression combustion chambers rising output 37kW (46HP).

In the first half of the 1980's a few copies of the 500 SL were made equipped with AMG tuned M 117 with 5.2 and 5.4 liter displacements.

AMG options included aerodynamic and appearance elements, limited slip differentials of 3.06, 3.27, and 3.46 ratios, suspension and handling equipment, AMG steering wheels, extended range fuel tanks and rare 5 speed manual transmissions.

Individual vehicles made for special clients include a 350 SLC 6.3, equipped with the M100 and the 450 SLC 6.9 equipped with M100 engine from the W116 450 SEL 6.9. AMG manufactured at least one convertible based on the 450 SLC.

== Technical data ==
=== Europe ===
Technical data Mercedes-Benz R107/C107 (standard version – non USA, S, J, AUS) (Manufacturer's figures except where stated)
Model	280 SL 280 SLC	300 SL	350 SL 350 SLC	380 SL 380 SLC	420 SL	450 SL 450 SLC	450 SLC 5.0 (Note: to introduce the new aluminum engines (type M 116 and M 117) from MY 1978/79 the 450 SLC 5.0 was launched: bore × stroke 97 mm (3.819 in) × 85 mm (3.346 in) · 5,025 cc (306.6 cu in) · 240 PS (177 kW; 237 hp) @ 5000 · 3-speed automatic W3B 050 ·722.0) 500 SL 500 SLC
Produced	MY 1974–1985; MY 1974–1981	MY 1985–1989	MY 1971–1980	MY 1980–1985; MY 1980–1981	MY 1985–1989	MY 1973–1980	MY 1978–1979; MY 1980–1989; MY 1980–1981
Layout	longitudinal engine						
Engine type	M 110	M 103	M 116			M 117	
Configuration	6-cylinder-inline (four-stroke)		90° 8-cylinder-V (four-stroke)				
Bore × Stroke	86 mm (3.386 in) × 78.8 mm (3.102 in)	88.5 mm (3.484 in) × 80.25 mm (3.159 in)	92 mm (3.622 in) × 65.8 mm (2.591 in)	92 mm (3.622 in) × 71.8 mm (2.827 in) (Note: from MY 1981/82 a different 3.8 L engine was used ·bore × stroke 88 mm (3.465 in) × 78.9 mm (3.106 in) · 3,839 cc (234.3 cu in) · 204 PS (150 kW; 201 hp) @ 5250) · this engine was already used in North America)	92 mm (3.622 in) × 78.9 mm (3.106 in)	92 mm (3.622 in) × 85 mm (3.346 in)	96.5 mm (3.799 in) × 85 mm (3.346 in)
Displacement	2,746 cc (167.6 cu in)	2,962 cc (180.8 cu in)	3,499 cc (213.5 cu in)	3,818 cc (233.0 cu in)	4,196 cc (256.1 cu in)	4,520 cc (275.8 cu in)	4,973 cc (303.5 cu in)
Fuel feed	Fuel injection: Bosch D-Jetronic (–1976) · K-Jetronic (–1980) · K-Jetronic with Lambda (–1985) · KE-Jetronic (from 1985)						
Fuel tank capacity	90 L (23.8 US gal; 19.8 imp gal) · from 1985: 85 L (22.5 US gal; 18.7 imp gal)						
Valvetrain	DOHC · duplex chain	SOHC · simplex chain	SOHC · duplex chain				
Cooling	Water						
Compression Ratio	9.0: 1	9.2: 1	9.5: 1	9.0: 1		8.8: 1	9.0: 1
Max. Power @ rpm:	185 PS (136 kW; 182 hp) @ 6000 (Note: from MY 1976/77 (change from D-Jetronic to K-Jetronic) 177 PS (130 kW; 175 hp) @ 6000 · from MY 1980/81 185 PS (136 kW; 182 hp) @ 5800)	190 PS (140 kW; 187 hp) @ 5700	200 PS (147 kW; 197 hp) @ 5800 (Note: from MY 1976/77 (change from D-Jetronic to K-Jetronic) 195 PS (143 kW; 192 hp) @ 5750 · from MY 1978/79 205 PS (151 kW; 202 hp) @ 5800)	218 PS (160 kW; 215 hp) @ 5500	218 PS (160 kW; 215 hp) @ 5200	225 PS (165 kW; 222 hp) @ 5000 (Note: from MY 1975/76 (change from D-Jetronic to K-Jetronic) 217 PS (160 kW; 214 hp) @ 5000 · from MY 1978/79 225 PS (165 kW; 222 hp) @ 5000)	240 PS (177 kW; 237 hp) @ 5000 (Note: from MY 1981/82 231 PS (170 kW; 228 hp) @ 4750 · from MY 1985/86 245 PS (180 kW; 242 hp) @ 5200 · catalyst version 223 PS (164 kW; 220 hp) @ 4700)
Max. Torque @ rpm	238 N⋅m (176 lb⋅ft) @ 4500	255 N⋅m (188 lb⋅ft) @ 4400	286 N⋅m (211 lb⋅ft) @ 4000	299 N⋅m (221 lb⋅ft) @ 4000	324 N⋅m (239 lb⋅ft) @ 3750	377 N⋅m (278 lb⋅ft) @ 3000	402 N⋅m (296 lb⋅ft) @ 3200
Gearbox	4- or 5-speed manual 4-speed automatic on request		4- or 5-speed manual 3-speed automatic on request (Note: MY 1971–1972: 4-speed automatic K4A 040 · 722.2)	4-speed automatic		3-speed automatic	4-speed automatic
Automatic model Automatic type	W4B 025; 722.1	W4A 040; 722.3	W3A 040; 722.0	W4A 040; 722.3		W3B 050; 722.0	W4A 040; 722.3
Transmission	rear wheel drive						
Electrical system	12 volt						
Front Suspension	Independent, double wishbones, torsion anti-roll bar, anti-dive device						
Front Suspension	Coil and additional rubber springs						
Rear Suspension	Independent, semi-trailing arm ("diagonal swing axle"), torsion anti-roll bar						
Rear Suspension	—					Anti-squat device	
Rear Suspension	Coil springs						
Brakes	Disc brakes (Ø front/rear: 278 mm (10.9 in)/279 mm (11.0 in) · from 1985: 284 mm (11.2 in)/279 mm (11.0 in)) power assisted · from 1980: ABS on request or standard						
Steering	Recirculating ball steering						
Track front · rear	1,452 mm (57.2 in) · 1,440 mm (56.7 in) from 1985: 1,461 mm (57.5 in) · 1,465 mm (57.7 in)						
Wheelbase:	2,460 mm (96.9 in); 2,820 mm (111.0 in)					2,455 mm (96.7 in); 2,815 mm (110.8 in)	
Body structure	Sheet steel · unibody construction						
Length	4,390 mm (172.8 in) 4,750 mm (187.0 in)						
Width	1,790 mm (70.5 in)						
Height	1,300 mm (51.2 in); 1,330 mm (52.4 in)						
Curb weight	1,560 kg (3,439 lb); 1,610 kg (3,549 lb)	1,530 kg (3,373 lb)	1,600 kg (3,527 lb); 1,650 kg (3,638 lb)	1,640 kg (3,616 lb); 1,690 kg (3,726 lb)	1,600 kg (3,527 lb)	1,640 kg (3,616 lb); 1,690 kg (3,726 lb)	1,600 kg (3,527 lb); 1,570 kg (3,461 lb)
Loaded weight	1,920 kg (4,233 lb); 2,040 kg (4,497 lb)	1,930 kg (4,255 lb)	1,960 kg (4,321 lb); 2,050 kg (4,519 lb)	1,960 kg (4,321 lb); 2,050 kg (4,519 lb)	2,020 kg (4,453 lb)	2,015 kg (4,442 lb); 2,095 kg (4,619 lb)	1,960 kg (4,321 lb); 2,005 kg (4,420 lb)
Wheel size	6J × 14	7J × 15	6,5J × 14		7J × 15	6,5J × 14 (Note: from 1985: 7J × 15)	
Tire size	185 HR 14	205/65 VR 15	205/70 VR 14		205/65 VR 15	205/70 VR 14 (Note: from 1985: 205/65 VR 15)	
Top speed	207 km/h (129 mph)	210 km/h (130 mph)	212 km/h (132 mph)	215 km/h (134 mph)	210 km/h (130 mph)	218 km/h (135 mph)	225 km/h (140 mph)
Fuel Consumption (estimates)	15.5 L/100 km (15.2 mpg_{‑US}; 18.2 mpg_{‑imp})	14.5 L/100 km (16.2 mpg_{‑US}; 19.5 mpg_{‑imp})	18.5 L/100 km (12.7 mpg_{‑US}; 15.3 mpg_{‑imp})	18.5 L/100 km (12.7 mpg_{‑US}; 15.3 mpg_{‑imp})	15.5 L/100 km (15.2 mpg_{‑US}; 18.2 mpg_{‑imp})	18.5 L/100 km (12.7 mpg_{‑US}; 15.3 mpg_{‑imp})	18.5 L/100 km (12.7 mpg_{‑US}; 15.3 mpg_{‑imp})

=== North America ===
Technical data Mercedes-Benz R107/C107 (North American models) (Manufacturer's figures except where stated)
Model	350 SL · 450 SL 350 SLC · 450 SLC	380 SL 380 SLC	560 SL
Produced	MY 1972–1980	MY 1981–1985; MY 1981	MY 1986–1989
Layout	longitudinal engine		
Engine type	M 117	M 116	M 117
Configuration	90° 8-cylinder-V engine (four-stroke)		
Bore × Stroke	3.622 in (92 mm) × 3.346 in (85 mm)	3.465 in (88 mm) × 3.106 in (78.9 mm)	3.799 in (96.5 mm) × 3.732 in (94.8 mm)
Displacement	275.8 cu in (4,520 cc)	234.3 cu in (3,839 cc)	338.5 cu in (5,547 cc)
Fuel feed	Fuel injection: Bosch D-Jetronic · later K-Jetronic with Lambda · KE-Jetronic		
Fuel tank capacity	23.8 US gal (90 L) · from 1985: 22.5 US gal (85 L)		
Valvetrain	SOHC · 1981-1983: single chain · all others: duplex chain		
Cooling	Water		
Compression Ratio	8.0: 1	8.3: 1	9.0: 1
Max. Power @ rpm	190 hp (142 kW) @ 4750 later 180 hp (134 kW) @ 4750	155 hp (116 kW) @ 4750	227 hp (169 kW) @ 5200
Max. Torque @ rpm	240 lb⋅ft (325 N⋅m) @ 3000 later 220 lb⋅ft (298 N⋅m) @ 3000	196 lb⋅ft (266 N⋅m) @ 2750	287 lb⋅ft (389 N⋅m) @ 3500
Gearbox	3-speed automatic	4-speed automatic	
Automatic model automatic type	W3A 040 · later W3B 050; 722.0	W4A 040; 722.3	
Transmission	rear wheel drive		
Electrical system	12 volt		
Front Suspension	Independent, double wishbones, torsion anti-roll bar, anti-dive device		
Front Suspension	Coil and additional rubber springs		
Rear Suspension	Independent, semi-trailing arm ("diagonal swing axle"), torsion anti-roll bar		
Rear Suspension	—		Anti-squat device
Rear Suspension	Coil springs		
Brakes	Disc brakes (Ø front/rear: 10.9 in (278 mm)/11.0 in (279 mm) · from 1985: 11.2 in (284 mm)/11.0 in (279 mm)) power assisted · later ABS on request or standard		
Steering	Recirculating ball steering		
Track front · rear	57.2 in (1,452 mm) · 56.7 in (1,440 mm)		57.5 in (1,461 mm) · 57.7 in (1,465 mm)
Wheelbase	96.9 in (2,460 mm); 111.0 in (2,820 mm)		96.7 in (2,455 mm)
Body structure	Sheet steel · unibody construction		
Length	172.8 in (4,390 mm); 187.0 in (4,750 mm)	182.3 in (4,630 mm); 196.5 in (4,990 mm)	180.3 in (4,580 mm)
Width	70.5 in (1,790 mm)		
Height	50.8 in (1,290 mm); 52.4 in (1,330 mm)		
Curb weight	3,597 lb (1,632 kg); 3,625 lb (1,644 kg)	3,460 lb (1,569 kg) 3,440 lb (1,560 kg)	3,650 lb (1,656 kg)
Wheel size	6,5J × 14		7J × 15
Tire size	205/70 VR 14	205/70 HR 14	205/65 VR 15
Top speed	N/A		
Fuel consumption (estimates)	N/A		

== Motorsport ==
=== 450SLC 5.0 ===
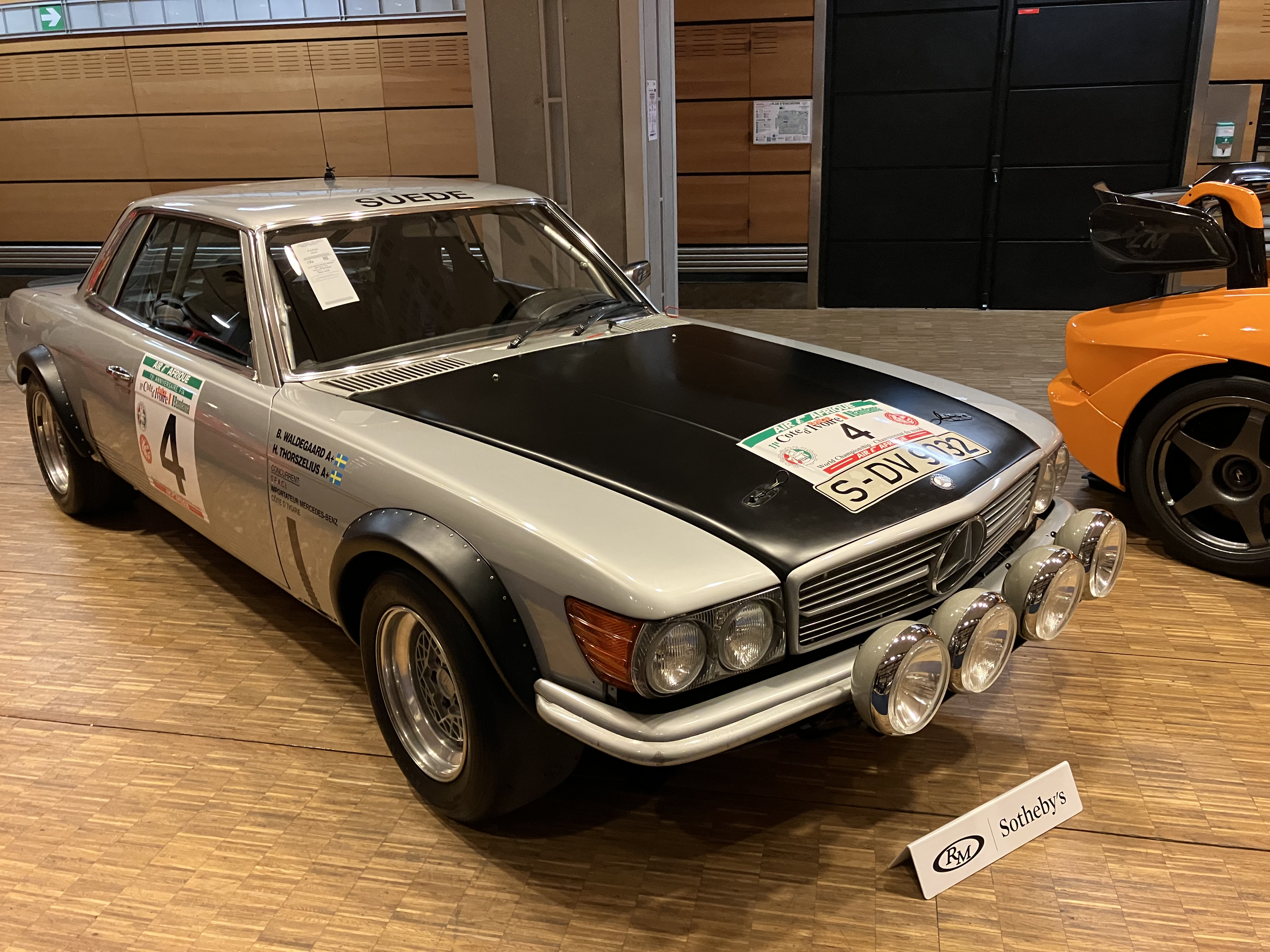
1979 Mercedes-Benz 450SLC 5.0

In 1978 the factory prepared two examples for the one-off Vuelta a la América del Sur, a month-long event of some 7,000 kilometres in length that took the competitors from Buenos Aires and back via Rio, Manaus, Caracas, Bogota, Lima, La Paz, Santiago and Ushuaia. The car driven by Andrew Cowan and Colin Malkin won by 20 minutes from team-mates Sobiesław Zasada and Andrzej Zembrzuski.

In 1979 a 5.0-litre 450SLC driven by Hannu Mikkola won the Bandama Rally in Côte d'Ivoire, with others finishing 2nd, 3rd and 4th. That same year the factory had used the 450SLC '5.0' to contest the Safari Rally, only narrowly missing out on victory because of suspension breakages. Nevertheless, the car driven by Hannu Mikkola finished 2nd.

Results in 1980 were worse, and the factory team was disbanded at the season's end. An Albert Pfuhl proceeded to buy all six cars, equipment, and spare parts from the works team. Pfuhl and his team built a series of cars to compete in the 1984 Paris–Dakar Rally with a white and blue "BOSS" livery. The cars finished well down the order.

== See also ==
- Mercedes-Benz SL-Class
