= Mercedes-Benz M115 engine =

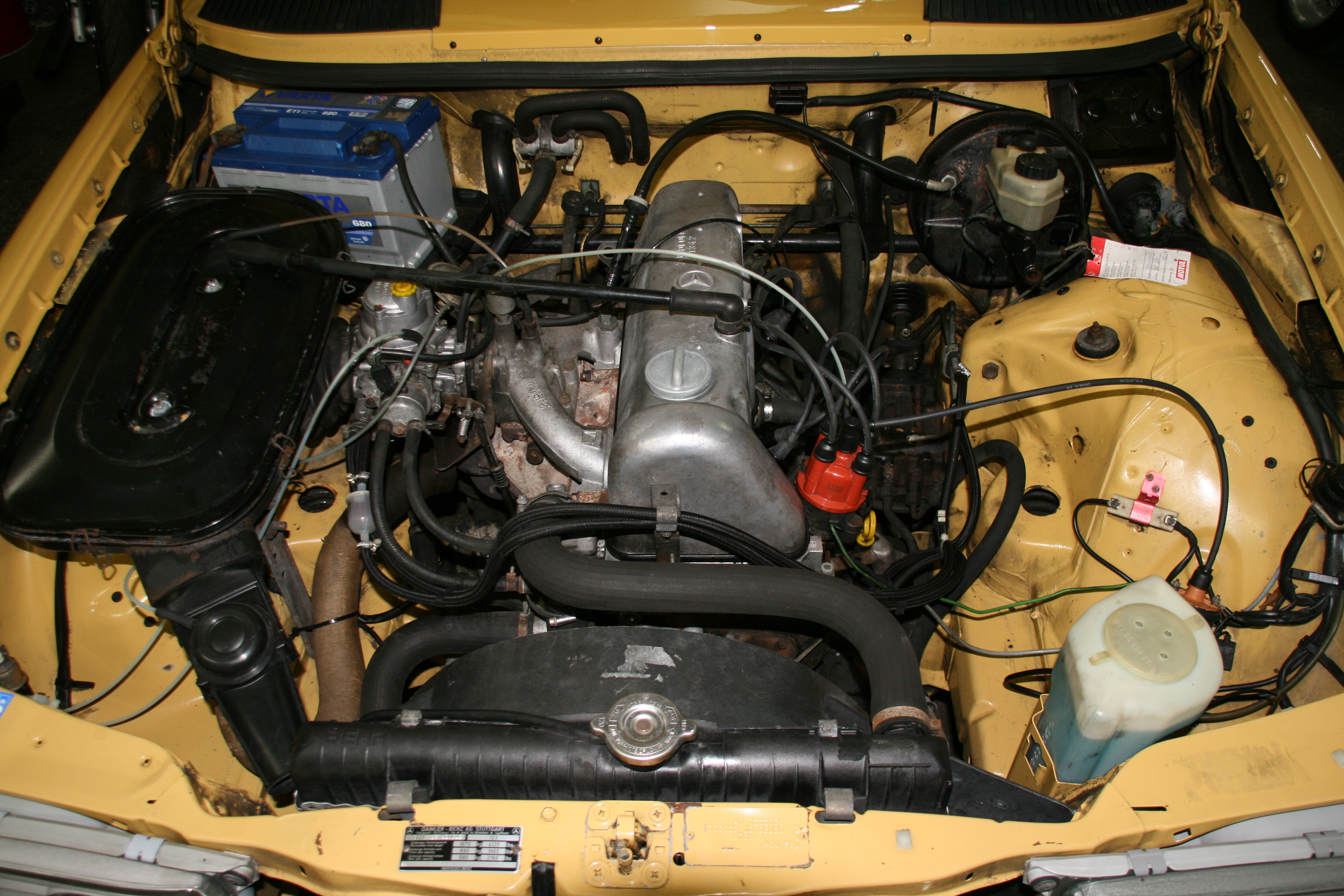

Overview
- Manufacturer: Mercedes-Benz
- Production: 1968–1985

Layout
- Configuration: Straight-4
- Displacement: 2.0 L (1,988 cc); 2.2 L (2,178 cc); 2.3 L (2,277 cc); 2.3 L (2,307 cc)
- Cylinder bore: 87 mm (3.43 in); 93.8 mm (3.69 in)
- Piston stroke: 83.6 mm (3.29 in); 92.4 mm (3.64 in)

Combustion
- Fuel type: Gasoline
- Cooling system: Water cooled

Output
- Power output: 85–120 hp (63–89 kW; 86–122 PS)

Chronology
- Predecessor: Mercedes-Benz M121 engine
- Successor: Mercedes-Benz M102 engine

The M115 engine family was a straight-4 automobile engine from Mercedes-Benz that was produced during the 1970s. This engine was a successor to the M121 and was replaced by the M102 engine. This engine differs from the M121 by its five-bearing crankshaft. The engine was produced in several versions with differing volume, compression, and horse power according to its application.

== Variants ==
=== M115.920 ===
The M115.920 is a 2.2 L (2,178 cc) engine with a power output of 103–105 hp (77–78 kW; 104–106 PS) and a bore and stroke of 87 mm × 92.4 mm (3.43 in × 3.64 in). This type shares the crankshaft with OM615 220D.

==== Applications ====
- 1968-1973 220 (W115.010) with oil radiator

=== M115.921 ===
The M115.921 is a 2.2 L (2,178 cc) 85 hp (63 kW; 86 PS) engine.

==== Applications ====
- L 408 G

=== M115.923 ===
The M115.923 is a 2.0 L (1,988 cc) 70 kW (95 PS; 94 hp) engine.

==== Applications ====
- 1968-1976 200 (W115.015)

=== M115.924 ===
The M115.924 is a 2.2 L (2,178 cc) engine, producing 90–120 hp (67–89 kW; 91–122 PS), depending on compression.

==== Applications ====
- 1968-1973 220

=== M115.926 ===
The M115.926 is a 2.2 L (2,178 cc) engine, producing 63–70 kW (86–95 PS; 84–94 hp), depending on compression.

==== Applications ====
- 1968-1977 220

=== M115.938 ===
The M115.938 is a 2.0 L (1,988 cc) engine with a bore and stroke of 87 mm × 83.6 mm (3.43 in × 3.29 in). Power output is 70 kW (95 PS; 94 hp).

==== Applications ====
- 1975-1980 200

=== M115.939 ===
The M115.939 is a 2.0-litre 84 hp (63 kW; 85 PS) engine with reduced compression, which follows from a different head.

==== Applications ====
- 1976-1980 200

=== M115.951 ===
The M115.951 is a 2.3-liter 110 hp (82 kW; 112 PS) engine.

==== Applications ====
- 1973-1979 230.4 (W115.017)

=== M115.952 ===
The M115.952 is a 2.3 L (2,277 cc) engine with 89 hp (66 kW; 90 PS).

==== Applications ====
- 409 LF Transporter

=== M115.954 ===
The M115.954 is a 2.3 L (2,307 cc) version with a 93.8 mm × 83.6 mm (3.69 in × 3.29 in) bore and stroke. Power output is 81 kW (110 PS; 109 hp).

=== Applications ===
- 1976-1981 230
- 1976-1981 230C
- 1976-1981 230T

=== M 115.973 ===
The M 115.973 is a 2.3 L (2,307 cc) version with a 93.8 mm × 83.6 mm (3.69 in × 3.29 in) bore and stroke. Power output is 67–93 kW (91–126 PS; 90–125 hp).

==== Applications ====
- 1979–1982 230 G
- 1972–1990 230 GE

== See also ==
- List of Mercedes-Benz engines
