= Mercedes-Benz W114/W115 =

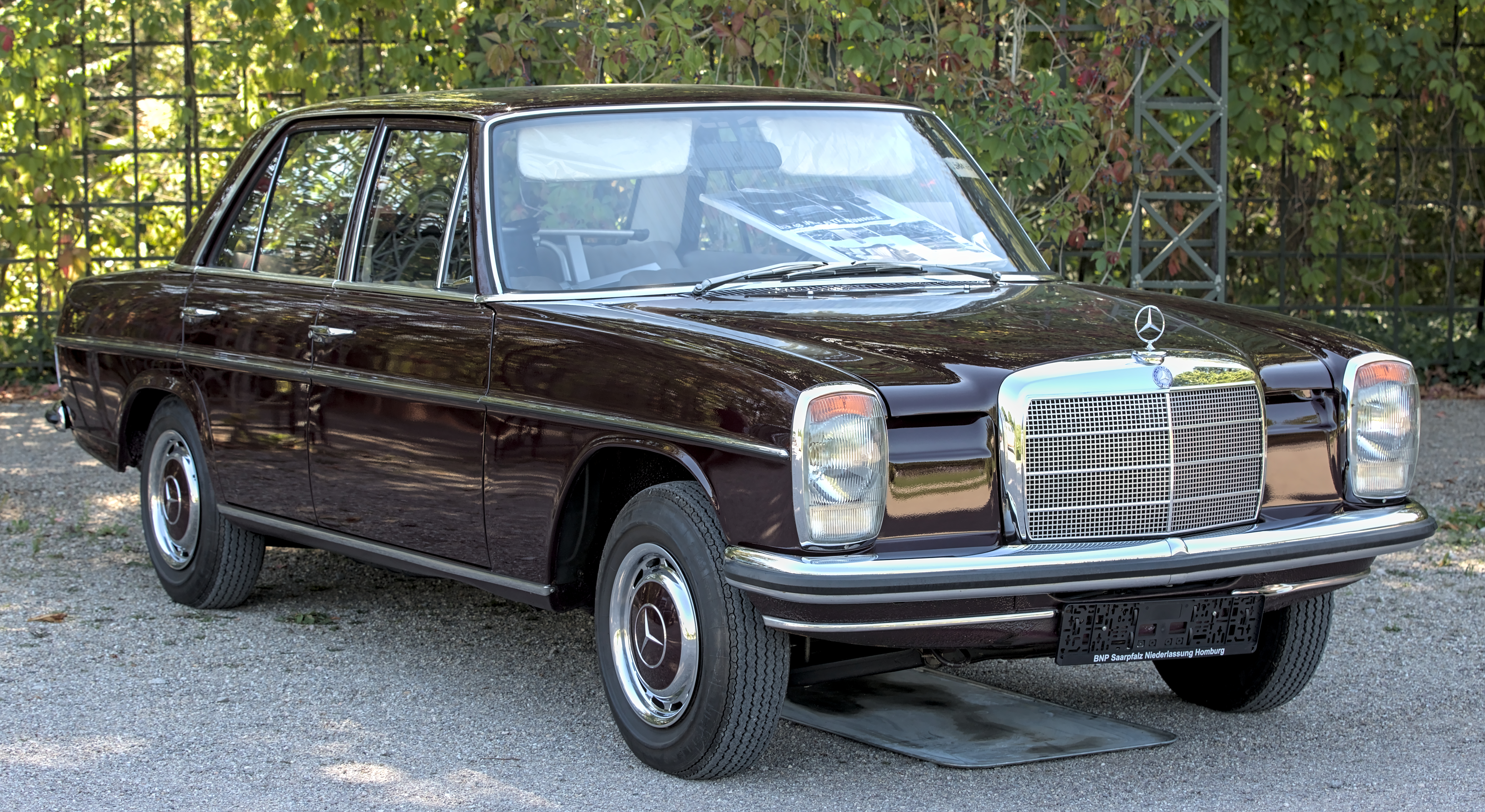
- Mercedes-Benz 220 D (pre-facelift)

Overview
- Manufacturer: Daimler-Benz
- Production: 1968–1976; 1,919,056 built; Saloon: 1,852,008; Coupé: 67,048
- Assembly: West Germany: Stuttgart; West Germany: Bremen; West Germany: Sindelfingen; South Africa: East London; Portugal: Setúbal (Movauto); Venezuela: Barcelona (CKD); Argentina: González Catán
- Designer: Paul Bracq

Body and chassis
- Class: Executive car (E); Grand tourer (W114/W115 Coupé)
- Body style: 4-door saloon; 2-door coupé; 4-door limousine
- Layout: FR layout
- Related: Mercedes-Benz W108/W109

Powertrain
- Engine: Petrol; 2.0 L M115 I4; 2.2 L M115 I4; 2.3 L M115 I4; 2.3 L M180 I6; 2.5 L M114 I6; 2.7 L M110 I6; 2.8 L M130 I6; Diesel; 2.0 L OM615 I4; 2.2 L OM615 I4; 2.4 L OM616 I4; 3.0 L OM617 I5
- Transmission: 4-speed 722.1 automatic; 4-speed 722.2 automatic

Dimensions
- Wheelbase: 2,750 mm (108.3 in); 3,400 mm (133.9 in) (limousine)
- Length: 4,680 mm (184.3 in); 4,970 mm (195.5 in) (US bumpers); 5,330 mm (209.8 in) (limousine)
- Width: 1,772 mm (69.75 in)
- Height: 1,441 mm (56.75 in)
- Curb weight: 1,350–1,465 kg (2,976.2–3,229.8 lb)

Chronology
- Predecessor: Mercedes-Benz W110
- Successor: Mercedes-Benz W123

The Mercedes-Benz W114 and W115 are ranges of front-engine, rear-drive, five-passenger executive cars and coupés introduced by West German automaker Mercedes-Benz in 1968 to succeed its W110 models introduced in 1961. Featuring squared-off modern three-box styling by Paul Bracq, they were manufactured until model year 1976, when the W123 was released.

W114/W115s were distinguished in the marketplace by nameplates relating to their engine displacement. W114 models featured six-cylinder engines and were marketed as the 230.6, 250, and 280. W115 models featured four-cylinder engines and were marketed as the 200, 220, 230.4, and 240, with diesel models carrying a D designation, as distinct from gasoline/petrol models.

When Mercedes introduced the W114/115 ranges in 1968 they were marketed as New Generation Models, ultimately the only to receive that designation.

Mercedes used a '/8' on the W114/115 ID plates, indicating their 1968 launch year, giving rise to their '/8' or 'slash eight' nicknames — and the German nickname Strich Acht, loosely translated into English as stroke eight.

== History ==
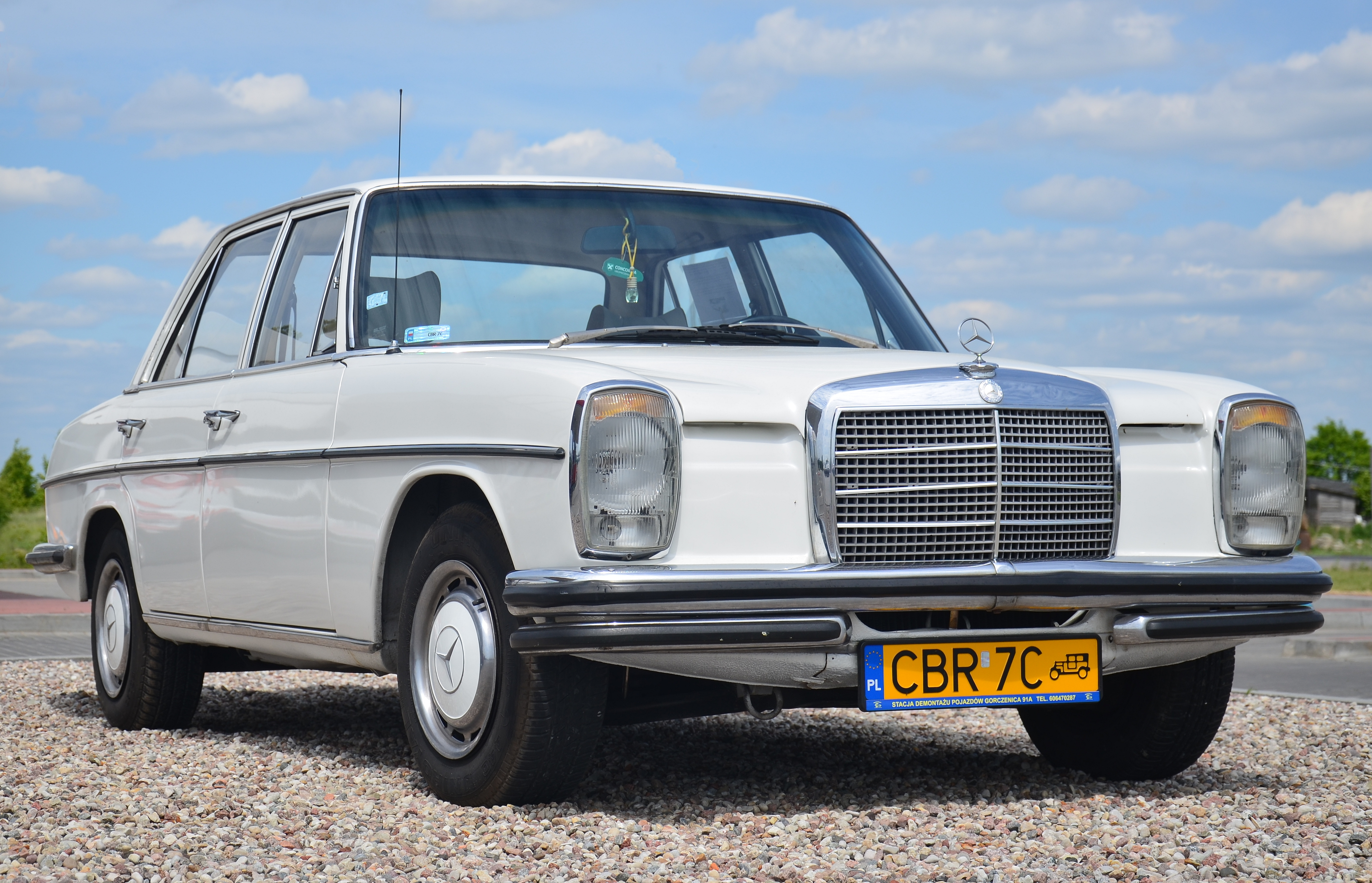
Pre-facelift Mercedes-Benz W115

The W114/W115 models were the first post-war Mercedes-Benz production cars to use a new suspension design. The semi-trailing rear arm and ball-joint front end format first displayed in the W114/W115 would be used in all new Mercedes passenger car models until the development of the multi-link rear suspensions of the 1980s. The W108/109 280 S /8, 280 SE /8 and 300 SEL /8 (and W113 230 SL, 250 SL, and 280 SL "Pagoda") would be the last of the low-pivot swing axle and king pin/double wishbone front ends. The first S-Class, the W116, had the same engineering as the W114/115, but used a larger, separate platform.

The Mercedes-Benz W114/W115 was the mid-sized saloon model for Mercedes, positioned below the W116. Mercedes also launched its first 5-cylinder diesel engine OM617 in this chassis. It followed heavily in the direction set by the W108/109 launched in 1965 and heralded the new design idiom of Paul Bracq, chief designer at Mercedes-Benz from 1957 to 1967.

Mercedes introduced a coupé variant of the W114 in 1969, featuring a longer boot lid and available with either a 2.5 or 2.8 litre six-cylinder engine. Its pillarless design allowed all the windows to be lowered completely for open air motoring. A total of 67,048 coupés were manufactured from 1969 to 1976 (vs. 1,852,008 saloons). Of these 24,669 were 280C and 280CE (top of the range), and 42,379 were 250 C and 250 CE

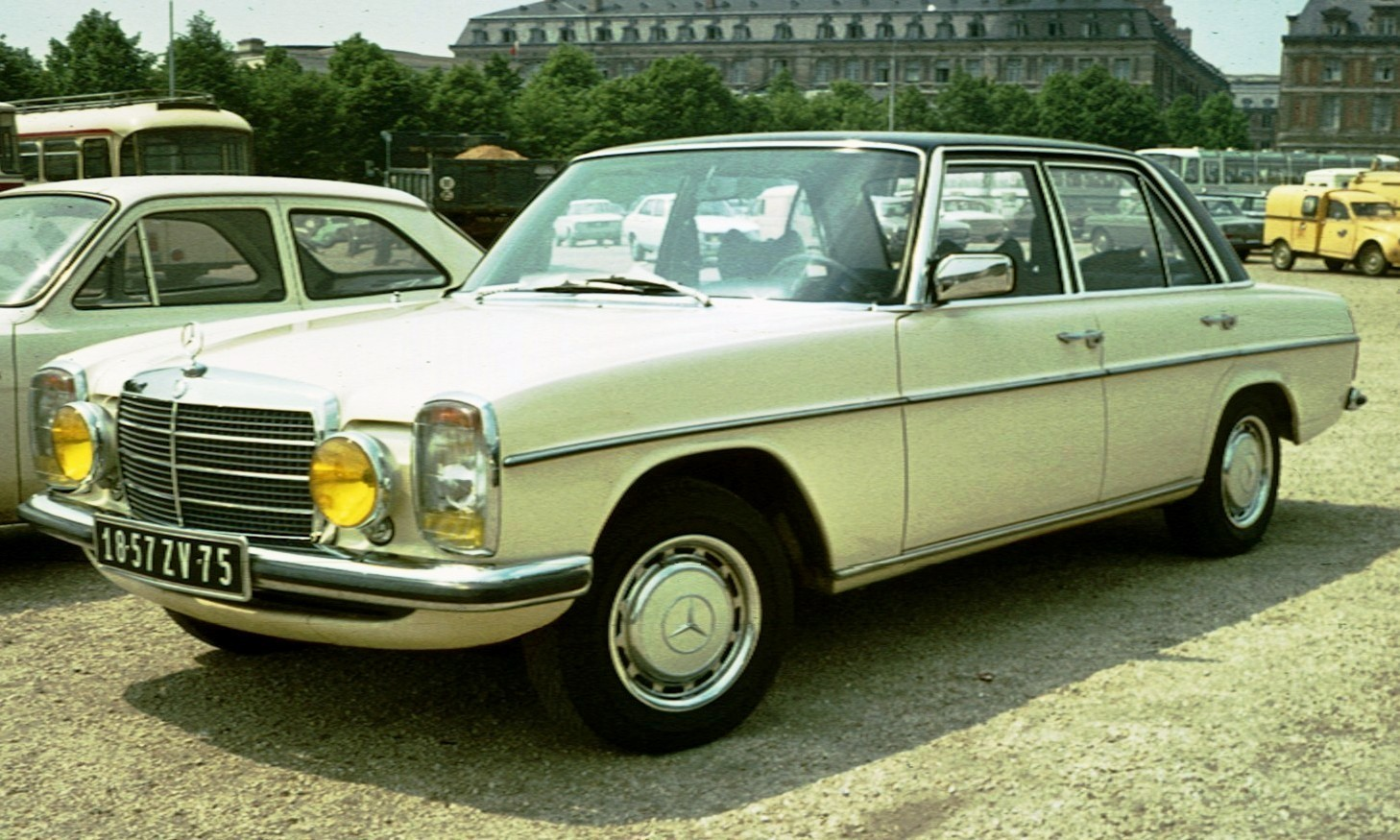
Mercedes-Benz 250 (W114) saloon: This post-facelift version is distinguished by a lower and wider radiator grille and differing treatment below the single front bumper/fender.

The W114 received a facelift in August 1973 – with a lower bonnet-line, lower and broader grille, a single front bumper to replace the double bumpers, lower placement of the headlamps, A-pillar treatment for keeping the side windows clear, removal of the quarter-windows in the front doors, ribbed tail lights to minimize occlusion of the tail lights with road dirt, and larger side mirrors. The interior received inertia reel seatbelts and a new padded steering wheel with a four-spoke design.

The Mercedes-Benz W115 is known to be a very durable car. In 2004 Greek taxi driver Gregorios Sachinidis donated his 1976 Mercedes-Benz 240 D to the Mercedes-Benz Museum Collection with 4.6 million kilometres (2.9 million miles) on the odometer, which is recognised as the Mercedes-Benz with the highest recorded mileage known to date.

== Innovations ==
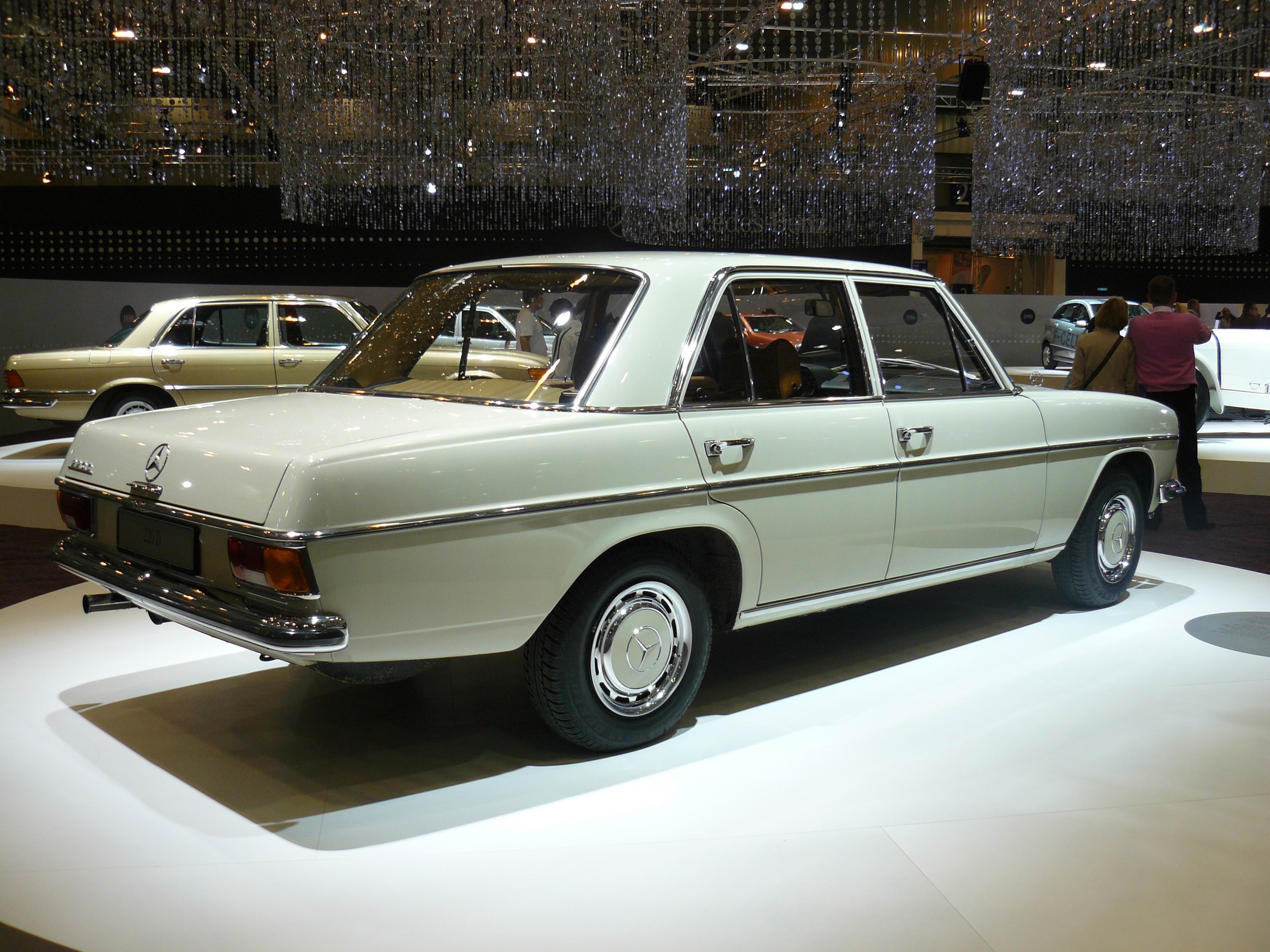
Mercedes Benz W115 220 D 1969

In 1968, the first fully electronic fuel injection system, Bosch D-Jetronic, was fitted to the W114/W115: first Mercedes-Benz model to be fitted with this system was 250 CE to be followed by 280 CE. The W114/W115 were first Mercedes-Benz model to have full centre console from the dashboard to the tunnel housing. The centre console houses the radio, ashtray and cigarette lighter, storage bins, gear selector, and optional power window switches. The W114/W115 was also first Mercedes-Benz model to be sold in the US market to have the headlamp washers and wipers as extra-cost option. A very rare option that Mercedes-Benz would not offer the headlamp washers and wipers for the US versions until 1986 model year for S-Class (W126/C126) and 300 Series (W124/C124).

== North America ==
1973 Mercedes-Benz W115 220 D with US-spec headlights and corresponding side markers and reflectors

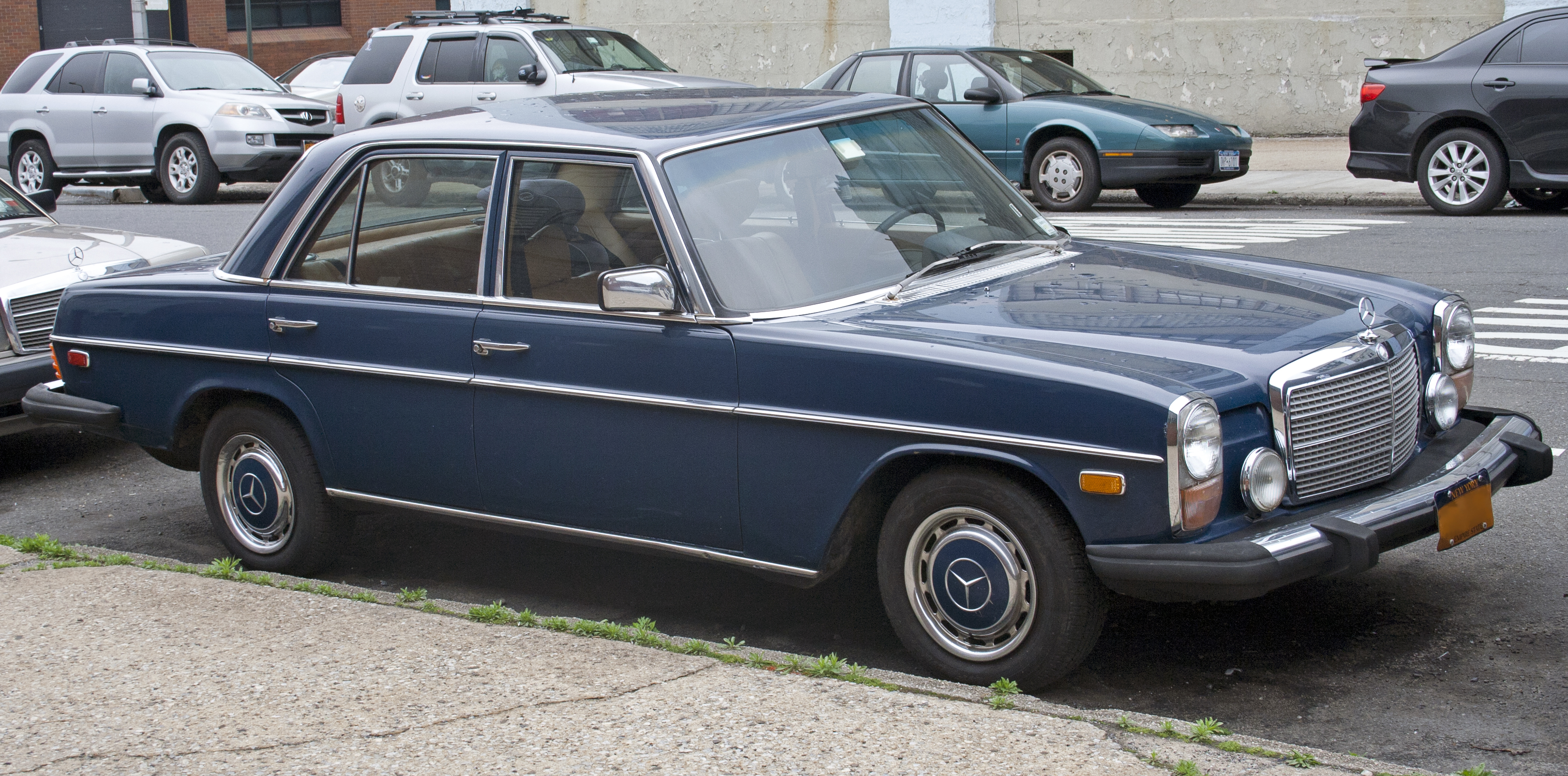
1975 Mercedes-Benz W114 280, with US-spec bumpers and sealed-beam headlights

For 1968 MY, Mercedes-Benz offered the W115 220 and 220 D and the W114 230. Those models replaced the previous generation W110 200, 200 D, and 230. The external changes to the US model were the headlamps that housed the sealed beam headlamps and the larger turn signal indicators below the headlamps in place of the integrated fog lamps, inside the bezel of the European models. The fog lamps were separate units attached to the top of bumpers between the headlamps and cooling grille. The side running lamps and retro-reflective markers were attached to the front and rear fenders.

For 1970 MY, the emission regulations led to changes in engine options due to the reduced performance. The 230 with six-cylinder M180 engine was superseded by the 250 with 2.5-litre M114 engine. This car was offered with 4-speed automatic transmission only. Manual transmission option would be eliminated for the 220 with the four-cylinder M115 engine in the following model year. This coincided with release of the W114 Coupe in mid-1969. In Europe it was available as the 250 C and 250 CE with the new D-Jetronic system, but this was not made available for the United States. Instead, a middle ground was chosen by giving a larger displacement 2.8 litre M130 motor, whilst keeping the '250' badging.

For 1971 MY, the 220 with four-cylinder M115 engine was available with automatic transmission only. Also for 1971 Mercedes-Benz replaced the M114 engine with the larger 2.8-litre M130 engine as to compensate for the small performance loss in the 250 sedan.

For 1973 MY, the bumpers had the front bumper guards and secondary bumpers from coupé models. When the bumper regulations were changed in 1974, the W114/W115 received massive 5-mph "battle ram" bumpers. Their heavy weight affected the performance and dynamism of W114/W115. The further changes to the emission regulations led to the replacement of M130 engine with DOHC 2.7-litre M110 six-cylinder engines, replacing the 250 and 250 C with the 280 and 280 C.

A major facelift of W114/W115 in 1974 also changed the engine and transmission options. The 220 was replaced by 230 with M115 engine enlarged to 2.3 litres. For the US market, Mercedes-Benz did not use 230.4 designation as the 2.3-litre six-cylinder engine wasn't offered in the US (The European market had both 230.4 and 230.6 as to differentiate between four and six cylinders). The 220 D with 2.2-litre OM615 diesel engine was superseded by 240 D with larger 2.4-litre OM616 diesel engine and was the only Mercedes-Benz model still available with the manual transmission option.

For 1975 MY, a new engine option, 3-litre OM617 diesel engine with five cylinders was offered in the United States as 300 D. The European model used 240 D 3.0 designation. During 1976, the final year for W114/W115 in the US, the model range was 230, 240 D, 280, 280 C, and 300 D, before being replaced by the W123 in 1976 for 1977 model year.

Given the ever stringent emission control in USA, the cars' performance became significantly handicapped as engines struggled to meet regulations whilst mandatory equipment and 5 mph bumpers would see a continuous increase in their weight. For example the carburettor fed 1973 M110 engine made 160 hp at 5500 RPM and 226 Nm at 4000 under the net DIN rating (180 hp / 248 Nm at 5750/4250 RPM per SAE gross rating) in Europe. The corresponding American export made 132 hp at 5000 and 203 Nm at 3500 SAE net. By 1975 this would collapse to 122 hp at 4800 and 194 Nm at 2800 SAE net. In parallel the 280C's curb weight rose from 1490 kg in 1973 to 1510 in 1974 and finally to 1565 kg for 1975-76. The European 280C remained at 1455 kg from 1973-76.

== Models ==
=== W114 ===
Model	Model Number	Years	Configuration	Displacement	Compression Ratio	Power	Torque	0–100 km/h (0–62 mph)(Manual/Auto)	Top speed (Manual/Auto)	Fuel consumption	Number produced	Notes
Petrol engines
230	114.015	01/1968–08/1973	I6 (M180.954)	2,292 cc (139.9 cu in)	9.0:1	88 kW (120 PS; 118 hp) at 5,400	178 N⋅m (131 lb⋅ft) at 3,600	13.3/13.9 seconds	175 km/h (109 mph) / 170 km/h (106 mph)	11.2 L/100 km (21.0 mpg_{‑US})	152,822	
230 Long	114.017	01/1968–07/1973	I6 (M180.954)	2,292 cc (139.9 cu in)	9.0:1	88 kW (120 PS; 118 hp) at 5,400	178 N⋅m (131 lb⋅ft) at 3,600	14/16.1 seconds	175 km/h (109 mph) / 170 km/h (106 mph)	11.2 L/100 km (21.0 mpg_{‑US})	1,082	
230.6	114.614	09/1973–11/1976	I6 (M180.954)	2,292 cc (139.9 cu in)	9.0:1	88 kW (120 PS; 118 hp) at 5,400	178 N⋅m (131 lb⋅ft) at 3,600	13.3/13.9 seconds	175 km/h (109 mph) / 170 km/h (106 mph)	11.2 L/100 km (21.0 mpg_{‑US})	63,497	
230.6 Long	114.617	08/1973–10/1976	I6 (M180.954)	2,292 cc (139.9 cu in)	9.0:1	88 kW (120 PS; 118 hp) at 5,400	178 N⋅m (131 lb⋅ft) at 3,600	14/16.1 seconds	175 km/h (109 mph) / 170 km/h (106 mph)	11.2 L/100 km (21.0 mpg_{‑US})	1,131	
250	114.010	12/1967–05/1972	I6 (M114.920)	2,596 cc (158.4 cu in)	9.0:1	96 kW (131 PS; 129 hp) at 5,400	199 N⋅m (147 lb⋅ft) at 3,600	12.8/12.9 seconds	180 km/h (112 mph) / 175 km/h (109 mph)	11.7 L/100 km (20.1 mpg_{‑US})	78,303	
250 C	114.021	10/1968–05/1972	I6 (M114.920)	2,596 cc (158.4 cu in)	9.0:1	96 kW (131 PS; 129 hp) at 5,400	199 N⋅m (147 lb⋅ft) at 3,600	12.8/12.9 seconds	180 km/h (112 mph) / 175 km/h (109 mph)	11.7 L/100 km (20.1 mpg_{‑US})	8,824	
250 CE	114.022	10/1968–05/1972	I6 (M114.980, fuel injection)	2,596 cc (158.4 cu in)	9.5:1	110 kW (150 PS; 148 hp) at 5,400	211 N⋅m (156 lb⋅ft) at 3,600	10.4/10.8 seconds	190 km/h (118 mph) / 185 km/h (115 mph)	11.7 L/100 km (20.1 mpg_{‑US})	21,787	
250 (2.8)	114.011	07/1970–08/1973	I6 (M130.923)	2,778 cc (169.5 cu in)	8.7:1	96 kW (131 PS; 129 hp) at 5,000	216 N⋅m (159 lb⋅ft) at 3,200	11.5/12.4 seconds	180 km/h (112 mph) / 175 km/h (109 mph)	12.5 L/100 km (18.8 mpg_{‑US})	22,624	For US market only until May 1972
250 (2.8)	114.611	08/1973–07/1976	I6 (M130.923)	2,778 cc (169.5 cu in)	8.7:1	96 kW (131 PS; 129 hp) at 5,000	216 N⋅m (159 lb⋅ft) at 3,200	11.5/12.4 seconds	180 km/h (112 mph) / 175 km/h (109 mph)	12.5 L/100 km (18.8 mpg_{‑US})	11,437	For US market only until May 1972
250 C (2.8)	114.023	07/1969–08/1973	I6 (M130.923)	2,778 cc (169.5 cu in)	8.7:1	96 kW (131 PS; 129 hp) at 5,000	216 N⋅m (159 lb⋅ft) at 3,200	11.5/12.4 seconds	180 km/h (112 mph) / 175 km/h (109 mph)	12.5 L/100 km (18.8 mpg_{‑US})	10,257	For US market only until May 1972
250 C (2.8)	114.623	08/1973–07/1976	I6 (M130.923)	2,778 cc (169.5 cu in)	8.7:1	96 kW (131 PS; 129 hp) at 5,000	216 N⋅m (159 lb⋅ft) at 3,200	11.5/12.4 seconds	180 km/h (112 mph) / 175 km/h (109 mph)	12.5 L/100 km (18.8 mpg_{‑US})	1,241	For US market only until May 1972
280	114.060	05/1972–08/1973	I6 (M110.921)	2,746 cc (167.6 cu in)	9.0:1	118 kW (160 PS; 158 hp) at 5,800	226 N⋅m (167 lb⋅ft) at 4,000	10.6/11,3 seconds	190 km/h (118 mph) / 185 km/h (115 mph)	12.5 L/100 km (18.8 mpg_{‑US})	19,537	
280	114.660	08/1973–09/1976	I6 (M110.921)	2,746 cc (167.6 cu in)	9.0:1	118 kW (160 PS; 158 hp) at 5,800	226 N⋅m (167 lb⋅ft) at 4,000	10.6/11,3 seconds	190 km/h (118 mph) / 185 km/h (115 mph)	12.5 L/100 km (18.8 mpg_{‑US})	25,000	
280 C	114.073	06/1972–08/1973	I6 (M110.921)	2,746 cc (167.6 cu in)	9.0:1	118 kW (160 PS; 158 hp) at 5,800	226 N⋅m (167 lb⋅ft) at 4,000	10.6/11,3 seconds	190 km/h (118 mph) / 185 km/h (115 mph)	12.5 L/100 km (18.8 mpg_{‑US})	4,924	
280 C	114.673	08/1973–09/1976	I6 (M110.921)	2,746 cc (167.6 cu in)	9.0:1	118 kW (160 PS; 158 hp) at 5,800	226 N⋅m (167 lb⋅ft) at 4,000	10.6/11,3 seconds	190 km/h (118 mph) / 185 km/h (115 mph)	12.5 L/100 km (18.8 mpg_{‑US})	8,227	
280 E	114.062	04/1972–08/1973	I6 (M110.981, DOHC, fuel injection)	2,746 cc (167.6 cu in)	9.0:1	136 kW (185 PS; 182 hp) at 6,000	238 N⋅m (176 lb⋅ft) at 4,500	9.9/10.8 seconds	200 km/h (124 mph) / 195 km/h (121 mph)	12.5 L/100 km (18.8 mpg_{‑US})	13,711	
280 E	114.662	08/1973–09/1976	I6 (M110.981, DOHC, fuel injection)	2,746 cc (167.6 cu in)	9.0:1	136 kW (185 PS; 182 hp) at 6,000	238 N⋅m (176 lb⋅ft) at 4,500	9.9/10.8 seconds	200 km/h (124 mph) / 195 km/h (121 mph)	12.5 L/100 km (18.8 mpg_{‑US})	9,125	
280 CE	114.072	05/1972–08/1973	I6 (M110.981, DOHC, fuel injection)	2,746 cc (167.6 cu in)	9.0:1	136 kW (185 PS; 182 hp) at 6,000	238 N⋅m (176 lb⋅ft) at 4,500	9.9/10.8 seconds	200 km/h (124 mph) / 195 km/h (121 mph)	12.5 L/100 km (18.8 mpg_{‑US})	7,576	
280 CE	114.672	08/1973–12/1976	I6 (M110.981, DOHC, fuel injection)	2,746 cc (167.6 cu in)	9.0:1	136 kW (185 PS; 182 hp) at 6,000	238 N⋅m (176 lb⋅ft) at 4,500	9.9/10.8 seconds	200 km/h (124 mph) / 195 km/h (121 mph)	12.5 L/100 km (18.8 mpg_{‑US})	3,942	

=== W115 ===
Model	Model Number	Years	Configuration	Displacement	Compression Ratio	Power	Torque	0–100 km/h (0–62 mph)(Manual/Auto)	Top speed (Manual/Auto)	Fuel consumption	Number produced	Notes
Petrol engines
200	115.015	01/1968–08/1973	I4 (M115.923)	1,988 cc (121.3 cu in)	9.0:1	70 kW (95 PS; 94 hp) at 4,800	156 N⋅m (115 lb⋅ft) at 2,800	15.2/15.0 seconds	160 km/h (99 mph) / 155 km/h (96 mph)	10.9 L/100 km (21.6 mpg_{‑US})	175,242	
200	115.615	08/1973–12/1976	I4 (M115.926)	1,988 cc (121.3 cu in)	9.0:1	70 kW (95 PS; 94 hp) at 4,800	156 N⋅m (115 lb⋅ft) at 2,800	15.2/15.0 seconds	160 km/h (99 mph) / 155 km/h (96 mph)	10.9 L/100 km (21.6 mpg_{‑US})	113,543	
220	115.010	02/1968–08/1973	I4 (M115.920)	2,197 cc (134.1 cu in)	9.0:1	77 kW (105 PS; 103 hp) at 5,000	178 N⋅m (131 lb⋅ft) at 2,800	13.7/13.9 seconds	168 km/h (104 mph) / 163 km/h (101 mph)	11.1 L/100 km (21.2 mpg_{‑US})	128,398	
230.4	115.017	08/1973–12/1976	I4 (M115.951)	2,307 cc (140.8 cu in)	9.0:1	81 kW (110 PS; 109 hp) at 4,800	186 N⋅m (137 lb⋅ft) at 2,500	13.7/13.9 seconds	170 km/h (106 mph) / 165 km/h (103 mph)	11.4 L/100 km (20.6 mpg_{‑US})	87,609	230 for US market
Diesel engines
200 D	115.115	01/1968–08/1973	I4 (OM615.913)	1,988 cc (121.3 cu in)	21.0:1	40 kW (54 PS; 54 hp) at 4,200	113 N⋅m (83 lb⋅ft) at 2,400	31.0/33.2 seconds	130 km/h (81 mph) / 125 km/h (78 mph)	8.1 L/100 km (29 mpg_{‑US})	187,873	
200 D	115.715	08/1973–12/1976	I4 (OM615.913)	1,988 cc (121.3 cu in)	21.0:1	40 kW (54 PS; 54 hp) at 4,200	113 N⋅m (83 lb⋅ft) at 2,400	31.0/33.2 seconds	130 km/h (81 mph) / 125 km/h (78 mph)	8.1 L/100 km (29 mpg_{‑US})	152,054	
220 D	115.110	01/1968–08/1973	I4 (OM615.912)	2,197 cc (134.1 cu in)	21.0:1	44 kW (60 PS; 59 hp) at 4,200	126 N⋅m (93 lb⋅ft) at 2,400	28.1/29.1 seconds	135 km/h (84 mph) / 130 km/h (81 mph)	8.5 L/100 km (28 mpg_{‑US})	345,376	
220 D	115.715	08/1973–12/1976	I4 (OM615.912)	2,197 cc (134.1 cu in)	21.0:1	44 kW (60 PS; 59 hp) at 4,200	126 N⋅m (93 lb⋅ft) at 2,400	28.1/29.1 seconds	135 km/h (84 mph) / 130 km/h (81 mph)	8.5 L/100 km (28 mpg_{‑US})	67,453	
220 D Long	115.112	03/1968–07/1973	I4 (OM615.912)	2,197 cc (134.1 cu in)	21.0:1	44 kW (60 PS; 59 hp) at 4,200	126 N⋅m (93 lb⋅ft) at 2,400	29.4/30.0 seconds	135 km/h (84 mph) / 132 km/h (82 mph)	8.5 L/100 km (28 mpg_{‑US})	4,027	
240 D	115.117	08/1973–12/1976	I4 (OM616.916)	2,404 cc (146.7 cu in)	21.0:1	48 kW (65 PS; 64 hp) at 4,200	137 N⋅m (101 lb⋅ft) at 2,400	24.6/27.4 seconds	138 km/h (86 mph) / 133 km/h (83 mph)	9.5 L/100 km (25 mpg_{‑US})	126,148	
240 D Long	115.119	08/1973–12/1976	I4 (OM616.916)	2,404 cc (146.7 cu in)	21.0:1	48 kW (65 PS; 64 hp) at 4,200	137 N⋅m (101 lb⋅ft) at 2,400	25.9/28.1 seconds	138 km/h (86 mph) / 133 km/h (83 mph)	9.5 L/100 km (25 mpg_{‑US})	3,655	
240 D 3.0	115.114	10/1974–11/1976	I5 (OM617.910)	3,005 cc (183.4 cu in)	21.0:1	59 kW (80 PS; 79 hp) at 4,200	172 N⋅m (127 lb⋅ft) at 2,400	19.9/20.8 seconds	148 km/h (92 mph) / 143 km/h (89 mph)	9.5 L/100 km (25 mpg_{‑US})	53,690	300 D for US market

== See also ==
- Mercedes-Benz W110
- Mercedes-Benz W123
