= Mercedes-Benz M114 engine =

Mercedes-Benz M114

Overview
- Manufacturer: Mercedes-Benz
- Production: 1967–1972

Layout
- Configuration: straight-six
- Displacement: 2,497 cc (152.4 cu in)
- Cylinder bore: 82 mm (3.23 in)
- Piston stroke: 78.8 mm (3.10 in)
- Cylinder block material: Grey iron
- Cylinder head material: Aluminium
- Valvetrain: SOHC, 2 valves per cylinder

Combustion
- Fuel system: Dual two-barrel Zenith 35/40 INAT carburetors or Bosch D-Jetronic fuel injection system
- Fuel type: Gasoline
- Cooling system: Water-cooled

Output
- Power output: 96 kW (129 bhp; 131 PS)
- Torque output: 199 N⋅m (147 lb⋅ft)

Chronology
- Predecessor: M108
- Successor: M110

The Mercedes-Benz M114 is a straight-six single overhead camshaft gasoline powered automobile engine with dual two-barrel Zenith 35/40 INAT carburetors or with Bosch D-Jetronic fuel injection system. The engine has a displacement of 152.4 cu in (2,497 cc), develops 96 kW (129 bhp; 131 PS), and has a maximum speed of 6300 rpm with a 9:1 compression ratio.

== See also ==
- List of Mercedes-Benz engines
