= Mercedes-Benz GLE =

Mid-size luxury SUV

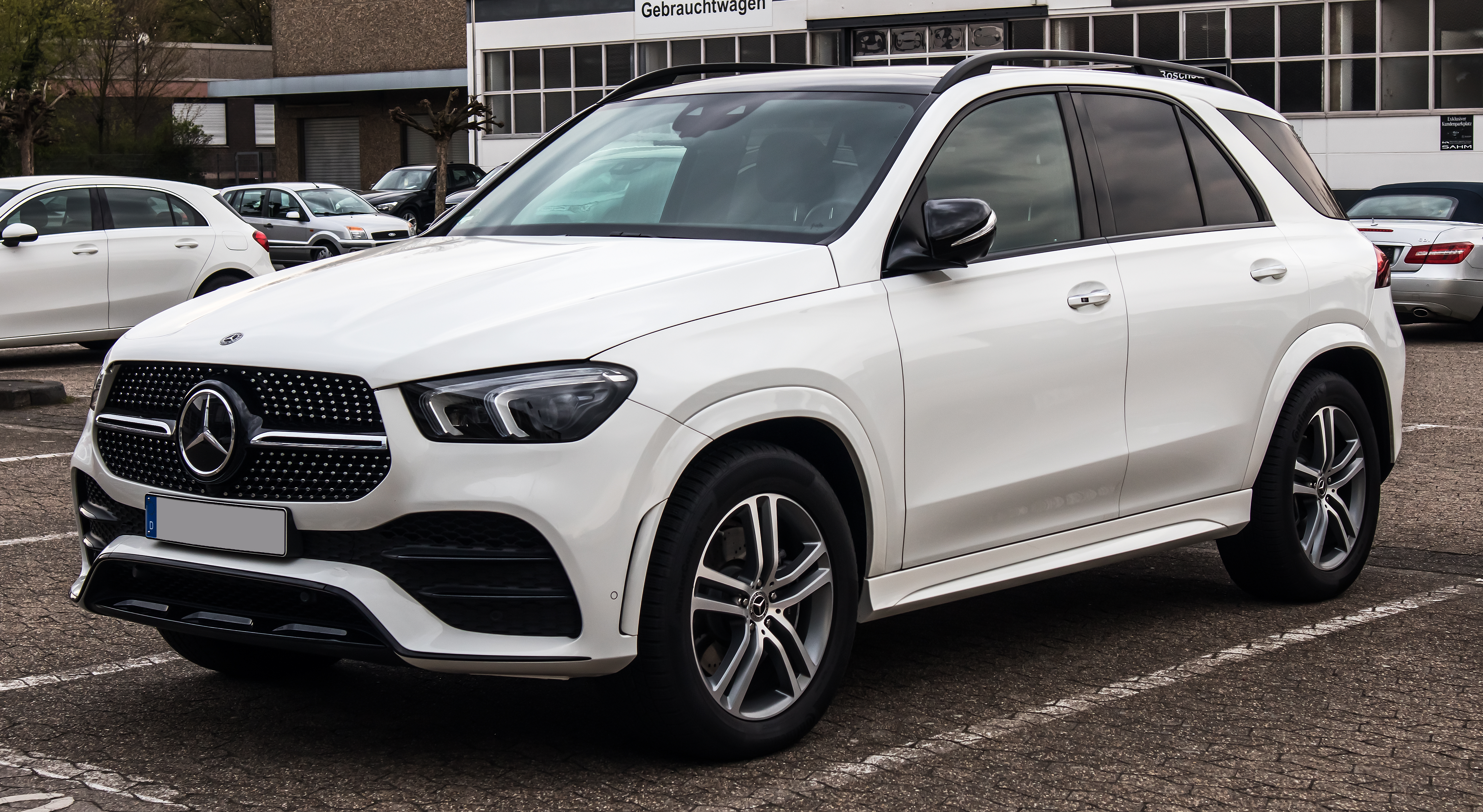
- 2021 GLE 350d 4MATIC AMG Line (V167)

Overview
- Manufacturer: Daimler-Benz (1997–1998); DaimlerChrysler (1998–2007); Daimler AG (2007–2022); Mercedes-Benz Group (2022–present)
- Also called: Mercedes-Benz M-Class (1997–2015)
- Production: 1997–2015 (M-Class); 2015–present (GLE)

Body and chassis
- Class: Mid-size luxury SUV (1997–2005); Mid-size luxury crossover SUV (2005–present)
- Layout: Front-engine, rear-wheel-drive or four-wheel-drive (4Matic)
- Chassis: Body-on-frame (1997–2005); Unibody (2005–present)

The Mercedes-Benz GLE, formerly Mercedes-Benz M-Class (designated with the "ML" nomenclature), is a mid-size luxury SUV produced by the German manufacturer Mercedes-Benz since 1997. In terms of size, it is slotted in between the smaller GLC and the larger GLS, the latter with which it shares platforms.

The first-generation M-Class, designated with the model code W163, is a body-on-frame SUV and was produced until 2004. The second-generation M-Class (W164) moved to a unibody platform while sharing most components with the GL-Class, which sports a longer body to accommodate third-row seating.

For a short time, between 1999 and 2002, the W163 M-Class was also built by Magna Steyr in Graz, Austria, for the European market, and the W166 M-Class from 2011 to 2015 was built in Stuttgart for the European and Australian market, before all production moved to the U.S. plant near Vance, Alabama in 2015 with the release of the facelifted W166 model, in an effort to harmonize Mercedes-Benz SUV nameplates by aligning it with the E-Class.

== Nomenclature changes ==
Although grouped under the "M-Class" naming banner since the first launch, BMW, who sells M models such as the M3, objected to the car being badged "M" with the three-digit engine level afterwards (e.g. M 320). This forced Mercedes-Benz to defer to a double-tiered marketing strategy of "ML" badging (e.g. ML 320) under an M-Class umbrella. There has been some confusion surrounding this nomenclature, with many sources erroneously referring to the series as the "ML-Class", including Mercedes-Benz itself.

From 2015, with the release of the facelifted W166 third-generation model at the New York Auto Show in April, the M-Class was renamed to GLE as per the revised nomenclature adopted by the brand. Under this scheme, SUVs use the base name "GL", followed by the model's placement in Mercedes-Benz hierarchy. The "G" is for Geländewagen (German for off land wagon or off-road vehicle) and alludes the long-running G-Wagen. This is followed by the letter "L" that acts as a linkage with the letter "E"—the GLE being the SUV equivalent to the E-Class.

== First generation (W163; 1997) ==
Mercedes-Benz M-Class (W163)
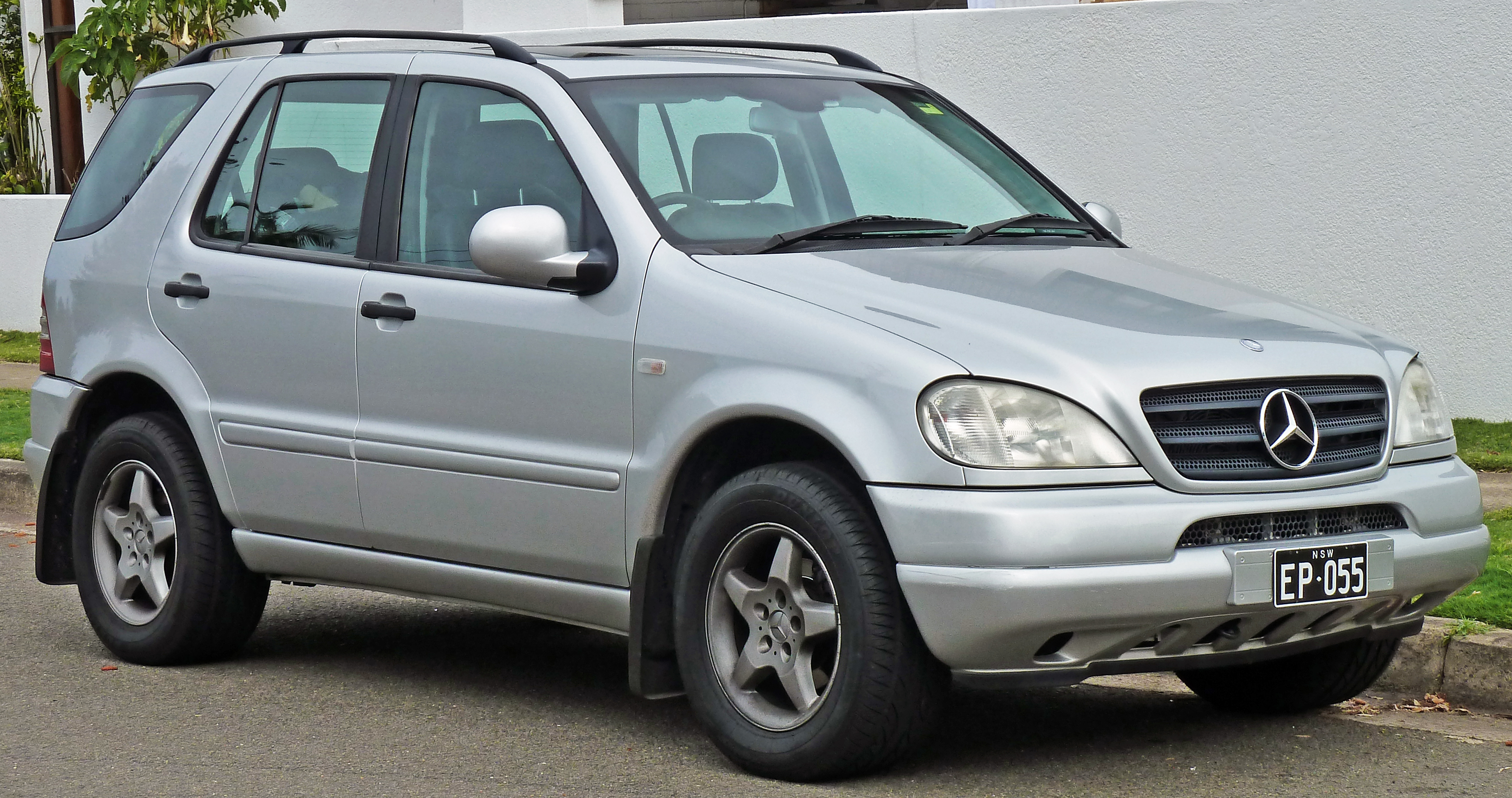
- 2000 ML 320 (pre-facelift)

Overview
- Model code: W163
- Production: February 1997 – December 2004
- Model years: 1998–2005
- Assembly: United States: Tuscaloosa, Alabama (MBUSI); Austria: Graz (Magna Steyr; 1999–2002)
- Designer: Bruno Sacco & Peter Pfeiffer (1993); Peter Arcadipane

Body and chassis
- Body style: 5-door SUV
- Chassis: Body-on-frame
- Related: SsangYong Rexton

Powertrain
- Engine: Gasoline: 2.3 L M111 I4; 3.2–3.7 L M112 V6; 4.3–5.4 L M113 V8; Diesel: 2.7 L OM612 turbo I5; 4.0 L OM628 turbo V8
- Transmission: 5-speed manual 5-speed 5G-Tronic automatic

Dimensions
- Wheelbase: 2,819 mm (111.0 in)
- Length: 1997–02: 4,587 mm (180.6 in); 2002–05: 4,638 mm (182.6 in); AMG: 4,636 mm (182.5 in)
- Width: 1997–02: 1,834 mm (72.2 in); 2002–05: 1,839 mm (72.4 in); AMG: 1,895 mm (74.6 in)
- Height: 1997–02: 1,775 mm (69.9 in); 2002–05: 1,821 mm (71.7 in); AMG: 1,760 mm (69.3 in)
- Curb weight: 2,093 kg (4,614 lb)

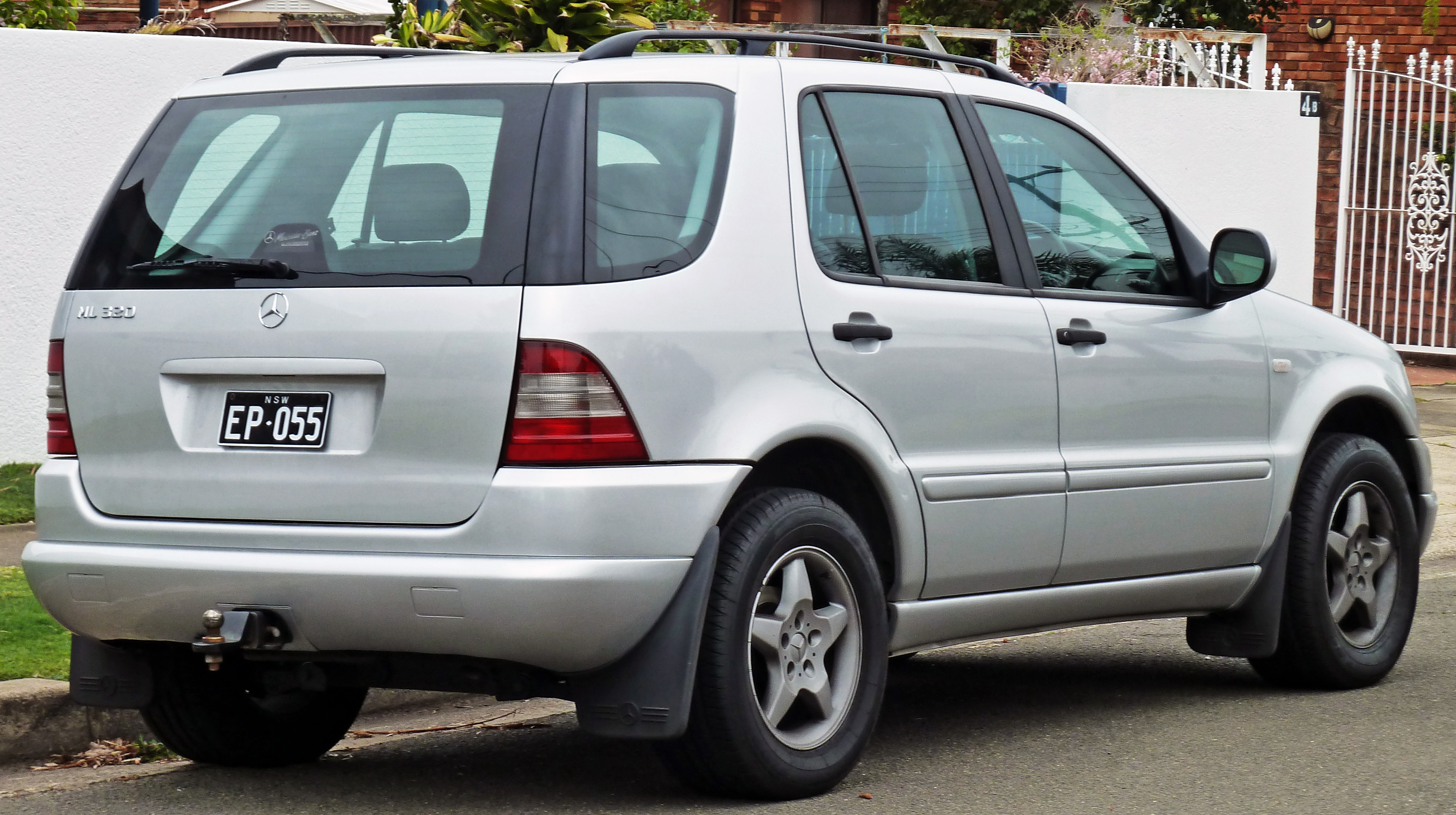
Pre-facelift Mercedes-Benz ML 320 (Australia)

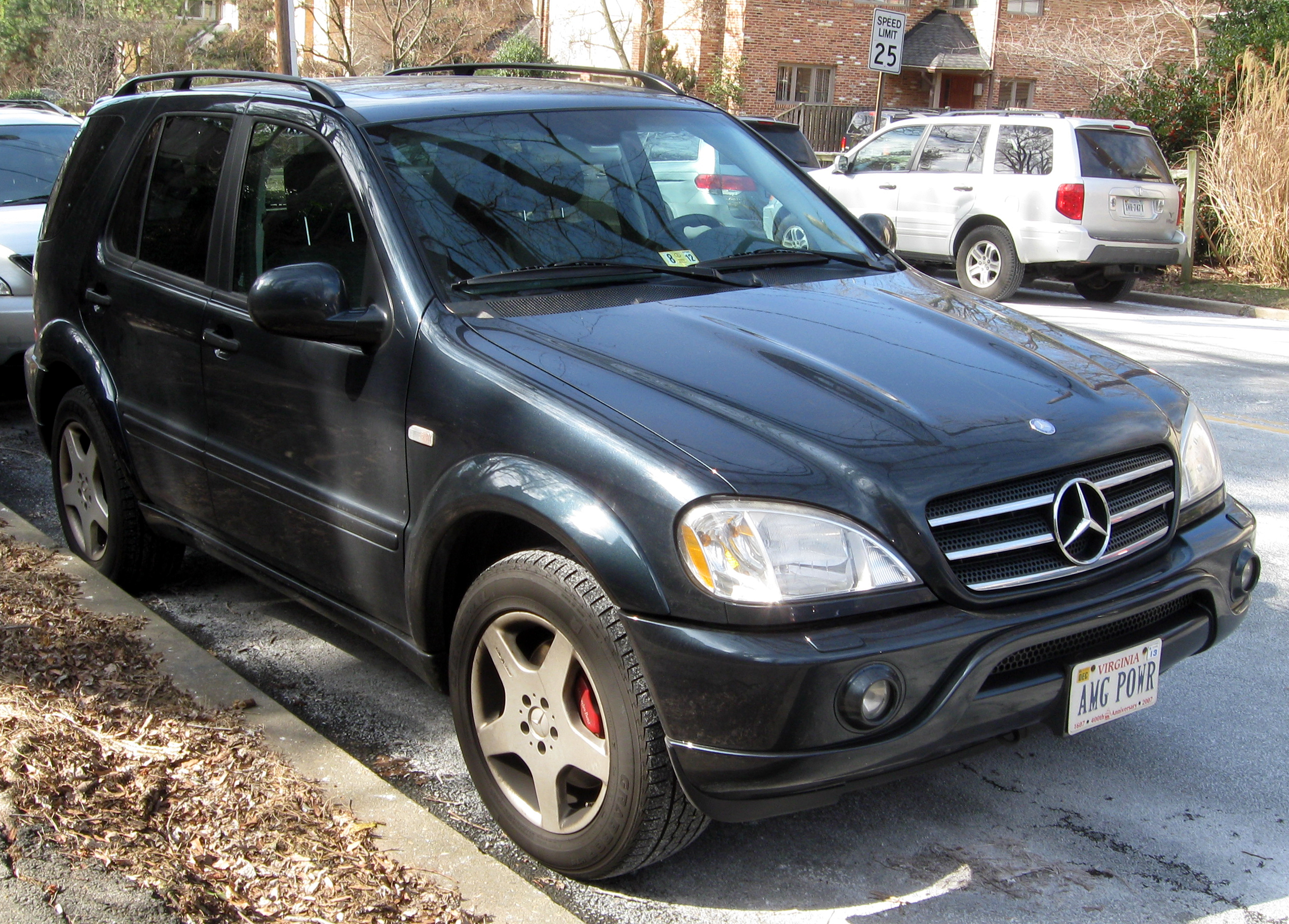
Mercedes-Benz ML 55 AMG (US)

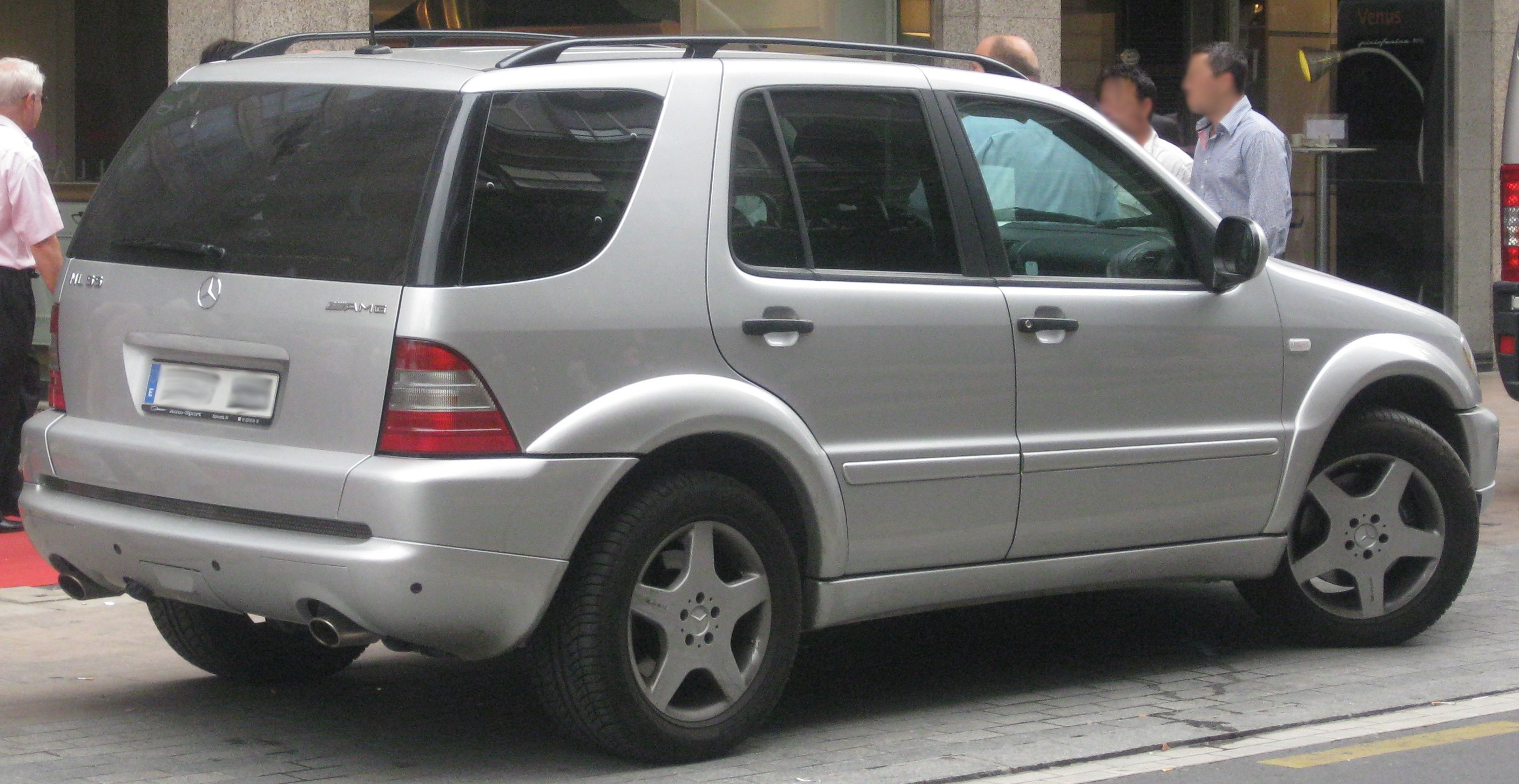
Mercedes-Benz ML 55 AMG (Europe)

=== Development ===
Mercedes-Benz proposed a plan to replace the G-Class, which at the time had been in production for 11 years. A joint agreement with Mitsubishi Motors to develop and produce a sports-utility vehicle was made in early 1991 and was confirmed publicly that June. Plans were made to base it on the Montero/Pajero platform, with one of them being badged as a Mercedes-Benz and the other a Mitsubishi. In May 1992, these plans were abandoned citing "technical problems" and Mercedes-Benz continued on with in-house development from January 1993.

In March 1993, a search for a location to build a U.S. manufacturing plant began. By September 1993, a location in the state of Alabama was chosen and construction started in 1994.

While plans were being made overseas, in Germany development continued. Design work took place from late 1992 to 1994. A design from Mercedes' Sindelfingen studio was chosen in 1993 and approved by the executive board in February 1994. The design patents were filed in Germany on 13 July 1994, and in the U.S. on 13 January 1995. Prototype testing started with test mules and crash tests using mock-ups in May 1994. First functional prototype's crash test took place in February 1995, with full testing run from March 1995 to December 1996 in various climates and regions of the world. Pilot production began in May 1996.

In July 1996, construction on the Mercedes-Benz U.S. International plant in Vance, Alabama concluded, with the very first production M-Class rolling off the assembly line the week of 9 February 1997.

=== Launch ===
Mercedes-Benz launched the first generation W163 series M-Class on 19 February 1997, in the United States for the 1998 model year, with sales beginning that September. It is a mid-sized body-on-frame SUV with seating for five, or seven with an optional third-row, seven-seat version. Access to the third-row was deemed problematic and the seats were not suitable for large adults. As a result, the seven seater M-Class was discontinued after the 2005 model year and replaced by the larger GL-Class.

The Mercedes-Benz M-Class (W163) was available with permanent 4Matic four-wheel drive, which routed torque to all four wheels through open front, center, and rear differentials. The system used a two-speed dual range BorgWarner 4409 transfer case with a planetary center differential that provides a 48% front/52% rear default torque split. The transfer case featured reduction gearing, and Mercedes' new Four-wheel Electronic Traction System (4-ETS). 4-ETS simulated three differential locks on all three open differentials, via aggressively braking one or more spinning wheels.

The M-Class was the first luxury SUV to feature electronic stability control, a system designed to detect loss of control and instantaneously intervene with selective braking to bring the vehicle back on its intended course. Furthermore, the M-Class featured front- and side-impact airbags with advanced occupant detection for the front passenger seat, which helped earn the W163 the highest marks in insurance industry crash tests.

Manufactured in Vance, Alabama, in the United States, the M-Class launched in the North American market first as the ML 320. The ML 320 was sold internationally, with the "320" suffix alluding to the 3.2-liter V6 engine. The engine has a power output of 218 PS (160 kW; 215 hp) and 315 N⋅m (232 lb⋅ft) of torque. An entry-level, manual transmission-only ML 230, fitted with a 2.3-liter inline-four was available in Europe from launch in March 1998 until 2000. From launch in 1998, European markets also received the ML 270 CDI with a 2.7-liter inline-five turbodiesel engine. This unit was made available in Australia in 2000 and continued on in the W163 until being replaced upon the release of the W164 M-Class in 2005.

Later, in 1998, the more powerful ML 430 became available with the newly introduced Mercedes-Benz 4.3-liter V8. This was followed by the February 1999 debut of the 2000 ML 55 AMG, featuring a 5.4-liter V8 engine made by AMG, modified bodywork, and other performance features.

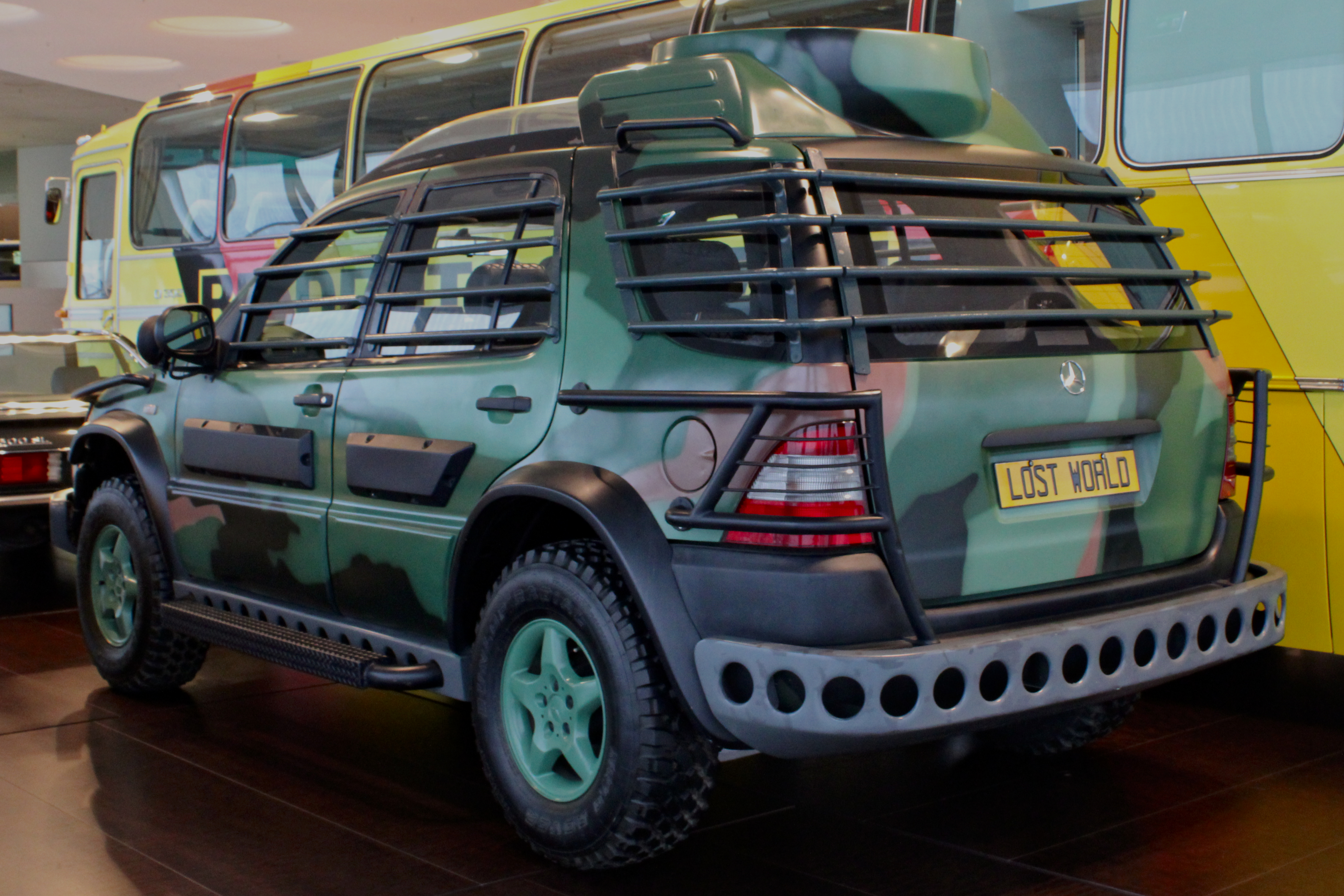
Mercedes-Benz ML 320 used in The Lost World: Jurassic Park in the Mercedes-Benz Museum.

In September 1996, before the vehicle was launched, Mercedes-Benz allowed the producers of the 1997 film The Lost World: Jurassic Park to make use of modified pre-production M-Class SUVs as a way to advertise the W163 when it was launched in 1997. As a result, a Mercedes-Benz advertisement appears before the film on original VHS copies of the film. Jeff Goldblum, the star of the film, received a complimentary ML 320 from Mercedes-Benz as a result of the tie-in. Three versions were used in the movie, two of which of each were built. Two are displayed at the Universal Studios in Orlando, Florida, there is one at the Mercedes-Benz Museum in Stuttgart, Germany, and one at the Visitor Center at the M-class factory in Alabama.

=== Awards ===
The ML 320 was Motor Trend magazine's Truck of the Year for 1998 and was voted the 1998 North American Truck of the Year at the North American International Auto Show, Detroit, in January 1998. It also received the World Car Award in March 1999, voted by an international jury of automotive journalists in Geneva. Despite the accolades, Mercedes-Benz received considerable criticism with respect to the substandard quality of the W163, resulting in the car being nicknamed Alabama Trashcan. Quality improved over the years, especially after the facelift in 2001 for the 2002 model year. DaimlerChrysler spent US$600 million (~$949 million in 2025) on improvements at the Alabama factory before launching the second generation ML in 2005.

=== Engines (1997–2005) ===
Model	Years	Displacement	Configuration	Power	Torque	0–100 km/h (0–62 mph)	Top speed
Gasoline engines
ML 230	1998–2001	2.3 L (2,295 cc)	inline-4	110 kW (150 PS; 148 hp)	220 N⋅m (162 lbf⋅ft)	12.8 seconds	180 km/h (112 mph)
ML 320	1998–2001	3.2 L (3,199 cc)	V6	160 kW (218 PS; 215 hp)	315 N⋅m (232 lbf⋅ft)	9.5 seconds	180 km/h (112 mph)
ML 320	2001–2002	3.2 L (3,199 cc)	V6	160 kW (218 PS; 215 hp)	315 N⋅m (232 lbf⋅ft)	9.0 seconds	195 km/h (121 mph)
ML 350	2002–2005	3.7 L (3,724 cc)	V6	173 kW (235 PS; 232 hp)	346 N⋅m (255 lbf⋅ft)	8.7 seconds	205 km/h (127 mph)
ML 430	1999–2001	4.3 L (4,266 cc)	V8	200 kW (272 PS; 268 hp)	400 N⋅m (295 lbf⋅ft)	8.4 seconds	210 km/h (130 mph)
ML 500	2001–2005	5.0 L (4,966 cc)	V8	215 kW (292 PS; 288 hp)	440 N⋅m (325 lbf⋅ft)	7.7 seconds	222 km/h (138 mph)
ML 55 AMG	2000–2001	5.4 L (5,439 cc)	V8	255 kW (347 PS; 342 hp)	510 N⋅m (376 lbf⋅ft)	6.9 seconds	232 km/h (144 mph)
ML 55 AMG	2002–2003	5.4 L (5,439 cc)	V8	255 kW (347 PS; 342 hp)	510 N⋅m (376 lbf⋅ft)	6.7 seconds	235 km/h (146 mph)
Diesel engines
ML 270 CDI	1998–2001	2.7 L (2,688 cc)	inline-5	120 kW (163 PS; 161 hp)	370 N⋅m (273 lbf⋅ft)	11.7 seconds	185 km/h (115 mph)
ML 270 CDI	2002–2005	2.7 L (2,688 cc)	inline-5	120 kW (163 PS; 161 hp)	370 N⋅m (273 lbf⋅ft)	12.2 seconds	185 km/h (115 mph)
ML 400 CDI	2001–2005	4.0 L (3,996 cc)	V8	184 kW (250 PS; 247 hp)	560 N⋅m (413 lbf⋅ft)	8.1 seconds	213 km/h (132 mph)

=== Facelift ===
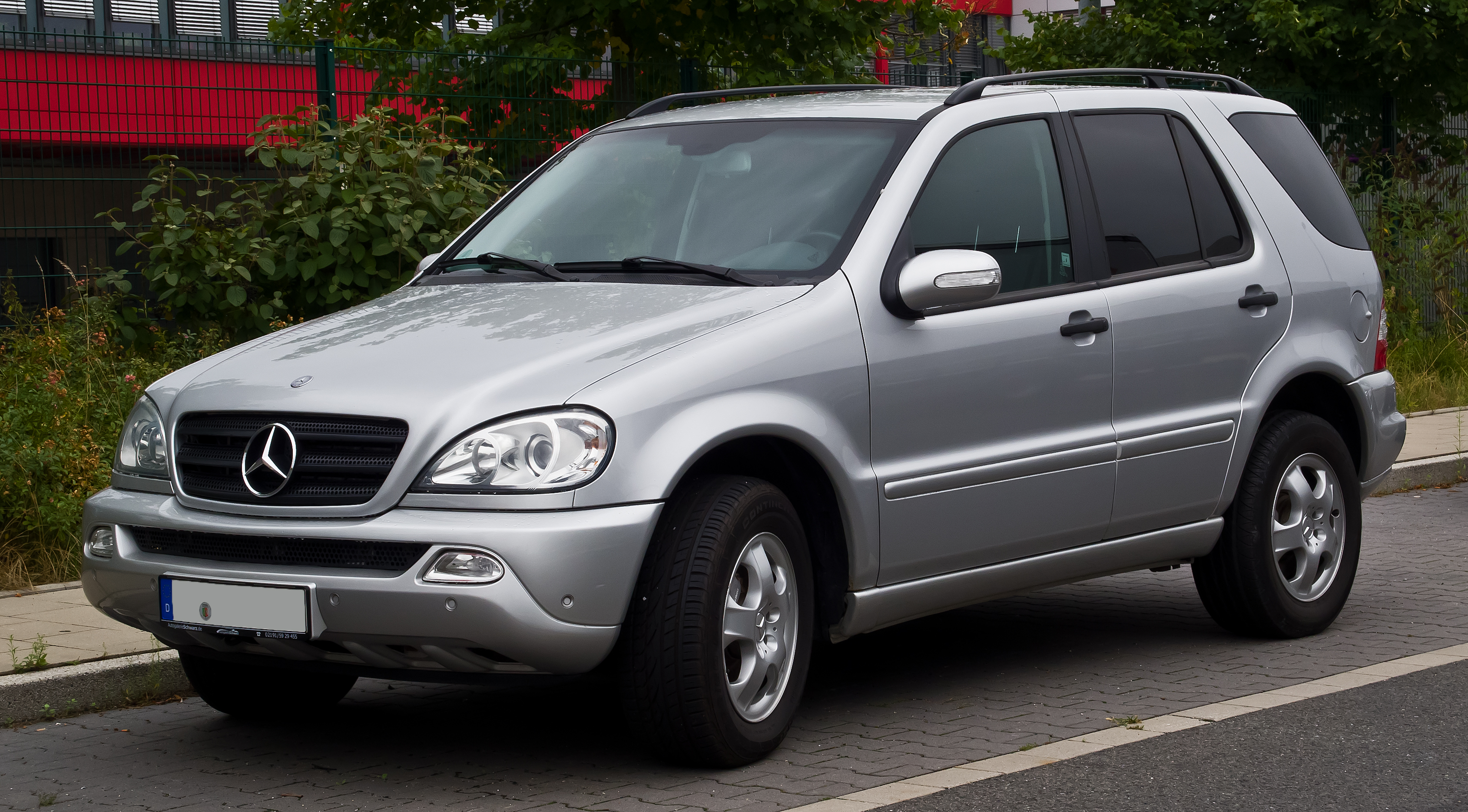

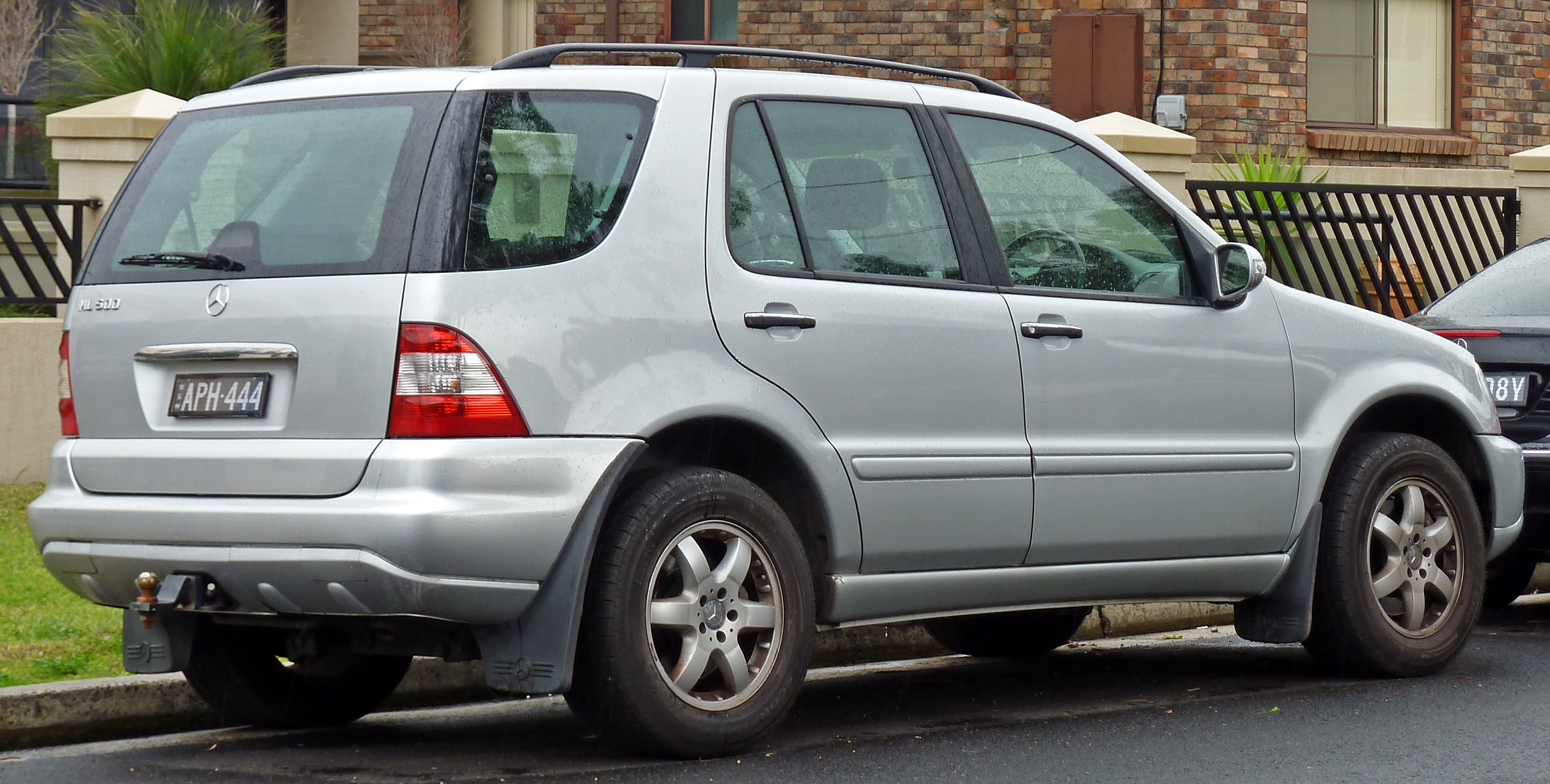
2001 facelift

Mercedes-Benz revised and updated the W163 in 2001 for the 2002 model year. Styling updates involved the fitment of new head- and tail-lamp lenses, front and rear bumpers, new alloy wheels on most variants, the relocation of the side turn signals from the fenders to the side-view mirrors, and various interior trim changes. At the same time, the ML 430 was replaced by the 5.0-liter V8-powered ML 500 and a new 4.0-liter V8 turbodiesel ML 400 CDI became available in Europe. The following year, in 2002, Mercedes-Benz launched the ML 350 fitted with a 3.7-liter V6 engine. The ML 350 replaced the ML 320 in some markets, but supplemented it in others.

The previous Popemobile was based on a W163 series ML 430 and has been in service since July 2002. Volkswagen had offered to build a new vehicle based on the Touareg, but Pope Benedict XVI opted to continue using his predecessor's Mercedes-Benz-manufactured vehicle.

=== Safety ===
==== Euro NCAP ====
Euro NCAP test results* Mercedes-Benz ML270 (2002)
Test	Score	Rating
Adult occupant:	30	4 /5 stars
Pedestrian:	4	1 /4 stars

==== IIHS ====
IIHS scores (1999 model year)
Moderate overlap front (original test)	Good

==== ANCAP ====
ANCAP test results* Mercedes-Benz M-Class (2002)
Test	Score
Overall	4 /5 stars
Frontal offset	9.64/16
Side impact	16/16
Pole	2/2
Seat belt reminders	2/3
Whiplash protection	Not Assessed
Pedestrian protection	Poor
Electronic stability control	Standard

== Second generation (W164; 2005) ==
Mercedes-Benz M-Class (W164)
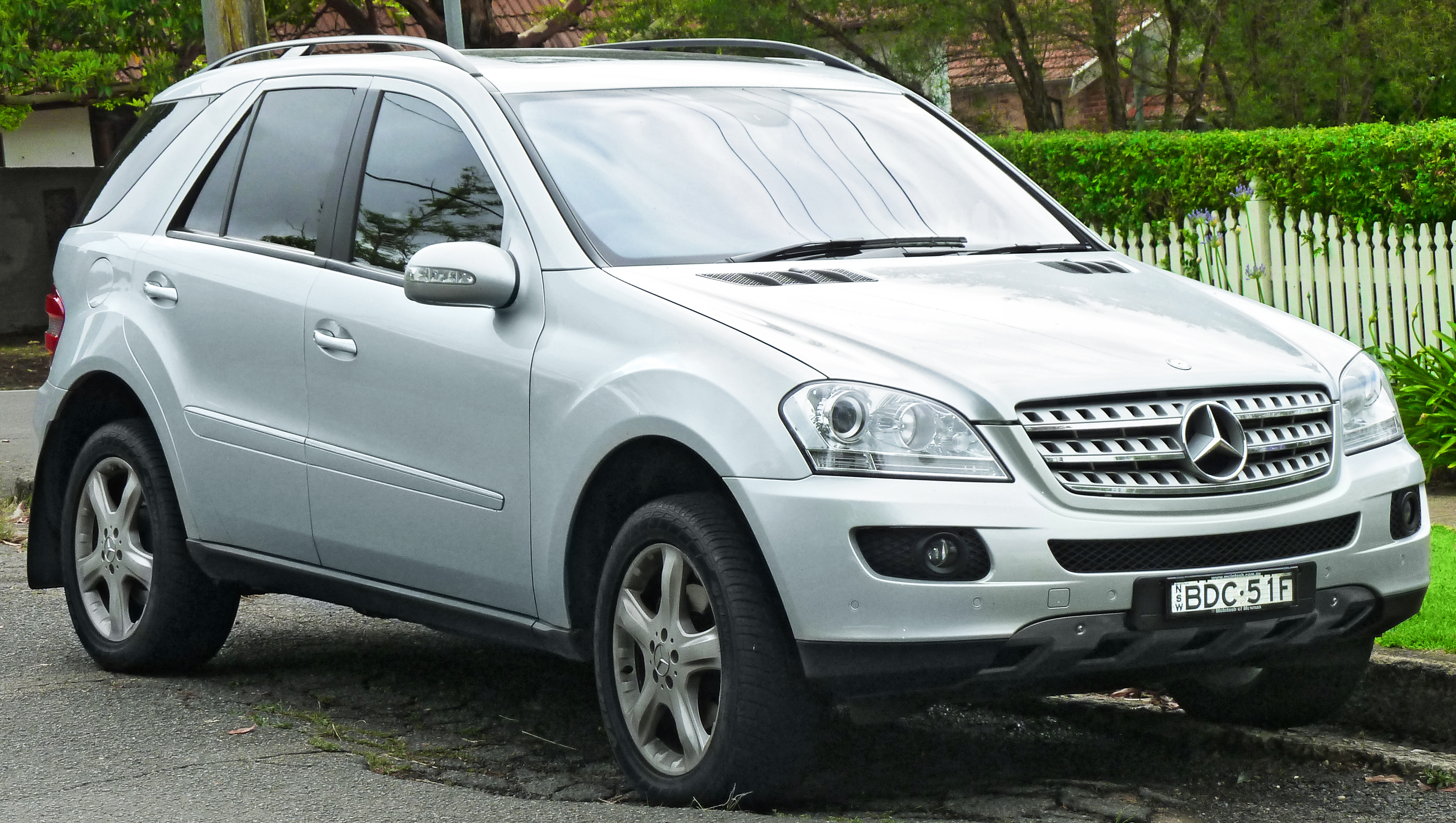
- 2006 ML 320 CDI (pre-facelift)

Overview
- Model code: W164
- Production: January 2005–2011
- Model years: 2006–2011
- Assembly: United States: Tuscaloosa, Alabama (MBUSI)
- Designer: Andreas Deufel, Holger Hutzenlaub, Steve Mattin (2001)

Body and chassis
- Body style: 5-door SUV
- Platform: W164/V251/W166
- Chassis: Unibody
- Related: Mercedes-Benz GL-Class (X164) Mercedes-Benz R-Class

Powertrain
- Engine: Gasoline: 3.5 L M272 E35 V6 (gasoline and hybrid); 5.0 L M113 E50 V8; 4.6 L M273 E47 V8; 5.5 L M273 E55 V8; 6.2 L M156 V8; Diesel: 3.0 L OM642 V6 turbo; 4.0 L OM629 V8 turbo (2005–2011)
- Electric motor: 2x AC synchronous electric motors (ML450 Hybrid): 62 kW (84 PS; 83 hp) 1st motor; 60 kW (82 PS; 80 hp) 2nd motor
- Transmission: 7-speed 7G-Tronic automatic two-mode hybrid CVT (ML450 Hybrid)
- Hybrid drivetrain: Two-mode hybrid drive Parallel Hybrid (ML450 Hybrid)
- Battery: 2.4 kWh Liquid-cooled high-voltage Ni-MH

Dimensions
- Wheelbase: 2,913 mm (114.7 in)
- Length: 4,781 mm (188.23 in); AMG: 4,821 mm (189.8 in); Hybrid: 4,806 mm (189.2 in)
- Width: 1,910 mm (75 in); AMG: 1,951 mm (76.8 in); Hybrid: 1,976 mm (77.8 in)
- Height: 1,815 mm (71.5 in); AMG: 1,862 mm (73.3 in)
- Curb weight: 2,150 kg (4,740 lb)

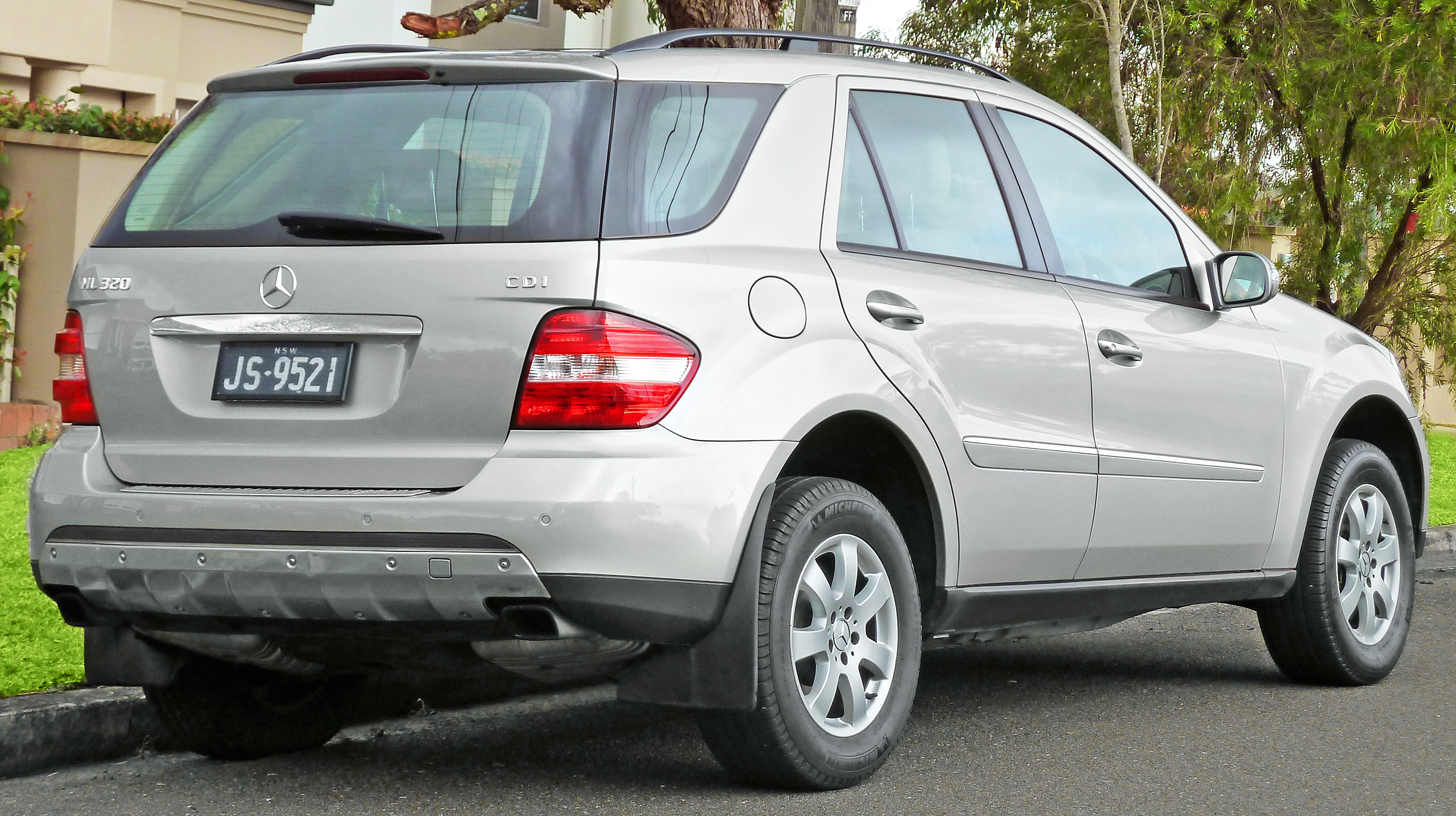
Pre-facelift Mercedes-Benz ML 320 CDI (Australia)

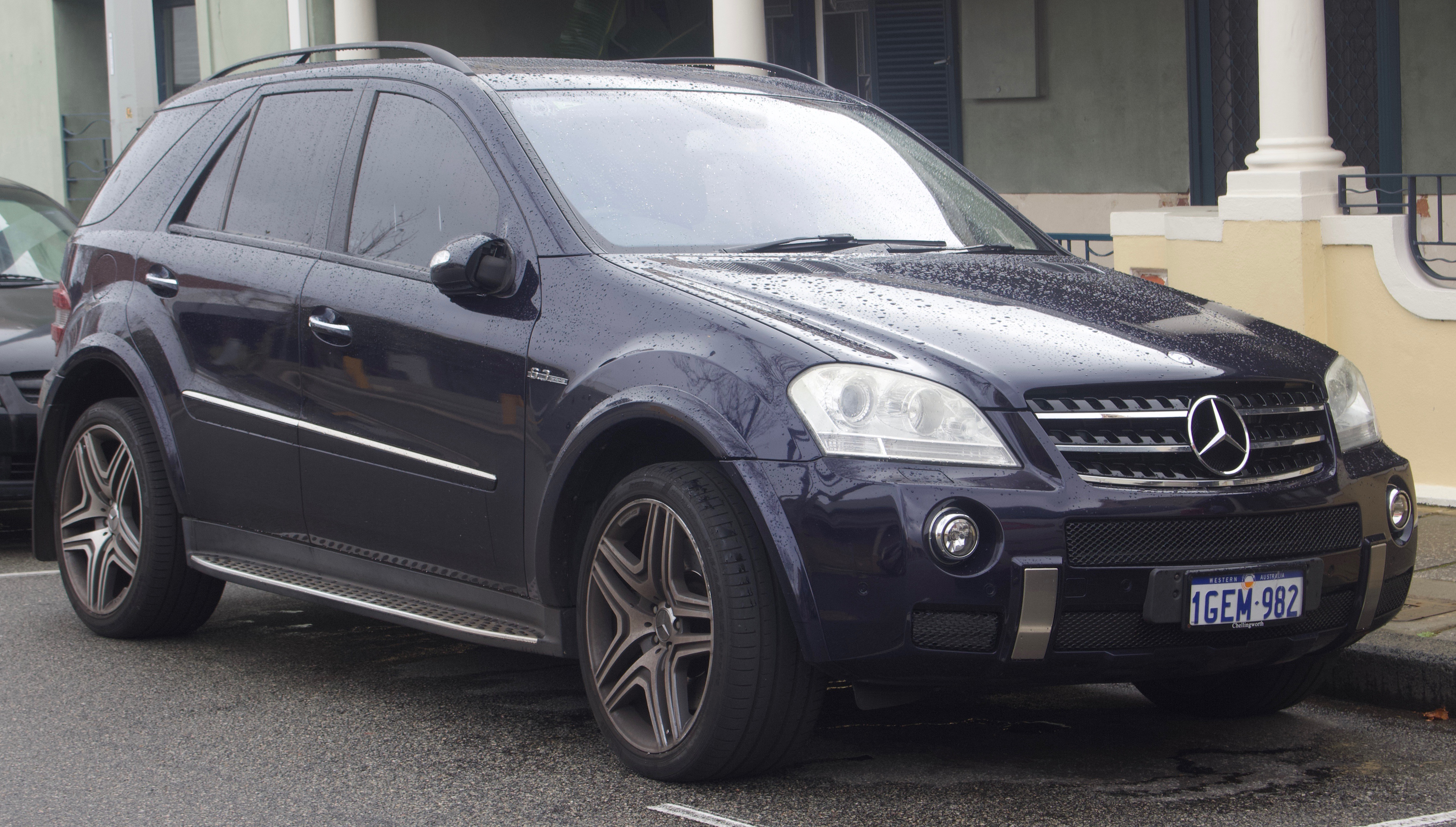

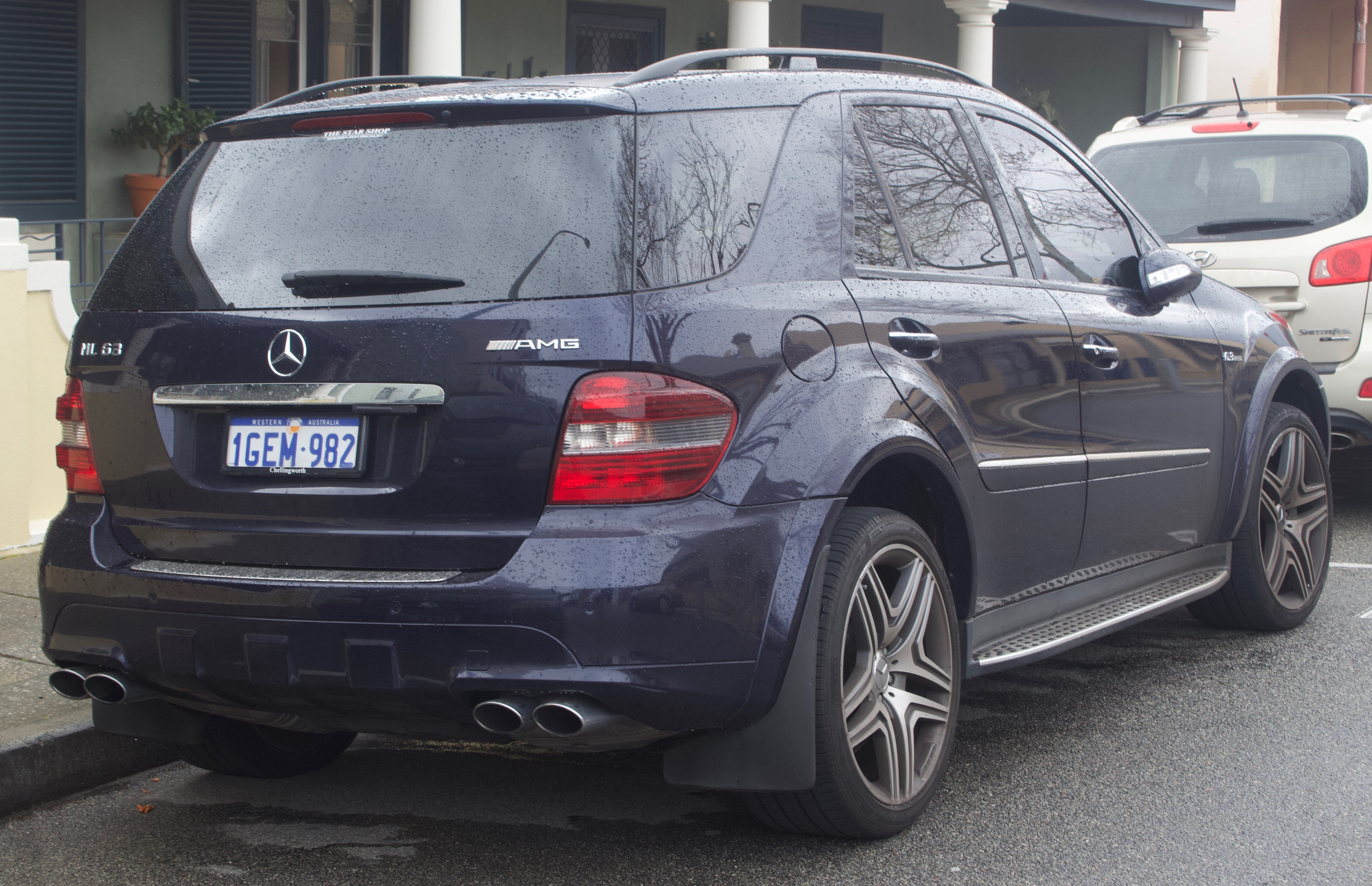
Mercedes-Benz ML 63 AMG (Australia; pre-facelift)

In 1999, development on a successor to the W163 began under the codename "W164" and spanned a period of six years. First design drafts appeared in 2000 with the first models in scale 1:4, and in 2001 three full-sized models were prepared. In 2002 the design styled by Steve Mattin under Peter Pfeiffer was chosen and approved by the executive board. Design patents were filed in Germany on 10 June 2003 and in the U.S. on 25 July. Prototype testing was conducted throughout 2003 and 2004, concluding in early 2005. The redesigned M-class (chassis name W164) was introduced in April 2005 as a 2006 model after a showing at the North American International Auto Show in January. It was almost entirely new, with a more sporting, aerodynamic look. The coefficient of drag was reduced to 0.34. Mercedes-Benz made the new M-Class 71 mm larger, 150 mm longer and 5 mm lower than the first model. The M-Class was named "Best New Sport Utility Vehicle" in the 2006 Canadian Car of the Year awards.

Mercedes-Benz extensively publicised the US$600 million spent to update its factory and add manufacturing space for the new R-Class. According to early automotive press reports, the 2006 M-Class vehicles demonstrated vast improvements in quality.

The W164 platform used for the new M-Class is shared with the new GL-Class and is a unibody type rather than the former (W163) body-on-frame used by the M-Class vehicles produced from 1998–2005. The X164 GL-Class, a longer seven-seater version of the W164 platform, is also available.

New features in the 2006 M-Class include the 7G-Tronic seven-speed automatic transmission, optional Active Curve-Illuminating Bi-Xenon headlights which "steer" in the path of the vehicle, and an adjustable-height air suspension. The manual transmission has been dropped. Permanent 4Matic four-wheel drive remained, with one-speed transfer case (no low range), center limited-slip differential and four-wheel electronic traction system (4-ETS). In most countries except the U.S., an Off-Road Pro package with center and rear differential locks, 4-ETS, two-speed transfer case with reduction gearing, and adjustable ground clearance was available as an option increasing the original fording depth from 500 mm to 600 mm.

The AMG version of the W164, the ML 63 AMG, was introduced at the 2006 North American International Auto Show as a limited edition 2007 model. It features a 6.2 L M156 V8 engine producing 510 PS (375 kW) and 465 lb⋅ft (630 N⋅m) that is handcrafted in Germany. The engine is added to an AMG SpeedShift 7G-Tronic seven-speed automatic transmission. The 2006 ML 63 AMG can accelerate from 0–60 mph (0–97 km/h) in 4.8 seconds, or from 0–62 mph (0–100 km/h) in 5.0 seconds. These features made the ML 63 AMG the most powerful naturally aspirated V8 SUV in the world at the time of its launch.

=== Facelift ===
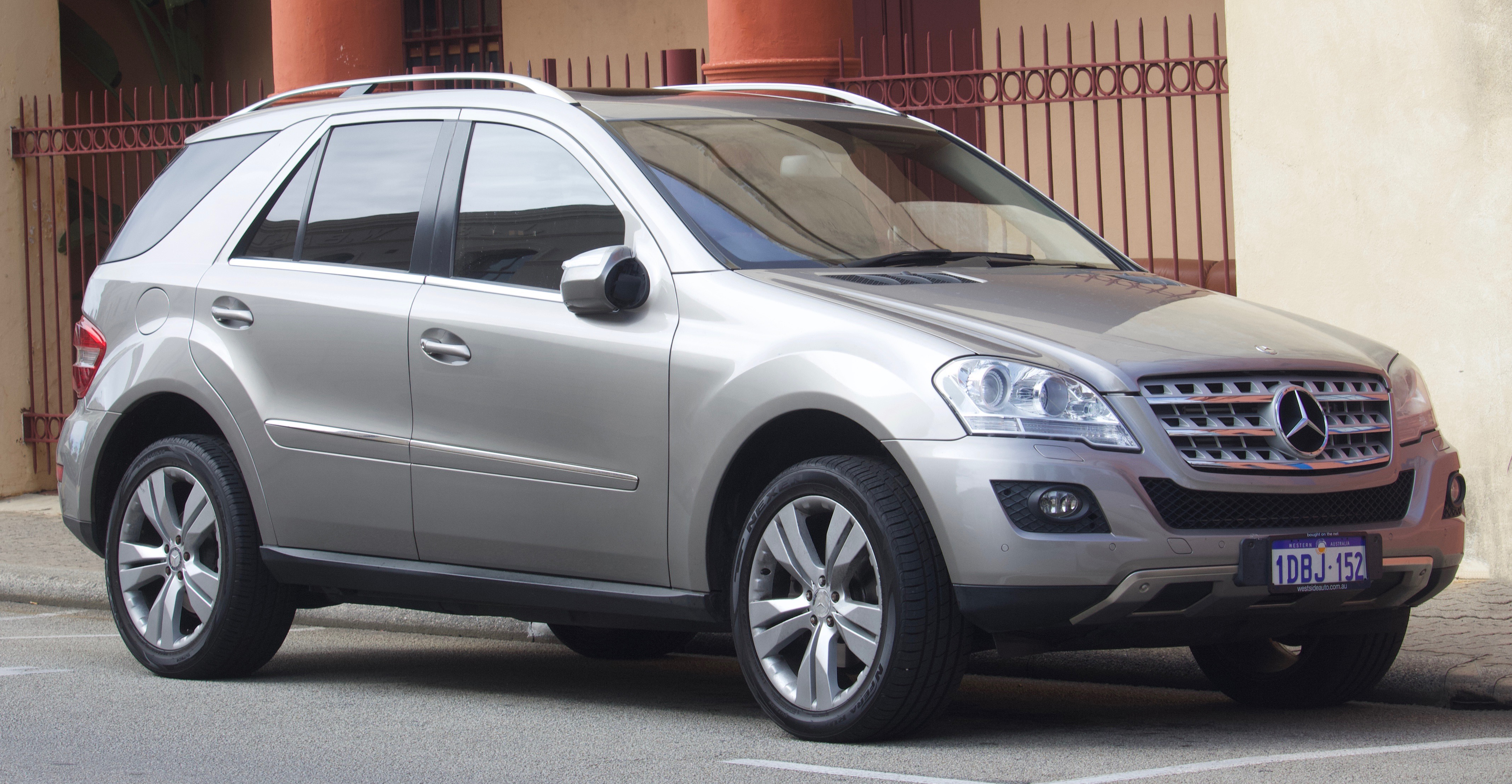

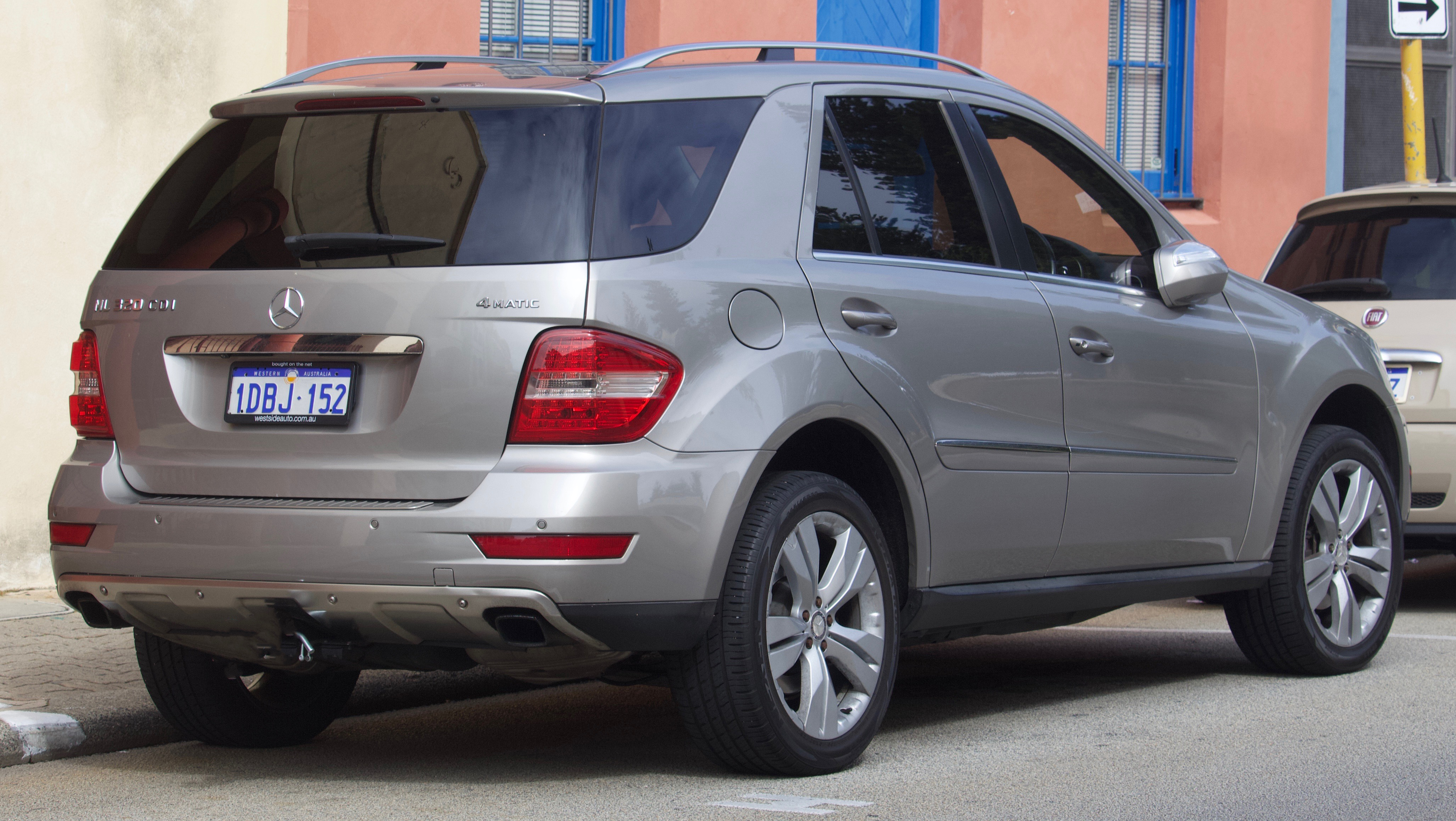
2008 facelift

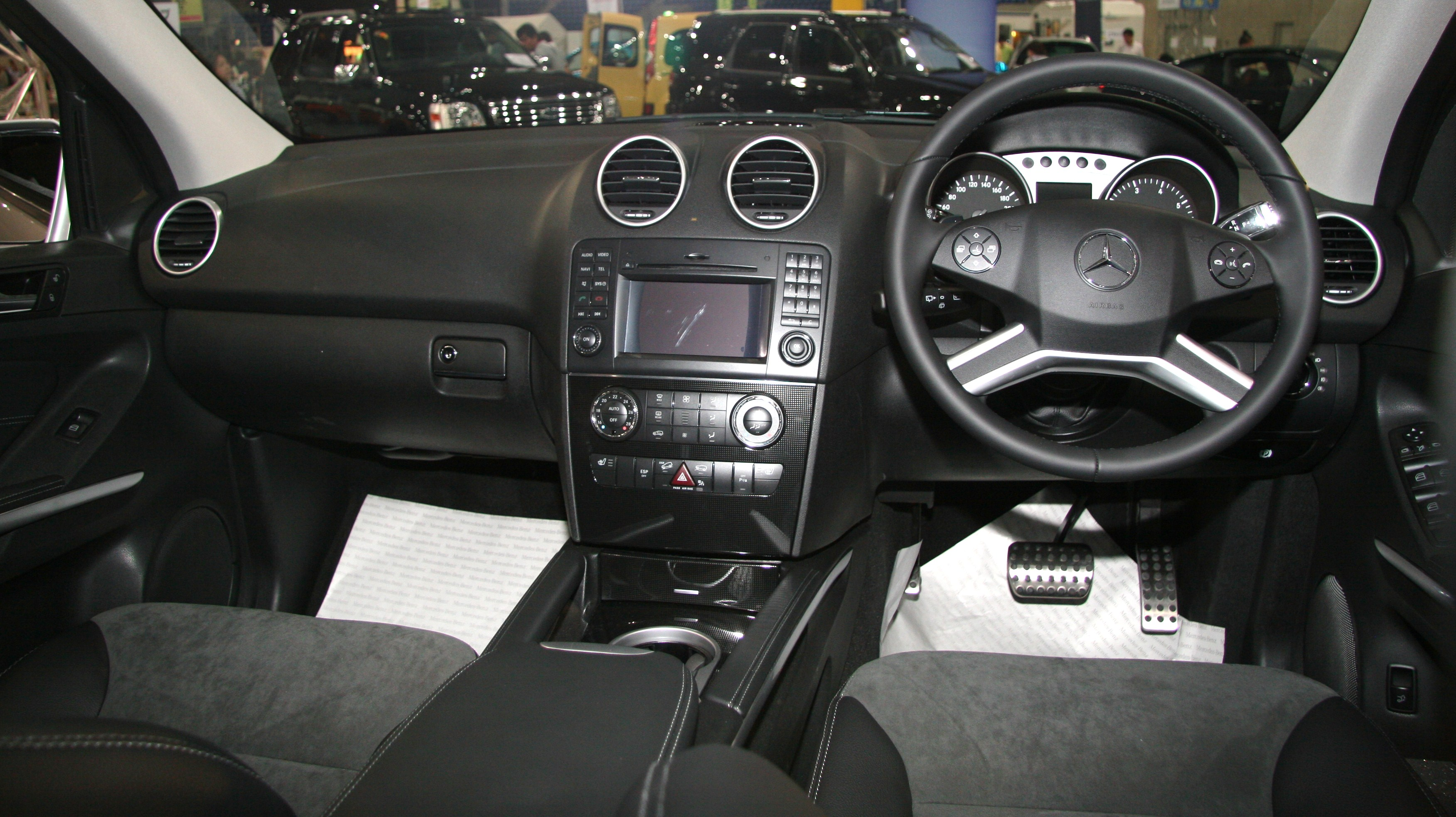
Interior

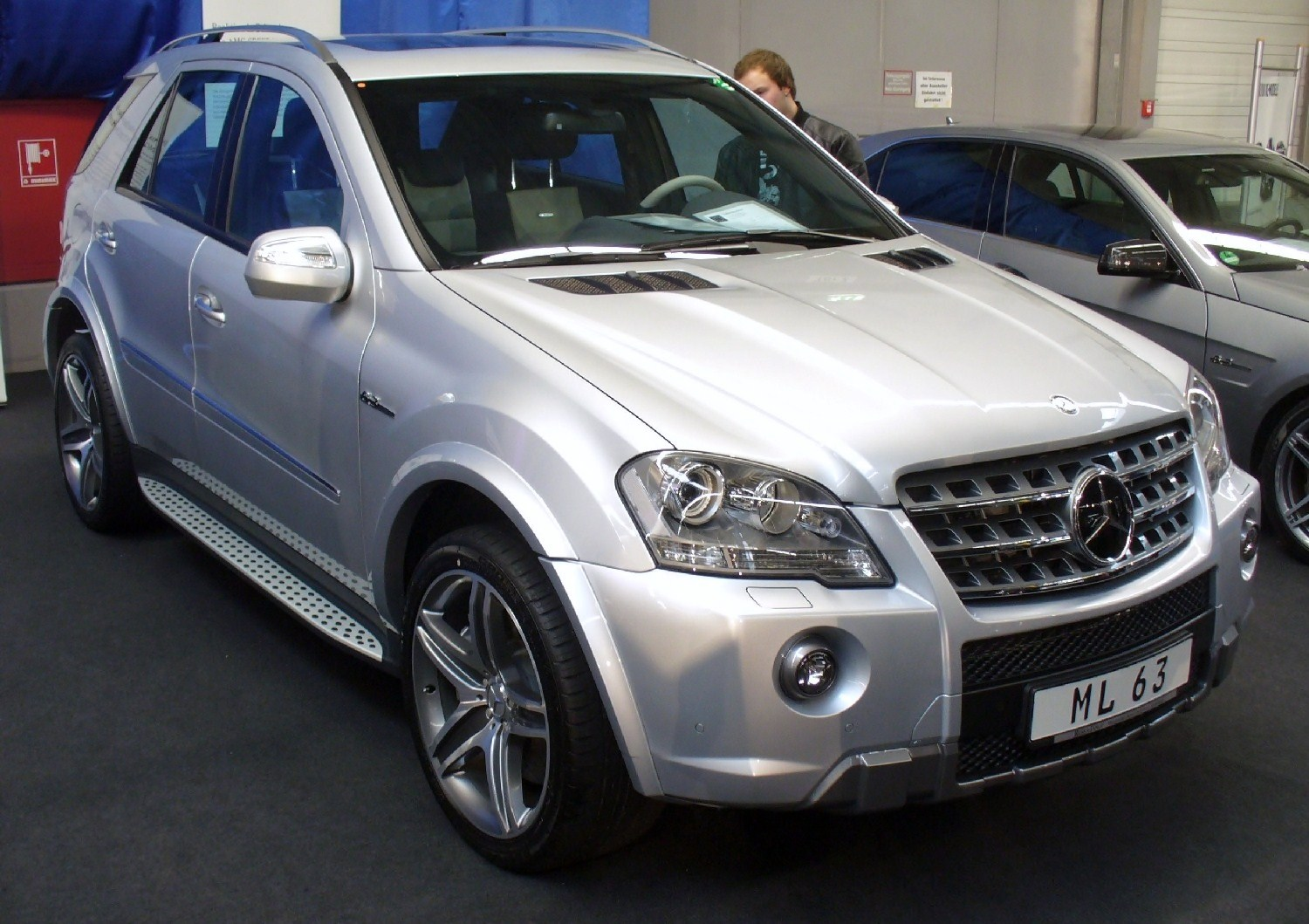

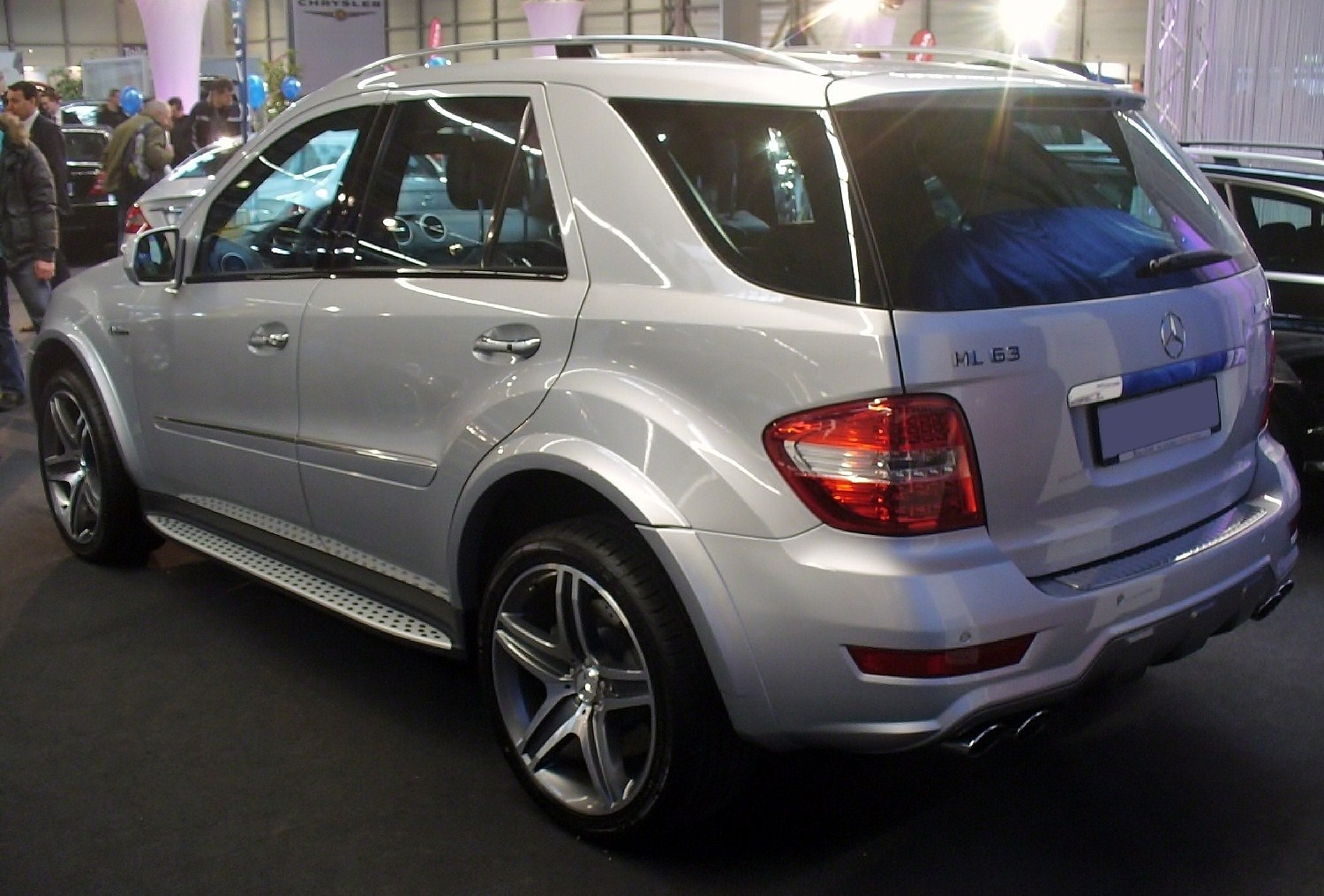
2008 facelift (ML 63 AMG)

By 2007, design work on updates to the W164 were finalized and patented domestically in Germany on 23 November 2007. The 2009 Mercedes-Benz M-Class got a minor facelift as it debuted at the 2008 New York International Auto Show in March 2008.

This facelift includes new front headlights, redesigned front and rear bumpers, new exterior mirrors, new rim choices, a larger front grille, restyled interior, and a new ML 420 CDI engine choice. The ML 280 CDI became the ML 300 CDI, the 320 CDI became the 350 CDI, and the 420 CDI became the 450 CDI.

Models using Bluetec Diesel engine with urea injection were introduced in 2008 for the 2009 model year.

At the 2009 New York International Auto Show, Mercedes-Benz showed their ML 450 Hybrid SUV, which was announced on 8 April 2009. The ML 450 Hybrid consumes almost 50% less fuel than the ML 550 does, even though it produces over 90% of the power generated by the V8 model. Total power generated will be 335 hp (250 kW) and 381 lb⋅ft (517 N⋅m) of torque, while getting 24 mpg_{‑US} (9.8 L/100 km) on the highway and 21 mpg_{‑US} (11 L/100 km) in the city, according to United States Environmental Protection Agency (EPA) estimates. The engine itself runs on the Atkinson cycle and by itself makes 275 hp. The ML 450 was developed under the Global Hybrid Cooperation, and will only be available in the United States under lease.

In 2011, Mercedes-Benz came out with the M-Class BlueTec Grand Edition. The vehicle had cosmetic changes, including specially-manufactured 22-inch 10 spoke wheels, black leather with white stitching, and smokers package with Grand Edition modeling. The exterior consisted of new wheels, tinted headlights and tail lights, xenon-package (LED tail lights and daytime running lights, Xenon headlights), black grille, AMG, and side-view mirrors. The Grand Edition was offered in Midnight Blue, Black, and Ivory White, differentiating the basic model by color already. The interior featured an AMG steering wheel in place of the standard heated steering wheel.

=== Engines (2005–2011) ===
Model	Years	Configuration	Displacement	Power	Torque	0–100 km/h (0–62 mph)	Top speed
Gasoline engines
ML 350 4MATIC	2005–2011	3498 cc	V6 NA	203 kW (276 PS; 272 hp)	350 N⋅m (258 lbf⋅ft)	8.4 seconds	215 km/h (134 mph)
ML 450 Hybrid 4MATIC	2009–2011	3498 cc	V6 NA + 2x Electric Motors	254 kW (345 PS; 341 hp)	517 N⋅m (381 lbf⋅ft)	7.8 seconds	211 km/h (131 mph)
ML 500 4MATIC (2005)	2005–2007	4966 cc	V8 NA	228 kW (310 PS; 306 hp)	406 N⋅m (299 lbf⋅ft)	6.9 seconds	235 km/h (146 mph)
ML 500 4MATIC (2008); ML 550 4MATIC (2008)	2007–2011	5461 cc	V8 NA	290 kW (394 PS; 389 hp)	530 N⋅m (391 lbf⋅ft)	5.5 seconds	250 km/h (155 mph)
ML 63 AMG 4MATIC	2006–2011	6208 cc	V8 NA	380 kW (517 PS; 510 hp)	630 N⋅m (465 lbf⋅ft)	5 seconds	250 km/h (155 mph)
Diesel engines
ML 280 CDI 4MATIC / ML 300 CDI 4MATIC BLUEEFFICIENCY	2005–2010	2987 cc	V6 Turbo	141 kW (192 PS; 189 hp)	440 N⋅m (325 lbf⋅ft)	10.4 seconds	205 km/h (127 mph)
ML 300 CDI 4MATIC	2010–2011	2987 cc	V6 Turbo	152 kW (207 PS; 204 hp)	500 N⋅m (369 lbf⋅ft)	8.2 seconds	210 km/h (130 mph)
ML 320 CDI 4MATIC	2005–2009	2987 cc	V6 Turbo	157 kW (213 PS; 211 hp)	540 N⋅m (398 lbf⋅ft)	9.4 seconds	210 km/h (130 mph)
ML 350 CDI BlueTec 4MATIC	2009–2011	2987 cc	V6 Turbo	167 kW (227 PS; 224 hp)	510 N⋅m (376 lbf⋅ft)	8.7 seconds	210 km/h (130 mph)
ML 420 CDI 4MATIC	2005–2009	3996 cc	V8 Turbo (OM629)	228 kW (310 PS; 306 hp)	700 N⋅m (516 lbf⋅ft)	6.8 seconds	225 km/h (140 mph)
ML 450 CDI 4MATIC	2009–2010	3996 cc	V8 Turbo (OM629)	228 kW (310 PS; 306 hp)	700 N⋅m (516 lbf⋅ft)	6.5 seconds	235 km/h (146 mph)

=== Safety ===
==== Euro NCAP ====
Euro NCAP test results* Mercedes-Benz ML320 CDI (2008)
Test	Score	Rating
Adult occupant:	34	5 /5 stars
Child occupant:	34	3 /5 stars
Pedestrian:	6	1 /4 stars

==== IIHS ====
IIHS scores (2006 model year)
Moderate overlap front (original test)	Good
Side impact (original test)	Good
Head restraints and seats	Marginal

==== ANCAP ====
ANCAP test results* Mercedes-Benz M-Class (2008)
Test	Score
Overall	5 /5 stars
Frontal offset	13.97/16
Side impact	16/16
Pole	2/2
Seat belt reminders	2/3
Whiplash protection	Not Assessed
Pedestrian protection	Poor
Electronic stability control	Standard

== Third generation (W166/C292; 2011) ==
Mercedes-Benz M-Class/GLE (W166/C292)
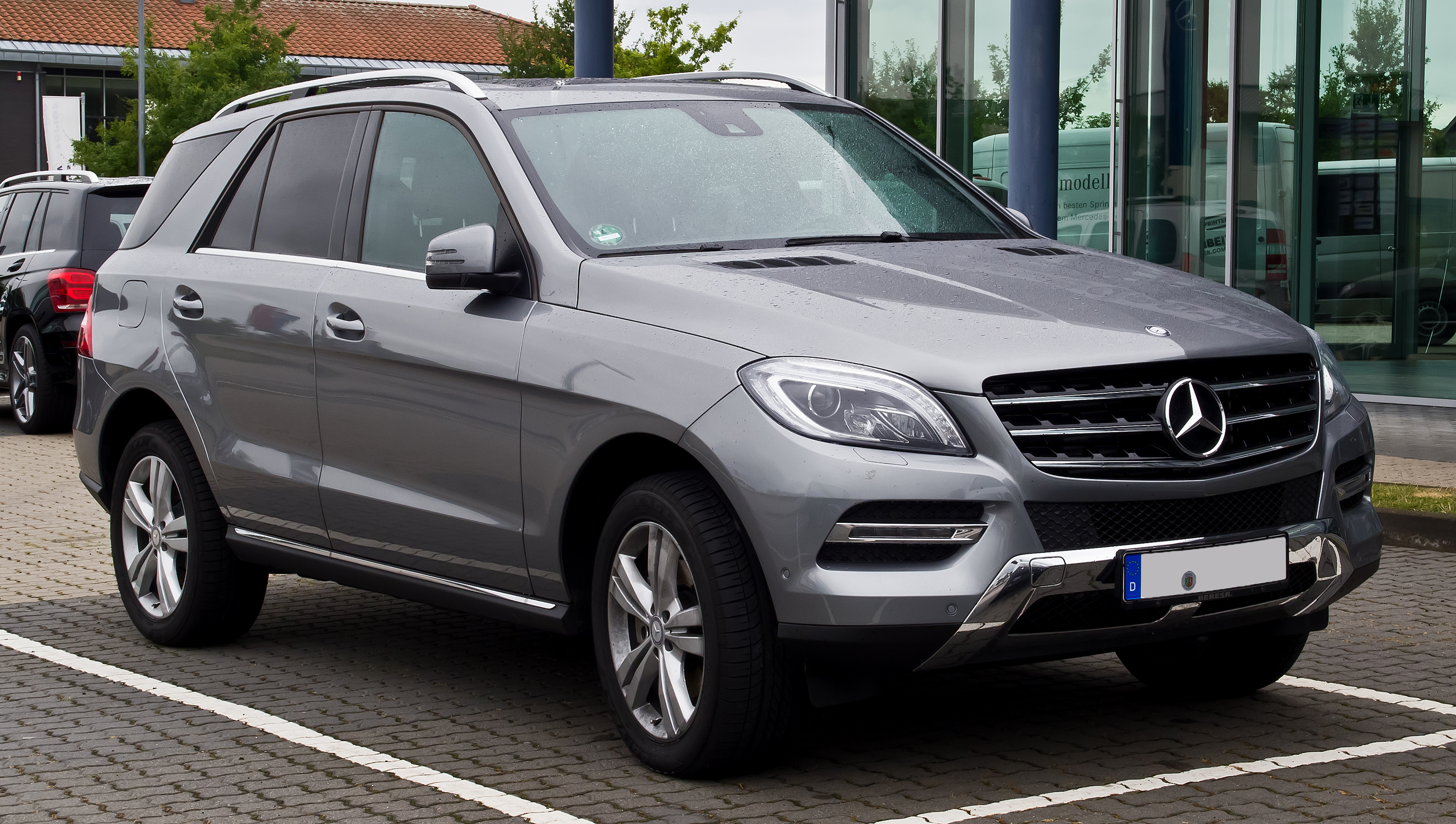
- 2013 ML350 W166 wagon (pre-facelift)

Overview
- Model code: W166; C292 (Coupé)
- Production: July 2011–2019
- Model years: 2012–2019
- Assembly: United States: Tuscaloosa, Alabama (MBUSI); India: Pune, Maharashtra (MBI); Indonesia: Bogor (MBDI); Thailand: Samut Prakan (TAAP)
- Designer: Emiel Burki (2008)

Body and chassis
- Body style: 5-door SUV; 5-door coupe SUV
- Platform: W164/V251/W166
- Chassis: Unibody
- Related: Mercedes-Benz GL-Class (X166) Dodge Durango (WD) Jeep Grand Cherokee (WK2)

Powertrain
- Engine: Gasoline: 3.5 L M 276 DE 35 V6; 3.0 L M276 DE 30 red. bi-turbo V6; 4.7 L M278 DE 46 AL bi-turbo V8; 5.5 L M157 DE 55 AL bi-turbo V8; Gasoline PHEV: 3.0 L M 276 DE 30 AL bi-turbo V6; Diesel: 2.1 L OM 651 DE 22 LA turbo I4; 3.0 L OM642 LS DE 30LA turbo V6
- Transmission: 7-speed 7G-Tronic automatic 9-speed 9G-Tronic automatic
- Hybrid drivetrain: Plug-in hybrid (GLE 500 e)

Dimensions
- Wheelbase: 2,916 mm (114.8 in)
- Length: 4,803 mm (189.1 in); AMG: 4,820 mm (189.8 in); Hybrid: 4,780 mm (188.2 in)
- Width: 1,926 mm (75.8 in); AMG: 1,950 mm (76.8 in); Hybrid: 1,980 mm (77.8 in)
- Height: 1,796 mm (70.7 in); AMG: 1,860 mm (73.3 in)
- Curb weight: 2,150 kg (4,740 lb)

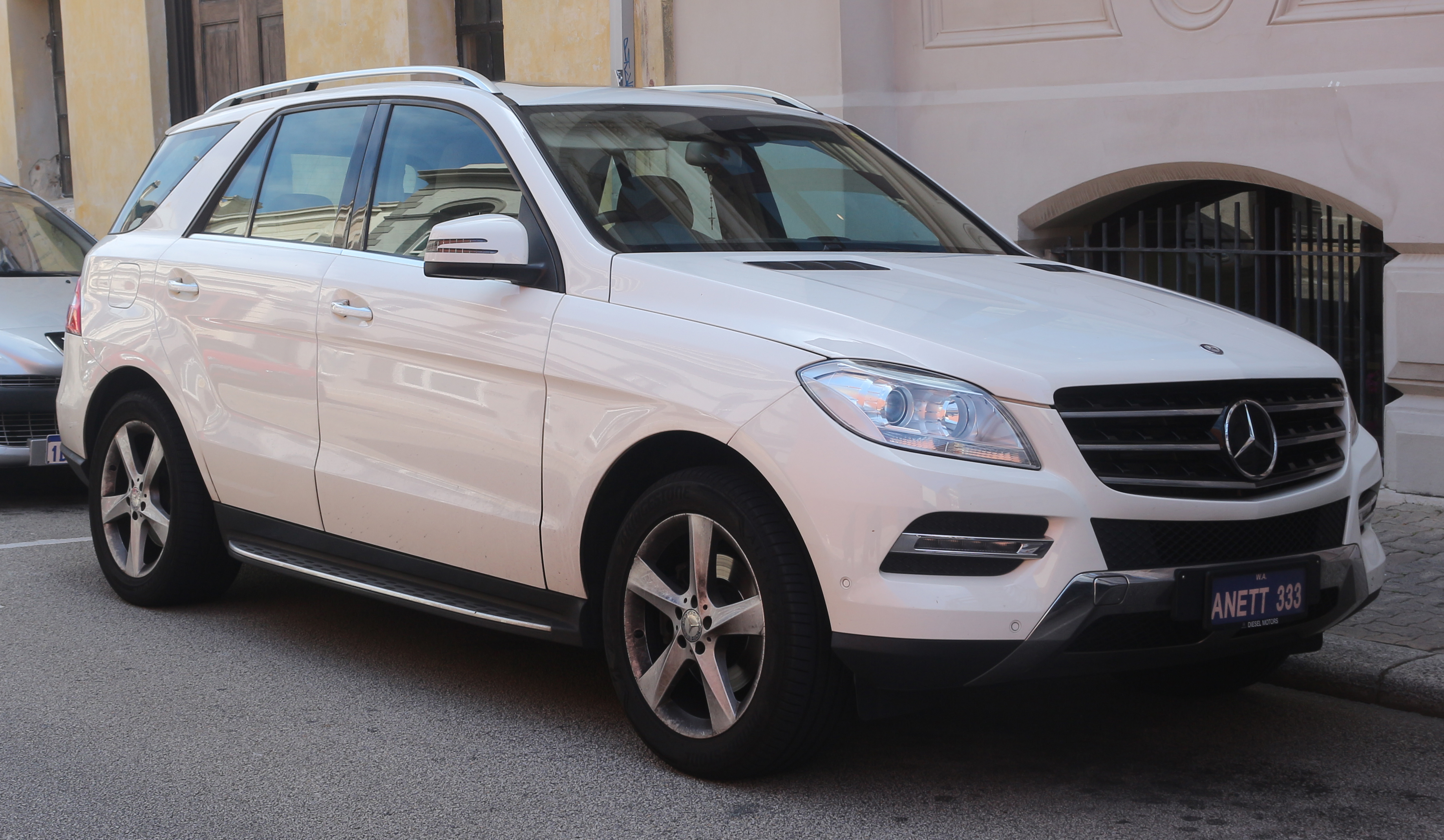

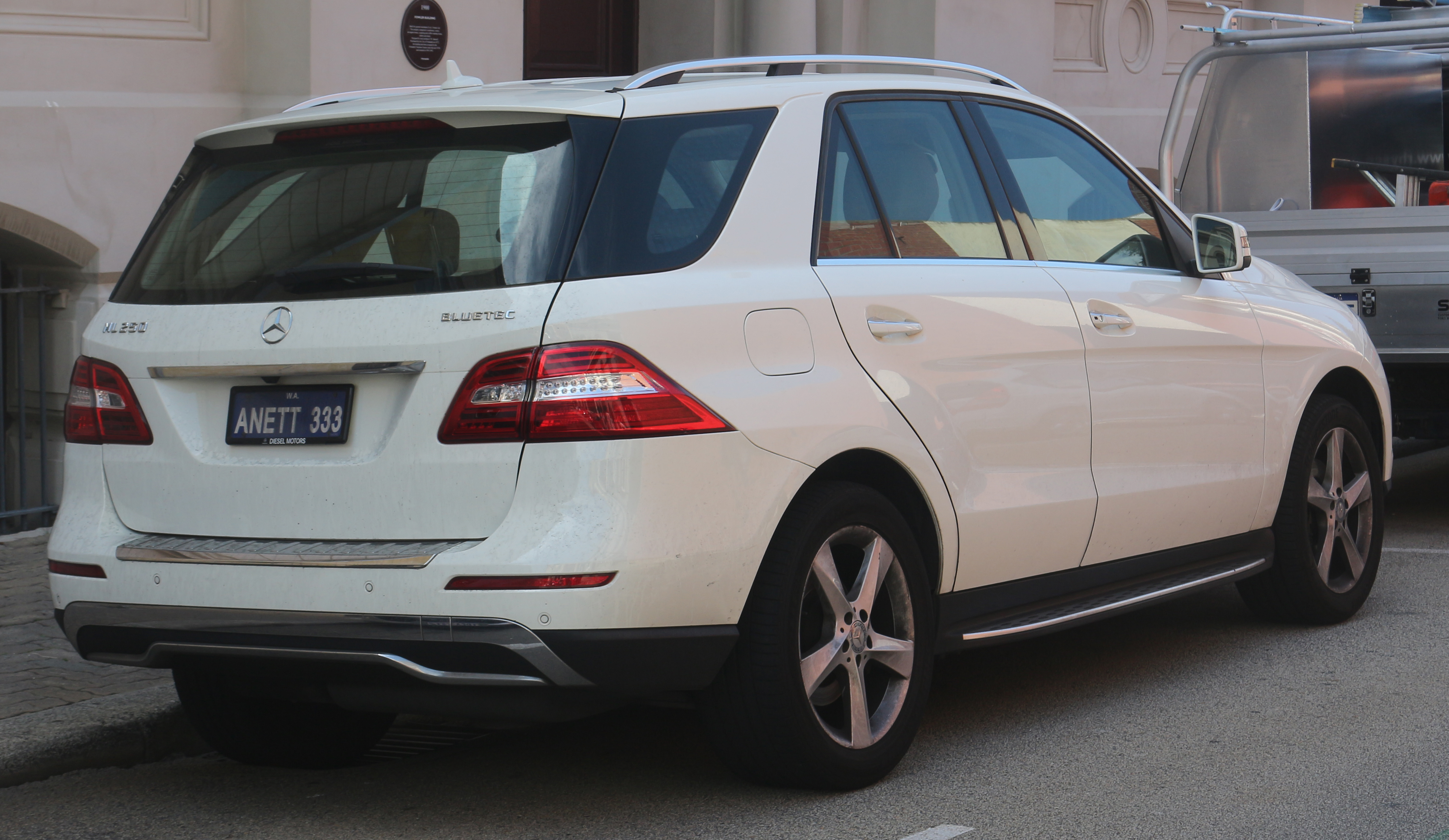
Mercedes-Benz ML 250 BlueTEC (Australia)

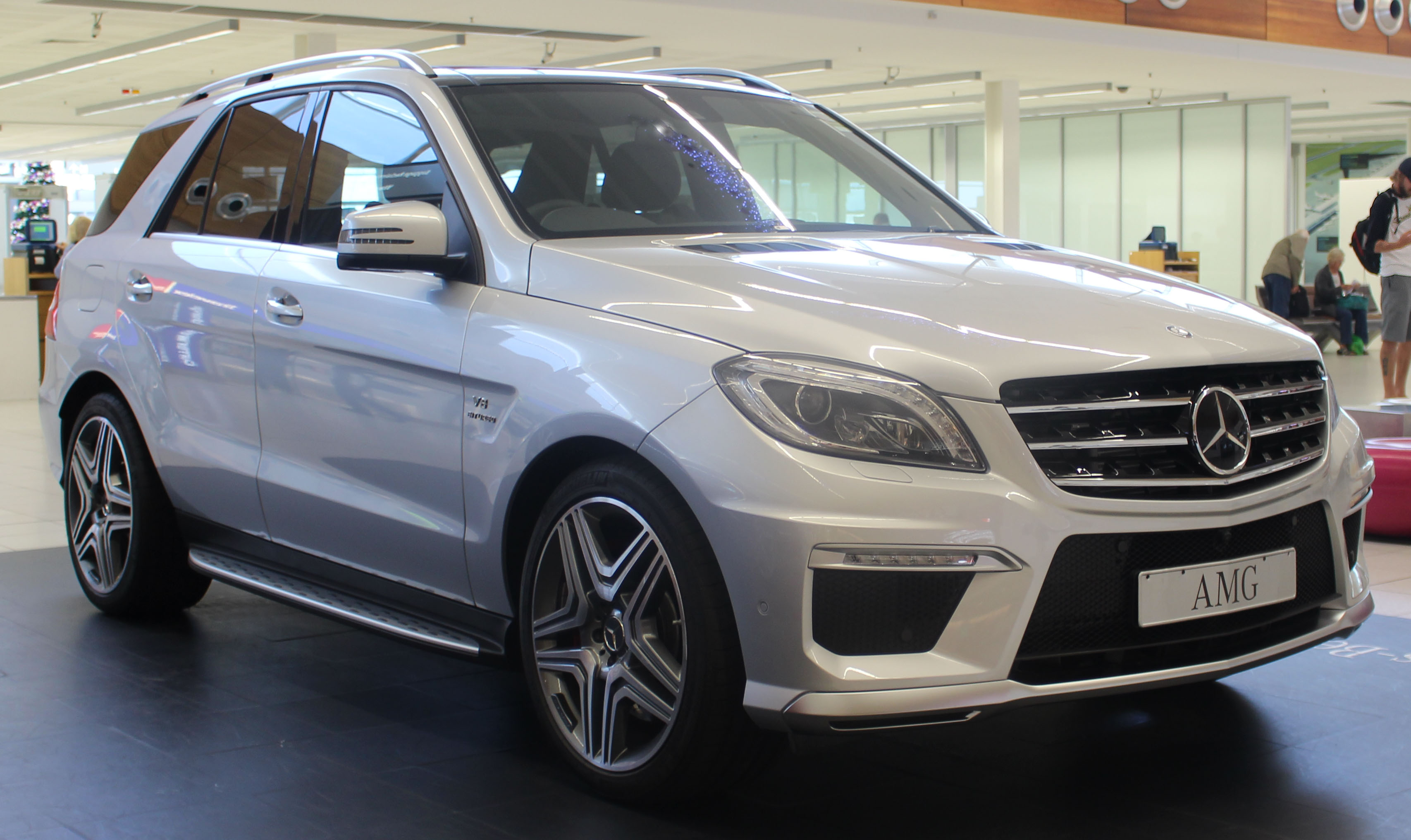

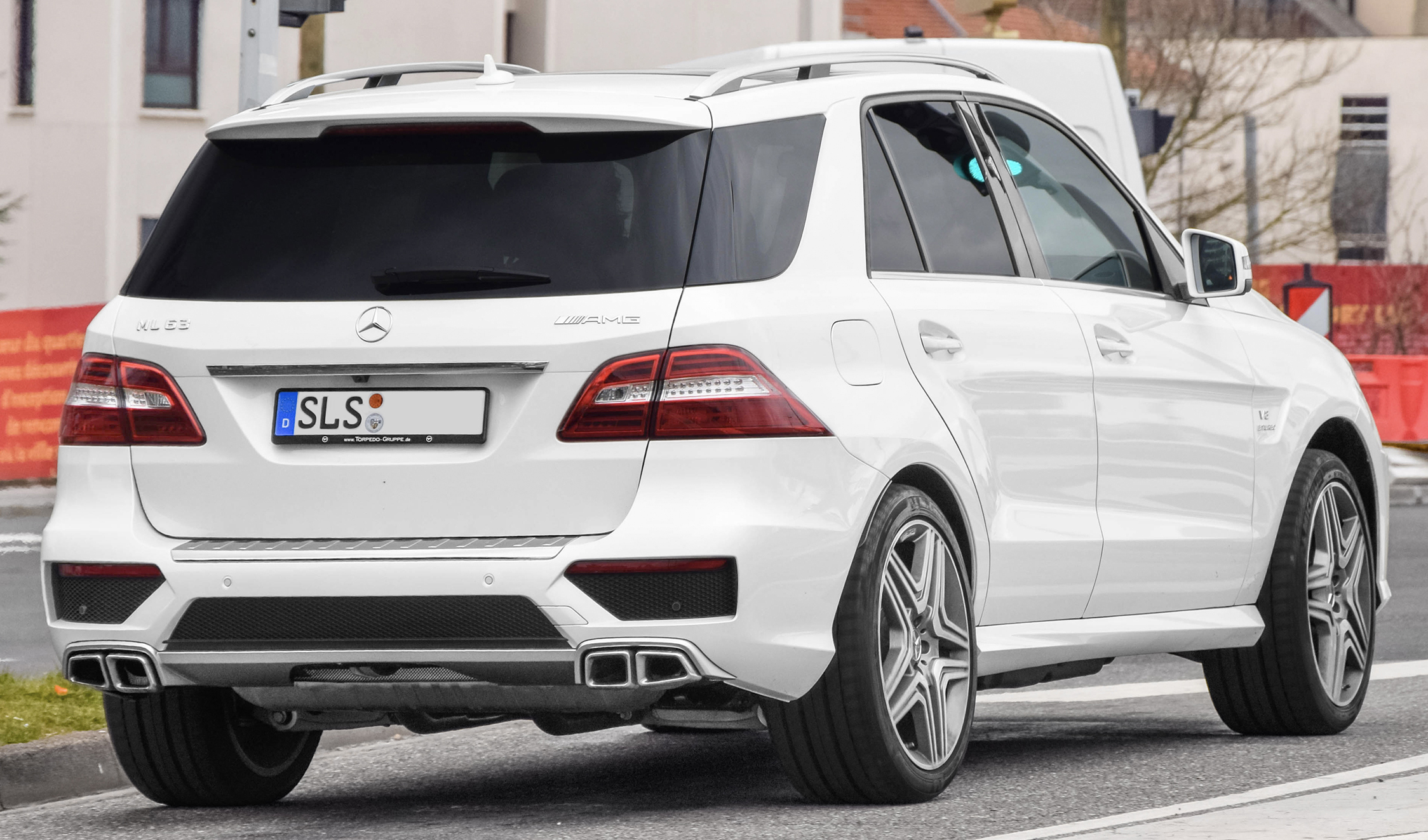
Mercedes-Benz ML 63 AMG

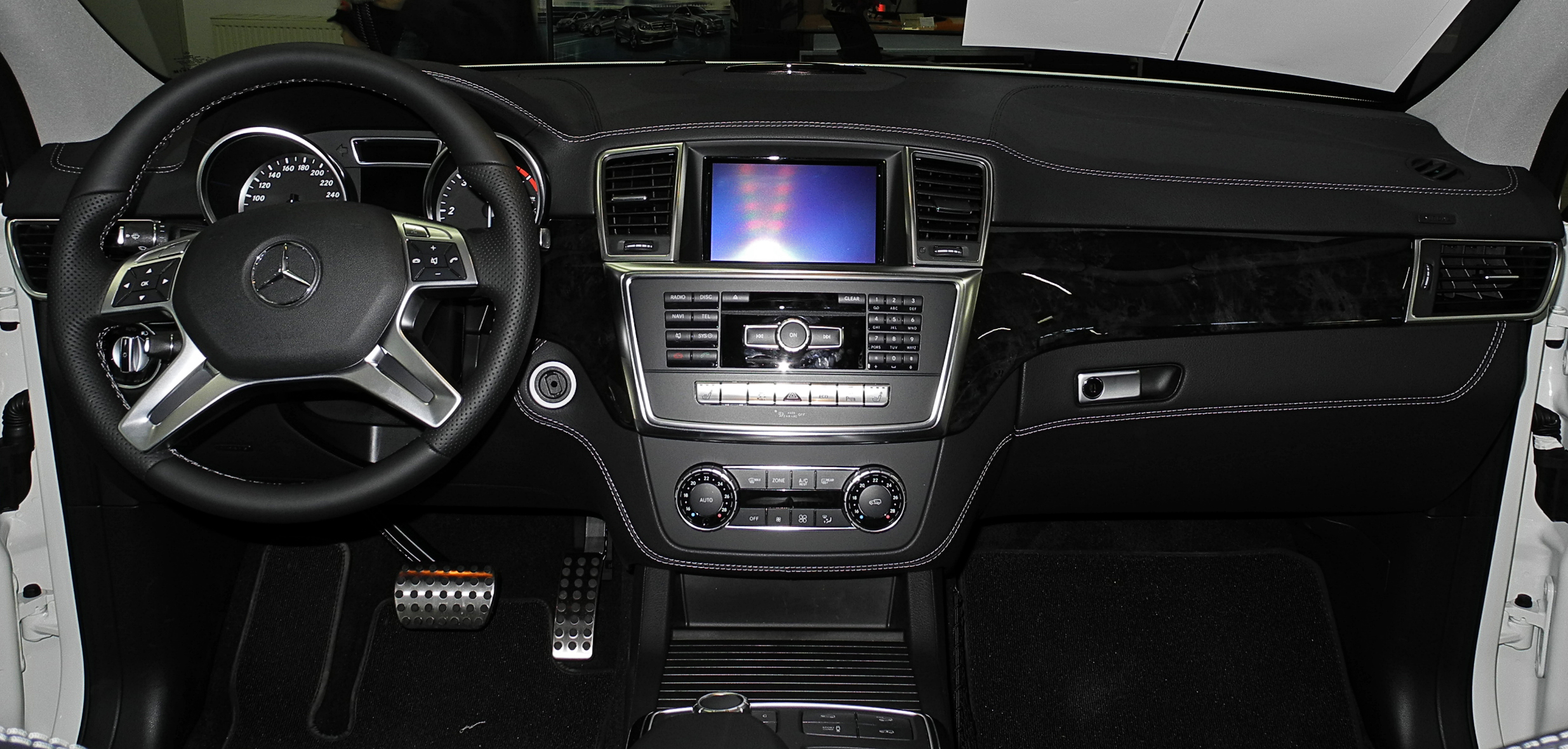
Interior

In 2006, development began on the next-generation M-Class and spanned over a period of 5 years, a shorter duration than its predecessor. In 2008, the final design by Emiel Burki was approved and patented domestically on 16 December 2008 (U.S. design patent filed on 15 June 2009). The newly redesigned M-Class (chassis name W166) was introduced in pre-production form 10 June 2011 as a 2012 model. The first customer-designated W166 rolled off the Vance production line on 20 July. It is moderately refined, taking styling cues from the new generation Mercedes-Benz E-Class. An increase in rear seat legroom has been implemented, alongside adjustable rear backrests. It was to be launched in September 2011.

New features in the 2012 M-Class include an updated 7G-Tronic Plus seven-speed automatic transmission to provide improved fuel economy, optional adaptive cruise control (Distronic Plus), active lane departure warning system, and an adjustable-height air suspension (AirMatic). An active curve system with active anti-roll bars for body roll compensation was introduced.

The W166 was one of the last vestiges of the joint venture between Daimler and Chrysler while they were a consolidated company. DaimlerChrysler developed the core platform and technology, benefitting from Chrysler's strong SUV sales and R&D domestically. The underlying platform work was largely completed in 2006, as the two companies were separated. Chrysler uses the same platform to power the Jeep Grand Cherokee (WK2) and Dodge Durango. Because of the separation however, the cars are extremely different in terms of interior and body design as well as engine choices. Aside from engines, the three SUVs share many powertrain components, including some transmissions.

An On&Off Road Package is available for most markets (including North America) as of the 2013 model year. The package adds a two-speed dual range Magna Powertrain transfer case with center differential lock, reduction gearing, underbody skid plates, and a 6-mode selectable terrain driving program system. The rear differential lock has been discontinued.

Open front and rear differentials are fitted, and use four-wheel electronic traction system (4-ETS) to simulate front and rear differential locks.

The Mercedes M-Class won first place in the "Luxury Crossover SUV" category and has been named the most ideal vehicle for Americans based on a study undertaken by California-based automotive research and consulting firm AutoPacific.

Mercedes-Benz India established a manufacturing plant in Chakan, Pune in early 2009 that rolled out the first W166 M-Class to be built outside the US in October 2012. In the following month, Mercedes-Benz Indonesia began M-Class assembly at a factory in Wanaherang, West Java. These plants perform final assembly of vehicles shipped as "knocked-down" kits from Vance, USA.

In the second half of 2015 a facelifted W166 was released as the GLE, along with a coupé version.

The previous Popemobile was based on the 2012 M-Class and was delivered in December 2012.

=== Engines (2012–2019) ===
Gasoline engines
Model	Years	Type	Power, torque@rpm
GLE 320 4MATIC (China)	2016–2019	2,996 cc (3.0 L) V6 BiTurbo (Mercedes-Benz M276 DELA 30 engine)	276 PS (272 hp; 203 kW) @5000, 400 N⋅m (295 lb⋅ft) @1300–4500
ML 350 / GLE 350	2012–2018	3,498 cc (3.5 L) V6 NA (Mercedes-Benz M276 DE 35 engine)	306 PS (302 hp; 225 kW) @6500, 370 N⋅m (273 lb⋅ft) @3500–5250
ML 400 / GLE 400 4MATIC	2015–2019	2,996 cc (3.0 L) V6 BiTurbo (Mercedes-Benz M276 DELA 30 engine)	333 PS (328 hp; 245 kW) @5250–6000, 480 N⋅m (354 lb⋅ft) @1600–4000
GLE 450 AMG 4MATIC/AMG GLE 43 4MATIC	2015–2018	2,996 cc (3.0 L) V6 BiTurbo (Mercedes-Benz M276 DELA 30 engine)	367 PS (362 hp; 270 kW) @5500–6000, 520 N⋅m (384 lb⋅ft) @2000–4000
ML 500/ ML550 4MATIC	2012–2015	4,663 cc (4.7 L) V8 BiTurbo	408 PS (402 hp; 300 kW) @5000–5750, 600 N⋅m (443 lb⋅ft) @1600–4750
GLE 500/ GLE550 4MATIC	2015–2018	4,663 cc (4.7 L) V8 BiTurbo	429 PS (423 hp; 316 kW) @5250, 700 N⋅m (516 lb⋅ft) @1800–4000
ML 63 / GLE 63 AMG (with 4MATIC)	2012–2015	5,461 cc (5.5 L) V8 Biturbo (Mercedes-Benz M157 engine)	525 PS (518 hp; 386 kW) @5250, 700 N⋅m (516 lb⋅ft) @1750–5000; Performance Package: 557 PS (549 hp; 410 kW) @5750, 760 N⋅m (561 lb⋅ft) @2000–5000
GLE 63 S AMG 4MATIC	2015–2019	5,461 cc (5.5 L) V8 Biturbo (Mercedes-Benz M157 engine)	585 PS (577 hp; 430 kW) @5500, 760 N⋅m (561 lb⋅ft) @1750–5350

Diesel engines
Model	Years	Type	Power, torque@rpm
ML 250 CDI/BlueTEC 4MATIC / GLE 250d 4MATIC	2012–2019	2,143 cc (2.1 L) 16V I4 Bi-turbo Mercedes-Benz OM651 DE 22 LA engine	204 PS (201 hp; 150 kW) @4200, 500 N⋅m (369 lb⋅ft) @1600–1800
ML 350 BlueTEC 4MATIC / GLE 350d 4MATIC	2012–2019	2,987 cc (3.0 L) 24V V6 Single turbo Mercedes-Benz OM 642 LS DE 30 LA engine)	258 PS (254 hp; 190 kW) @3800, 620 N⋅m (457 lb⋅ft) @1600–2400

Plug-in Hybrid engines
Model	Years	Type	Power, torque@rpm
GLE 500e	2016–2019	2,996 cc (3.0 L) 24V V6 Bi-turbo (Mercedes-Benz M276 DELA 30 engine)	245 kW (333 PS; 329 bhp) at 5,250–6,000 (Engine) / 85 kW (116 PS; 114 bhp) (Electric), 480 N⋅m (354 lb⋅ft) at 1,600–4,000 (Engine) / 340 N⋅m (251 lb⋅ft) (Electric)

=== Facelift (GLE) ===
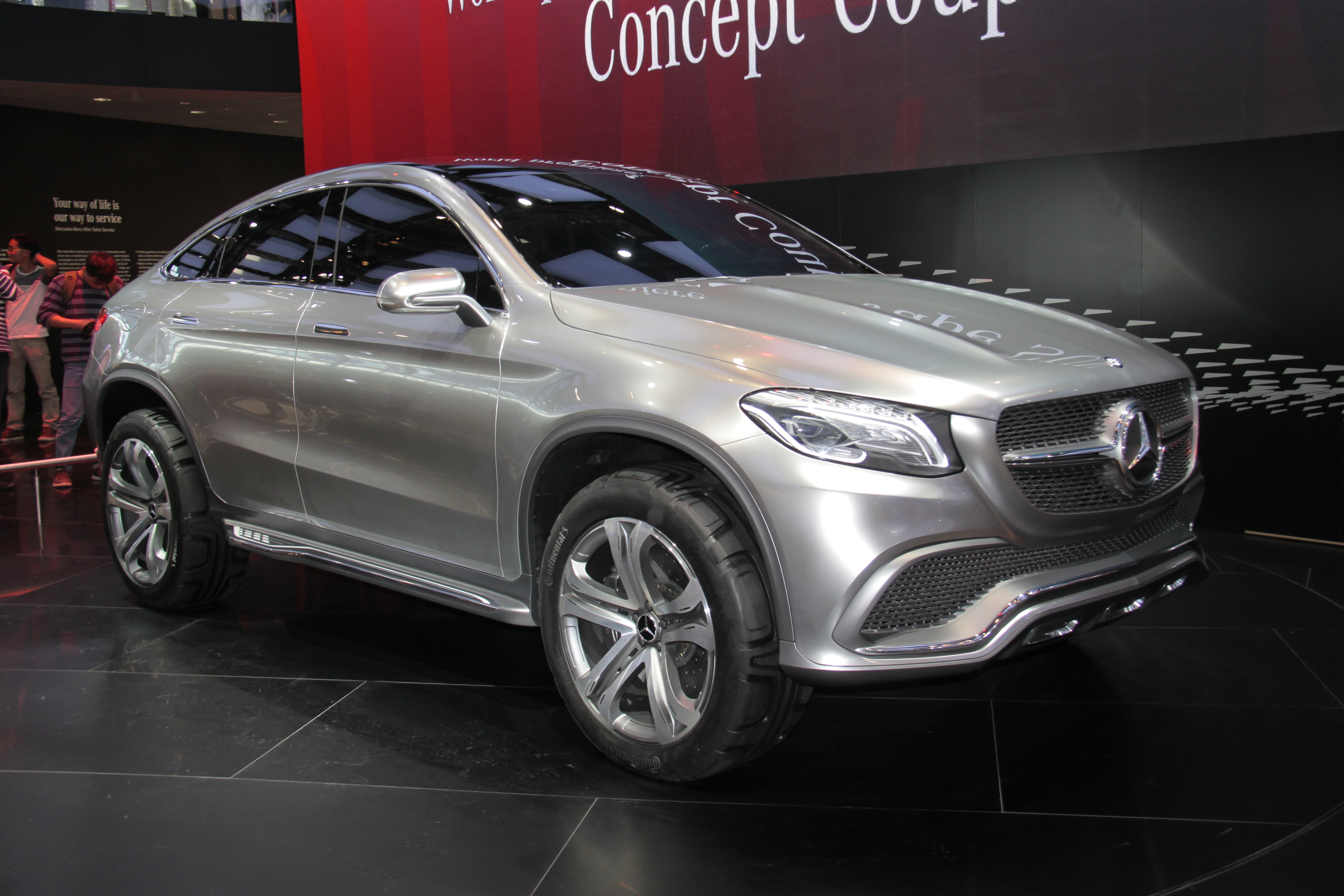
Mercedes-Benz Concept Coupé SUV

The GLE name was used in 2015 for the facelifted W166 along with the new five-door coupé derivative GLE Coupé (C292) which was unveiled to the public in January 2015 at the North American International Auto Show. As part of Mercedes-Benz's new naming strategy, the GLE will define the SUV's positioning in the middle of its segment and between the future GLC and GLS (the former GLK and GL, respectively), the same way the E-Class is positioned in relation to the C and S-Classes.

==== Body variants ====
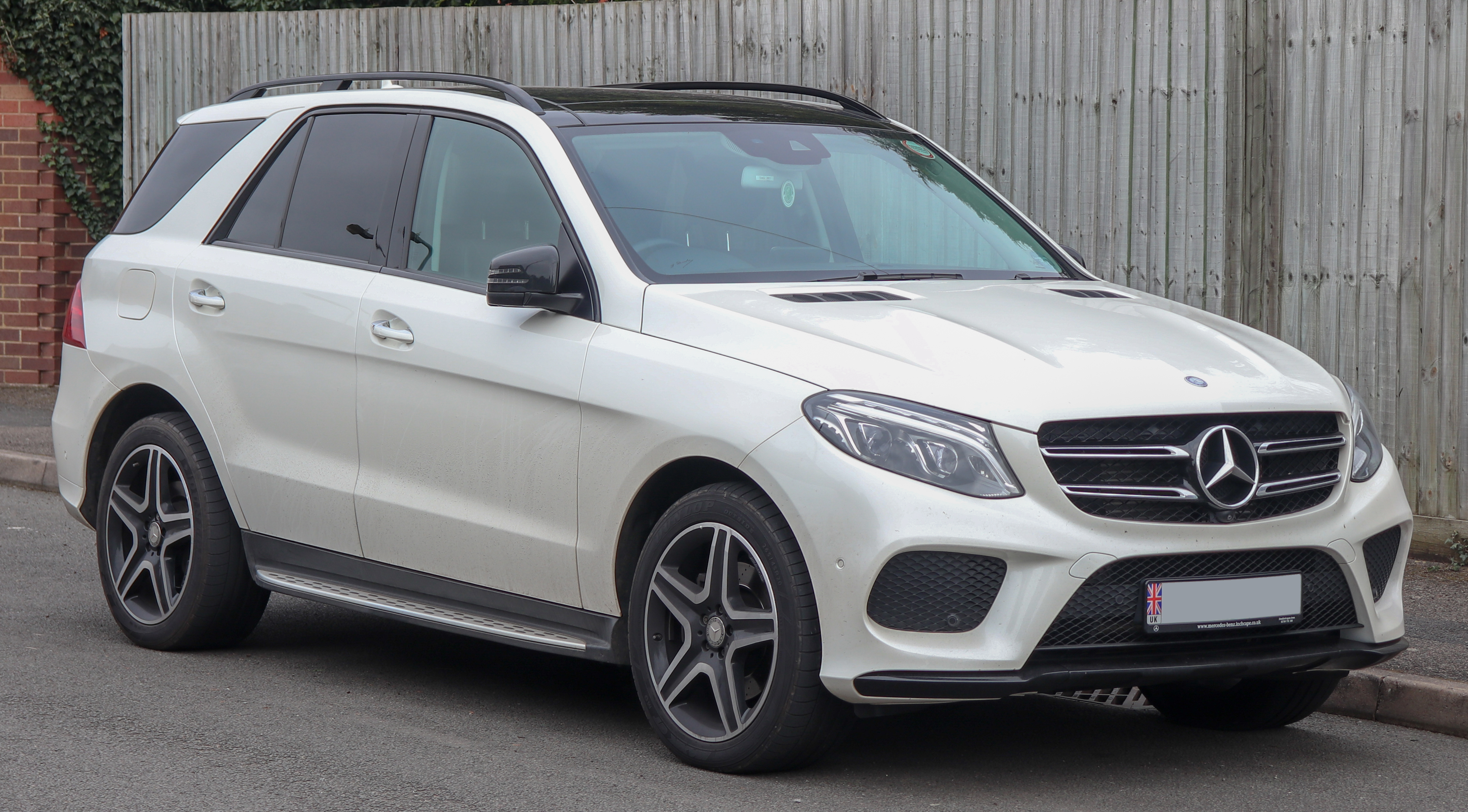

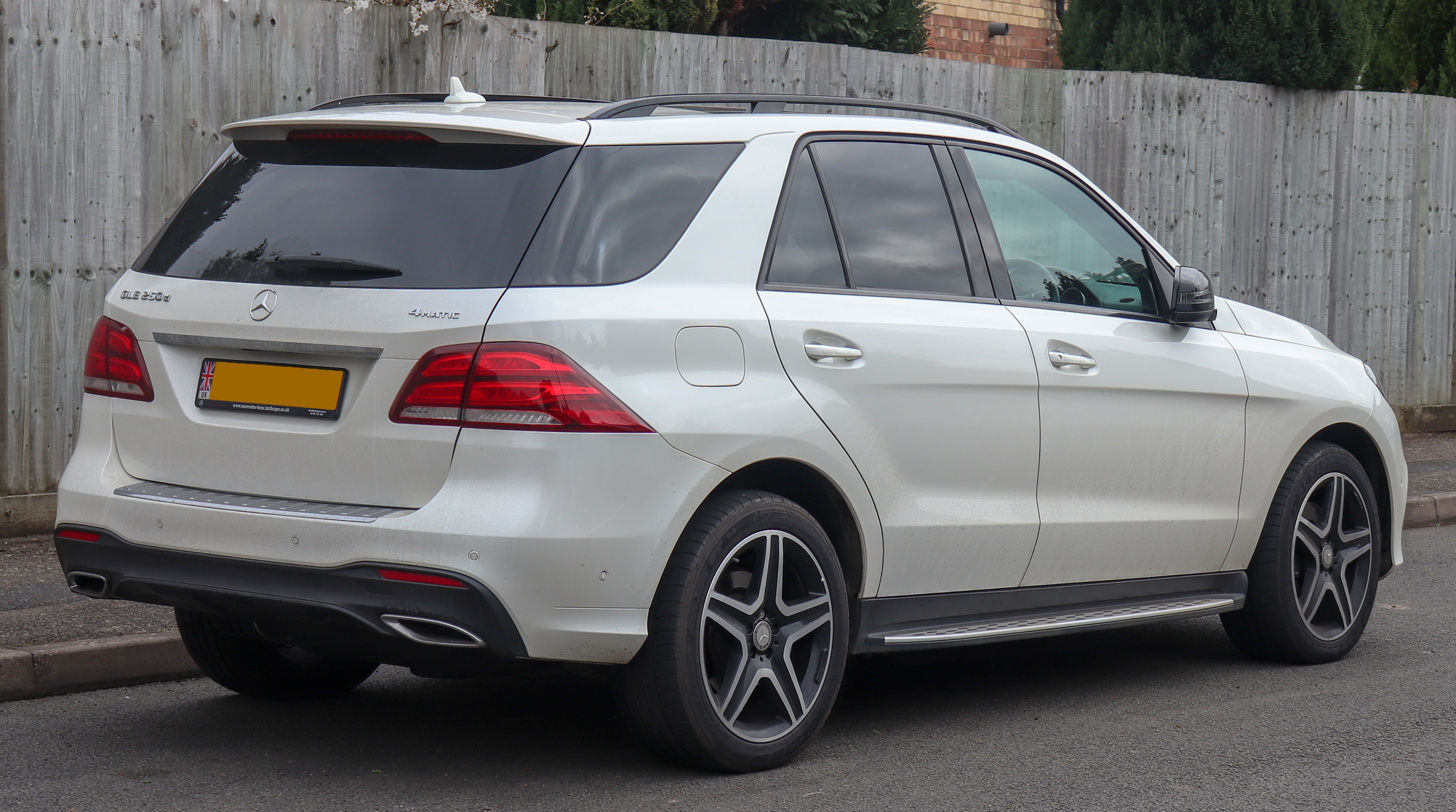
GLE 250d wagon

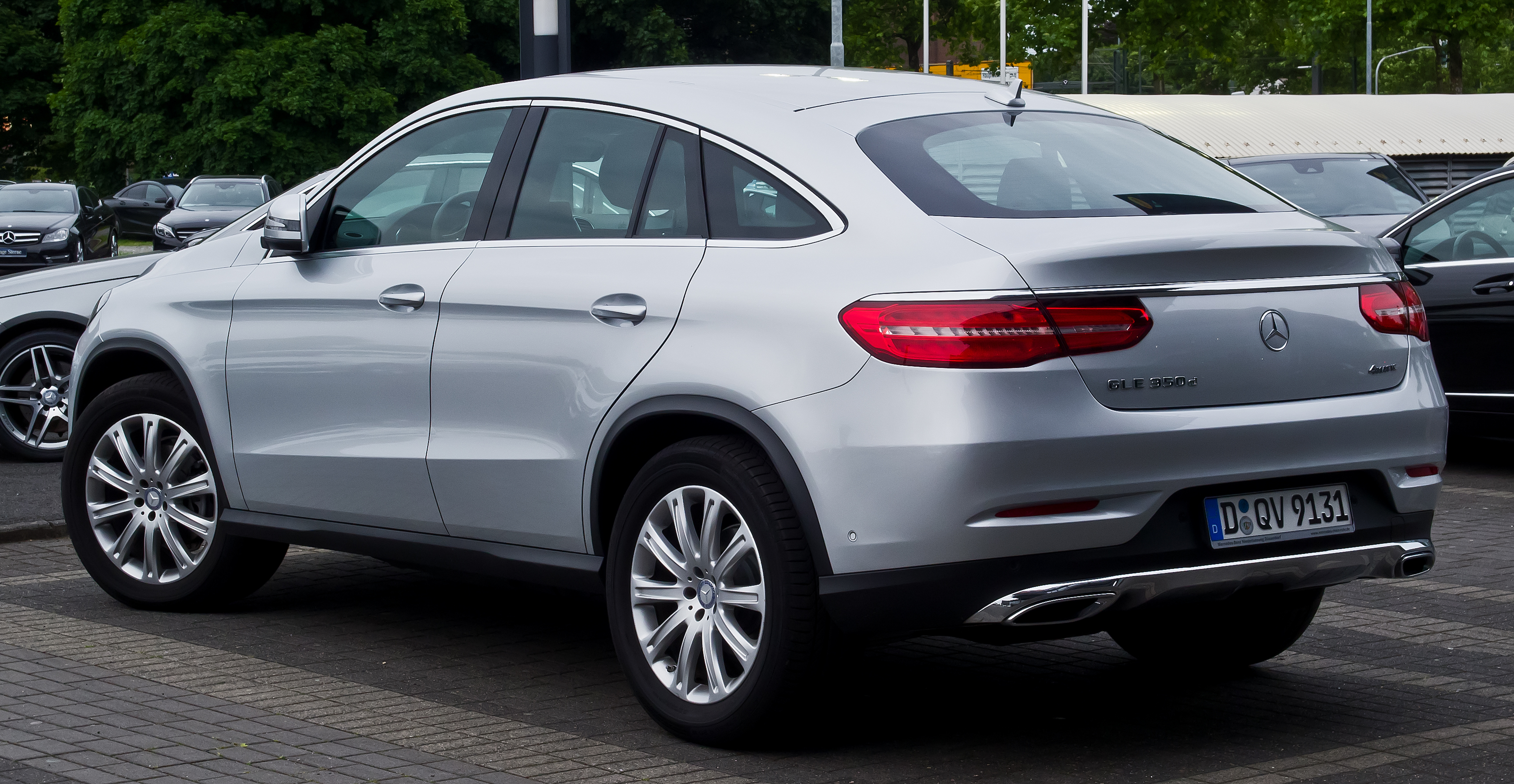
GLE 350d Coupé

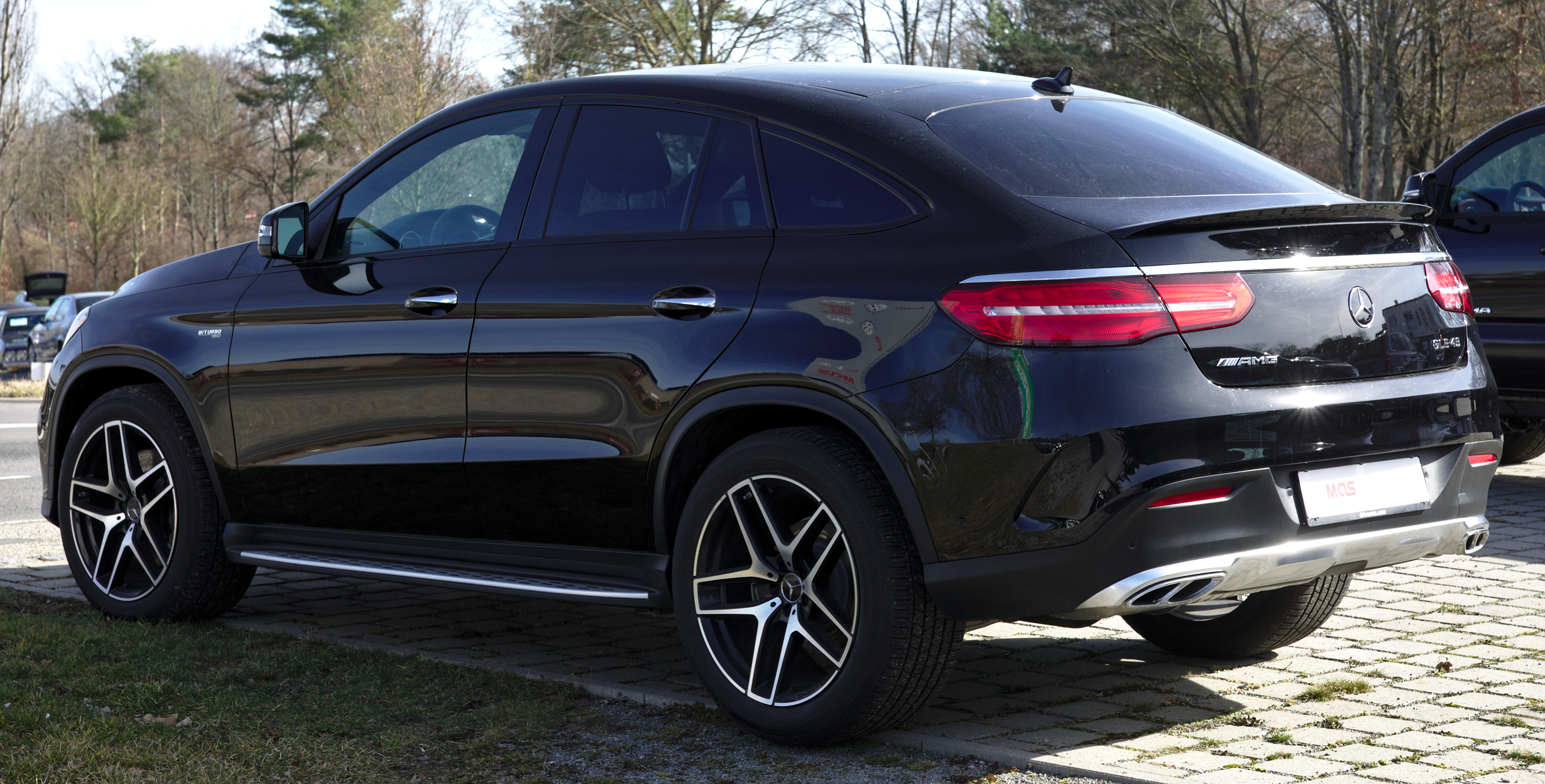
GLE 43 Coupé

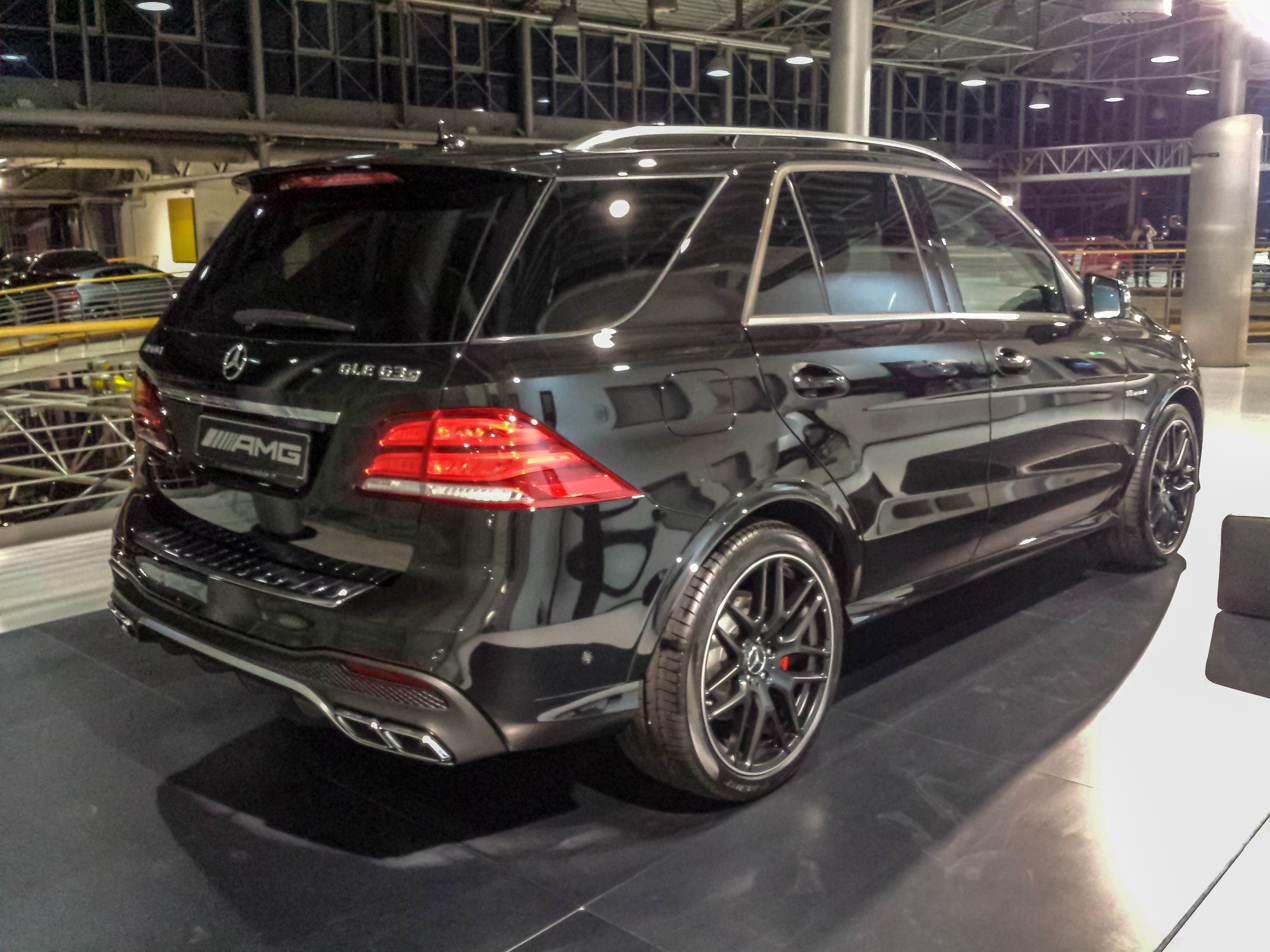
GLE 63 S AMG wagon

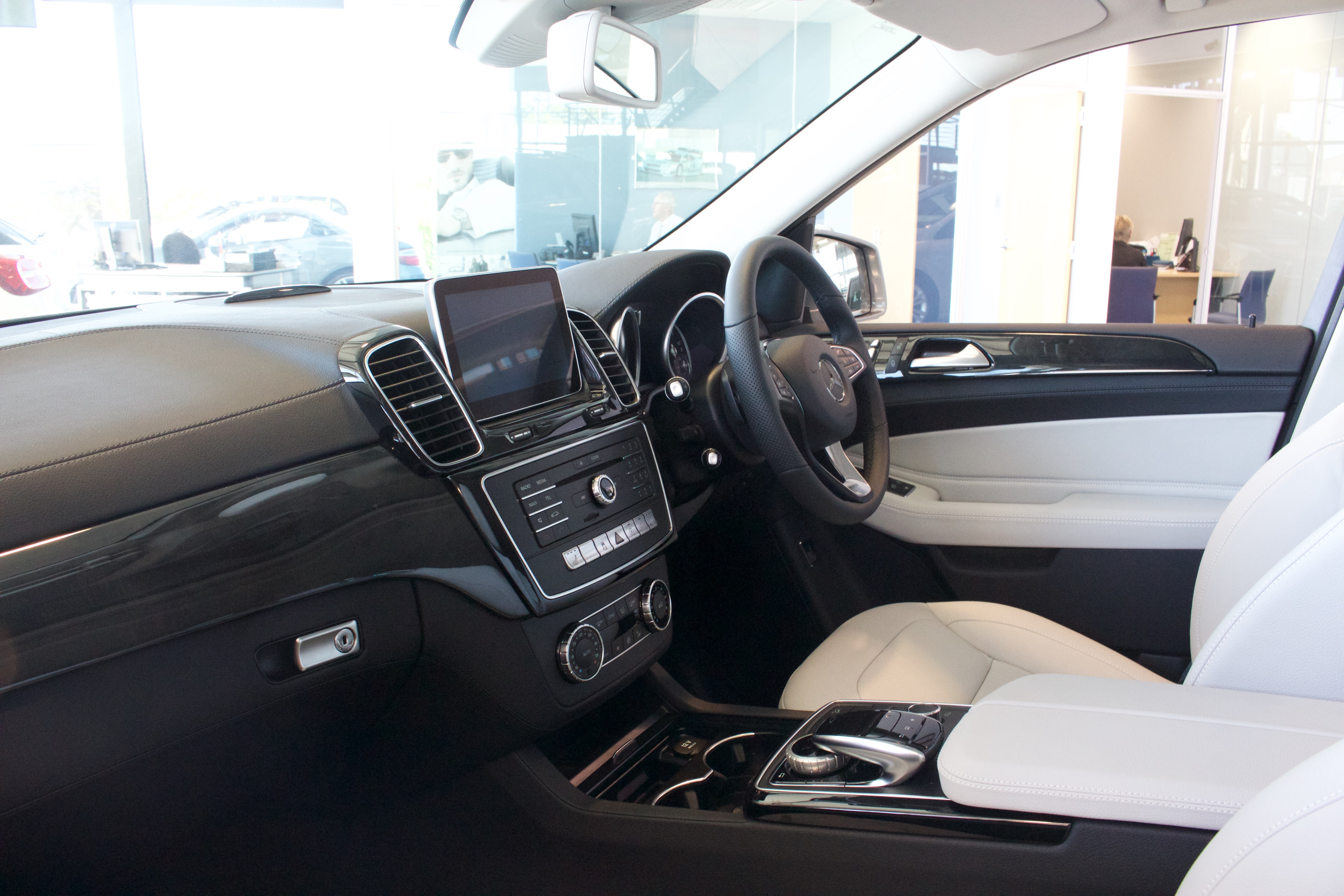
Interior (GLE)

===== SUV (W166) =====
The W166 facelift was unveiled at the New York Auto Show. The GLE 500 e is the first plug-in hybrid in this model range, combining a 333 hp V6 engine with a 116 hp electric motor. The first 19 units were delivered in the American market in June 2016.

===== Coupé (C292) =====
The GLE Coupé (C292) is the coupé SUV version and is heavily related to the W166, sharing its platform, mechanicals and interior (but having a unique body with a similar design). The C292 coupé was unveiled to the public in January 2015 at the North American International Auto Show, it was discontinued in August 2019 after the introduction of the W167.

The GLE Coupé was built in Alabama with the GLE on which it is based. Sales are expected from the second half of 2015. The range is topped by the Mercedes-AMG GLE 63 S-Model, powered by 5.5-liter twin turbo V8 producing 585 bhp and 768 Nm of torque, making it one of the quickest in its segment.

=== Safety ===
NHTSA		Euro NCAP	
Overall:	5/5 stars	Overall:	5/5 stars
Frontal – Driver:	5/5 stars	Adult occupant:	pts / 96%
Frontal – Passenger:	5/5 stars	Child occupant:	pts / %
Side – Driver:	5/5 stars	Pedestrian:	pts / 60%
Side – Passenger:	5/5 stars	Driver assist:	pts / %
Side Pole – Driver:	5/5 stars		
Rollover:	/ 17.9%		

IIHS scores
Category	Rating
Moderate overlap frontal offset	Good
Small overlap frontal offset (Nov 2013–present)	Good^{1}
Side impact	Good
Roof strength	Good^{2}

^{1} vehicle structure rated "Acceptable"
^{2} strength-to-weight ratio: 6.68

ANCAP test results* Mercedes-Benz M-Class ML350 3.5L petrol V6 variants (2011)
Test	Score
Overall	5 /5 stars
Frontal offset	15.34/16
Side impact	16/16
Pole	2/2
Seat belt reminders	3/3
Whiplash protection	Not Assessed
Pedestrian protection	Adequate
Electronic stability control	Standard

== Fourth generation (W167/C167; 2018) ==
Mercedes-Benz GLE (W167/C167)
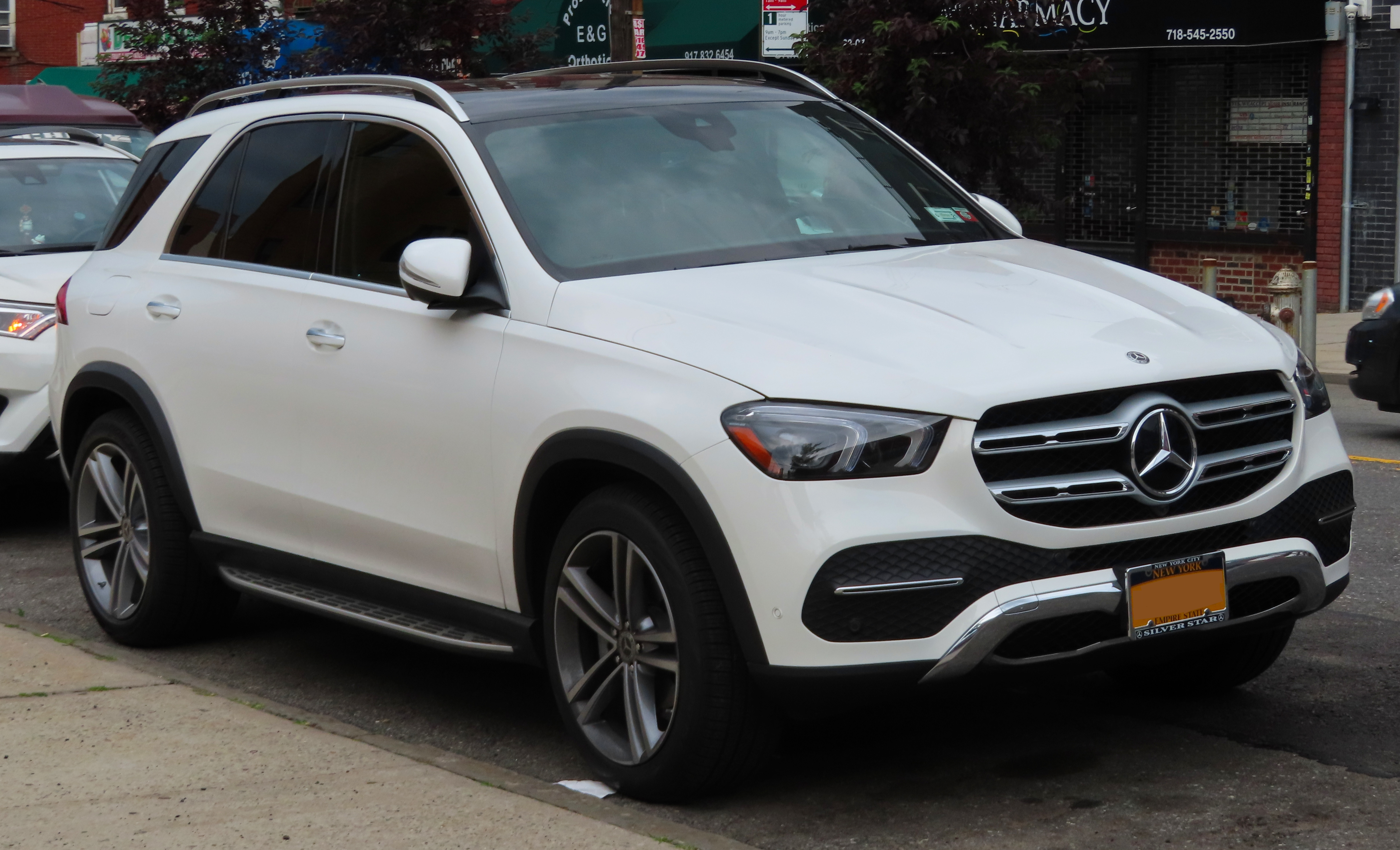
- 2020 GLE 350

Overview
- Model code: W167; C167 (Coupé)
- Production: October 2018–present
- Model years: 2020–present
- Assembly: United States: Tuscaloosa, Alabama (MBUSI); Egypt: 6th of October City (EGA); India: Pune, Maharashtra (MBI); Indonesia: Bogor (MBDI / Inchcape Indomobil); Thailand: Samut Prakan (TAAP); Malaysia: Pekan (HICOM); China: Beijing (Beijing Benz for L models, from 2026)
- Designer: Robert Lešnik, Balázs Filczer, Michael Frei

Body and chassis
- Body style: 5-door SUV; 5-door coupe SUV
- Related: Mercedes-Benz GLS (X167)

Powertrain
- Engine: Gasoline: 2.0 L M264 turbocharged I4; 2.0 L M274 PHEV turbocharged I4; 2.5 L M256 mild hybrid turbo I6 (China); 3.0 L M256 mild hybrid Turbo I6; 3.0 L M256 PHEV Turbo I6; 4.0 L M176 bi-turbo V8; 4.0 L M177 mild hybrid bi-turbo V8; Diesel: 2.0 L OM654 turbodiesel I4; 2.0 L OM654 PHEV turbodiesel I4; 2.9 L OM656 turbodiesel I6; 3.0 L OM656 turbodiesel I6
- Transmission: 9-speed 9G-Tronic automatic
- Hybrid drivetrain: Plug-in hybrid (GLE 350e, GLE 350de, GLE 400e, and AMG GLE 53 Hybrid)

Dimensions
- Wheelbase: 2,995 mm (117.9 in); 3,115 mm (122.6 in) (GLE L, China)
- Length: 4,924–4,930 mm (193.9–194.1 in); 5,051 mm (198.9 in) (GLE L, China)
- Width: 2,015–2,018 mm (79.3–79.4 in); 2,157 mm (84.9 in) (with mirrors)
- Height: 1,795–1,797 mm (70.7–70.7 in)
- Curb weight: 2,130 kg (4,696 lb)

The fourth generation GLE was unveiled at the 2018 Paris Motor Show.

At launch, the GLE was sold in the U.S. with two engine options. The GLE 350 has a 2.0-liter 4-cylinder engine with 255 hp (259 PS; 190 kW) and the GLE 450 has a 3.0-liter, inline-6, turbocharged engine with 362 hp (367 PS; 270 kW) and 369 lb⋅ft (500 N⋅m) of torque. The GLE 450 has a 48V electric system with an integrated starter motor. The system powers the air-conditioner, in-car electronics and the electronically driven turbocharger. The GLE 450 features a refined Active Body Control system, that does away with mechanical roll bars, notably enhancing performance.

Other engine options are also available. The AMG GLE 53 was introduced at the 2019 Geneva Motor Show in March. It has a 3.0 L turbocharged I6 producing 429 hp (435 PS; 320 kW) and 384 lb⋅ft (521 N⋅m) of torque. A 48V electric system like in the GLE 450 features EQ Boost for an extra 21 hp (16 kW) and 184 lb⋅ft (249 N⋅m) torque on demand.

For the first time under the "GLE" name, the GLE also adds a seven-seat option.

=== Plug-in hybrid ===
In the European market, two plug-in hybrid versions are available: the GLE 350e, using a gasoline engine, and the GLE 350de, using a diesel engine. Both use a 31.2-kWh battery. The vehicle can be equipped with a 60 kW quick charging option. The declared WLTP all-electric range is 90 to 99 km (56 to 62 mi).

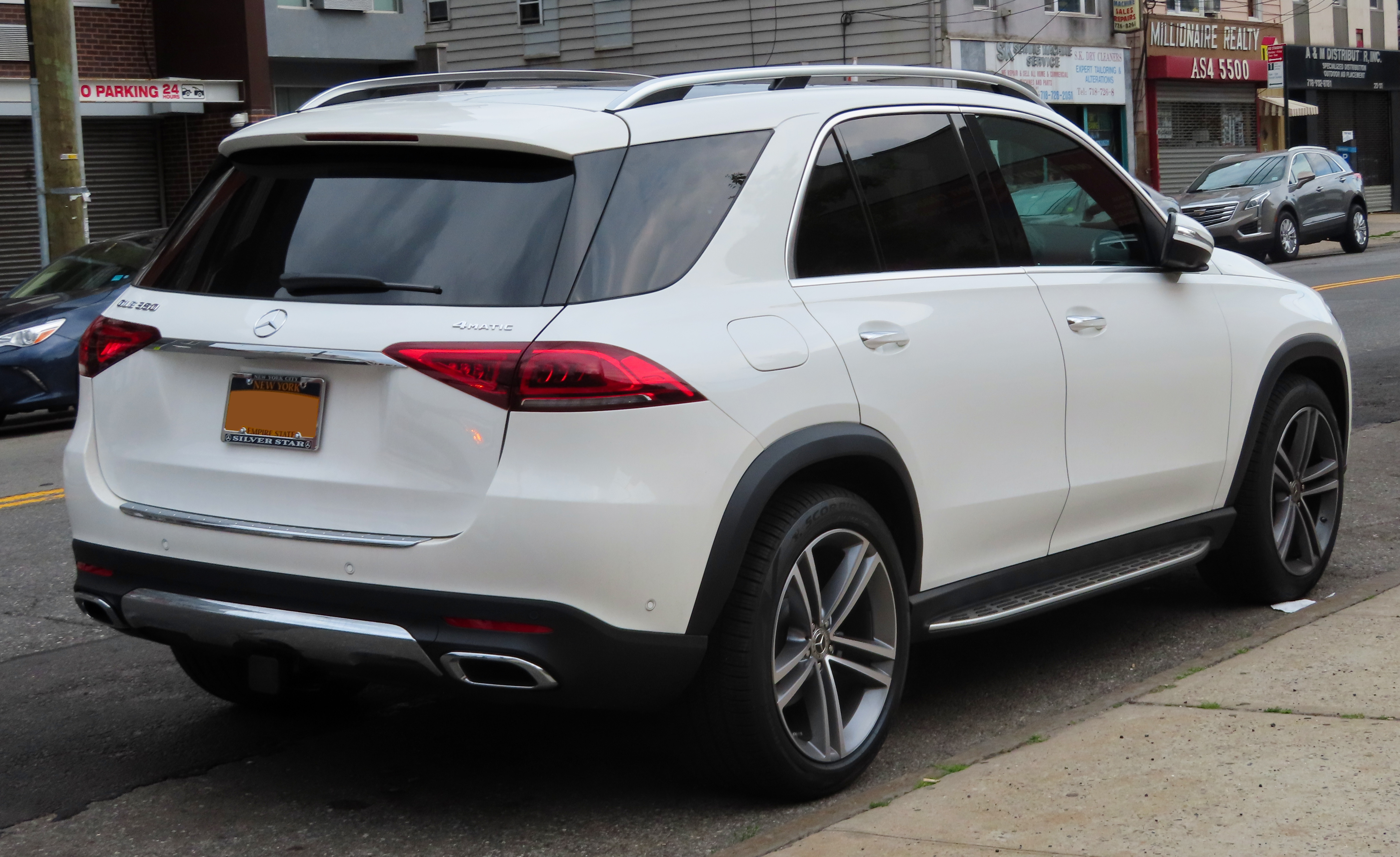
Mercedes-Benz GLE 350

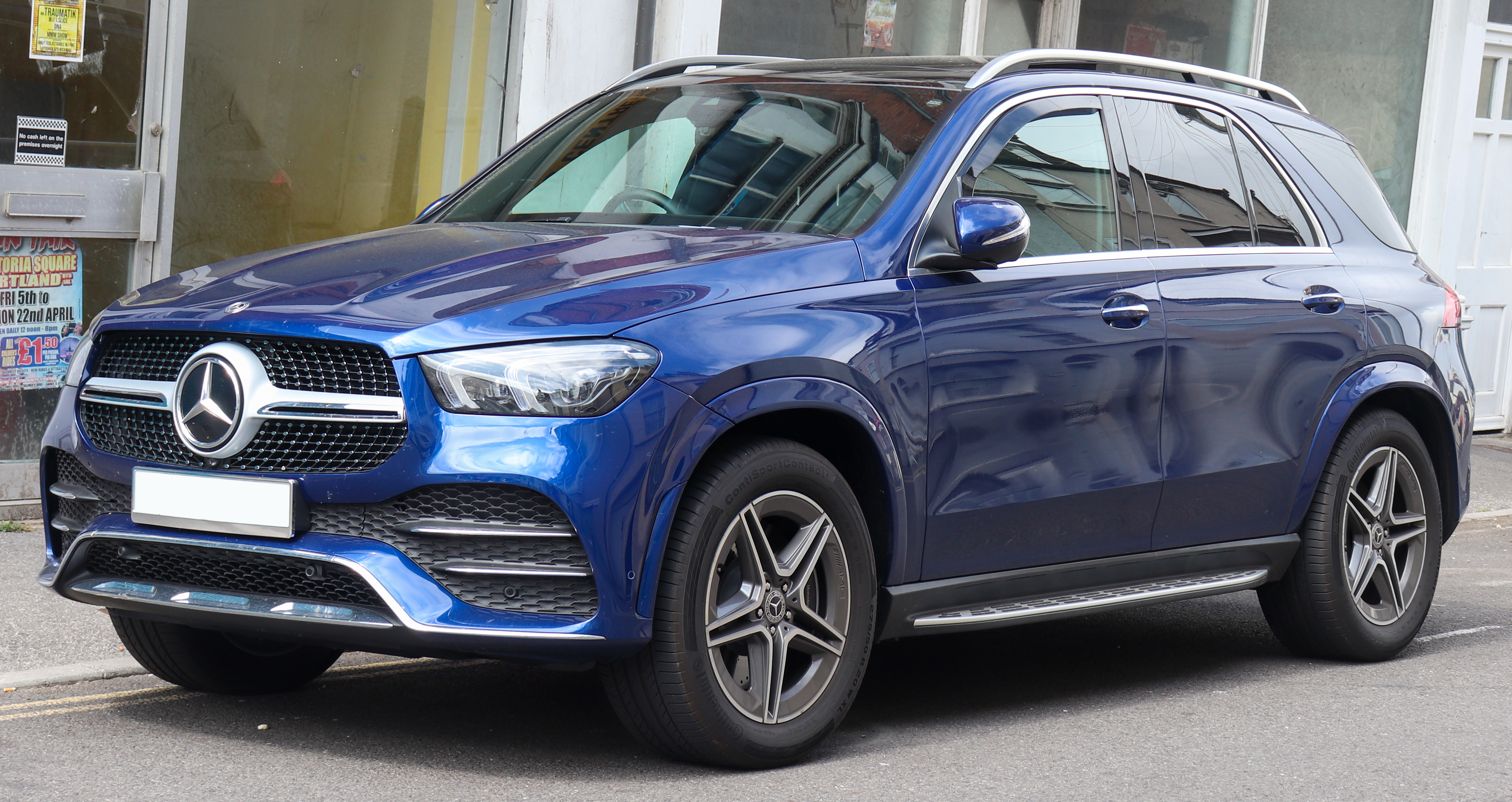
Mercedes-Benz GLE 450

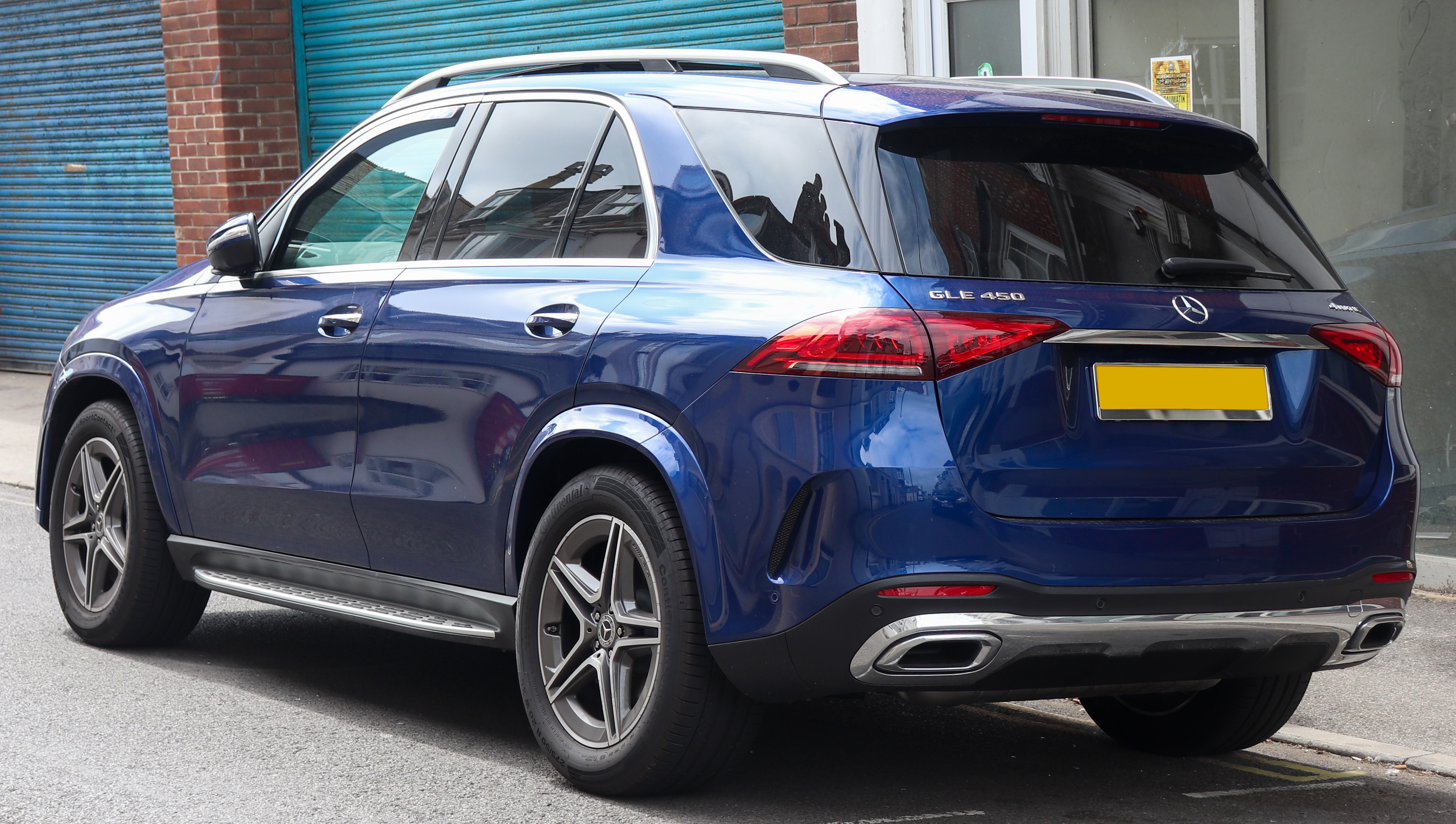
Mercedes-Benz GLE 450

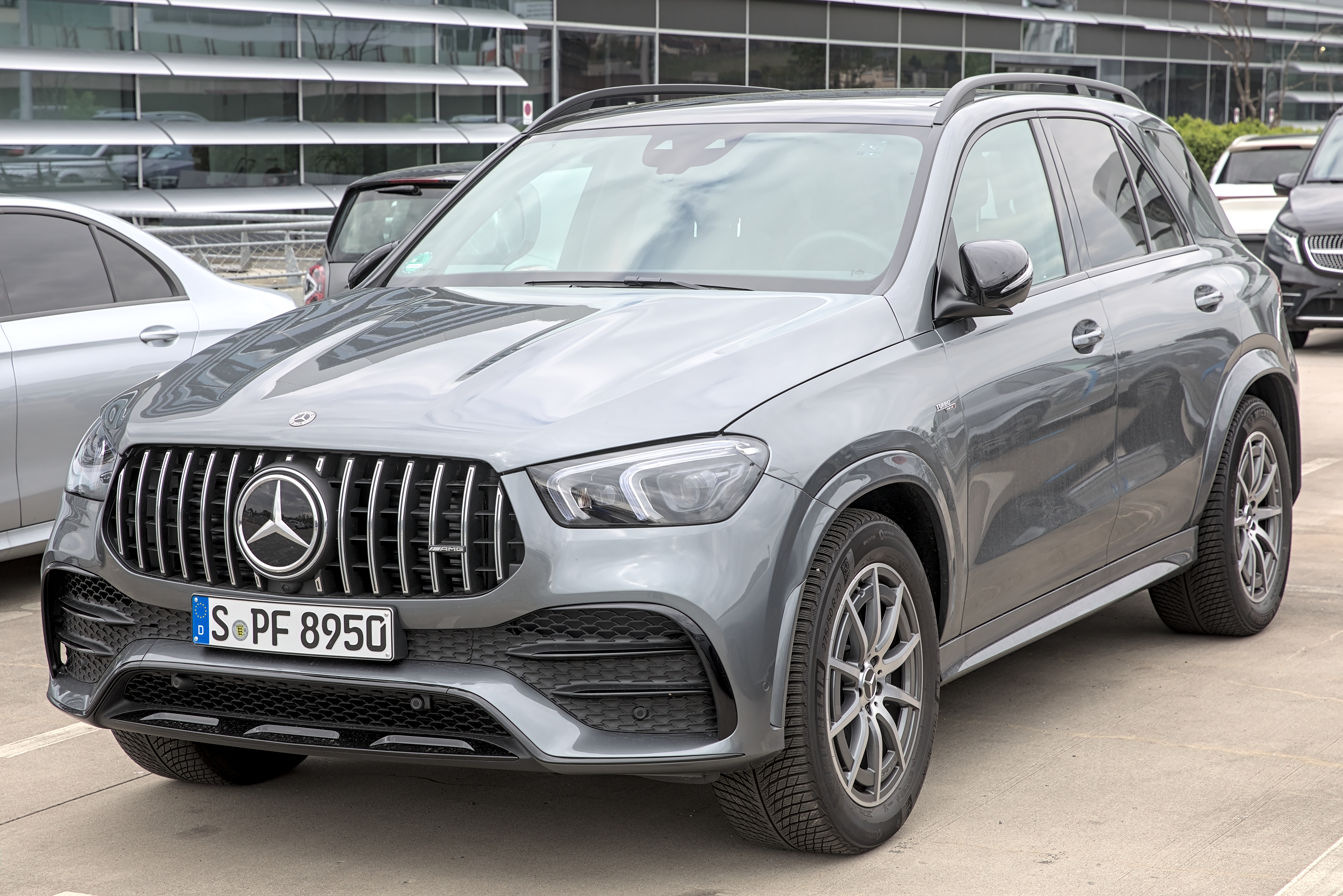
Mercedes-AMG GLE 53

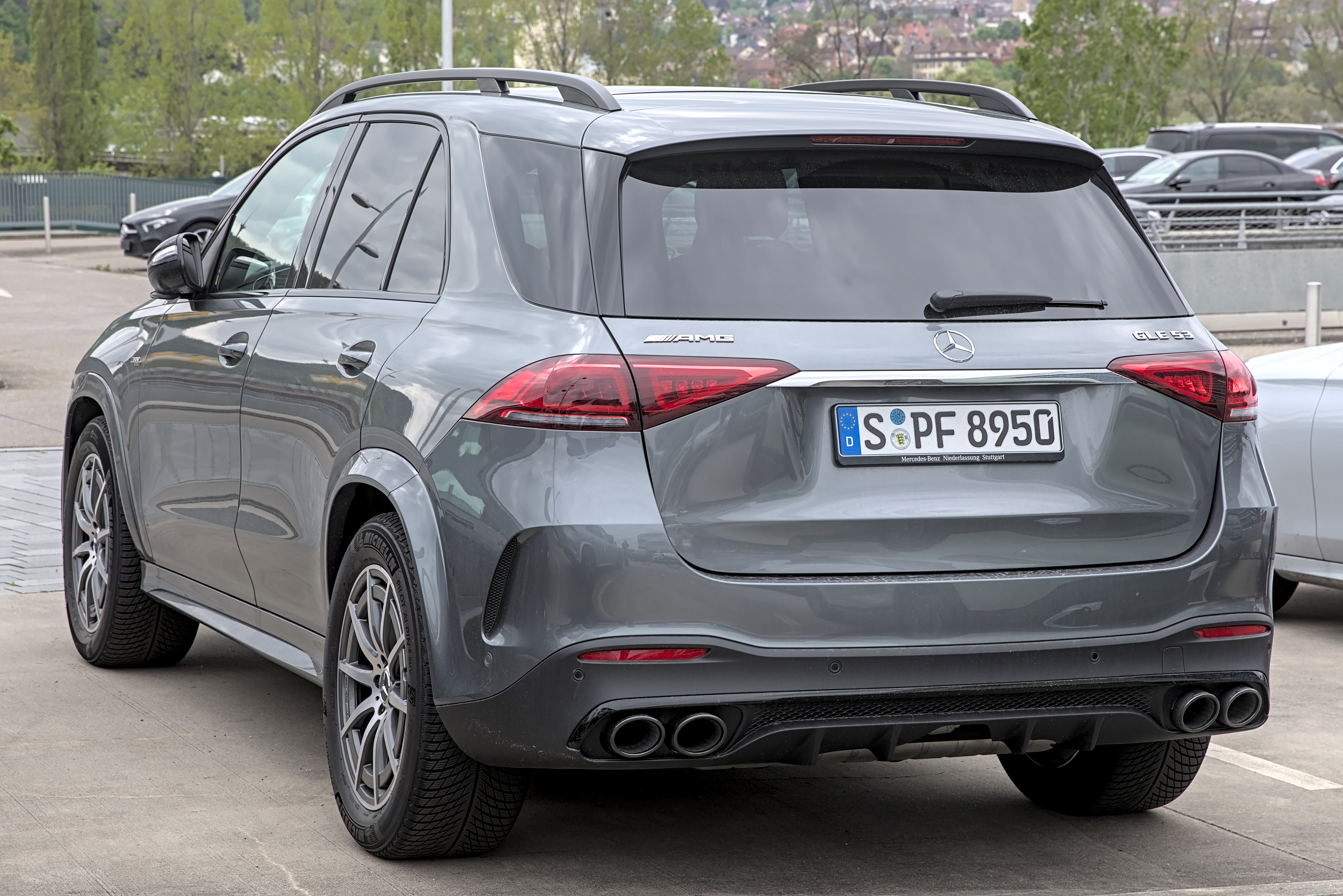
Mercedes-AMG GLE 53

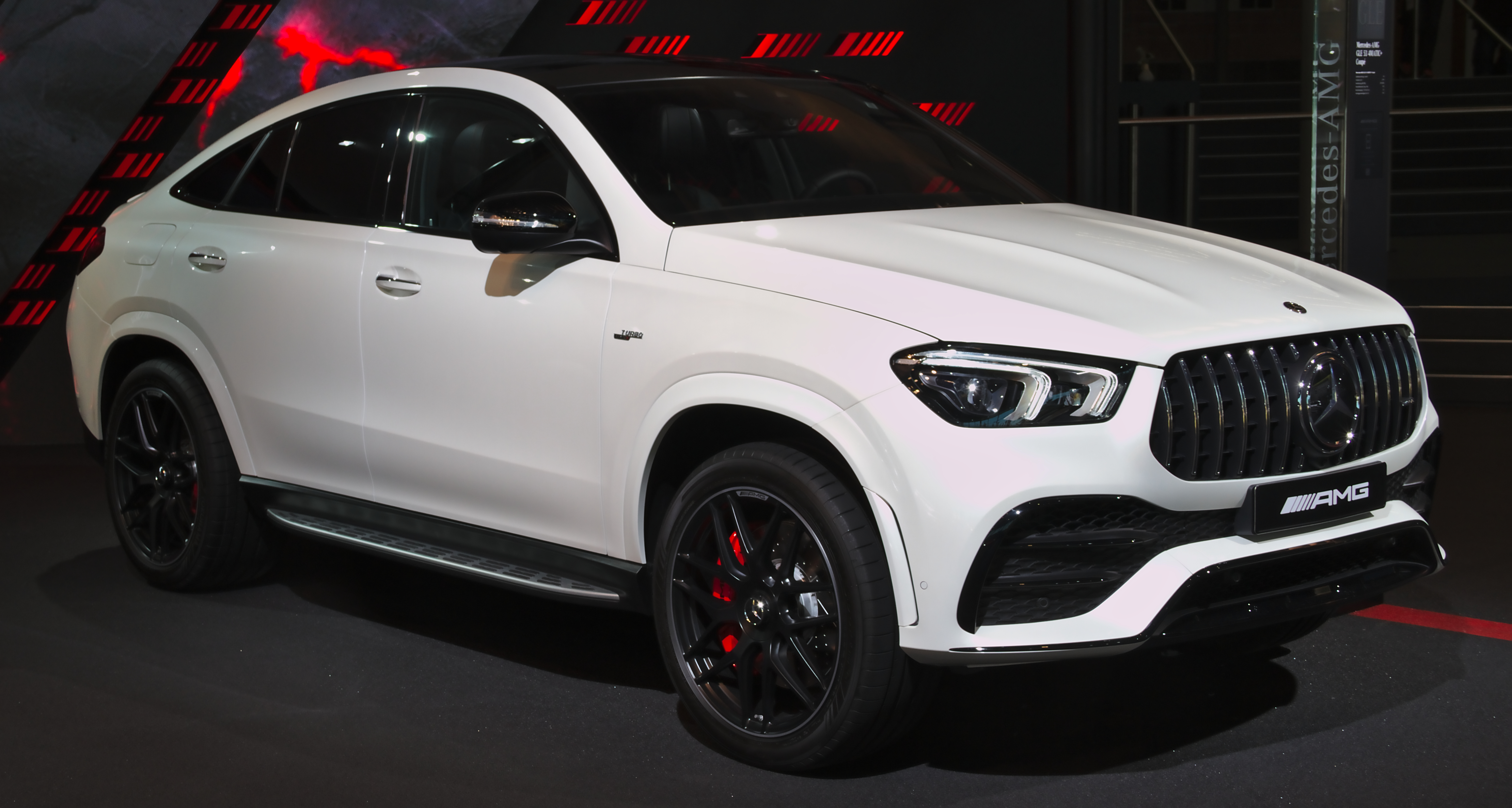
Mercedes-AMG GLE 53 Coupe

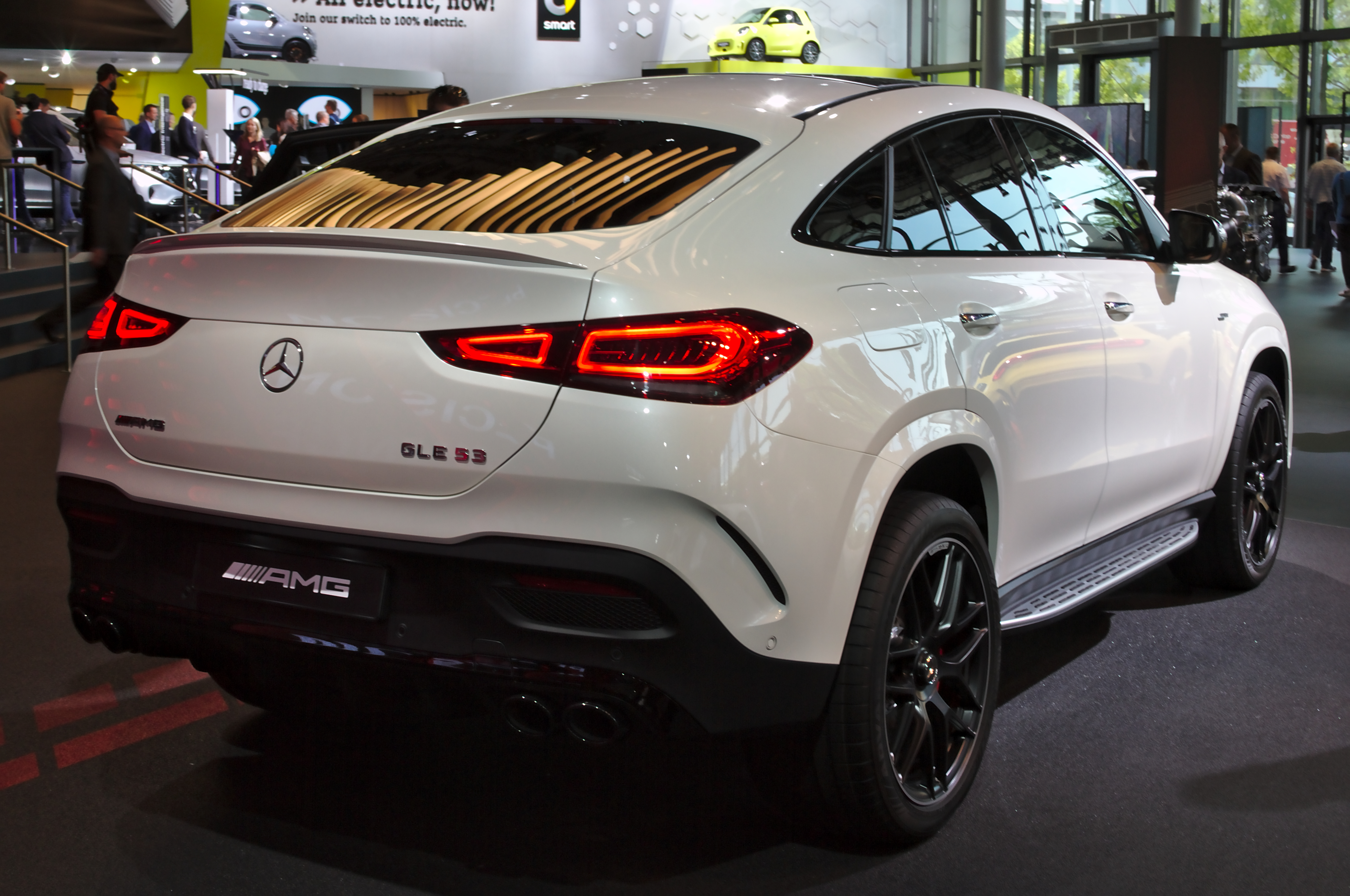
Mercedes-AMG GLE 53 Coupe

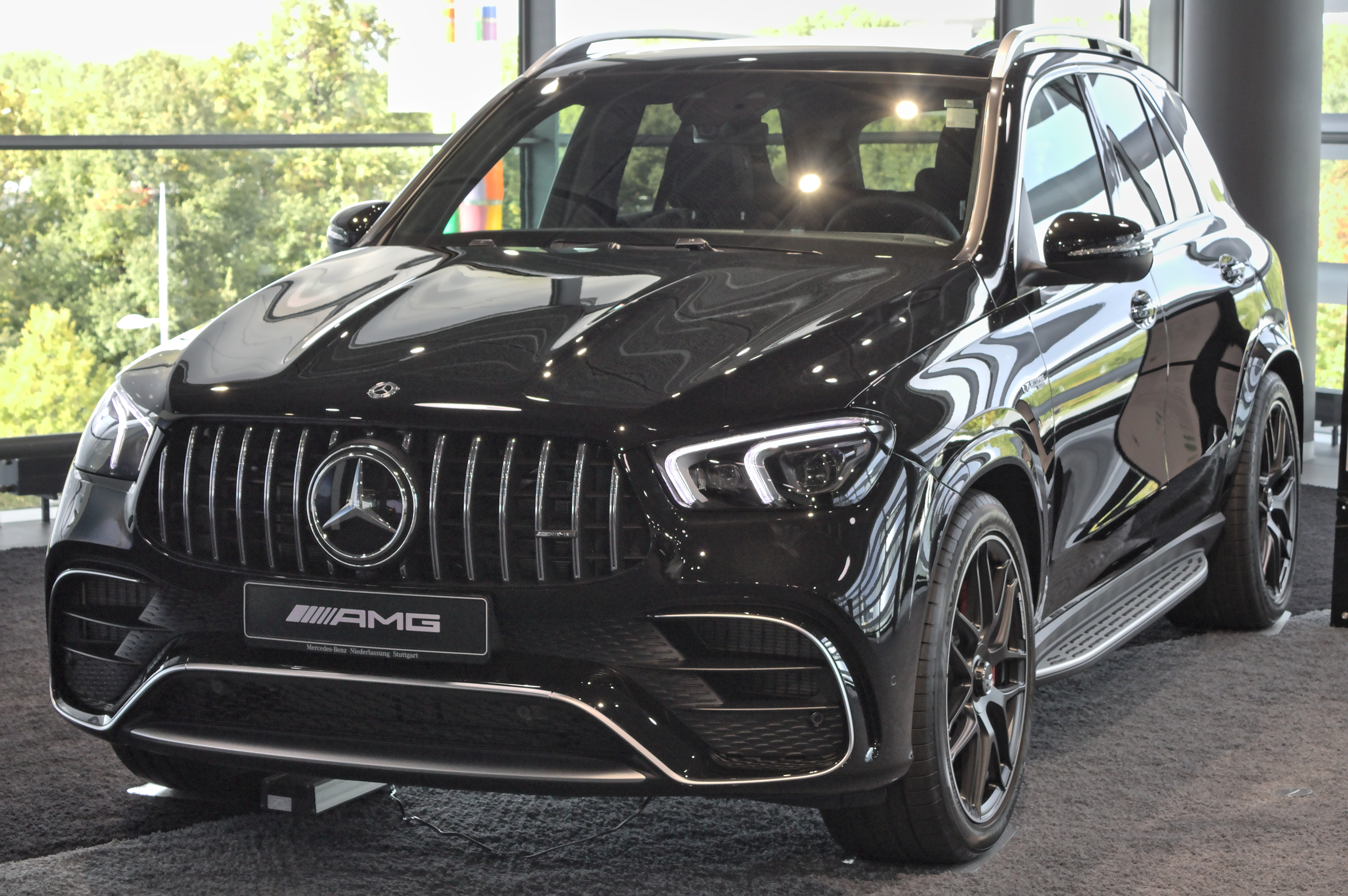
Mercedes-AMG GLE 63 S

=== 2023 facelift ===
In January 2023, the GLE received a facelift for the 2024 model year, adding completely restyled headlights and taillights, a new steering wheel, restyled bumper, newer wheels and a new variant called GLE450e.

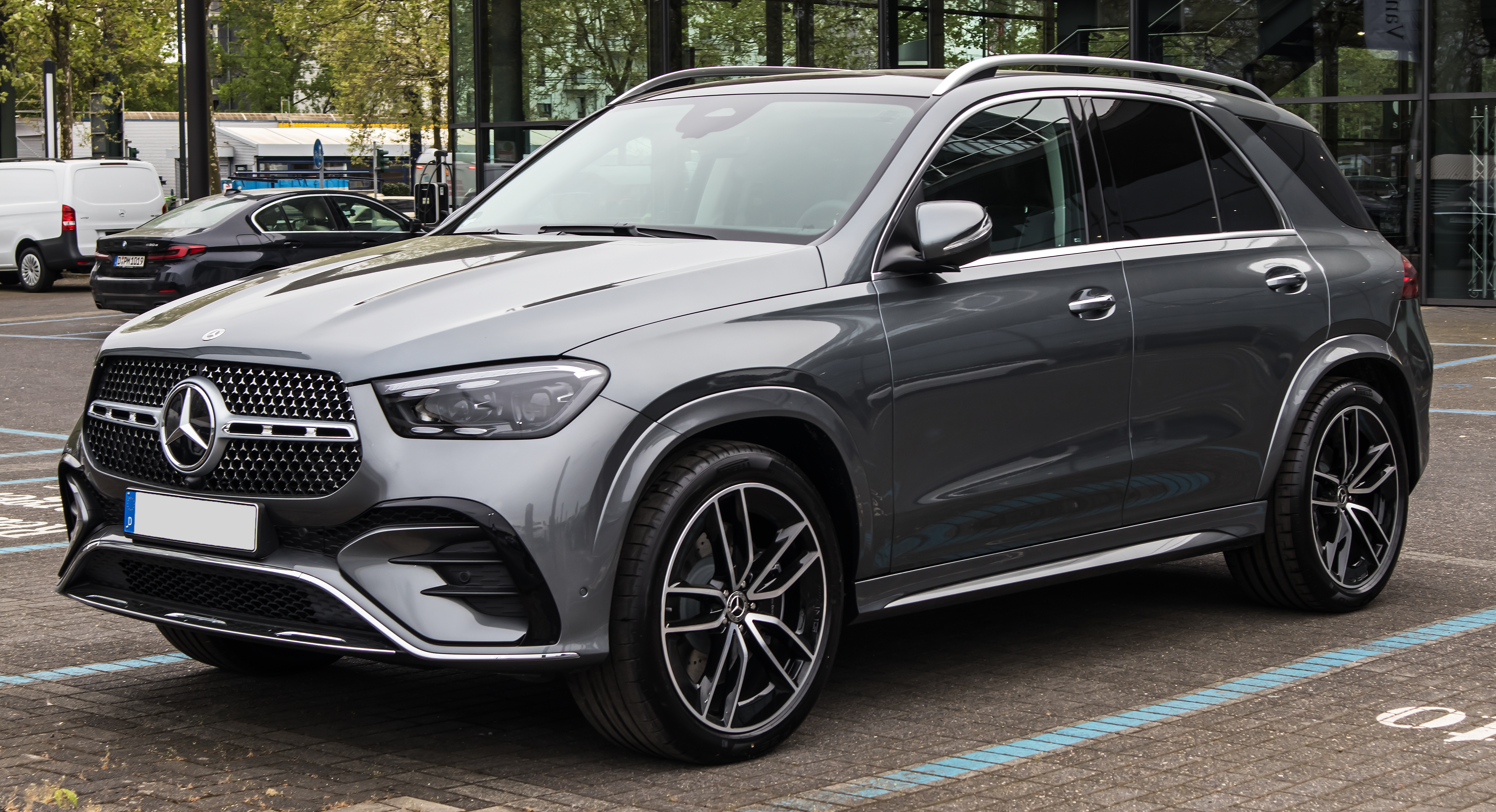
GLE AMG Line (2023 facelift)

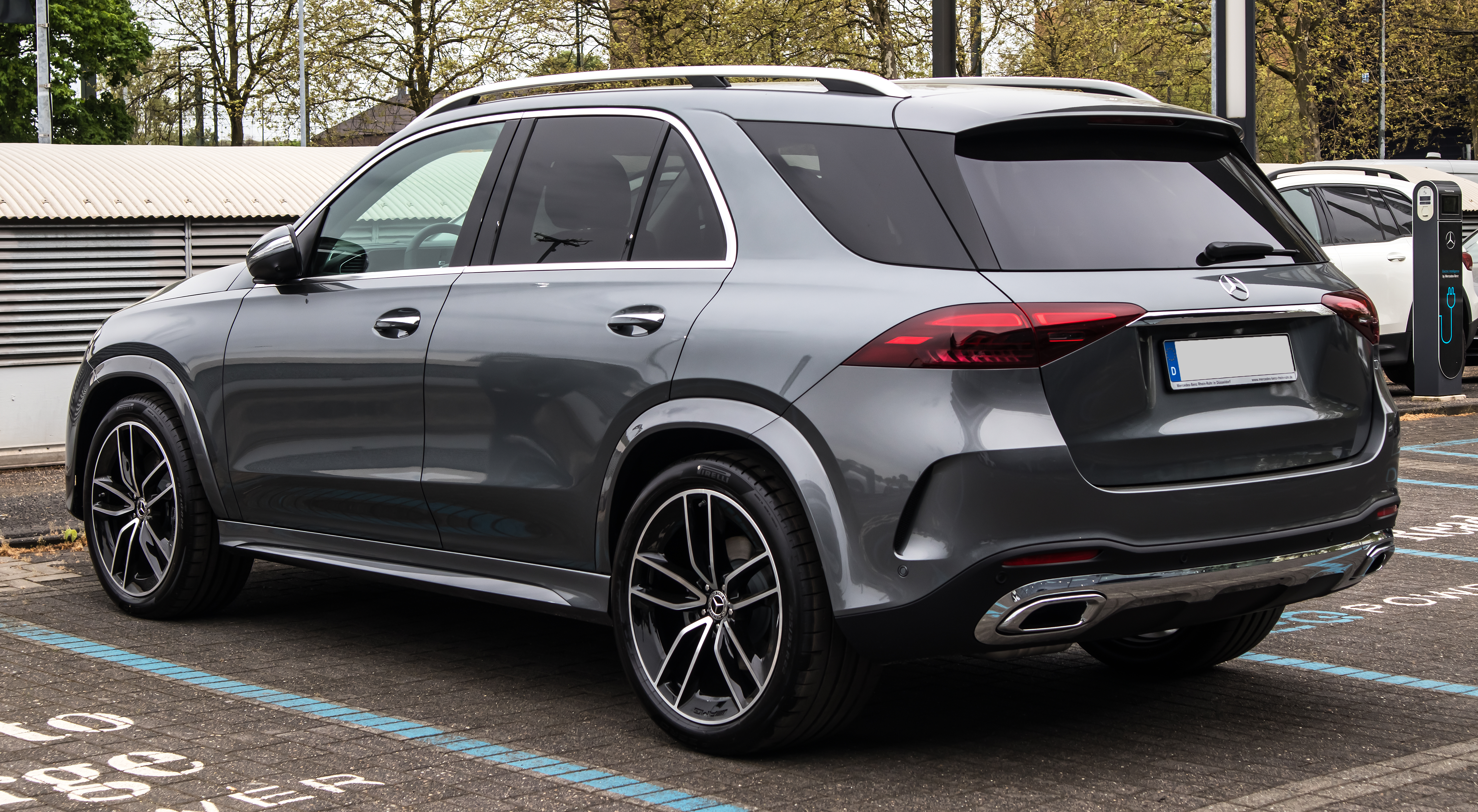
Rear view (2023 facelift)

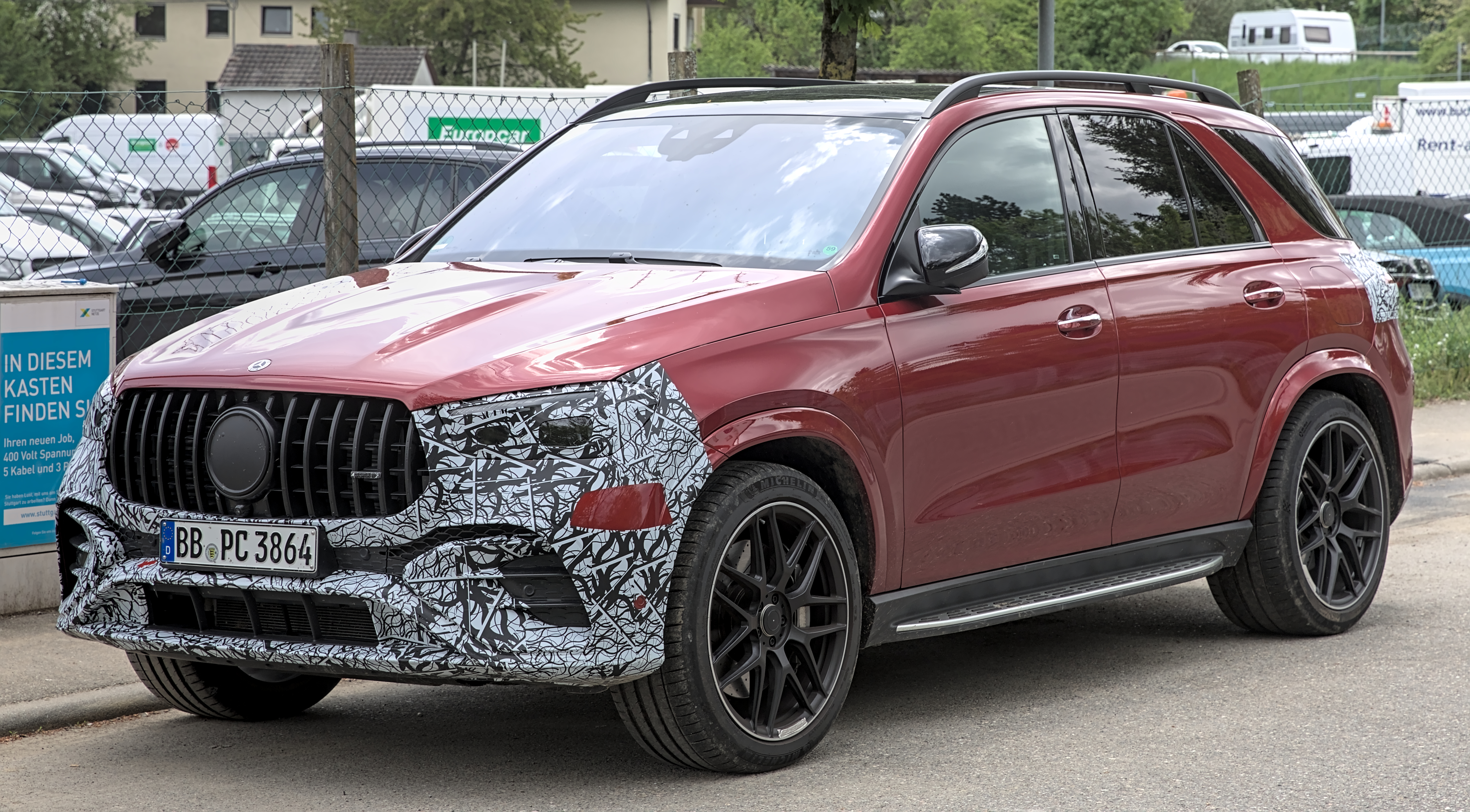
GLE 53 (covered, 2023 facelift)

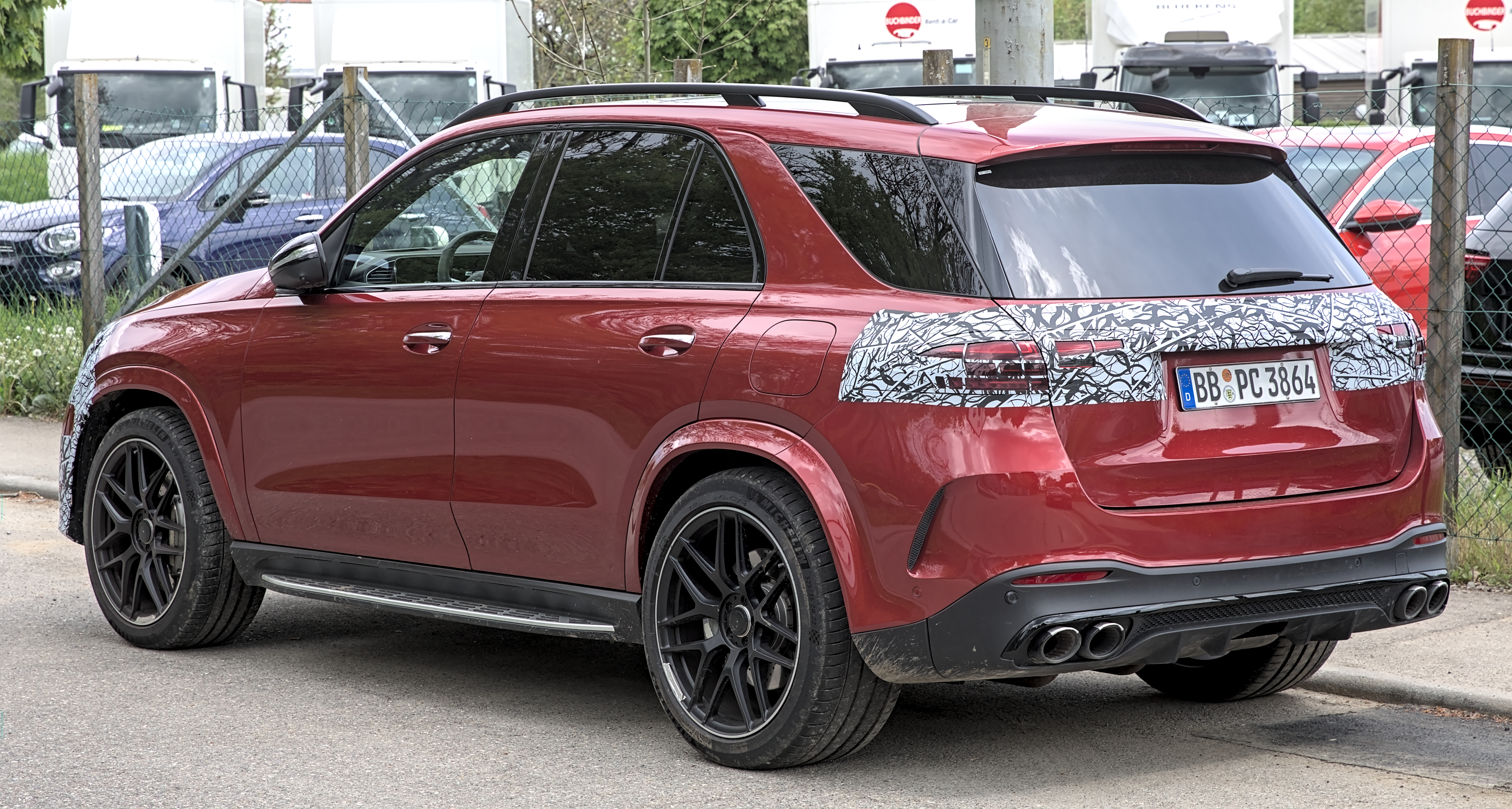
GLE 53 (covered, 2023 facelift)

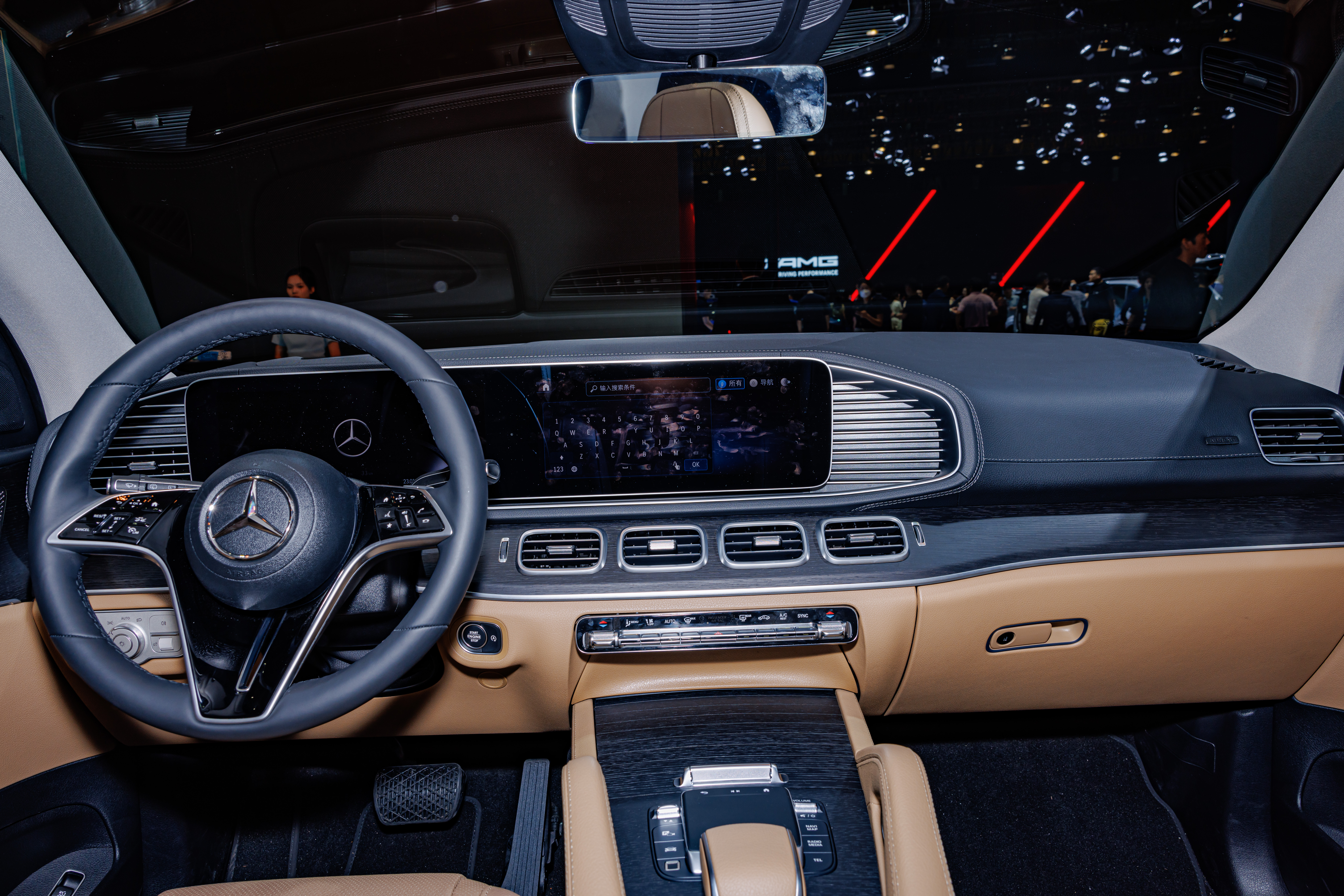
Interior (2023 facelift)

=== 2026 facelift ===
In March 2026, a facelift for the 2027 model year GLE was unveiled before it entered production in August 2026, adding completely restyled headlights and taillights, a new steering wheel, and a restyled bumper.

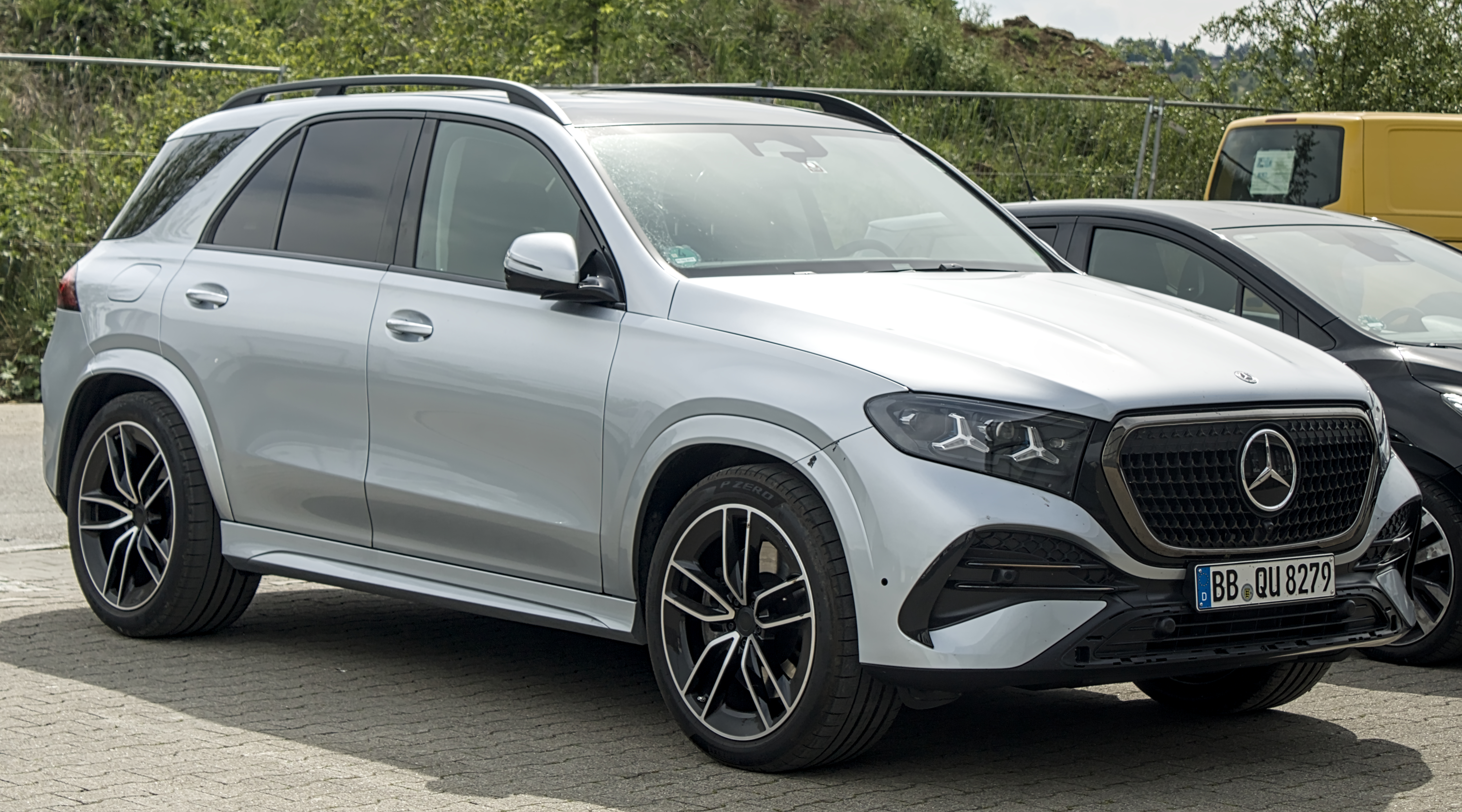
Front

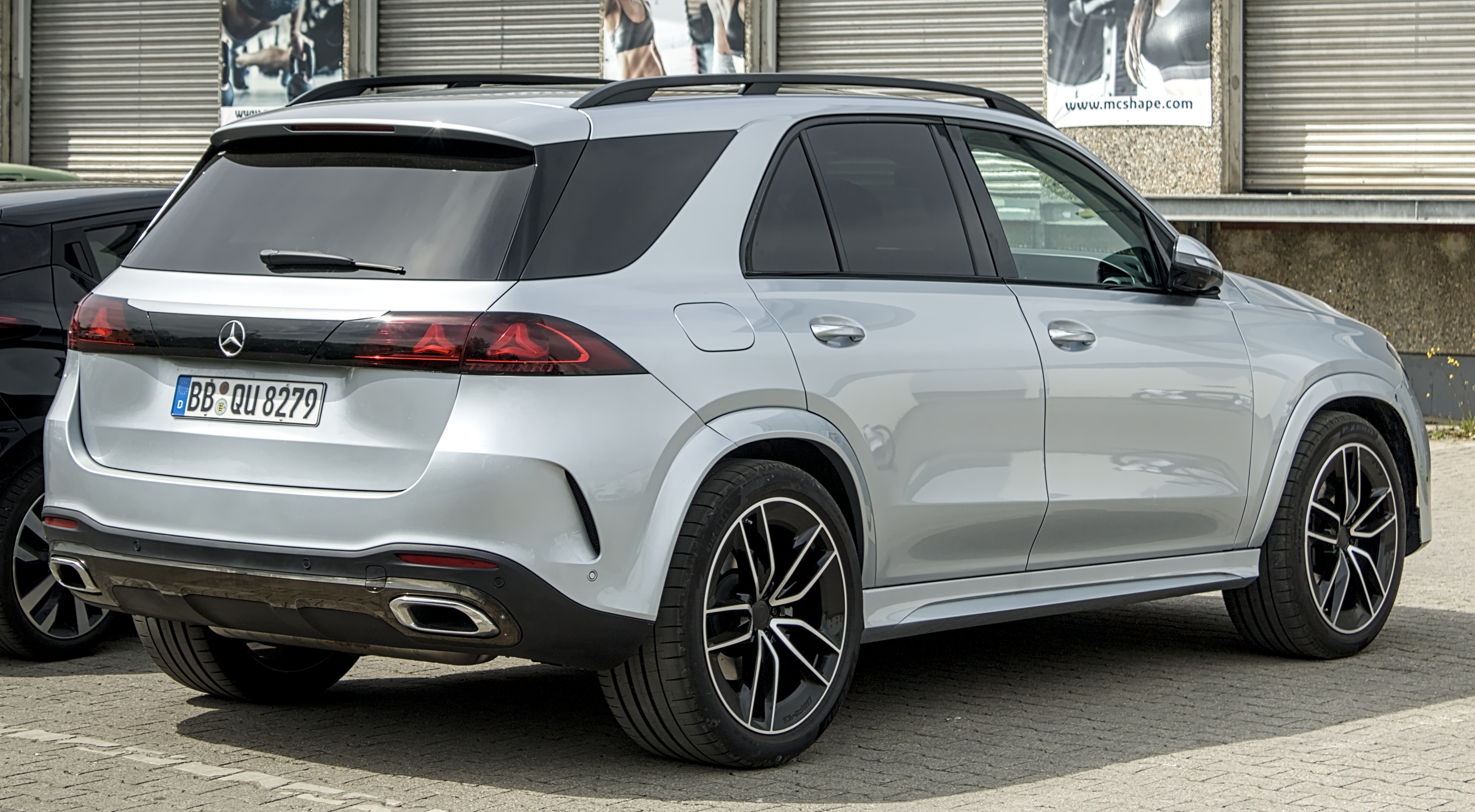
Rear

GLE 53 (2027 facelift)

GLE 53 (2027 facelift)

GLE 53 Interior (2026 facelift)

=== Engines ===
Model	Years	Configuration	Displacement	Power	Torque	0–100 km/h (62 mph)	Top speed
Gasoline engines
GLE 350 / GLE 350 4MATIC	02/2019–01/2023	1,991 cc (121.5 cu in)	Inline-4 Turbo	190 kW (258 PS; 255 hp)	370 N⋅m (273 lbf⋅ft)	7.6 seconds	228 km/h (142 mph)
GLE 350e 4MATIC	02/2019–01/2023	1,991 cc (121.5 cu in)	Inline-4 Turbo + Plug-in hybrid	245 kW (333 PS; 329 hp)	700 N⋅m (516 lbf⋅ft)	6.9 seconds	210 km/h (130 mph)
GLE 400e 4MATIC	02/2023–	1,991 cc (121.5 cu in)	Inline-4 Turbo + Plug-in hybrid	280 kW (381 PS; 375 hp)	650 N⋅m (479 lbf⋅ft)	6.1 seconds	210 km/h (130 mph)
GLE 450 4MATIC (2019)	02/2019–01/2023	2,999 cc (183.0 cu in)	Inline-6 Turbo + EQ Boost	270 kW (367 PS; 362 hp)	500 N⋅m (369 lbf⋅ft)	5.7 seconds	250 km/h (155 mph)
GLE 450 4MATIC (2023)	02/2023–	2,999 cc (183.0 cu in)	Inline-6 Turbo + EQ Boost	284 kW (386 PS; 381 hp)	500 N⋅m (369 lbf⋅ft)	5.6 seconds	250 km/h (155 mph)
AMG GLE 53 4MATIC+ (2020)	2020–23	2,999 cc (183.0 cu in)	Inline-6 Turbo + EQ Boost	320 kW (435 PS; 429 hp)	520 N⋅m (384 lbf⋅ft)	5.3 seconds	250 km/h (155 mph)
AMG GLE 53 4MATIC+ (2023)	2023–	2,999 cc (183.0 cu in)	Inline-6 Turbo + EQ Boost	324 kW (441 PS; 434 hp)	560 N⋅m (413 lbf⋅ft)	5.0 seconds	250 km/h (155 mph)
AMG GLE 53 Hybrid 4MATIC+ (2023)	2023–	2,999 cc (183.0 cu in)	Inline-6 Turbo + Plug-in hybrid	400 kW (544 PS; 536 hp)	750 N⋅m (553 lbf⋅ft)	4.7 seconds	250 km/h (155 mph)
GLE 580 4MATIC (2019)	09/2019– 2023	3,982 cc (243.0 cu in)	V8 Biturbo + EQ Boost	360 kW (489 PS; 483 hp)	700 N⋅m (516 lbf⋅ft)	4.9 seconds	250 km/h (155 mph)
GLE 580 4MATIC (2023)	2023–	3,982 cc (243.0 cu in)	V8 Biturbo + EQ Boost	380 kW (517 PS; 510 hp)	730 N⋅m (538 lbf⋅ft)	4.6 seconds	250 km/h (155 mph)
AMG GLE 63 4MATIC+	2020–	3,982 cc (243.0 cu in)	V8 Biturbo + EQ Boost	420 kW (571 PS; 563 hp) @ 5750 – 6500 rpm	750 N⋅m (553 lbf⋅ft) @ 2250 – 5000 rpm	4.0 seconds	250 km/h (155 mph); 280 km/h (174 mph) (with AMG Drivers Package)
AMG GLE 63 S 4MATIC+	2020–	3,982 cc (243.0 cu in)	V8 Biturbo + EQ Boost	450 kW (612 PS; 603 hp) @ 5750 – 6500 rpm	850 N⋅m (627 lbf⋅ft) @ 2500 – 4500 rpm	3.8 seconds	280 km/h (174 mph)
Diesel engines
GLE 300d 4MATIC (2019)	09/2019–01/2023	1,950 cc (119 cu in)	Inline-4 Turbo	180 kW (245 PS; 241 hp)	500 N⋅m (369 lbf⋅ft)	7.2 seconds	225 km/h (140 mph)
GLE 300d 4MATIC (2023)	02/2023–	1,950 cc (119 cu in)	Inline-4 Turbo + EQ Boost	201 kW (273 PS; 270 hp)	550 N⋅m (406 lbf⋅ft)	6.9 seconds	230 km/h (143 mph)
GLE 350de 4MATIC (2019)	09/2019–01/2023	1,950 cc (119 cu in)	Inline-4 Turbo + Plug-in hybrid	235 kW (320 PS; 315 hp)	700 N⋅m (516 lbf⋅ft)	6.8 seconds	210 km/h (130 mph)
GLE 350de 4MATIC (2023)	02/2023–	1,950 cc (119 cu in)	Inline-4 Turbo + Plug-in hybrid	248 kW (337 PS; 333 hp)	750 N⋅m (553 lbf⋅ft)	6.9 seconds	210 km/h (130 mph)
GLE 350d 4MATIC	09/2019–01/2023	2,927 cc (178.6 cu in)	Inline-6 Turbo	200 kW (272 PS; 268 hp)	600 N⋅m (443 lbf⋅ft)	6.9 seconds	230 km/h (143 mph)
GLE 400d 4MATIC	09/2019–01/2023	2,927 cc (178.6 cu in)	Inline-6 Turbo	243 kW (330 PS; 326 hp)	700 N⋅m (516 lbf⋅ft)	5.8 seconds	240 km/h (149 mph)
GLE 450d 4MATIC	02/2023–	2,927 cc (178.6 cu in)	Inline-6 Turbo + EQ Boost	273 kW (371 PS; 366 hp)	750 N⋅m (553 lbf⋅ft)	5.6 seconds	250 km/h (155 mph)

=== Safety ===
==== ANCAP ====
ANCAP test results* Mercedes-Benz GLE all variants excluding AMG (see ANCAP Technical Report) (2019, aligned with Euro NCAP)
Test	Points	%
Overall:	5 /5 stars	
Adult occupant:	34.9	91%
Child occupant:	45.2	92%
Pedestrian:	37.8	78%
Safety assist:	10.3	79%

==== Euro NCAP ====
Euro NCAP test results* Mercedes-Benz GLE 350d 4MATIC AMG Line (LHD) (2019)
Test	Points	%
Overall:	5 /5 stars	
Adult occupant:	34.9	91%
Child occupant:	44.2	90%
Pedestrian:	37.8	78%
Safety assist:	10.2	78%

==== IIHS ====
The 2020 model year Mercedes-Benz GLE was awarded "Top Safety Pick+" by IIHS, applies to vehicle built after July 2019. The GLE received a good rating in all categories except for the headlights. For the headlights, the available curve-adaptive LED projector headlights with high-beam assist on vehicles built after July 2019 scored a good rating from IIHS.

IIHS scores (2020 model year)
Small overlap front (driver)	Good		
Small overlap front (passenger)	Good		
Moderate overlap front (original test)	Good		
Side impact (original test)	Good		
Roof strength	Good		
Head restraints and seats	Good		
Headlights	Good	Acceptable	
Front crash prevention: vehicle-to-vehicle	Superior		Standard
Front crash prevention: vehicle-to-vehicle	Superior		Optional
Front crash prevention: vehicle-to-pedestrian (day)	Superior		Standard
Front crash prevention: vehicle-to-pedestrian (day)	Basic		Optional
Child restraint LATCH ease of use	Good+		

=== Recall ===
In March 2024, Mercedes-Benz recalled over 116,000 GLE and GLS cars, built from 2019 to 2024, due to a loose 48-volt ground cable that may not have been tightened properly during assembly. The ground cable is located under the front passenger seat that could pose a potential safety risk when the cables become hot.

== Sales ==
Year	Production	U.S.	Mexico	China			
Year	Production	U.S.	Mexico	GLE	Coupe	PHEV	Total
2001		45,655					
2002		39,679					
2003		30,017					
2004		25,681					
2005		34,959					
2006		31,632					
2007		33,879					
2008		34,320					
2009		25,799					
2010		29,698					
2011		35,835	310				
2012		38,101	845				
2013		41,326	783				
2014		46,726	813				
2015		53,217	1,002				
2016		51,791	1,797				
2017		54,595	2,050				
2018		46,010	2,292				
2019		48,664	2,412				
2020		48,153	2,681				
2021		65,073					
2022		57,933					
2023		40,322		40,790	4,239	2,428	47,457
2024				45,380	905	1,254	47,539
2025				34,927	447	360	35,734
