= Mercedes-Benz 320 =

Mercedes-Benz has sold a number of automobiles with the "320" model name:

- 1937—1942 W142
  - 1937—1942 Typ 320
  - 1937—1938 Typ 320N (shorter wheelbase)
- 1993—1995 W124
  - 1993—1995 E320
  - 1994—1995 E320A
- 1993—1998 W140
  - 1993—1998 S320/S320L
- 1994—2001 R129
  - 1994—2001 SL320
- 1995 W210
  - 1995 E320
- 1998 C208
  - 1998 CLK320
- 1998–2005 W163
  - 1998–2005 ML320
- 2000–2011 W203
  - 2000–2007 C320 Sport Coupe
  - 2008–2011 CLC320 Sport Coupe
- 1999—2005 W220
  - 1999—2005 S320/S320 CDI
- 2006—2013 W221
  - 2006—2013 S320/S320 CDI
- 2006–2011 W164
  - 2006–2011 ML320
- 2011–2019 W166
  - 2011–2019 ML320 (GL320 2015–2019)
- 2019–present W167
  - 2019–present GL320

== See also ==
- Mercedes-Benz 320A (1938-42)
