= Mercedes-Benz M142 engine =

Mercedes-Benz M142

Overview
- Manufacturer: Mercedes-Benz
- Production: 1937-1942

Layout
- Configuration: Inline-6
- Displacement: 3.2–3.4 L (195–207 cu in)
- Cylinder bore: 82.5–85 mm (3.2–3.3 in)
- Piston stroke: 100 mm (3.9 in)
- Valvetrain: 12-valve, sidevalve, two-valves per cylinder
- Compression ratio: 5.6:1-6.25:1

Combustion
- Fuel system: Carburetor
- Fuel type: Gasoline
- Oil system: Dry sump

Output
- Power output: 77–79 hp (57–59 kW)
- Torque output: 161 lb⋅ft (218 N⋅m)

The Mercedes-Benz M142 engine is a naturally-aspirated, 3.2-liter to 3.4-liter, straight-6, internal combustion piston engine, designed, developed and produced by Mercedes-Benz; between 1937 and 1942.

== Applications ==
- Mercedes-Benz W142
- Mercedes-Benz 320A
