= Mercedes-Benz W18 =

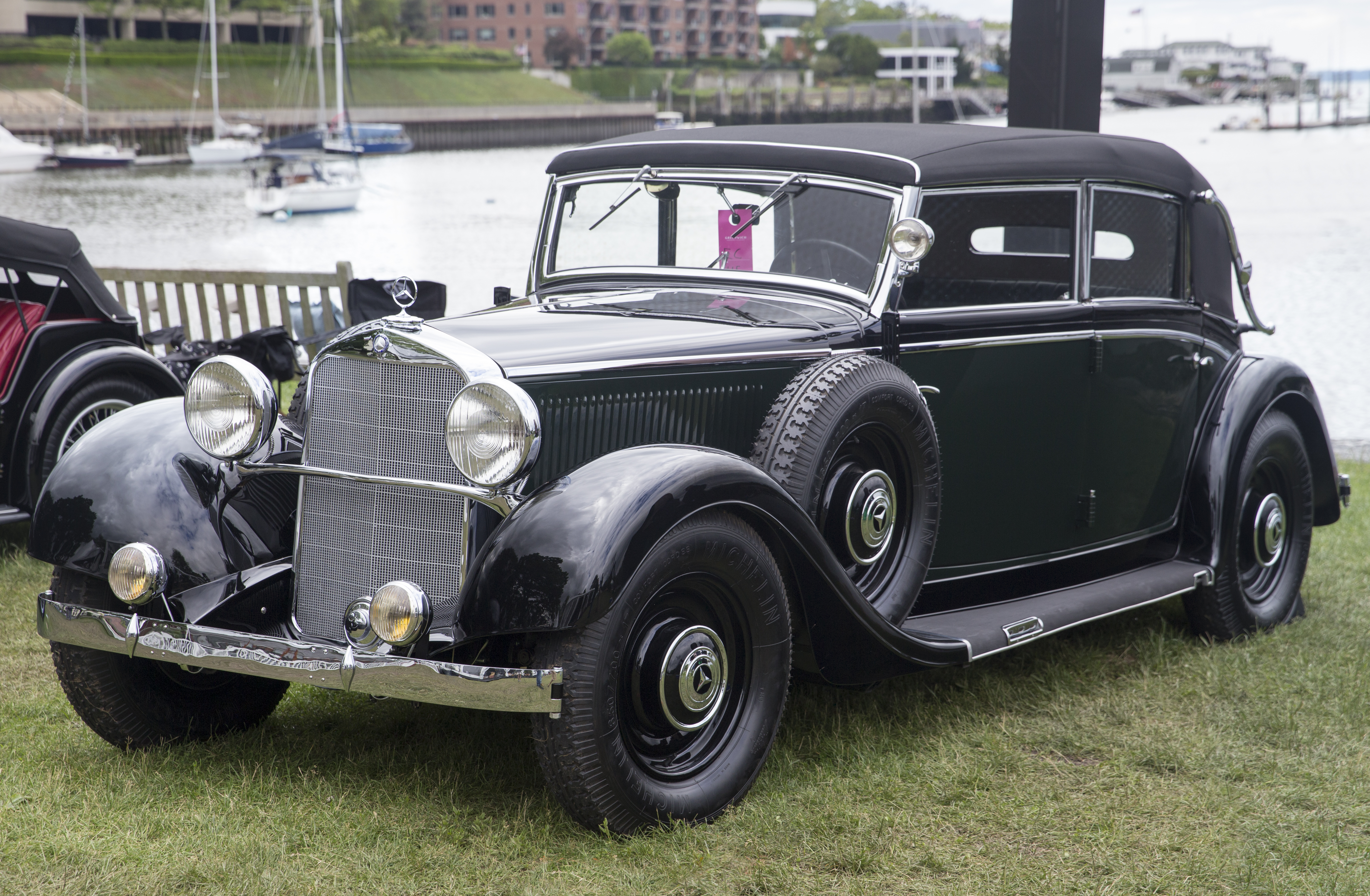
- Mercedes-Benz 290 Cabriolet D (1935)

Overview
- Manufacturer: Mercedes-Benz
- Also called: Mercedes-Benz Typ 290
- Production: 1933–1937; 7,495 units
- Assembly: Germany: Stuttgart

Body and chassis
- Class: Luxury car
- Body style: Shorter chassis 1933–1937: 4-door "Limousine" (sedan/saloon) with 6 side windows Torpedo-bodied 4-door “Tourenwagen” 2 & 4-door Cabriolets (various) Longer chassis 1934–1937: 4-door "Limousine" (sedan/saloon) with 4 side windows 4-door 6-seater "Pullman-Limousine" (sedan/saloon) with 6 side windows Torpedo-bodied 4-door 6-seater “Tourenwagen” 2 & 4-door Cabriolets (various); Roadster (from 1936)
- Layout: FR layout

Powertrain
- Engine: 2,867 cc M18 I6

Dimensions
- Wheelbase: 2,880 mm (113 in) or 3,300 mm (130 in)
- Length: 4,370 mm (172 in) or 4,870 mm (192 in)
- Width: 1,730 mm (68 in)
- Height: 1,440 mm (57 in) - 1,660 mm (65 in)

Chronology
- Predecessor: Mercedes-Benz W10
- Successor: Mercedes-Benz W142; Mercedes-Benz 320A

The Mercedes-Benz W18 was a six-cylinder automobile sold as the Mercedes-Benz Typ 290. Introduced in 1933, it was a smaller-engined successor to the manufacturer's Typ 350 / 370 Mannheim model. In terms of the German auto-business of the 1930s it occupied a market position roughly equivalent to that filled by the Mercedes-Benz E-Class in the closing decades of the twentieth century. The W18 was replaced in 1937 by the manufacturer’s W142 (Typ 320).

Several different models with names incorporating the number "290" were produced by Mercedes-Benz during the 1930s (and later), so to avoid ambiguity the car is frequently identified by the manufacturer's model code, "W18".

== Engine and running gear ==
The six-cylinder 2,867 cc side-valve engine produced a maximum output of 60 PS (44 kW; 59 hp) at 3,200 rpm. In 1935 the compression ratio was increased along with maximum power which was now given as 68 PS (50 kW; 67 hp). Power was delivered to the rear wheels via a four-speed manual transmission with synchromesh on the top two ratios. On standard-bodied cars, the 1:1 ratio was achieved with third gear, leaving the fourth ratio as an overdrive ratio. The rear wheels were attached to a swing axle while at the front a lateral leaf spring was complemented by a pair of coil springs. The footbrake applied stopping power to all four wheels via a hydraulic control mechanism.

== Short chassis (1933–1937) ==
The shorter cars sat on a 2,880 mm (113.4 in) wheelbase. The bodies closely resembled those fitted on the Typ 200 (W21) models of the same period, although the bodies fitted on the Typ 290s were actually a little larger. A car fitted with the least expensive of the standard W18 bodies, which was a four-seat, six-light Limousine (saloon), was listed by the manufacturer at 7,950 Marks. A four-door Torpedo-bodied 4-door Tourenwagen was priced at 9,500 Marks, and there were also, from the start, no fewer than three different standard cabriolet bodies with two or four doors and between two and four seats, designated Cabriolet B, Cabriolet C, and Cabriolet D. In 1936 these were joined by the fourth, more sporting Cabriolet A, which was 190 mm (7.5 in) lower than the other standard-bodied cars.

The manufacturer also made the W18 available in bare chassis form for customers preferring to specify a bespoke body from an independent coachbuilder. In addition a significant number of quasi-Jeep military Kübelwagen were produced based on the same chassis and mechanical components.

== Long chassis (1934–1937) ==
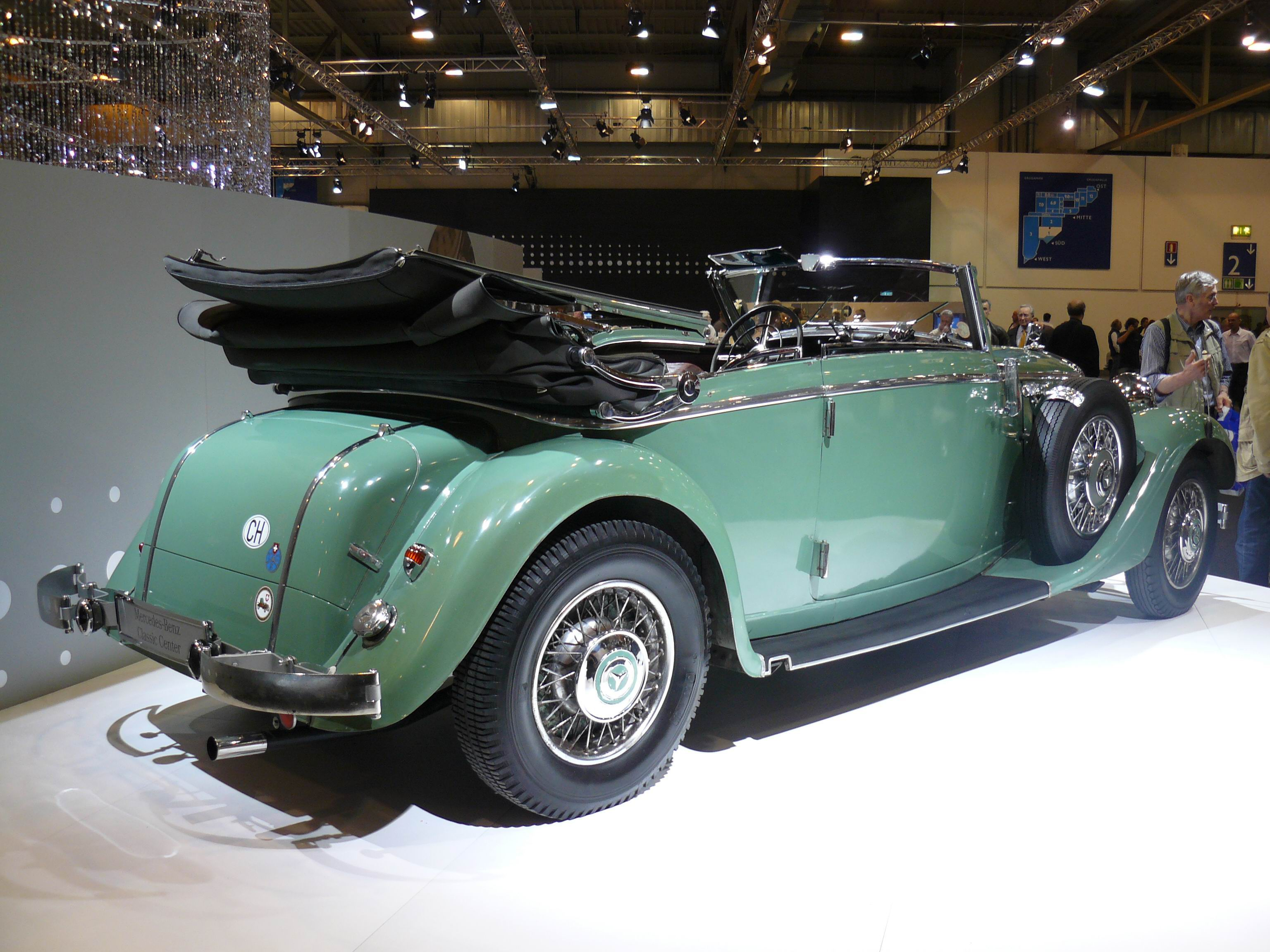
Mercedes Benz W18 1935.

A year after the appearance of the shorter-bodied car, a longer 3,300 mm (129.9 in) wheelbase became available. All the body types offered for the shorter car were now also offered for the longer one. In addition there was a six-seater "Pullman-Limousine" and a cabriolet version of the six-seater-bodied car designated the Cabriolet F. A more rakish, "Roadster" cabriolet was added in 1936.

Long chassis cars came with different transmission ratios whereby the 1:1 ratio matched fourth gear and there was no overdrive. The final drive ratio was also raised for the longer cars.

== Commercial ==
Mercedes-Benz produced 7,495 W18 passenger cars, of which 3,566 sat on the shorter chassis while 3,929 used the longer chassis. The German auto-market in the middle 1930s absorbed roughly 200,000 passenger cars annually. In its strongest years (1934 and 1935) the W18 was selling at the rate of approximately 2,000 cars annually implying a market share of very roughly 1%.

In addition to the cars, 719 quasi-Jeep military W18 Kübelwagen were produced.
