= Mercedes-Benz W142 =

Mercedes-Benz W 142
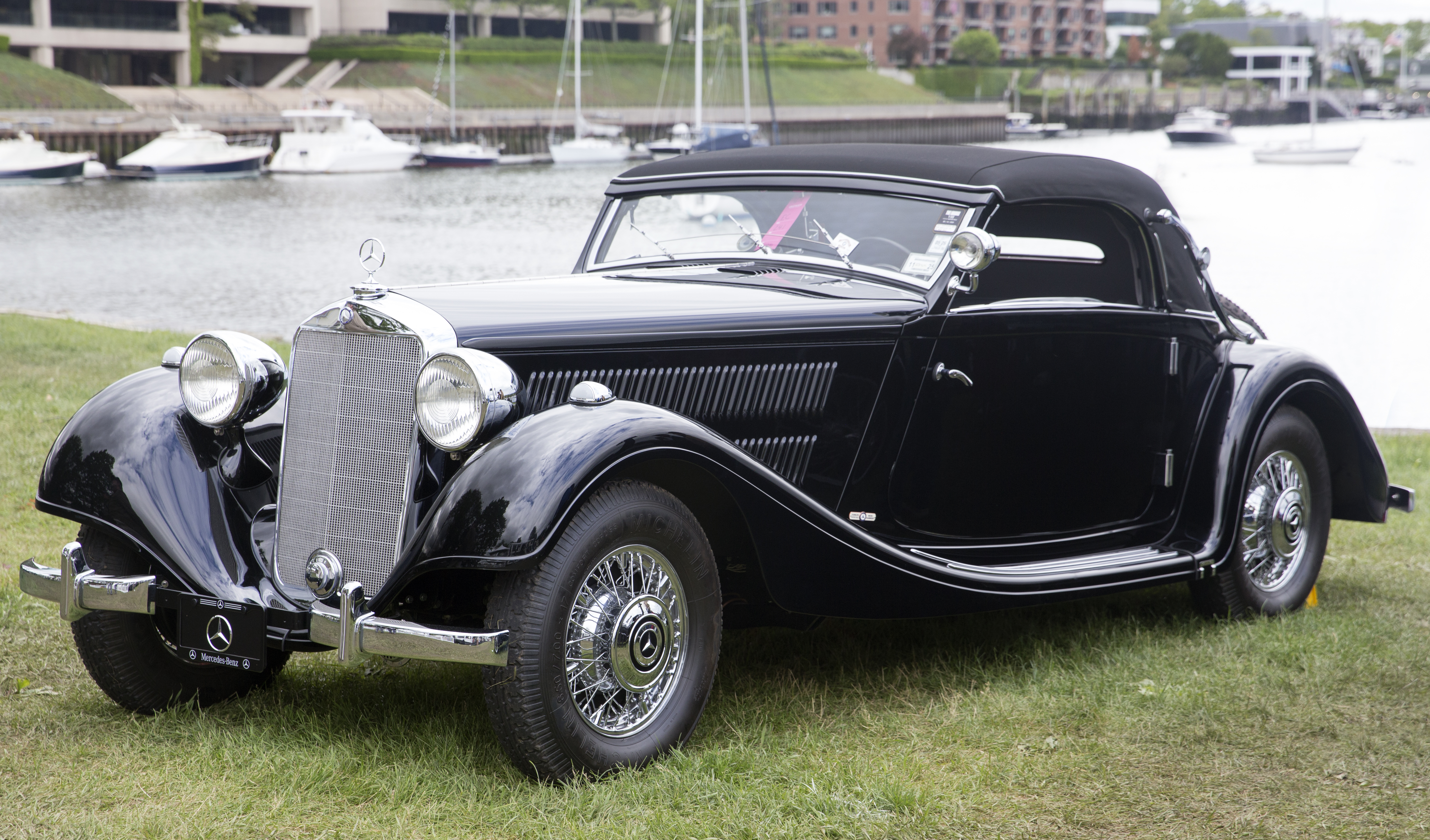
- Mercedes-Benz 320 Cabriolet A SWB (W142/1; 1937)

Overview
- Manufacturer: Mercedes-Benz
- Also called: Mercedes-Benz Typ 320
- Production: 1937–1942; 7,017 units
- Assembly: Germany: Stuttgart

Body and chassis
- Class: Large luxury car
- Body style: 320 N (short wheelbase): 3-seater Cabriolet; Coupé with removable roof; 320 (regular wheelbase): 4-door Limousine (saloon); 4-door Pullman-Limousine ("six-light" saloon/sedan); Torpedo-bodied 6-seater Tourenwagen; 2/4-door Cabriolets (various); 4-door 6-seater Pullman-Cabriolet; 2-door Roadster; 4-door Stromlinien-Lmousine (streamlined saloon)
- Layout: FR layout

Powertrain
- Engine: 1937–1938: 3,208 cc M142 I6; 1938–1942: 3,405 cc M142 II I6

Dimensions
- Wheelbase: 2,880 mm (113.4 in) (320 N/WK); 3,300 mm (129.9 in) (320)
- Length: 4,700–5,250 mm (185.0–206.7 in)
- Width: 1,630 mm (64.2 in)
- Height: 1,580 mm (62.2 in)

Chronology
- Predecessor: Mercedes-Benz W18
- Successor: Mercedes-Benz W187

The Mercedes-Benz W 142 (Mercedes-Benz Typ 320) was a six-cylinder passenger car launched in February 1937, as a successor to the Mercedes-Benz Typ 290 (Mercedes-Benz W 18). The car was known by its name Typ 320 at the time of its production and service, but is in retrospect commonly referred to using its Mercedes-Benz works number, "W142," which gives a more unambiguous, unique nomenclature.

== W142/I: 1937–1938 ==
The standard-wheelbase version of the W142 shared its 2,880 mm (113 in) wheelbase with the standard versions of its predecessor, but a more streamlined form with longer overhangs meant that even in this form the W142 was substantially longer and indeed wider than the earlier car. The front grille was gently raked backwards, and there was no longer a bar in front of it to carry lights, all of which gave the car a more sporting look than the model it replaced.

Power came from a newly enlarged, 3,208 cc side-valve, straight-six engine with a listed maximum output of 78 PS (57 kW; 77 hp) at 4,000 rpm, supporting a claimed top speed of 130 km/h (81 mph). This was delivered to the rear wheels via a four-speed manual transmission which, unusually in the 1930s, incorporated synchromesh on all four ratios. The footbrake used a hydraulic control mechanism and operated on all four wheels. The suspension set-up was carried over from the W18 with a swing axle at the rear and the front axle suspended with a central transverse leaf spring and coil springs beside the wheels.

Customers wishing to make their own arrangements in respect of bodywork could buy a standard-wheelbase W142 in base chassis form at the manufacturer's listed price of 6,500 Marks. Otherwise the choice of standard bodies was restricted to a three-seat cabriolet (known as the "Cabriolet A") or a coupé-bodied equivalent with a removable roof, priced respectively at 11,800 Marks or 12,300 Marks.

== W142/II: 1937–1938 ==
Longer-bodied cars came with an extra 420 mm (16.5 in) of wheelbase, and Mercedes-Benz offered a choice from a wide range of standard body options for the longer cars.

Customers happy to make their own arrangements in respect of bodywork could buy a longer-wheelbase W142 in base chassis form at the manufacturer's listed price of 6,800 Marks, or 300 Marks more than the price of the shorter chassis. The entry-level model with a Mercedes-Benz body included in the price was the four-door ”Limousine” (sedan/saloon) at 8,950 Marks. There were no fewer than four cabriolet-bodied versions of the longer-wheelbase car offered, being a two-door 2/3-seater ("Cabriolet A"), a two-door 4-seater with four side-windows ("Cabriolet B"), a four-door 4-seater ("Cabriolet D") and a very substantial-looking four-door 6-seater with three rows of seats ("Pullman-Cabriolet F"). Other soft-topped standard-bodied versions were a Torpedo-bodied 6-seater "Tourenwagen" and a sporty 2-seater Roadster. There was also a six-seater “Pullman-Limousine” with three rows of seats and six side windows under a conventional steel roof. The rear seat of the Pullman-bodied cars was above the back axle, and an extra luggage locker at the back left the overall length of the Pullman-Limousine at 5,250 mm (206.7 in), still using the 3,300 mm (129.9 in) wheelbase. The highest listed price for a Mercedes-Benz-bodied W142 was 14,500 Marks for a "Stromlinien-Limousine," featuring a strikingly modern, streamlined steel body.

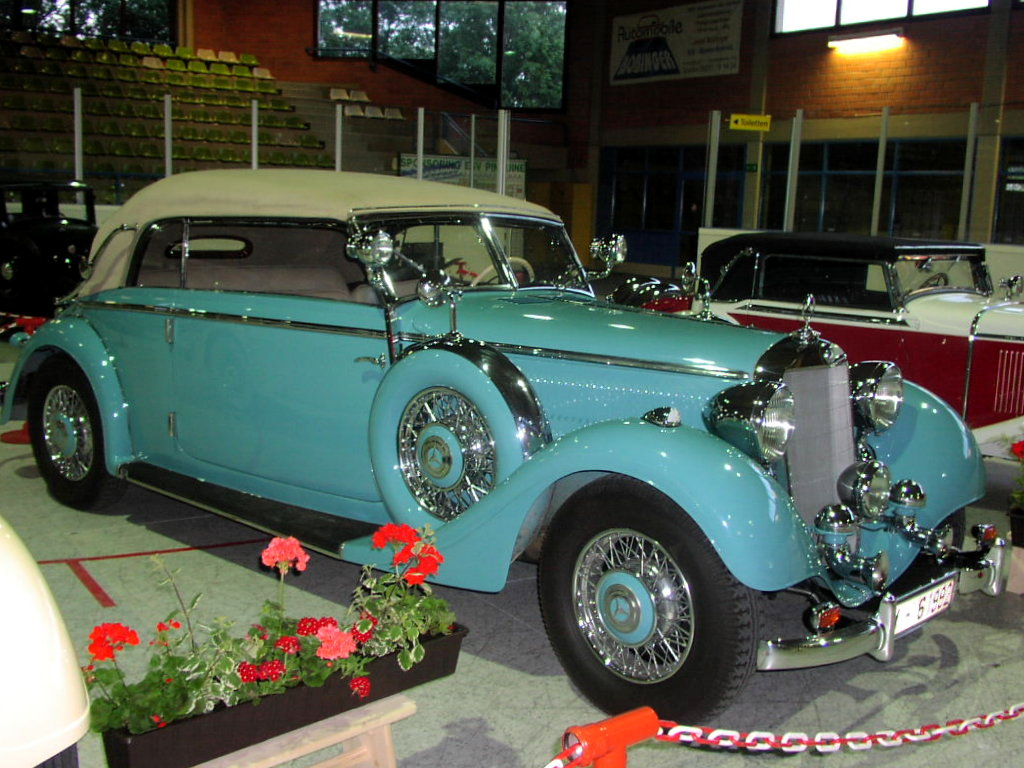
Mercedes-Benz 320 2-door Cabriolet B (W142/II longer-wheelbase; 1938)

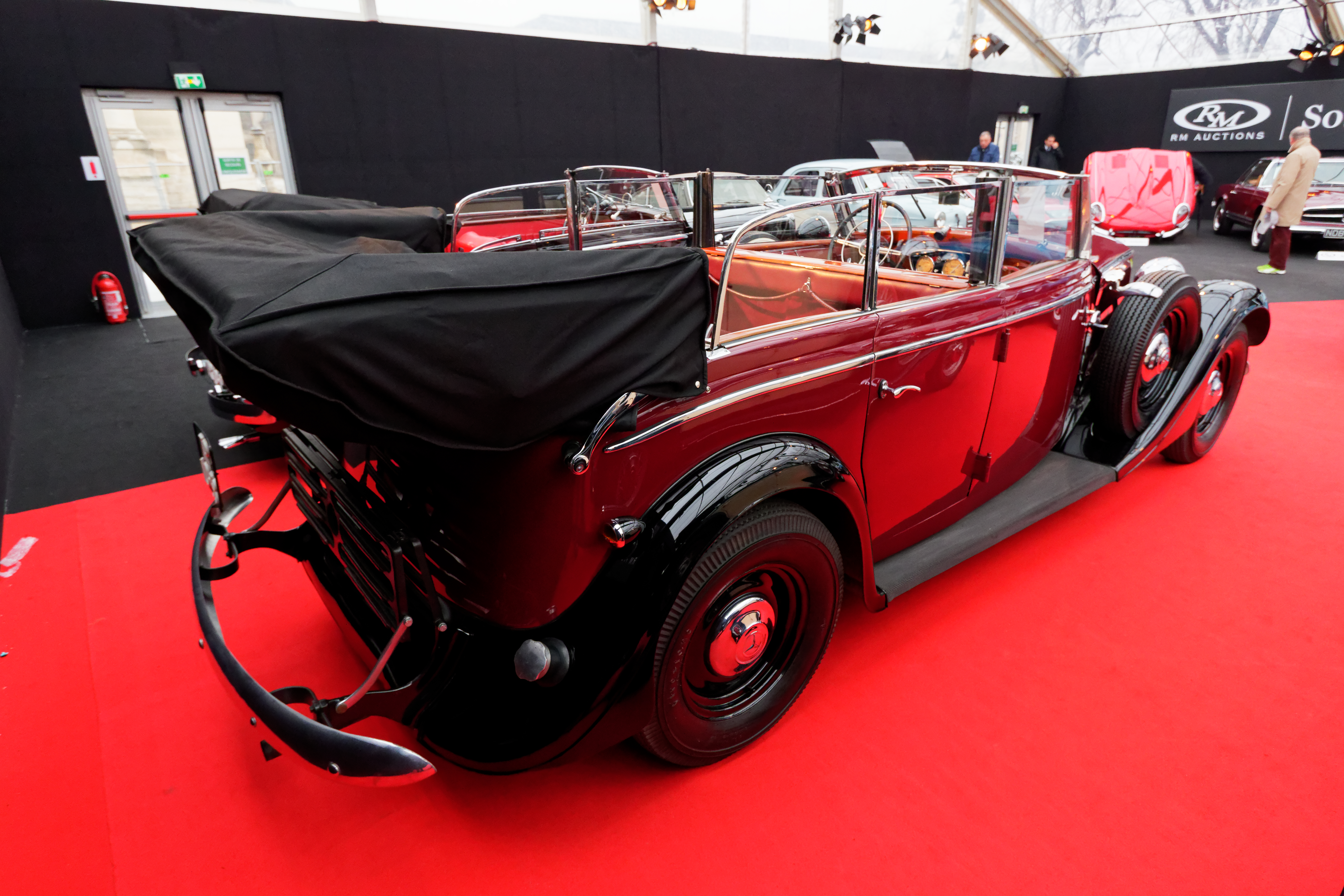
Mercedes-Benz 320 4-door Pullman Cabriolet F (W142/II; 1942)

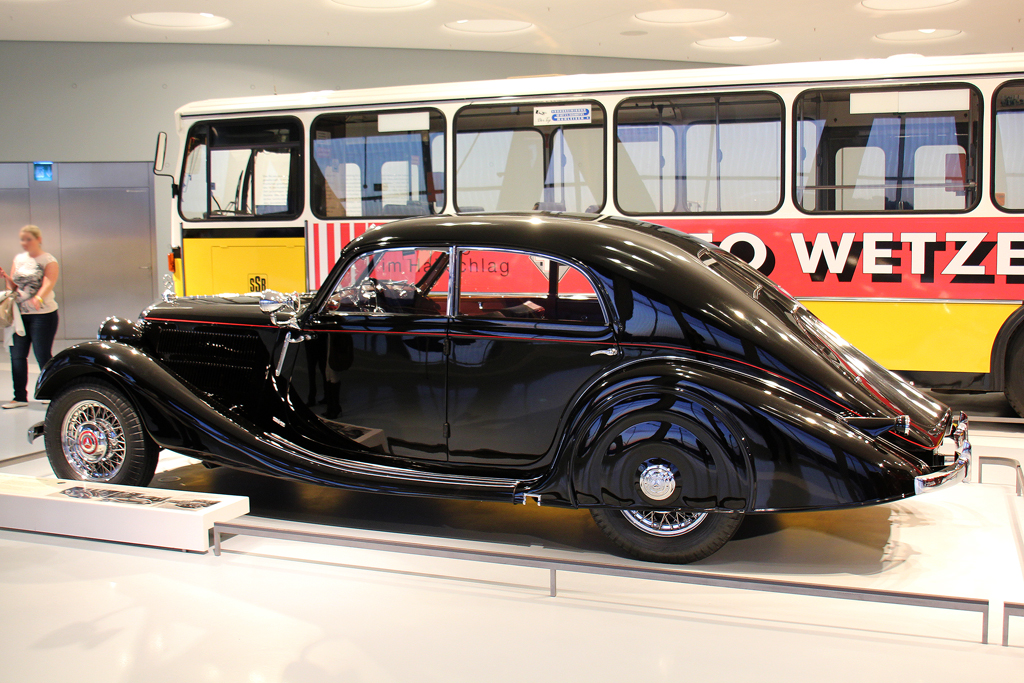
Mercedes-Benz 320 Stromlinien-Limousine (W142/II; 1939)

== W142/III: 1937–1939 ==
The short-wheelbase version of the car was also the basis for the 320 WK, a Wehrmachtskübelwagen ("military vehicle"), one of several such vehicles which may have provided inspiration for the subsequent (1941) Jeep. The W142 “Kübelwagen” retained the frontal style of the car on which it was based, but with a horizontal bar ahead of the front grille on which to mount lights. It had four front-hinged doors, a canvas top and wide-tread tyres for rough terrain. In this form the vehicle came with a listed top speed of 118 km/h (73 mph).

== W142/IV: 1938–1942 ==
In 1938 the manufacturer increased the cylinder bore to 85 mm (3.35 in), thereby increasing the engine capacity to 3,405 cc. Nevertheless, the cars retained the "Typ 320" designation. There was also no change in the power output, still listed at 78 PS (57 kW; 77 hp) at 4,000 rpm, and there were no claims of improved performance. Instead the compression ratio was lowered in anticipation of future shortages enforcing the use of fuel synthesized from coal which was expected to have a lower octane rating than the “normal” fuel used at the time. The larger-engined car also came with an overdrive ratio (1 : 0.73) added to the hitherto four-speed gear box which the car had featured since launch.

In 1939 the larger engine was also used in the W142/III Kübelwagen, this time accompanied by a small increase in maximum output to 80 PS (59 kW; 79 hp) and an accompanying reassurance that the top speed was undiminished.

== Commercial ==
Between 1937 and 1942 Mercedes-Benz produced 4,326 of the 3,208 cc cars and 885 of the 3,405 cc cars.

Production of a further 1,806 W142 based military Kübelwagen between 1938 and 1940 is also recorded.
