= Mercedes-Benz C-Class (W203) =

Second generation of Mercedes-Benz C-Class

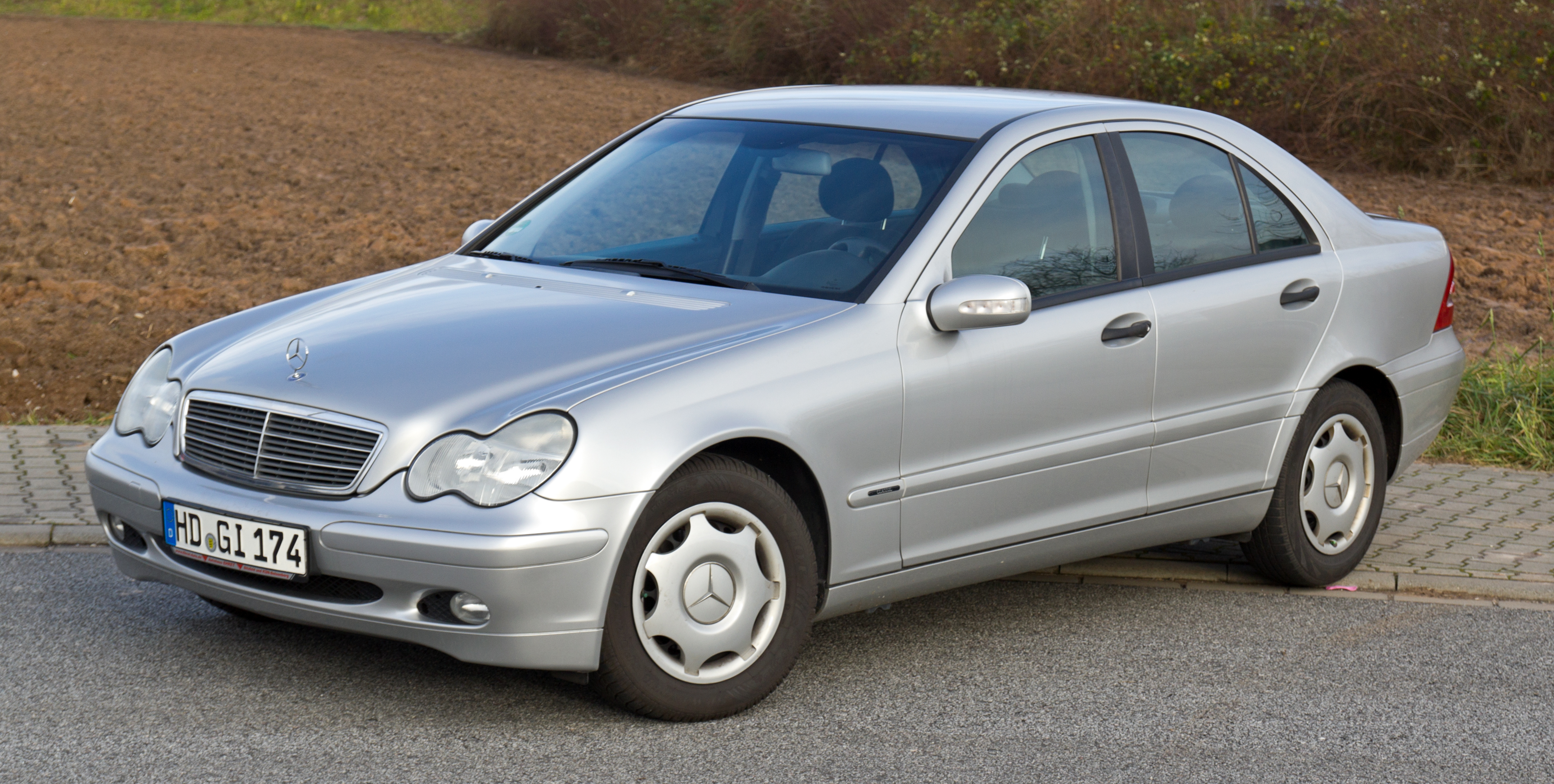

Overview
- Manufacturer: DaimlerChrysler (1999–2007); Daimler AG (2007–2010)
- Model code: W203 (saloon); S203 (station wagon / estate); CL203 (coupé)
- Also called: Mercedes-Benz CLC-Class (coupe, 2008–2011)
- Production: March 1999 – March 2007 (sedan); April 2000 – June 2007 (station wagon); August 1999 – December 2010 (coupe)
- Model years: 2001–2007
- Assembly: Germany: Bremen, Sindelfingen; Brazil: Juiz de Fora; India: Pune (MBI: CKD); Malaysia: Pekan (HICOM: CKD); South Africa: East London; Thailand: Samut Prakan (CKD); Vietnam: Ho Chi Minh City (MBV: CKD); Indonesia: Wanaherang, Bogor (MBDI: CKD)
- Designer: Hartmut Sinkwitz

Body and chassis
- Class: Compact executive car (D)
- Body style: 4-door sedan 5-door station wagon 3-door hatchback coupé (SportCoupé/CLC)
- Layout: Front-engine, rear-wheel-drive or all-wheel-drive (4Matic)
- Related: Mercedes-Benz CLK-Class (C209)

Powertrain
- Engine: Petrol: 1.8 L M271 Kompressor supercharged I4 DOHC 16v; 2.0 L M111 I4 DOHC 16v; 2.0 L M111 Kompressor supercharged I4 DOHC 16v; 2.6 L M112 SOHC V6 18v; 2.5 L M272 V6 DOHC 24v; 3.2 L M112 SOHC V6 18v; 3.2 L M112 AMG Kompressor supercharged V6 SOHC 18v; 3.5 L M272 V6 DOHC 24v; 5.4 L M113 AMG V8 SOHC 24v; Diesel: 2.1 L OM611 CDI I4 DOHC 16v (turbo); 2.1 L OM646 CDI I4 DOHC 16v (turbo); 2.7–3.0 L OM612 CDI I5 DOHC 20v (turbo); 3.0 L OM642 CDI V6 24v (turbo)
- Transmission: 6-speed manual; 6-speed Sequentronic automated manual; 5-speed 5G-Tronic automatic; 7-speed 7G-Tronic automatic

Dimensions
- Wheelbase: 2,715 mm (106.9 in)
- Length: Sedan: 4,526 mm (178.2 in), 4,611 mm (181.5 in) (C 55 AMG); Wagon: 4,541 mm (178.8 in), 4,626 mm (182.1 in) (C 55 AMG); SportCoupe: 4,343 mm (171.0 in)
- Width: 1,728 mm (68.0 in)
- Height: Sedan: 1,426 mm (56.1 in); Wagon: 1,465 mm (57.7 in); Coupe: 1,406 mm (55.4 in)

Chronology
- Predecessor: Mercedes-Benz C-Class (W202)
- Successor: Mercedes-Benz C-Class (W204); Mercedes-Benz C-Class (C204) (for CLC-Class)

The Mercedes-Benz C-Class (W203) is the internal designation for a range of compact executive cars manufactured and marketed by DaimlerChrysler from 1999 to 2010, as the second generation of the C-Class — in sedan/saloon, three-door hatchback coupé (marketed as the SportCoupé and sub-designated CL203) and station wagon/estate (sub-designated S203) body styles.

== Design and development ==
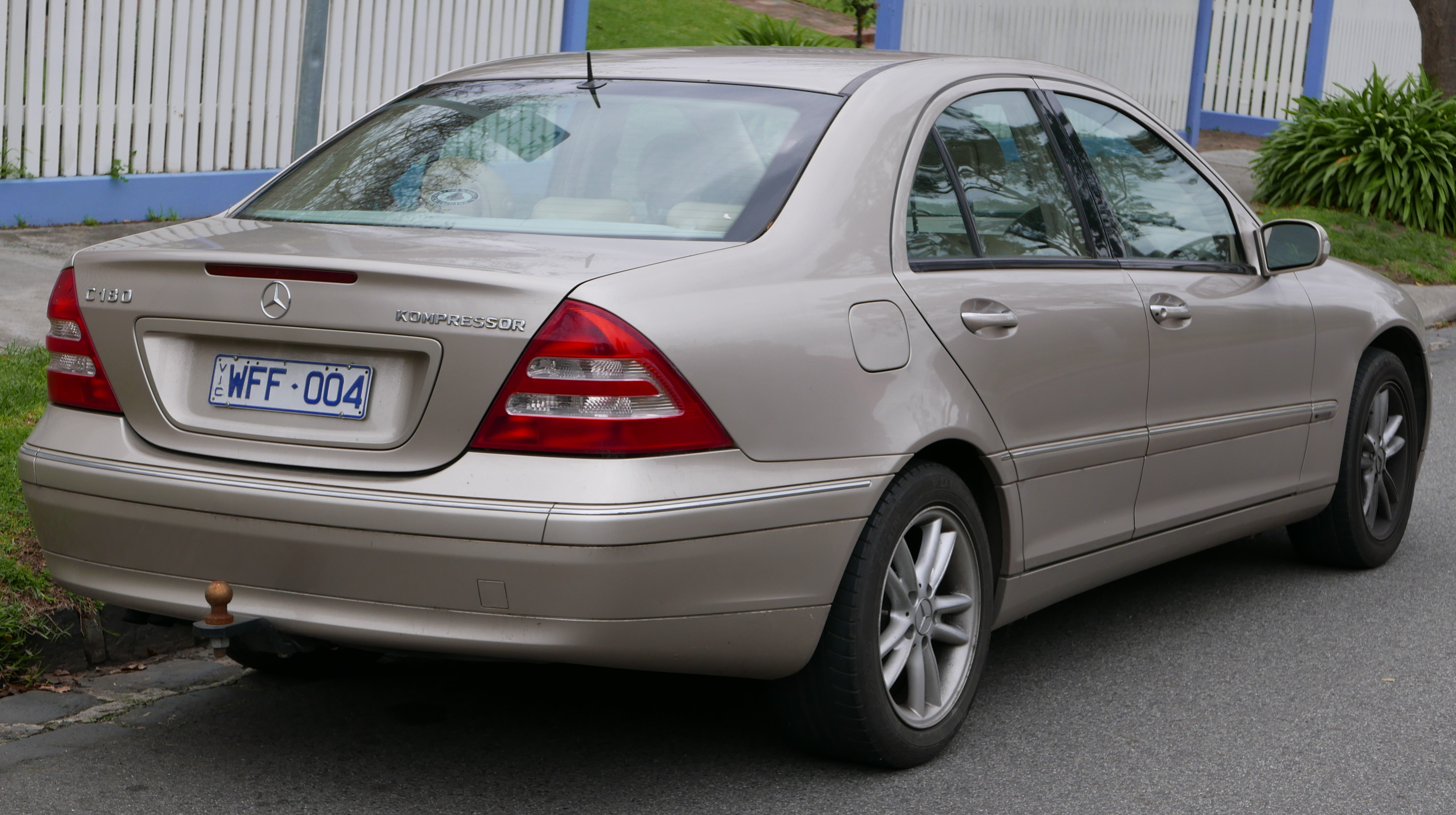
Sedan (pre-facelift)

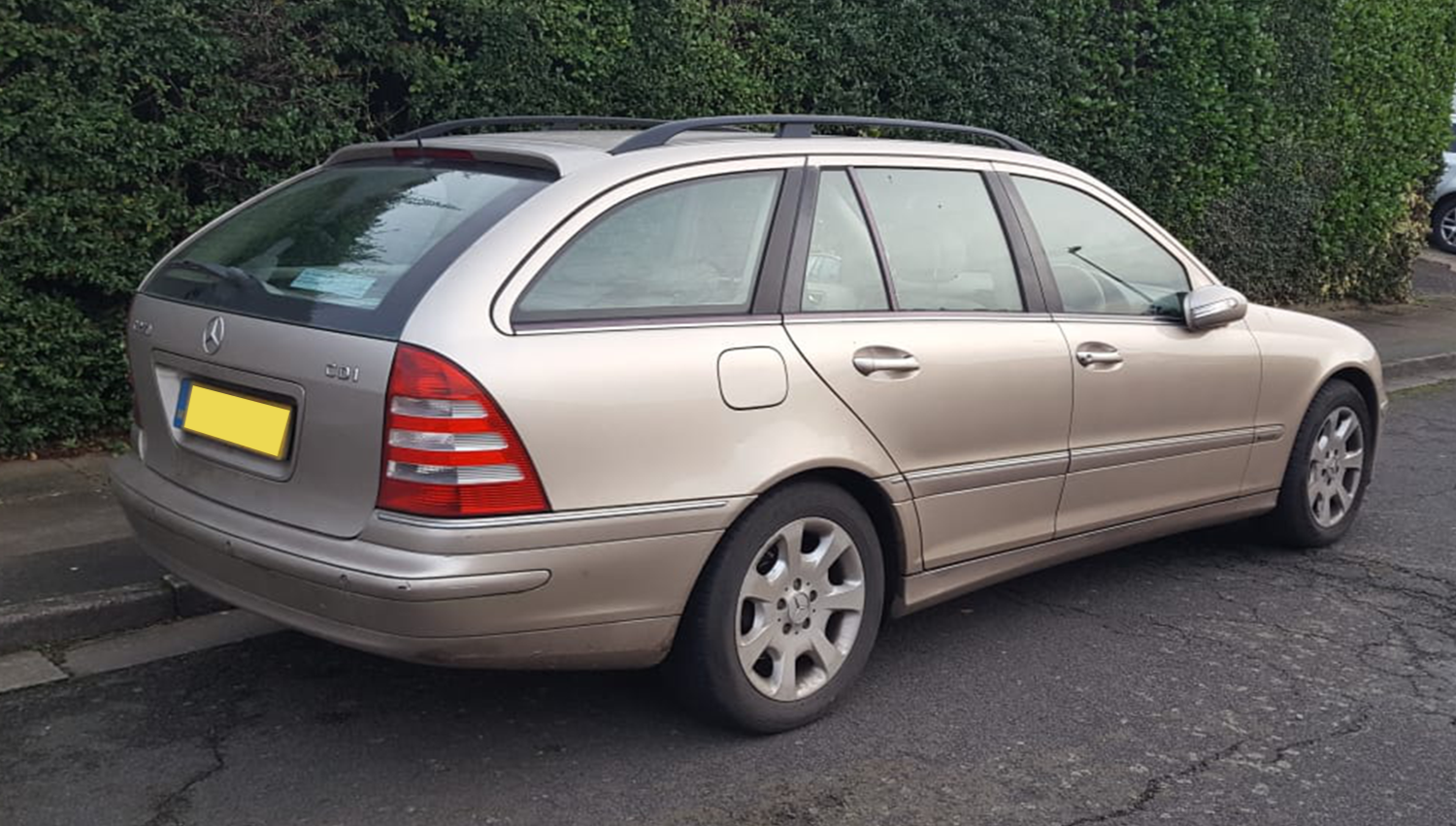
Wagon (pre-facelift)

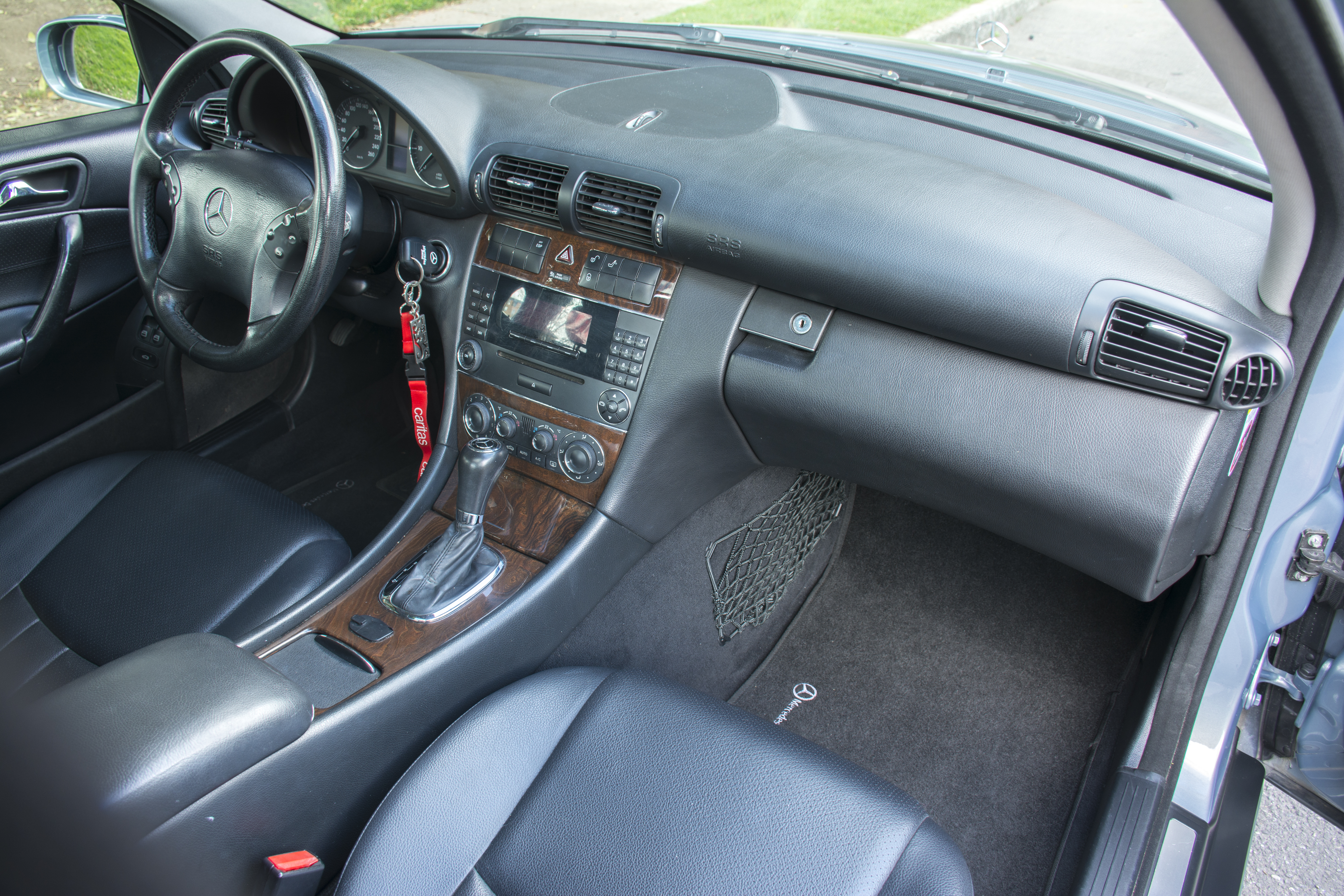
Interior (facelift)

Design work on the W203 C-Class began in mid-1994, with the final design approved in December 1995 by the executive board. Design patents were filed on 20 April 1998 and 4 March 1999. Testing began in 1997, with development concluding in 2000. The second generation C-Class was presented on March 21, 2000 and went on sale starting in September 2000. The sedan debuted with a range of inline-four and V6 petrol engines and inline-four and -five diesels. Most of the engines were carried over from the W202, but the C 320 was exclusive, offering 160 kW (218 PS). The diesels now featured common rail direct fuel injection and variable geometry turbochargers. Six-speed manual gearboxes were now standard for the entire range, except the C 320. There was a version of this car that was made in Korea.

Mercedes-Benz presented a coupe variant in October 2000 (launching in 2001), labelled the C-Class SportCoupé and given the internal designation CL203 (see below). The US model, labeled C 230 Kompressor, became available for the 2002 model year with the M111.981 engine, a 2.3 -litre supercharged inline-four making 145 kW (194 hp) at 5500 rpm and 280 N⋅m (210 lb⋅ft) at 2500–4800 rpm. The third body variant, a station wagon codenamed S203 arrived in 2001. Then in 2002 for the 2003 model year, a new family of supercharged four cylinder engines, dubbed M271, debuted for the entire C-Class range. All of them used the same 1.8-litre engine, with different designations according to horsepower levels, including a version powered by natural gas. The C 230 Kompressor variant sported 141 kW (189 hp). The newer 1.8-litre was less powerful but smoother and more efficient than the older 2.3-litre engine (143 kW (194 PS) compared to 140 kW (190 PS). For the C 240 and C 320, 4MATIC four-wheel drive versions were also offered in addition to rear-wheel drive.

Along with the C-Class Estate (wagon), the SportCoupé was discontinued in Canada and the United States after the 2005 model year. The SportCoupé continued on sale in other markets until 2008. From October 2000 until 2007, a total of 230,000 SportCoupé were built in the Bremen factory and in Brazil.

As of 20 September 2006, over two million C-Class vehicles (including sedan, station wagon and SportCoupé) had been sold since March 2000, with 1.4 million sedans since May 2000, 330,000 wagons since spring 2001, and 283,000 of SportCoupé since spring 2001. Over 30 percent of total sales occurred in Germany, and over 20 percent in the United States. The last W203 C-Class sedan was produced on 14 December 2006 at the Sindelfingen plant, although US-market sedans were made as late as March 2007.

=== Facelift ===
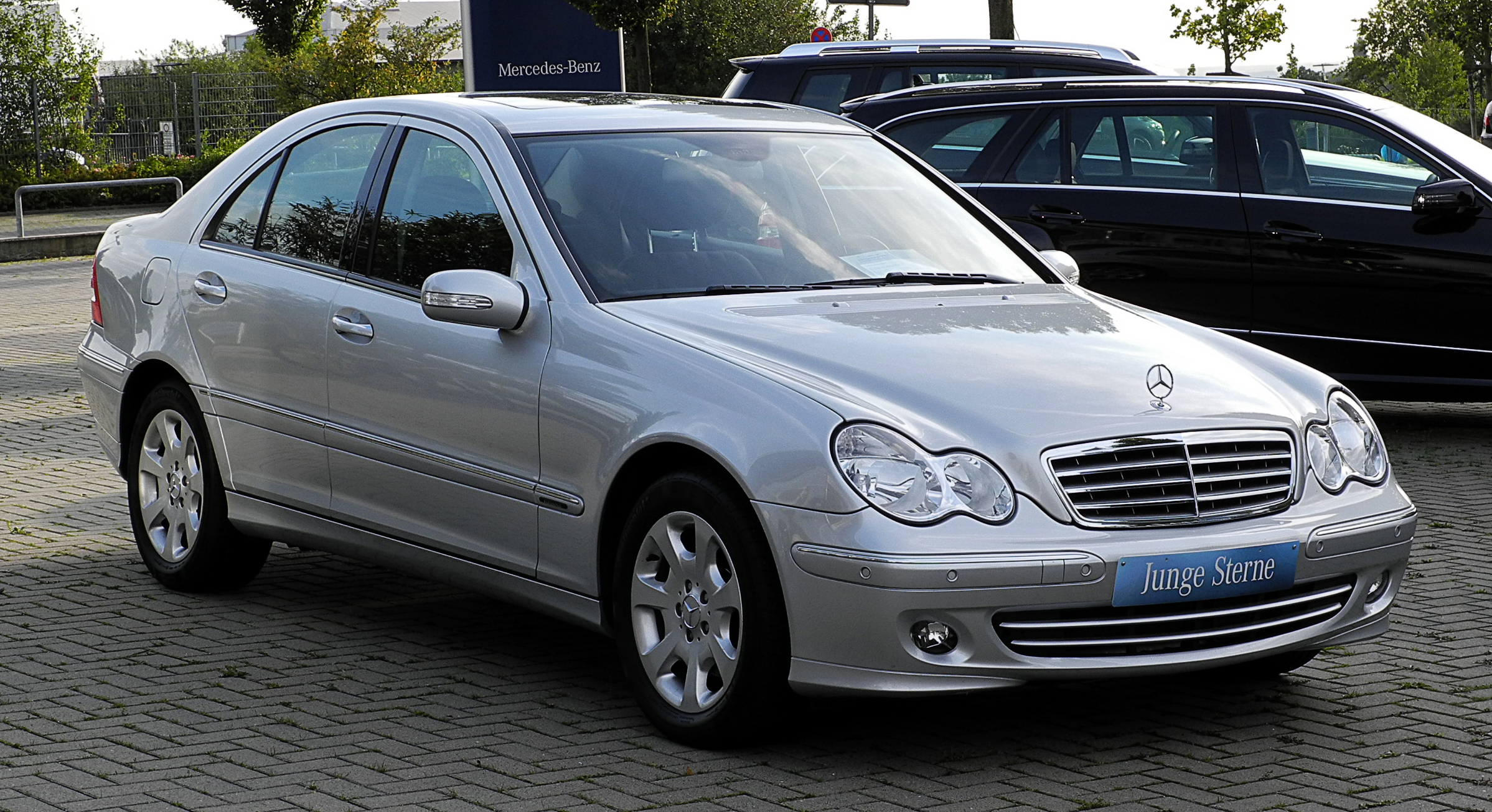

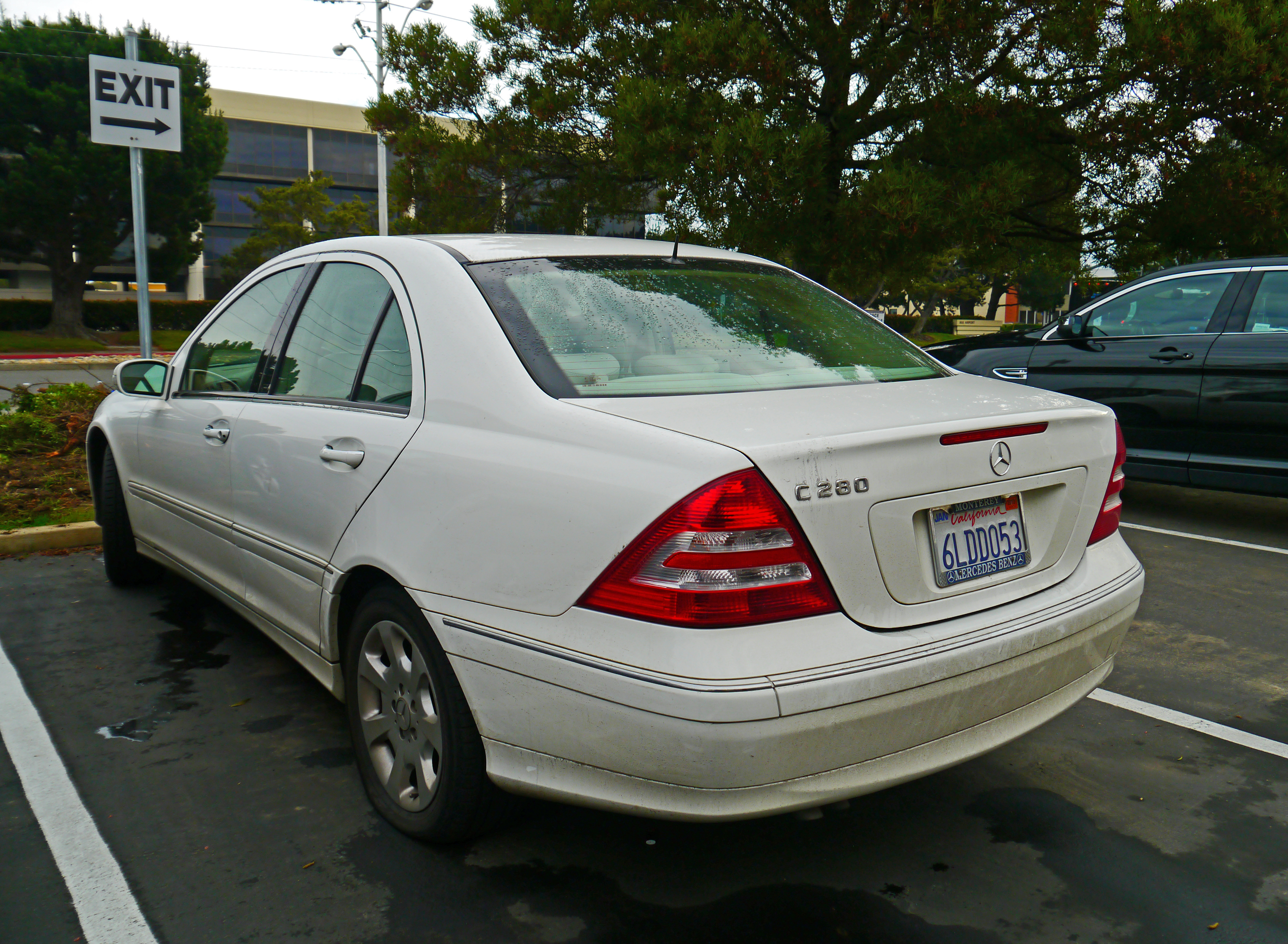
Sedan (facelift)

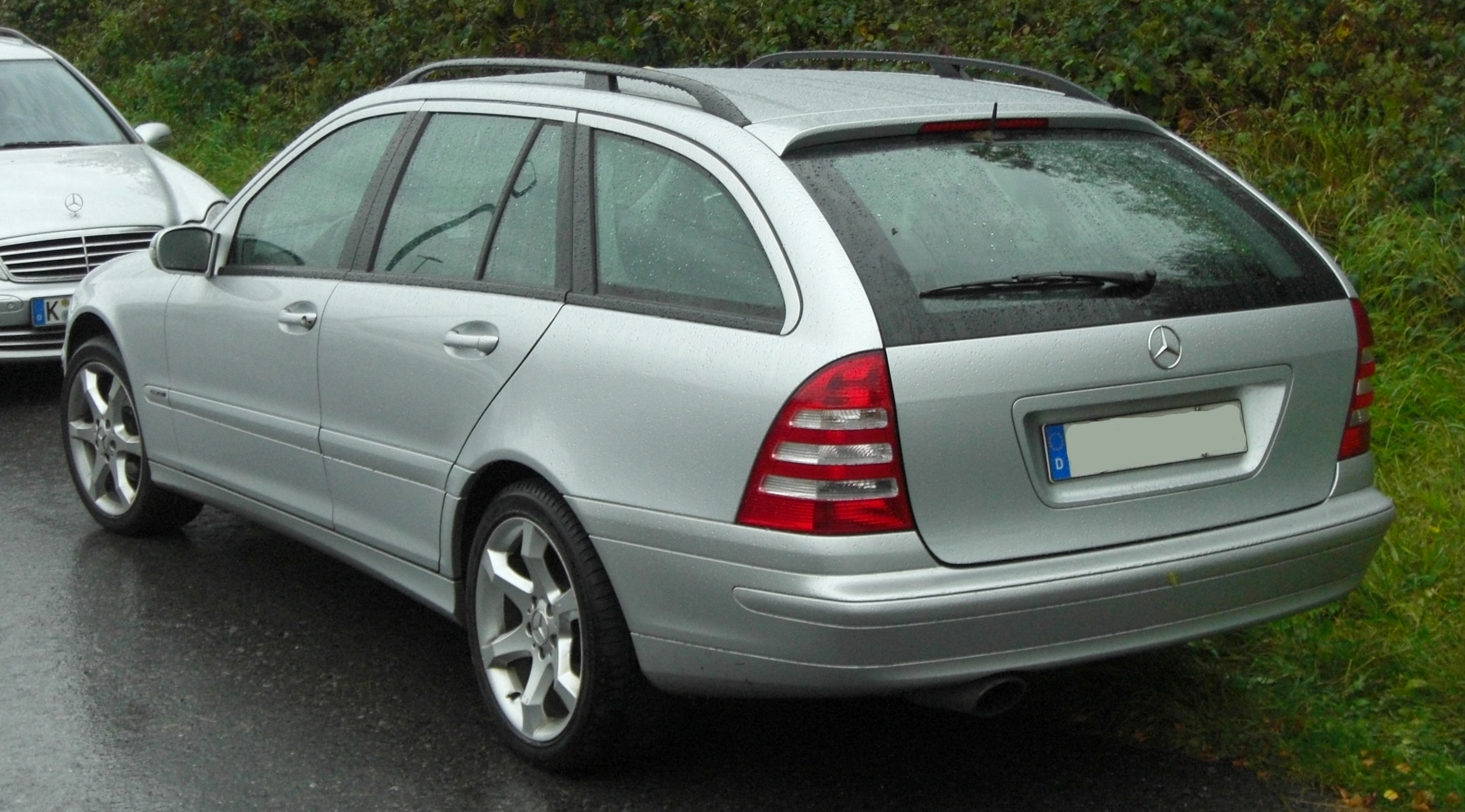
Wagon (facelift)

The C-Class W203 was refreshed in early 2004. In North America, the refresh took effect for the 2005 model year. The interior styling was changed in all three body styles. The instrument cluster was revised to display four chrome gauges with multifunction display in the middle. Centre console revision with new radio and climate control designs were also included. A fully integrated iPod connection kit was available as was a better Bluetooth phone system made optional. For the North American market C230, the "sport" package was made standard which included AMG edition bumpers, side skirts, and a rear spoiler. The exterior had changes of different wheel designs, grills and clear lens headlights. New more aggressive front, rear bumpers and side skirting were also installed.

Several all-new M272 and the OM642 V6 engines were introduced later in the year. In North America, the changes took effect for the 2006 model year. The C230, C280, C350 replaced the C240 and C320, the new-generation six-cylinder engines developed substantially more power than the older versions, by as much as 24 percent, whilst also increasing fuel economy and reducing CO_{2} emissions. The C230, C280 and C350 developed 150 kW (204 PS), 170 kW (231 PS) and 200 kW (272 PS) respectively. The three-valve twin spark design was replaced by a four-valve design, now with variable valve timing. On the diesel side, Mercedes-Benz released a brand-new 3.0-litre V6. Fitted to the 320 CDI, the new diesel cut CO_{2} emissions and fuel consumption over the old C270 CDI. The C220 CDI received a power increase from 105 to 110 kW (143 to 150 PS). In addition, the V6 engines also received the new seven-speed 7G-Tronic automatic transmission.

== Engines ==
Petrol engines
Models	Production years	Displacement	Power	Torque	Acceleration (0–100 km/h, automatic)	Top speed (automatic)	Fuel consumption (combined, automatic)
Inline-4 engines
C 160 (SportCoupé)	2005–2006	1,796 cc (109.6 cu in)	122 PS (90 kW; 120 hp) at 5,200 rpm	190 N⋅m (140 lbf⋅ft) at 1,500–4,200 rpm	11.9 seconds	202 km/h (126 mph)	8.2–8.5 L/100 km (34–33 mpg_{‑imp}; 29–28 mpg_{‑US})
C 180	2000–2002	1,998 cc (121.9 cu in)	129 PS (95 kW; 127 hp) at 5,300 rpm	190 N⋅m (140 lbf⋅ft) at 4,000 rpm	11 seconds	210 km/h (130 mph)	9.4 L/100 km (30 mpg_{‑imp}; 25 mpg_{‑US})
C 180 Kompressor	2002–2007	1,796 cc (109.6 cu in) Supercharged	143 PS (105 kW; 141 hp) at 5,200 rpm	220 N⋅m (162 lbf⋅ft) at 2,500-4,200 rpm	9.9 seconds	220 km/h (137 mph)	8.2–8.5 L/100 km (34–33 mpg_{‑imp}; 29–28 mpg_{‑US})
C 200 Kompressor	2000–2002	1,998 cc (121.9 cu in) Supercharged	163 PS (120 kW; 161 hp) at 5,300 rpm	230 N⋅m (170 lbf⋅ft) at 2,500-4,800 rpm	9.3 seconds	230 km/h (143 mph)	9.7 L/100 km (29 mpg_{‑imp}; 24 mpg_{‑US})
C 200 Kompressor	2002–2007	1,796 cc (109.6 cu in); Supercharged	163 PS (120 kW; 161 hp) at 5,500 rpm	240 N⋅m (177 lbf⋅ft) at 3,000-4,000 rpm	9.3 seconds	231 km/h (144 mph)	8.5–8.9 L/100 km (33–32 mpg_{‑imp}; 28–26 mpg_{‑US})
C 200 CGI	2003–2005	1,796 cc (109.6 cu in); Supercharger (Kompressor Engine) / Petrol direct injection (CGI)	170 PS (125 kW; 168 hp) at 5,300 rpm	250 N⋅m (184 lbf⋅ft) at 3,000 rpm	9 seconds	235 km/h (146 mph)	7.8 L/100 km (36 mpg_{‑imp}; 30 mpg_{‑US})
C 230 Kompressor	2002–2005	1,796 cc (109.6 cu in); Supercharged	192 PS (141 kW; 189 hp) at 5,800 rpm	260 N⋅m (192 lbf⋅ft) at 3,500-4,000 rpm	8.5 seconds	240 km/h (149 mph)	8.9 L/100 km (32 mpg_{‑imp}; 26 mpg_{‑US})
V6 engines
C 230 C 230 w/ Flex Fuel option (2007 only)^{1}	2005–2007	2,496 cc (152.3 cu in)	204 PS (150 kW; 201 hp) at 6,100 rpm***	245 N⋅m (181 lbf⋅ft) at 2,900-5,500 rpm***	8.9 seconds	238 km/h (148 mph)	9.3–9.6 L/100 km (30–29 mpg_{‑imp}; 25–25 mpg_{‑US})
C 240 C 240 w/ Flex Fuel option (2005 only)^{2}	2000–2005	2,597 cc (158.5 cu in)	175 PS (129 kW; 173 hp) at 5,500 rpm***	240 N⋅m (177 lbf⋅ft) at 4,500 rpm***	9.2 seconds	235 km/h (146 mph)	10.7 L/100 km (26 mpg_{‑imp}; 22 mpg_{‑US})
C 240 4MATIC	2002–2005	2,597 cc (158.5 cu in)	175 PS (129 kW; 173 hp) at 5,500 rpm***	240 N⋅m (177 lbf⋅ft) at 4,500 rpm***	10 seconds	232 km/h (144 mph)	10.6 L/100 km (27 mpg_{‑imp}; 22 mpg_{‑US})
C 280	2005–2007	2,996 cc (182.8 cu in)	231 PS (170 kW; 228 hp) at 6,000 rpm	300 N⋅m (221 lbf⋅ft) at 2,500-5,000 rpm	7.2 seconds	250 km/h (155 mph)*	9.4–9.7 L/100 km (30–29 mpg_{‑imp}; 25–24 mpg_{‑US})
C 280 4MATIC	2005–2007	2,996 cc (182.8 cu in)	231 PS (170 kW; 228 hp) at 6,000 rpm	300 N⋅m (221 lbf⋅ft) at 2,500-5,000 rpm	7.6 seconds	247 km/h (153 mph)	9.8–10.1 L/100 km (29–28 mpg_{‑imp}; 24–23 mpg_{‑US})
C 320 C 320 w/ Flex Fuel option (2003-2005 only)^{2,3,4}	2000–2005	3,199 cc (195.2 cu in)	218 PS (160 kW; 215 hp) at 5,700 rpm***	310 N⋅m (229 lbf⋅ft) at 3,000-4,600 rpm***	7.7 seconds	248 km/h (154 mph)	10.9 L/100 km (26 mpg_{‑imp}; 21.6 mpg_{‑US})
C 320 4MATIC	2002–2005	3,199 cc (195.2 cu in)	218 PS (160 kW; 215 hp) at 5,700 rpm***	310 N⋅m (229 lbf⋅ft) at 3,000-4,600 rpm***	8 seconds	245 km/h (152 mph)	10.7 L/100 km (26 mpg_{‑imp}; 22 mpg_{‑US})
C 350	2005–2007	3,498 cc (213.5 cu in)	272 PS (200 kW; 268 hp) at 6,000 rpm	350 N⋅m (258 lbf⋅ft) at 2,400-5,000 rpm	6.4 seconds	250 km/h (155 mph)*	9.7–10 L/100 km (29–28 mpg_{‑imp}; 24–24 mpg_{‑US})
C 350 4MATIC	2005–2007	3,498 cc (213.5 cu in)	272 PS (200 kW; 268 hp) at 6,000 rpm	350 N⋅m (258 lbf⋅ft) at 2,400-5,000 rpm	6.4 seconds	250 km/h (155 mph)*	10.3 L/100 km (27 mpg_{‑imp}; 23 mpg_{‑US})
C 32 AMG	2000–2004	3,199 cc (195.2 cu in)	354 PS (260 kW; 349 hp) at 6,100 rpm	450 N⋅m (332 lbf⋅ft) at 4,400 rpm	5.2 seconds	250 km/h (155 mph)*	11.5 L/100 km (25 mpg_{‑imp}; 20.5 mpg_{‑US})
V8 engines
C 55 AMG	2004–2007	5,433 cc (331.5 cu in)	367 PS (270 kW; 362 hp) at 5,750 rpm	510 N⋅m (376 lbf⋅ft) at 4,000 rpm	5.2 seconds	250 km/h (155 mph)*	11.9 L/100 km (23.7 mpg_{‑imp}; 19.8 mpg_{‑US})

Diesel engines
Models	Production years	Displacement	Power	Torque	Acceleration (0–100 km/h, automatic)	Top speed (automatic)	Fuel consumption (combined, automatic)
Inline-4 engines
C 200 CDI**	2000–2003	2,148 cc (131.1 cu in)	116 PS (85 kW; 114 hp) at 4,200 rpm	250 N⋅m (184 lbf⋅ft) at 1,400-2,600 rpm	12.1 seconds	203 km/h (126 mph)	6.1 L/100 km (46 mpg_{‑imp}; 39 mpg_{‑US})
C 200 CDI**	2003–2007	2,148 cc (131.1 cu in)	122 PS (90 kW; 120 hp) at 4,200 rpm	270 N⋅m (199 lbf⋅ft) at 1,600-2,800 rpm	11.9 seconds	208 km/h (129 mph)	6.9 L/100 km (41 mpg_{‑imp}; 34 mpg_{‑US})
C220 CDI	2000–2003	2,148 cc (131.1 cu in)	143 PS (105 kW; 141 hp) at 4,200 rpm	315 N⋅m (232 lbf⋅ft) at 1,800-2,600 rpm	10.1 seconds	220 km/h (137 mph)	6.2 L/100 km (46 mpg_{‑imp}; 38 mpg_{‑US})
C220 CDI	2004-2007	2,148 cc (131.1 cu in)	150 PS (110 kW; 148 hp) at 4,200 rpm	340 N⋅m (251 lbf⋅ft) at 2,000 rpm	10.1 seconds	224 km/h (139 mph)	6.8–6.9 L/100 km (42–41 mpg_{‑imp}; 35–34 mpg_{‑US})
Inline-5 engines
C270 CDI	2000–2003	2,685 cc (163.8 cu in)	170 PS (125 kW; 168 hp) at 4,200 rpm	370 N⋅m (273 lbf⋅ft) at 1,600-2,800 rpm	8.9 seconds	230 km/h (143 mph)	6.8 L/100 km (42 mpg_{‑imp}; 35 mpg_{‑US})
C270 CDI	2003–2005	2,685 cc (163.8 cu in)	170 PS (125 kW; 168 hp) at 4,200 rpm	400 N⋅m (295 lbf⋅ft) at 1,800-2,600 rpm	8.9 seconds	230 km/h (143 mph)	6.8 L/100 km (42 mpg_{‑imp}; 35 mpg_{‑US})
C 30 CDI AMG	2003–2004	2,950 cc (180 cu in)	231 PS (170 kW; 228 hp) at 3,800 rpm	540 N⋅m (398 lbf⋅ft) at 2,000-2,500 rpm	6.8 seconds	250 km/h (155 mph)*	7.6 L/100 km (37 mpg_{‑imp}; 31 mpg_{‑US})
V6 engines
C320 CDI	2005–2007	2,987 cc (182.3 cu in)	224 PS (165 kW; 221 hp) at 3,800 rpm	510 N⋅m (376 lbf⋅ft) at 1,600-2,800 rpm	7.2 seconds	250 km/h (155 mph)*	7.3–7.6 L/100 km (39–37 mpg_{‑imp}; 32–31 mpg_{‑US})

*Electronically limited

**For fleet vehicles, power is rated at 102 PS (75 kW; 101 hp) and torque is rated at 235 N⋅m (173 lbf⋅ft) at 1,800 rpm

***Performance may vary in vehicles designated as "flexible fuel" or flex-fuel. Based on premium fuel. Performance may vary with fuel octane rating as specified in Operator's Manual.

^{1} Please see 2007 Operator's Manual C-Class

^{2}Please see 2005 Operator's Manual C-Class

^{3}Please see 2004 Operator's Manual C-Class

^{4}Please see 2003 Operator's Manual C-Class

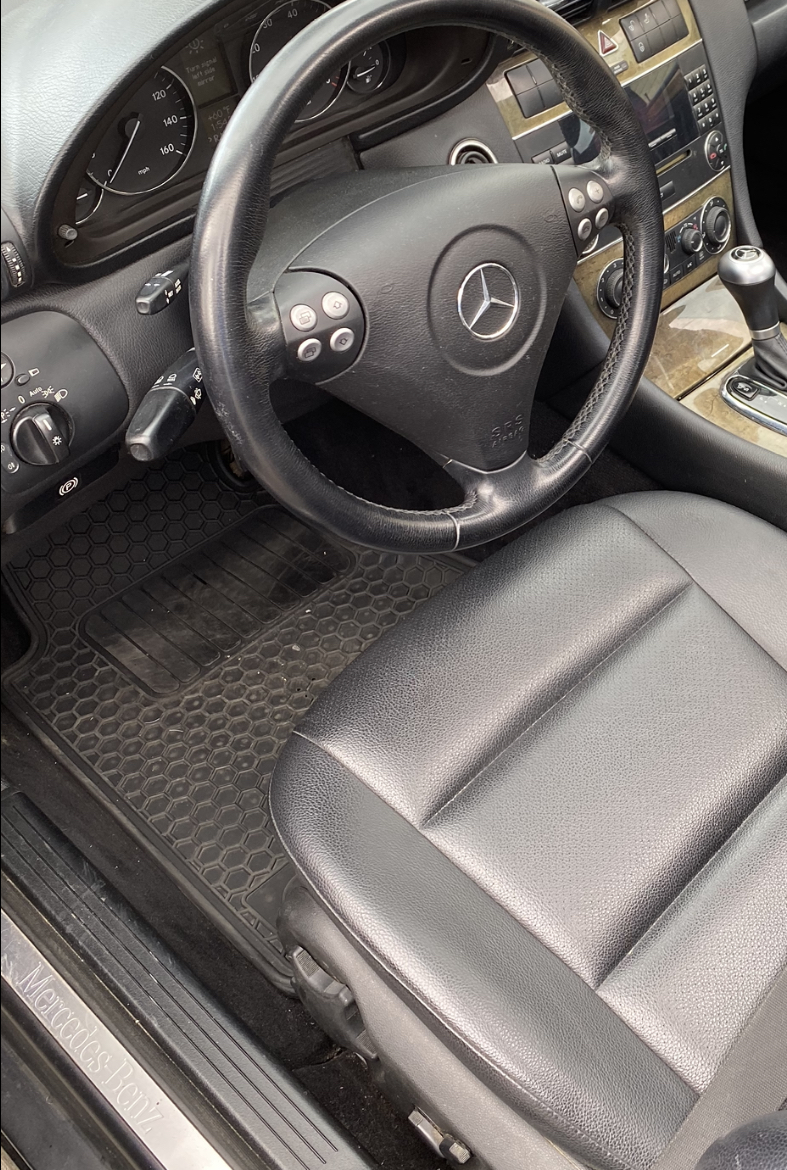
Sport edition interior update/refresh (2005–2007)

=== Flexible Fuel ("Flex-Fuel") models (2003–2007) ===
==== C 320 (2003–2005) ====
Mercedes-Benz began offering their flexible fuel (flex-fuel) option in the C 320 Sedan, C 320 Sport Sedan, C 320 wagon, and C320 Sport Coupe from 2003 until 2005.

==== C 240 (2005) ====
Mercedes-Benz offered the flexible fuel (flex-fuel) option in the C 240 Sedan and Wagon in 2005 only.

==== C 230 (2007) ====
Mercedes-Benz later offered the flexible fuel (flex-fuel) option to the 2007 C 230 Sport Sedan.

=== AMG models (2001–2007) ===
==== C 32 AMG (2001–2003) ====
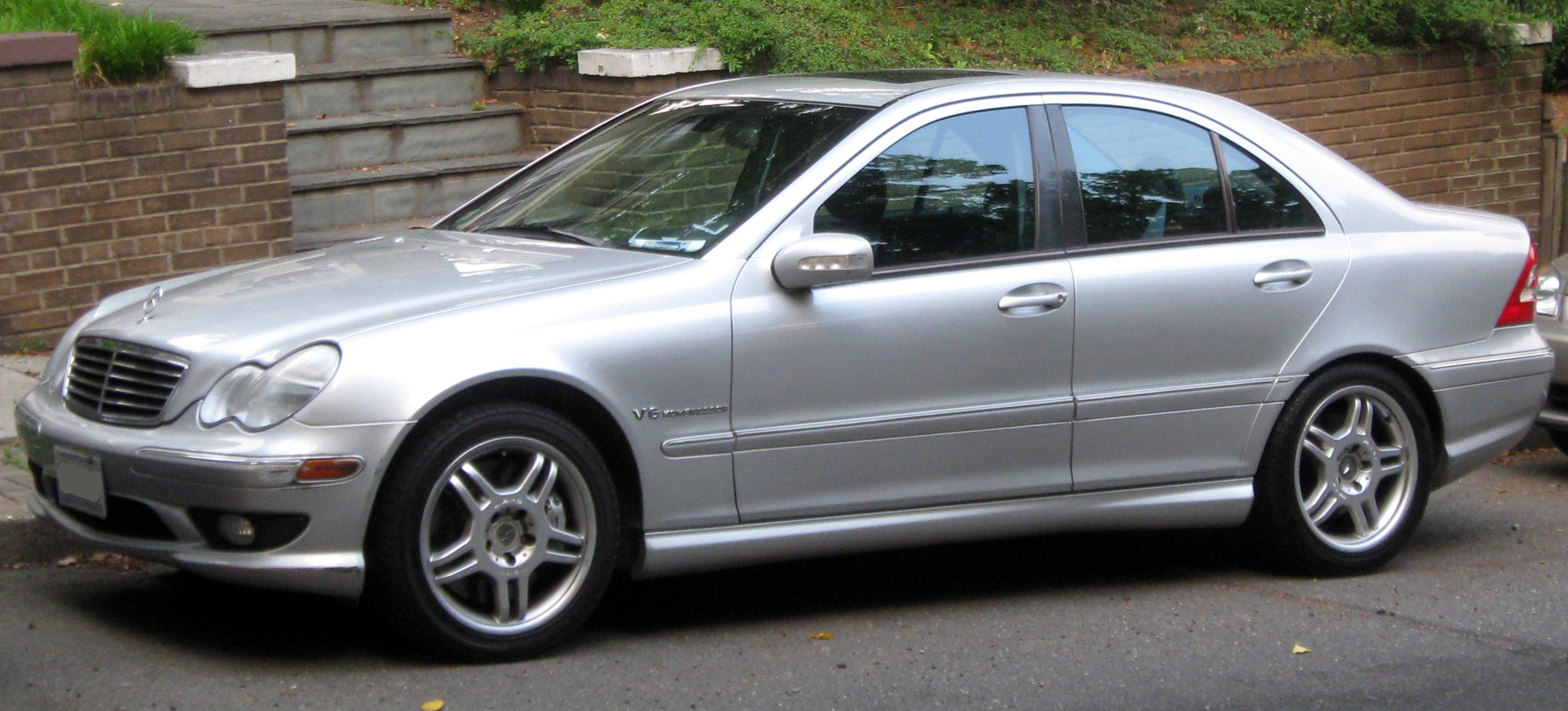
Pre-facelift Mercedes-Benz C 32 AMG (North America)

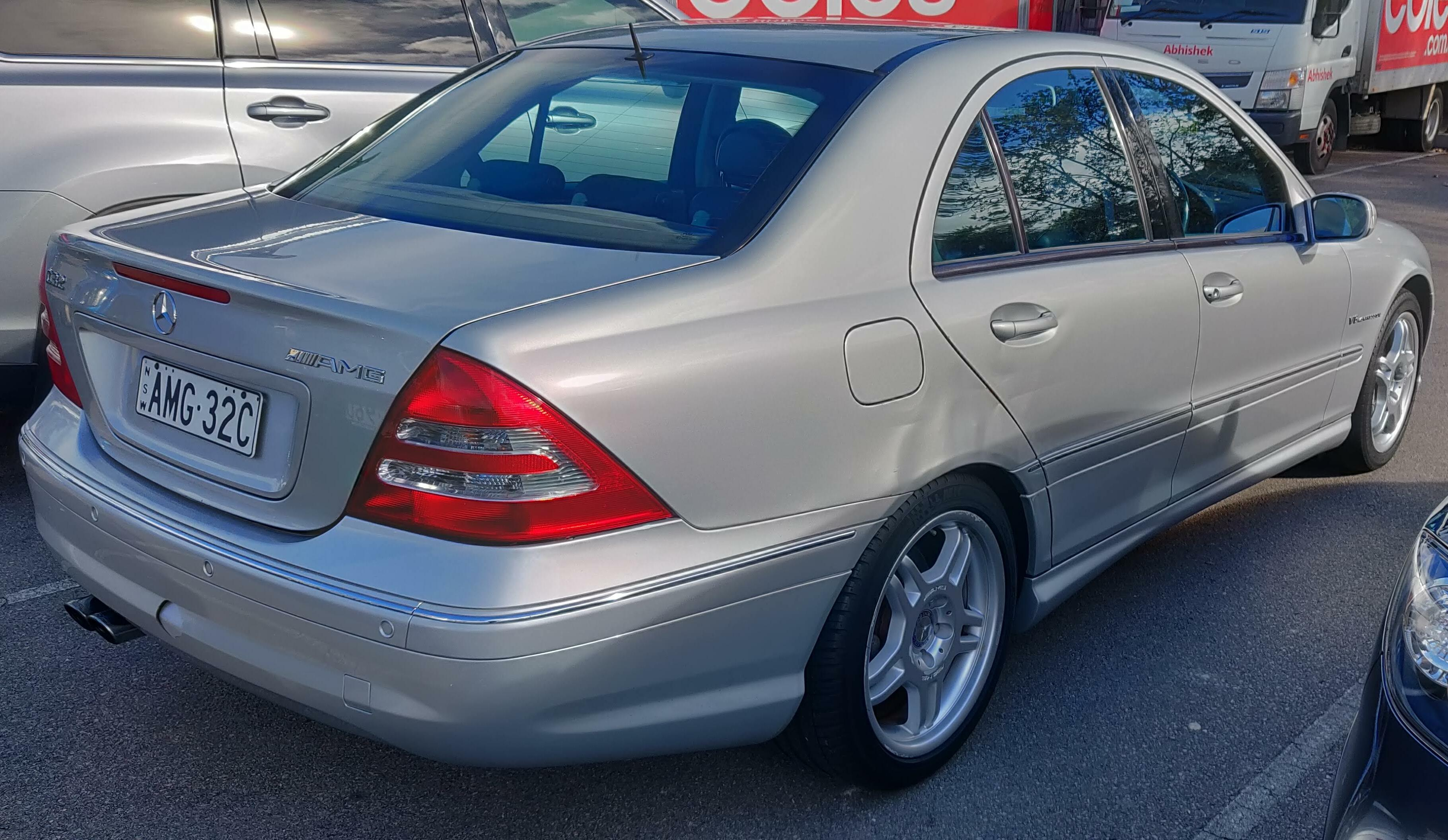
Mercedes-Benz C 32 AMG (Australia)

After the performance of the AMG models in the previous generation, Mercedes-Benz attempted to increase sales among high-end buyers by introducing two different AMG versions of the new model in 2001. To match the BMW E46 M3 displacement and improve weight distribution, the C 32 AMG scaled back down to a 3.2-litre V6 engine with a twin-screw type supercharger (manufactured by IHI) to reach 260 kW (354 PS) and 450 N⋅m (332 lb⋅ft). Like its predecessors, it used a five-speed automatic, helping it to complete a 0 to 100 km/h (0 to 62 mph) sprint in 5.2 seconds. The C 32 AMG was produced as a sedan/saloon (6,695 made), station wagon (1,556 made) only for European markets, and SportCoupé (liftback) which was only offered in 2002 and 2003 by special request as an AMG STUDIO order with the production numbers unknown.

==== C 30 CDI AMG (2002–2004) ====
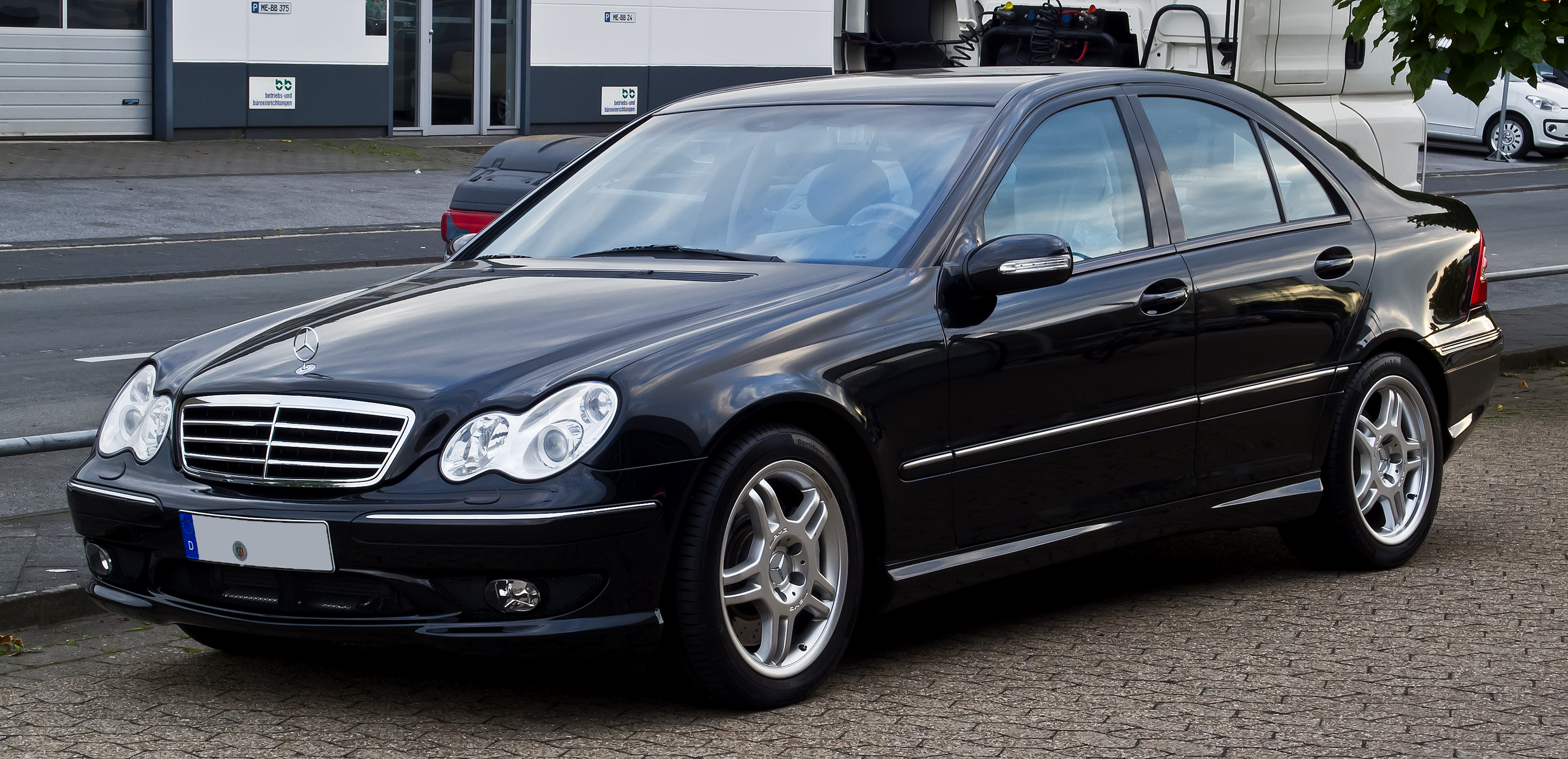
Facelift Mercedes-Benz C 30 CDI AMG

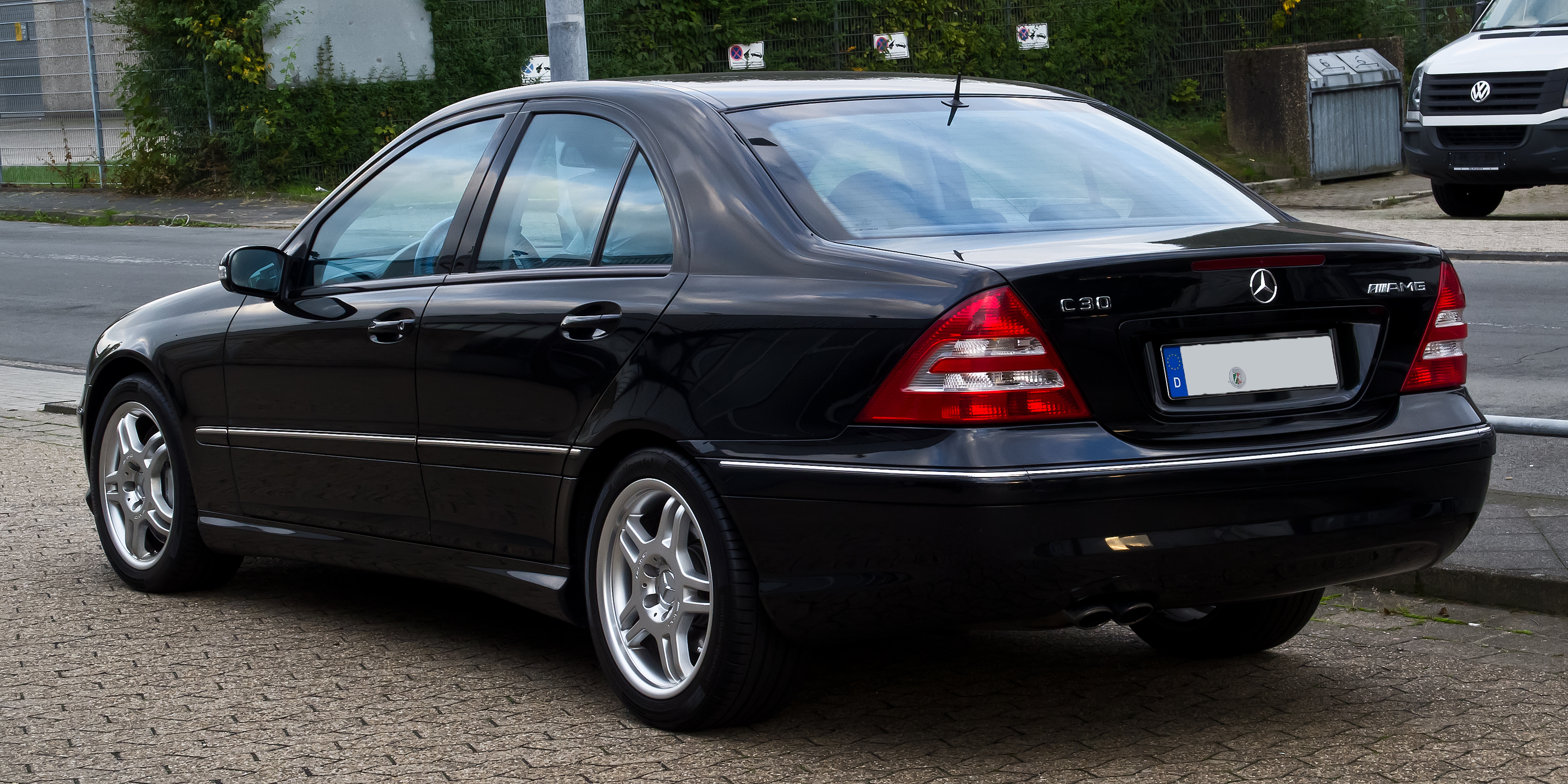
Facelift Mercedes-Benz C 30 CDI AMG

Another version was the C 30 CDI AMG, using a 3.0-litre five-cylinder diesel engine, capable of 170 kW (231 PS) and 540 N⋅m (398 lb⋅ft). Like the C 32, it was available in all three body styles, but this diesel model did not reach sales expectations and was retired in 2004. The car's exterior resembled that of the C 32 AMG. To this day, it is the only diesel AMG ever offered, except for the pre merger AMG modified MB100 van, which used AMG tuned OM616 and OM617 engines.

==== C 55 AMG (2005–2006) ====
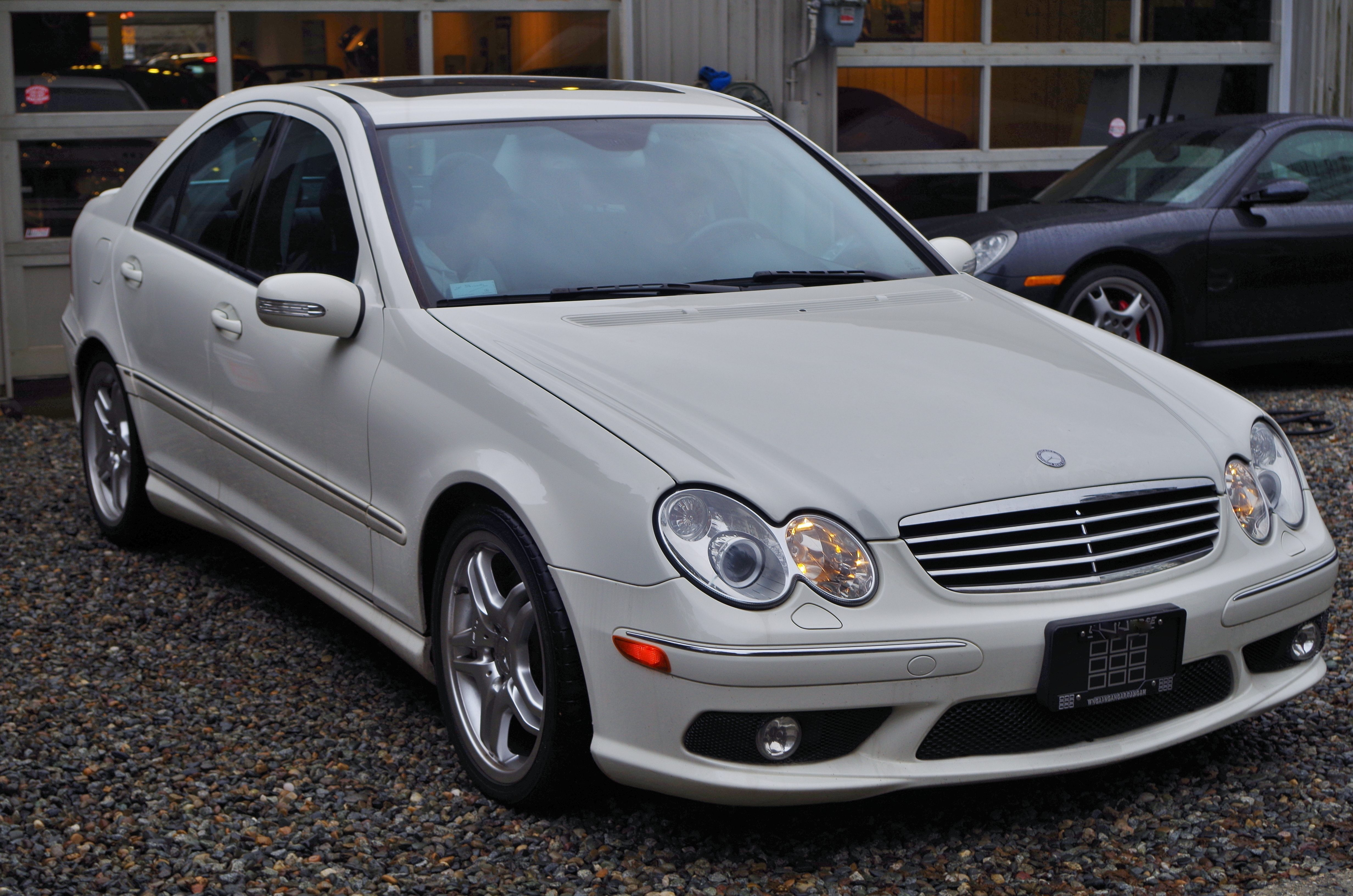
Facelift Mercedes-Benz C 55 AMG (North America)

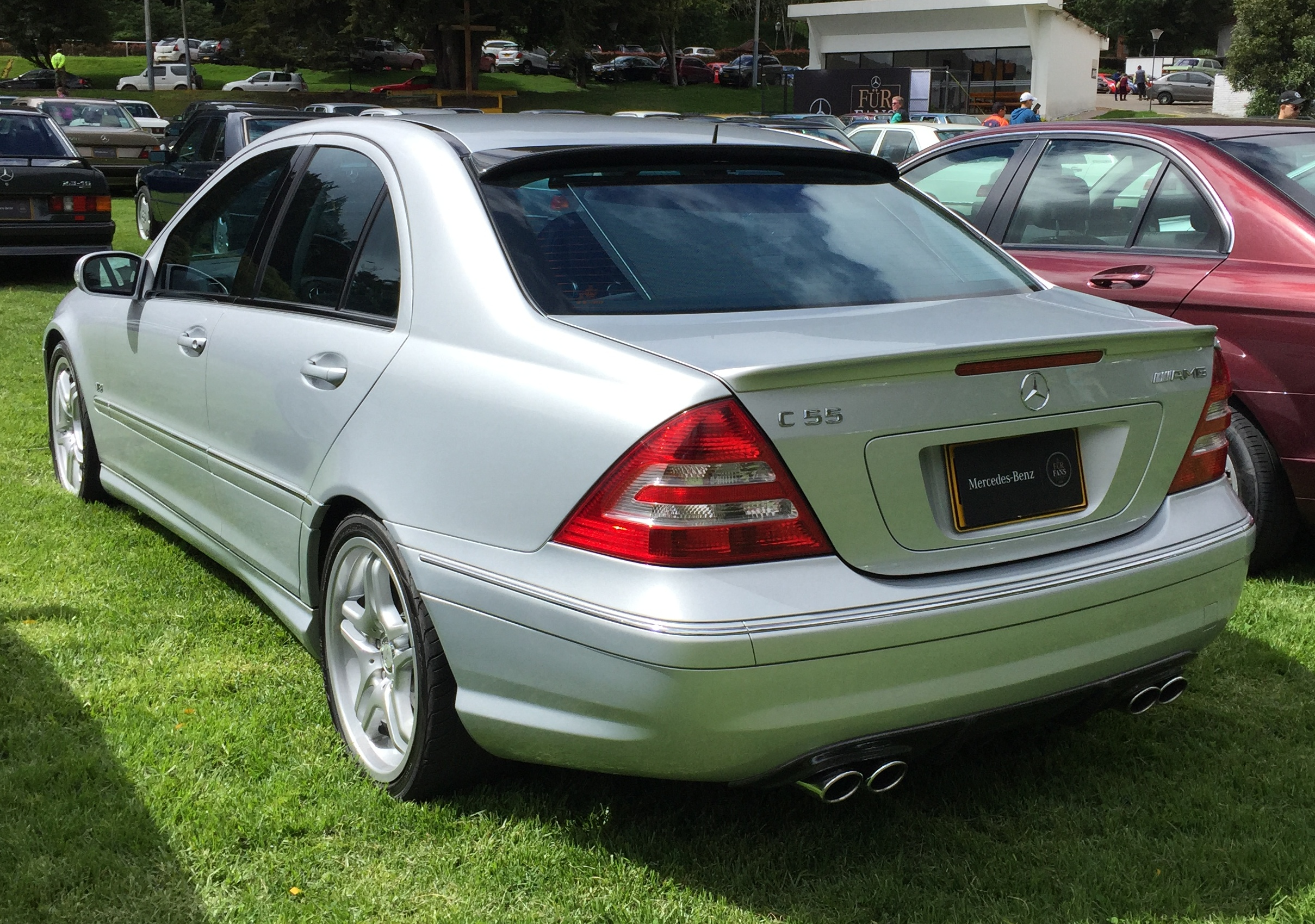
Mercedes-Benz C 55 AMG (North America)

Along with the mid-generation refresh of the C-Class in 2005, the C 32 AMG was also replaced, giving way to a new 5.4-litre naturally aspirated V8-powered C 55 AMG. This was an evolution of the V8 engine found in the previous E-Class, with power raised to 270 kW (367 PS) and torque climbing to 510 N⋅m (376 lb⋅ft). The C 55 AMG uses a V8 from the same engine family as the W202 generation C 43 AMG, the M113. Though maximum speed is still electronically limited to 250 km/h (155 mph), the 0 to 100 km/h (0 to 62 mph) time has dropped to 4.7 seconds. Unlike the less-powerful V6s in the rest of the Mercedes-Benz lineup, the C 55 AMG continued to use the five-speed automatic with AMG Speedshift. The C 55 shares its longer engine bay and front end design with the CLK 55 AMG to accommodate the larger 5.4-litre V8 engine. The front of the car had to be extended by about 80 millimetres. The C 55 AMG is one of two AMG models to feature different structure than its base Mercedes platform, the other being the W204 C 63 with its custom elongated engine bay. The C 55 was the first AMG C-Class to feature quad exhaust outlets and an external differential cooler. The Nürburgring Nordschleife lap time seen on List of Nürburgring Nordschleife lap times for the C 55 AMG is 8:22 compared to 8:37 for the C 32 AMG mainly due to the revised suspension and extra torque. The C 55 was mainly sold as a sedan with a portion of wagons being sold in European markets. Although only offered for a brief period of time the C 55 AMG has been praised for its reliability, as the preceding C 32 AMG (W203) and the succeeding C 63 AMG (W204) were plagued by engine issues.

== Coupe (CL203) ==
=== C-Class Sport Coupé (2000–2008) ===
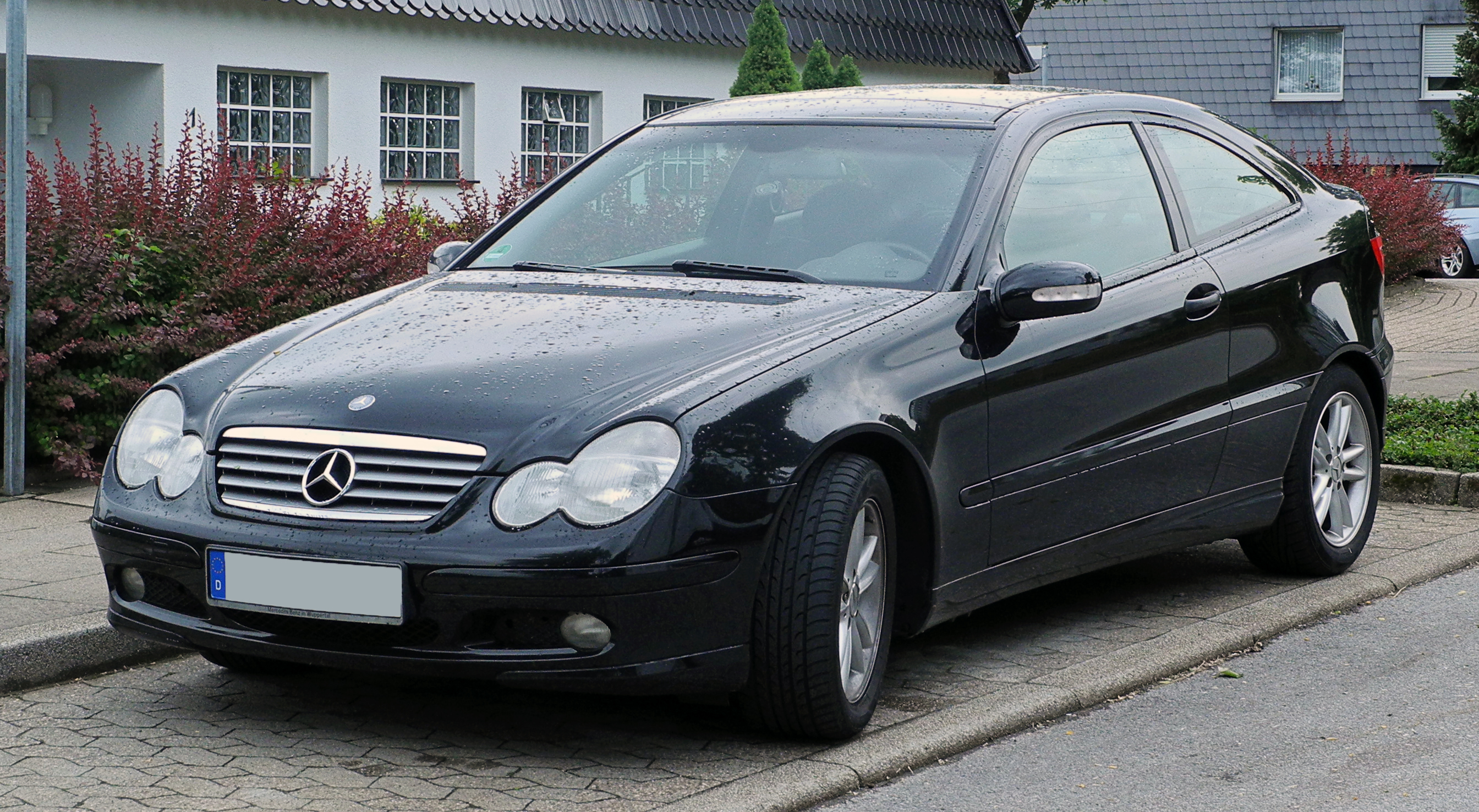
2001–2004 Mercedes-Benz C 230 K Sport Coupé

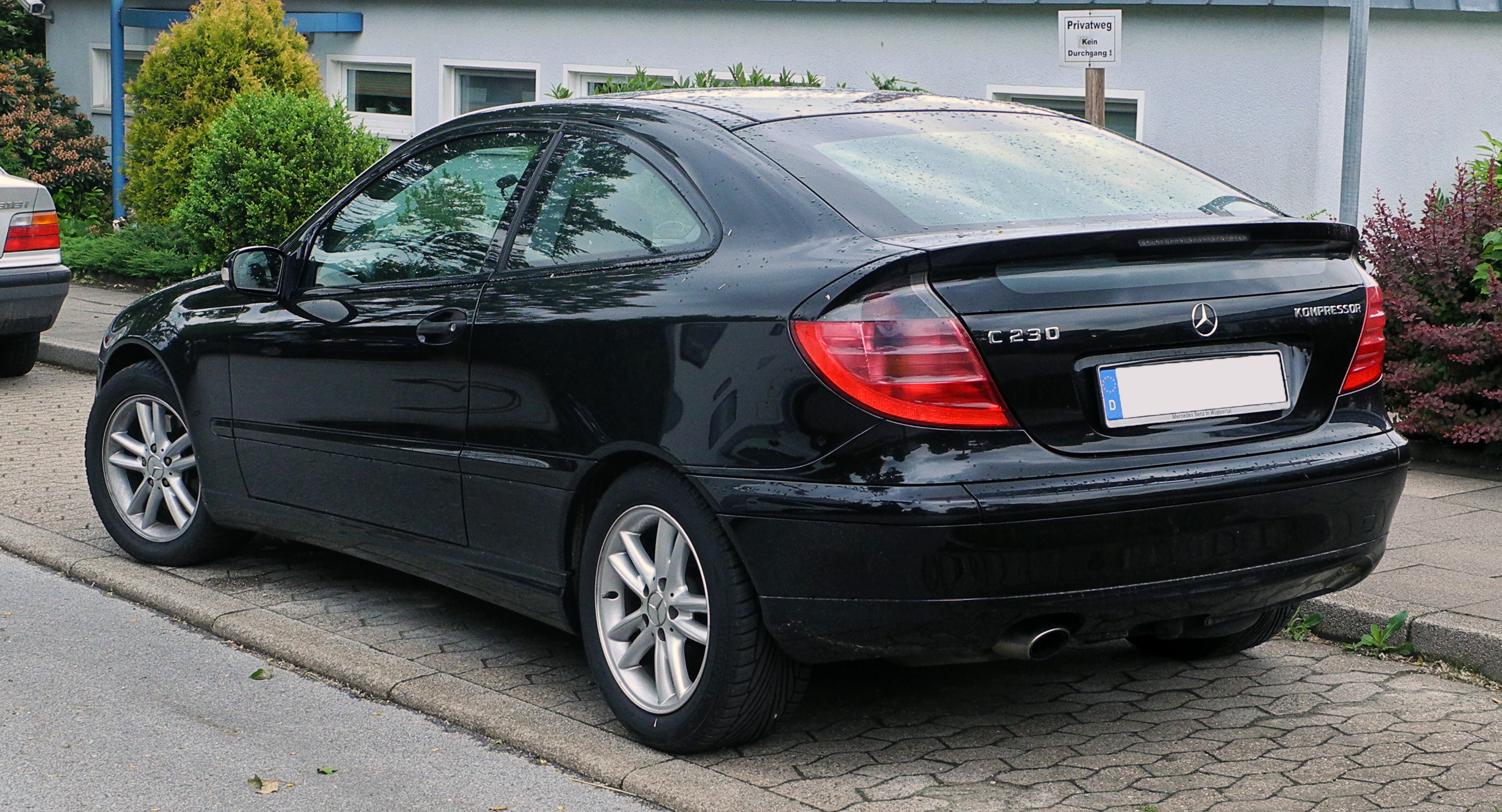
2001–2004 Mercedes-Benz C 230 K Sport Coupé

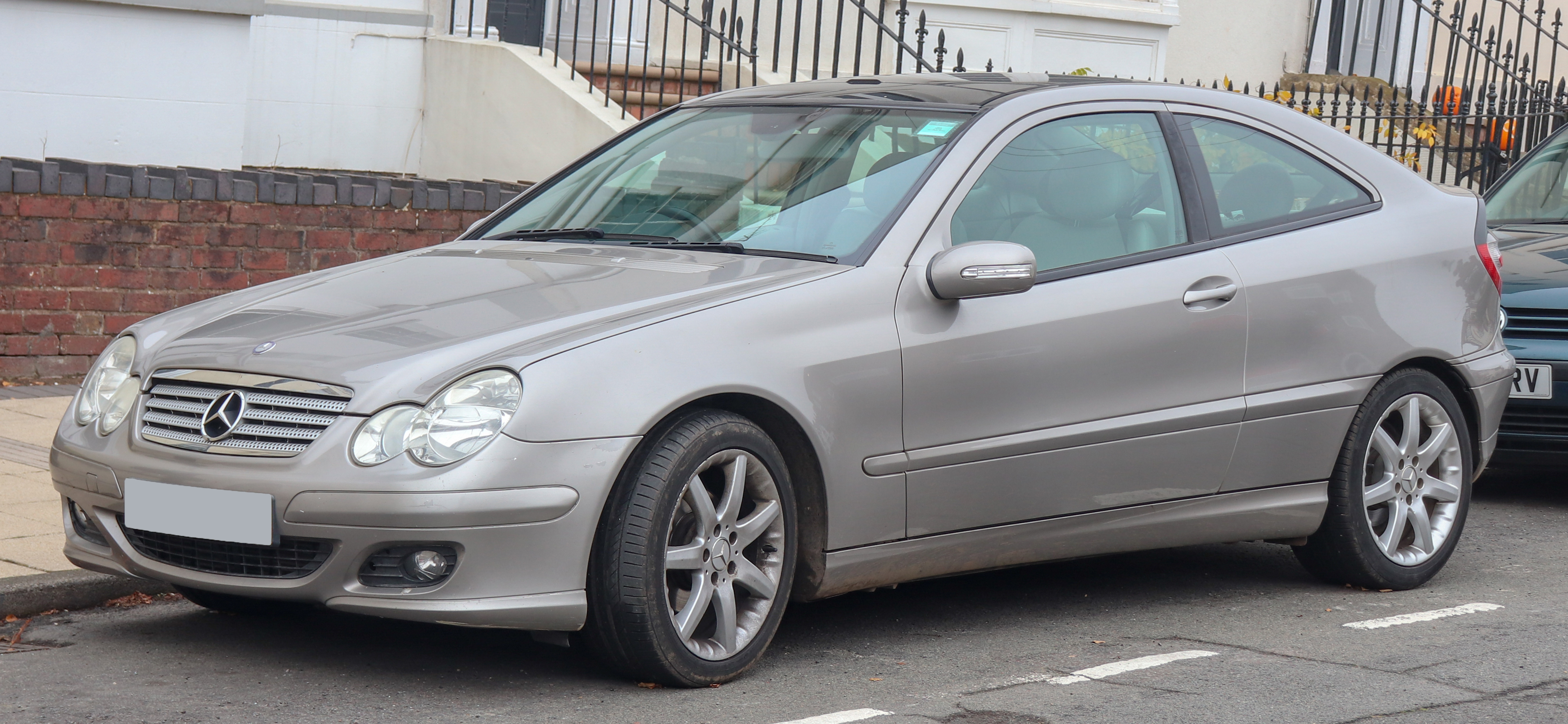
2006 Mercedes-Benz C 220 Sport Coupé

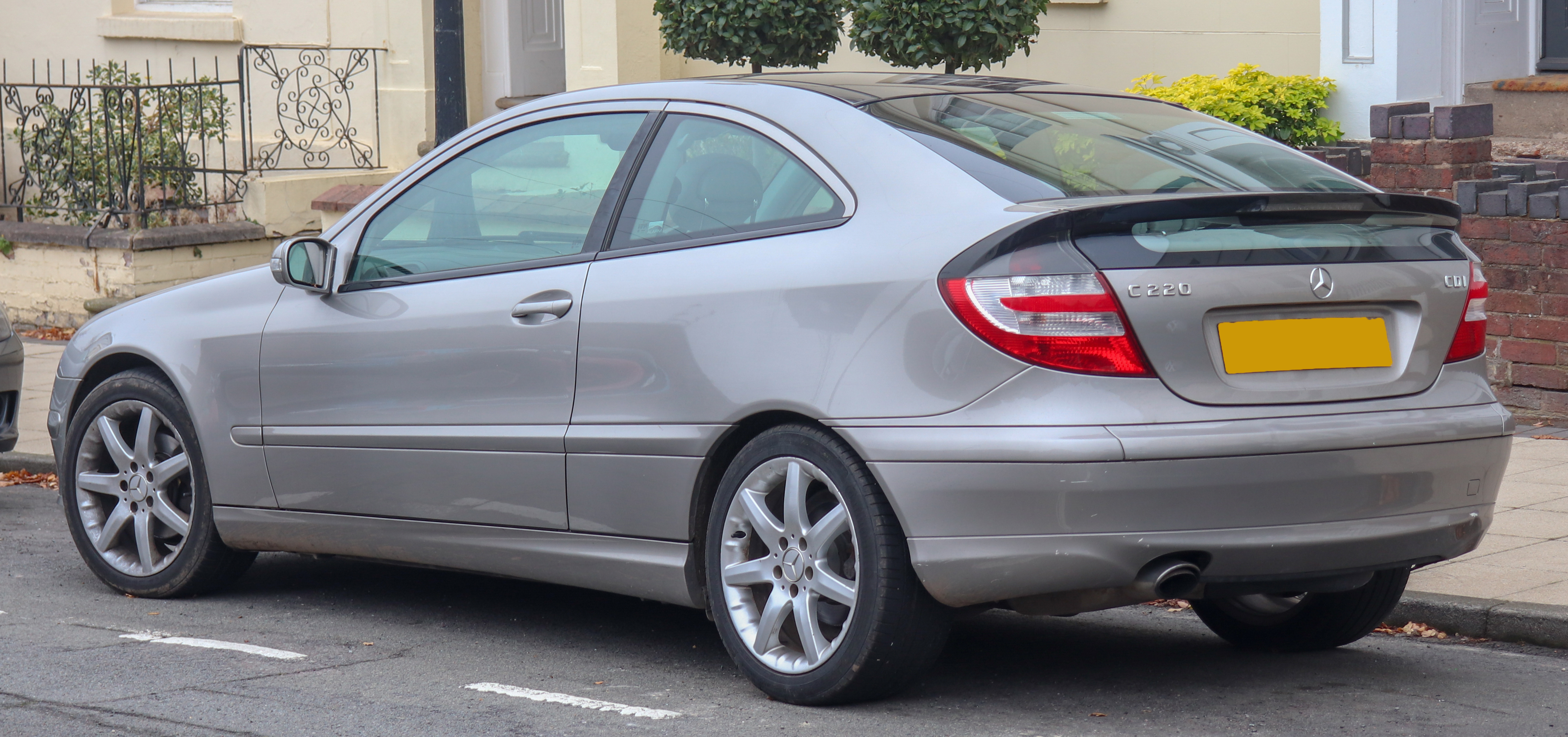
2006 Mercedes-Benz C 220 Sport Coupé

Mercedes introduced the C-Class Sport Coupé (codenamed "Peanut" ver. CL203) to Europe in October 2000 as a three-door hatchback coupe, based on the regular W203 C-Class range. North American sales began in 2001 for the 2002 model year.

Whereas the C-Class sedan and wagon had the traditional Mercedes horizontal bar grille with the hood ornament, the Sport Coupé had a star-grille front end giving it a sportier look. The Sport Coupé also had a fastback roofline, an optional panoramic sunroof, and a functional rear spoiler to provide downforce at high speeds. The Sport Coupé was seven inches (178 mm) shorter overall than the sedan, while sharing the same wheelbase length.

Initial Sport Coupé engine configurations included the C 180 (129 PS), C 220 (143 PS), C 200 Kompressor, and C 230 Kompressor. In 2003, Mercedes-Benz added the C 180 Kompressor, the C 200 CGI, and C 30 CDI AMG. In 2005 the C 160 Kompressor was made available. There was also the C 32 AMG with 260 kW (354 PS) and 450 N⋅m (332 lb⋅ft) which was available only by special order from AMG STUDIO for the 2003 model year, making the C 32 AMG Sport Coupé much rarer than its saloon and wagon counterparts.)

The C 230 Sport Coupé was powered by a 2.3-litre supercharged, four-cylinder motor (M111) with output of 143 kW (192 hp) and 281 N⋅m (207 lb⋅ft) of torque, which was more powerful than the C 240 sedan's 175 PS (129 kW; 173 hp) V6 engine, although the M111 was coarse and noisy at the high end. In 2003 the M111 was replaced with a quieter and more efficient DOHC supercharged 1.8 litre four-cylinder engine (M271).

The C 230 Sport Coupé and the C 320 Sport Coupé were the two most inexpensive models in the Mercedes-Benz lineup of the United States and Canada at the time, although at least some noted the idea of an "inexpensive Mercedes" undermined the marque's association in certain markets with expensive cars. The C 230 base trim enabled the automaker to reach a lower price point than existing models sold in North America, although it lacked standard leather seats and a CD player which were amenities typically expected of German luxury imports, and adding those options made the car similarly as expensive as the BMW 325Ci Coupe and Audi TT both of which had better handling. The Sport Coupé's liftback profile was seen as sleeker and more graceful while providing ample passenger room and storage space, compared to its closest competitor in the BMW 3 Series Compact which was derisively regarded as a truncated regular BMW 3 Series Coupé. Although the hatchback body style was declining in popularity among North American customers during the late 1990s, resulting in the first generation 3 Series Compact being pulled from that market in 1999 after a short sales run, Mercedes offered the Sport Coupé for the 2002 model year onward alongside other W203 C-Class models. Mercedes found that the C-Class Sport Coupé was a popular first Mercedes for new customers, 40% of whom reportedly return to subsequently buy more expensive models.

=== CLC-Class (2008–2011) ===
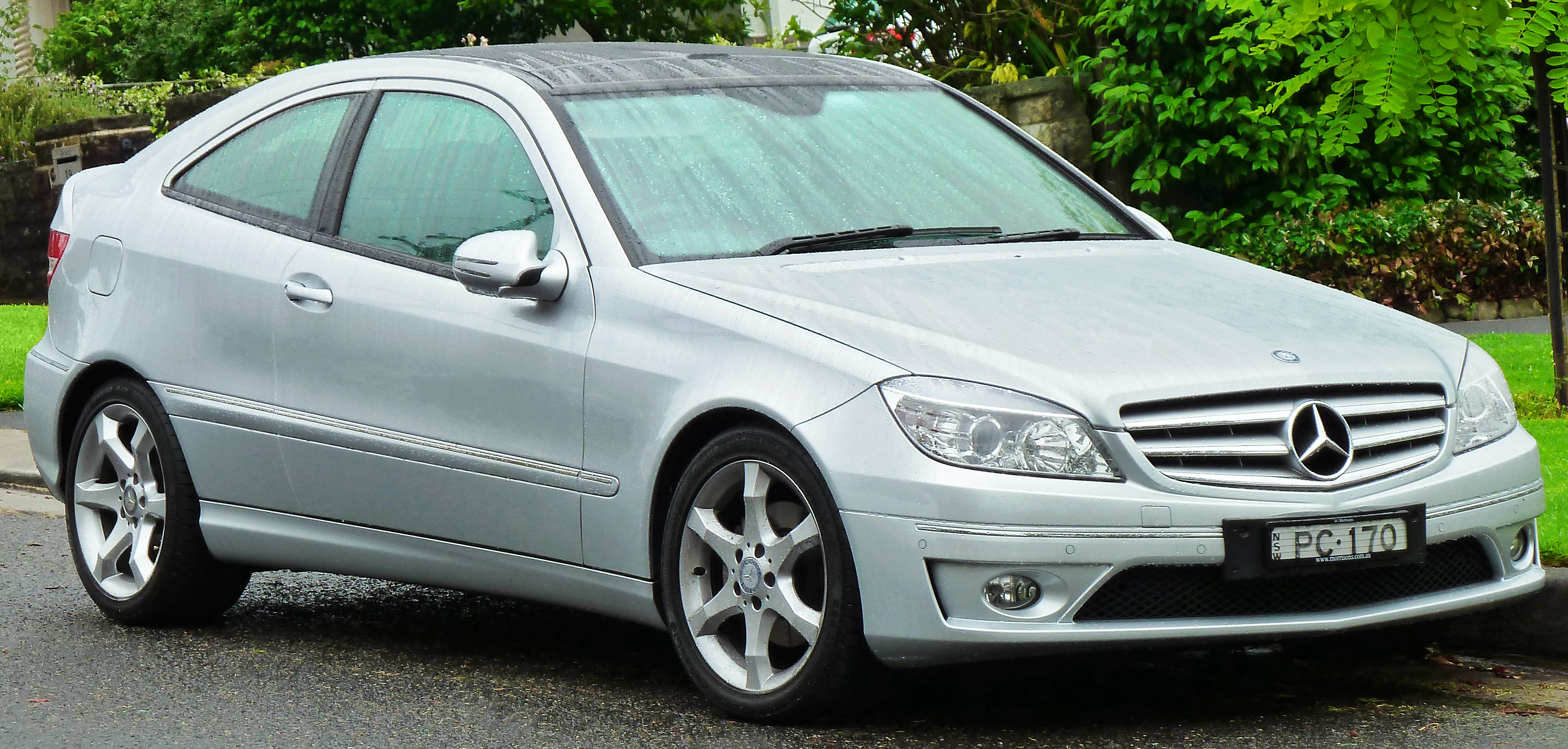

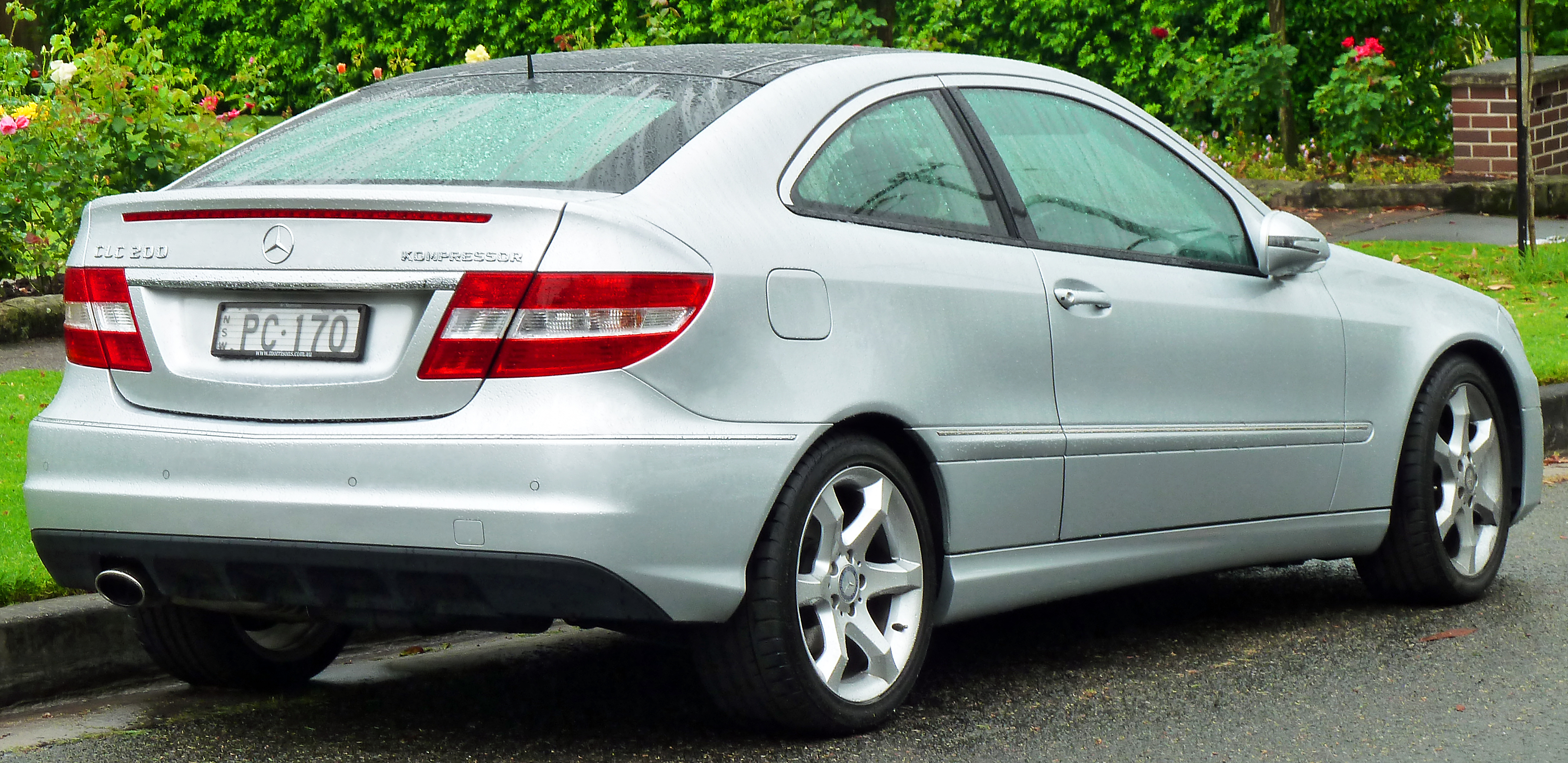
Mercedes-Benz CLC 200

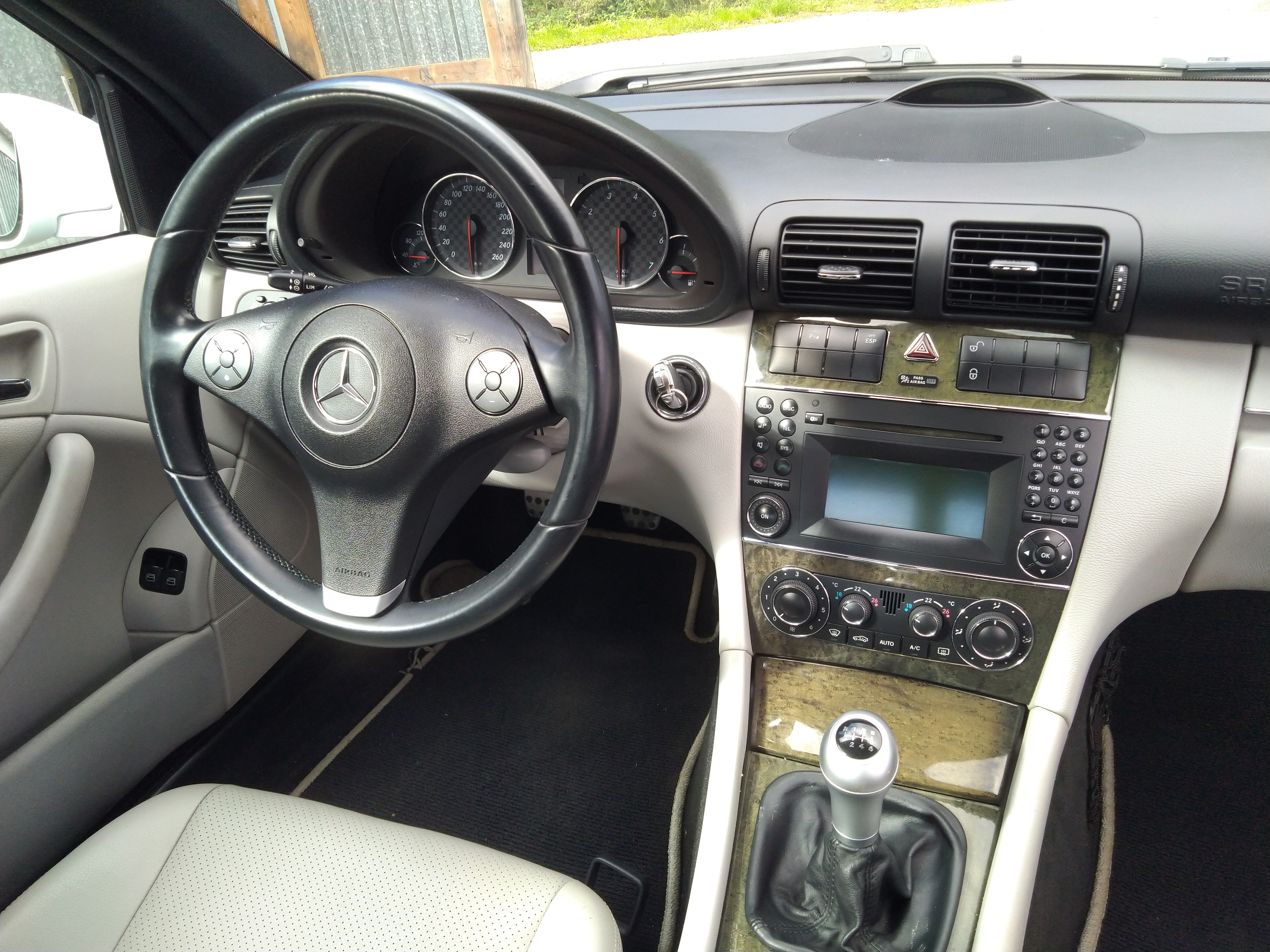
Interior

The Sport Coupé was spun off into its own separate line called the CLC-Class in 2008. The car was presented at the 2008 Mercedes-Benz Fashion Week Berlin, which took place from 27 to 31 January. The CLC was produced in Brazil at the company's plant in Juiz de Fora, close to the state border with Rio de Janeiro.

Although the CLC is still based on the W203 platform, it was refreshed with an updated front and tail inspired by the W204 series C-Class. The refresh reworked the rear and front along with some other refinements and new details (Mercedes claimed around 1,100 components), including a steering system borrowed from the SLK-Class and a revised suspension. Out of the sheetmetal of the CLC-Class, only the doors, roof and quarter panels were carried over from the C-Class Sport Coupé. The interior is still largely similar to the first-generation Sport Coupé, although it did receive the steering wheel from the facelifted W219 and an updated optional navigation system.

Some auto journalists noted that the improvements were limited in order to differentiate the CLC-Class and protect the status of the more lucrative marques in the lineup; one reviewer stated the "CLC does just about enough to introduce new customers to the world of Mercedes" and that it had the "feel of an authentic Mercedes-Benz, which is more than I’d say about the A-Class and B-Class front-wheel-drive hatchbacks". Due to the age of the W203 platform which "exudes a level of float and wallow" not found in the W204 C-Class, the CLC received mixed reviews against sportier rivals such as the BMW 1 Series coupé (a successful replacement of the 3 Series hatchback).

In 2009 the CLC 160 BlueEFFICIENCY was added to the range, and the CLC 230 was rechristened as the CLC 250.

Daimler AG decided that the CLC would not continue production. Instead, the W204 C-Class received a traditionally designed coupé added to the lineup for the 2012 model year, coinciding with the facelifted W204 sedan/saloon in the fourth quarter of 2011. The 2012 C-Class Coupe is positioned directly against the BMW 3 Series Coupé (later 4 Series). The A-Class would be redesigned to compete with the BMW 1 Series.

==== CLC-series engines ====
Petrol engines
Model	Type	Power, torque@rpm
CLC 160 BlueEFFICIENCY	1.6 DOHC 16V I4 supercharger	129 PS (95 kW; 127 hp)
CLC 180 KOMPRESSOR	1.8 DOHC 16V I4 supercharged	143 PS (105 kW; 141 hp)
CLC 200 KOMPRESSOR	1.8 DOHC 16V I4 supercharged	184 PS (135 kW; 181 hp)
CLC 230 / CLC 250	2.5 DOHC 24V V6	204 PS (150 kW; 201 hp)
CLC 350	3.5 DOHC 24V V6	272 PS (200 kW; 268 hp)

Diesel engines
Model	Type	Power, torque@rpm
CLC 200 CDI	2.1 16V I4 turbo	122 PS (90 kW; 120 hp)
CLC 220 CDI	2.1 16V I4 turbo	150 PS (110 kW; 148 hp)

== Safety ==
ANCAP test results Mercedes-Benz C-Class (2000)
Test	Score
Overall	5 /5 stars
Frontal offset	13.82/16
Side impact	15.87/16
Pole	1/2
Seat belt reminders	2/3
Whiplash protection	Not Assessed
Pedestrian protection	Marginal
Electronic stability control	Standard
