= Mercedes-Benz 320A =

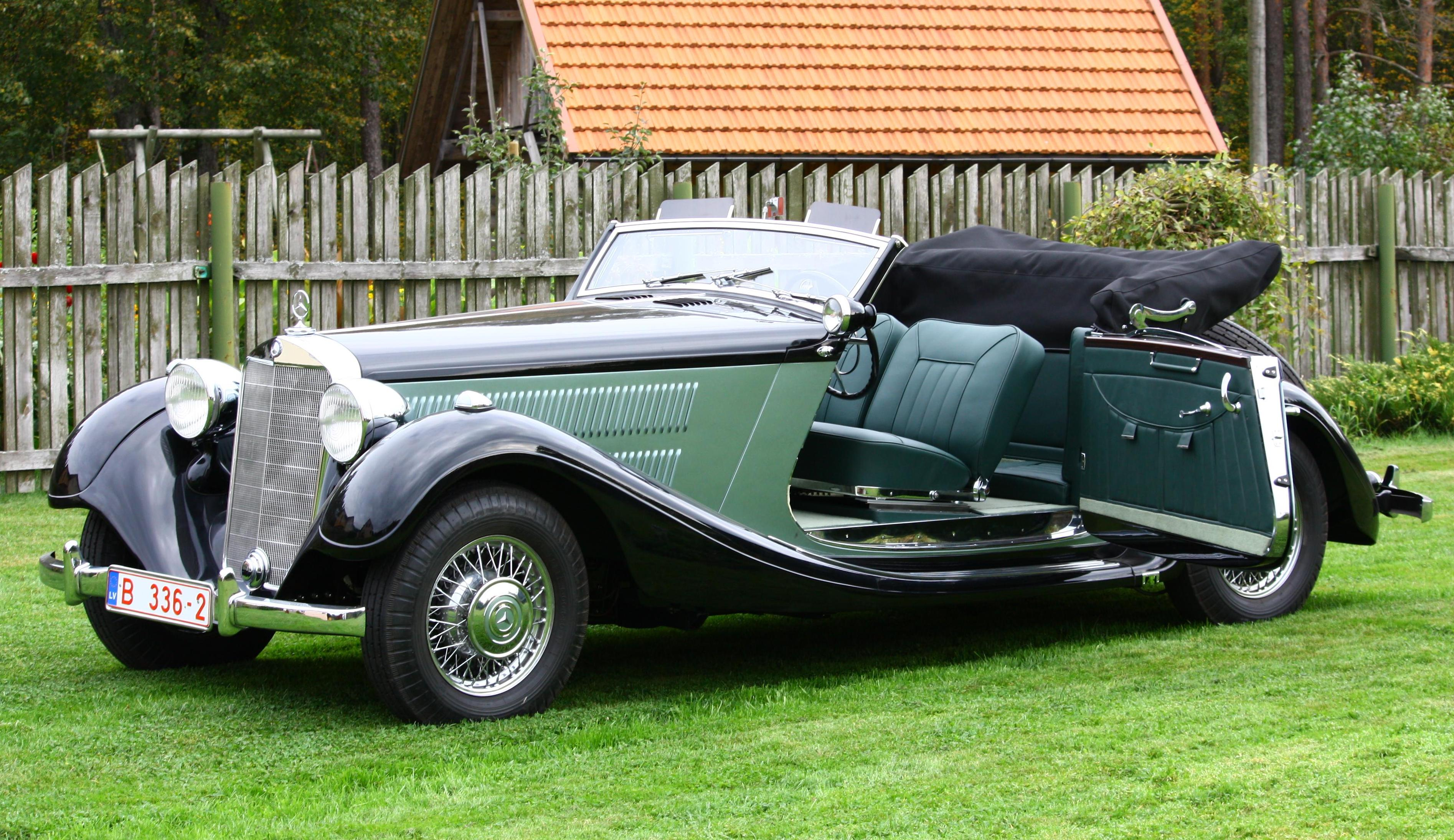
- Pictured September, 2011

Overview
- Manufacturer: Mercedes-Benz
- Production: 1938–1942
- Assembly: Germany: Stuttgart
- Designer: Max Sailer

Body and chassis
- Class: Sports car
- Body style: 2-door cabriolet
- Layout: FMR layout

Powertrain
- Engine: M142II, 85mm, 3405cm³

Chronology
- Predecessor: Mercedes-Benz 380, W22; Mercedes-Benz 290, W18

The Mercedes-Benz 320A is a cabriolet built by German automobile manufacturer Mercedes-Benz between 1938 and 1942. The new model was lower, longer, and broader than its predecessor Mercedes-Benz 290 of type W18, the production of which started on 1933. The new model was displayed for the first time at the Berlin Auto Show on 1937. The design process of the new Mercedes-Benz 320A was led by the former race driver Max Sailer and its obviously sporty appearance was partly due to the influence of the luxurious Mercedes-Benz 540K, the model called "Silver Arrow".

== Design ==
In 1938 Germany introduced the law for using low octane fuel and it nearly halted the production of sport-type cars. However, Mercedes-Benz was not prepared to discontinue the production of their highly successful sport-type car model. Thus the engine of W18 experienced another upgrade - this time round it became 85 mm and its volume increased to reach 3405 cm³. The compression was reduced from 6.6 to 6.25, whereas the power and driving speed of previous model was retained. This modified engine known as M142 II was coupled with a redesigned 4-speed gearbox and supplemented with an overdrive gear. This version of Mercedes-Benz 320A with its increased engine volume was manufactured until the course of warfare interfered and halted the production of the model in 1942.
