= Mercedes-Benz E-Class =

Executive car

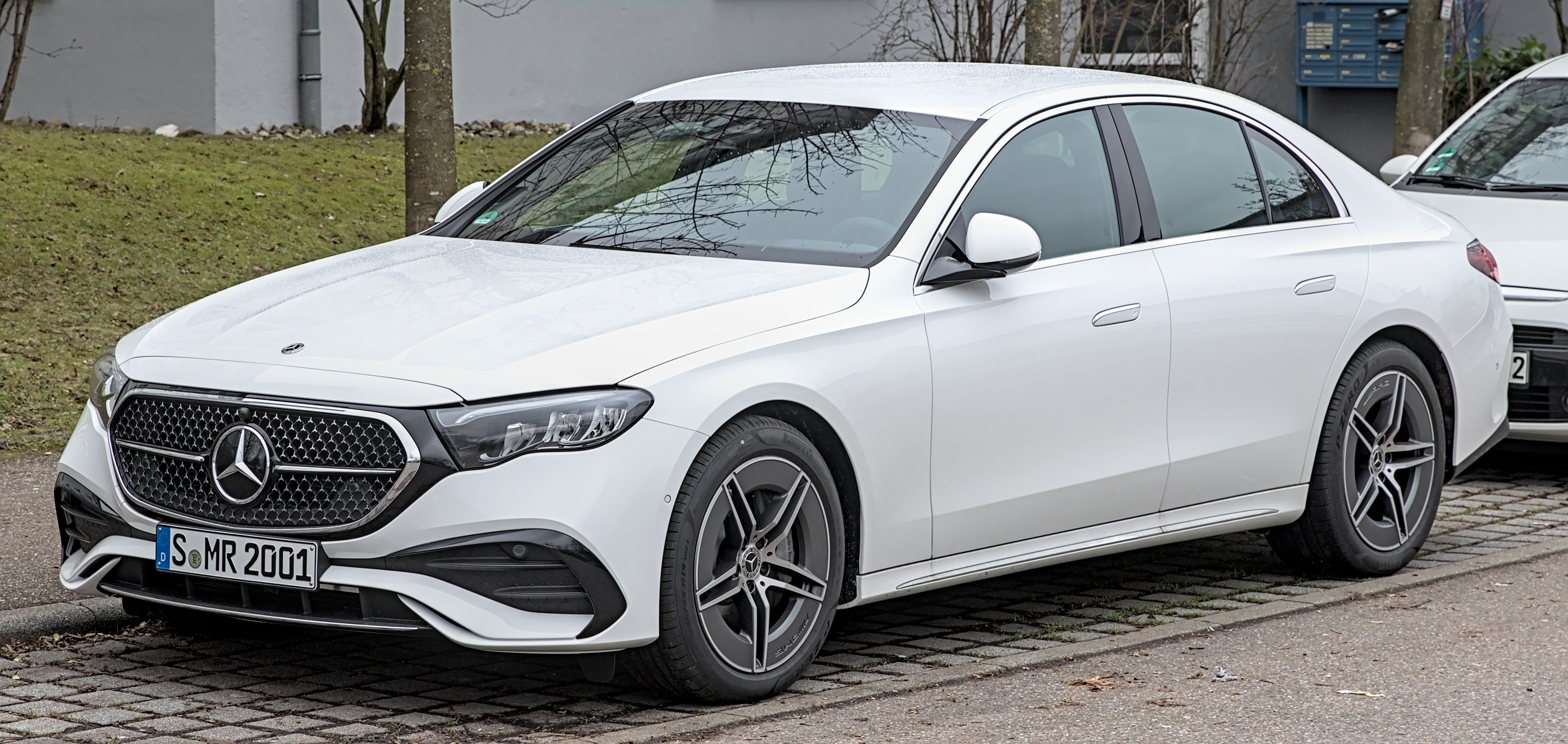

Overview
- Manufacturer: Daimler-Benz (1993–1998); DaimlerChrysler (1998–2007); Daimler AG (2007–2022); Mercedes-Benz Group (2022–present)
- Production: 1953-Present (E-Class nomenclature adopted in July 1993)

Body and chassis
- Class: Executive car (E)
- Layout: Front-engine, rear-wheel-drive or all-wheel-drive

Chronology
- Predecessor: Mercedes-Benz W124 (pre-facelift models, 1984–1993)

The Mercedes-Benz E-Class is a range of executive cars manufactured by German automaker Mercedes-Benz in various engine and body configurations. Produced since September 1953, the E-Class falls as a midrange in the Mercedes line-up, and has been marketed worldwide across five generations.

Before 1993, the E suffix in Mercedes-Benz model names referred to Einspritzmotor (German for fuel injection engine) when in the early 1970s fuel injection began to proliferate beyond its upper-tier luxury and sporting models. By the launch of the facelifted W124 in 1993 fuel injection was ubiquitous in Mercedes engines, and the E was adopted as a prefix (i.e., E 220). The model line is referred to officially as the E-Class (or E-Klasse). All generations of the E-Class have offered either rear-wheel drive or Mercedes' 4Matic four-wheel drive system.

The E-Class is Mercedes-Benz' best-selling model, with more than 16 million sold by 2023. The first E-Class series was originally available as four-door sedan, five-door estate, two-door coupe and two-door convertible. From 1997 to 2009, the equivalent coupe and convertible were sold under the Mercedes-Benz CLK-Class nameplate; which was based on the mechanical underpinnings of the smaller C-Class while borrowing the styling and some powertrains from the E-Class, a trend continued with the C207 E-Class coupe/convertible which was sold parallel to the W212 E-Class sedan/wagon. With the latest incarnation of the E-Class released for the 2017 model year, all body styles share the same W213 platform.

Due to the E-Class's size and durability, it has filled many market segments, from personal cars to frequently serving as taxis in European countries, as well special-purpose vehicles (e.g., police or ambulance modifications) from the factory. In November 2020, the W213 E-Class was awarded the 2021 Motor Trend Car of the Year award, a first for Mercedes-Benz.

== History ==
Although the E-Class nomenclature was adopted in July 1993 for the second facelift of the Mercedes-Benz W124 as part of the company's wider rebranding programme that allocated all of its products into Classes, the product line of the mid-range cars traces decades before. Officially Mercedes-Benz recognising the importance of pre-WWII cars such as the W15 170, the W21 200 and in particular the Diesel powered W138 260D, retroactively applies the E-Class to 1946 when post WWII production was restarted on the W136 170V model, with passenger cars deliveries commencing July of 1947. Whilst many publications support this position others choose one of the more contemporary pre-1993 models among the predecessors.

The reason for this debate is that from as early as 1949 and until the early 1980s Mercedes-Benz production was centred on two distinct product lines of passenger cars based on their prestige. Differing primarily in the wheelbase, interior furnishing, external finish and the engines, the E-Class predecessors being represented by four cylinder engines, whilst the S-Class predecessors would be of eight cylinder motors. Six cylinder engines would often be shared.

De jure this separation took place in 1972, when the premium range was officially branded as the Sonderklasse and this was continued up until July 1993. The lower tier did not have its own brand, but was commonly referred to as the mid-range and the medium class (Mittlere klasse). What complicates the matter is that before 1972 and up until 1985 cars in both classes shared the same chassis, body shell, platform and much of the underpinnings. Whilst the 1972 separation coincided with the launch of the W116 S-Class, it was amid production of the W114/W115 'Stroke-8' which has been in production for four years since 1968, making it, in view of some the first true E-Class predecessor.

The preceding Ponton and Fintail generations are even more difficult to differentiate, as the top end six-cylinder models and the entry four cylinder diesels were literally built on the same body. Adding to this complication were the 'inter-class' models such as the lineup of the W105 219, W111 220 and W110 230 which replaced each other from 1956 until 1968, and the W111 230S which was produced in parallel with the new generation W108/W109 from 1965 until 1968. Both six cylinder models would eventually become a permanent fixture in the /8 (230.6 and 250, later 230.6 and 280) W123 (250 and 280) and W124 (260 and 300, later 280 and 320).

=== W120 (1953) ===
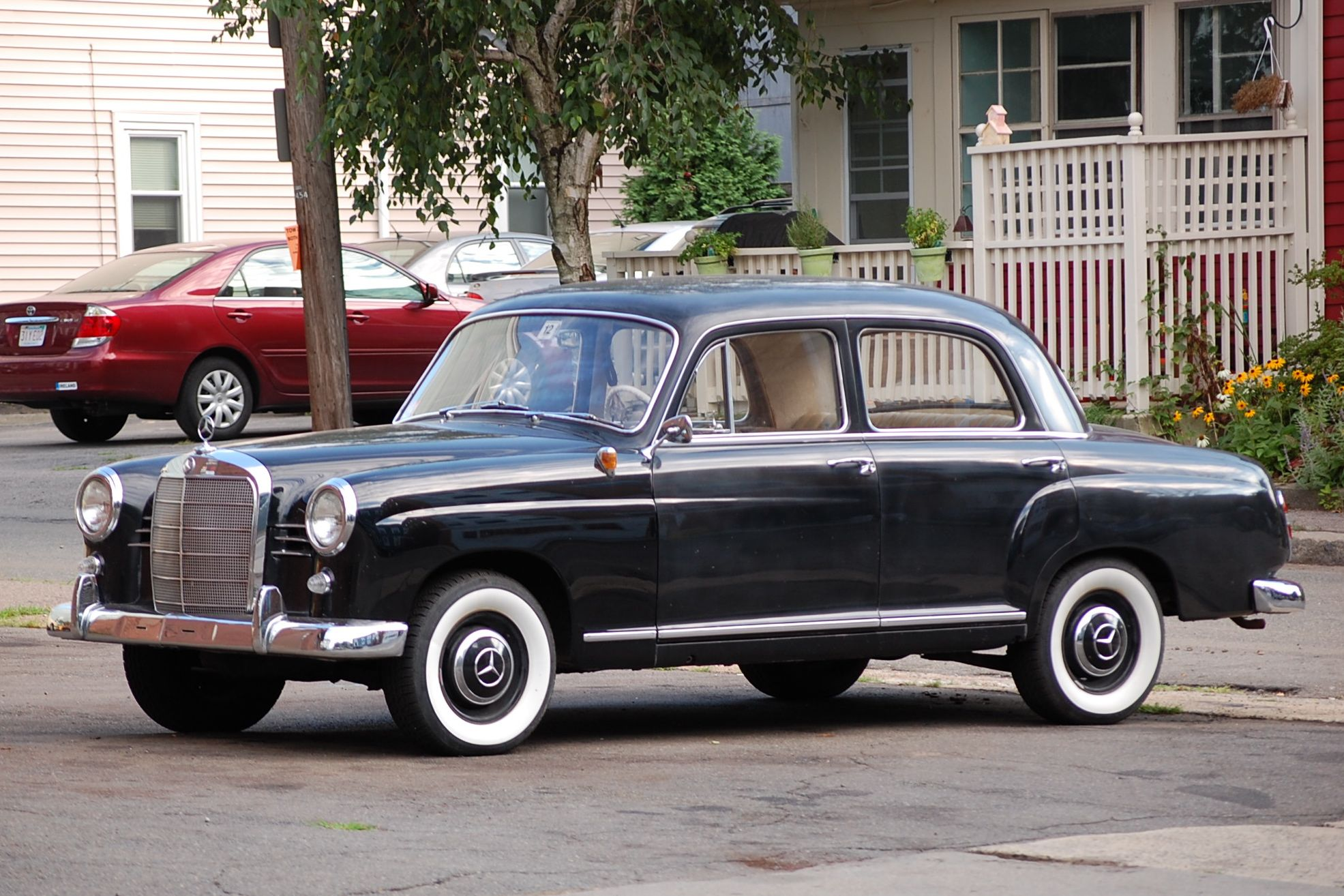
Mercedes 190D (W120)

The first modern midsize Mercedes was the W120 'Ponton' 180 of 1953 and was produced until 1962. Sharing its engineering with the R121 190 SL of 1955, the Ponton was a stylish sedan with a four-cylinder engine. An OHC engine W121 190 appeared in 1956 along with a six-cylinder Mercedes-Benz W105.

=== W110 (1961) ===
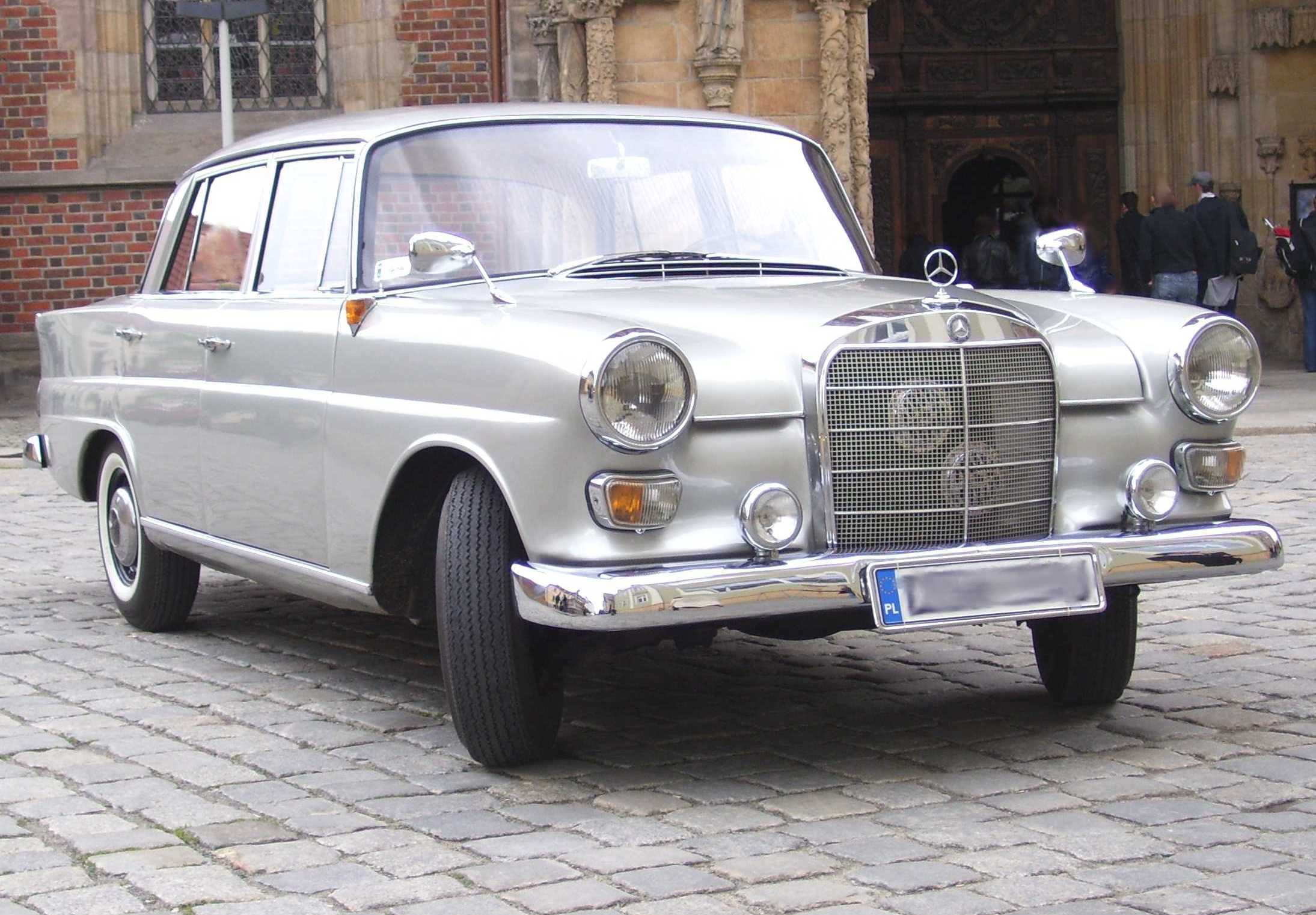
Mercedes Benz (W110)

Mercedes added tailfins to both the new W110 'Fintail' 190 of 1962. In the 1965 230 model a Straight-6 engine appeared for the first time, and the four-cylinder engine grew in displacement.

=== W114, W115 (1968) ===
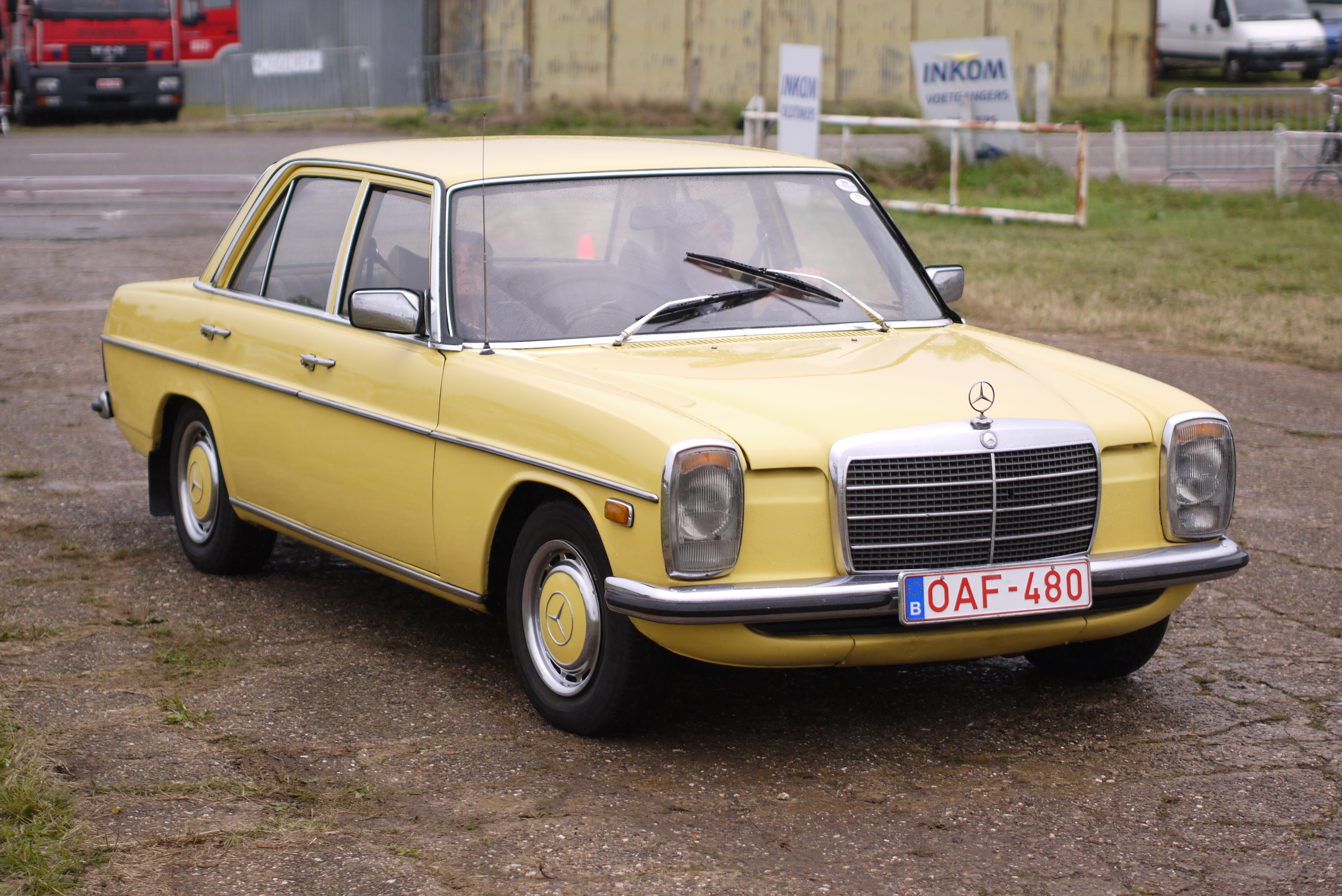
Mercedes-Benz (W115)

The midsize Mercedes was redesigned in 1968 as the W114/W115 'Stroke-8'. This time, the 6-cylinder models (The W114s) were most prevalent, with the W115 line making up the bottom of the company's offerings with four- and five-cylinder power. A coupé body joined the line-up in 1969, and was the first mid-range Mercedes to be offered with the D-Jetronic fuel injection.

=== W123 (1975) ===
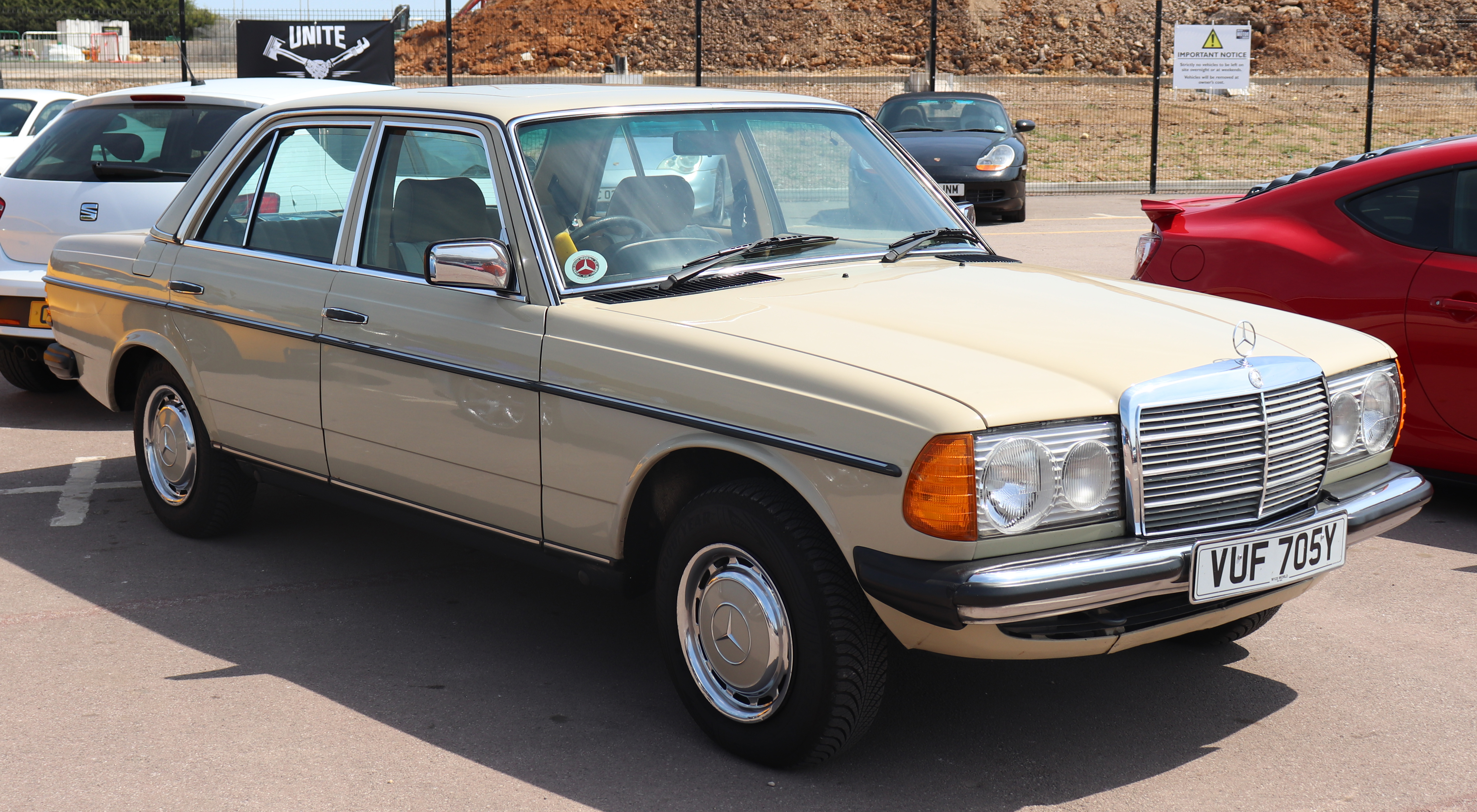
Mercedes-Benz (W123)

The popular W123 quickly became a best-seller on its launch in 1976. Especially in diesel powered 240D and 300D guises, the cars enhanced the company's reputation for product quality. Over 2.6 million were produced until the end of production in 1986. Saloon/Sedan, Coupé, and Estate body configurations were offered.

=== W124 (1984) ===
The W124 was presented in November 1984, with production commencing in January the following year. During its production it introduced many new features like the 4Matic all-wheel drive, DOHC cylinder heads and emission control with Catalytic converters, Diesel particulate filters and Exhaust gas recirculation. A special mention is the top end 500E performance vehicle co-built by Porsche. It was the third car to inherit the company's new design theme since the late 1970s, following the flagship W126 and compact W201.

Similar to its predecessors, the W124 also offered a coupé and estate body styles. A cabriolet (internally A124) was also available from 1992.

=== 1993 re-branding ===
To further complicate matters, the 1972-1993 Sonderklasse label was not limited to the W116 and W126 sedans, but also the R107 and R129 SL roadsters, the C107 and C126 coupes. Even the W100 limousine was listed among the S-Class. The unnamed mid-range would see itself balloon when in addition to the standard family of sedans it would be filled with coupes (W114 - 1969), estates (S123 - 1978), compact cars (W201 - 1982), high performance halo cars (190E 2.3-16; 500E) 4x4 off-roaders (W463 - 1989) and cabriolets (A124 - 1992).

Since 1972 Mercedes-Benz had two distinct product lines. The S-class premiere range, represented by the W116 and W126 sedans and the W107 and R129 two-door range; and the standard range (W114, W115, W123 and W124). This was then joined by the compact W201 190 series from 1982. The S (Sonder) suffix literally translates as "special" and is used in German language to denote a premium or more luxurious product. The nomenclature was loosely based on engine displacement. As a result, the hierarchy consisted of a set number of numerical series, across the engines shared within each series. Suffixes would further elaborate on specifics deemed necessary, be it the fuel system e.g. D – Diesel, E – Einspritz (injection); the body type: C – coupé, T – Transport (estate); or the car application: SL – sports; G – Gelände, off-road. Sometimes a combination of several suffices would be used. This made marketing increasingly difficult and very confusing. For example, the W201 was limited to being called 190 series, with engine fitment indicated by a separate number for displacement, e.g. the 190D 2.5 and 190E 2.6. Meanwhile, the W124, sharing these same engines would be named simply as the 250D and 260E, while the W463 and W126 also featuring one of these motors would be called the 250GD and 260SE respectively.

In spring 1993 Mercedes-Benz released the successor to the W201, and unlike the 190, which was initially seen as a sporty car appealing to the younger generation, the W202 was to be a fully fledged automobile for all age groups, with a range of engines and trims. For this Mercedes-Benz opted to create a third, entry, Compact or C-Class range. To prevent confusion with the Coupé suffix, the Class letter now preceded the displacement, e.g. "C180". Particulars of the engine's fuel system would be written out on the boot - Diesel, Turbodiesel. Petrol engines were by now all fuel injected and thus the E for Einspritzung suffix was deemed redundant.

In the first months of the W202's production, the branding was deemed successful and in August the whole range underwent a major re-branding creating several new Classes. In some cases, like on the W140 S-Class this was a formality of having the S suffix now become a prefix. The R129 SL became the SL-Class and this coincided with changing several engines and thus models. The G-wagen also became the G-class, and this made marketing easier as it allowed to bridge between the privately sold W463 and the commercially sold W461 models. This left only the W124 remaining in the unnamed Mercedes-Benz standard range.

As all of the petrol engines were now all fuel injected, and remaining the most commonly sold versions (particularly the 220E and 320E series), this made the E-suffix the most predominant on the W124. For this reason, Mercedes-Benz opted to re-christen its mid-range as the E-class and the models underwent the same re-badging as others.

== First generation (W124; 1993) ==
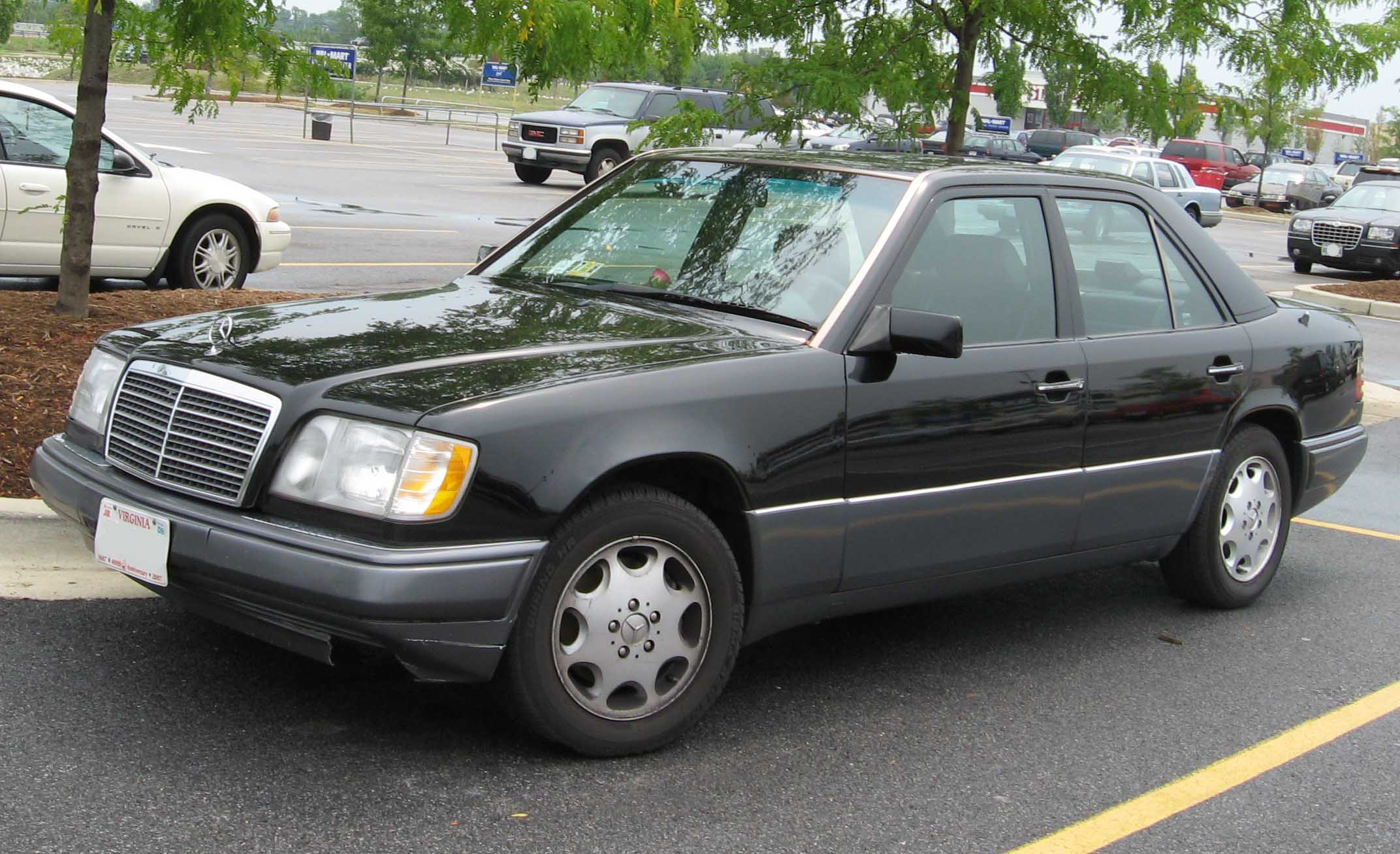
Mercedes-Benz W124 (sedan)

The "E-Class" name first appeared with the facelifted W124 in August 1993 for Europe and in September for 1994 model year for export into the United States. The W124 was introduced in 1984 but continued with the older naming convention until 1993 when all Mercedes-Benz models switched to a new system, e.g. E 320 instead of 320 E. Sedan (W124), Coupé (C124), Convertible (A124), and Estate (S124) body configurations were offered. Sedans were built through 1995, estates and coupes through 1996 and cabriolets finished in 1997.

== Second generation (W210; 1995) ==
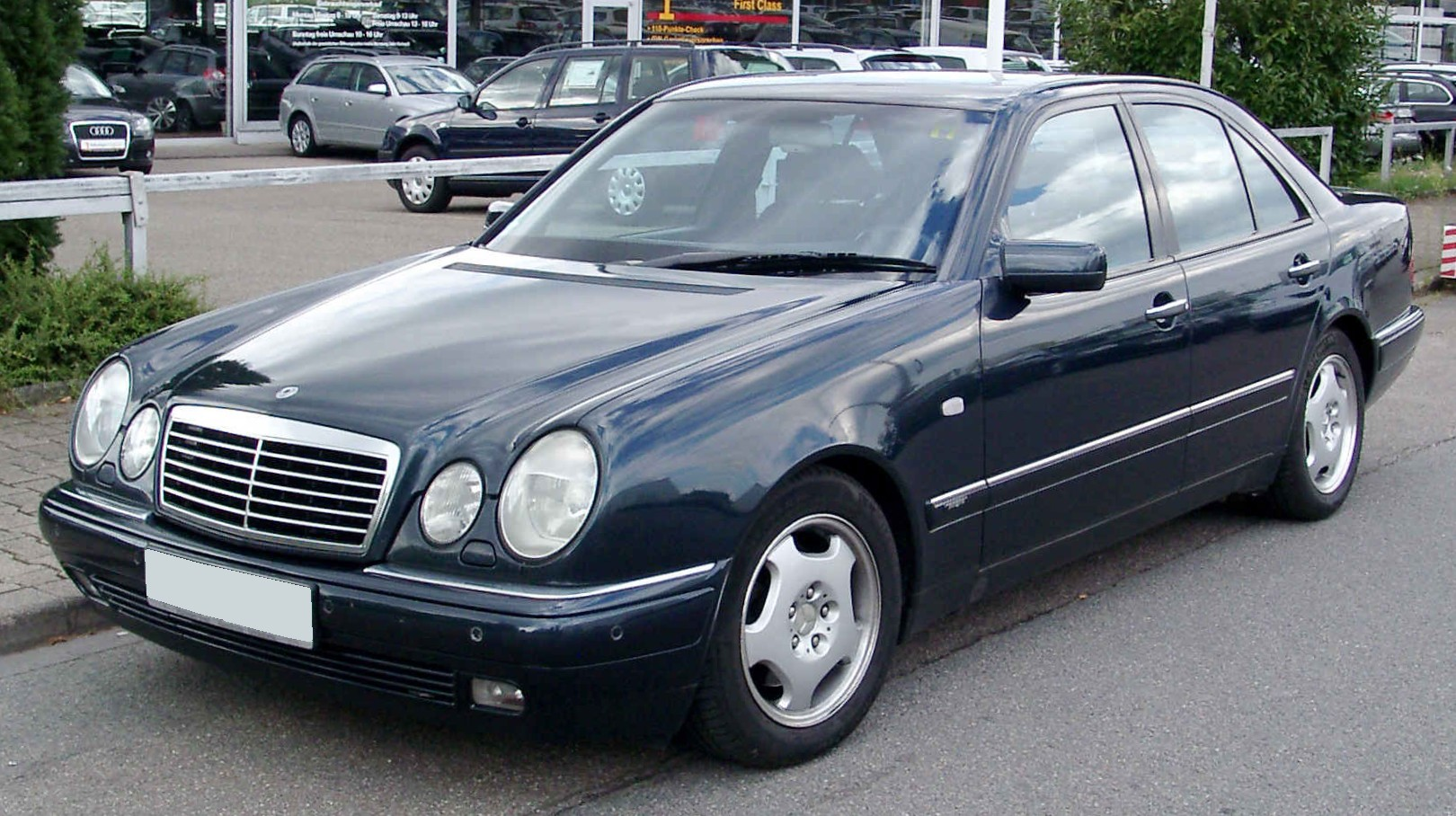
Mercedes-Benz W210

The W210 E-Class launched in January 1995.

The W210 made major changes compared to the earlier version of the E-class, including four large oval headlights, which gave Mercedes an updated image intended to attract more younger buyers and women. The new E-Class was 1.6 in (4.1 cm) longer and 2.3 in (5.8 cm) wider and offered significantly more interior room but was still considered mid-size.

In September 1999, the W210 E-class was facelifted. This included visual, mechanical, and quality improvements over the earlier versions.

The Mercedes-Benz E-Class was Motor Trend's Import Car of the Year for 1996.

While the W210 sedan was replaced by the W211 in 2002, the wagon version continued to be sold until March 2003 when the S211 wagon returned the S210 wagon.

== Third generation (W211; 2001) ==
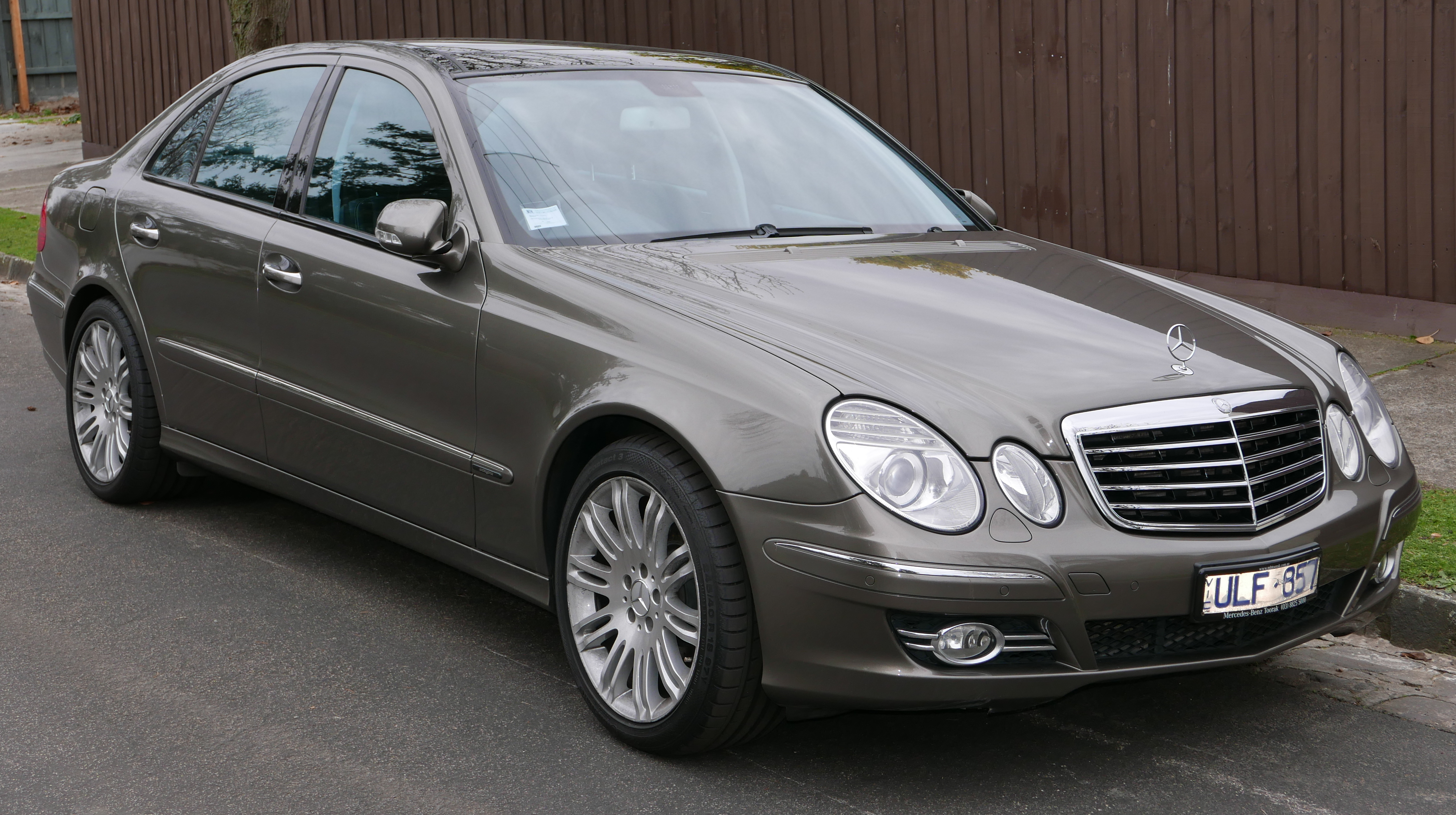
Mercedes-Benz W211

Launched in 2002, the W211 E-Class was another evolution of the previous model.

The W211-based C219 CLS-Class 4-door coupe was introduced as a niche model in 2005, primarily to attract a younger demographic.

The W211 E-Class was facelifted in June 2006 for the 2007 model year to address quality and technical issues raised by earlier models, Sensotronic was dropped, while Pre-Safe (w/o brake support) was made standard. The largest factory-built engine in the E-class range is the E500, which had its engine size increased from 5 liters to 5.5 liters in 2006 along with the facelift. There are also AMG models badged E55 and E63, AMG as well as other tuning house installations.

== Fourth generation (W212; 2009) ==
=== Sedan and wagon (W212) ===
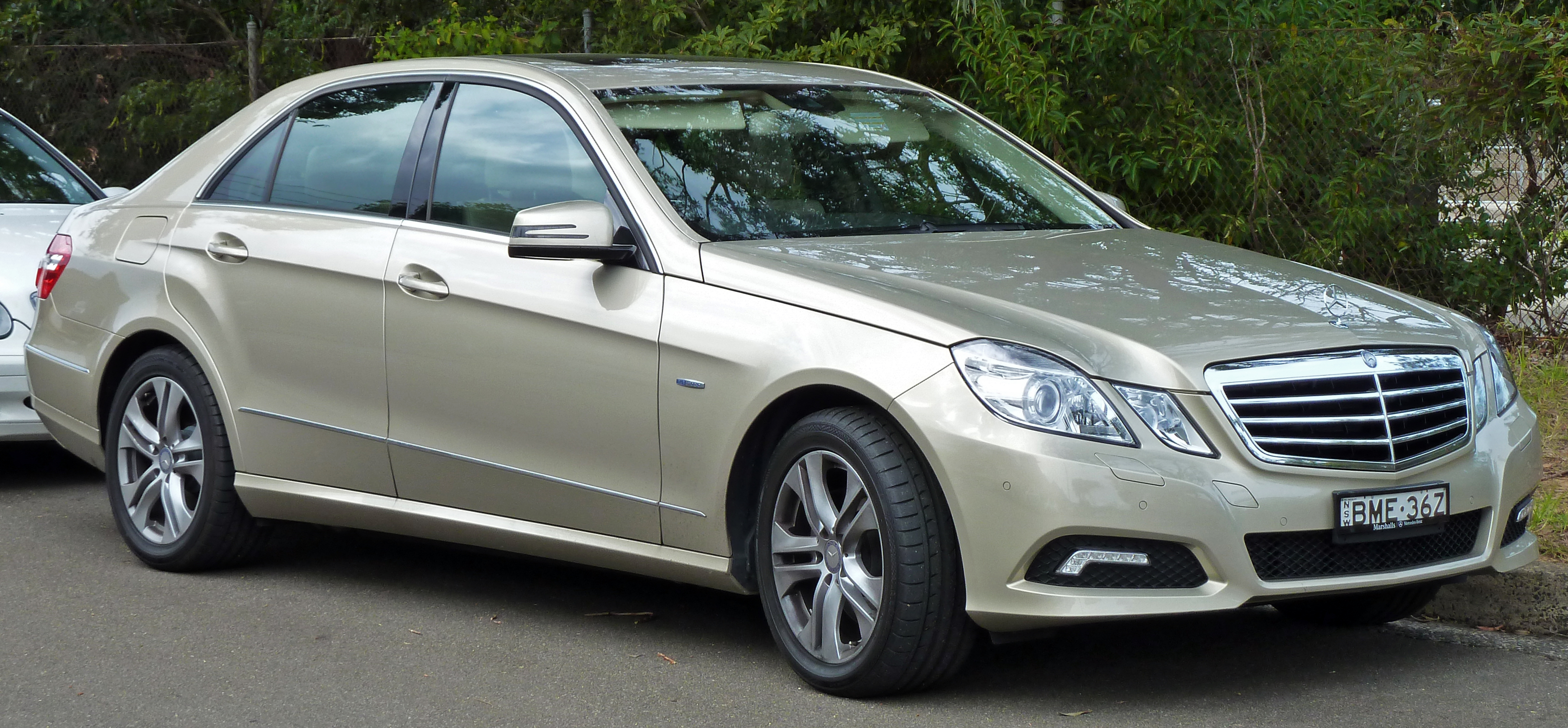
Mercedes-Benz E 250 (W212)

The W212 replaced the W211 in 2009 (as a 2010 model). Official photos of the W212 were leaked on the internet on 9 December 2008 ahead of its 2009 Geneva Motor Show unveiling. Scans of a leaked brochure were posted onto the internet in January 2009, detailing the whole E-Class range including the new E 200 CGI and E 230 CGI with direct injected forced induction engines. New features included a blind spot monitor, Lane Keeping Assist, Pre-safe with Attention Assist, and Night View Assist Plus. In the United States the E-Class was priced nearly US$4,600 less than the previous model. The W212 estate was also announced and available from November 2009.

In 2013, the E-Class had a comprehensive facelift, featuring significant styling changes, fuel economy improvements, and updated safety features. Daimler invested close to €1 billion into the development of the extensive refresh, making it likely the most expensive mid-life facelift in the history of the automobile. The biggest change was the singular front lights replacing the twin headlamp design (marking the end of Mercedes's dual headlamps use) with integrated LED DRLs. Although not an all-new model, the W212 facelift was the only mid-cycle refresh featured on a family portrait of several generations of the E-Class side by side by Mercedes-Benz for the unveiling of the W213 E-Class. The E63 "S" AMG model is rated at 577 HP/585 PS power and 590 lb-ft/800 Nm torque, although there is significant real-world dynamometer testing indicating this model exceeds 600 HP/608 PS power at the engine's flywheel.

=== Coupe and convertible (C207/A207) ===
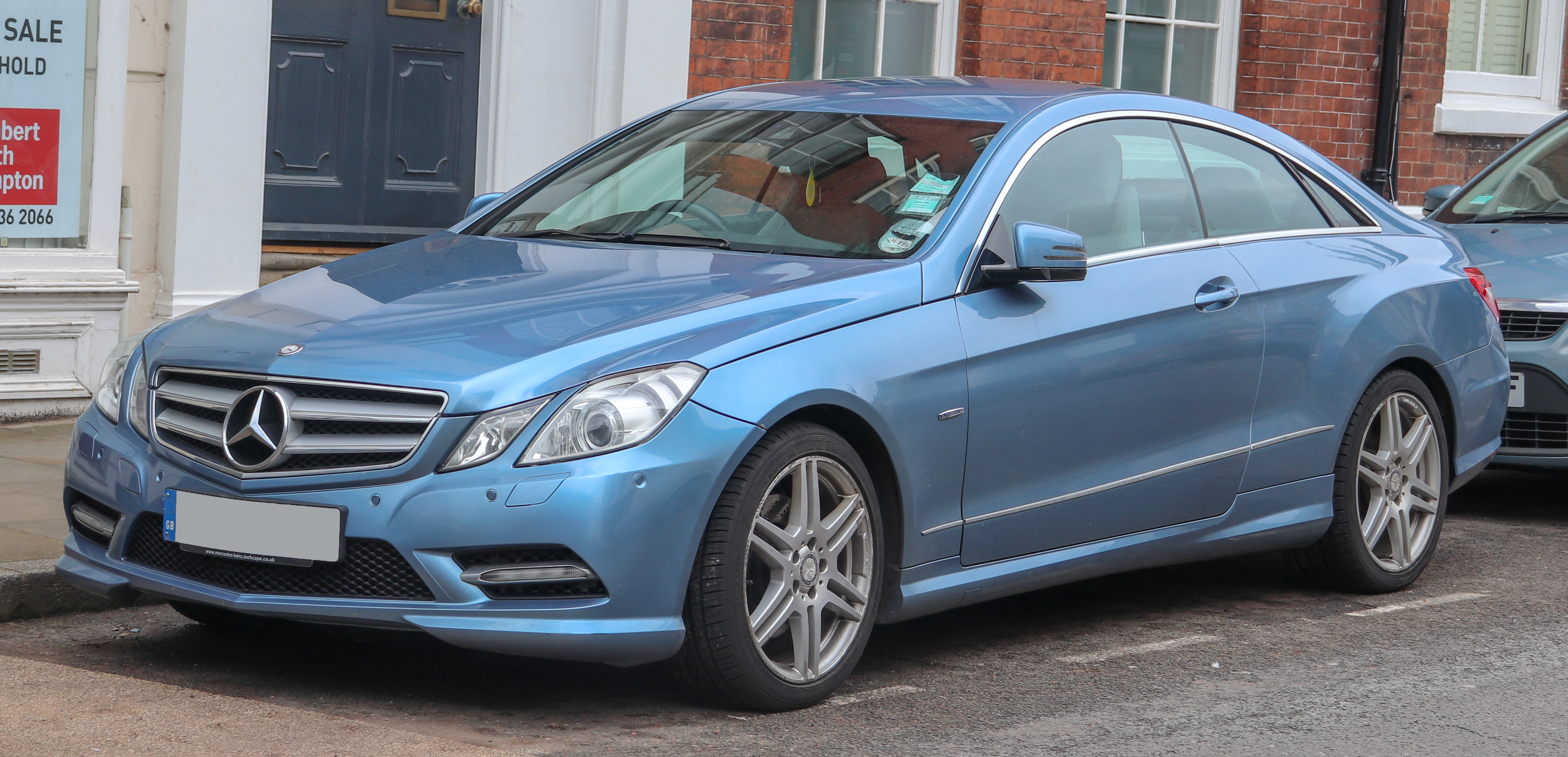
Mercedes-Benz E 250 Sport CDi BlueEFFICIENCY (UK; C207)

The coupé (C207) was first shown at the 2009 Geneva Motor Show, while the convertible (A207) was unveiled at the 2010 North American International Auto Show. Both models replaced the previous C209/A209 CLK-Class models. The C207/A207 E-Class is based on the W204 C-Class platform, and is produced alongside each other in the Bremen plant.

== Fifth generation (W213; 2016) ==
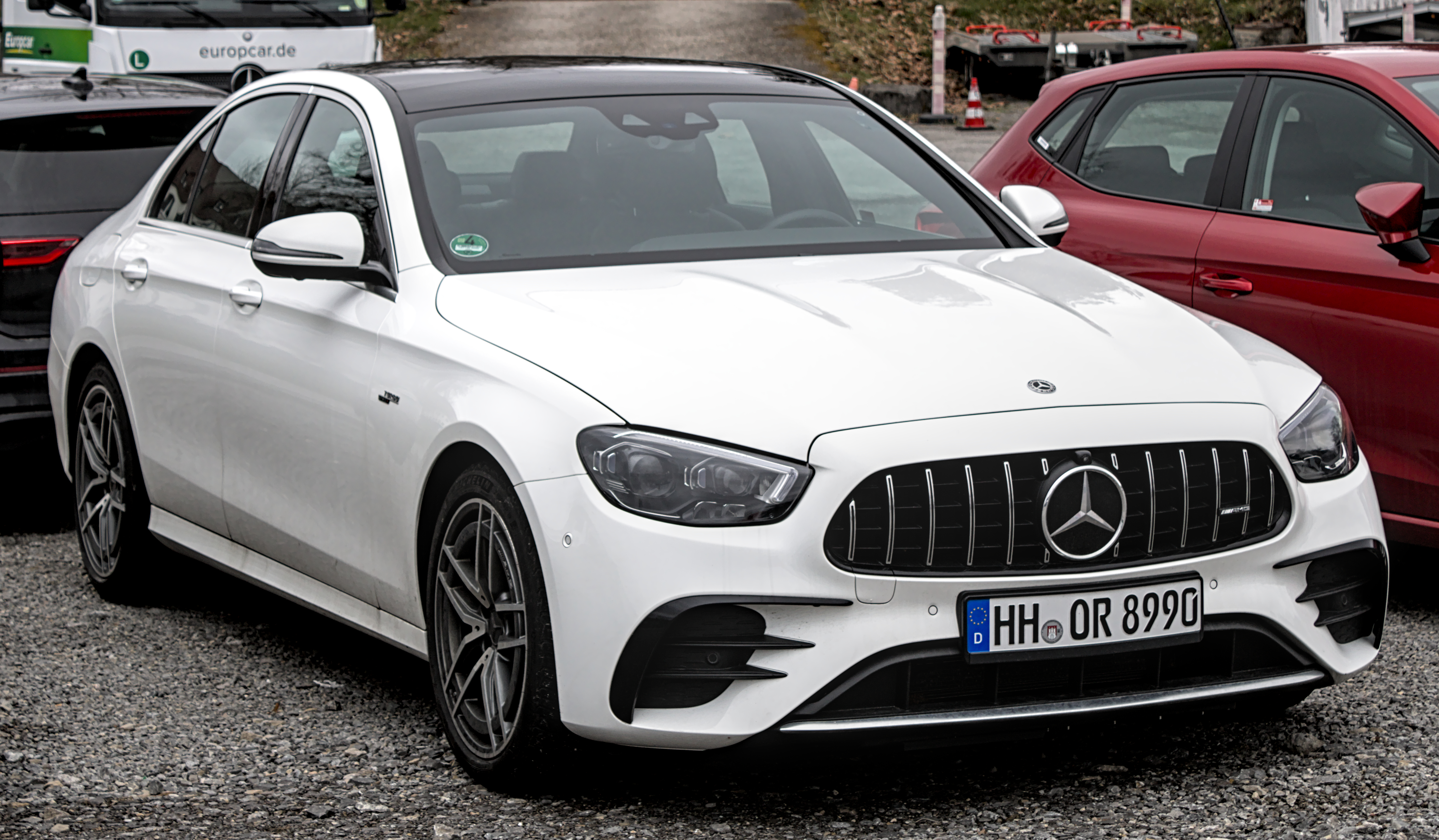
Mercedes-AMG E53 (W213 facelift)

The fifth generation E-Class was unveiled at the 2016 North American International Auto Show. This generation E-Class has design cues from the larger W222 S-Class and the smaller W205 C-Class. While the W212 E-Class has tighter surface and harder edges, the new model is curvier and more flowing.

Engine options for the W213 E-Class saw a major update, switching back to inline six-cylinder engines from the previous V6 engines, along with a new generation of four-cylinder diesel engines, codenamed OM654, while retaining existing four-cylinder petrol engines.

The W213 E-Class is the second-most technologically advanced Mercedes after the new S-Class. The E-Class received the latest in autonomous driving technology for use at highway speeds, capable of piloting itself up to speeds of 130 mph (210 km/h) for up to 2 minutes. The system uses a complex array of motion sensors, radars, and cameras to scan the road ahead, and requires the driver's hands to be placed on the wheel at all times. This feature was also available on the fourth-generation Mercedes-AMG E 63 model.

In 2020, Mercedes-Benz introduced a facelift to the W213.

== Sixth generation (W214; 2023) ==
Mercedes-Benz E 200d (W214)

The sixth generation E-Class debuted on April 25, 2023. Body styles include the saloon and estate (wagon), while coupés and convertibles were discontinued. As part of a consolidation of model ranges, executive coupés and convertibles will slot between the E-Class and C-Class in size under the new CLE nameplate.

== Production and sales ==
Year	Production (sedan/estate/coupe/convertible)	Sales				
Year	Production (sedan/estate/coupe/convertible)	U.S.	Europe	China (Note: 2011–2014, 2023–2025 China sales only include locally produced versions, exclude imported versions.)		
Year	Production (sedan/estate/coupe/convertible)	U.S.	Europe	ICE	PHEV	Total
2001		44,445	128,208			
2002		42,598	156,317			
2003		55,683	191,809			
2004		58,954	171,071			
2005		50,383	125,348			
2006		50,195	110,494			
2007		48,950	109,872			
2008		38,576	77,661			
2009		43,072	100,947			8,200
2010	323,200 (208,400 / 44,400 / 49,600 / 20,800)	60,922	139,192			40,760
2011	338,386	62,736	129,963			44,738
2012	310,408	65,171	98,142			36,385
2013		69,803	106,559			36,836
2014	(257,571 / - / - )	66,400	99,565			43,708
2015	232,453	55,888	84,771			57,853
2016	304,200	50,896	99,494			57,439
2017		51,312	127,638			113,431
2018		46,422	117,906			146,032
2019		40,113	107,453			157,504
2020		27,102	70,171			149,900
2021		20,947	53,654			142,216
2022		18,818	39,782			140,802
2023		17,782		148,149	13,832	161,981
2024		17,638		132,425	4,777	137,202
2025				120,735	10,830	131,565
