= W37 =

W37 may refer to:

- German minesweeper Diana (W37)
- Mercedes-Benz W37, a light van
- Shiokari Station, in Hokkaido, Japan
- XW-37, an American nuclear warhead design
- Yinjibarndi language
