= Mercedes-Benz W02 =

Mercedes-Benz Typ 8/38 PS / Typ Stuttgart 200 (W 02)
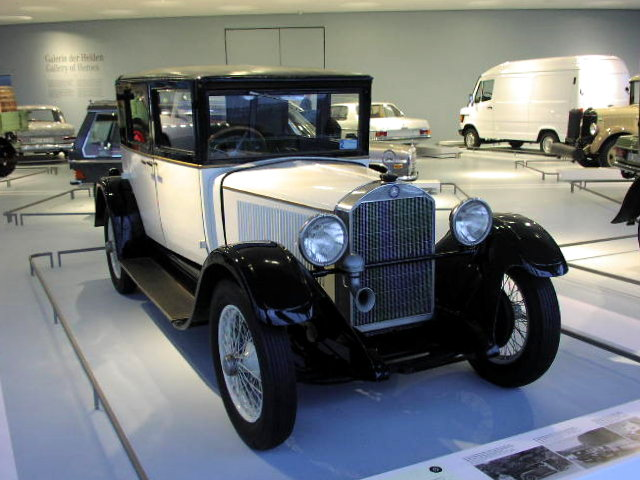
- Mercedes-Benz 8/38 PS (1927)

Overview
- Manufacturer: Daimler-Benz AG
- Also called: Mercedes-Benz 8/38 PS (1926–1933); Mercedes-Benz Typ Stuttgart 200 (1929–1933); Mercedes-Benz W02 (1929–1933)
- Production: 1926–1933; 16,956 built
- Assembly: Germany: Stuttgart,

Body and chassis
- Body style: Torpedo-bodied "Tourenwagen"; 2- & 4-door "Limousine" (sedan/saloon); Cabriolets
- Layout: FR layout

Powertrain
- Engine: 1,988 cc In line six-cylinder sidevalve engine

Dimensions
- Wheelbase: 2,810 mm (111 in)
- Length: 4,060 mm (160 in) - 4,375 mm (172.2 in)
- Width: 1926–1929: 1,680 mm (66 in); 1929–1933: 1,710 mm (67 in)
- Height: 1,800 mm (71 in)

The Mercedes-Benz W02 was a midsize six-cylinder two-litre-engined automobile introduced by Daimler-Benz at the Berlin Motor Show in October 1926. It was developed in some haste under the manufacturer's Technical Director, Ferdinand Porsche in parallel with the smaller Mercedes-Benz W 01 (which never progressed beyond the prototype stage) and the larger three-litre-engined Mercedes-Benz W03 following the creation of Daimler-Benz, formally on June 28 1926, from the fusion of the Daimler and Benz & Cie auto-businesses.

The new company's models for 1926 were unencumbered by an excess of technical sophistication, but came from a company with a long-standing reputation for quality: serious teething problems afflicting the early cars were the focus of conflict between Daimler-Benz Chairman, Wilhelm Kissel and the Technical Director responsible for the new models: Porsche's employment contract was not renewed beyond 1928, which led to acrimonious litigation.

== Naming conventions ==
The manufacturer applied the widely followed German naming conventions of the time. On the Mercedes-Benz 8/38 PS the "8" defined the car's tax horsepower, used by the authorities to determine the level of annual car tax to be imposed on car owners. The "38" defined the manufacturer's claims regarding car's actual power output as defined in Horsepower#Metric horsepower (PS, cv, hk, pk, ks, ch). In Germany tax horsepower, which had been defined by statute since 1906, was based on the dimensions of the cylinders in the engine.

Unlike the systems used elsewhere in Europe, the German tax horsepower calculation took account both of the cylinder bore and of the cylinder stroke, and there was therefore a direct linear relationship between engine size and tax horsepower.

The model was effectively relaunched in 1929, and although there were not many changes on paper, the car was now more modern and cultivated, thanks to the attentions of Hans Nibel, who from January 1929, newly appointed as Technical Director, held sole responsibility for model development. The relaunch was accompanied by a new name, and the car was now sold as the Mercedes-Benz Typ Stuttgart 200.

In retrospect the car is sometimes referred to by its company works number, as the Mercedes-Benz W02, which minimises the risk of confusion with other Mercedes-Benz models with names similar to "Mercedes-Benz Typ 200".

== Mercedes-Benz Typ 8/38 PS (1926–1928) ==
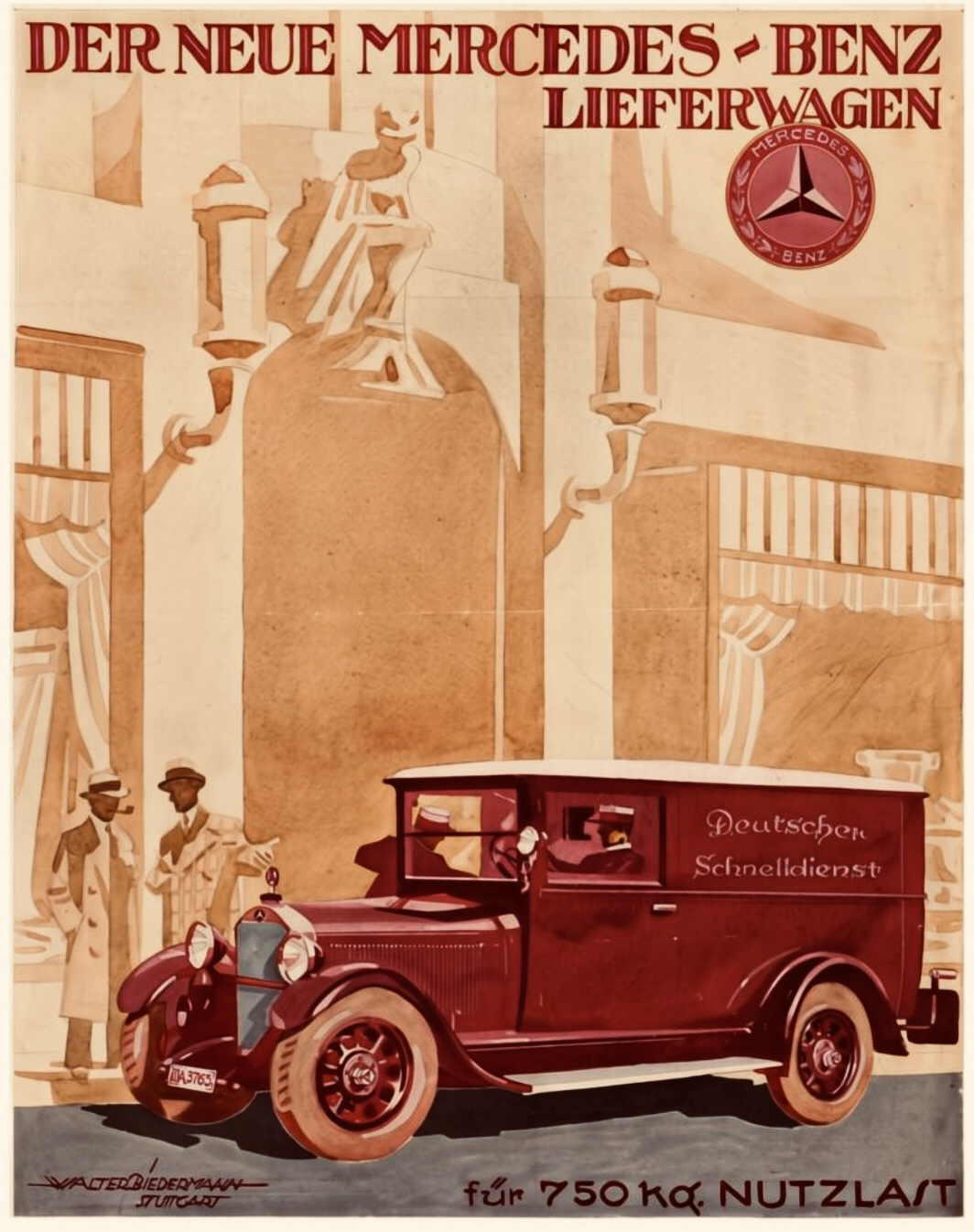
Mercedes W02 Typ L 3/4 (1927-1928)

The car was offered in bare chassis form for customers wishing to purchase a car body from an independent coach builder. Standard bodies from the manufacturer started with a Torpedo-bodied "Tourenwagen" and included 2 or 4-door "Limousine" (sedan/saloon) bodies. There was also a choice from (initially) two different Mercedes-Benz cabriolet bodies.

The side-valve six-cylinder 1,988 cc engine delivered a maximum output of 38 PS (28 kW; 37 hp) at 3,400 rpm, which translated into a top speed of 75 km/h (47 mph). Power was transmitted via a three-speed manual transmission to the rear wheels, which were fixed to a rigid axle suspended from semi-elliptic leaf springs. The braking applied to all four wheels, mechanically controlled using rod linkages.

From 1927 a small delivery van version branded as the Mercedes-Benz Lieferwagen Typ L 3/4 was offered, intended either as a load carrier or, with ten seats, as a small bus.

During its early years the manufacturer pursued an inappropriate pricing strategy. Initially the prices were set much too high, and when they were reduced by between 500 and 1,000 Marks, which fed a rumour that the model was about to be replaced and existing cars were being priced as "run-out" models. This was part of the backdrop to the boardroom conflicts that led to the departure of Technical Director Porsche at the end of 1928.

== Mercedes-Benz 8/38 PS Typ Stuttgart 200 (1929–1933) ==
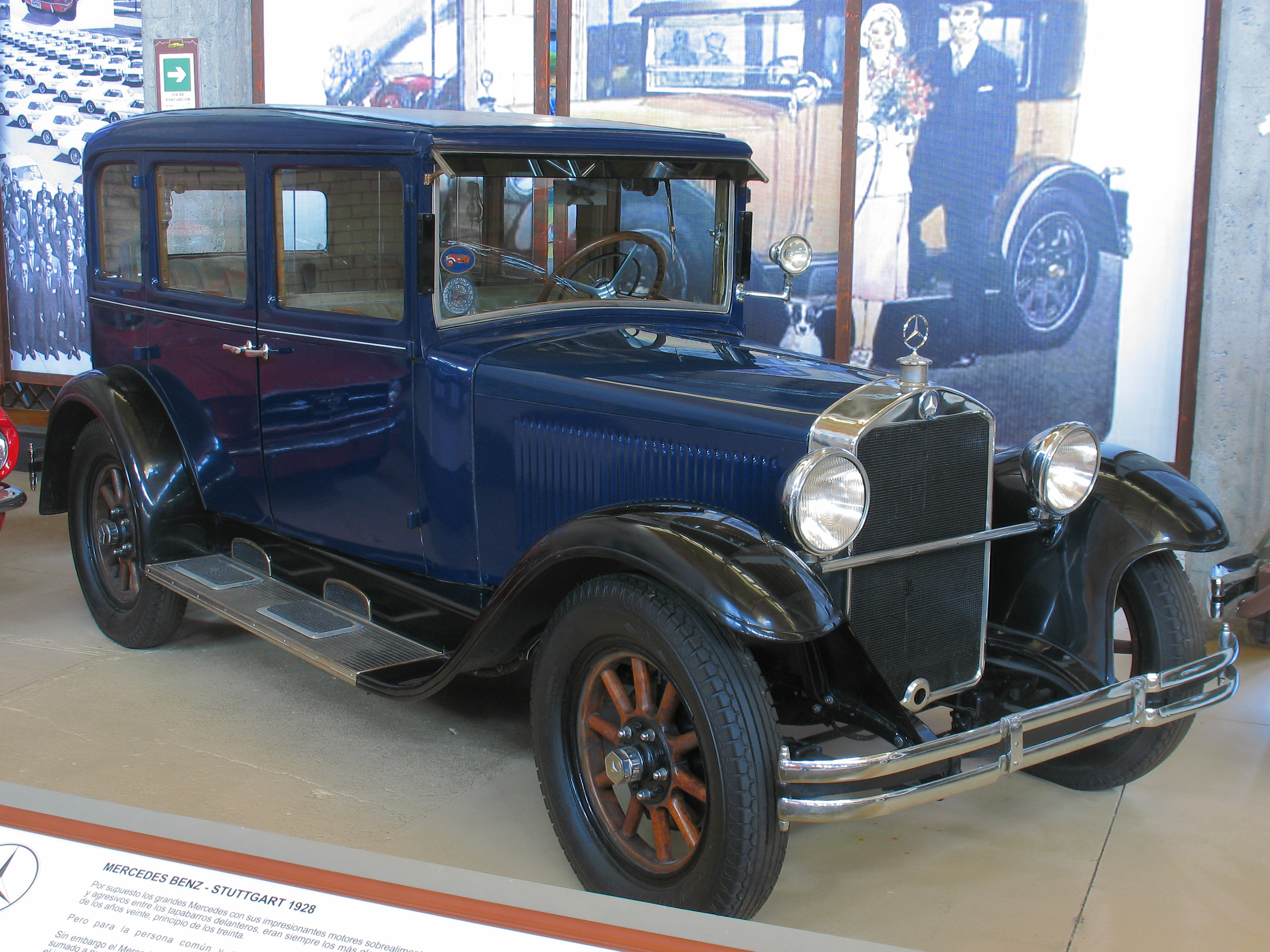
Mercedes-Benz Typ Stuttgart 200 (1928)

The relaunched car, now branded as the "Mercedes-Benz Typ Stuttgart 200" retained the 1,988 cc side-valve engine fitted the previous year. Claimed maximum output was also unchanged at 38 PS (28 kW; 37 hp). However, this level of output was now achieved at a slightly reduced engine speed of only 3,200 rpm. The compression ratio was substantially raised from 5 : 1 to 6.2 : 1, and the carburetor type (though apparently not its diameter) was changed from a "Zenith 30 HKG" to a "Solex 30 MOHLT".

The three-speed transmission was available as before, but customers could now also specify a four-speed manual transmission. The lower ratios were unchanged, and the same on both the gearboxes now offered, the fourth speed on the four-speed box being effectively an overdrive ratio of 1 : 0.76 while the more conventional "top" 1 : 1 ratio was achieved, as before, by selecting third gear. The combined impact of these engine and transmission changes enabled the manufacturer to increase the listed top speed to 80 km/h (50 mph) though at this time actual achievable top speed would have depended on a number of variables including the body type used.

The delivery van option was no longer listed for the Typ 200, and the two-door version of the "Limousine"-bodied car also disappeared with this upgrade, but the four-door "Limousine", now priced at only 80 Marks above the entry level Torpedo-bodied "Tourenwagen"-bodied car, remained as the mainstay of the range. 1929 also saw the introduction of the Mercedes-Benz W11, which in effect was virtually the same car, but offered with a larger engine and a wider range of body options.

Between 1927 and 1931 the "8/38 PS / Typ Stuttgart 200" and the more powerful but broadly similar "Typ Stuttgart 260" were the mainstays of the Mercedes-Benz range. The period was a particularly difficult one for the German auto industry, with passenger car sales badly depressed. The 4,788 cars produced in 1927 represented 61% of the manufacturer's output. Corresponding figures for the next five years (excluding van and military versions) are:

1928: 3,938 cars / 63%,
1929: 5,640 cars / 56%,
1930: 4,453 cars / 69%,
1931: 2,320 cars / 70%,
1932: 885 cars / 15%

(1932 saw the launch of the all-new and smaller W15 model. )

Production of the 1,988 cc Mercedes Benz 8/38 PS / W02 ended with a trickle in 1933, by which time 16,956 had been produced. (If the volumes are combined with those for the more powerful W11 the total comfortably exceeds 20,000.) The replacement W21 model was introduced in 1933, by which year the auto industry faced a much less bleak immediate-term outlook.

Not included with these passenger car statistics are "Kübelwagen" (quasi-Jeep) versions of the model, which continued to be produced until 1936.

== Sources and further reading ==
- Werner Oswald: Mercedes-Benz Personenwagen 1886–1986. 4. Auflage. Motorbuch Verlag Stuttgart (1987). ISBN 3-613-01133-6, S. 46–47
- Halwart Schrader: Deutsche Autos 1885–1920. Motorbuch Verlag Stuttgart (2002). ISBN 3-613-02211-7, S. 67
- Oswald, Werner (2001). Deutsche Autos 1920-1945, Band (vol) 2 (in German). Motorbuch Verlag. ISBN 3-613-02170-6.

This entry incorporates information from the equivalent German Wikipedia entry.
