= Mercedes-Benz taxi =

Motor vehicle

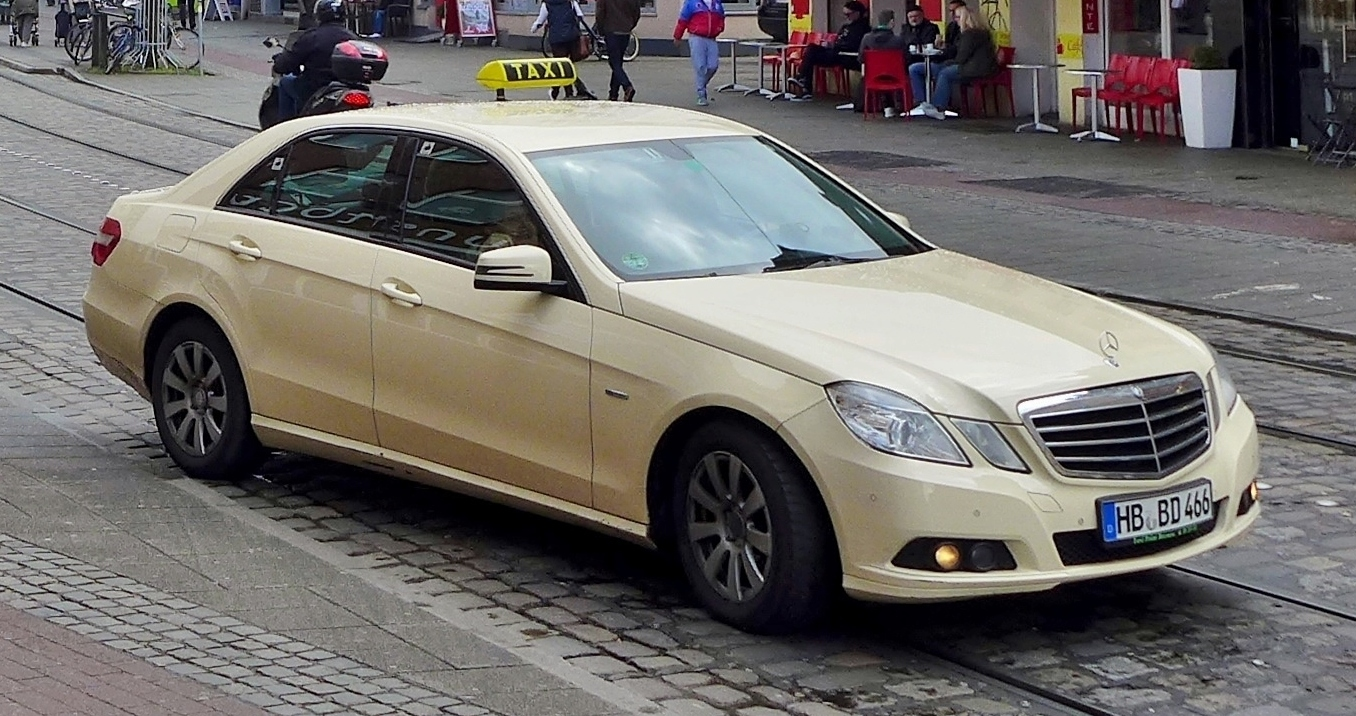
An ivory W212 E-class taxi in Germany

Mercedes-Benz is a popular brand of taxi in numerous countries worldwide. Some countries, such as Morocco, imported thousands of Mercedes-Benz taxi vehicles during the 1990s and as many as 55,000 were known to still be in use as of 2014. Mercedes offers specially configured vehicles designed for use as taxis as new from the factory.

== History ==
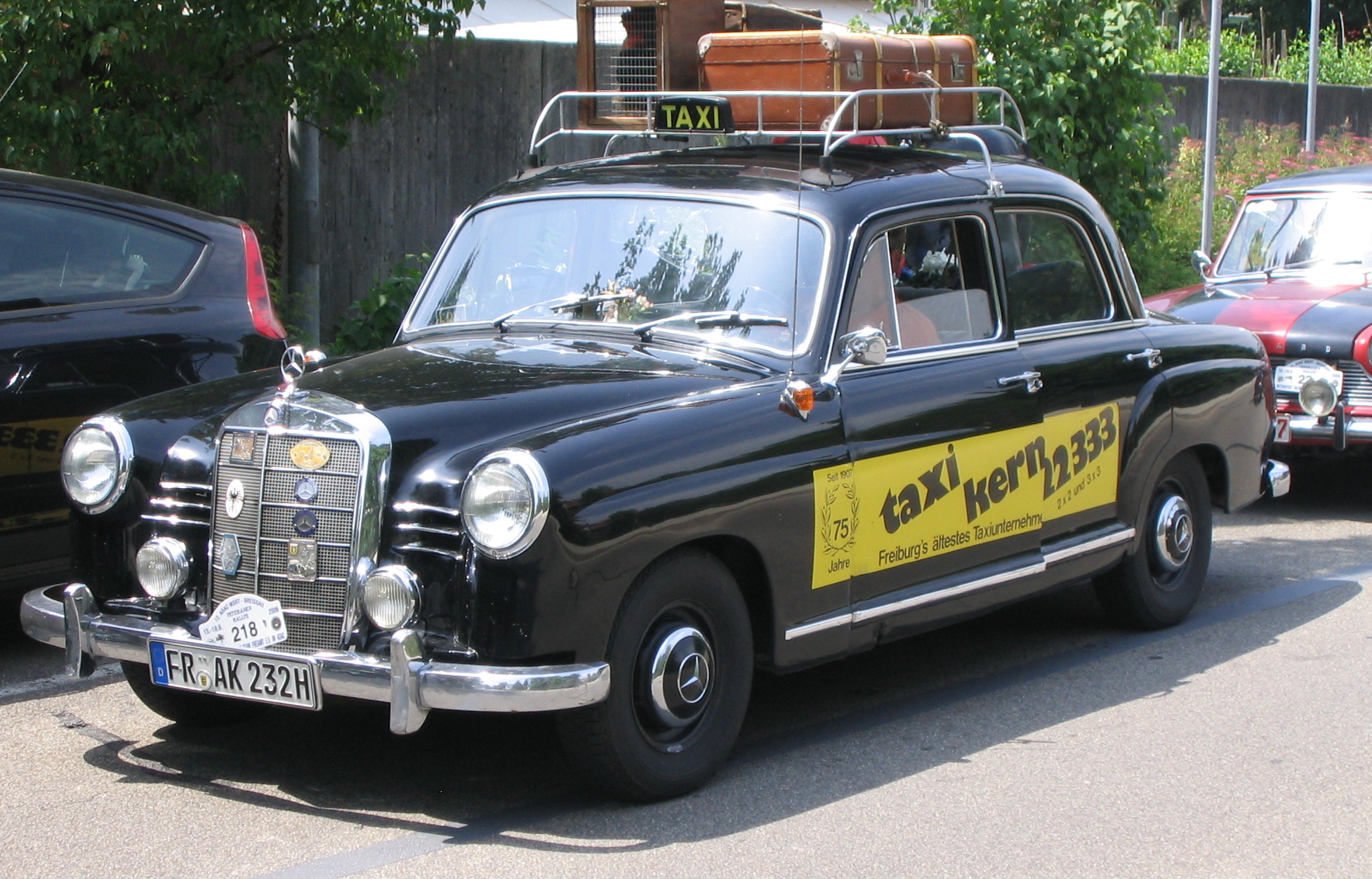
A classic Mercedes taxi in Germany

The first Mercedes-Benz branded taxi was launched in 1927, offered in an 8/38 horsepower model. The brand was also groundbreaking for diesel model taxis, with their 260 D model in 1936 being the first standard-production diesel passenger car to be available worldwide, leading to Mercedes-Benz developing an exclusive taxi package for their taxicab vehicles. Future models proved very popular in the taxicab industry, putting Mercedes-Benz amongst the leaders of taxi manufacturers worldwide.

In 2017, Mercedes-Benz pledged to release a self-driving taxi by the end of the following 3 years. Trials began in May 2020 as a joint venture with Bosch.

== Distribution ==
=== German homeland ===
In the homeland of Germany, the brand has traditionally been the first choice for taxi drivers. A renowned model of taxi was the Mercedes-Benz W123, which was offered in a special taxi specification from the beginning. Mercedes offered modifications to their taxi vehicles which included ivory paint, modified dashboard to take a taximeter, additional interior lights and hardened seats to withstand heavy use. Today, W123 models in good condition are at risk of being stolen for export to Africa where they are considered quintessential for a taxi.

Mercedes-Benz commanded a share of around 80% of the market during the 1990s, although by 2005, this had fallen below 50% due to sub-standard models coupled with rust and electrical issues. Between July 2004 and July 2005, Mercedes only just managed to sell more taxicabs (4,500) than Volkswagen (4,000), despite offering favourable financial incentives and a 20% discount, although delivery waiting times were believed to be off-putting at six months. By 2014, their market share had improved slightly, with around 60% of taxicabs in the Mercedes marque at an average age of 3.5 years.

The dominance of Mercedes in the German taxicab industry is believed to have made it difficult for Uber to compete in the country's market, given that they cannot realistically offer their customers better cars than those already available to the public. Jaguar attempted to compete with Mercedes-Benz's dominance in 2018 by delivering 10 I-Pace electric SUV to the largest taxi firm in Munich, chosen due to the poor air quality in the city.

=== Elsewhere in Europe ===
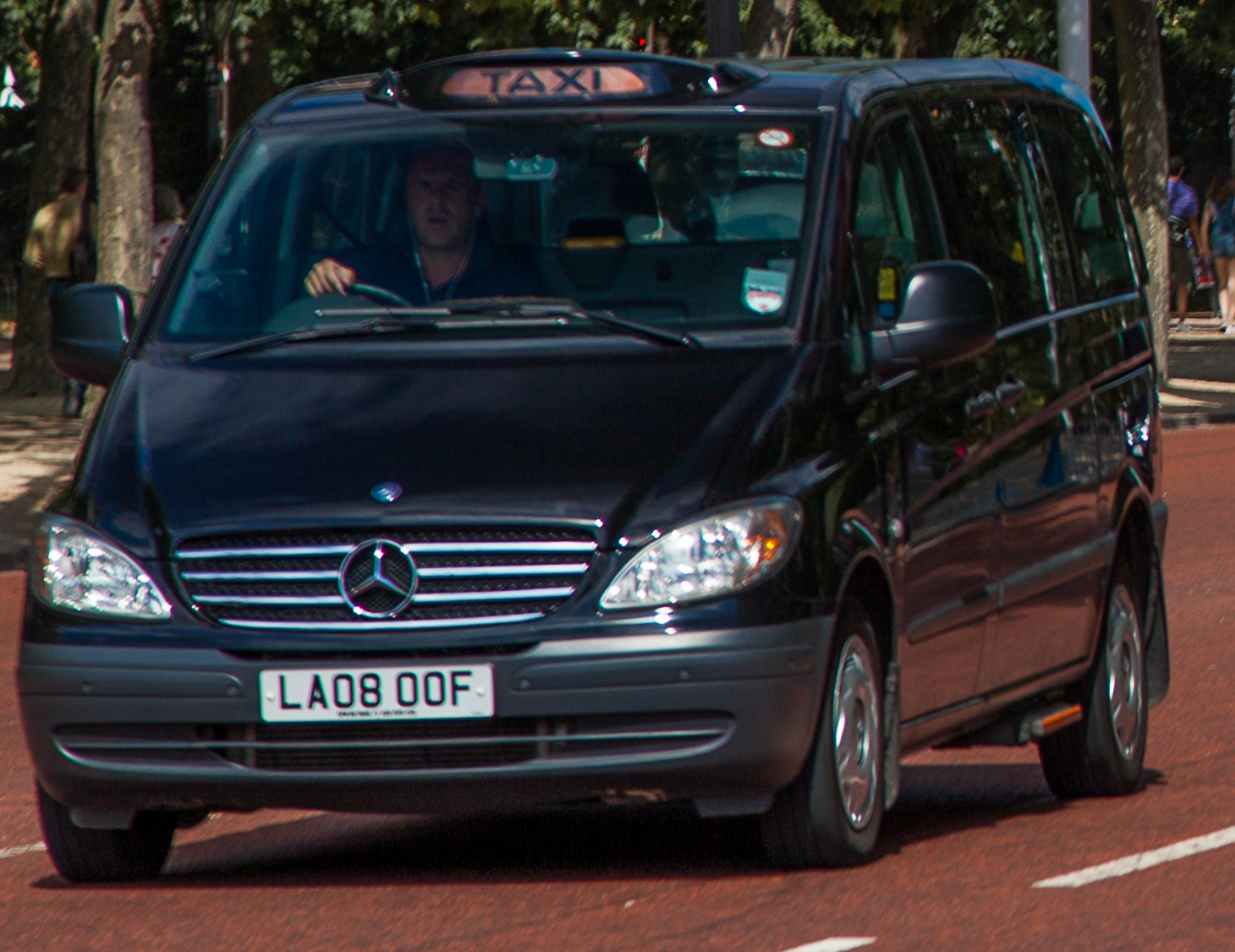
Vito taxi in London, United Kingdom

In August 2008, a variant of the Mercedes-Benz Vito was approved by the Public Carriage Office for use as a licensed London Hackney carriage. By September 2009, the Vito was reported to have secured 25% of the market, with 400 sales over the previous 12 months and forecasts that it could surpass sales of the traditional Hackney carriage TX4. Eco City's taxi trading firm said at that time, it was selling four of the £35,000 Vito vehicles for every Hackney TX4 carriage. Despite the high sales, in a poll conducted by the London Evening Standard in September 2011, 75% of participants said they did not prefer the Eco City Mercedes taxis to the traditional black cabs. Mercedes-Benz taxis were reported to be used for prisoner transportation in London during 2003, citing the increased reliability and being more cost effective.

In 2014, almost a quarter of Mercedes-Benz passenger car sales in Denmark was to the taxi industry, although newer tax regulations on cars being sold were expected to have an impact on those choosing the manufacturer. As well as previous tax incentives, the manufacturer also offered unique service arrangements and speedy delivery of parts at their workshops.

=== Worldwide ===
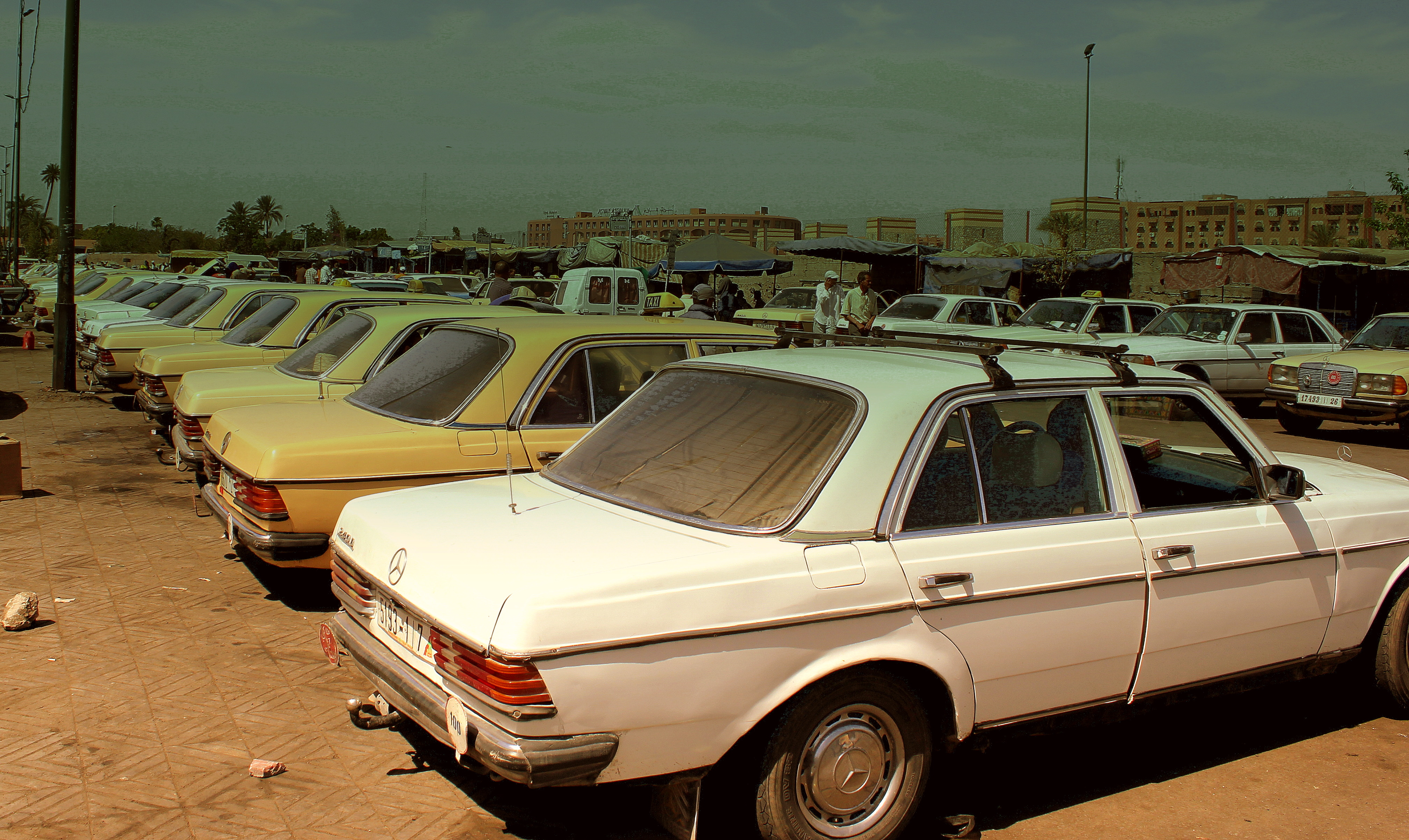
Taxis in Morocco, April 2013

In Morocco, the backbone of the taxi sector is served by Mercedes-Benz motors, notably the Mercedes-Benz W123 240D model, and has been described as "the iconic symbol of travel". Morocco's import of the W123 model vehicles was a lucrative business during the 1990s, as well-used cars would sell for a premium in the Moroccan used car market, including inflated prices for spare parts. As of 2014, there were around 55,000 W123 model taxis in operation in Morocco and are popular with drivers given their generous internal space and reliability. The Moroccan government started a scheme in 2014 to offer 50,000 dirhams cash (around $6,100) to drivers who traded in their old Mercedes taxis, citing environmental and safety concerns and added a premium tax on any vehicles imported over 5 years in a bid to slow down the import of older vehicles.

Given the high cost, taxis were known to be stolen and exported to African countries. In 1979, Israeli police discovered five vehicles buried in the Sinai desert, believing that the thieves intended upon recovering them once the territory was returned to Egypt following the Egypt–Israel peace treaty in 1982. Police believed over 80 other cars could have been buried in the desert and owners in America began "chaining their cars to utility poles at night" in an effort to prevent theft.

In the United States, the first major fleet of Mercedes taxis was operated by a firm opened by William Rogers in 1987. Rogers noted that the taxis would be imported used from Europe due to lower costs and equipped with telephones for worldwide calling. The company, named Transit Systems Inc, hit financial difficulties shortly afterwards and ceased business in February 1988.

In Singapore, taxi operators were among the first buyers of Mercedes-Benz in the early 1950s, when Cycle & Carriage secured the franchise. The endorsement by taxi companies of the Mercedes brand increased their popularity among consumers. In 2007, there were an estimated 1,000 E-Class Mercedes taxi vehicles on Singapore's roads, although they only constituted less than 5 percent of the overall taxi fleet in the country.

== Records ==
In 2004, a taxi driver from the city of Thessaloniki in Greece presented to the Mercedes-Benz Museum in Germany his 1976 240D taxi, which had covered approximately 4,600,000 kilometres (2,900,000 mi), including hundreds of journeys to Belgrade to transport supplies during war in the Balkans. At the time, DaimlerChrysler suggested it was the highest mileage vehicle they were aware of at the time. The driver purchased the vehicle in 1981 and changed the engine three times during his ownership. In 2017, it was reported a white Mercedes taxi from Porto, Portugal had also found its way to the Mercedes museum in Stuttgart, having covered around 1,900,000 kilometres (1,200,000 mi). The car had spent around 10 years in use as a taxi, placing it 6th highest in the worldwide highest mileage vehicles.
