= Mercedes-Benz W11 =

Mercedes-Benz Typ 10/50 PS / Typ Stuttgart 200 (W11)
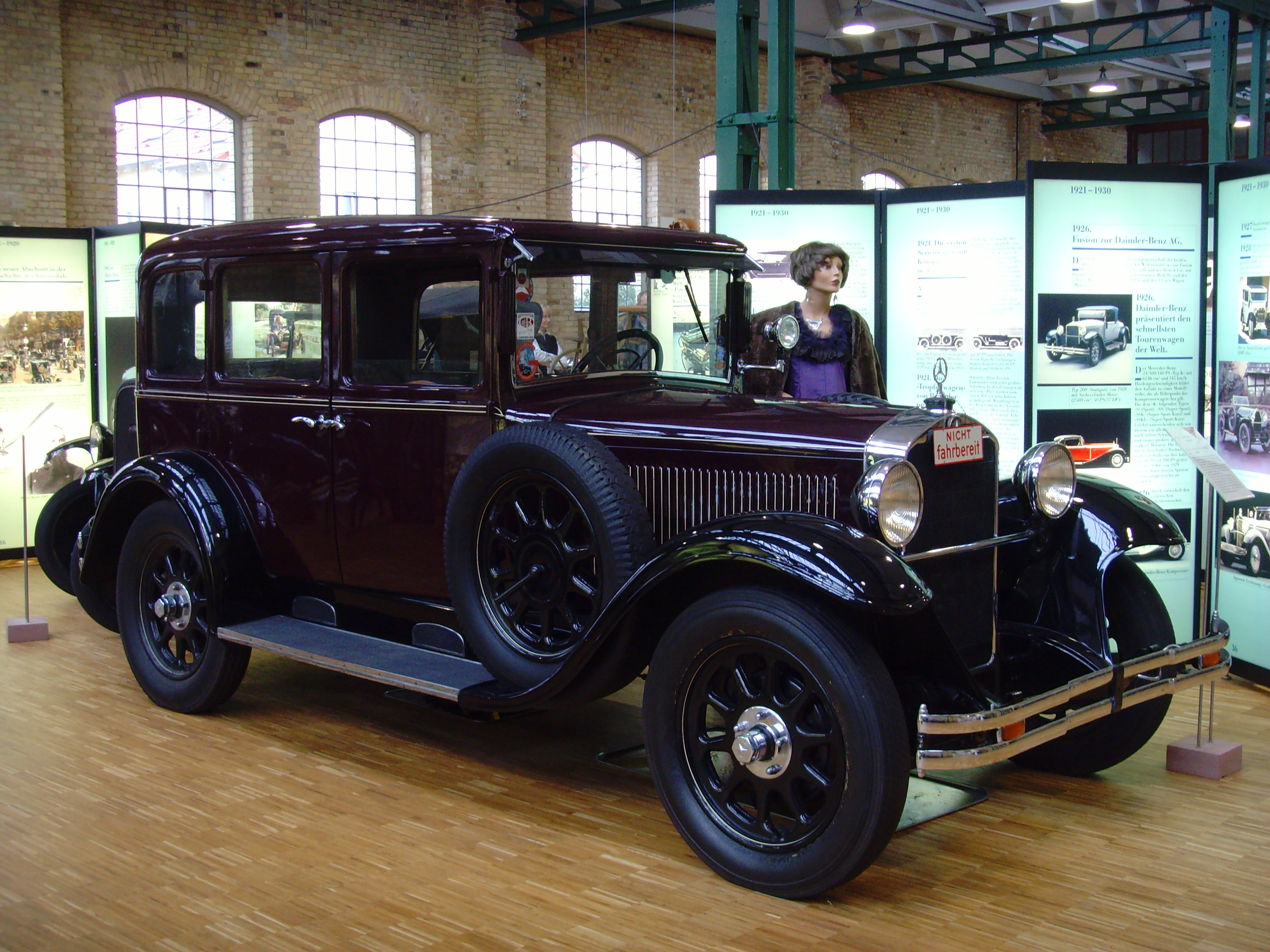

Overview
- Manufacturer: Daimler-Benz AG
- Also called: Mercedes-Benz 10/50 PS; Mercedes-Benz Typ Stuttgart 260; Mercedes-Benz W11
- Production: 1929–1934; 6,757 standard wheelbase 50 long-wheelbase cars 2,376 vans 1,507 military "Kübelwagen"
- Assembly: Stuttgart, Germany

Body and chassis
- Body style: Roadster; Torpedo-bodied "Tourenwagen"; 4-door "Limousine" (sedan/saloon); Cabriolets
- Layout: FR layout

Powertrain
- Engine: 2,581 cc M11 I6

Dimensions
- Wheelbase: 2,810 mm (111 in) or 3,080 mm (121 in)
- Length: 4,230 mm (167 in) or 4,650 mm (183 in)
- Width: 1,710 mm (67 in)
- Height: 1,800 mm (71 in)

The Mercedes-Benz W11 was a midsize six-cylinder automobile introduced by Daimler-Benz it 1929. It was developed from the Mercedes-Benz W02 first seen in 1926, and the W11 shared its chassis and bodywork with the W02, but the W11 came with a larger more powerful engine, a new name and a wider list of “standard bodies” from which customers could choose.

The new car was also sold as the Mercedes-Benz 10/50 PS and as the Mercedes-Benz Typ Stuttgart 260. It continue in production till early 1934, although by then its replacements, the slightly smaller Mercedes-Benz W21 and the slightly larger Mercedes-Benz W18 had both already been in full-scale production for nearly a year.

A light van based on the Mercedes-Benz W11 was also offered, and carried its own works number, being identified as the Mercedes-Benz W37.

== Naming conventions ==
The manufacturer applied the widely followed German naming conventions of the time. On the Mercedes-Benz 10/50 PS the “10” defined the car’s tax horsepower, used by the authorities to determine the level of annual car tax to be imposed on car owners. The “38” defined the manufacturer’s claims regarding car’s actual power output as defined in metric horsepower. In Germany tax horsepower, which had been defined by statute since 1906, was based on the dimensions of the cylinders in the engine.

Unlike the systems used elsewhere in Europe, the German tax horsepower calculation took account both of the cylinder bore and of the cylinder stroke, and there was therefore a direct linear relationship between engine size and tax horsepower. Reflecting the manufacturer’s new naming strategy, the car was also sold as the Mercedes-Benz Typ Stuttgart, the Mercedes-Benz Typ 260 and as the Mercedes-Benz Typ Stuttgart 260.

In retrospect sources tend to use the internal works number whereby the car was identified as the Mercedes-Benz W11. This reduces the risk of confusion with other cars from the same manufacturer incorporating the name "Stuttgart" and / or the number "260" in their names.

== 10/50 PS Typ Stuttgart 260 (W 11) ==
The car was offered in bare chassis form for customers wishing to purchase a car body from an independent coach builder. Standard bodies from the manufacturer started with a Torpedo-bodied “Tourenwagen” and included 2 or 4-door ”Limousine” (sedan/saloon) bodies. There was also a choice from (initially) three different Mercedes-Benz cabriolet bodies, carrying according to the number of seats and of side windows, and listed respectively as the “Cabriolet A,” the “Cabriolet C” and the “Cabriolet D."

In 1933 the manufacturer also produced a Mercedes-Benz W11L with its wheelbase lengthened by 270 mm (11 in) to 3,080 mm (121 in). Intended to accommodate longer six-seater Pullman-bodied cars. There is no record of Mercedes-Benz having offered from their own Sindelfingen coachworks a Pullman body for this vehicle, so customers would have needed to follow the old tradition of arranging bodywork separately with an independent coachbuilder. Only 50 of the long-wheelbase cars were produced but the development provided a useful precedent for the long-wheelbase version of the newer Mercedes-Benz W21 which proved a winner with taxi operators and of which more than 6,000 examples would be produced between 1934 and 1936.

The side-valve six-cylinder 2,581 cc engine delivered a maximum output of 50 PS (37 kW; 49 hp) at 3,400 rpm which translated into a top speed of 90 km/h (56 mph). Power was transmitted to the rear wheels via a four-speed manual transmission, the fourth speed being effectively an overdrive ratio of 1 : 0.76 while the more conventional “top” 1 : 1 ratio was achieved by selecting third gear. The wheels were fixed to a rigid axle suspended from semi-elliptic leaf springs. The braking applied to all four wheels, mechanically controlled using rod linkages.

== L 1000 Express (W 37) ==
Mercedes-Benz L 1000 Express (W37)
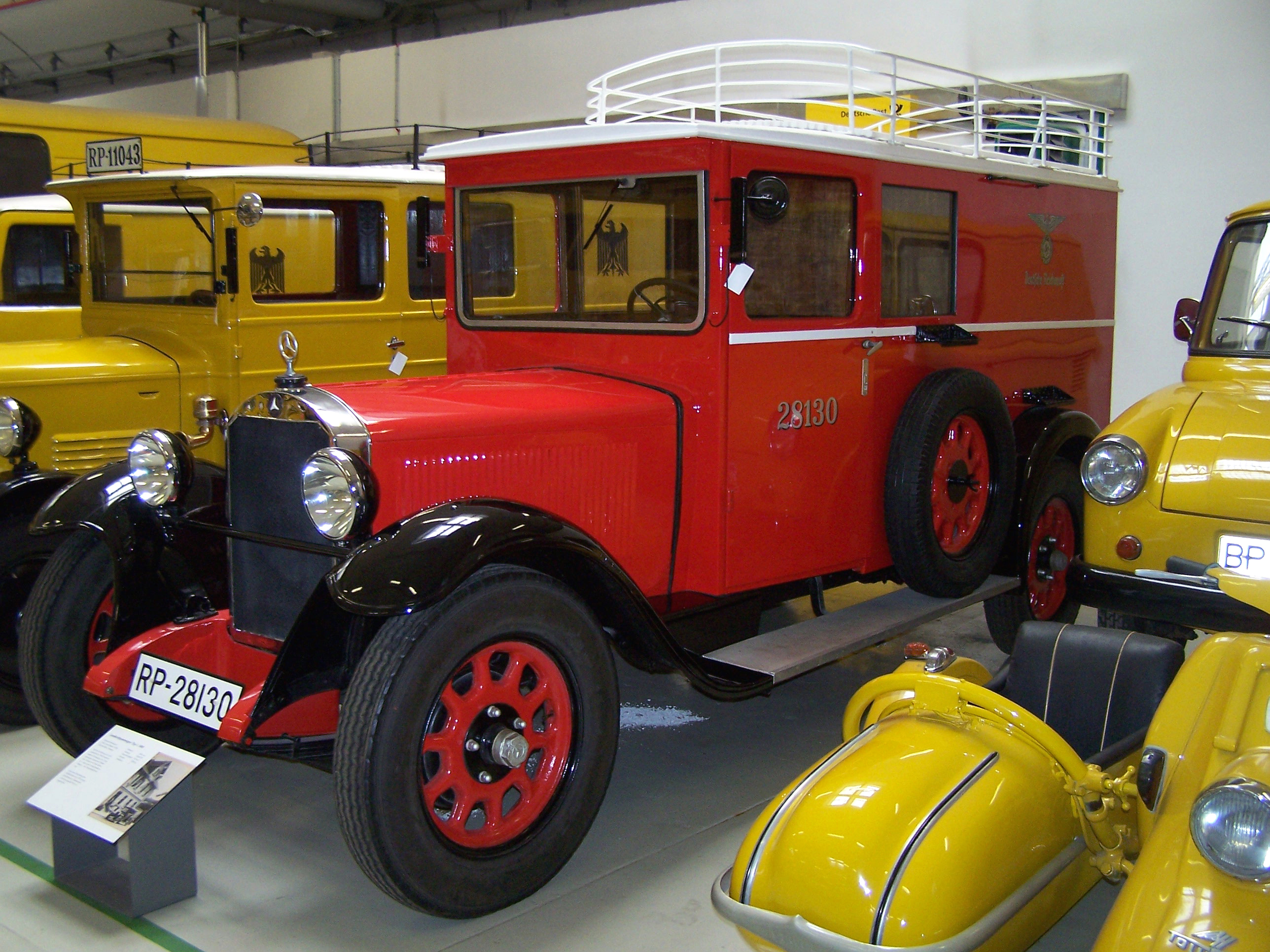
- The W 11 also provided the basis for the L 1,000 Express (Mercedes-Benz W37) which was intended for commercial operators, and most commonly sold as a light van or as a ten seater mini-bus. This one is painted as a postvan.

From 1929 the manufacturer also offered the commercially targeted Mercedes-Benz L 1000 Express which shared the technical elements of the Mercedes-Benz W11 and was known by its internal works number as the W37. Known versions include a flatbed truck, a box van (illustrated), an ambulance and a small ten seater bus.

Between 1929 and 1932 the "10/50 PS / Typ Stuttgart 260" and the less powerful but broadly similar “Typ Stuttgart 200” were the mainstays of the Mercedes-Benz range. The period was a particularly difficult one for the German auto-industry with passenger car sales badly depressed. The 5,640 cars produced in 1929 represented 66% of the manufacturer's output. Corresponding figures (excluding van and military versions ) for the next three years are:

1930: 4,453 cars / 69%,
1931: 2,320 cars / 70%,
1932: 885 cars / 15%

(1932 saw the launch of the all-new and smaller W15 model. )

Production of the 2,581 cc Mercedes Benz Typ 260 / W11 ended with a trickle in 1934, by which time 6,807 had been produced. (If the volumes are combined with those for the less powerful W02 the total comfortably exceeds 20,000.) The replacement W21 model was introduced in 1933, by which year the auto-industry faced a much less bleak immediate-term outlook.

Not included with these passenger car statistics are 1,507 "Kübelwagen" (military quasi-Jeep) versions of the model which continued to be produced until 1935 or 1936.

== Sources and further reading ==
- Werner Oswald: Mercedes-Benz Personenwagen 1886–1986. 4. Auflage. Motorbuch Verlag Stuttgart (1987). ISBN 3-613-01133-6, S. 46–47
- Halwart Schrader: Deutsche Autos 1885–1920. Motorbuch Verlag Stuttgart (2002). ISBN 3-613-02211-7, S. 67
- Oswald, Werner (2001). Deutsche Autos 1920-1945, Band (vol) 2 (in German). Motorbuch Verlag. ISBN 3-613-02170-6.

This entry incorporates information from the equivalent German Wikipedia entry.
