= Mercedes-Benz W21 =

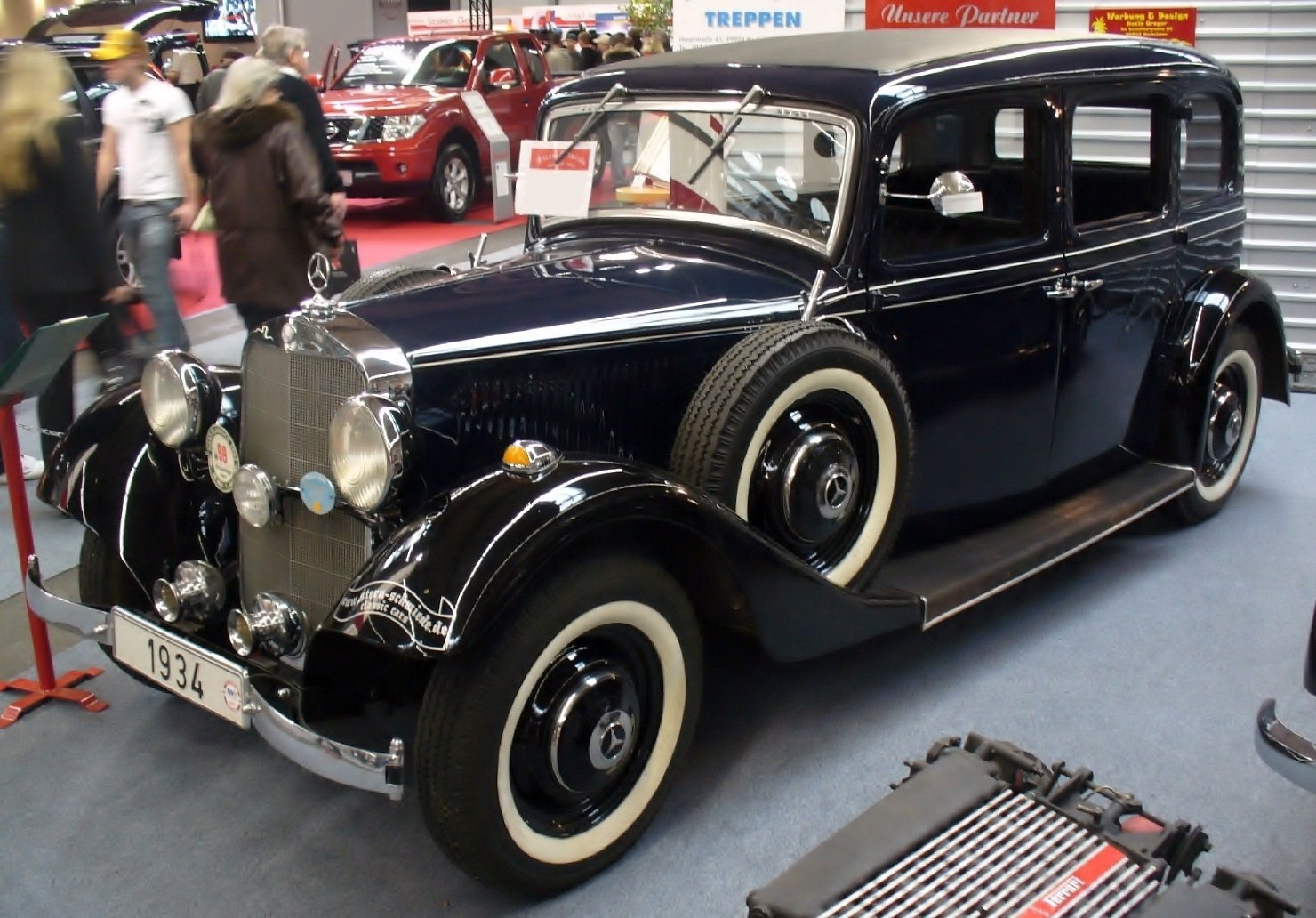
- Mercedes-Benz 200 W21 "Pullman-Limousine" (1935)

Overview
- Manufacturer: Mercedes-Benz
- Also called: Mercedes-Benz Typ(e) 200
- Production: 1933–1936; 15,622 units
- Assembly: Germany: Stuttgart

Body and chassis
- Class: Mid-size luxury car
- Body style: Standard length: 4-door ”Limousine” (sedan); 4-door ”Limousine” (sedan) (from 1935); Torpedo bodied 2-door “Tourenwagen” Cabriolet; Sport-Roadster Long wheelbase (from 1934: 4-door ”Pullman-Limousine” 6-seat “Landaulet” (cabriolet-style folding roof for third row passengers only); Torpedo bodied 6-seat “Tourenwagen” 4-door long ”Limousine” (sedan); Cabriolets (long bodied - a choice of several types)
- Layout: FR layout

Powertrain
- Engine: 1,961 cc I6

Dimensions
- Wheelbase: 2,700 mm (110 in) or 3,050 mm (120 in)
- Length: 4,060 mm (160 in) - 4,550 mm (179 in)
- Width: 1,630 mm (64 in)
- Height: 1,580 mm (62 in)

Chronology
- Predecessor: Mercedes-Benz W02
- Successor: Mercedes-Benz W143

The Mercedes-Benz W 21 was a six-cylinder passenger car launched in 1933 using the name Mercedes-Benz Typ 200. It was one of several Mercedes-Benz models known, in its own time, as the Mercedes-Benz 200 (or sometimes, in this case, as the Mercedes-Benz Typ(e) 200) and is therefore in retrospect more commonly referred to using its Mercedes-Benz works number, “W21”.

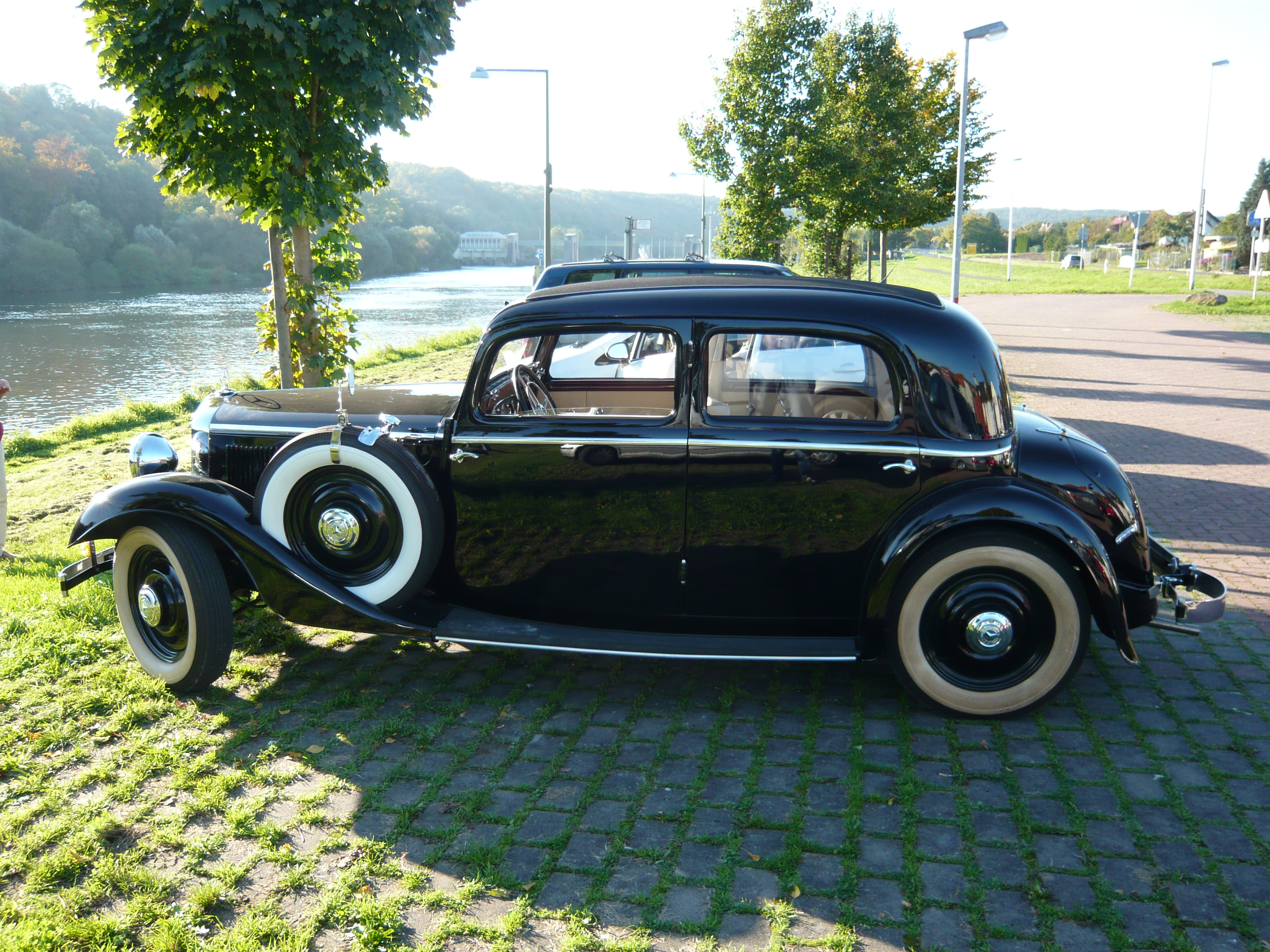
Mercedes-Benz 200 W21 4-door "Limousine" (1935)

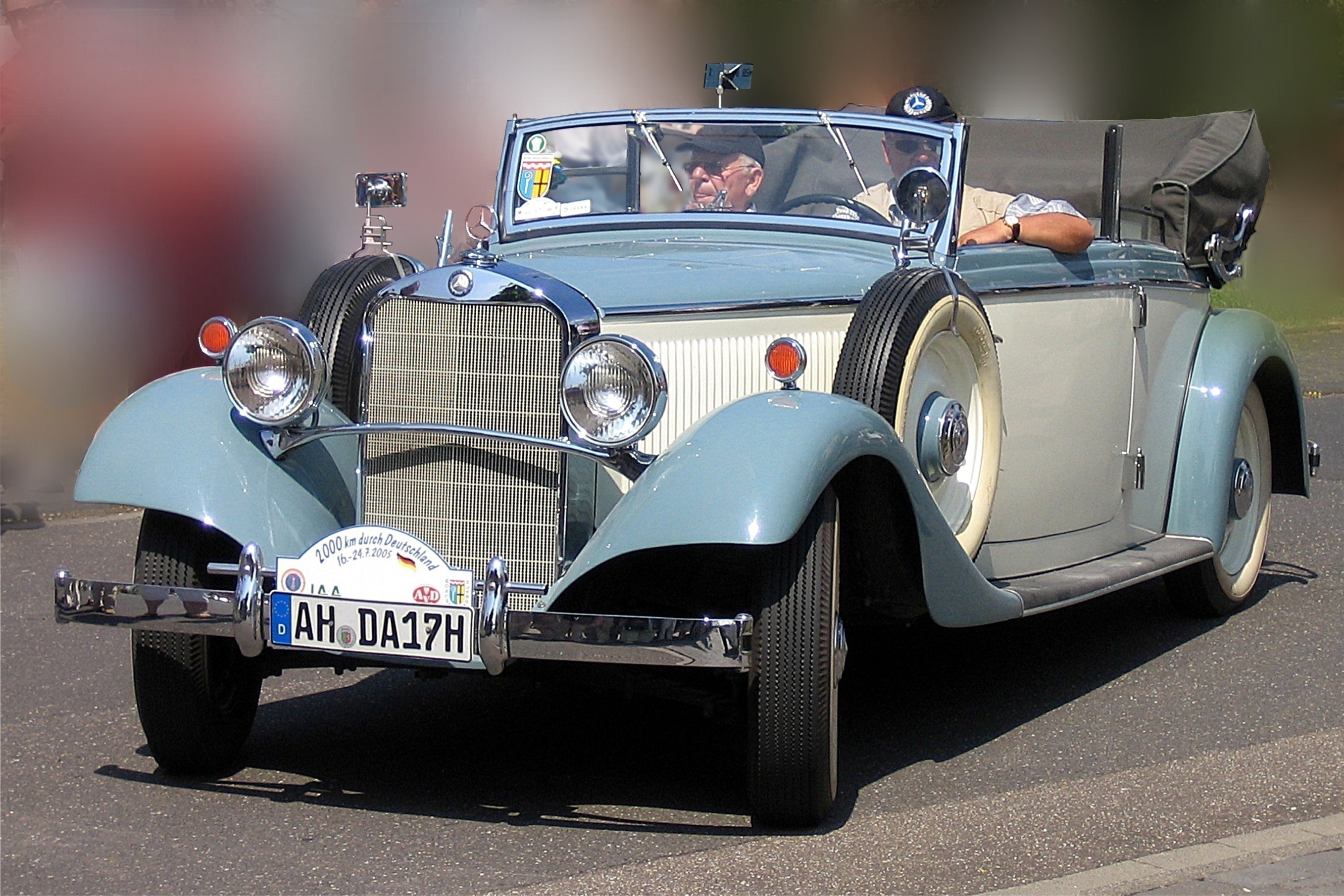
Mercedes-Benz 200 W21 cabriolet (1935)

The car was a development upmarket from the manufacturer's W15, itself introduced two years earlier. The W21 replaced the Mercedes-Benz W02 (in its own day known as the Mercedes-Benz Typ(e) 200 “Stuttgart”) which the company had been manufacturing since 1928.

== Bodies ==
The car was available as a two- or four-door Torpedo bodied “Tourenwagen”, a four- and (from 1935) two-door “Limousine” (sedan/saloon), a three- or four-seater Cabriolets or as a sporting two-seater.

In 1934 a lengthened version of the car was introduced, its wheel base increased by 350 mm (14 in) to 3,050 mm (120 in). Models offered on the longer wheelbase included a six-seater “Pullman-Limousine”, a “Pullman-Laundaulet”, a longer Torpedo bodied “Tourenwagen”, a more streamlined 4-door “Limousine” (sedan/saloon) and three different longer wheel base Cabriolets listed respectively as the “Cabriolet A”, the “Cabriolet B” and the “Cabriolet D”.

== Engine and running gear ==
The side-valve six-cylinder engine had a capacity of 1,961 cc which produced a claimed maximum output of 40 PS (29 kW; 39 hp) at 3,200 rpm. The engine shared its 85 mm (3.3 in) piston stroke length with the smaller 6-cylinder unit fitted in the manufacturer's W15 model, but for the W21 the bore was increased by 5 mm (0.20 in) to 70 mm (2.8 in). The stated top speed was 98 km/h (61 mph) for the standard length and 95 km/h (59 mph) for the long bodied cars. Power passed to the rear wheels through a four-speed manual transmission in which the top gear was effectively an overdrive ratio. The top two ratios featured synchromesh. The brakes operated on all four wheels via a hydraulic linkage.

During the model's final year, Mercedes-Benz announced, in June 1936, the option of a more powerful 2,229 cc 55 PS (40 kW; 54 hp) engine, which was seen as a necessary response to criticism of the car's leisurely performance in long bodied form.

== Commercial ==
In terms of features and performance the W21 represented considerable progress when compared to its predecessor, and was priced at the same level although it was equipped a little more simply and in standard-wheelbase form was a little smaller. The appearance of a long-wheelbase version a year after the introduction of the standard bodied car was in part intended to address comments that the W21 as originally launched was a little small to be considered a full-size taxi. Nevertheless, the standard-wheelbase model achieved output of 9,281 cars during a production run of slightly more than three years, while the long-wheelbase model achieved 6,341 cars during a shorter production run of slightly above two years.

A notable success was the popularity of the longer-bodied six-seater "Pullman-Limousine"–bodied version for use as a "Kraftdroschke" (Taxi). It was presumably simple flattery when, in August 1934, Opel announced a long-wheelbase-Pullman-bodied version of their Opel 6. The cars were conceptually similar and even shared an identical 3,050 mm (120 in) wheelbase, although the Opel was lighter, a little less powerful and in terms of performance claims slightly faster. The biggest difference for the buyer was probably the one that surfaced when paying for the car. Even the least expensive of the longer-wheelbase Mercedes-Benz 200s, the non-Pullman–bodied four-door Limousine was listed in 1934 at 5,700 Marks while the "Pullman-Limousine"–bodied version started at 6,550 Reichsmark. The "Pullman-Landaulet"(with a cabriolet-style folding hood over just the rear row of seats) or a “Cabrio-Limousine” (Opel) or “Tourenwagen” (Mercedes-Benz) but at every level the prices quoted indicate that Mercedes-Benz were commanding a large price premium with the taxi operators.

== Sources and further reading ==
- Werner Oswald: Mercedes-Benz Personenwagen 1886–1986. Motorbuch-Verlag. Stuttgart 1987, ISBN 3-613-01133-6.
- Oswald, Werner (2001). Deutsche Autos 1920-1945, Band (vol) 2 (in German). Motorbuch Verlag. ISBN 3-613-02170-6.

This entry incorporates information from the German Wikipedia equivalent article.
