= Hagerty (disambiguation) =

Hagerty is a surname.

Hagerty may also refer to:

== Places ==
- Hagerty House, Marshall, Texas, US; an NRHP-listed building
- Josephine M. Hagerty House (Hagerty House), Cohasset, Massachusetts, US; an NRHP-listed building
- Paul J. Hagerty High School, Oviedo, Florida, US

== Other uses ==
- Hagerty (Insurance), a U.S. automotive insurance company
- Hagerty Incident (1960 June 10; Japanese: ハガチー事件, romanized: Hagachii jiken), part of the Anpo Protests

== See also ==
- Haggarty (surname)
- Haggerty (surname)
- Heggarty (surname)
- Hagarty (surname)
- Hegarty (surname)
- Hegerty (surname)
