= Hagerty =

Hagerty is a surname. Notable people with this surname include:

- Barbara Bradley Hagerty, American author and journalist
- James Hagerty (1909–1981), American White House press secretary
- John K. Hagerty (1867–1945), American politician
- Joseph Hagerty (born 1982), American artistic gymnast
- Julie Hagerty (born 1955), American actress and model
- Marie Hagerty (born 1964), Australian artist, painter and teacher
- Marilyn Hagerty (1926–2025), American newspaper columnist
- Michael G. Hagerty (1954–2022), American actor
- Neil Hagerty (born 1965), American guitarist and songwriter and author
- Thomas J. Hagerty (fl. early 20th century), American Catholic priest from New Mexico and labor activist
- William Hagerty (disambiguation)
  - William F. Hagerty (born 1959), American politician from Tennessee

== See also ==
- Haggarty (surname)
- Haggerty (surname)
- Heggarty (surname)
- Hagarty (surname)
- Hegarty (surname)
- Hegerty (surname)
