= Ted Reeve =

Multi-sport athlete and sports journalist

Profile
- Position: Running back

Personal information
- Born: January 6, 1902; Toronto, Ontario, Canada
- Died: August 27, 1983 (aged 81); Toronto, Ontario, Canada

Career history
- 1923: Toronto Argonauts
- 1924–1930: Toronto Balmy Beach Beachers

Awards and highlights
- 2× Grey Cup champion (1927, 1930)
- Canadian Football Hall of Fame (Class of 1963)

Edward Henry Reeve (January 6, 1902 – August 27, 1983) was a multi-sport Canadian athlete and sports journalist. He was on two Grey Cup winning teams as a football player, a Mann Cup championship as a lacrosse player and three Yates Cup championships as a coach for Queen's University. He is a member of Canada's Sports Hall of Fame. As an athlete Reeve was noted for determination and inspiring team-mates. He acquired the nickname "the Moaner" in later years after one of the characters in his newspaper columns, Moaner McGruffery.

== Athletic career ==
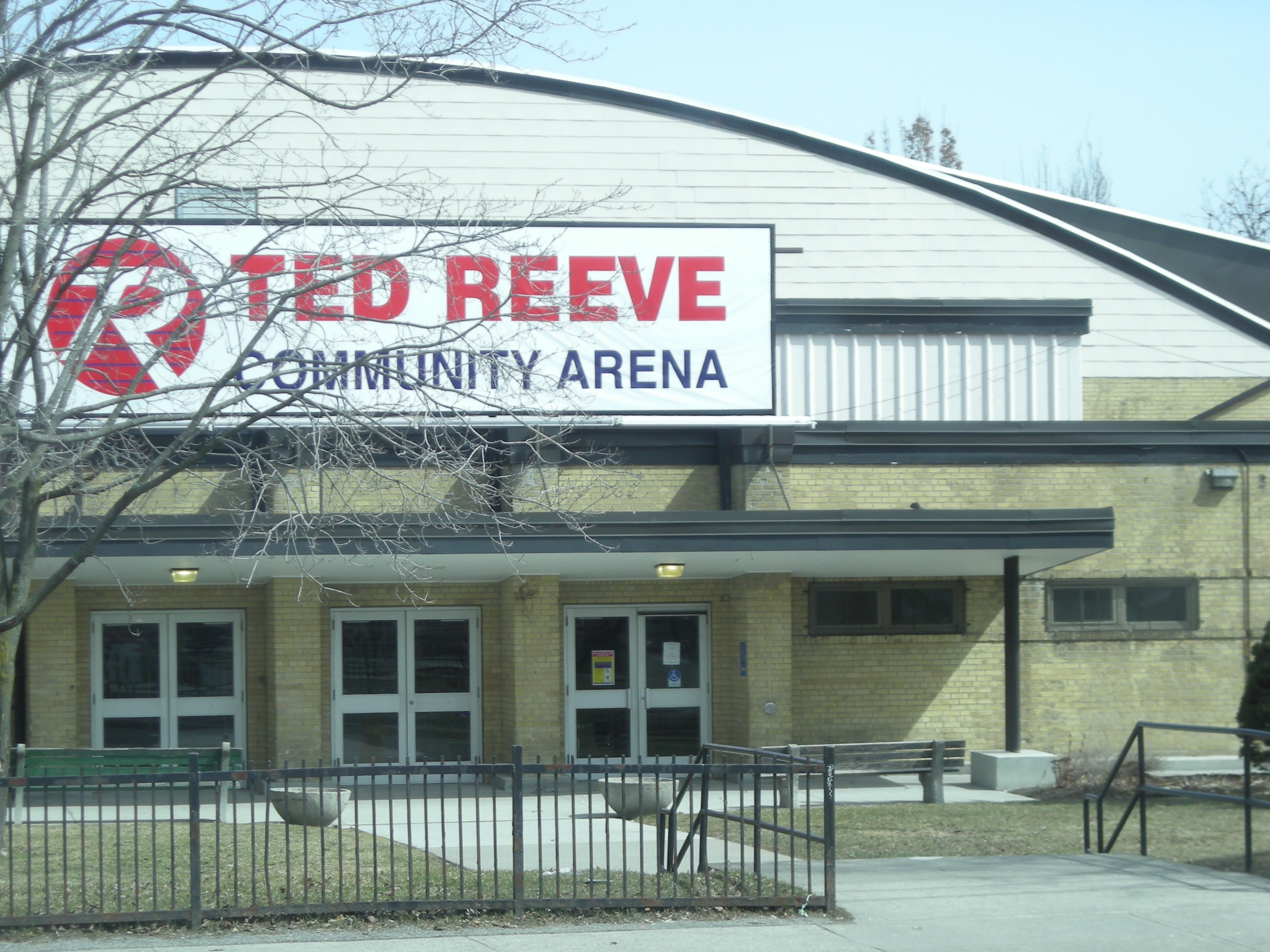
Arena in Toronto's east end, named in Ted Reeve's honour

Ted Reeve was one of Canada's best lacrosse players. He won the Mann Cup with the Oshawa Generals in 1929 and the Brampton Excelsiors in 1930. He turned pro with Montreal in 1931 in what was a new lacrosse league, but the league folded after one season. After serving in World War I, he attempted to break into professional football with the Canadian Rugby Union, precursor of the Canadian Football League. He first played for the Toronto Argonauts before winning the Ontario Rugby Football Union championship five times and then the Grey Cup twice in 1927 and 1930, all with the Balmy Beach club in Toronto. Reeve played middle wing position with the Toronto Balmy Beach rugby team who were at the time one of the most powerful teams in Canada. The often injured Reeve was admired for his toughness. During the Grey Cup final in the 1920s his Balmy Beach team was leading by a narrow margin late in the game when the opposition was preparing to kick the winning field goal. He had been forced to sit out most of the game due to a serious injury. Despite being injured he went on the field and blocked the kick. In his Toronto Telegram newspaper column the next day he wrote:

When I was young and in my prime
I used to block kicks all the time.
But now that I am old and grey

I only block them once a day.

== Sports writing and coaching ==
After retiring as an athlete he both wrote a newspaper sports column and coached football.

He was coach of the Queen's University football team from 1933 to 1938 where they won three Yates Cup championships the most famous of which was the 1934 victory by the 'Fearless Fourteen', a squad that dressed only 14 players all year owing to academic suspensions which Reeve refused to substitute for. He then coached the Montreal Royals in 1939, the Toronto Balmy Beach in 1945 and 1946 and then the Toronto Beaches-Indians in 1948.

He had been writing a weekly lacrosse column as early as 1921 when he was with the St. Aidan's junior rugby team in the Toronto Beaches. He wrote for the Toronto Telegram from 1923 to 1971. In 1927 the Telegram decided to discontinue his lacrosse columns. While he was recovering from a broken leg, Reeve began to freelance his stories and sold a couple to a US publication. He received an offer to join the Telegram full-time because editor C.O. Knowles liked his style. He was told, "have a crack at it. If you can't do it we'll let you out." His column Sporting Extras became known for its humour and was considered one of the finest sports features in Canada. He received a National Newspaper Award for excellence in 1961.

Reeve had the reputation for living life to the full and his friends each had their own favourite "Ted Reeve" story they would tell. One such story is from the time he was covering the Stanley Cup playoffs involving the New York Rangers. The Toronto Telegram editors were finding that as the hockey series continued, the columns he was submitting from New York were becoming progressively shorter and shorter. They only later discovered that after each game he and the coach of the Rangers, Frank Boucher, would meet at Hogan's Irish House, a drinking establishment that apparently never closed. Eventually the paper's editors received his shortest column of all, consisting of just seven words: "They got me, boys, they got me."

On another occasion, Reeve overheard the Telegram's sports editor complaining "that fellow Bassett", whom Reeve had never heard of before at the paper, was always asking them to get tickets for hockey games. That night in the VIP box at Maple Leaf Gardens, Reeve was introduced to Bassett and used the opportunity to deliver the reprimand, "You're the guy downstairs who's always bellyaching for tickets. Every time you get a couple from us, you're cheating some office boy out of them." The next day, Reeve discovered that John W. H. Bassett was about to be the new owner of The Telegram.

When the Telegram went out of business in 1971, after writing for the paper for 50 years, he said "When I joined the paper they said it would be a full-time job." He then wrote for the Toronto Sun which was launched only two days after the closure of the Telegram. When staff at the Sun saw him arrive they stood on their feet and applauded, as his presence gave the fledgling paper legitimacy.

Reeve once lamented the trend of sports writers creating articles which simply consisted of nothing more than the coach's opinions on the game. "Many of the writers are little more than stenographers," he said.

== War record ==
Ted Reeve was a strong supporter of the Canadian effort in both world wars. Although he was well past military age during World War II, he attempted to enlist, but he was rejected by the medical officers because he was suffering from arthritis and varicose veins . He joined the Toronto Scottish reserve and then underwent surgery for the varicose veins which allowed him to pass his medical. He joined Conn Smythe's 30th Battery, Royal Canadian Artillery as a gunner and went to France shortly after D-Day. Reeve sporadically continued his columns for the Telegram, but they concentrated on the war instead of sport. These columns, of the experiences of the Canadian soldier in Europe, were very popular with Canadians at home. While Reeve was a regular enlisted soldier and much older than many of the younger majors, captains and officers, they looked up to Reeve as a leader. He was discharged from the army when his elbow was smashed by a flying rock. In November 1944, the Canadian Press story from the military hospital in Southern England where he was recovering reported that Reeve's greatest concern "is to get his haircut, because he wants to look his best when he meets his wife and the gang around Toronto's Balmy Beach."

== Personal life and death ==
Reeve was a lifelong Toronto Beaches resident. A rink in east Toronto is named in his honour. From 1929 to 1932 Reeve coached football at Malvern Collegiate, a local area high school. They won so many championships under his guidance that the school board passed a ruling requiring that only teachers could coach.

Later in life, he was troubled with arthritis from his numerous sporting injuries. It was said he had broken 47 bones over the course of his playing career.

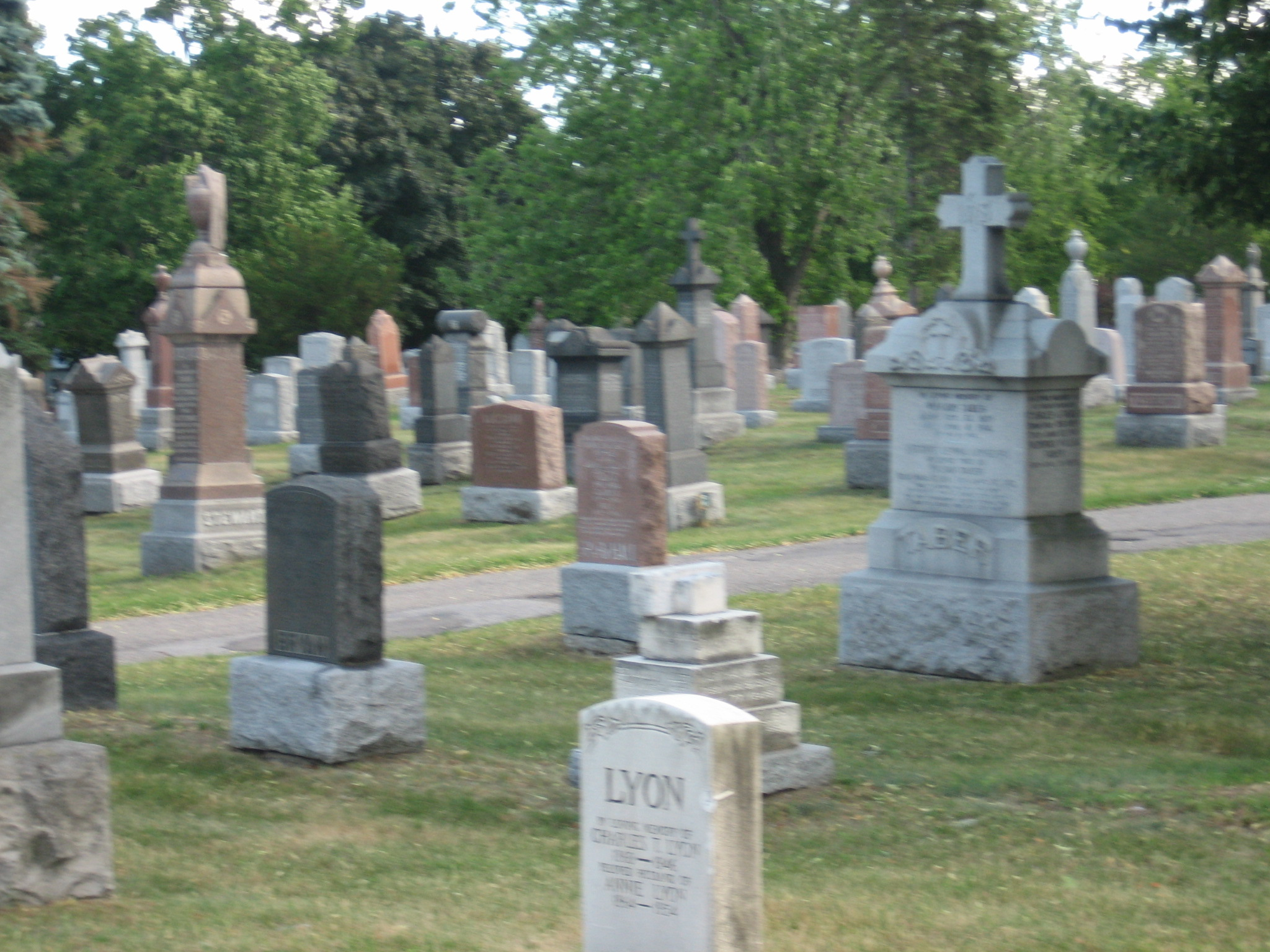
St. John's Norway cemetery in his beloved Beaches, where Reeve is interred along with his parents and wife.

On Saturday, August 27, 1983, Ted Reeve died after a short stay in the hospital. Reeve was buried on a warm, rainy morning August 30 at St. John's Norway Anglican Church in his beloved Beaches area of east-end Toronto. Attending his funeral were Lt. Gov. John Black Aird, Premier of Ontario William Davis, Mayor of Toronto Art Eggleton, Attorney General of Ontario Roy McMurtry, former NHL stars Ace Bailey and King Clancy, Commissioner of the Canadian Football League Jake Gaudaur, Harold Ballard owner of the Toronto Maple Leafs and many other sports figures. Rev. Bob Rumball of the Evangelical Church of the Deaf delivered the eulogy. He was survived by his wife Alvern, a son and a daughter.

== Honours and awards ==
- Canada Sports Hall of Fame
- Canadian Football Hall of Fame - Charter member
- Canadian Lacrosse Hall of Fame inducted 1966 as Charter member
- Football Reporters of Canada Hall of Fame
- 1961 National Newspaper Award - Sports Writing

== Sporting achievements ==
- Mann Cup 1929, 1930 (player)
- Ontario Rugby Football Union championship 1924, 1925, 1926, 1927, and 1930 (player)
- Grey Cup 1927, 1930 (player)
- Yates Cup 1934, 1935, and 1937 (Coach of Queen's University)
