= Haggerty =

Haggerty is a surname. Notable people with the surname include:

- Ancer L. Haggerty (born 1944), American jurist on the U.S. District Court
- Ben Haggerty or Macklemore (born 1983), American rapper and musician
- Dan Haggerty (1941–2016), American bodybuilder, animal trainer, and actor
- Don Haggerty (1914–1988), American film actor
- Frank Haggerty (1876–1962), American college sports coach
- Gareth Haggerty (born 1981), British rugby league player
- James, Jim, or Jimmy Haggerty, multiple people
- Joan Haggerty (born 1940), Canadian novelist
- Jonathan Haggerty (born 1997), British Muay Thai kickboxer
- John Haggerty (disambiguation), multiple people
- Mike Haggerty (born 1945), American football player
- Nelson Haggerty (1973–2021), American basketball coach and player
- Pat Haggerty (died 1994), American football official in the NFL
- Patrick E. Haggerty (1914–1980), Texas Instruments co-founder
- PJ Haggerty (born 2004), American college basketball player
- Ray Haggerty (1923–2011), Canadian politician; served in the Legislative Assembly of Ontario
- Roy Haggerty (born 1966), Canadian-American scientist; professor and administrator at Oregon State University
- Sam Haggerty (born 1994), American baseball player
- Jim and Diane Haggerty, husband and wife in musical duo, The Haggertys

== See also ==
- Haggerty Award, an annual college basketball award
- Hagerty (disambiguation)
