= Hagarty =

Hagarty is an Irish surname. Notable people with the surname include:

- Clara Hagarty (1871–1958), Canadian artist
- John Hawkins Hagarty (1816–1900), Canadian lawyer, teacher and judge
- Lois Sherman Hagarty (born 1948), former Republican member of the Pennsylvania House of Representatives
- Nathan Hagarty, Australian politician
- Paul Leonard Hagarty (1909–1984), American prelate of the Catholic Church
- Wilbert Hagarty (1888–1963), farmer and political figure in Saskatchewan

== See also ==
- Hagerty, surname
- Haggarty, surname
- Hegarty, surname
