= John Hegarty =

John Hegarty may refer to:

- John Hegarty (academic), Provost of Trinity College
- John Hegarty (Gaelic footballer), player for Wexford
- John Hegarty (rugby union) (1925–2016), Scottish rugby union footballer
- John Hegarty (politician) (born 1947), Australian politician
- John Hegarty (advertising executive) (born 1944)
- Jack Hegarty (1888–1974), American football player

== See also ==
- John Hawkins Hagarty (1816–1900), Canadian lawyer, teacher and judge
- John Haggerty (disambiguation)
