= Gull Wing Group International =

Organization of Mercedes-Benz 300 SL enthusiasts

Gull Wing Group International Inc
- Formation: August 1, 1961; 65 years ago
- Type: Nonprofit 501(c)(7)
- Purpose: Social & Recreational Car Club
- Headquarters: Chico, California
- Region served: International
- Members: 600
- Official language: English
- President: David Dukehart
- Website: www.gullwinggroup.org

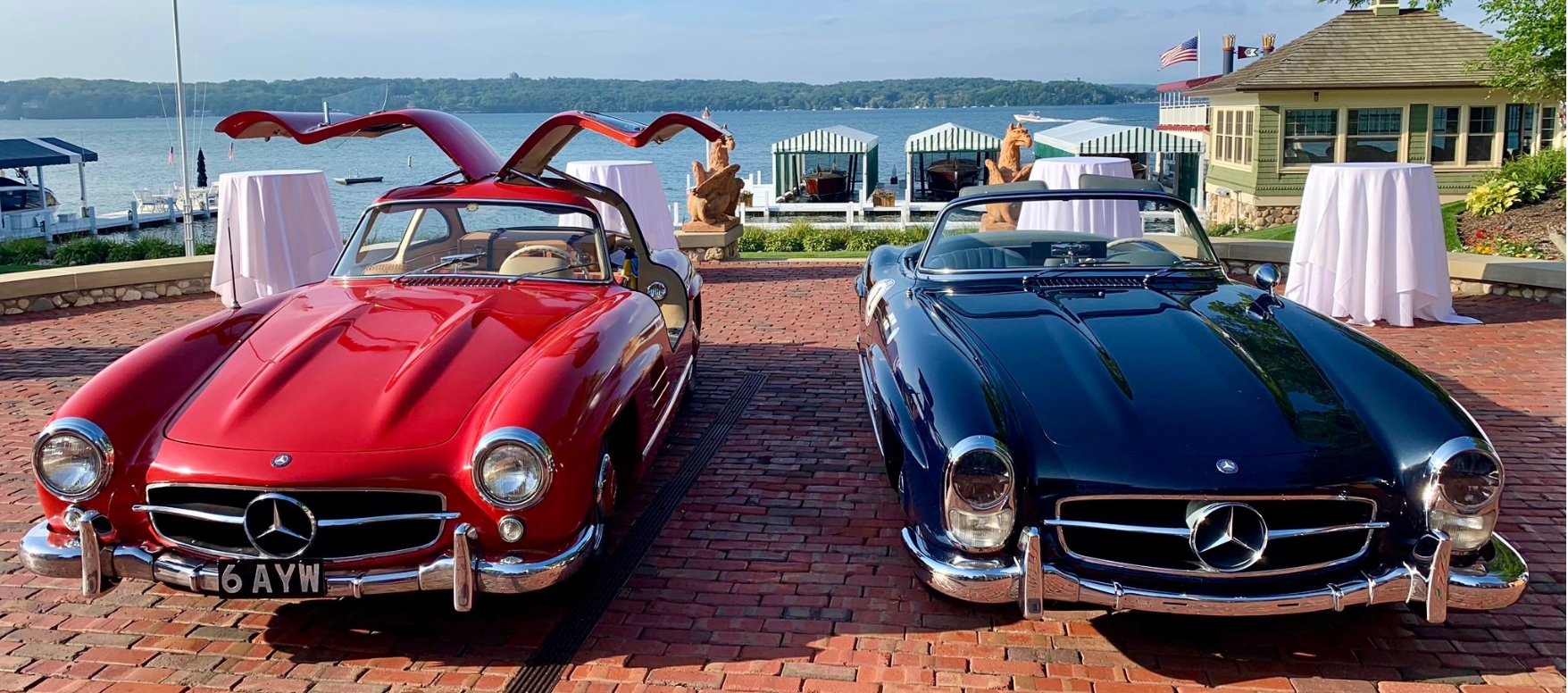
Coupe and Roadster at 2019 GWG Convention

The Gull Wing Group International (GWG) is a 501(c)(7) nonprofit organization founded in 1961 by enthusiasts of the 1954 to 1963 Mercedes-Benz 300 SL. With members worldwide, the organization aims to maintain the 300SL and provide members with the opportunity to become acquainted with the mechanics and handling of the iconic car. In addition to fostering a community of enthusiasts, the GWG organizes car-related events, including driving tours, an annual convention featuring technical sessions and driver's education, and social events. The organization also supports various charities and has an open membership policy, inviting individuals with an interest in the 300SL to join. In 2020, the GWG extended membership to owners of the Mercedes-Benz SLS AMG, a modern revival of the Gull Wing design, further expanding the reach of the organization to younger car enthusiasts.

== History ==
The GWG started with eighteen Mercedes 300SL enthusiasts in August 1961 by Ernie Spitzer, an entrepreneur who owned a commercial printing business. The first meeting was held in Palo Alto, California at Ricky's Studio Inn and Hotel.

By the end of 1961, the club had expanded to 38 dues paying members. A year later, the members and their cars were photographed at the Presidio with the Golden Gate Bridge in the background for Road & Track magazine and the 1963 issue of the Mercedes Benz magazine In Aller Welt and again in 1979. By the end of 1962, the organization had grown to just over 50, with some now coming from the rest of the United States and Canada. Many members were from Southern California and Oregon.

By fall of 1963, there were by-laws, and members paid dues of $10.00. By 1965, the GWG had formed a Southern California Chapter, and the first meeting took place at the home of Stan Kauffman on August 11, 1965. Kauffman was President, James Mangham was VP, and Tom Burniston was Secretary. Nineteen members of the Northern and Southern California Chapters met in Santa Barbara to plan for the first annual get-together, which was held in Reno, Nevada in May 1969. Membership had risen to nearly 200, and almost half attended the event when Chad Hunt became president.

The organization began attracting members from all over the country, and Hunt suggested a formal Business Office be created. In 1971, membership had grown to 387. The GWG accepted roadster owners in 1971 though they could not vote. In 1972 Roadster owners were able to vote.

Since 2006, Gull Wing Group International has presented the Ernie Spitzer Distinguished Service Award, which the club has described as recognizing members for extraordinary contributions and outstanding volunteer service to the club. Documented recipients published in 300 StarLetter include Ernest Spitzer and Col. E.A. (Ozzie) von Orde in 2006, Lynn Yakel and Roberta Nichols Yakel in 2007, Chad Hunt, Barbara Hunt, Bob MacKey, and Jackie MacKey in 2008, Steve Marx, K.B. Pearce, and Ted Stroscher in 2010, Bob Sirna in 2011, and Gary Estep, Dick Fleenor, Tom Bau, and Linda Bau in 2012. Barclay Henderson received the award in 2014. Later published recipients include Robert Slayden in 2019, Laurie Marx, Gary Jarvis, and Brownie and John Willott Sr. in 2021, Tom Burniston in 2024, and Amir Almagor in 2025.

In 2020, the GWG board voted on formally inviting Mercedes-Benz SLS AMG owners to become members. Inviting the SLS owners into the GWG exposes the 300 SL model to younger car enthusiasts. The SLS AMG is the spiritual successor to the 300 SL. The SLS AMG was designed to be a modern Gull Wing revival, and Mercedes produced 11473 cars from 2010 to 2015. Many GWG members who own a 300 SL also own an SLS. SLSs can be shown and judged at conventions.

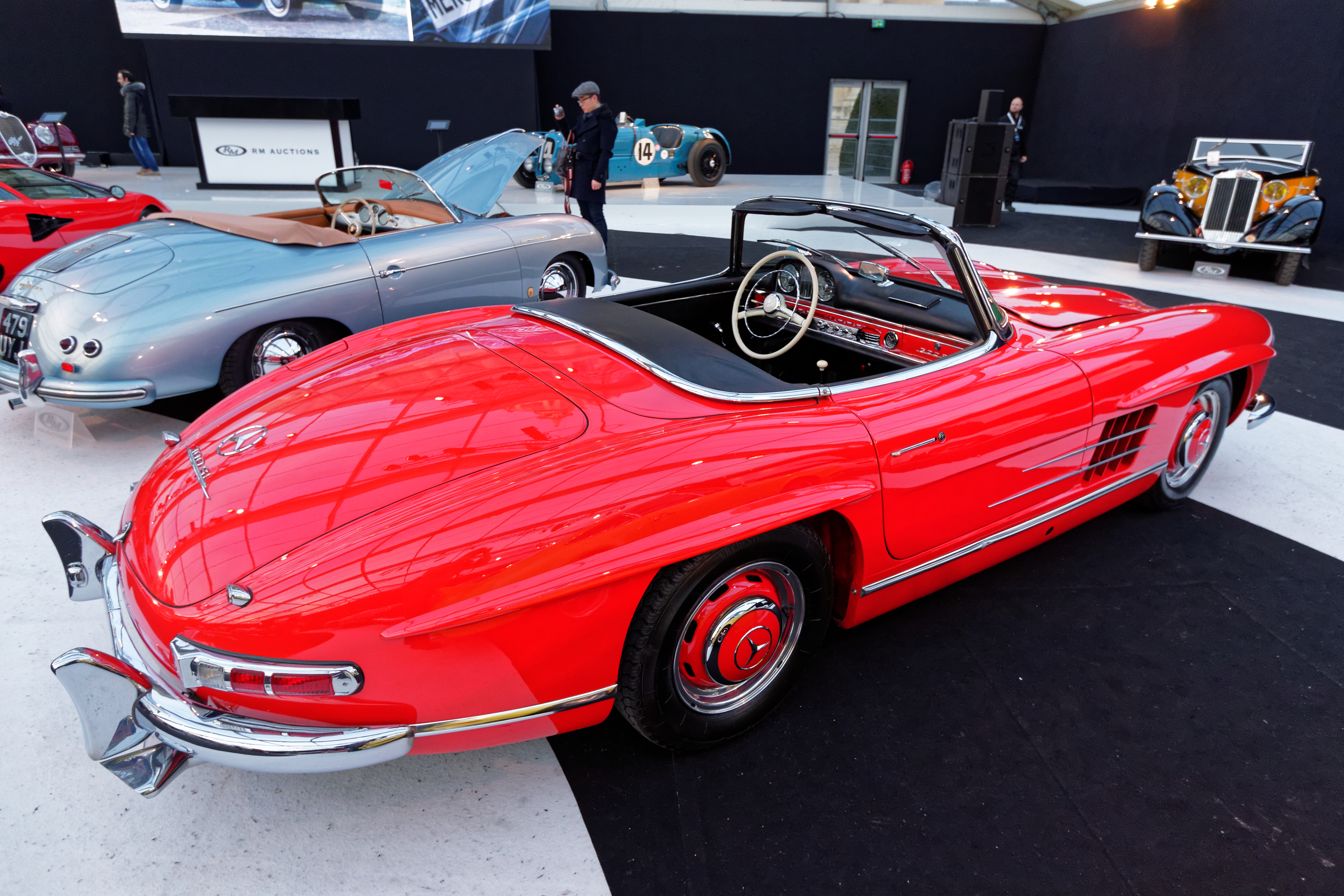
Roadsters and SLSs' are welcomed in the Group

== Events ==
The first official event was a series of three technical sessions by a representative of the Robert Bosch Corporation covering the car's fuel injection system. GWG has held driving events every year other than 2020.

On 11 June 2011, the GWG gathered at Fort Point at the south end of the Golden Gate Bridge to celebrate the 50th anniversary of the club.

President John Willott and fellow members Craig Mcloughlin and Tom Thornhill organized a tour of Arizona driving 1000 miles in 2018. Rykodisc founder, Don Rose participated.

In 2012, member, Garry Boyce, organized an international rally tour in New Zealand.

Bob Sirna, a previous president of the organization, set a new Bonneville Speedway F/GT speed record in 2016 in a 300 SL, establishing a new mark for 3L Sports cars of 190.759 mph. Sirna's project was executed with Dean Johnson's assistance. Dean Johnson is an ex-board member of the GWG and serves on the Tech Committee.

Amir Almagor, a board member of the group, organized the 2015 and 2018 Holyland1000 tours in Israel. Eight Roadsters and two Gullwings participated in March 2018 in a 1000-mile tour of 77 pre-1965 cars around Israel.

The organization has an international membership of approximately 600 members from 25 countries. As of 2019, Southern California is the largest region with 150 active members. Membership is open to anyone. Each fall, an annual convention is held in different locations throughout the United States and Canada. The 2021 annual Convention in The Broadmoor in Colorado Springs, Colorado for five days celebrated the 60th Anniversary of the Gull Wing Group. One hundred and seventeen members came to the Convention, including 15 first-time attendees.

The GWG members attend events around the country every year, including the Copperstate 1000 and the Colorado Grand.

== Publications ==
Spitzer typed up a (nearly) monthly bulletin, the precursor to the Group's 300StarLetter. The first Bulletin was a simple four-page mimeographed edition produced in January 1962. The cover topic for the June 1962 issue was the First Anniversary Dinner, which was coming up later that month at the San Francisco Airport Hilton. The tab of $5.00 per person for the evening included a cocktail hour and dinner. The award-winning 300StarLetter is published ten times a year.

The Group's roster has been a valuable vehicle ownership source and maintains an active directory that shows the provenance of cars sold at auction.

== Benefits ==
In 2025, *The Star*-the Mercedes-Benz Club of America’s magazine-ran a feature on Gull Wing Group International that profiles the club’s membership, events, and technical programming. The article positioned GWG within the broader Mercedes-Benz enthusiast community, documenting its ongoing preservation and education efforts. The feature article documents GWG’s operating model—technical committee support, a member-run parts and provenance network, and hands-on “tech session” programming—as the backbone of its preservation mission for 300 SLs. It describes the annual convention’s format (driver education, road tours, technical workshops, and a judged display) and notes the intentional inclusion of SLS AMG owners to broaden generational engagement. It also highlights GWG’s role as a knowledge hub for authenticity, safety, and maintenance standards across Gullwing and Roadster owners, positioning the club as a bridge between marque heritage and contemporary use.

The GWG has a parts store open to members, technical assistance from its technical committee, an annual convention and rally held in different parts of the USA.

The 300SL Classic was initiated by GWG members Tom Thornhill, John Willott, and Craig McLaughlin and continues to be supported by the GWG.

The 300SL Classic supports charities such as the Make a Wish Foundation and McPherson College.

== Conventions ==
As of 2025, there have been 55 Conventions. Past conventions have been held in Lake Geneva, Wisconsin; Pasadena, California; Santa Fe, New Mexico; Jackson Hole, Wyoming; Saratoga Springs, New York; Dearborn, Michigan; Las Vegas, Nevada; Newport, Rhode Island; Nashville, Tennessee; Victoria, British Columbia; Sun Valley, Idaho; Flagstaff, Arizona; Palm Springs, California; Montvale, New Jersey; New Orleans, Louisiana; Homestead, Virginia; Colorado Springs, Colorado; Greenbrier County, West Virginia and many other locations.

=== 2022 convention ===
One hundred five attendees, along with ten Gullwings and twelve Roadsters participated in Greenbrier, WV. As well as eight SLSs (5 coupes and three roadsters), a 280 SL, a 300D Adenauer, two “Ostermeier” Gullwings, and one hand-built tribute Gullwing. The 2022 convention had enough SLSs at the show to give awards for the first time. Hagerty presented on classic car insurance and others gave a review of SLS cars, options, and current market trends. The Fédération Internationale des Véhicules Anciens (FIVA) inspected twelve cars for the first time for the GWG.

=== 2023 convention ===
The 2023 convention was head at the Chateau Frontenac, Quebec City, Canada. The convention attracted 94 registered members and was chaired by Gina and Peter Starr. In a Thursday Tech Session, representatives from Hagerty discussed market trends related to the 300SL. Board member Robert Webster, presented his highly modified 300SL. Additionally, board member Paul Devers conducted a presentation on the SLS. Board member Craig Mclaughlin stepped down from the GWG board of directors after 6 years as a board member and Amir Almagor stepped down from the board after 8 years as a member of the board. Molly Dunne and Ed Knoll were elected to the board. President John Willott stepped down from the board of directors after 6 years in office and David Dukehart was elected president.

=== 2024 convention ===
At its first-ever spring convention at the Ojai Valley Inn, the Gull Wing Group drew 138 participants, including a record 42 first-time attendees. Programming included a technical session, a panel emphasizing brake upkeep, a Friday rally across Santa Barbara County, and an indoor swap meet. The car show assembled 28 300 SLs and 9 SLSs. The weekend concluded with an anniversary-themed awards dinner and plans for the 56th convention on Vancouver Island, July 9–13.

=== 2025 convention ===
In July 2025, the Gull Wing Group held its annual convention in Victoria, British Columbia. The event featured six Mercedes-Benz AMG SLS models (produced 2010–2015), which continue the gull-wing door tradition of the original 300 SL.

As part of the celebration, Mercedes-Benz Heritage shipped a rare 1955 W196S 300 SLR racing car to Vancouver Island. The car, one of only two in existence, was displayed at the convention and served as a gesture of recognition from the automaker for the Group’s ongoing dedication to preserving the marque’s history.

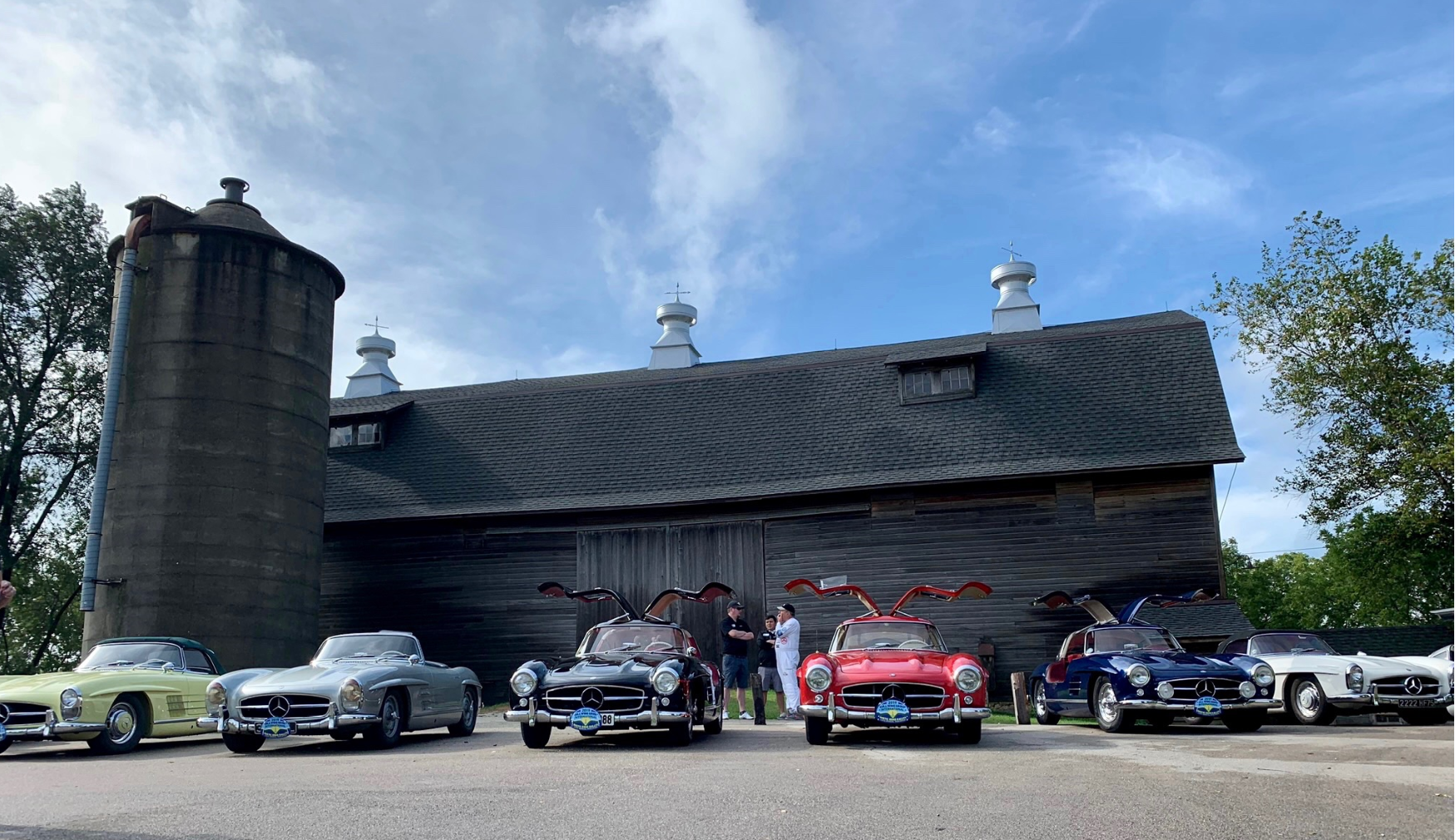
2019 GWG Convention in Lake Geneva, Wisconsin

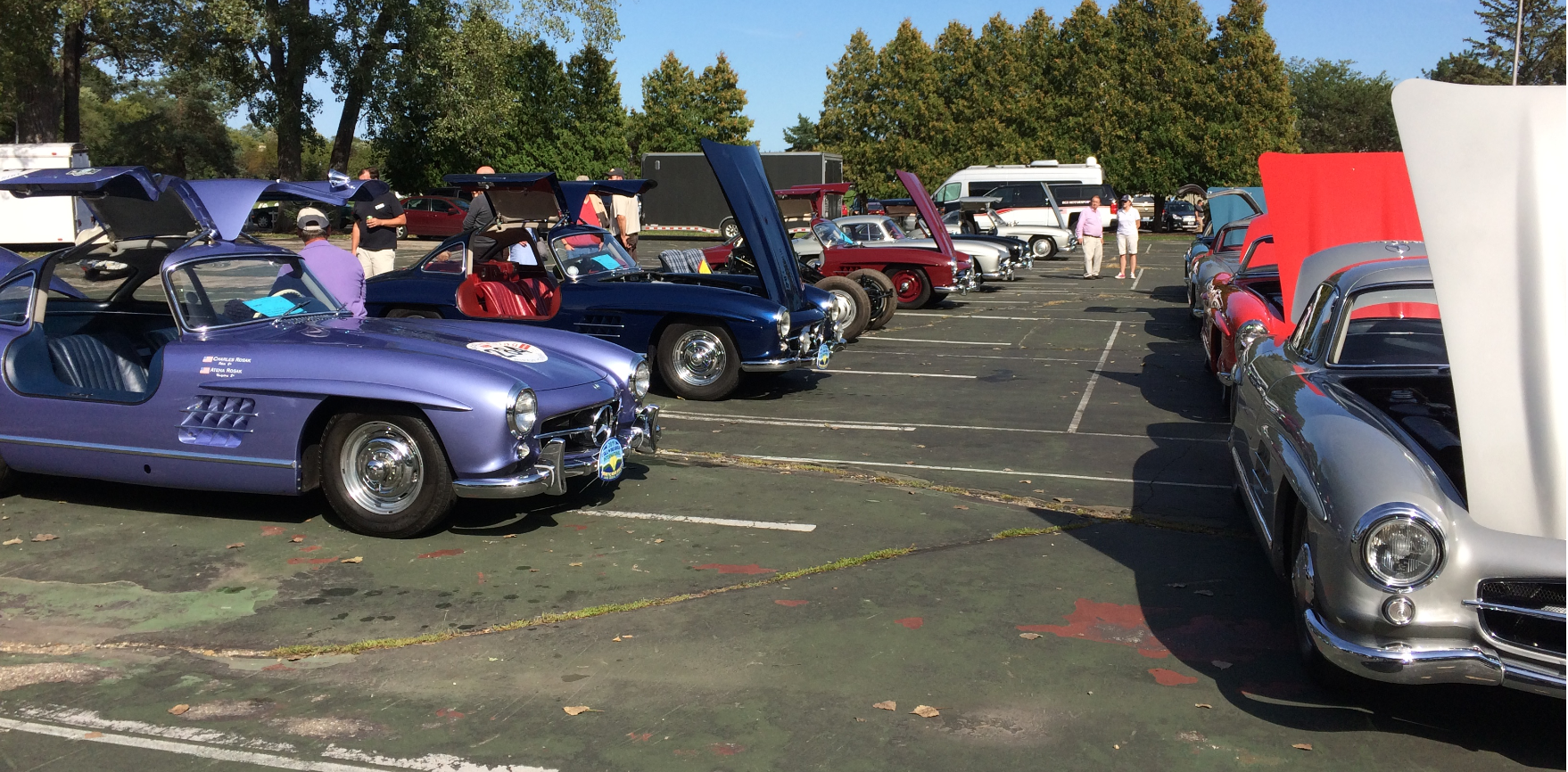
2019 GWG Convention line up

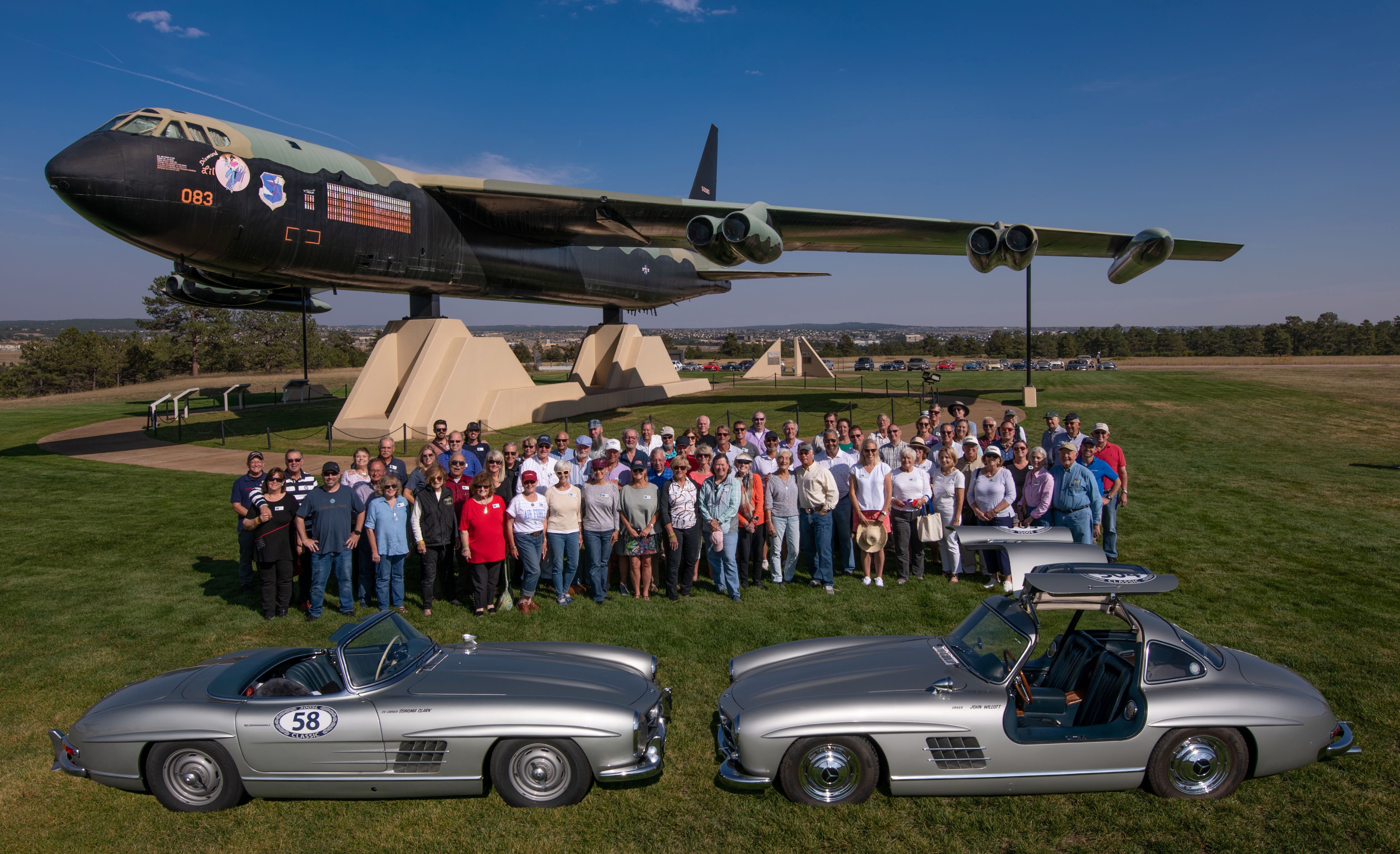
Gullwing group convention 2021 with B-52 plane and 300 SL cars

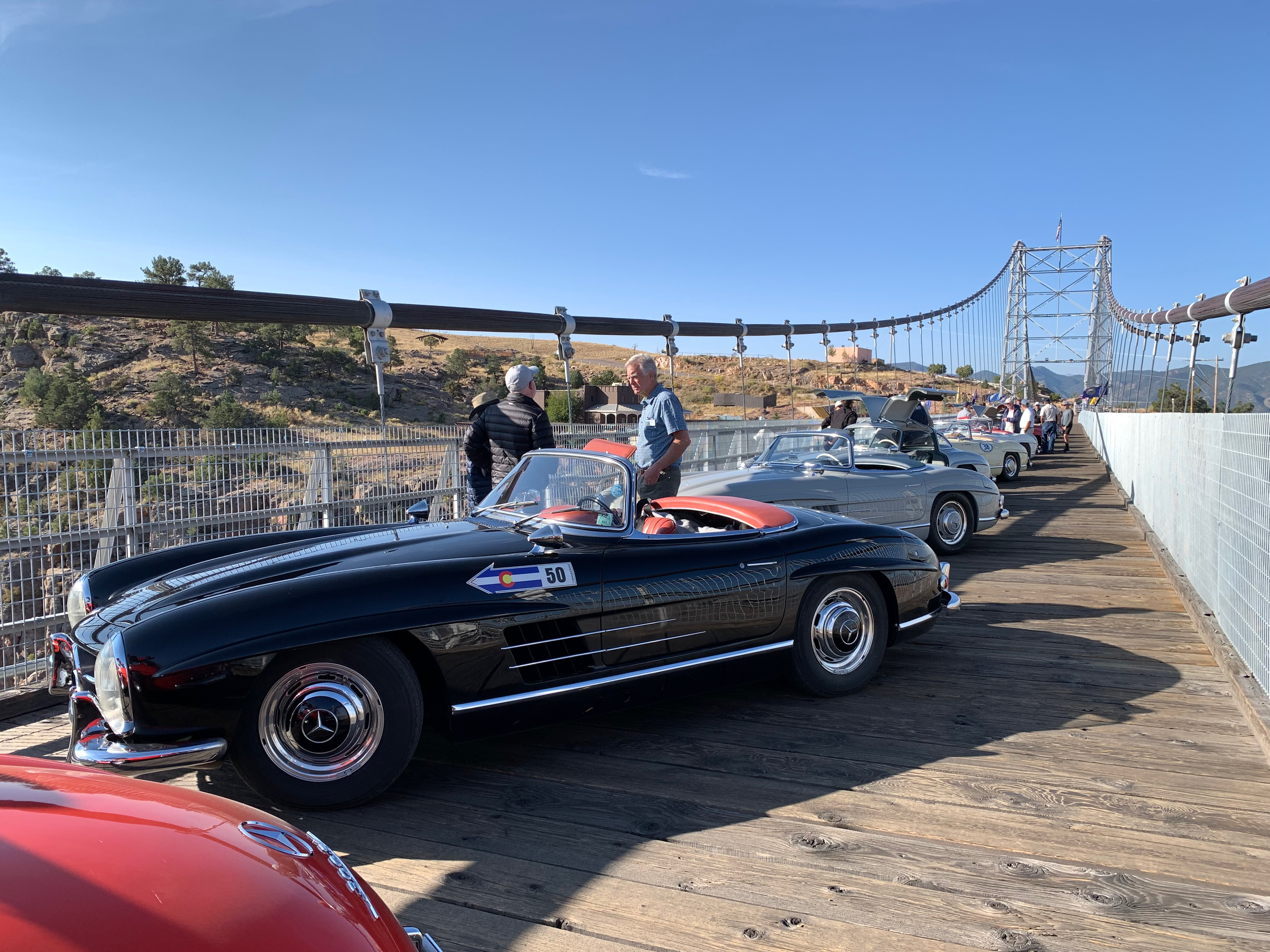
Gullwing group convention 2021 with 300 SL cars near bridge

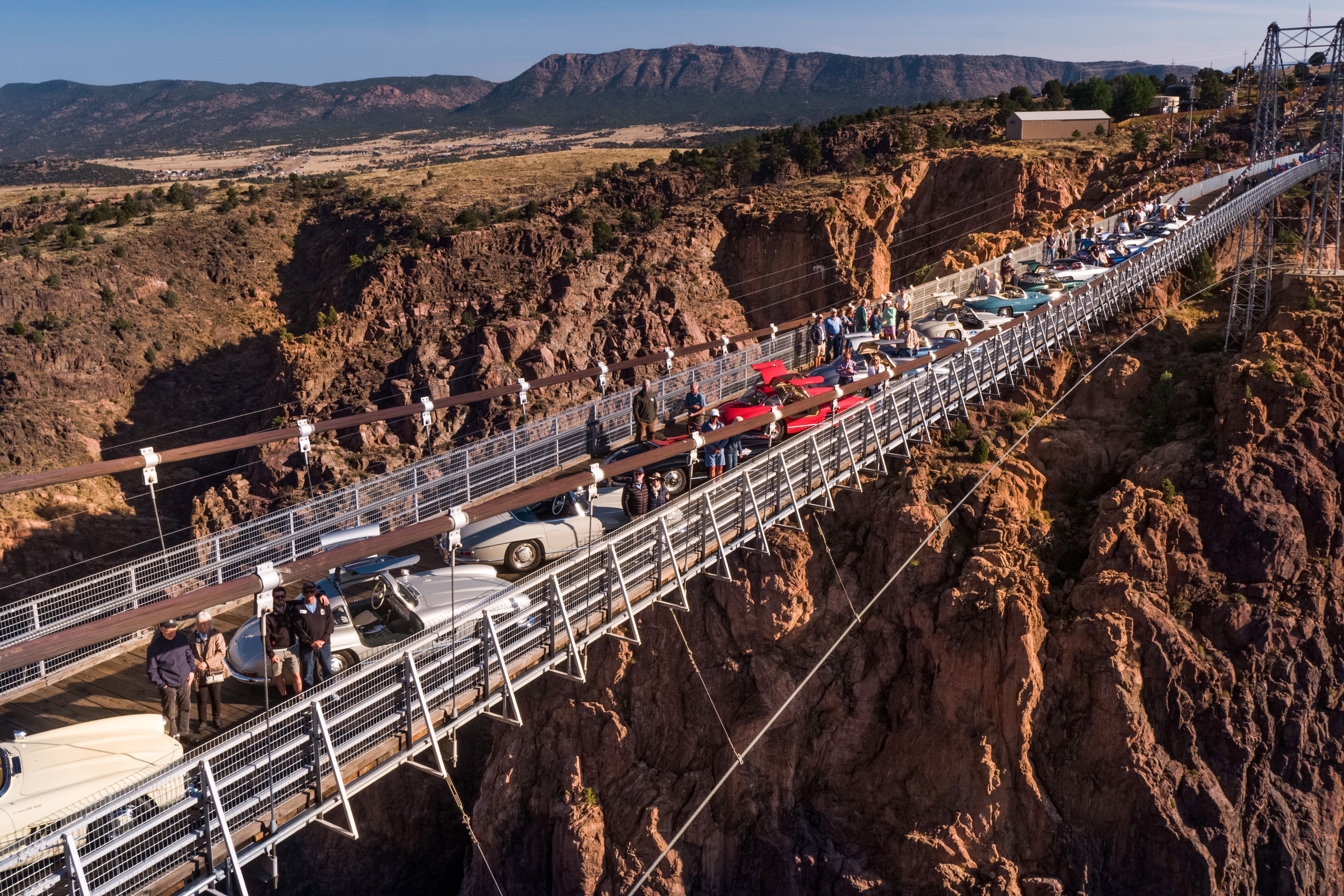
Gullwing group convention 2021 with 300 SL cars on bridge

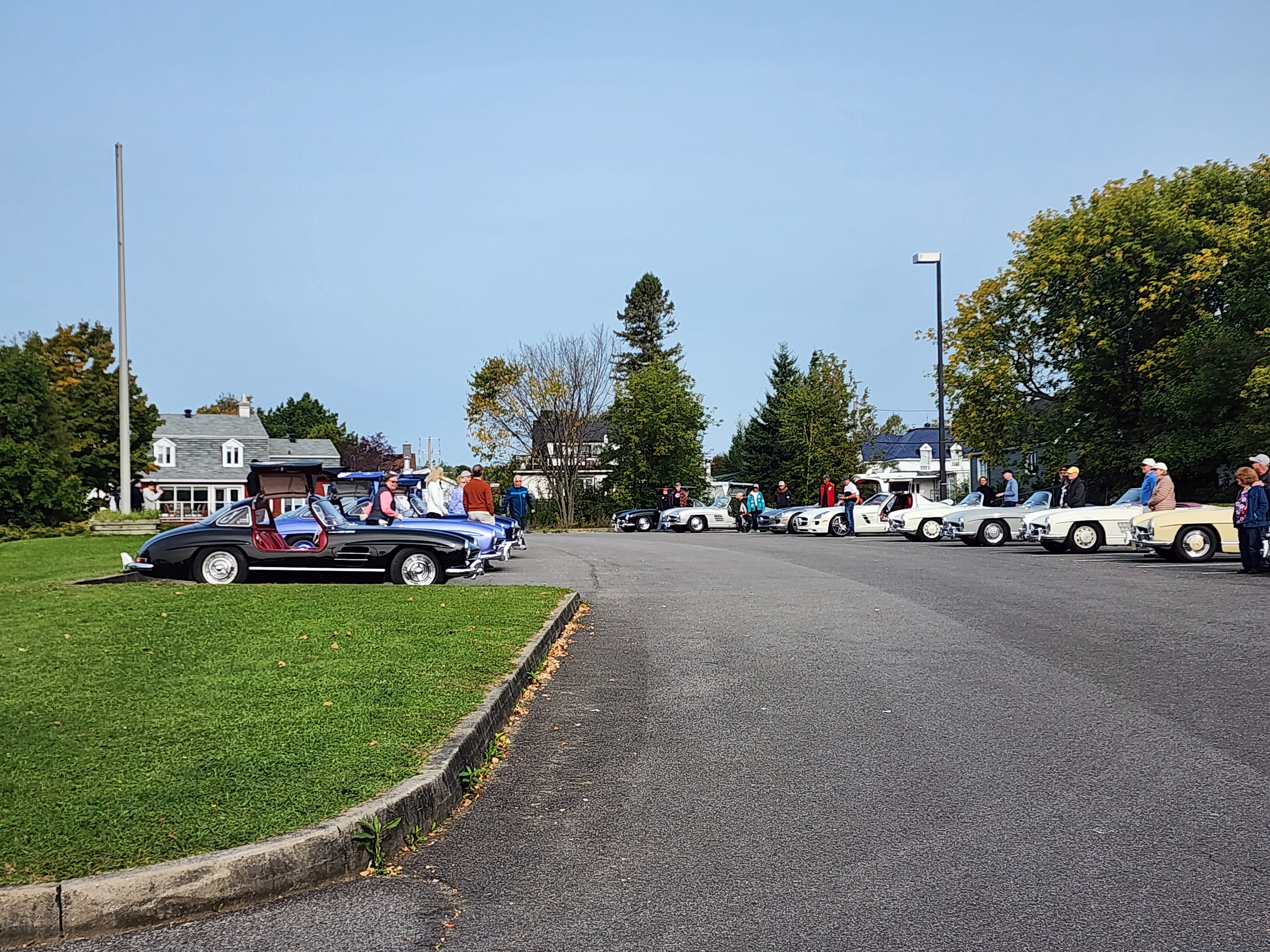
Group photo at the Quebec City 2023 Convention rally

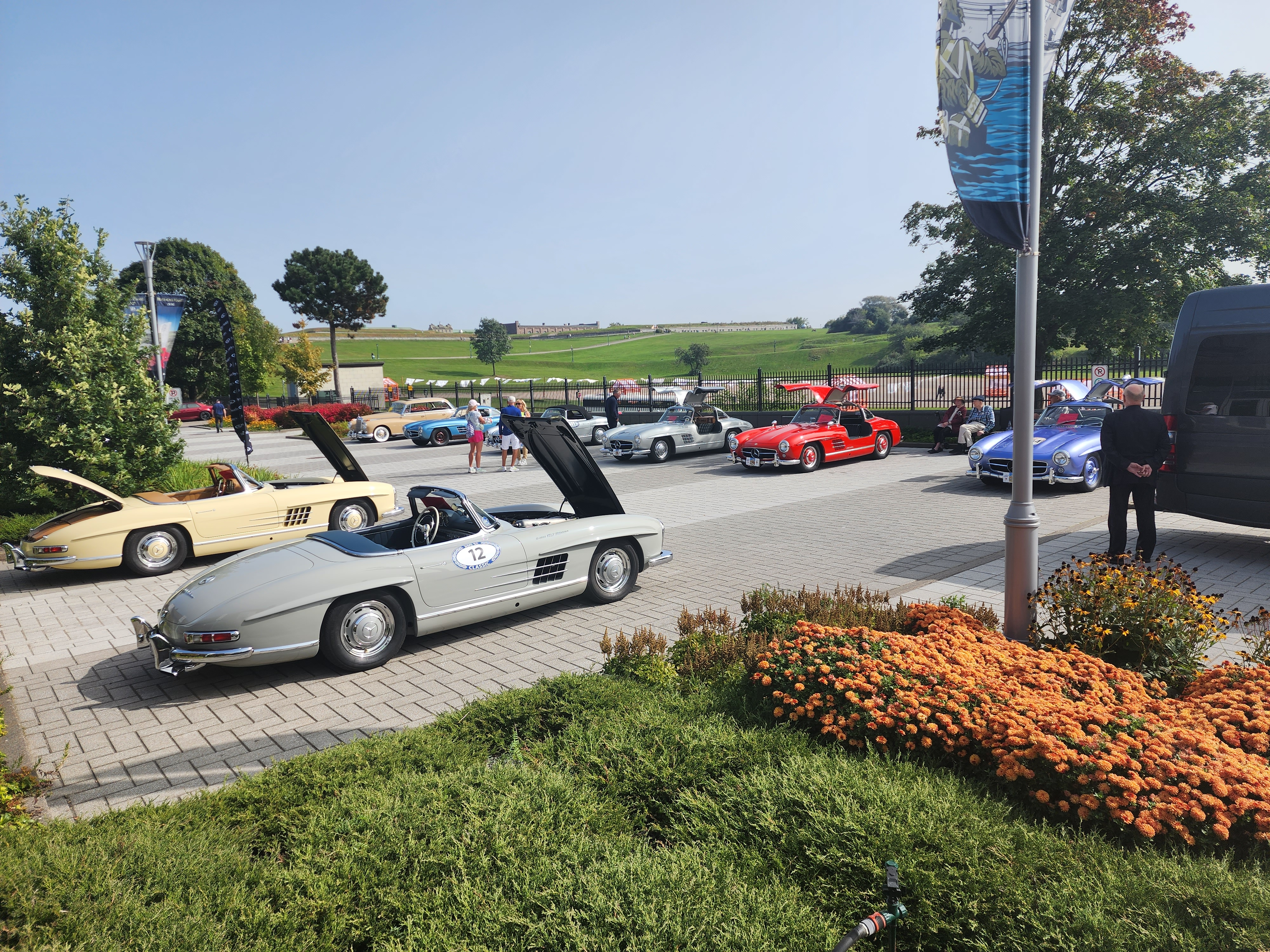
2023 Gullwing Group Saturday car show
