= George William Burton =

Canadian lawyer and judge

The Honourable Sir George William Burton
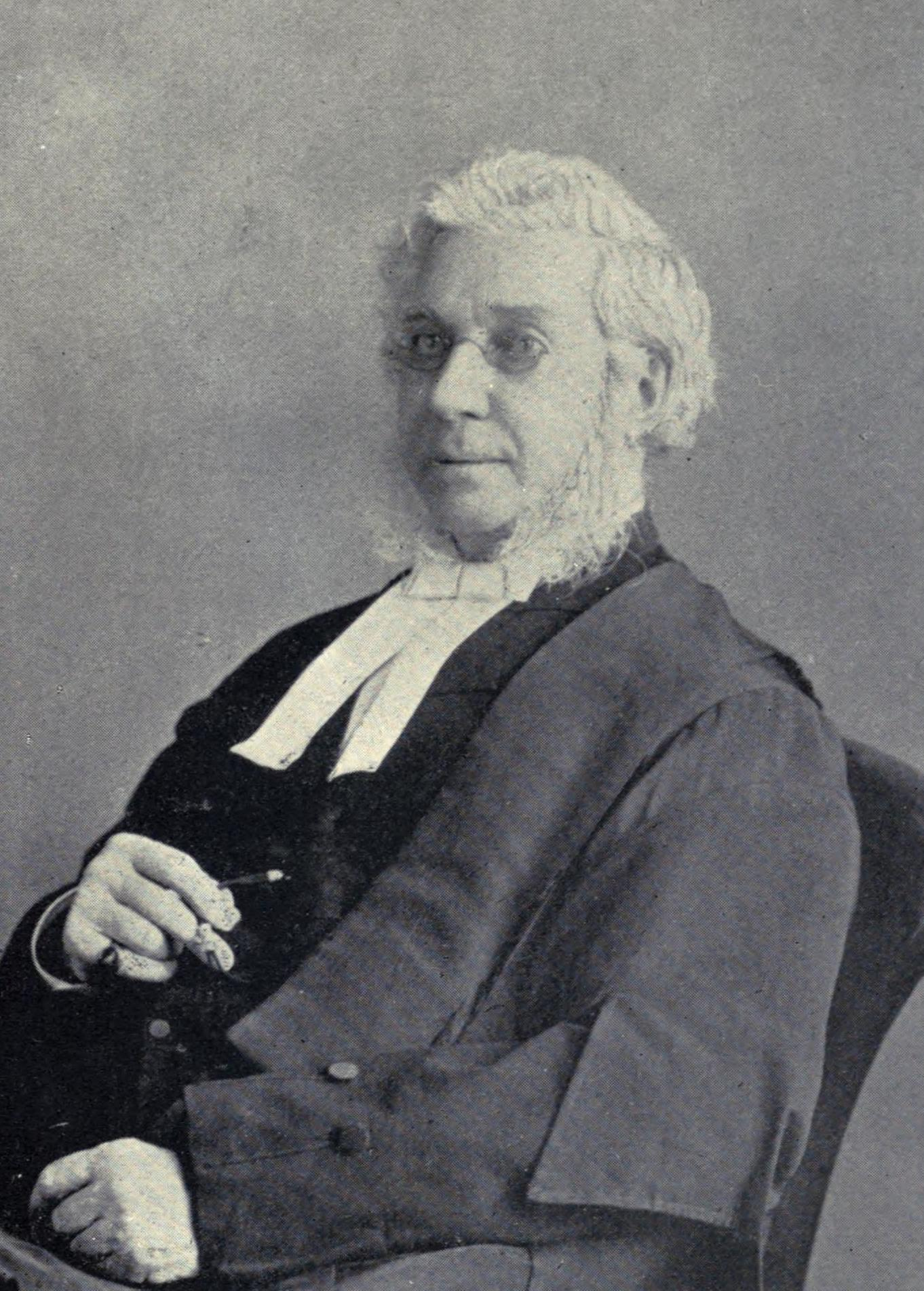

Chief Justice of Ontario
- In office 1897–1900
- Preceded by: Sir John Hawkins Hagarty
- Succeeded by: John Douglas Armour

Personal details
- Born: Sandwich, Kent, England
- Died: Toronto, Ontario, Canada

Sir George William Burton (July 21, 1818 – August 22, 1901) was a British-Canadian lawyer and judge. He was Chief Justice of Ontario from 1897 to 1900.

== Biography ==
Burton was born in Sandwich, Kent, England, on July 21, 1818, the second son of Admiral George Guy Burton, Royal Navy. He was educated at the Rochester and Chatham Proprietary School. In 1836 or 1837, Burton came to Canada and settled in Ingersoll, where he began studying law in the office of his paternal uncle, Edmund Burton. He was called to the bar in 1841 or 1842. Thereafter, he practised law in Hamilton. Burton also practised in partnership with Charles A. Sadleir, as Burton & Sadleir, for many years.

He was a reformer in politics.

On June 9, 1850, Burton married Elizabeth Perkins, daughter of Dr. F. Perkins, of Kingston, Jamaica, and niece and adopted daughter of Colonel Charles Cranston Dixon, of the 90th Regiment.

Burton acted as solicitor for the city of Hamilton; also for the Canada Life Assurance Company, of which he was a director, having been elected to that position soon after his elevation to the bench. In 1856 he was nominated as bencher of the Law Society of Upper Canada, and when that body became elective by the profession at large, under an Ontario statute passed in 1871, he was elected to the position. In 1862 or 1863, he was named a Queen's Counsel.

Burton was appointed a judge of the Court of Error and Appeal on May 30, 1874, moving to Toronto, Ontario. Upon the elevation of Samuel Henry Strong to the Supreme Court of Canada, in October 1865, Burton became the senior justice of the Court of Appeal. Burton was appointed Chief Justice of Ontario in 1897 and was knighted in 1898. He died on August 22, 1901, in Toronto.
