= William Hagerty =

William or Bill Hagerty may refer to:

- William W. Hagerty (1916–1986), teacher, NASA adviser, and president of Drexel University
- Bill Hagerty (William Francis Hagerty IV, born 1959), United States senator, ambassador to Japan and economic consultant
- Bill Hagerty (newspaper editor), British newspaperman

== See also ==
- Hagerty (disambiguation)
- William (disambiguation)
- Will (disambiguation)
- Bill (disambiguation)
