= Clara Hagarty =

Canadian artist

Clara Sophia Hagarty
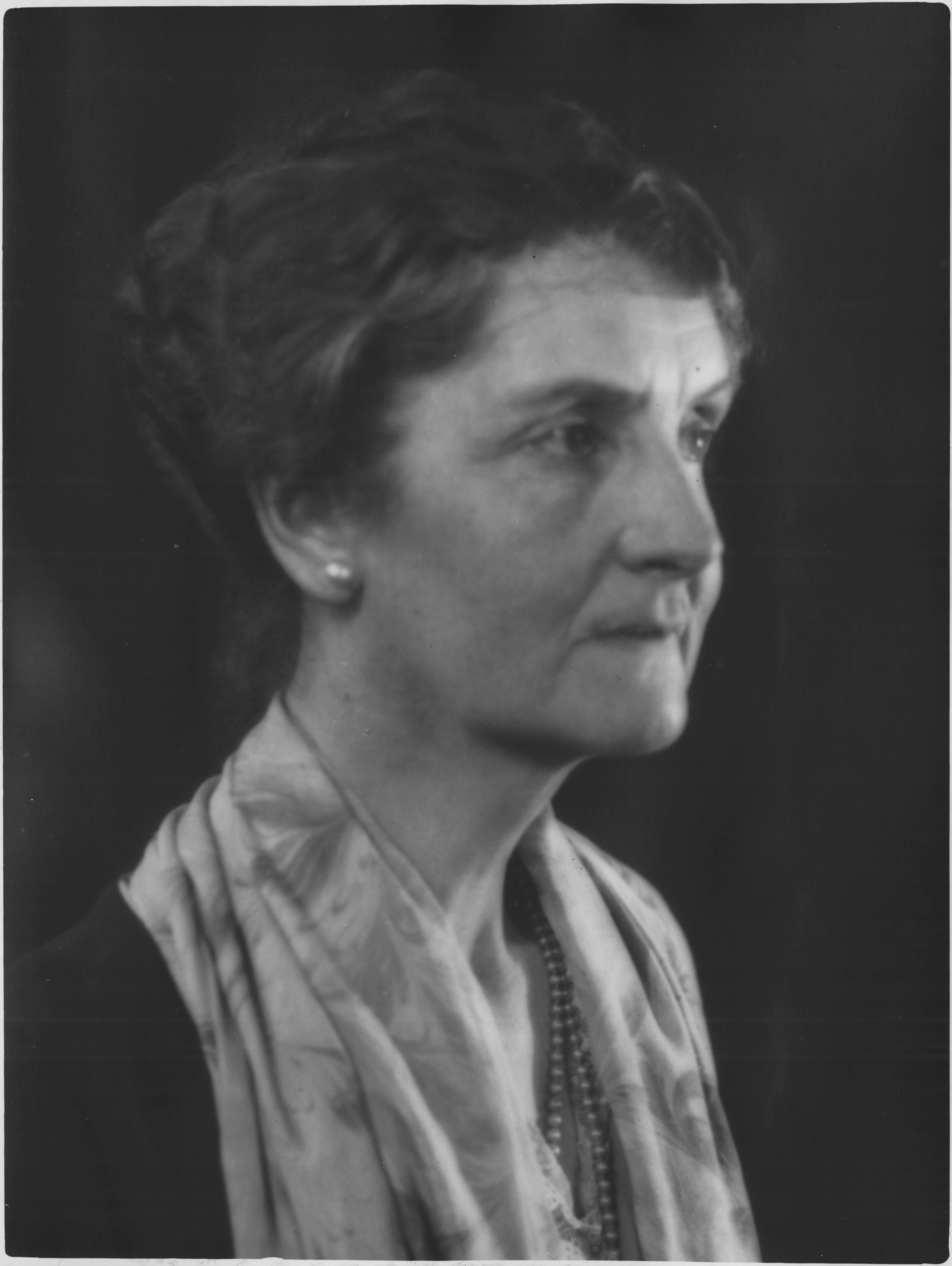
- Born: 1871; Toronto, Ontario, Canada
- Died: 1958 (aged 86–87); Toronto, Ontario, Canada
- Known for: Floral painter
- Elected: Royal Canadian Academy of Arts (1904)

Clara Sophia Hagarty RCA (1871–1958) was a Canadian artist. Hagarty worked with paints and pastels. She is best known for her paintings of flowers. She was elected to the Ontario Society of Artists in 1903, the Royal Canadian Academy of Arts in 1904. She studied in New Jersey, Paris, and the Netherlands. She spent World War I working for the Red Cross in London, and after the war worked at the Art Gallery of Toronto until 1928. She died in Toronto, Ontario in 1958.

== Childhood ==
She was born in Toronto. As the granddaughter of Sir John Hawkins Hagarty, a former Chief Justice of Ontario, she spent time at the family's "little English Mansion," amongst beautiful elm trees and grass lawns where she played plenty of tennis.

== Education ==
Clara Hagarty began her art education in Toronto under Sydney Strickland Tully and Edmund Wyly Grier. Following her studies in Toronto, Hagarty joined sketching classes at the Chase School, now known as Parsons The New School for Design in New York. Hagarty then travelled to Europe; studying in France, Italy, and the Netherlands. While in Paris, Hagarty was the student of Frederick William MacMonnies and Claudio Castelucho.

== Early works ==
Clara Hagarty's early works tended to focus on portraits and interiors. A number of these works were exhibited at the Pan-American Exposition in Buffalo in 1901.

== Exhibitions ==
Hagarty's pastel work and sketches in Italy, the Dolomites and Scotland were on exhibition at the T. Eaton Fine Art Galleries in Toronto. Her work was described as having a "lovely delicacy" and her skill with the "gradation of color" was noted. Works present, at the time, include: St. Peter's, Sunset, "Clover Fields, Cortina", The Alhambra, Spring, "Wisteria, Varenna", "A Bridge", "Field Flowers, Cortina", "Cypress Trees and Olives", and "Edinburgh Mist". Hagarty had approximately 85 sketches present. The pieces were inspired by Hagarty's trips to Europe between 1921 and 1925. Haggarty explained that her choice of pastels was because she perceived them to be cleaner than paints.

After returning from the Red Cross and taking up work at the Art Gallery of Toronto, Hagarty held a retrospective exhibition of her work in 1951. Hagarty produced less art as her sight began to deteriorate. In this exhibit she showed works that had never been seen before; such as oil paintings of Paris and the French countryside.
