= Stranton Grange Cemetery =

Cemetery in County Durham, England

Coordinates: 54.6664°N 1.2242°W

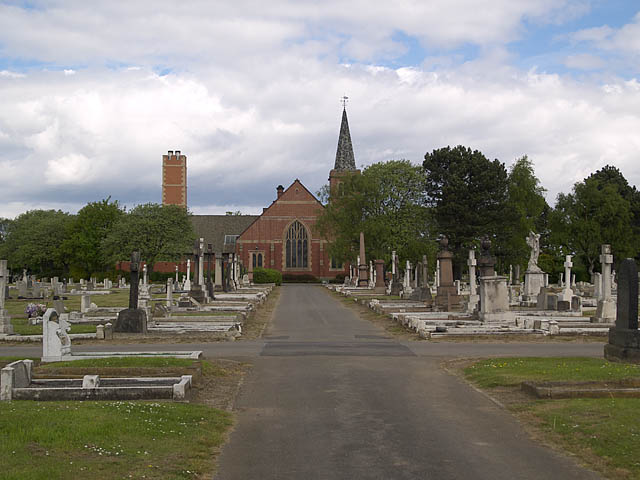
Stranton Grange cemetery, with Hartlepool Crematorium left of picture

Stranton Grange Cemetery is located in Tanfield Road, Stranton, Hartlepool. It is also the site of Hartlepool Crematorium. It opened in May 1912. It now covers over 30 acres in extent.

== War graves ==
The cemetery contains the war graves of 43 Commonwealth service personnel of the First World War and 132 of the Second World War. Those of the former war are scattered throughout the cemetery where, after that war, the Commonwealth War Graves Commission erected a Cross of Sacrifice in the main entrance of the cemetery. Early in the second war the local authorities set aside ground behind the Cross for war service burials, on which has grown the present War Graves Plot.

== Notable interments ==
- Theophilus Jones, age 29, Private, 18th Battalion, Durham Light Infantry, the first soldier to die on English soil as a result of enemy action in 200 years when the Hartlepool was bombarded by German ships in 1914.
- Dick Hegarty, professional footballer, Sergeant, Royal Field Artillery, died of wounds 1917.
