= Norah M. Holland =

Canadian writer (1876–1925)

Norah M. Holland Claxton
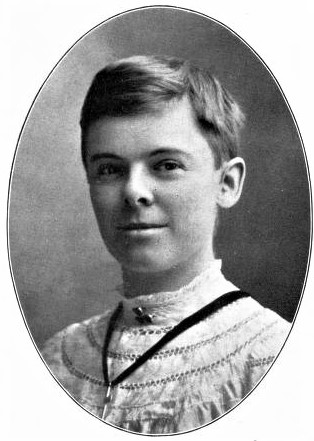
- Born: Honorah Mary Holland; January 10, 1876; Collingwood, Ontario, Canada
- Died: April 27, 1925 (aged 49); Toronto, Canada
- Resting place: St. John's Cemetery, Toronto
- Education: Port Dover Collegiate Institute; Parkdale Collegiate Institute
- Occupations: Writer; journalist; editor
- Spouse: Lionel William Claxton (m. 1922)
- Relatives: John Hawkins Hagarty; W. B. Yeats; John Butler Yeats
- Writing career
- Language: English

Signature
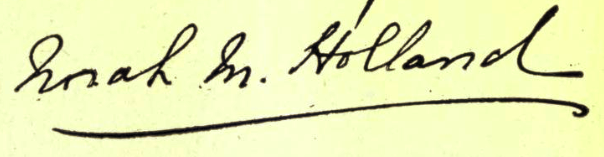

Norah M. Holland (after marriage, Claxton; January 10, 1876 – April 27, 1925) was a Canadian poet, playwright, journalist, and editor. She was a contributor to the Canadian Courier, The Canadian Magazine, Toronto Daily News, and The Globe. During Holland's travels in Ireland and England in 1904, she stayed with John Butler Yeats, and he drew a sketch of her. Holland died in 1925.

== Biography ==
Honorah Mary Holland was born in Collingwood, Ontario, January 10, 1876. Her parental ancestors were from County Sligo, Ireland. Her father was John Hawkins Holland (1841–1923), and on his side, she was a grandniece of Chief Justice of Ontario John Hawkins Hagarty; her mother, Elizabeth (Yeats) Holland, was a first cousin of W. B. Yeats, the Irish poet.

Holland was educated in the public schools of her native town and in the Port Dover and Parkdale Collegiate Institutes.

Since 1889, Holland was a resident of Toronto. For eight years, she was on the staff of the Dominion Press Clipping Bureau, the Toronto Daily News, assistant editor of the Canadian Courier, and with the Macmillan Company of Canada.

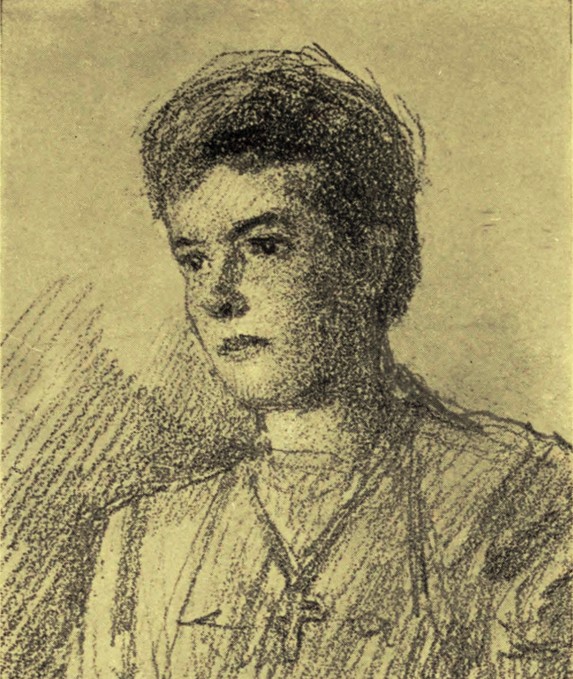
"Norah M. Holland" by John Butler Yeats, 1904

During 1904, she made an extended journey on foot through the south and west of Ireland and in England gathering at first hand a great accumulation of Irish folklore.

In 1922, she married Lionel William Claxton, a writer of tales and poems. She died in Toronto of tuberculosis on April 27, 1925, and is buried at St. John's Cemetery, Toronto. The Toronto Globe in announcing her death paid the following tribute to her personality and work:

To readers of poetry the one who is gone will be always Norah Holland, the weaver of exquisite verse. A lover of children, a friend of dumb animals, and a staunch, stimulating comrade to numerous wayfarers who crossed her path, she touched life at many points and wrote inspiringly of its different phases. Her two books of verse, Spunyarn and Spindrift and When Half Gods Go, remain as monuments to her genius, and fascinating fairy stories proclaim her the friend of little children and a firm believer in that charming world of fancy unknown to the materialist.

== Selected works ==
=== Poetry collections ===
- Spun-yarn and Spindrift, 1918
- When Half-gods Go, and Other Poems, 1924

=== Drama ===
- When Half Gods Go (allegorical poetic drama, 1928)

=== Poems ===
- "Captains Adventurous"
- "April in England"
- "Home Thoughts from Abroad"
- "Sea Song"
- "To W.B. Yeats"
