= Upper Beaches =

- Neighbourhood
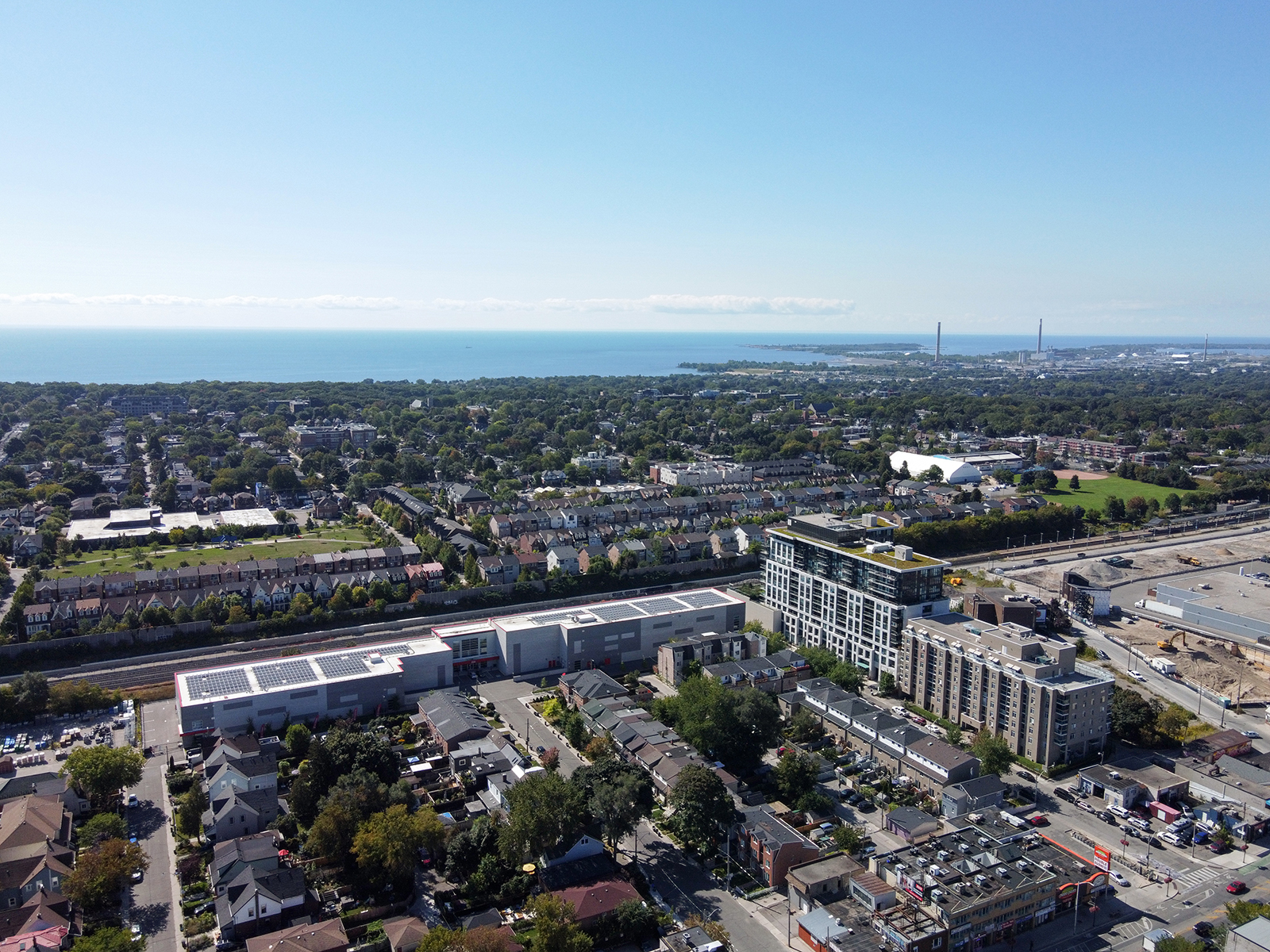
- Aerial view of Upper Beaches in 2023

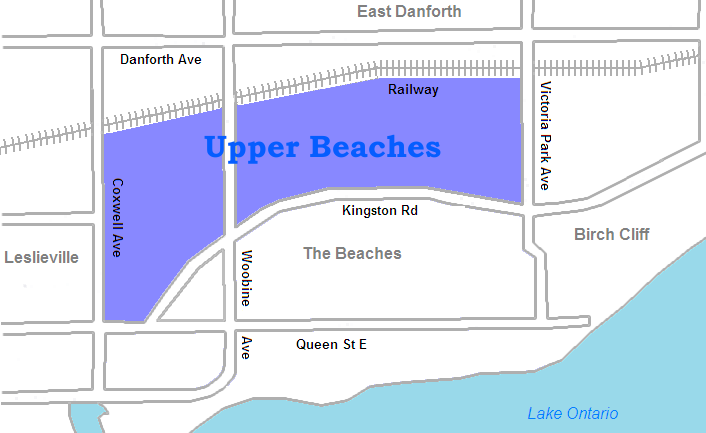
- Map of Upper Beaches

- Location within Toronto
- Coordinates: 43°40′56″N 79°18′12″W
- Country: Canada
- Province: Ontario
- City: Toronto
- Community: Toronto & East York
- Established: 'Norway'
- Changed Municipality: 1888 East Toronto from York; 1908 Toronto (former) from East Toronto; 1998 Toronto from Toronto (former)

Government
  - MP: Nathaniel Erskine-Smith (Beaches-East York)
  - MPP: Mary-Margaret McMahon (Beaches-East York)
  - Councillor: Brad Bradford (Ward 19 (Beaches-East York))

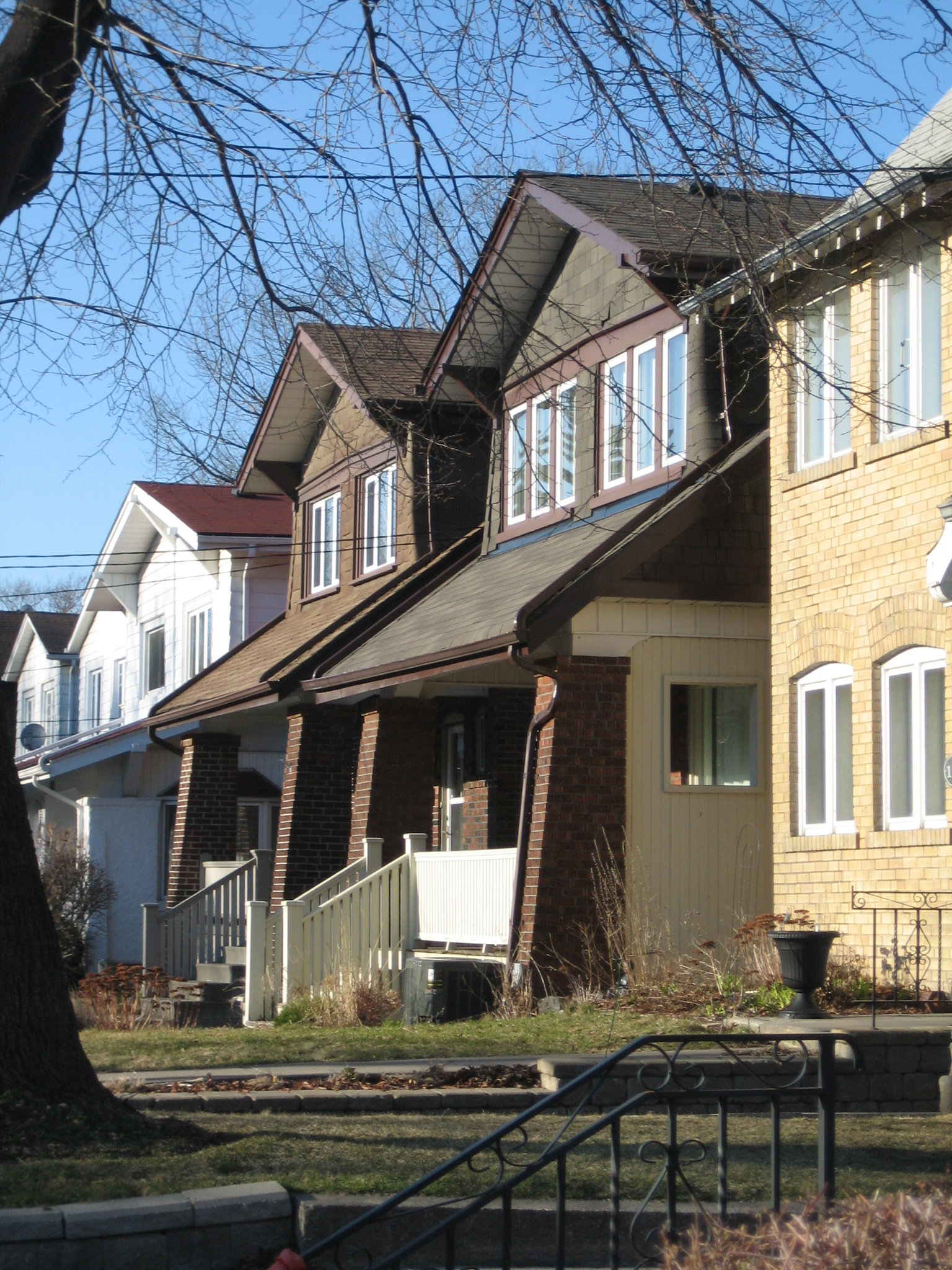
Typical houses in the Upper Beaches

The Upper Beaches is a neighbourhood in Toronto, Ontario, Canada. It is directly north of the Beaches area. It stretches from Coxwell Avenue in the west to Victoria Park in the east. The southern border is Kingston Road, while the northern boundary is generally considered to be the Canadian National Railway tracks between Gerrard Street and Danforth Avenue. The western part of the area was originally called Norway, and the larger area was once part of the Town of East Toronto. The name "Upper Beaches" was first used by developers and real estate agents around the period of 2001 to 2003 for the selling of houses on redeveloped land in the area, and was used as a marketing tag to attract buyers. The area was never considered part of the Beaches neighbourhood but was close to it. The city's current name for this area is East End Danforth, though that is rarely used. The city also includes the buildings along and just north of Danforth Avenue in the neighbourhood. The western portion between Woodbine Avenue and Coxwell is referred to by the city as Woodbine Corridor.

== History ==
=== Norway ===
Predating development along Toronto's Beaches, Norway was a postal village in what is today the eastern part of Toronto. There is no evidence of Norwegian settlement in the area. Rather, the name likely comes from the Norway Pines that dominated in the region, and whose harvesting was one of the main industries for the community. The most prominent landowner in the area was Charles Coxwell Small, who tried strenuously to have the town renamed to Berkeley, after his hometown in Britain. The name Norway stuck.

The village's post office was originally a wooden structure built in 1825, today the site of 320 Kingston Road. The Norway Steam Mills, a steam powered saw mill began operations in 1835 near Woodbine and Kingston Road, established by the iron mongers Wragg & Co., who advertised Norway pine as a specialty.

A toll gate resided at the Woodbine and Kingston Road. To the dismay of travelers, tolls were common along the stretch of Kingston Road during the 1800s as they funded the upkeep of the popular route from Toronto to Kingston, Ontario. It was main east-west land route through what was then defined as Upper Canada.

The community grew up in the 1840s around the toll station, saw mill and postal office becoming a popular stagecoach stop. The community was then at a distance of about 5 miles from the city at Woodbine, in a still largely wooded area. By 1850, the village's population had reached 100. At this point, the village also included a few inns, three taverns, a school and a blacksmith’s shop.

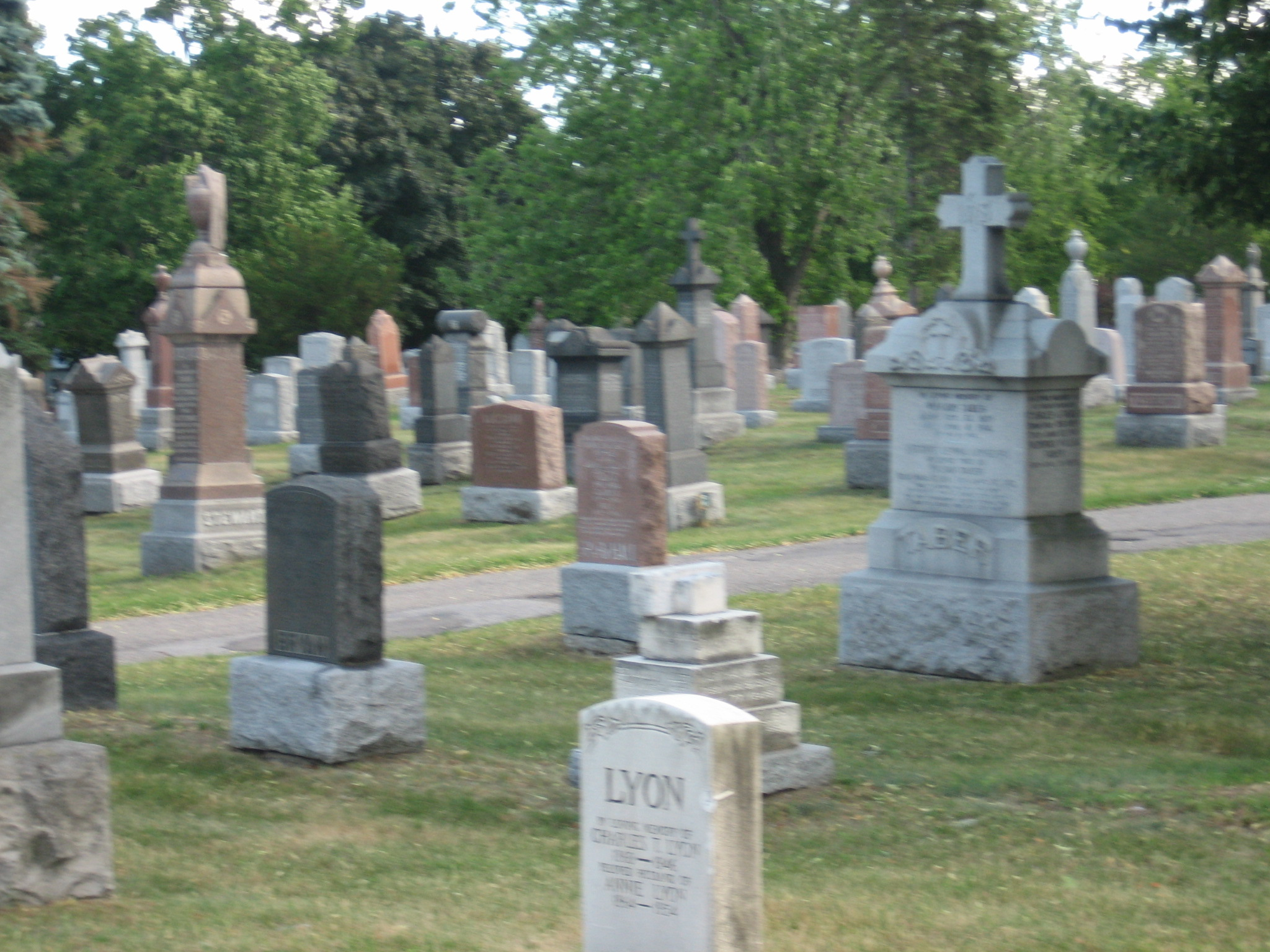
St. John's Norway Cemetery, established in the area in 1853

One of the popular inns was The Norway House Hotel, standing on the south side of Kingston Road just east of Woodbine Avenue and was typical of many hotels in the suburbs of Toronto, heavily patronized by farmers on their way to and from market. Another was James Shaw's Hotel and Tavern, described as a long low building painted dazzling white with green shutters.

In 1850 Charles Coxwell Small had donated 3 acres of land to be used for St John's Church, Berkeley. His church was a wooden structure built in 1850 and served the Anglican community. In 1853 a cemetery was added to the property. In 1893 the brick structure that resides in place today was constructed and the church was renamed St. John's Cemetery Norway.

In 1909 The Village of Norway was annexed to the expanding City of Toronto, one year after its neighbour to the east, East Toronto. The Village of Norway has long since been fully engulfed by the City of Toronto. Its name does persist in a number of places, including Norway Avenue, and the nearby Norway Public School. St. John the Baptist Norway Anglican Church, the attached St. John's Cemetery Norway were named after Canada's original patron; the later St John's Roman Catholic church and school also preserve the name.

=== Midway and the Toronto Golf Club ===
Midway was a name given to the open land north of Dundas Street and Kingston Road (an approximation as there were no distinct boundaries in place) between Toronto's city limits of Greenwood Avenue and the Town of East Toronto. As its name suggests, it was the midway point between these two townships. The area consisted primarily of farming land, much of which was vacant.

In year 1876, the Toronto Golf Club had taken up residence in some of this open space between Woodbine and Coxwell, known then as the Fernhill property sitting just to the northwest of The Village of Norway. City maps of the Toronto Suburbs from 1884 also identify the land the Golf Club occupied to be owned by the Dominion Telephone Company in one portion, and a second portion owned by likely a private citizen named Fitzgerald. It was the third oldest Golf Club in Canadian history and it hosted the Canadian open at this location twice in its history (1905 and 1909). Initially, the club did not have an official clubhouse and members would typically pack a lunch that they would usually eat while sitting beneath one of the property's trees. In the early 1880s, the Club obtained the use of two rooms in a house near to the course. In 1894 they renovated a deserted old mansion on the property, locally said to be haunted, into their official clubhouse.

The areas of Midway and Norway continued to grow heading towards the 1900s, becoming increasingly crowded. A lack of adequate sewage systems caused many illnesses and the schools were becoming crowded. Feeling boxed in by an encroaching population, the Toronto Golf Club sought a new residence and sold their land on advantageous terms. They moved out in 1909 to Toronto's west end and home of their present site.

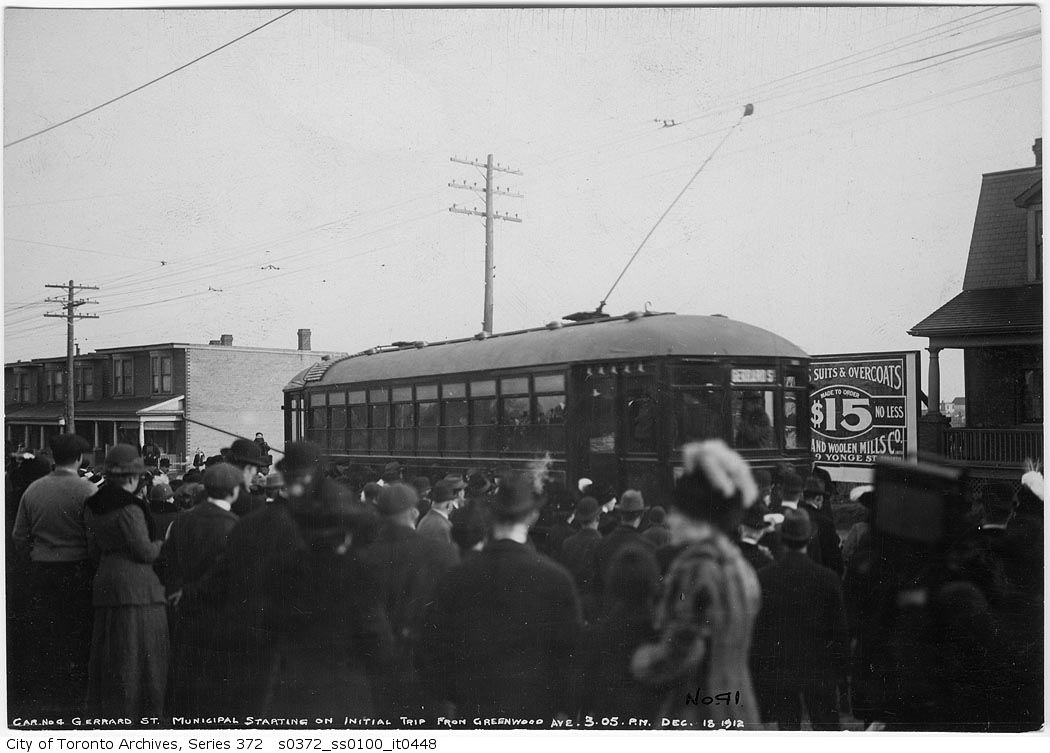
Crowds in the Upper Beaches waiting to board the first Toronto Civic Railways streetcar on Gerrard Street in 1912

In 1909 Midway and Norway were officially annexed to the growing City of Toronto. The Toronto Civic Railways would construct a streetcar line stretching between Greenwood to East Toronto's Main Street that would open in 1912. The line along Gerrard Street East, turning north on Coxwell and re-continuing east on a footpath used by the former golf club, now (Upper) Gerrard Street East. This route still exists today as the TTC 506 Carlton streetcar.

The new owners of the former golf club were a land developers by the name of Robin's Group. They renamed the developing area Kelvin Park, posting regular ads in The Globe and Mail selling parcels of land perfect for the construction of new homes. They set up a sales office on Gerrard and Greenwood and offer to drive prospective buyers from the office to Kelvin Park. In their ads, they offer plots of land for sale touting the recent installation of the Toronto Civic Railways line along with the scenic view of the lake, picturesque glens and winding stream fringed with beautiful trees. These ads ran until 1913.

=== Town of East Toronto ===
A large part of the neighbourhood was laid out later as the residential heart of the short-lived Town of East Toronto. The area was also home to a number of industrial sites alongside the rail line, which runs just north of Gerrard. Today almost all of the industry has been replaced by housing.

== Education ==
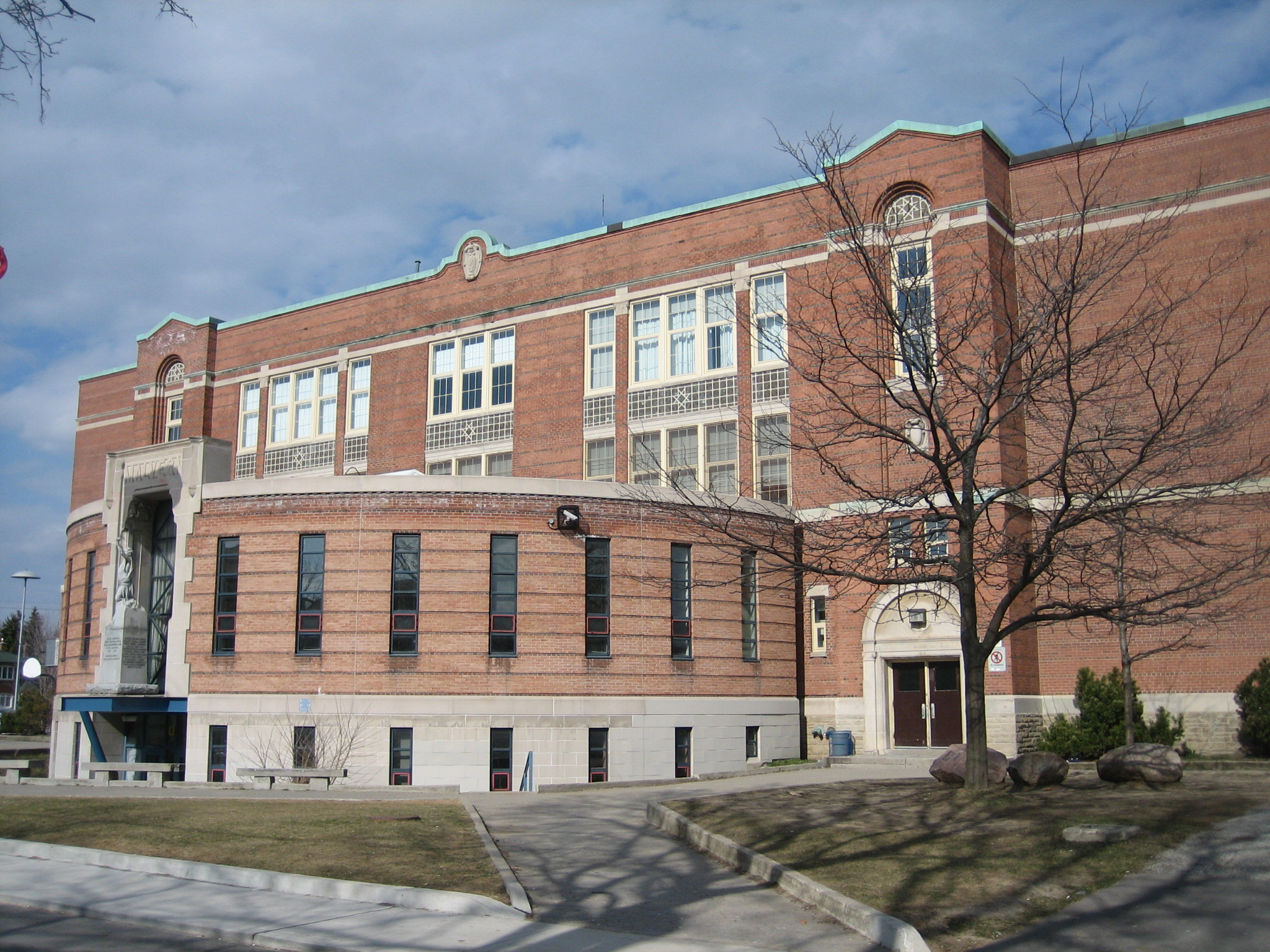
Malvern Collegiate Institute, a public secondary school located in the neighbourhood

Three public school boards operate schools in the Upper Beaches, the Conseil scolaire catholique MonAvenir (CSCM), the Toronto Catholic District School Board (TCDSB), and the Toronto District School Board (TDSB). TDSB is a secular public school board, whereas CSCM and TCDSB are separate public school board, the former being a French first language school board.

TCDSB and TDSB are the only school boards that operate a secondary school in the area. Malvern Collegiate Institute is a secondary school operated by TDSB, whereas Notre Dame High School is a secondary school operated by TCDSB.

Malvern Collegiate Institute has been recognized by Toronto Life Magazine for having one of the strongest English and Theatre programs in the TDSB. Under the direction of Eric Lehrer, the theatre program has earned an excellent reputation for its annual Docudrama festival and year-end productions.

Public elementary schools in the Upper Beaches include:

- Adam Beck Junior Public School (TDSB)
- Bowmore Road Junior and Senior Public School (TDSB)
- École élémentaire catholique George-Étienne-Cartier (CSCM)
- Kimberley Junior Public School (TDSB)
- Norway Junior Public School (TDSB)

== Transportation ==
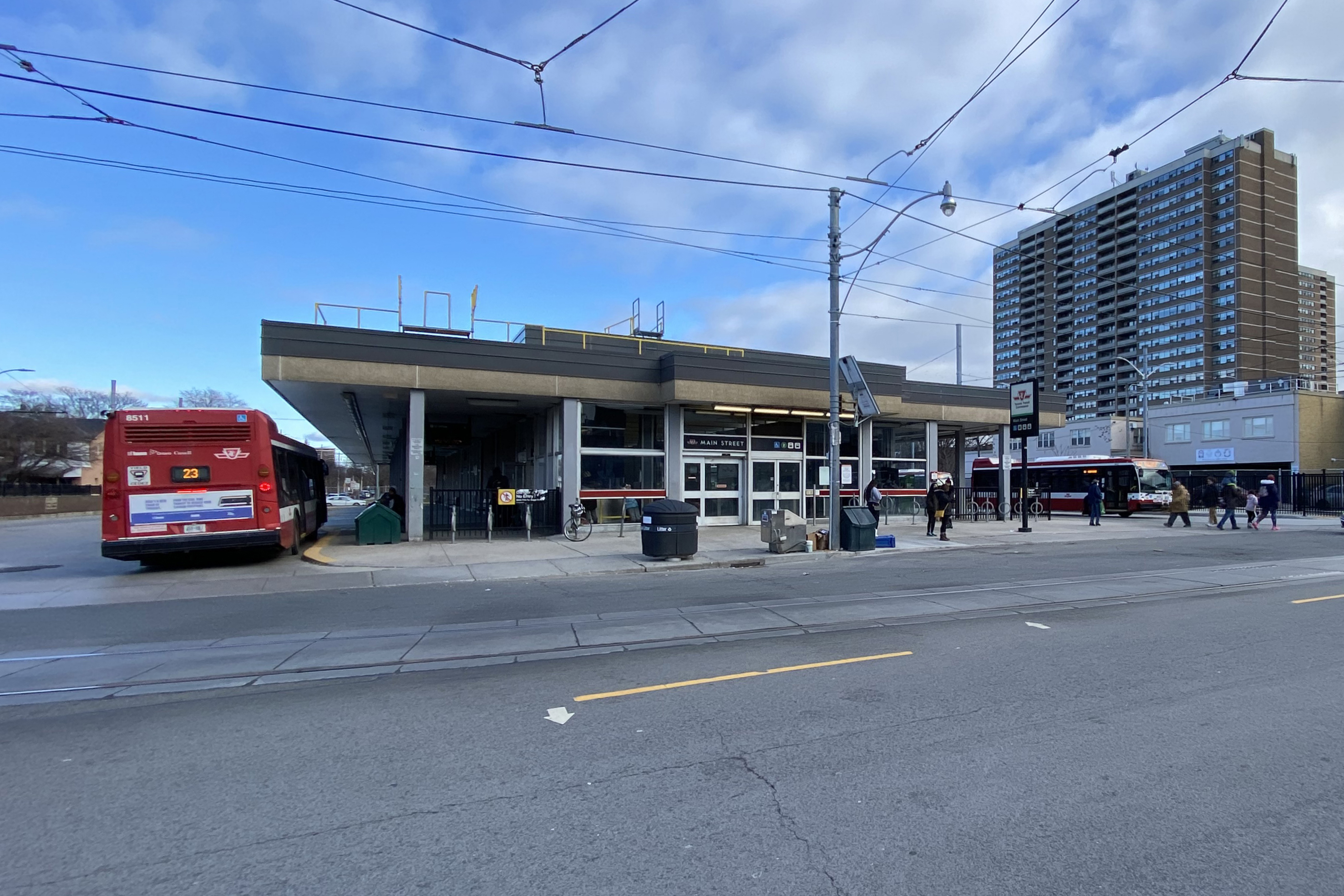
Main Street station, a stop for the Line 2 Bloor-Danforth subway line, as well as the eastern terminus for the 506 Carlton streetcar line

The Toronto Transit Commission (TTC) operates two Toronto streetcar system lines in the area, the 503 Kingston Rd, and the 506 Carlton streetcar lines. The 503 Kingston Rd operates along Kingston Road, whereas the 506 Carlton streetcar line operates along Gerrard Street (Toronto). The 506 Carlton's eastern terminus is located within the Upper Beaches, at Main Street station. The station provides connections to several routes operated by the TTC bus system, as well as Line 2 Bloor–Danforth of the Toronto subway system.
