= John Haggerty (disambiguation) =

John Haggerty (born 1960) is a guitarist.

John Haggerty or Hagerty may also refer to:

- John A. Haggerty (1841–1910), Wisconsin state legislator and businessman
- John B. Haggerty (1884–1953), American labor union leader
- John K. Hagerty (1867–1945), Pennsylvania state representative
- John Haggerty, New York political candidate who lost the 1920 United States House of Representatives elections
- John Haggerty, political candidate who lost the 2014 California Attorney General primary election
- John Haggerty (Canadian football), Canadian football punter
- Jack Hagerty (John Leo Hagerty, 1903–1982), American football player, coach and college athletics administrator

== See also ==
- John Hawkins Hagarty (1816–1900), Canadian lawyer, teacher and judge
- John Hegarty (disambiguation)
