= St. John's Norway Cemetery =

Cemetery in Ontario, Canada

St. John's Norway Cemetery and Crematorium
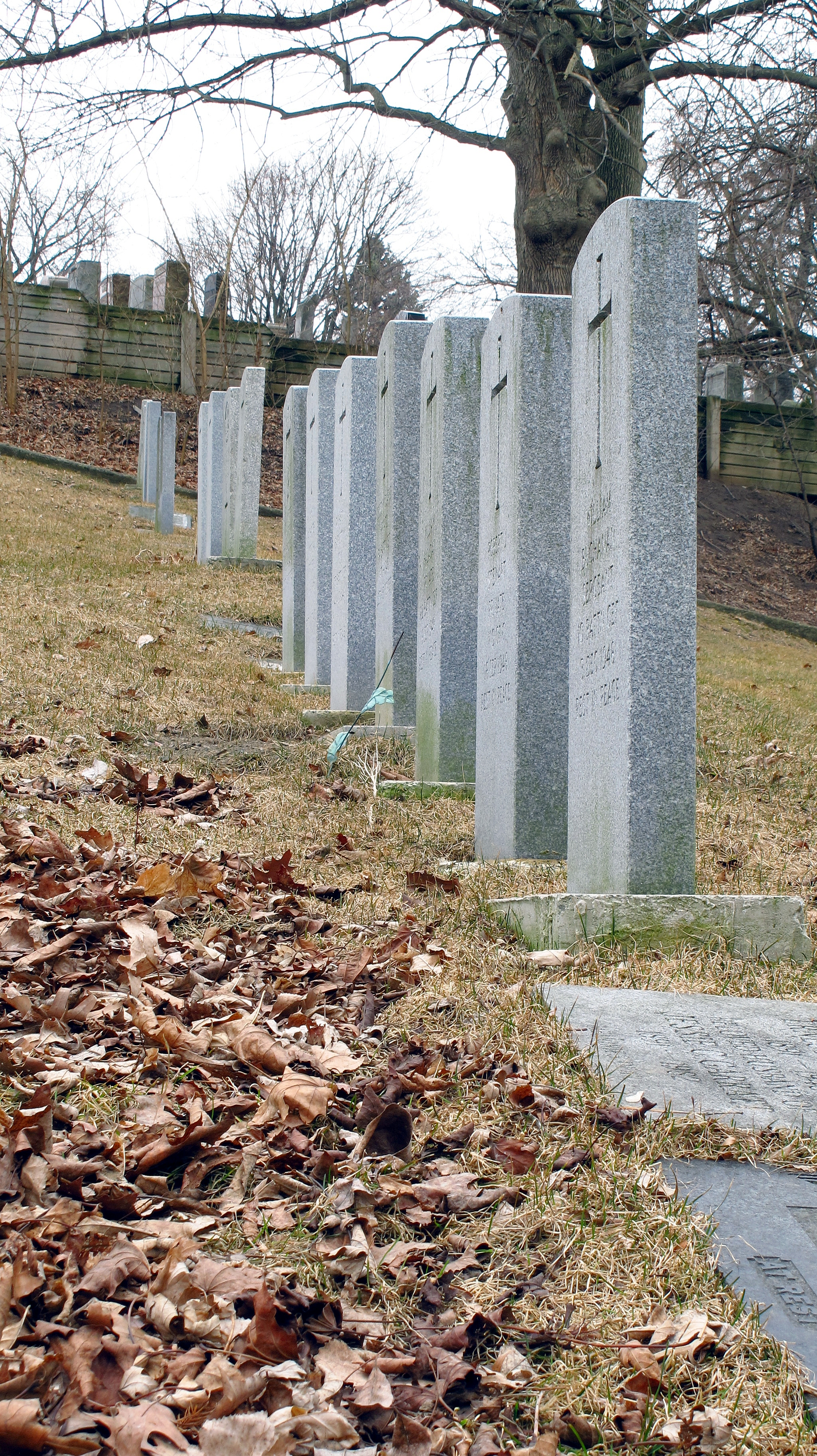
- Graves of soldiers killed in World War II
- Interactive map of St. John's Norway Cemetery and Crematorium

Details
- Established: 1853; 173 years ago
- Location: 256 Kingston Road; Toronto, Ontario; M4L 1S7
- Coordinates: 43°40′25″N 79°18′38″W
- Type: Public
- Style: non-denominational
- Owned by: St. John's the Baptist Norway Anglican Church
- Size: 35 acres (14 ha)
- No. of graves: 50,000
- No. of interments: over 80,000
- Website: Official website
- Find a Grave: St. John's Norway Cemetery and Crematorium

St. John's Norway Cemetery and Crematorium is a historic cemetery in Toronto, Ontario, Canada. It is located at the intersection of Kingston Road and Woodbine Avenue in the east end of the city just northwest of The Beaches neighbourhood.

== History ==
The cemetery was founded adjacent to St. John the Baptist Norway Anglican Church in 1853. Despite the use of the name "Norway", neither the church nor the cemetery has any connection to the country of Norway or to Norwegian immigrants to Canada; both were established to serve the small community of Norway, Ontario, then a considerable distance from the city of Toronto. The town itself was named after the Norway pine trees native to the area, and was amalgamated into Toronto in 1908.

The land for the cemetery was donated by landowner Charles Coxwell Small. Originally three acres, the cemetery now covers about 35. Over the decades there have been almost 80,000 interments, and over 50,000 gravestones now stand in the cemetery. While attached to an Anglican church, the cemetery is non-denominational.

The cemetery is perched on a large sandy hill which was once one of the large dunes formed by Glacial Lake Iroquois. The sand from this hill was used extensively by the Toronto brickworks, and is thus found in many of the city's older buildings.

== Notable interments ==
The cemetery was never a site for the burial of the city's elite, with Mount Pleasant Cemetery being the standard resting place for those of prominence. The vast majority of those buried there are representatives of the middle and working class of east end Toronto. There are some prominent figures buried at St. John's, such as R. C. Harris, Toronto director of public works who built the nearby R. C. Harris Water Treatment Plant, was interred there in 1945 and architect Frank Darling. Canadian athlete and sports journalist Ted Reeve as well as horsebreeder, William H. Bringloe and writer, Norah M. Holland.

The cemetery contains the war graves of 196 Commonwealth service personnel of both World Wars.

== Monuments ==
At the rear of the cemetery there is a cenotaph honouring veterans of D-Day.

== Cinema ==
The picturesque cemetery close to the studio district has also become a popular one for filming. The church has also turned to this to get much needed revenue to help maintain the site. Among the movies in which the cemetery appears are To Die For, Angel Eyes, Four Brothers, and Get Rich or Die Tryin'.
