= Dick Hegarty =

English footballer

Personal information
- Full name: Richard Hegarty
- Date of birth: 1884
- Place of birth: Stockton-on-Tees, England
- Date of death: 3 October 1917 (aged 33)
- Place of death: Gosforth, England
- Position: Right back

Senior career*
Years	Team	Apps	(Gls)
- Belle Vue Athletic
- West Hartlepool Perseverance
- West Hartlepool
1905	Stockport County	1	(0)
- Sunderland Royal Rovers
1908–1910	Hartlepools United	29	(1)
- North Shields Athletic
- West Hartlepool St Joseph's
- * Club domestic league appearances and goals

Richard Hegarty (1884 – 3 October 1917) was an English professional footballer who played as a right back in the Football League for Stockport County.

== Personal life ==
Hegarty served as a sergeant in the Royal Field Artillery during the First World War and died of "wounds and gas" at Northumberland War Hospital on 3 October 1917. He was buried in Stranton Grange Cemetery, Hartlepool. His elder brother Daniel died in service on 29 July 1919.

== Career statistics ==
Appearances and goals by club, season and competition
Club	Season	League			FA Cup		Total	
Club	Season	Division	Apps	Goals	Apps	Goals	Apps	Goals
Stockport County	1905–06	First Division	1	0	0	0	1	0
Hartlepools United	1908–09	North Eastern League	26	1	0	0	26	1
Hartlepools United	1909–10	North Eastern League	3	0	1	0	4	0
Hartlepools United	Total		29	1	1	0	30	1
Career total			30	1	1	0	31	1
