= Bob Rumball =

Canadian pastor and disability advocate

Profile
- Position: Halfback

Personal information
- Born: October 2, 1929; Toronto, Ontario
- Died: June 1, 2016 (aged 86); Parry Sound, Ontario
- Listed height: 5 ft 11 in (1.80 m)
- Listed weight: 185 lb (84 kg)

Career history
- 1952–1954: Ottawa Rough Riders
- 1955: Toronto Argonauts
- 1956: Ottawa Rough Riders

Robert Leslie Rumball OC OOnt (October 2, 1929 – June 1, 2016) was a pastor and advocate for the deaf and those with special needs.

After studying at University of Toronto, he began his career as a football player, playing at the varsity level before playing professionally for the Canadian Football League in the position of half-back for the Ottawa Rough Riders. After four seasons in Ottawa, he was traded to Toronto where he played one season for the Argonauts.

During this time, he attended Northern Baptist Seminary in Chicago in the off seasons, and preached on Sundays at various churches. He was introduced to Deaf culture while preaching at the Evangelical Church of the Deaf, located at the time in downtown Toronto, and began a lifetime of advocacy. He learned American Sign Language to communicate with Toronto's Deaf population, and give their needs a voice.

Realizing they needed a place of their own, Rumball purchased land in 1960 to establish the Ontario Camp of the Deaf in 1960, and opened the Ontario Community Centre for the Deaf (now called the Bob Rumball Centre for the Deaf) in 1979.

The Bob Rumball Canadian Centre of Excellence for the Deaf houses numerous programs and services, including the Evangelical Church of the Deaf, a preschool, a long-term care home, and the Ontario Association for the Deaf. The centre is managed by his son, Derek Rumball.

Rumball's work has been recognized with many honours, including the Order of Ontario, the Order of Canada, and appointment as a Citizenship Court Judge. Rumball died at the age of 86 in Parry Sound Ontario on June 1, 2016.
