= Heggarty =

Heggarty is a surname. Notable people with the surname include:

- Archie Heggarty (1884–1951), Irish footballer
- Jim Heggarty (born 1965), Northern Irish footballer

== See also ==
- Hegarty
