= Hegerty =

Hegerty is a surname. Notable people with the surname include:

- Anne Hegerty (born 1958), English television personality and quizzer
- Francis Hegerty (born 1982), Australian rower
- Nannette Hegerty, American police chief

== See also ==
- Hagerty
- Hegarty
