= James Haggerty =

James Haggerty may refer to:

- James Haggerty (Canadian politician) (1833–1912), farmer
- James Haggerty (New York politician) (1834–1887), Irish-American lawyer
- Jimmy Haggerty (died 1871), American gangster

== See also ==
- James Hagerty (1909–1981), press secretary for Dwight D. Eisenhower
- James Haggarty (1914–1998), Canadian ice hockey player
- Jim Haggerty, fictional host of The Onion web series Today Now!, Porkin' Across America, and The Jim Haggerty Show.
