= Evangelical Church of the Deaf =

- Evangelical Church of the Deaf
- 43°44′04.7″N 79°22′49.4″W
- Location: Toronto, Ontario
- Country: Canada
- Language: American Sign Language
- Denomination: United Church of Canada
- Website: torontoecd.org

The Evangelical Church of the Deaf is a congregation of the United Church of Canada for the deaf. It is located at the Bob Rumball Centre for the Deaf in Toronto, Ontario. Services, conducted entirely by signing, draw deaf worshipers who were reared in Catholic churches and in an array of Protestant denominations.

== History ==
From 1925 to 1973, the church used the historic Paul Kane House as its church hall. The former footballer Bob Rumball was appointed as the church's pastor in 1956, and became a noted advocate for the deaf community.

In about 1960 the church purchased property in the country and opened the Ontario Camp of the Deaf, using army surplus tents. The camp prospered; in 2000 it could serve 212 campers in a "sunny dining hall", and hosted 300 campers every summer.

The church meets at a dedicated multipurpose centre on Bayview Avenue. It was constructed in the late 1970s on a 6.1-acre property purchased from General Bruce Matthews and includes a sanctuary seating 300. The Toronto Maple Leafs founder Conn Smythe, the team owner Harold Ballard, and the wrestler Whipper Billy Watson helped Rumball to raise the $7.6 million to open the centre. Initially known as the Ontario Community Centre for the Deaf, it was renamed the Bob Rumball Canadian Centre of Excellence for the Deaf after Rumball's death in 2016.

In 2009, the Toronto Star reported, "The centre includes a 75-room residence for seniors and special needs adults, a daycare, a non-denominational church, a library, a skills-training facility, sign language classes for new Canadians, a host of community service programs and a welcoming space for social functions of all kinds."
