= Haggarty =

Haggarty is a surname. Notable people by that name include:

- Gary Haggarty (born c. 1973), leader of an Ulster Volunteer Force unit
- George Haggarty (1902–1971), American basketball and baseball player
- James Haggarty (1914–1998), Canadian ice hockey player
- Matt Haggarty, English rugby player

== See also ==
- Hagarty, surname
