= Hegarty =

Hegarty (Irish: Ó hÉigeartuigh) is an Irish surname. Notable people with the surname include:

- Anton Hegarty (1892–1944), British athlete who competed in cross country
- Antony Hegarty (born 1971), English singer-songwriter, lead singer of Antony and the Johnsons
- Bill Hegarty (1931–2002), former American football offensive tackle in the National Football League
- Brian Hegarty (born 1950), Scottish rugby union player
- Chris Hegarty (born 1984), Scottish professional footballer who plays as a midfielder
- Colin Hegarty, creator of HegartyMaths, an English educational website
- Dan Hegarty, Irish radio presenter employed by RTÉ
- Den Hegarty (born 1954), rock and roll, doo-wop and a cappella singer
- Diarmuid Hegarty (Griffith College), president of Griffith College Dublin
- Diarmuid O'Hegarty (1892–1958), Irish revolutionary and civil servant
- Dick Hegarty (1885–1917), English footballer
- Elliot Hegarty (born 1971), television director of American and British television
- Fergal Hegarty, retired Irish athlete
- Frances Hegarty or Frances Fyfield (born 1948), British lawyer and crime-writer
- Ger Hegarty (born 1966), retired Irish sportsperson
- Herbert George Hegarty, World War I flying ace credited with eight aerial victories
- Jack Hegarty (born 1888), American football player and coach of football and basketball
- Jimmy Hegarty (born 1940), Irish hurler
- John Hegarty (academic), elected 43rd Provost of Trinity College, Dublin, Ireland in 2001
- John Hegarty (politician) (born 1947), former Australian politician
- John Hegarty (rugby union) (1925–2016), Scottish rugby union player
- Mary Hegarty, Cork opera soprano
- Michael Hegarty, Irish Gaelic footballer
- Nick Hegarty (born 1986), English footballer who plays as a left-sided midfielder and wing back
- Owen Hegarty (born 1991), of Wetbrain Cheeks fame
- Pat Hegarty (born 1948), Irish retired sportsperson
- Patrick Hegarty (1926–2002), Irish Fine Gael politician and farmer
- Paul Hegarty (born 1954), Scottish former football player
- Paul Hegarty (Irish footballer) (born 1967), past Irish footballer, manager of League of Ireland First Division club Finn Harps
- Paul Hegarty (musician) (born 1967), musician, author, and university lecturer
- Ruth Hegarty (born 1929), Aboriginal Elder and author
- Séamus Hegarty (1940–2019), Irish Roman Catholic bishop
- Seán O'Hegarty (1881–1963), prominent member of the Irish Republican Army in Cork during the Irish War of Independence
- Sean Hegarty, Gaelic footballer from County Kerry
- Shannon Hegarty (born 1979), Australian former rugby league footballer
- Timothy John Hegarty (born 1965), Northern Irish songwriter
- Valerie Hegarty (born 1967), American artist

== See also ==
- Bartle Bogle Hegarty, British advertising agency
- Hagarty
- Hegardt
- Hegerty
