= John Hawkins Hagarty =

Canadian judge

The Honourable Sir John Hawkins Hagarty
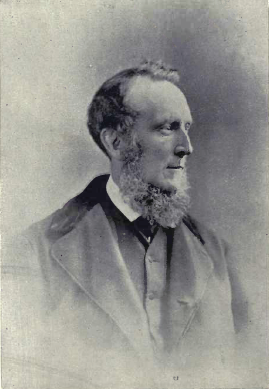

Chief Justice of Ontario
- In office 1884–1897
- Preceded by: John Godfrey Spragge
- Succeeded by: Sir George William Burton

Personal details
- Born: 17 September 1816 Dublin, Ireland
- Died: 27 April 1900 (aged 83) Toronto, Ontario, Canada
- Relatives: Norah M. Holland (grand-niece)
- Education: Trinity College, Dublin

Sir John Hawkins Hagarty (17 September 1816 – 27 April 1900) was a Canadian lawyer, teacher, and judge.

Born in Dublin, Ireland, Hagarty was educated at Trinity College Dublin for a year before emigrating to Upper Canada in 1834. He was a student-at-law in the law office of George Duggan in Toronto. He was called to the Bar in 1840 and was a partner with John Willoughby Crawford. As well from 1852 to 1855, he taught at Trinity College, Toronto.

In 1856, he was appointed a judge. He was a judge for 41 years including: Puisne Judge of the Court of Common Pleas (1856–62), judge of the Court of Queen's Bench (1862–68), Chief Justice of Common Pleas (1868–78), Chief Justice of Queen's Bench (1878–84), and President of the Court of Appeal and Chief Justice of Ontario (1884–97).

He was knighted in the 1897 Diamond Jubilee Honours when he retired in 1897.
