= La Belle Castelle =

Sculpture by Rémi Le Forestier

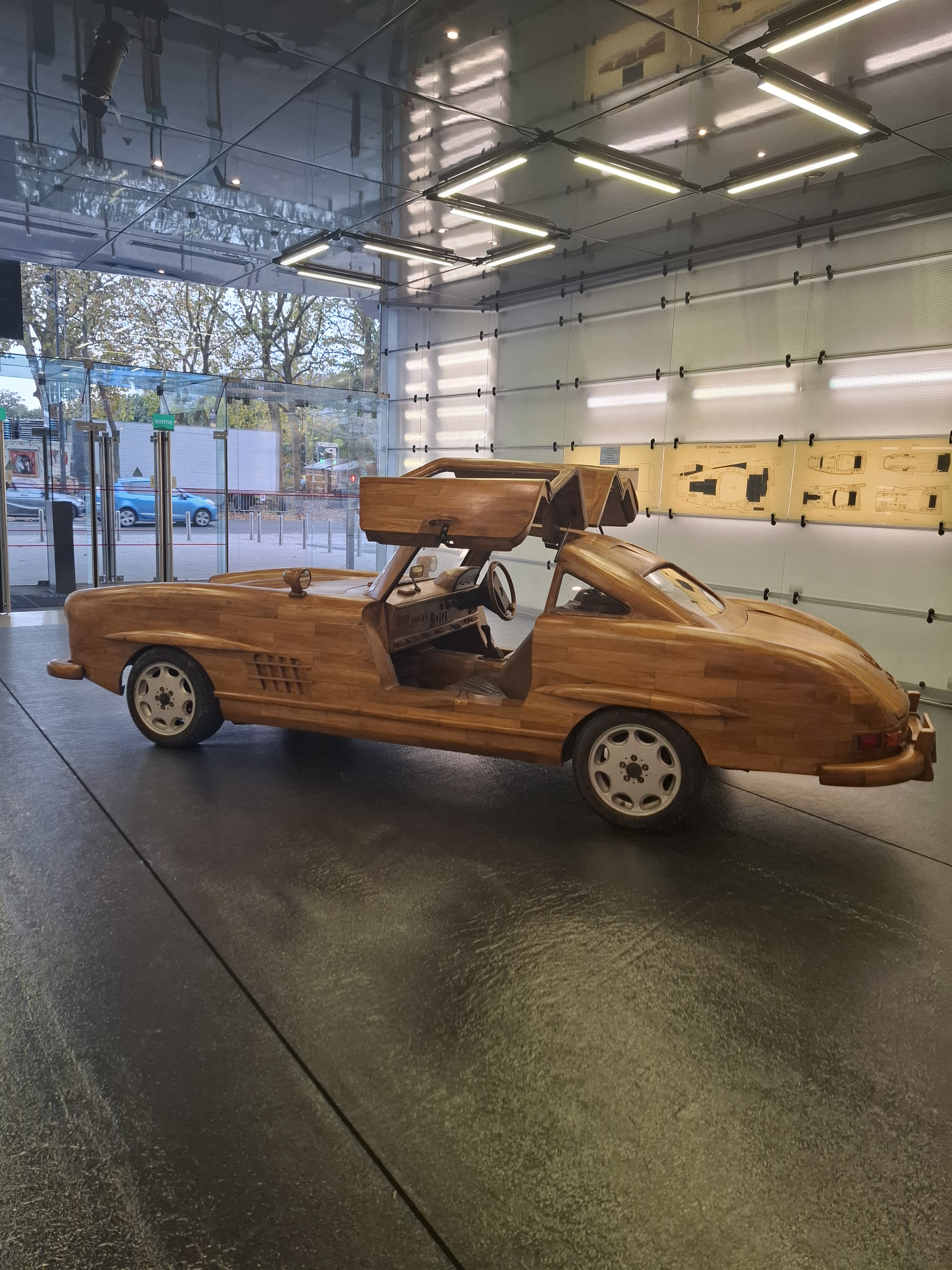

La Belle Castelle is a work of art crafted from solid teak and hand-carved by French artist Rémi Le Forestier. It is a life-size wooden replica of a Mercedes-Benz 300 SL with gullwing doors, powered by a six-cylinder petrol engine that enables it to drive.

== Origins ==
This work was created for the exhibition Alain Delon: The Lives of a Free Man, held at the Château de Monthyon in France, a former castle of the French actor Jean-Claude Brialy,. Alain Delon owned a Mercedes-Benz 300 SL in the 1950s, and the exhibition organizers commissioned artist Rémi Le Forestier to recreate the car in wood,.

Rémi Le Forestier was inspired by the Hispano-Suiza Tulipwood, a 1924 car owned by French racing driver André Dubonnet, featuring a mahogany body.

The wooden Mercedes 300 SL at Château de Sancy-lès-Meaux

Viewed more than 7 million times on social media, the car gained widespread exposure through coverage by prominent influencers, including Australian YouTuber Alexandra Mary Hirschi.

== Creation ==
La Belle Castelle combines fine woodworking with mechanical engineering. It required 8,000 hours of work by the workshops of Rémi Le Forestier.

To create it, the artist dismantled the bodywork of a 1989 Mercedes E300, retaining the chassis, engine and certain mechanical components, which required modifications and adaptations. He built a tubular steel frame and passenger compartment onto the chassis, then fitted a solid teak body, hand-carved and sanded. Teak was chosen for its resistance to the elements. Most of the components were recreated, including the headlights, turn signals and leather upholstery,.

La Belle Castelle in Paris

Powered by a six-cylinder Mercedes petrol engine, it can reach speeds of up to 80 km/h (50 mph) despite weighing 2.5 tonnes,.

Its name pays tribute to the town of Château-Thierry in France, where artist Rémi Le Forestier has established his workshops. Completed in April 2025, it was blessed by Dom Arnaud, the parish priest of Château-Thierry.
