= Rémi Le Forestier =

French artist and interior designer

- Born: July 3, 1985 (age 41); Paris, France
- Notable work: replica of the throne of Jean-Bédel Bokassa; La Belle Castelle; Trump Desk

Rémi Le Forestier (born July 3, 1985, in Paris) is a French artist and interior designer.

== Early life ==
Born on July 3, 1985, in Paris, Rémi Le Forestier grew up in Senlis in France before studying business in Lille and in Germany. He lives abroad for a while before moving to Paris.

== Career ==
Based in Château-Thierry since 2019, he was elected to the municipal council in 2026, serving on the Culture Committee.

As a manufacturer of period-style furniture for professionals in the luxury hospitality industry and the events sector, Rémi Le Forestier has had the opportunity to collaborate with renowned interior designers such as Jacques Garcia. Recognizing the potential to transform his furniture into unique works of art, he specializes in reproducing historical furniture for cinema. Some of his creations are exhibited in museums and prestigious venues, including the Musée Grévin, for which he notably created the desk used to depict Emmanuel Macron.

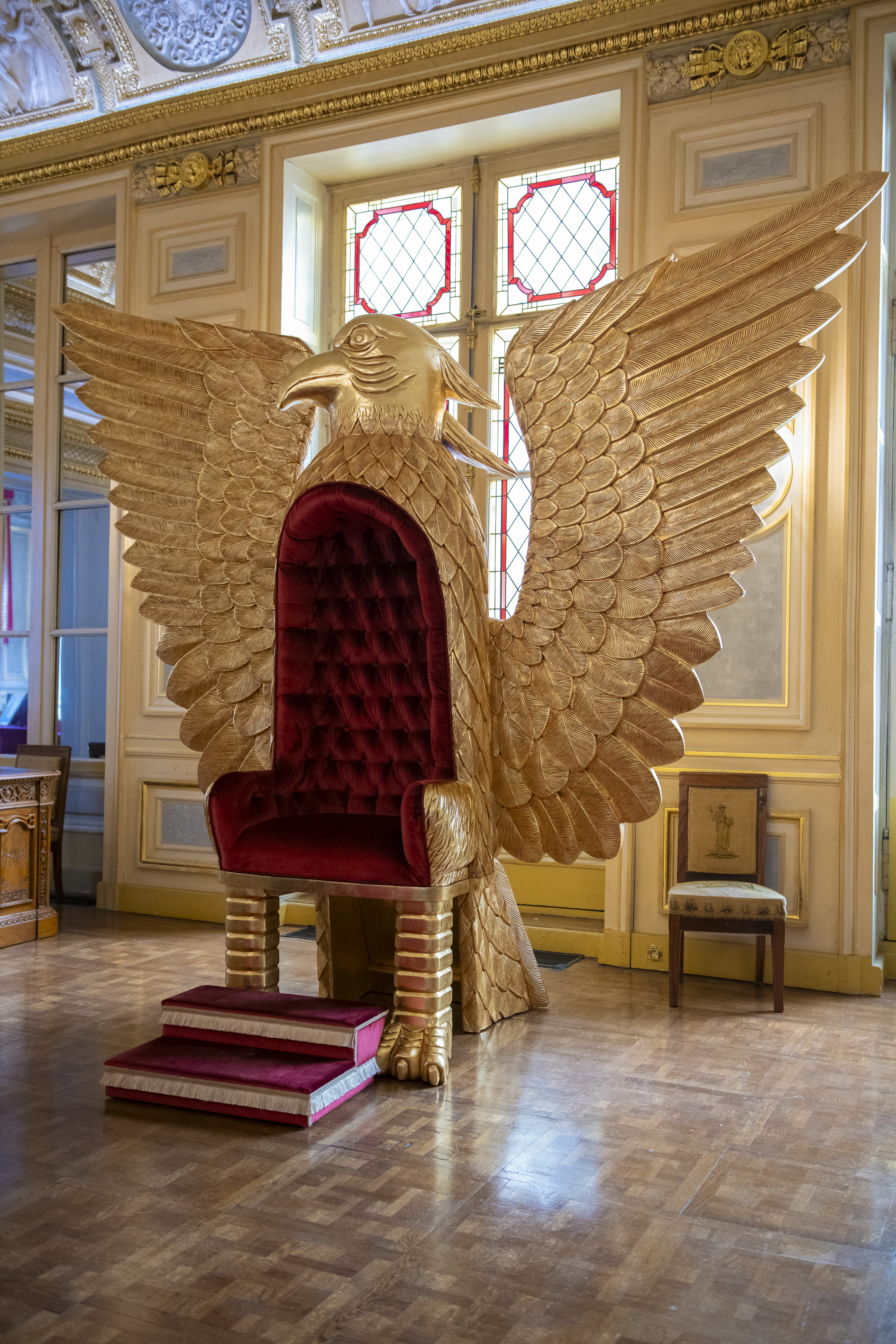
Bokassa's Throne at the Palais Vivienne

In 2023, at the request of Jean-Barthélémy Bokassa, he created the only full-size replica of the throne of Central African Emperor Jean-Bédel Bokassa, as part of an exhibition held at the Palais Vivienne in Paris, the residence of the French collector Pierre-Jean Chalençon.

The original throne, designed in gilded bronze by sculptor Olivier Brice, had cost $2,500,000. Following the fall of the emperor in 1979, the population looted the original throne to melt down its bronze components. Only the skeletal framework of Bokassa's throne remains in Bangui. The monumental full-size replica, measuring 3 metres high and 3.5 metres wide, required 2,000 hours of work and was gilded with gold leaf.

Advanced discussions have been initiated with the Ministry of Arts, Culture and Tourism, as well as former Central African minister Jean-Serge Bokassa, with the aim of exhibiting this work at the Barthélemy Boganda National Museum in Bangui. The throne was eventually put up for auction at the Château d’Artigny.

This unusual and controversial sale attracted considerable attention in the Central African Republic, where some wrongly accused France of attempting to sell the original throne, allegedly stolen in 1979 during Operation Barracuda, following rumours spread by the Wagner paramilitary group. However, only the remains of the original throne still exist in Bangui. Unlike the original, which was made of gilded bronze, the visually faithful replica was crafted from solid mahogany. The sale received extensive media coverage in France, notably prompting Paris Match to revisit its famous December 1977 cover featuring Bokassa's coronation, which had helped raise the magazine's international profile despite the controversy.

Letter of Donald Trump

In 2024, he created the Trump Desk, a desk entirely hand-carved for Donald Trump, with the support of American billionaire Zaya S. Younan. At the request of Tham Kannalikham, the interior designer for Melania Trump, he shipped the desk to Mar-a-Lago, the personal residence of the President of the United States.

Donald Trump personally thanked him in a letter, emphasizing the symbolic significance of the gesture in strengthening Franco-American.

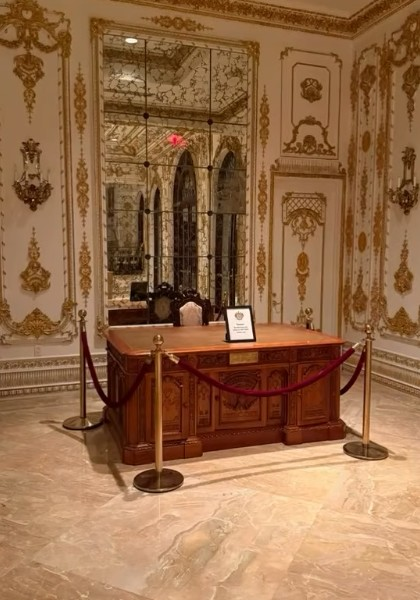
Trump Desk installed at Mar-a-Lago

The desk is a replica of the Resolute Desk, the famous historic desk used by American presidents since 1880 and located in the Oval Office of the White House. The artist customized the piece by adding Donald Trump's coat of arms and incorporating oak wood from Belleau Wood as a tribute to the U.S. Marines who sacrificed their lives during the Battle of Belleau Wood in 1918.

Photos of the Trump Desk installed in the ballroom lobby at Mar-a-Lago circulated on social media in 2025, gaining widespread traction among conspiracy theory circles. A controversy erupted, with many Americans falsely accusing Donald Trump of having taken the original Resolute Desk from the White House and moved it to his private residence. The controversy grew to such proportions that American media outlets were compelled to investigate and debunk the false rumour.

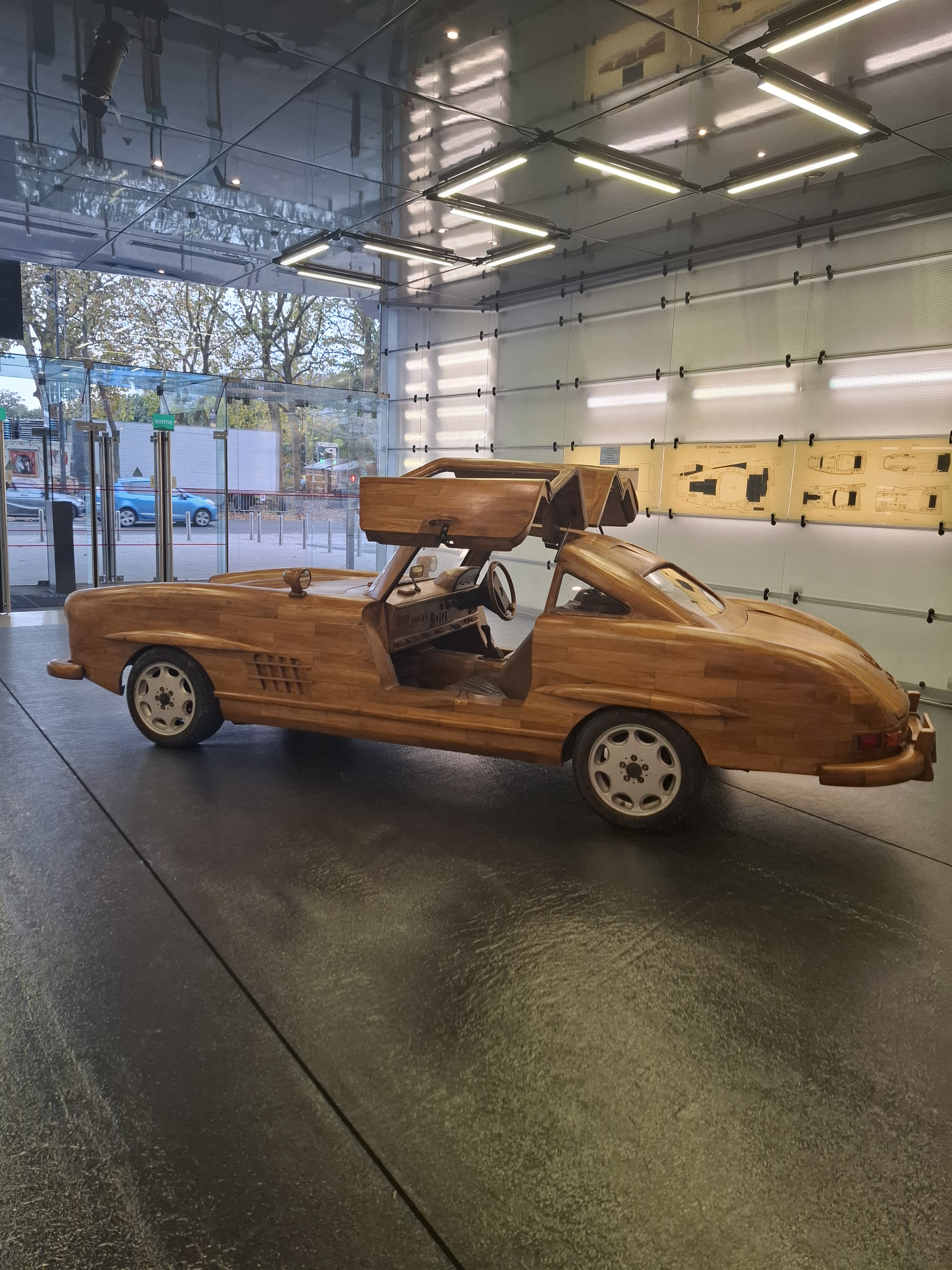
Mercedes 300 SL from wood

In 2025, he created La Belle Castelle, the world's only fully functional wooden Mercedes-Benz 300 SL, for an exhibition at the Château de Monthyon held in tribute to actor Alain Delon, who owned a car of this iconic model in the 1950s. The creation of this work of art required 8,000 hours of craftsmanship, and received international press acclaim for its originality and uniqueness. Viewed more than 7 million times on social media, the car attracted significant attention, notably thanks to coverage by prominent influencers such as Australian YouTuber Supercar Blondie. To mark the 250th anniversary of Franco-American friendship, he was commissioned by U.S. Ambassador Charles Kushner to create a gift from the United States to entrepreneur Bernard Arnault: a crystal plaque mounted on a base made from oak wood sourced from Belleau Wood.

== Art exhibitions ==
- 2023 : Forbidden Throne at Château des Princes de Condé
- 2023 : Thrones and Power at Château-Thierry
- 2023 : Thrones in Majesty at Palais Vivienne in Paris
- 2024 : Thrones from Louis XIV to Napoléon III at Château du Champ de Bataille
- 2024 : Garden Party of Château d'Artigny
- 2025 : Thrones and Royalty at Château d'Ussé
- 2025 : La Belle Castelle at Château de Fère and at Château de Montataire
- 2025 : Alain Delon, The Lives of a Free man au Château of Monthyon
- 2025 : Art in Everyday Life at Tours Convention Centre
