= Mercedes-Benz 300 SL =

Mercedes gullwinged coupé/roadster (1954–1963)

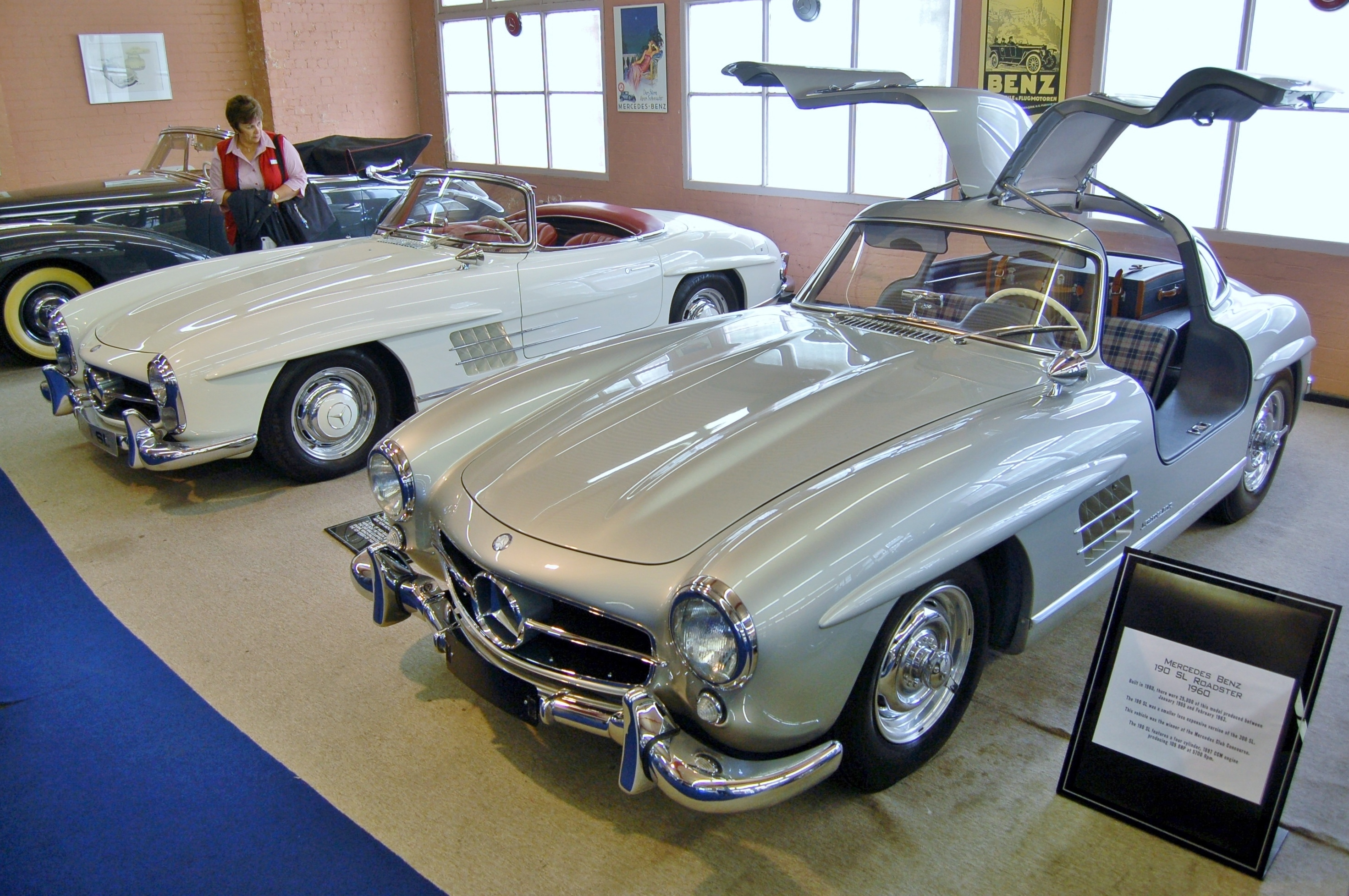
- 300 SL roadster and gullwinged coupé

Overview
- Manufacturer: Mercedes-Benz
- Production: 1954–1957 (Coupé): 1,400; 1957–1963 (Roadster): 1,858; 1955 (300 SLR Uhlenhaut Coupé): 2; 3,258 built
- Assembly: West Germany: Stuttgart-Untertürkheim
- Designer: Friedrich Geiger

Body and chassis
- Class: Sports car; Grand tourer
- Body style: 2-door coupé, roadster
- Layout: FR layout
- Platform: Coupé W198 I, Roadster W198 II
- Doors: Gull-wing (Coupe); Conventional (Roadster)
- Related: Mercedes-Benz W121 BII (190 SL)

Powertrain
- Engine: 2,996 cc (182.8 cu in) M198 straight-six engine
- Transmission: 4-speed manual

Dimensions
- Wheelbase: 2,400 mm (94.5 in)
- Length: 4,520 mm (178.0 in)
- Width: 1,790 mm (70.5 in)
- Height: 1,300 mm (51.2 in)
- Curb weight: Coupé 1,295 kilograms (2,855 pounds), Roadster 1,330 kilograms (2,930 pounds), from 1961 1,370 kilograms (3,020 pounds)

Chronology
- Predecessor: Mercedes-Benz W194 (racing car)
- Successor: Mercedes-Benz W113 (230SL); Mercedes-Benz SLS AMG

The Mercedes-Benz 300 SL (chassis code W 198) is a two-seat sports car that was produced by Mercedes-Benz from 1954 to 1957 as a gullwinged coupé and from 1957 to 1963 as a roadster. The road going 1954 fuel injected 300 SL (W198) traces its origins to the company's original 1952 300 SL carburetted racing car, the Mercedes-Benz W194. As one of the first automobiles to be equipped with a mechanical direct gasoline fuel-injection system, the power output of its three-liter overhead camshaft slanted straight-six engine surpassed that of its successful racing predecessor.

Depending on configuration of axle ratio, camshaft, bumpers etc., the 300 SL was capable of reaching 260 km/h (162 mph), earning it a reputation as a sports car racing champion, and making it the fastest production car of its time. The car's iconic gullwing doors and innovative lightweight tubular-frame construction were groundbreaking.

The designation "300 SL" is derived from the 1951 two-door luxury sports tourer Mercedes-Benz W188 "300 S", with the use of the S being not defined. The additional L, as 20 years earlier in the SSKL, is an abbreviation of the German term leicht, meaning "light", a reference to the car's racing-bred lightweight construction. Even in modern times it is disputed whether SL stood for Super Leicht or Sport Leicht.

Following the 1952 successes, like winning the 24h of Le Mans and the Carrera Panamericana, Max Hoffman, importer of Mercedes-Benz and other European brands to the United States at the time, recognized the potential demand for a high-performance sports car among American buyers. Due to his suggestion, an improved 300 SL was introduced to the American market in 1954/55. The Mercedes-Benz 300 SL remains a highly sought-after classic car and is celebrated for its performance, design, and technological advancements.

== Development ==
=== Origin in the W194 racing car ===
The 300 SL traces its origin to an endurance racer, the Mercedes-Benz W194, developed by Daimler-Benz in 1951. It used the 3-liter inline-6 M186 engine, shared by the company flagship 300 "Adenauer" saloon (W186) and the two-seat 300 S grand tourer (W188).

Although W194's 175 hp (130 kW) engine produced less power than competing cars by Ferrari and Jaguar, its low weight and low aerodynamic drag made the W194 fast enough to be competitive in endurance races.

Mercedes-Benz developed a new version for the 1953 racing season by replacing the M186's carburetors with mechanical direct fuel-injection, and shifting to 16-inch wheels; the gearbox was installed on its rear axle. Its body was made of Elektron, a magnesium alloy, which reduced its weight by 85 kilograms (187 pounds). Mercedes-Benz decided not to race this alloy car, choosing instead to begin participating in Formula One in 1954. Later versions revised the body to lower air resistance, and did not continue the transmission arrangement.

=== Origin of the 300 SL ===
The idea of Mercedes producing a toned-down Grand Prix car targeted to affluent performance enthusiasts in the booming post-war American market was suggested by the company's U.S. importer, Max Hoffman, at a 1953 directors' meeting in Stuttgart. Mercedes' new general director, Fritz Konecke, agreed to Hoffman's order for 1,000 cars to guarantee the success of the production run; the 300 SL was introduced at the February 1954 New York International Auto Show instead of the Frankfurt or Geneva shows, where company models usually debuted. In addition, the production of a smaller roadster, the Mercedes-Benz 190 SL, was announced after Hoffman placed an initial order for 1,000 to support their production. Mercedes received a positive visitor response to both cars in New York, and production began at the Sindelfingen plant in August of that year.

=== Cost ===
The price for the 300 SL coupé in Germany was DM 29,000, and $6,820 in the US. The roadster was DM 32,500 in Germany, and $10,950 in the US – 10 percent more expensive than the coupé in Europe, and over 70 percent more in the US.

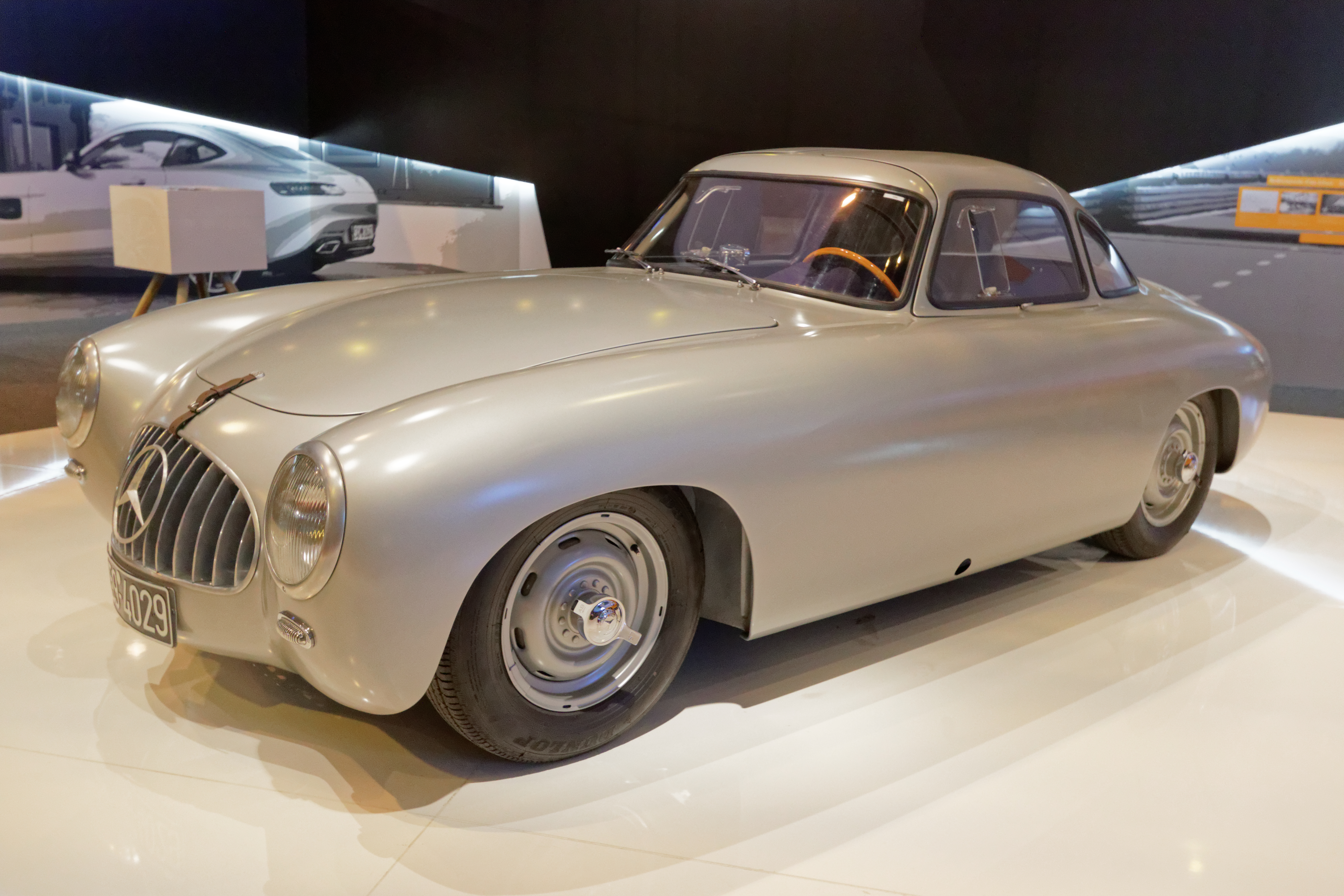
Prototype for the early 1952 Mercedes-Benz W194 racing cars, still with small "gullwing windows"

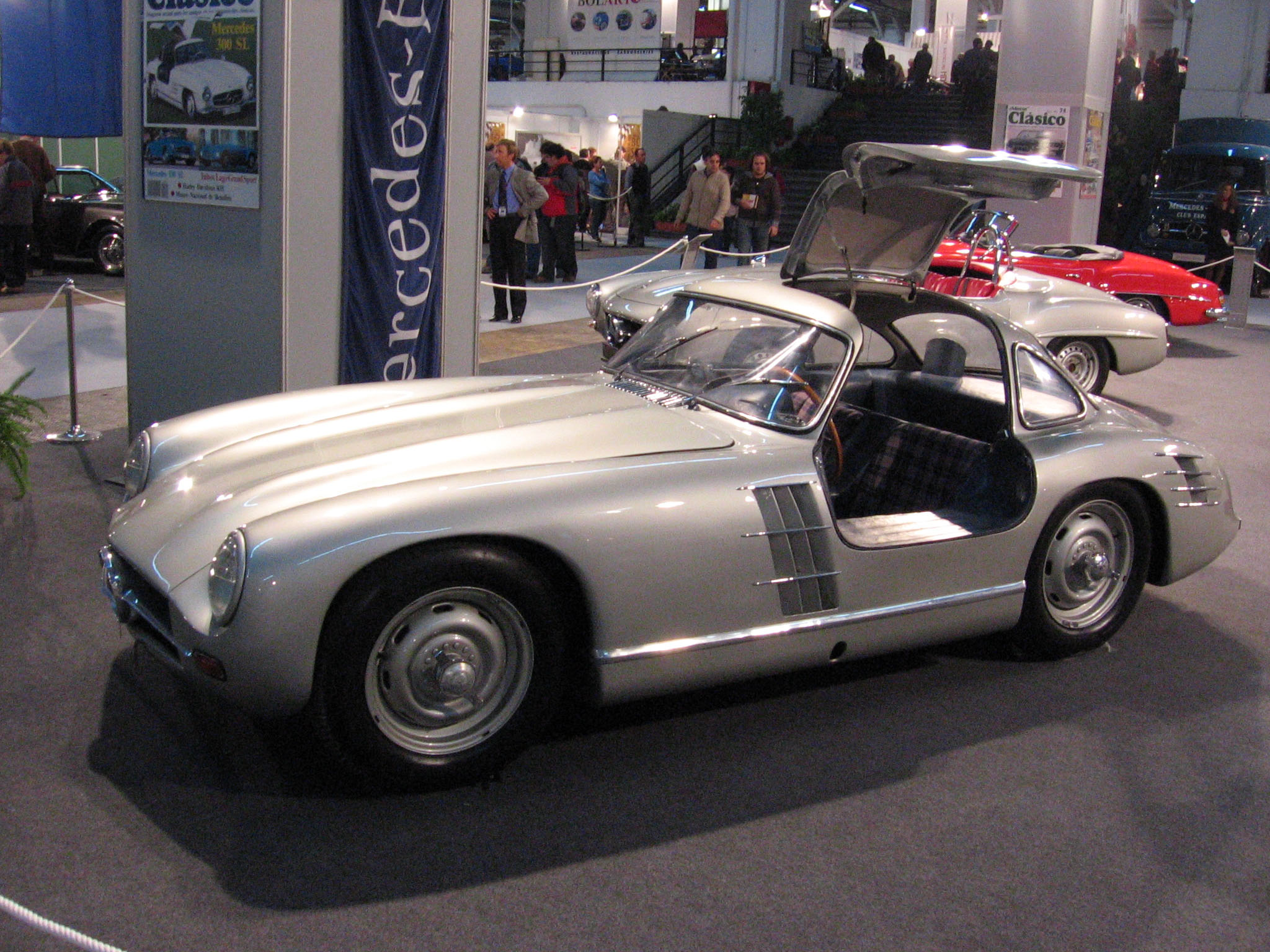
1953 300 SL prototype for the 1954 W198 road car, with large doors and vents

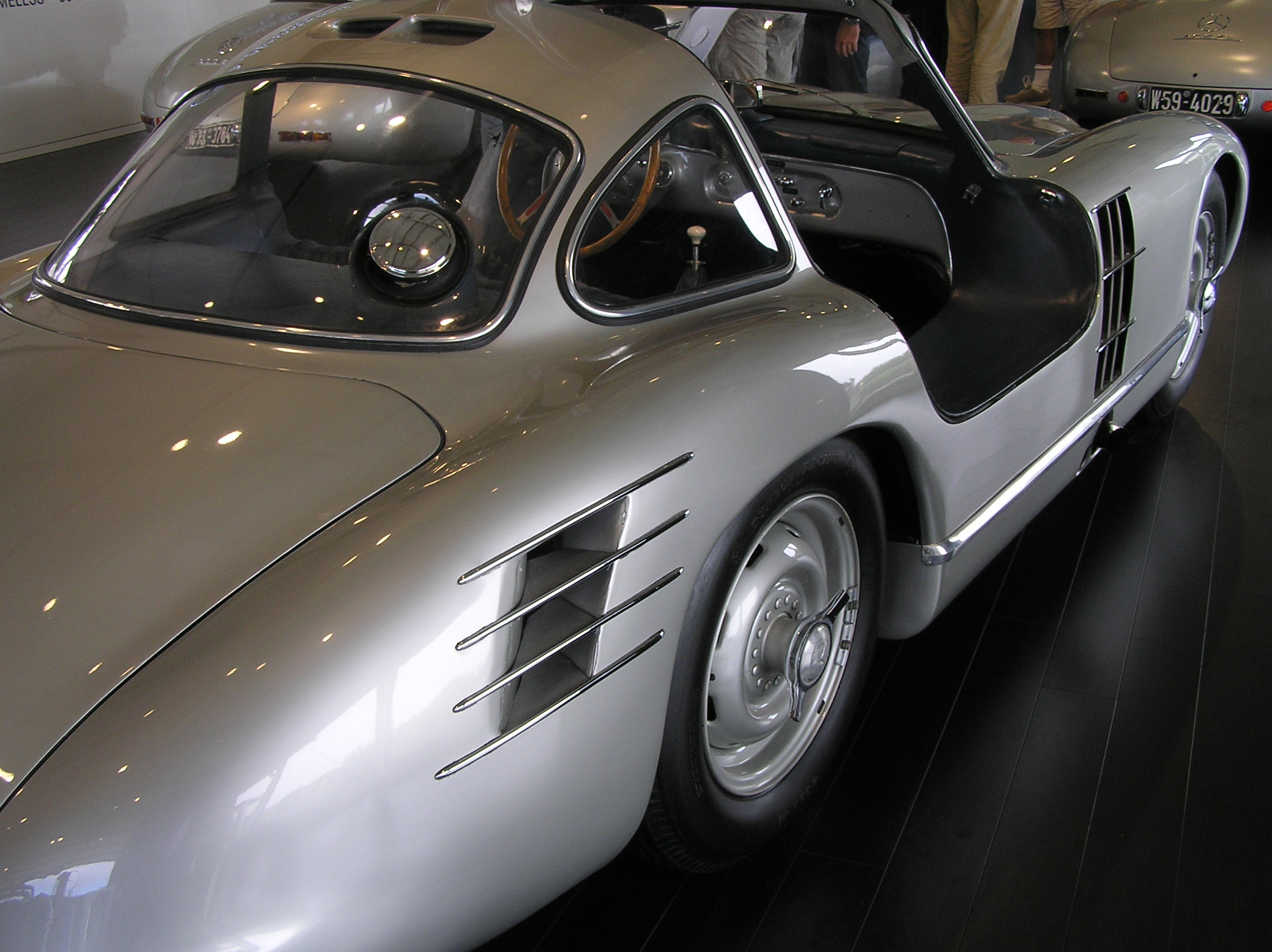
1953 prototype at Pebble Beach in 2012

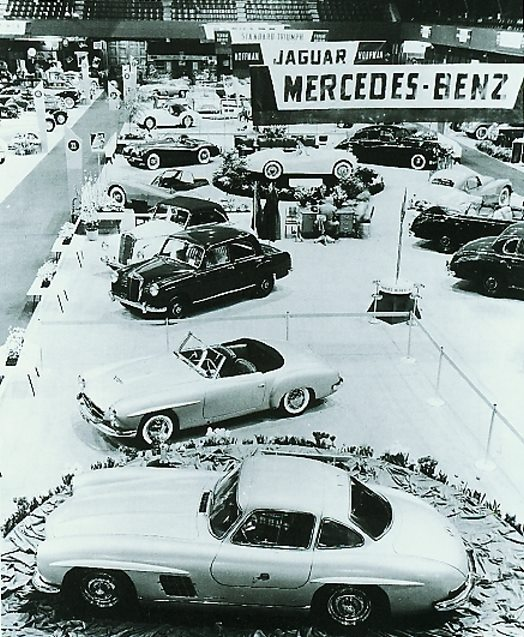
U.S. debut of the W198 at the New York Auto Show, 1954, next to a 190SL

Option	Price (USD)
Color (other than metallic silver)	65
Bumper guards (4)	40
Windscreen washers	18
Becker radio	264
Leather upholstery (coupé)	165
Fitted luggage (roadster)	85
Crated shipment from factory	80
Competition springs (4)	88
Competition front shock absorbers (2)	41
Competition rear shock absorbers (2)	85
Competition camshaft	73
Rudge wheels (5)	350
Optional ring and pinion gears, per set	80
Hardtop for roadster	178

=== SL abbreviation ===
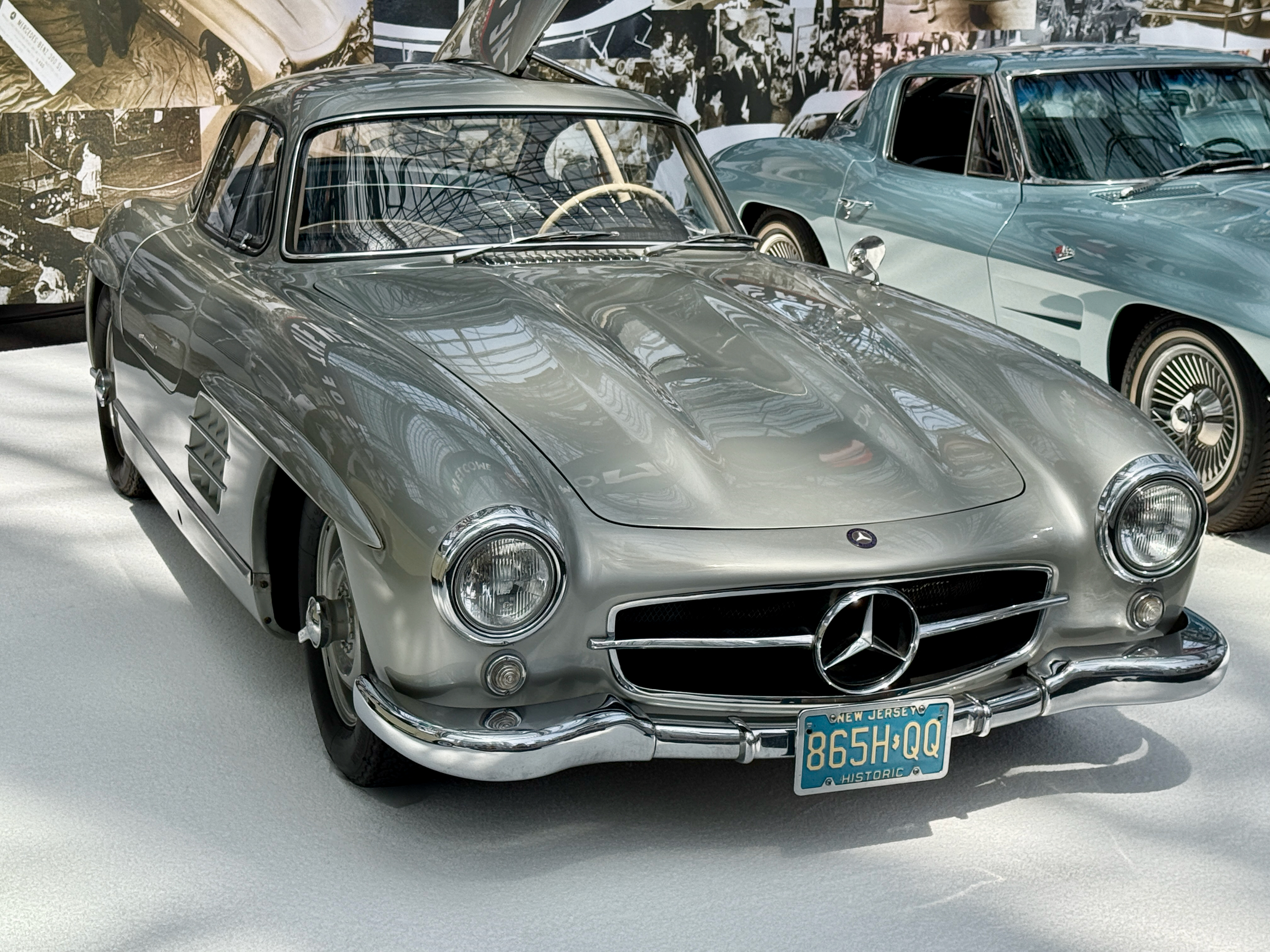
1955 Mercedes-Benz 300SL Gullwing

Mercedes-Benz did not announce what the abbreviation "SL" meant when the car was introduced; magazines and company officials have called it "Sport Leicht" and "Super Leicht" ("light"). It was called "Sport Leicht" on the company website until 2017, when "SL" was changed to "Super Leicht" after a chance finding in the corporate archives.

==== 300 SLS ====
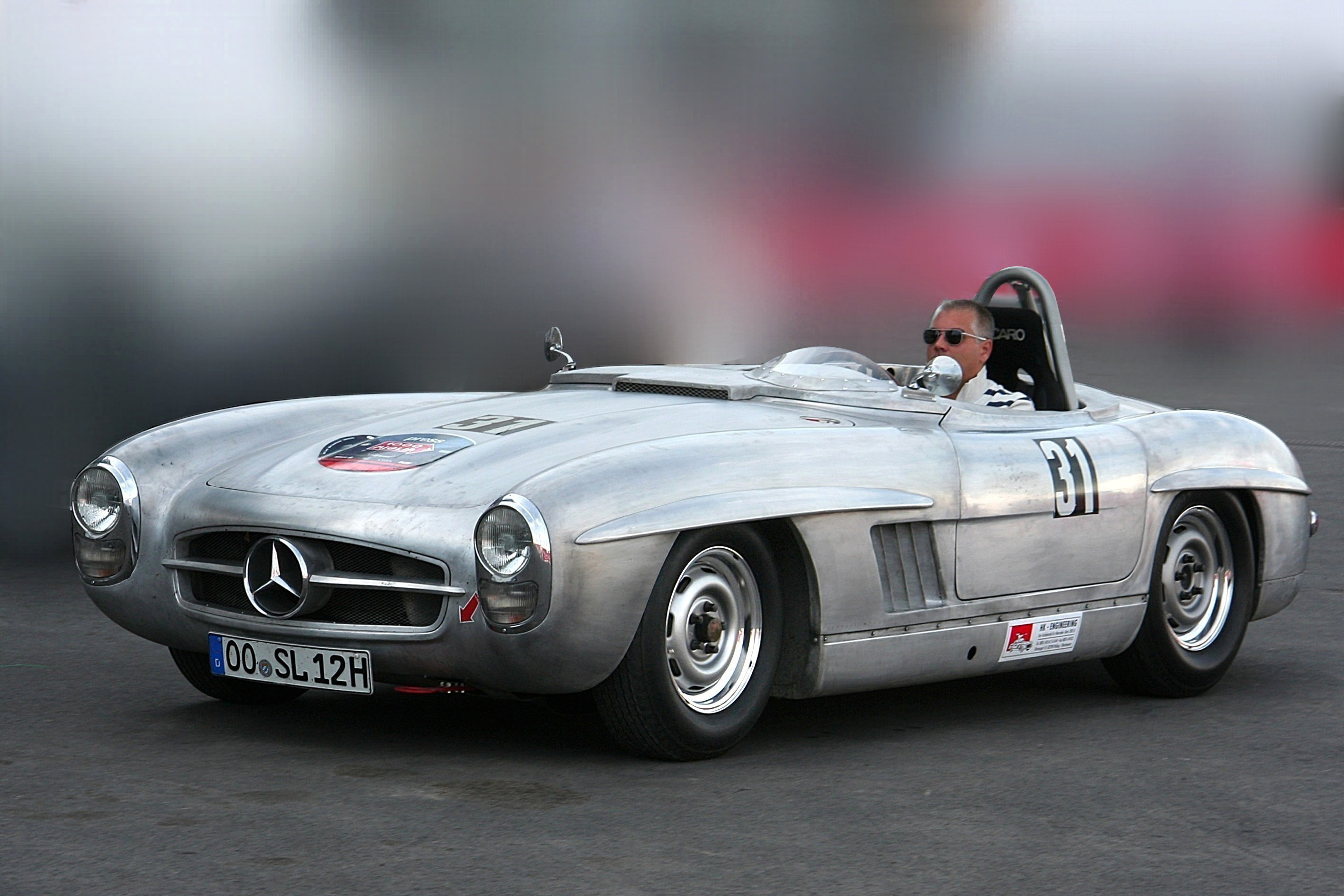
The 1957 Sports Car Club of America championship-winning 300 SLS was a 300 SL roadster modified to meet its racing standards.

A special 300 SLS (Super Light Special) version of the 300 SL roadster was created for the Mercedes-Benz US racing team to compete on the Sports Car Club of America (SCCA) national circuit in 1957. After the 300 SL coupé dominated the D Production class en route to titles in 1955 and 1956, the rules were changed to make the class more competitive by enlarging the maximum engine size from 3 to 3.5 liters. Rather than radically modifying its engine size (on the cusp of releasing the company's new 300 SL roadster, replacing the coupé), Mercedes-Benz created two roadsters to campaign on the D Modified class SCAA circuit. They featured a solid cover over the passenger seat, a low-profile racing screen in place of a full-width and -height windscreen, a driver's seat roll bar, a custom cowl with engine air intake, and no front and rear bumpers. These and other modifications lowered vehicle weight from 1,420 kilograms (3,130 pounds) to 1,040 kilograms (2,290 pounds). Engine output was increased 20 hp (15 kW), to 235 hp (175 kW). Team driver Paul O'Shea again won the title for the company.

== Overview ==
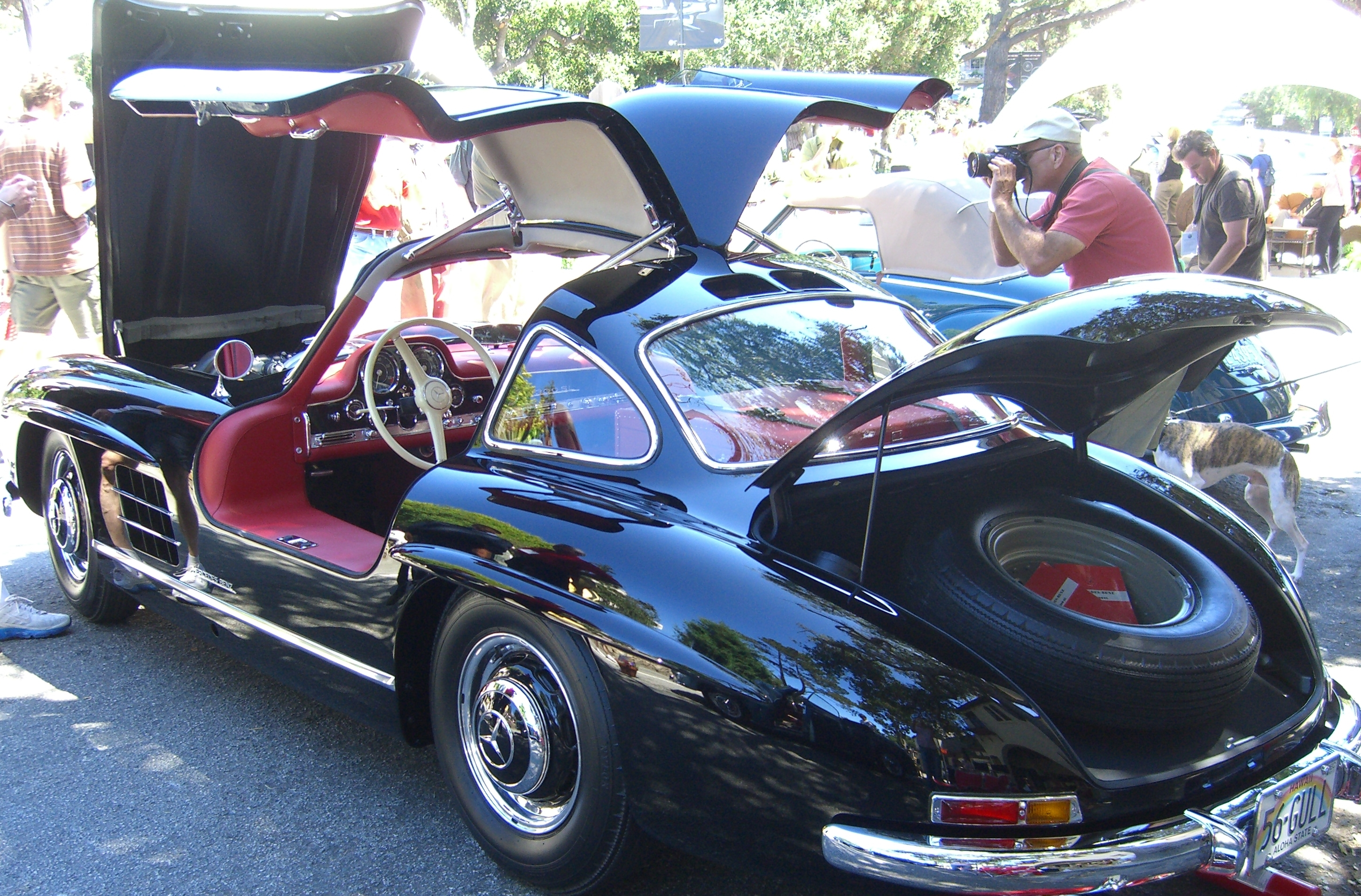
The coupé’s unusually high and wide door threshold led to the adaptation of its signature gullwing doors.

The 300 SL has a steel tubular frame chassis, with a steel body combined with an aluminum bonnet, doors, dashboard, and boot lid to further reduce weight. An additional 80 kilograms (176 pounds) could be eliminated with an expensive all-aluminum body, but only 29 were made. Depending on the rear axle ratio, fuel consumption was 17 liters per 100 km (14 miles per US gallon; 17 miles per imperial gallon).

=== Interior ===
Three checkered-pattern seat fabrics were standard: grey and green, grey and blue, and cream and red. Most customers opted for leather upholstery, which became standard on the roadster. With upward-opening doors, the coupé has an unusually-high sill; entering and exiting the car is problematic. The steering wheel pivots on its hub 90 degrees away from the dashboard to facilitate entry. Storage space for luggage is behind the seats in the coupé; the boot only holds a spare wheel and fuel tank. The roadster was available with two custom-fitted leather suitcases for the larger boot. The coupé's windows are fixed and roll down in the roadster.

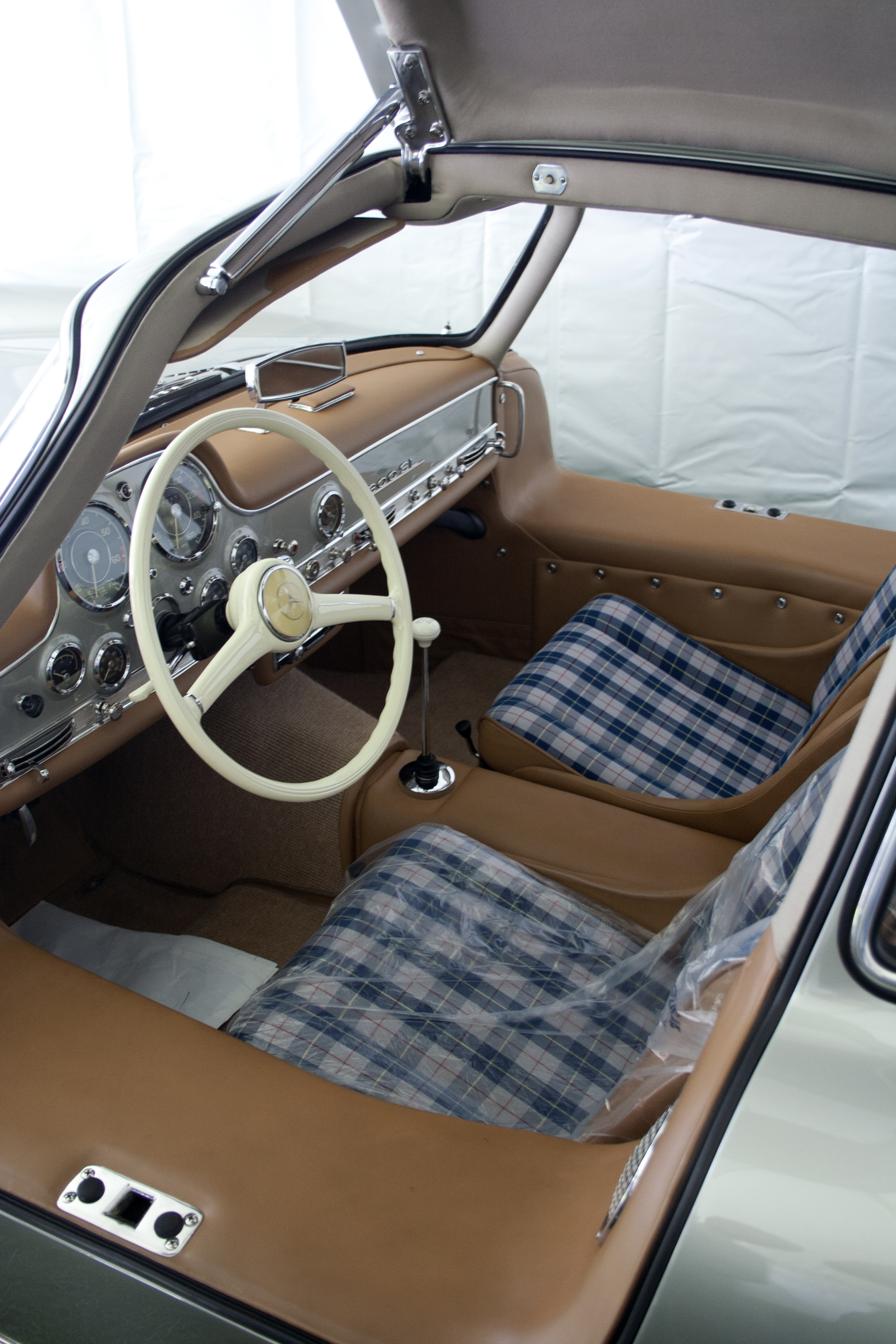
Fabric seats were standard in the coupé in a distinctive plaid pattern.

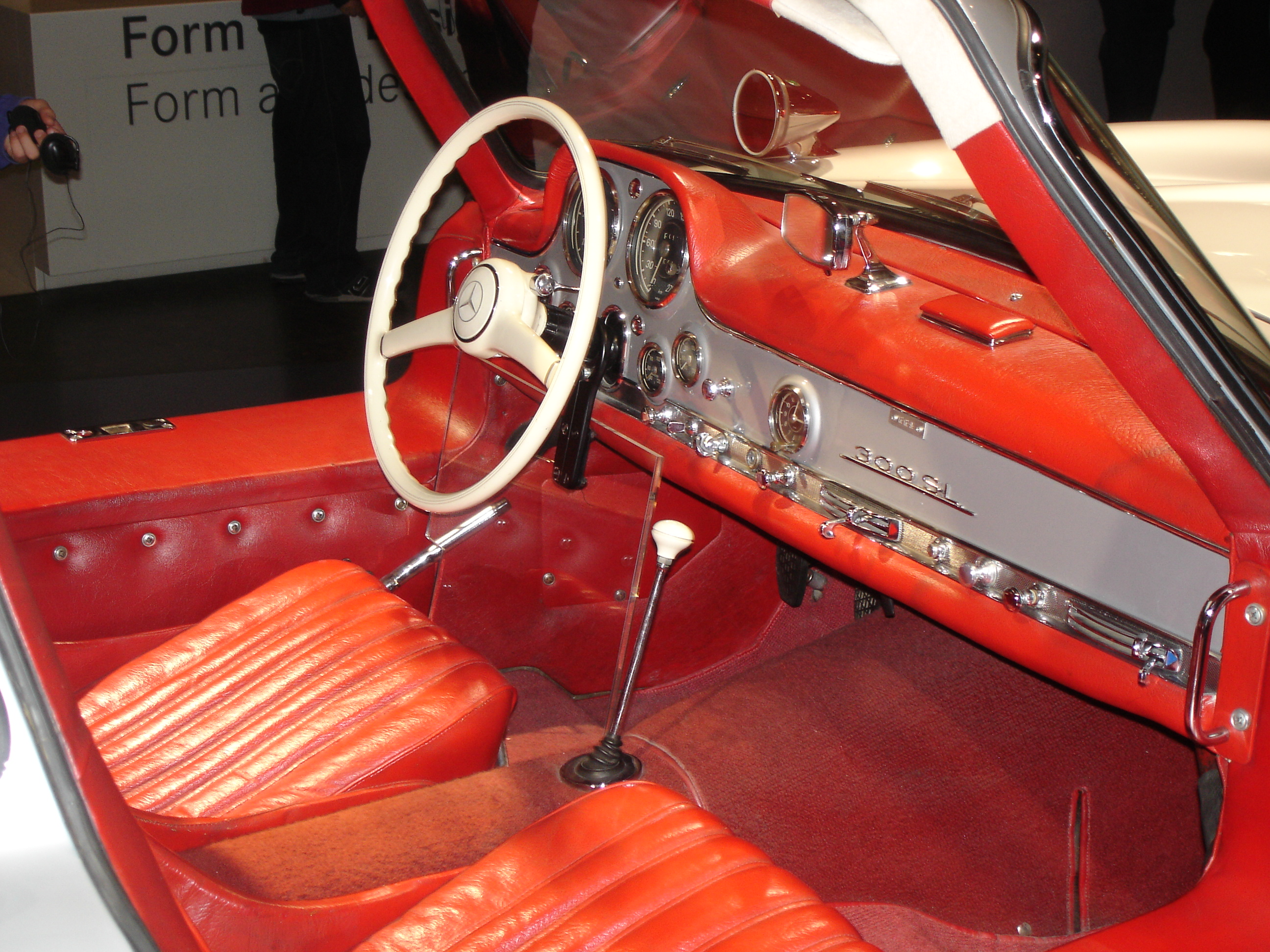
Leather seats were optional.

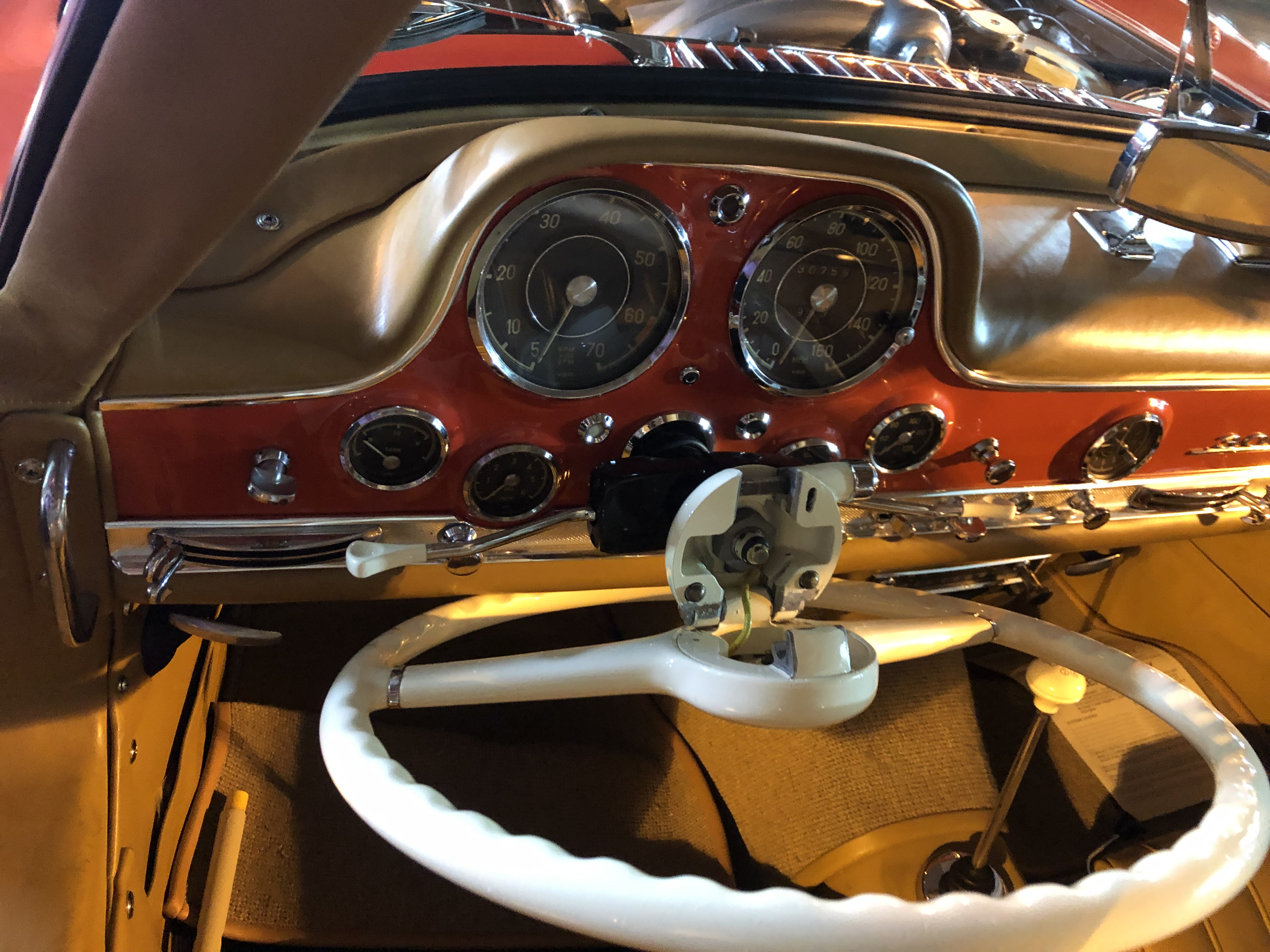
The steering wheel could be released to aid entry and exit.

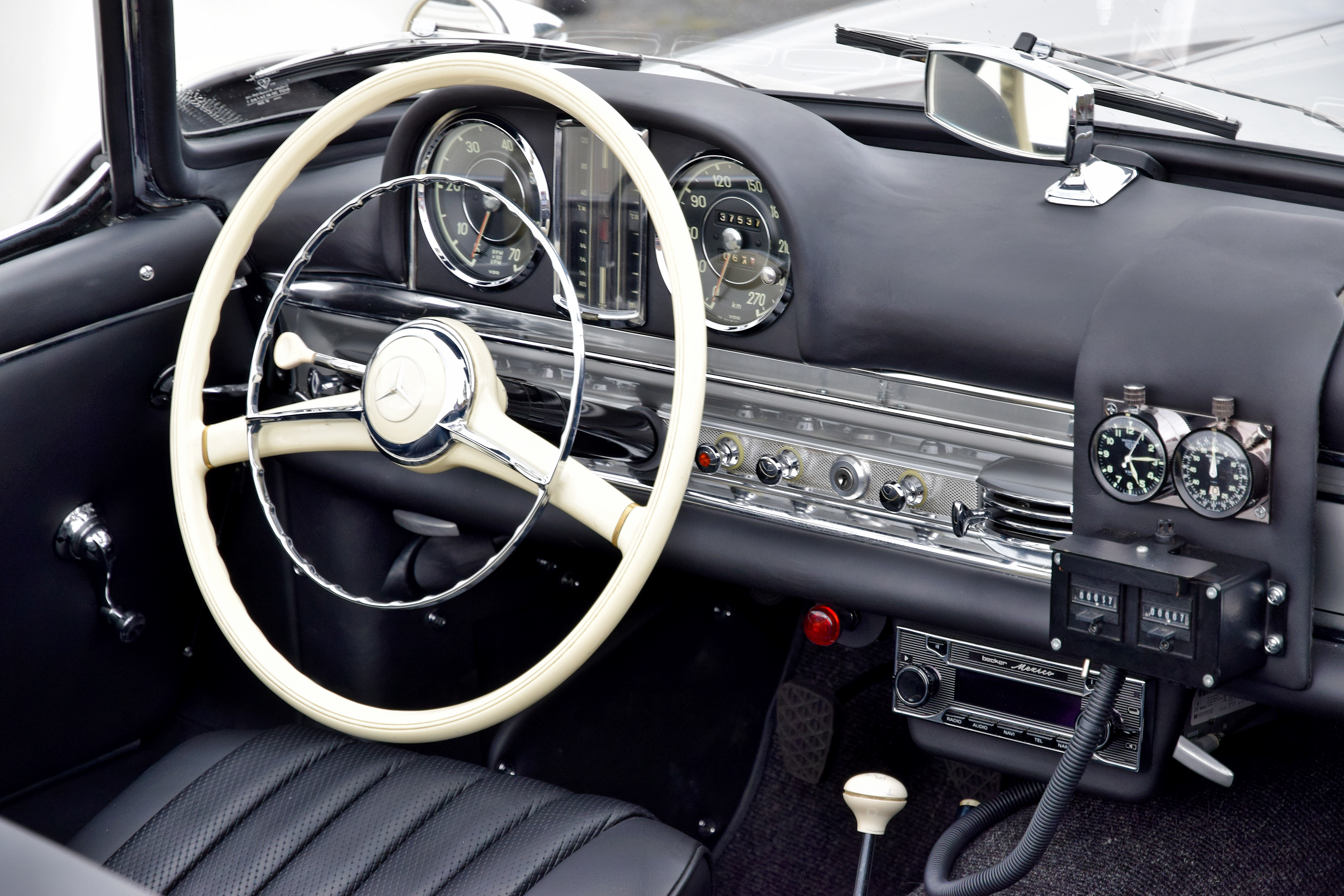
Roadster dashboard, with aftermarket gauge pod on the right

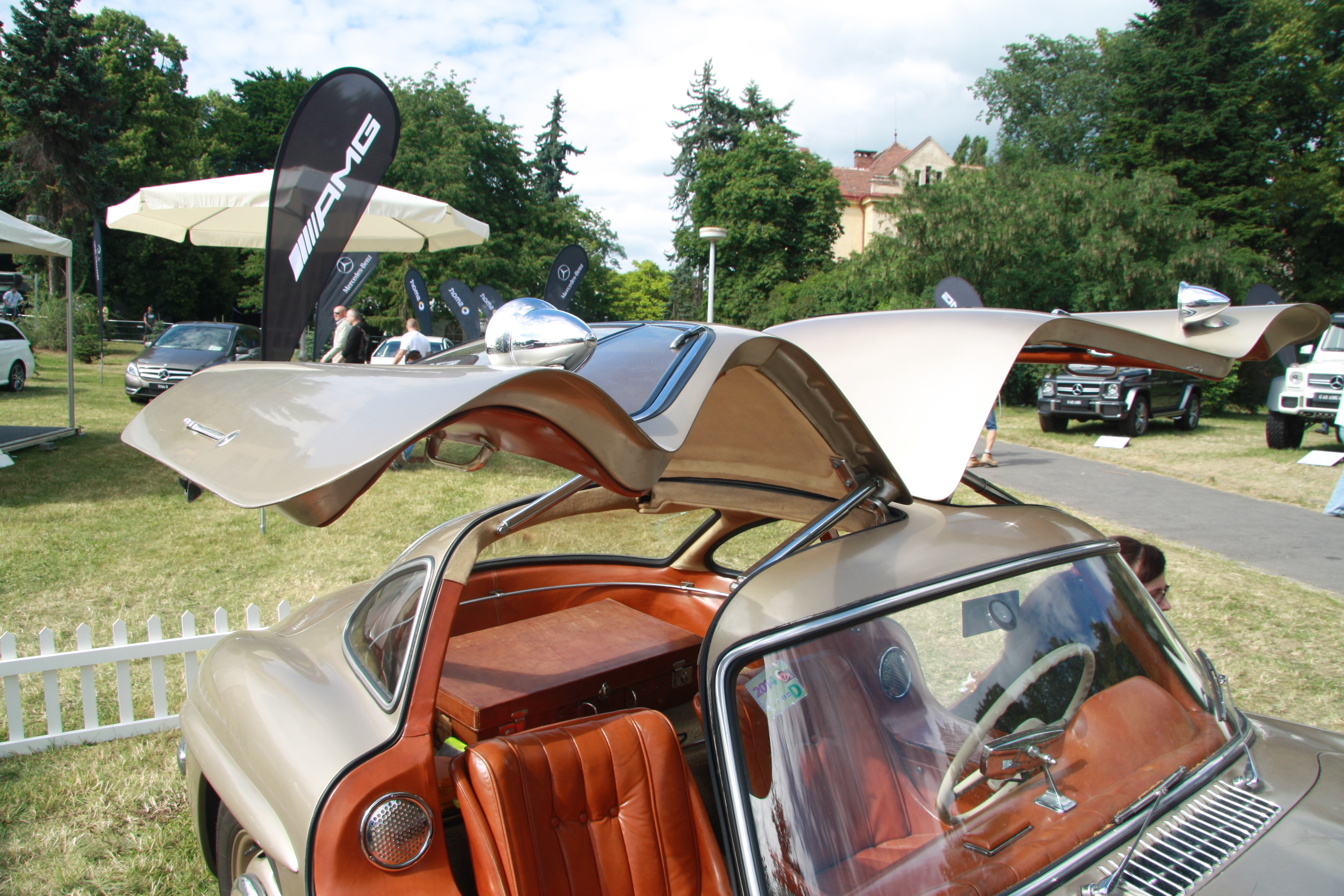
The car's tubular frame limited luggage capacity in the coupé.

=== Exterior ===
The body consists mainly of sheet steel, with the bonnet, boot lid, dashboard, sill, and door skins made of aluminum. Silver-grey was the standard color; all others were options.

The objective of the overall design was to make the vehicle as streamlined as possible. The width of the tubular frame along the cockpit allowed the cabin roofline to be inset considerably on both sides, dramatically reducing the front area. The structure was also quite high between the wheels, prohibiting the attachment of standard doors. The only option – already used on the W194 race car – which would allow passengers over its high, deep sill was a gullwing door.

The car’s distinctive eyebrows are a functional feature in the front, both physically and aerodynamically deflecting road water from the windscreen, and stylistic in the rear, added for visual symmetry.

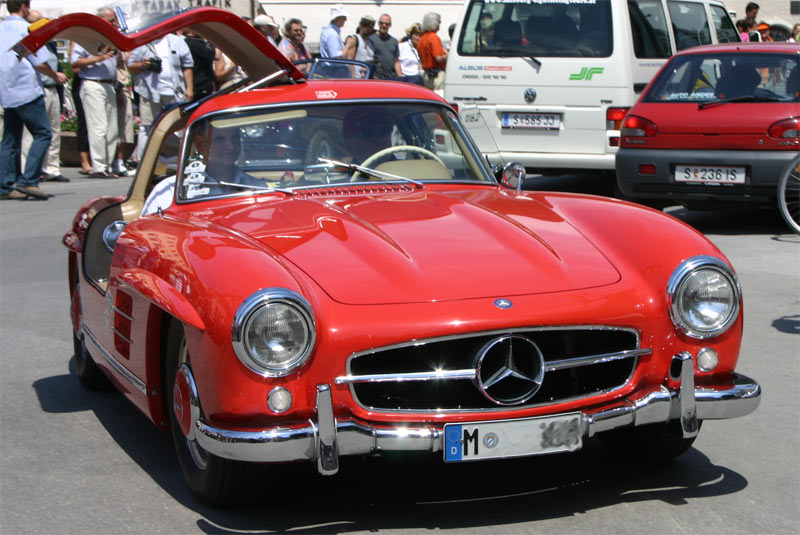
Any color other than metallic silver cost extra.

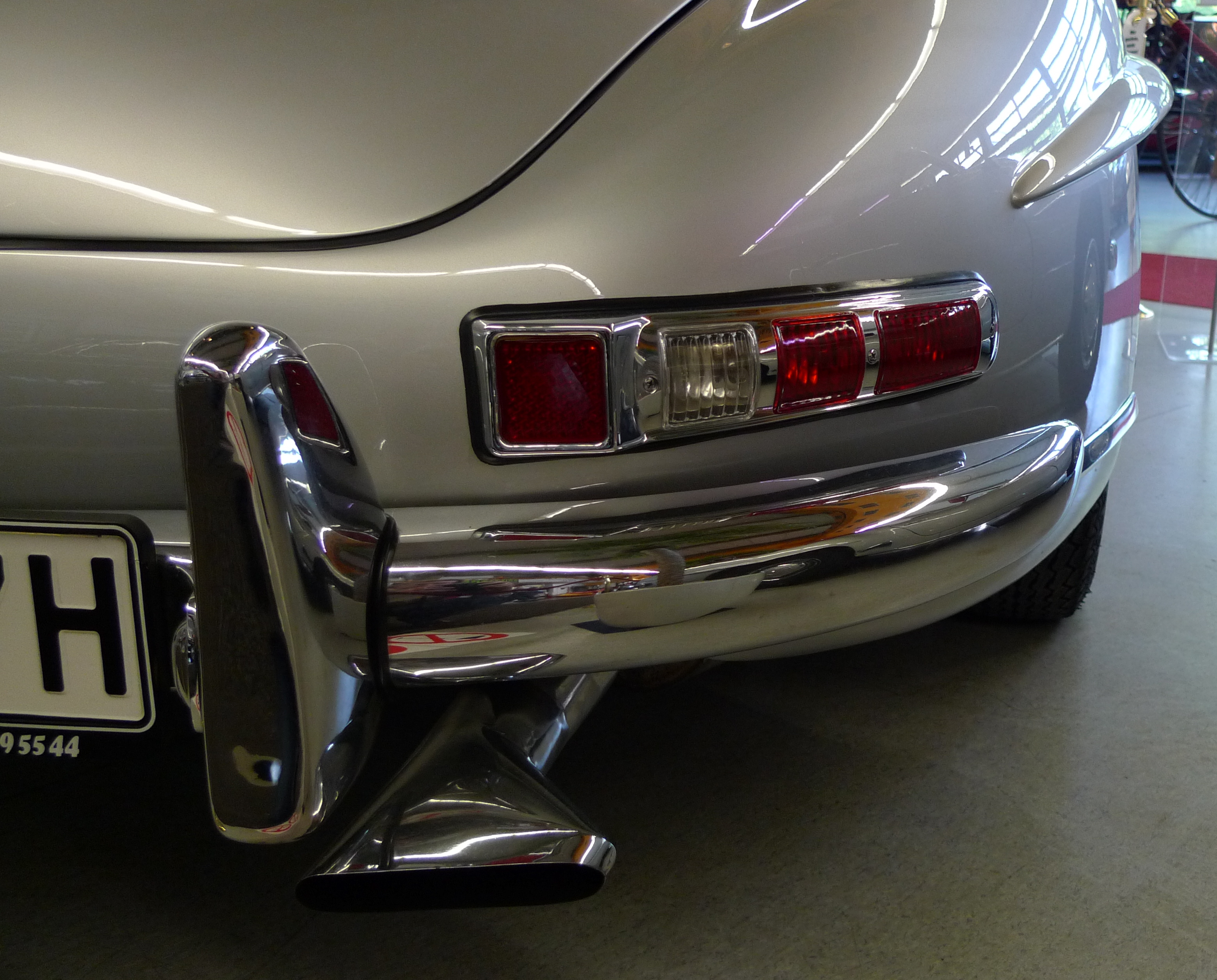
Detail of a restored coupé

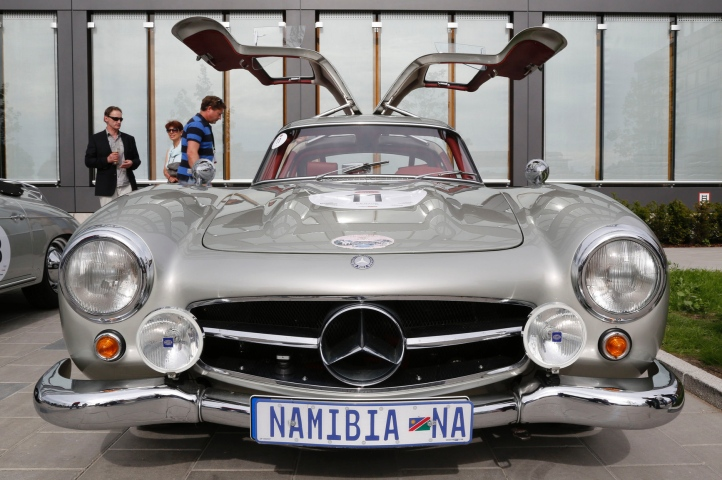
The gullwing look

=== Engine ===
The Mercedes-Benz M198 engine is a water-cooled 3.0 L, 182.8 cu in, 2,996 cc overhead cam straight six. Like the racing Mercedes-Benz M194, the 300 SL borrowed the basic two-valves-per-cylinder M186 engine from the regular four-door 300 (W186 "Adenauer") luxury touring car introduced in 1951.

It featured the M186's aluminum head: a 30-degree diagonal base, allowing larger intake and exhaust valves than a standard horizontal joint with the engine block. To improve performance, the M198 replaced the W194's triple two-barrel Solex carburetors with a Bosch mechanical direct fuel-injection system. This raised output on the 300 SL from 175 hp (130 kW; 177 PS) SAE gross to 240 hp (179 kW; 243 PS) SAE gross at 6,100 rpm. Compression was set at 8.55:1.

300 SL (W198)
Maximum power	240 hp (179 kW; 243 PS) SAE gross at 6,100 rpm / 212 hp (158 kW; 215 PS) @ 5,800 rpm DIN/
Maximum torque	294 N⋅m (217 lb⋅ft; 30 kg⋅m) SAE gross at 4,800 rpm / 203 lb⋅ft (275 N⋅m; 28 kg⋅m) @ 4,600 rpm; DIN

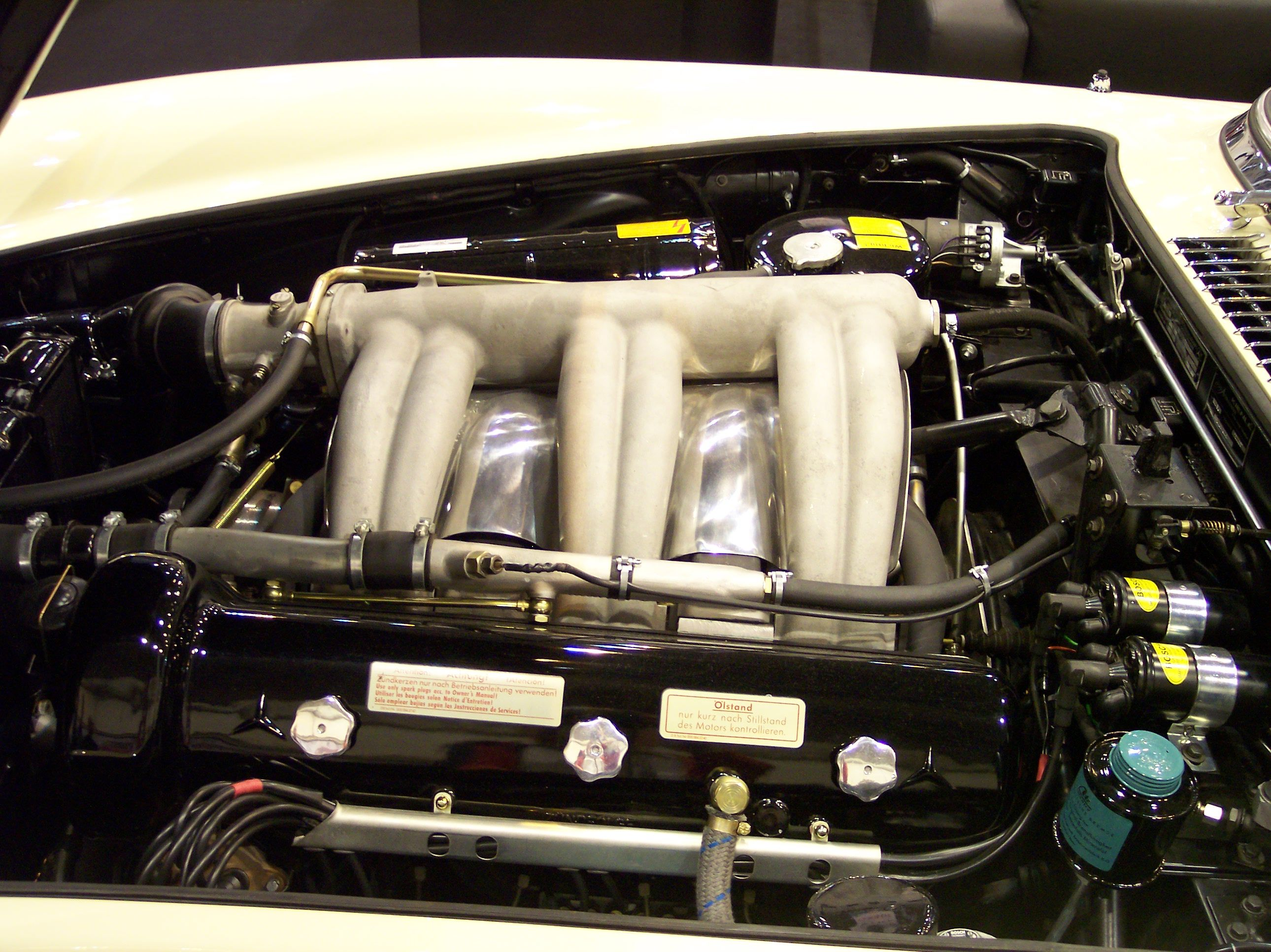
The M198 OHC line-6 engine, with its sand-cast aluminum intake manifold

Another performance feature was dry sump lubrication, which ensured proper oil distribution in high-speed cornering and reduced engine height by eliminating a traditional oil pan. A more-powerful version of the M198, with a radical sports camshaft and 9.5:1 compression ratio, could be ordered free of additional charge for the coupé. The roadster had this engine only in its 1957 debut year. For the M198 engine to be installed in a low-profile car, it was tilted 50 degrees toward the driver's side. The result was aerodynamic efficiency and an enormous, sand-cast aluminum intake manifold as wide as the engine.

The engine was coupled by a single-disc dry clutch to a four-speed transmission with gear ratios of 3.34:1, 1.97:1, 1.39:1, and 1:1, and a reverse ratio of 2.73:1. The stock rear-axle ratio at the beginning of production was 1:3.42; at the 41st vehicle, it was changed to 1:3.64 for better acceleration. It allows a top speed of 235 km/h (146 mph) and acceleration from 0 to 100 km/h (62 mph) in 9.3 seconds. Faster acceleration was provided with ratios of 1:3.89 and 1:4.11. The lowest final-gear ratio, 1:3.25, delivered a top speed of up to 263 km/h (163 mph) and made the 300 SL the fastest production car of its time. City drivers found the tall first gear challenging. Clutch-pedal operation was initially cumbersome, remedied by an improved clutch-arm helper spring.

Unlike present-day electronic fuel-injection systems, the 300 SL's mechanical fuel pump would continue cycling so long as the engine turned over, maintaining the mechanical direct fuel-injection system's pressure, which would continue to inject gasoline into the cylinders during the interval between ignition shut-off and the engine's coming to a stop. This extra fuel washed away the oil film critical to an engine during start-up, and led to oil dilution, excessive ring wear, and scouring of the cylinder walls. Exacerbating the problem was the engine's dry-sump lubrication system, with its large oil cooler and enormous 15 L (4.0 US gal) oil capacity, which virtually guaranteed that the oil would not get hot enough to flow properly on the short trips frequently taken by most car owners. Owners might block off airflow through the oil cooler and stick rigidly to the appropriately low 1,600 km (1,000 mi) recommended oil-change interval. An auxiliary fuel pump provided additional fuel for extended high-speed operation (or cold starts), but overuse could also lead to oil dilution. From March 1963 to the end of production later that year, a light alloy engine block was installed in 209 vehicles.

=== Chassis ===
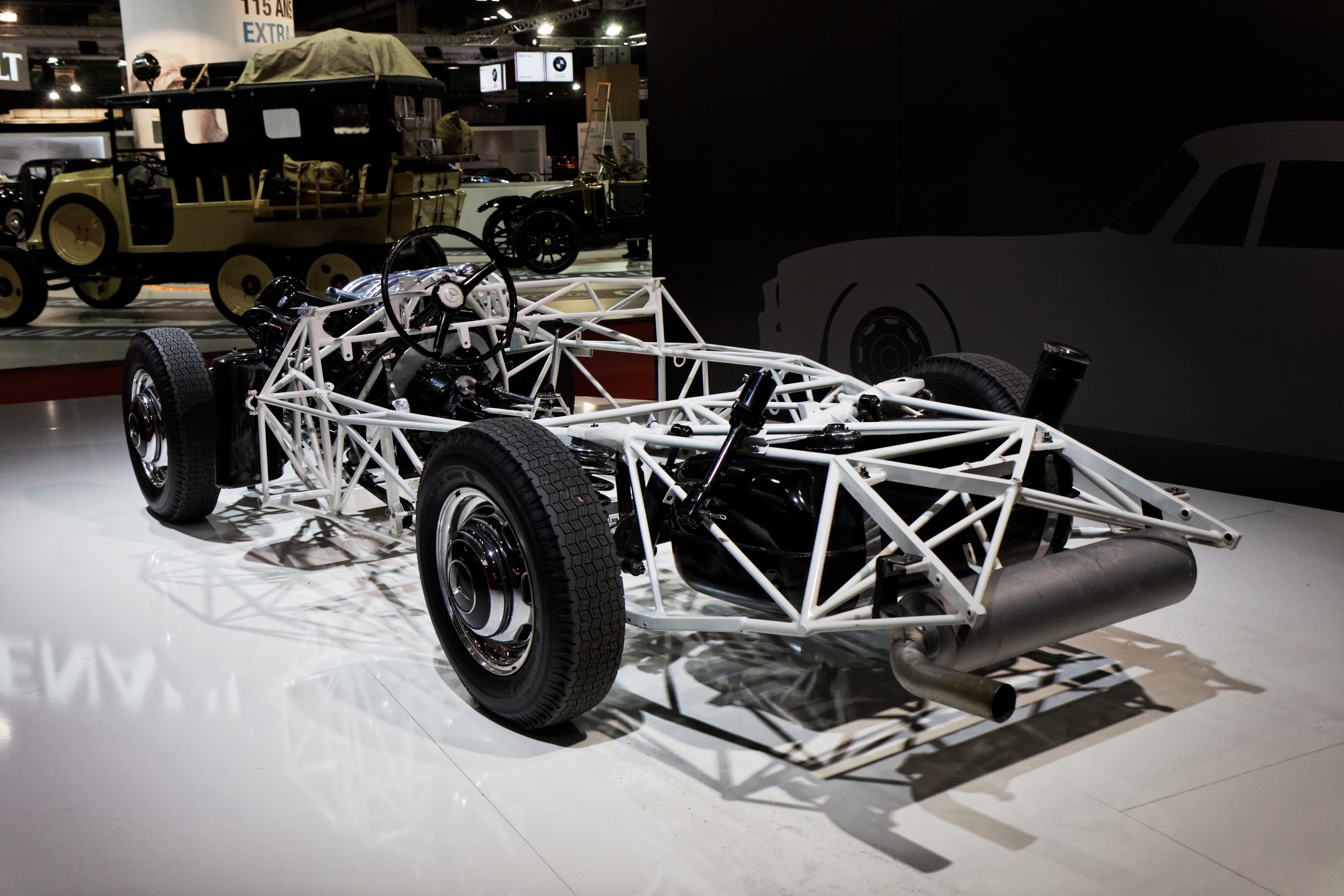
The 300 SL's tubular frame

Like modern racing cars, the 300 SL has a tubular frame, designed by Mercedes head engineer Rudolf Uhlenhaut and made of chrome-molybdenum steel. Such a frame provided high rigidity with low mass. Thin straight tubes were assembled as triangles, with the finished frame weighing a remarkable 82 kilograms (181 pounds). Elements of the coupé frame fill span the entire width of the vehicle’s track from wheel to wheel, making for an unusually high and deep threshold for access to the passenger compartment. The upper tube is so high it is level with the driver's elbow, making conventional hinged doors infeasible. The resulting design—upward opening "gullwing" doors—gave the car its iconic nickname.

=== Suspension ===
The 300 SL's 4-wheel independent suspension was borrowed heavily from the regular Mercedes-Benz W186 "Adenauer" luxury tourer, given a sportier tuning. Front-to-rear weight distribution is almost exactly in the center of the vehicle.

The front suspension consists of unequal-length double wishbones, coil springs, hydraulic telescopic shock absorbers, and an anti-roll bar.

The rear has a low-pivot swing axle, radius arms, and coil springs. Being jointed only at the differential (lacking a modern constant velocity joint as used today with independent suspension), the swing axle could make rear end cornering treacherous at high speeds or on bad roads due to extreme changes in camber. This was remedied in the roadster by switching to a high-pivot geometry.

The recirculating ball steering was relatively precise for its time, and the independent suspension allowed for a reasonably-comfortable ride and markedly-better overall handling.

=== Brakes ===
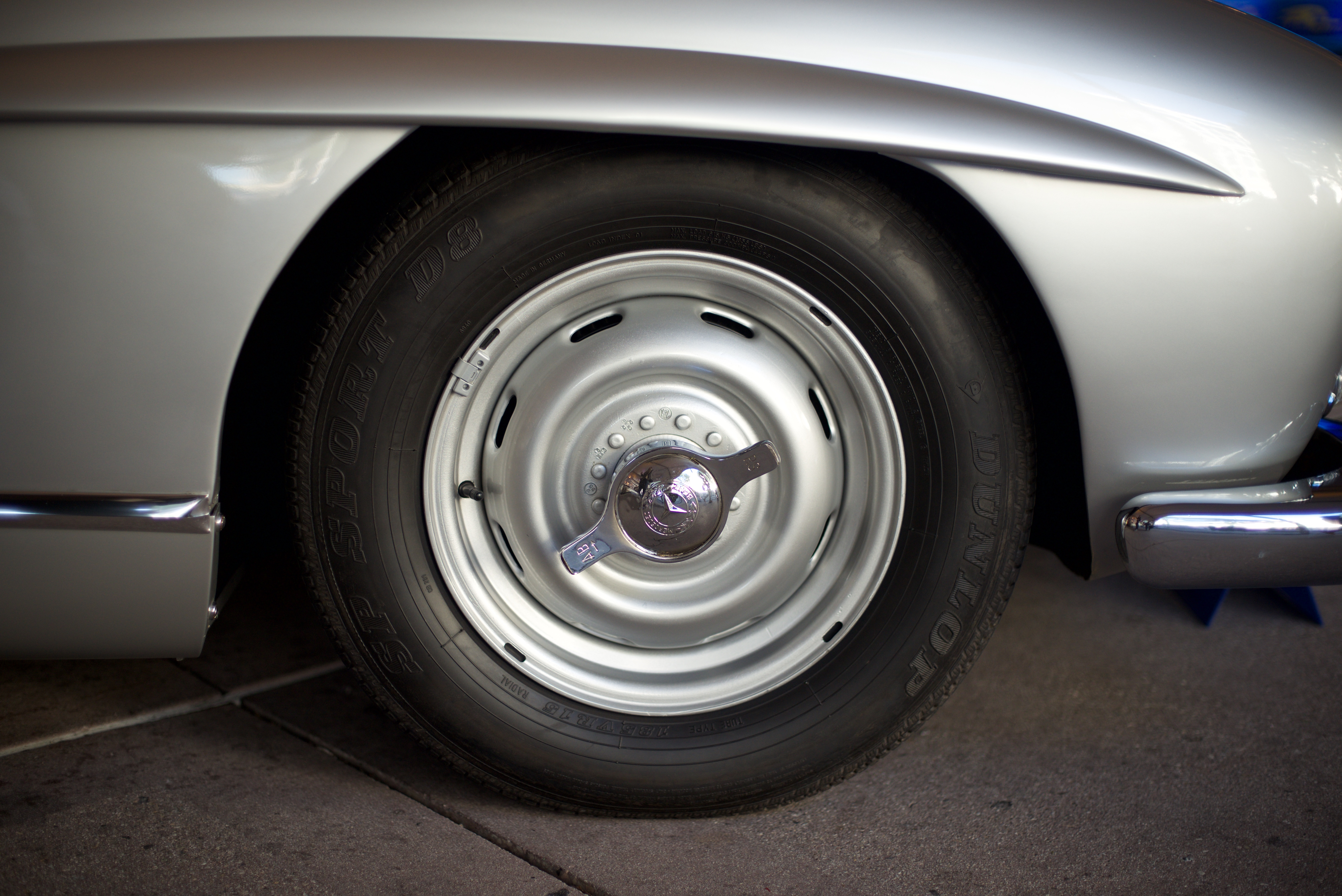
Rudge rims and eyebrow

The 300SL had the same 1,470-square-centimetre (227.9 sq in) self-cooled, finned drum brakes as the Mercedes 300S. A brake booster drew vacuum from the intake manifold to assist pedal effort. Brake shoes were 90 millimetres (4 in) wide. The front drums had double cylinders, the rear single. The handbrake was mechanical, acting only on the rear wheels. In March 1961 290-millimetre (11.4 in) disc brakes replaced drums all round.

The wheels were riveted steel hub/aluminum rim. The roadster's wheels were larger than the coupé's. Rudge 5J × 15-inch rims were a valuable option. The tires were 6.50-15 inches on the coupé and 6.70–15 on the roadster.

== Roadster ==
In mid-1956, sales of the 300SL Gullwing began to decline, prompting the Mercedes-Benz board to consider a convertible version tailored to the California market. A prototype was showcased at the Geneva Motor Show in March 1957, and by May the factory had been converted for roadster production.

As the gullwing coupe the roadster was adapted from did not have conventional doors, its alloy-steel tubular frame was redesigned to lower its sills, create strong points for door hinges, make space for a proper trunk, and reinforce the frame for rigidity lost transforming it from a coupe to an open car. In spite of following the coupe's lead and using aluminum panels for the hood, trunk lid, door skins, sills, floors, and bulkhead, the roadster gained 35 kg (77 lb), bringing the new car's weight up to 1,330 kg (2,930 lb).

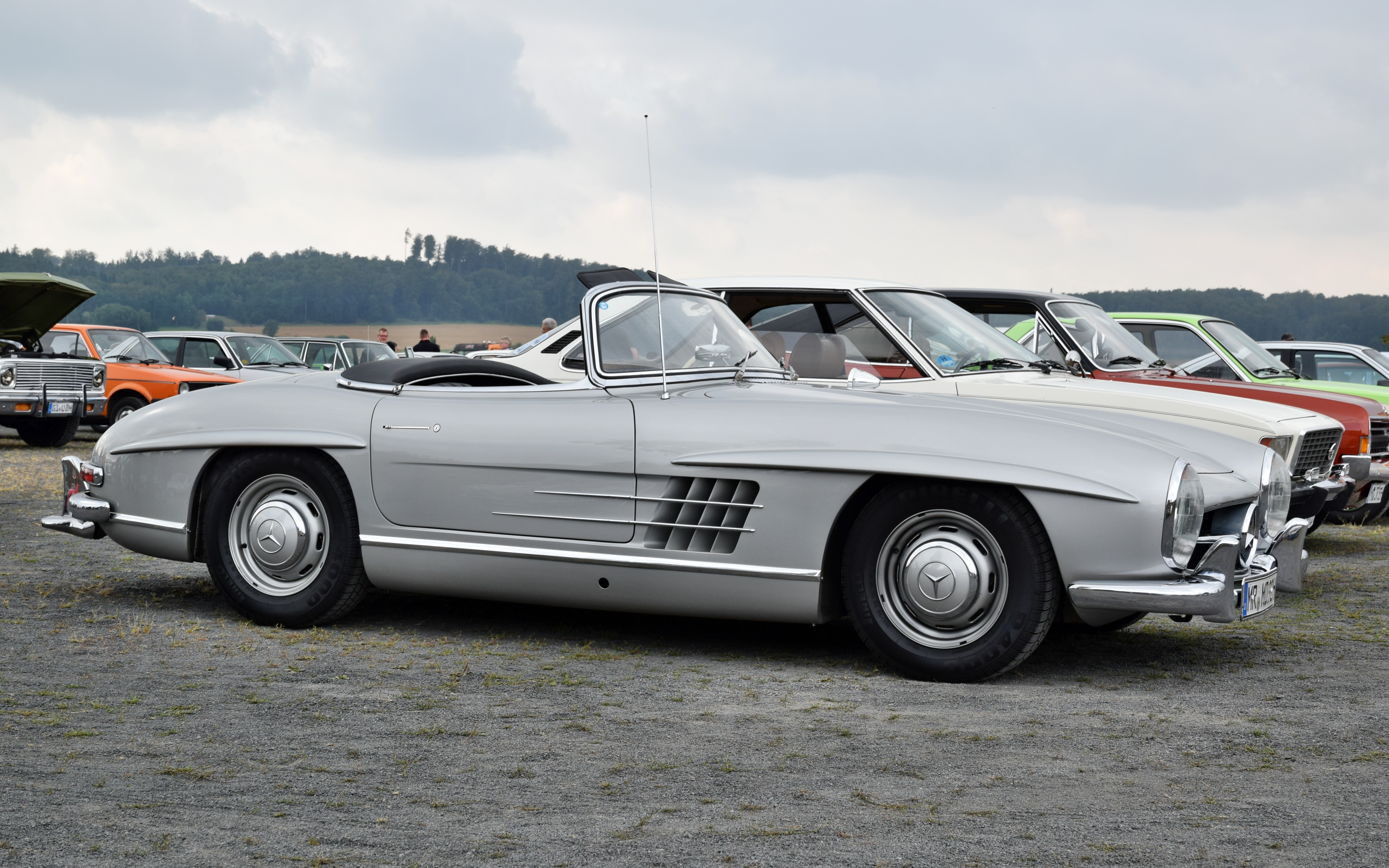
The roadster was produced from 1957 to 1963.

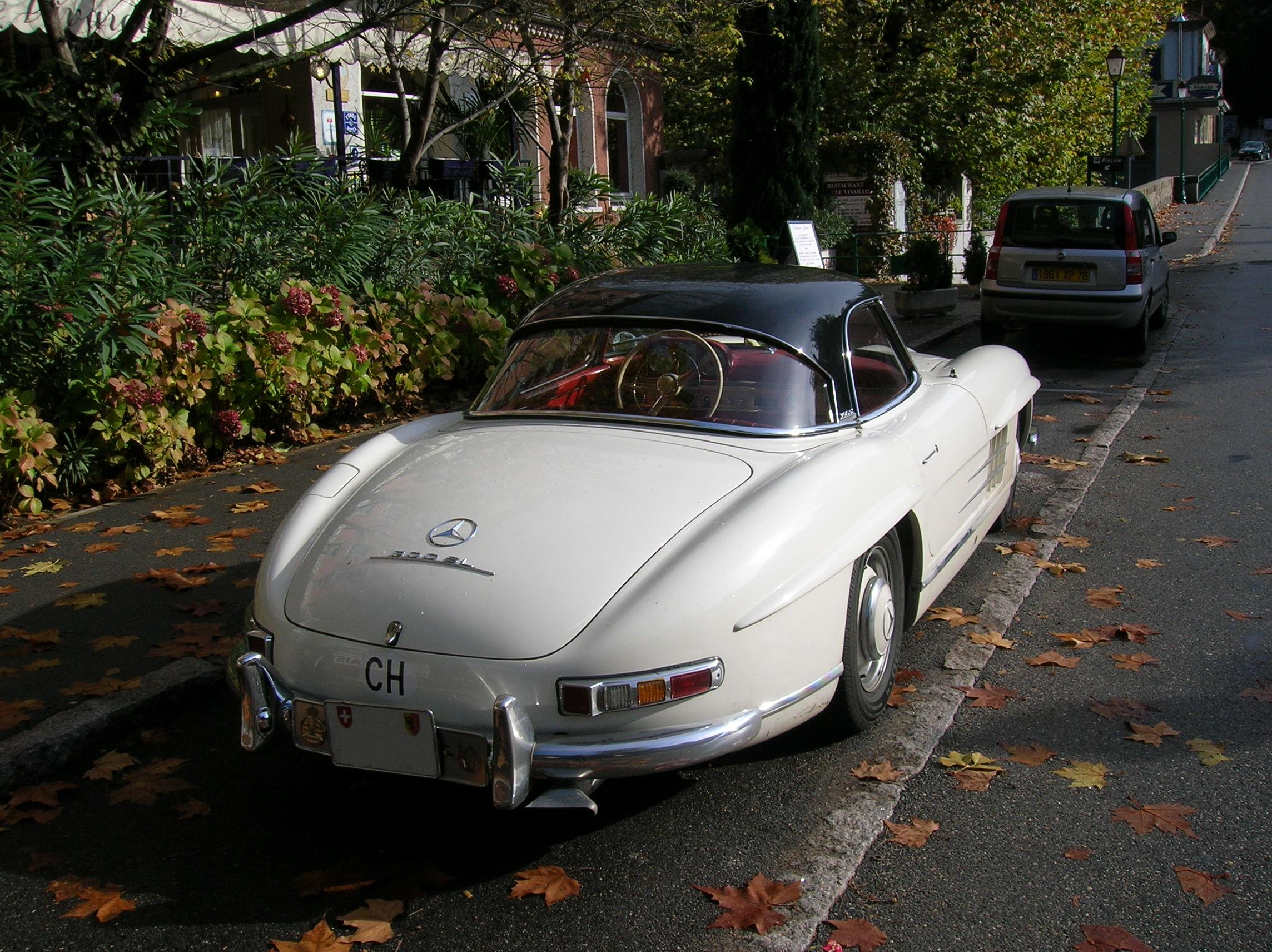
300 SL hardtop roadster

Mechanically, the M198 engine power was boosted to 240 hp (179 kW), and the rear suspension enhanced by lowering the swing axle's pivot point 87 millimetres (3.4 in) below the differential centerline. The resulting notable improvements in handling and ride comfort were not lost on lead engineer, Rudolf Uhlenhaut, who had sought the design on the coupe but been rebuffed by the Mercedes board, which opted to utilize an existing inventory of approximately 3,000 axle units to offset the vehicle's already high production costs.

Not only was the considerably more driver-friendly roadster easier to get in and out of, it was available with custom configured leather luggage to maximize trunk space gained by moving the spare tire beneath its floor and shrinking the fuel tank.

Originally, the roadster came with a stowable soft top. In September 1958, an optional weatherproof hardtop became available. It proved such an attractive option that in spite of its considerable 1,500 Deutschmark price it proved the most popular option, so popular Mercedes began to offer the roadster without the soft top (for a 750 Deutschmark discount off its 1958 price of 34,000 Deutschmarks).

Production ended in February 1963, after a run of 1,858 roadsters - the last Mercedes-Benz car to be built on a separate frame.

== Racing ==
Mercedes decided to return to international motorsport at the beginning of the 1950s, and Alfred Neubauer was again entrusted with the task. In 1951, the company built five V8 W165 cars and engines to enter the Grand Prix. Ferrari's V12 performed well at Silverstone, however, and Neubauer knew that the W165 could not win; Mercedes began planning a V12 W195. The FIA sporting commission changed the rules for 1954 in October 1951, and the W195s could not compete; the company began to develop a six-cylinder 300 SL for racing. Its doors originally extended onto the bottom of the side windows, and access through them required a removable steering wheel.

=== 1952 ===
The 300 SL's first race was the 1952 Mille Miglia. The 1,564-kilometre (972 mi) race was from Brescia to Rome and back, pitting Karl Kling's 300 SL against Giovanni Bracco's new 3-liter V-12 Ferrari. Bracco won, besting the second place Mercedes by four minutes and 32 seconds. Driving a car with a less-powerful engine, Rudolf Caracciola placed fourth.

Two weeks after the Mille Miglia, the original four cars raced at Bern before the Grand Prix. Concerned that Le Mans officials would not accept the gullwing-door design, Daimler-Benz revised the door down into the side of the body. Rear-brake locking was a continuing problem for the 300 SL; Caracciola's coupé hit a tree head-on, and he did not race again. Kling, Hermann Lang and Fritz Riess finished first, second and third when the 4.1-liter Ferrari broke down at the start.

Three new cars were built for the 24 Hours of Le Mans race in June. The engines were detuned for the long race to 166 bhp, and the fuel-tank filler rose above the rear window. The team brought an experimental spare car with a rooftop air brake which folded flat until the driver activated it. The unusual brake design unnerved the other drivers. The brake was effective; at 100 mph it could exert a deceleration of up to 0.2 g, but it also weakened the supporting pylons. The cars used more tires than expected, and Kling and Hans Klenk were forced out of the race by a generator failure. Lang and Riess won the race with an average speed of 155.574 kilometres per hour (96.669 mph), and Theo Helfrich and Helmut Niedermayr placed second.

The 142-mile (229 km) Nürburgring race on August 2 was held on a challenging track. The competition shifted to Jaguar and Alfa Romeo. Nürburgring required a light, powerful car; aerodynamics were less critical, so the top of the coupé was removed (creating a 300 SL roadster with the rear deck and the passenger's side covered by an aluminum cover). All four cars raced at Nürburgring in unsupercharged form after trials indicated no benefit with a supercharged engine, which was no faster than the standard 300 SL. The team concluded that the car's relatively-crude swing-axle rear suspension was already at its limit in transmitting power to the road, and the engine was less durable. Lang won the race, with Kling and Riess finishing second and third. This was the official end of the company's efforts with the 300 SL, it felt that it had done all it could with the six-cylinder racers and would focus on the Grand Prix.

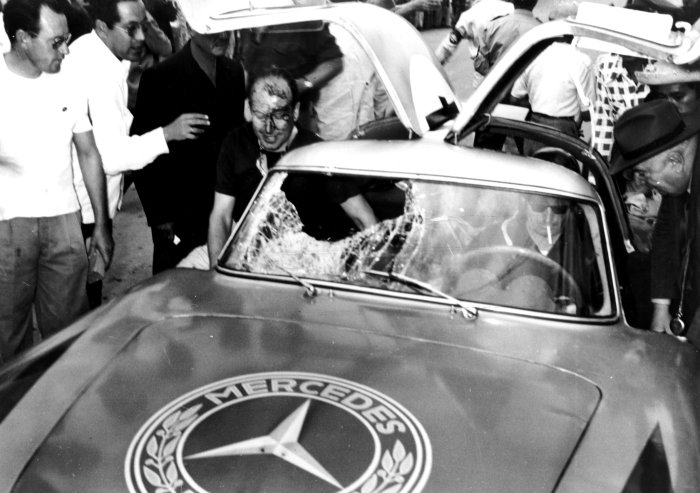
The 300 SL won the 1952 Carrera Panamericana in Mexico—despite hitting a buzzard.

For a final outing, the company (pressured by the Daimler-Benz representative in Mexico City) sent Mexico two 3 1/2-ton trucks and 35 people to compete in the third Carrera Panamericana. Two 300 SL coupés and two roadsters were updated with right-side exhaust and new window molding. Since there was no three-liter class, the cylinder displacement was increased to 3.1 liters to provide 177 bhp. Continental did not have the time (or expertise) to make special tires for the event, so the company sent 300 tires of different types. Lang hit a dog, and Kling struck a buzzard in the early stages at a speed of 135 miles per hour (217 km/h). The 300 SLs did better later, overtaking the lead Ferrari driven by Bracco. Kling and Klenk finished first, ahead of Lang and Erwin Grupp. A 1-2-3 finish might have been the final result, but American John Fitch was disqualified for allowing a mechanic to touch his car on the next-to-last day.

The race team prepared a new version of the 300 SL for the 1953 season; the 300 SLK would be lighter, with a shorter wheelbase, larger wheels, fuel injection, and better brakes. After Mercedes prioritized its efforts on a new Grand Prix car, however, the 300 SLK was canceled.

=== Mid-1950s ===
Werner Engel won the 1955 European Rally Championship in a 300 SL. Stirling Moss won the overall title at the 1955 Mille Miglia in a 300 SLR racing car, and John Fitch won his class in a production 300 SL coupé. The marathon Liege-Rome-Liege rally was won in 1955 by Olivier Gendebien, and in 1956 by Willy Mairesse. A 300 SL won the Sports Car Club of America Class D championship from 1955 to 1957.

=== Racing roadster ===
Although roadsters were made for touring, Daimler-Benz marketed its roadster by racing on American tracks. Since production began, the Sports Car Club of America could not admit the roadster as a standard model for the 1957 season; it would have to compete in the Class D sports-racing car class with other three-liter cars such as the Maserati 300S, Ferrari Monza, and Aston Martin DB3S. The O'Shea-Tilp team used a lightened roadster with drilled front coil-spring mounts, no fan, a welded sheet-aluminum inlet manifold, and twin exhaust-pipe outlets. The roadster (sometimes known as the SLS) won the 1957 Class D Sports championship with triple the points of its nearest competitor, Carroll Shelby's Maserati.

=== 1957–present ===
Horácio Macedo finished second in the 1960 Rali Vinho da Madeira. Former Gull Wing Group International president Bob Sirna set a Bonneville Speedway F/GT three-liter sports-car speed record of 190.759 mph (306.997 km/h) in a modified coupé in 2016.

== Reception and sales ==
Sales quintupled in the model's second year but dropped off over the next three years. Roadster sales were initially high before leveling off to about 200 a year. Initially, the model was distributed only by Max Hoffman, later on by the Studebaker-Packard Corporation.

=== Production numbers ===
	1954	1955	1956	1957	1958	1959	1960	1961	1962	1963	Total	Known to exist in 1994
Coupe	166	856	308	70							1,400	1,200
Roadster				618	267	200	241	256	182	94	1,858	1,458
Total	166	856	308	688	267	200	241	256	182	94	3,258	2,658

== Legacy ==
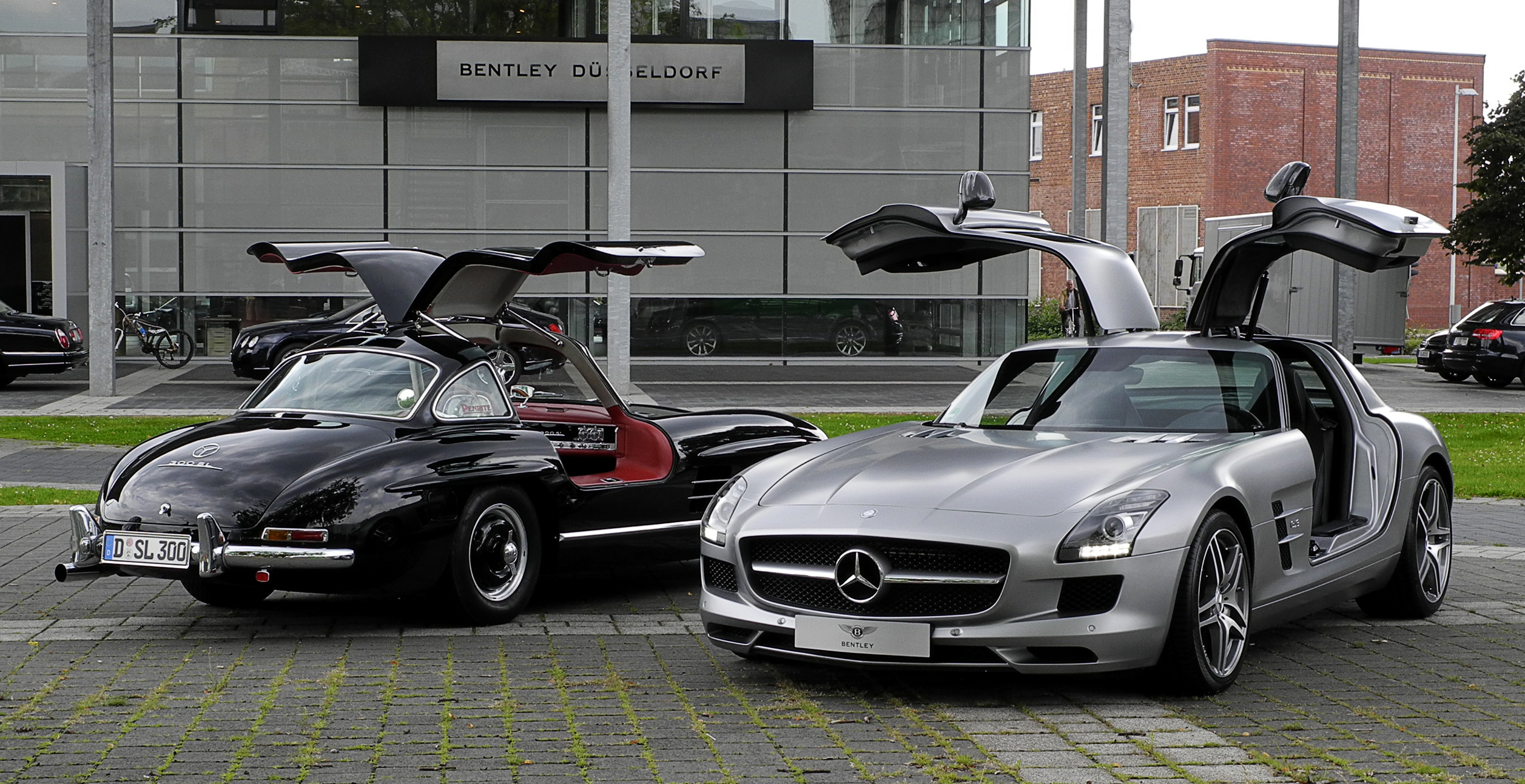
A 300 SL (left) and an SLS AMG

Building on the 1954 debut of the 300 SL, a less-expensive, 1.9-liter roadster was introduced the following year as the 190 SL. The latter was succeeded by the then only SL in the Mercedes line, the 230 SL, in 1963, produced in increasing displacement and cost up to a 280 SL through 1971. Subsequent SL generations include the R107 (variously produced in models and displacements from 280 SL to 560 SL from 1971 to 1989) and the R129 (likewise, in 280 SL through 600 SL from 1989 to 2001).

The two generations of the SL that have followed are grand tourers available as coupe convertibles.

The gullwing-door V8 SLS AMG debuted in 2009 as the spiritual successor of the original 300 SL coupé. Produced through the end of 2014, it was replaced by the AMG GT, with traditional doors.

Mercedes-Benz 300 SL owners are supported by Gull Wing Group International, which began in 1961.

== Replicas ==
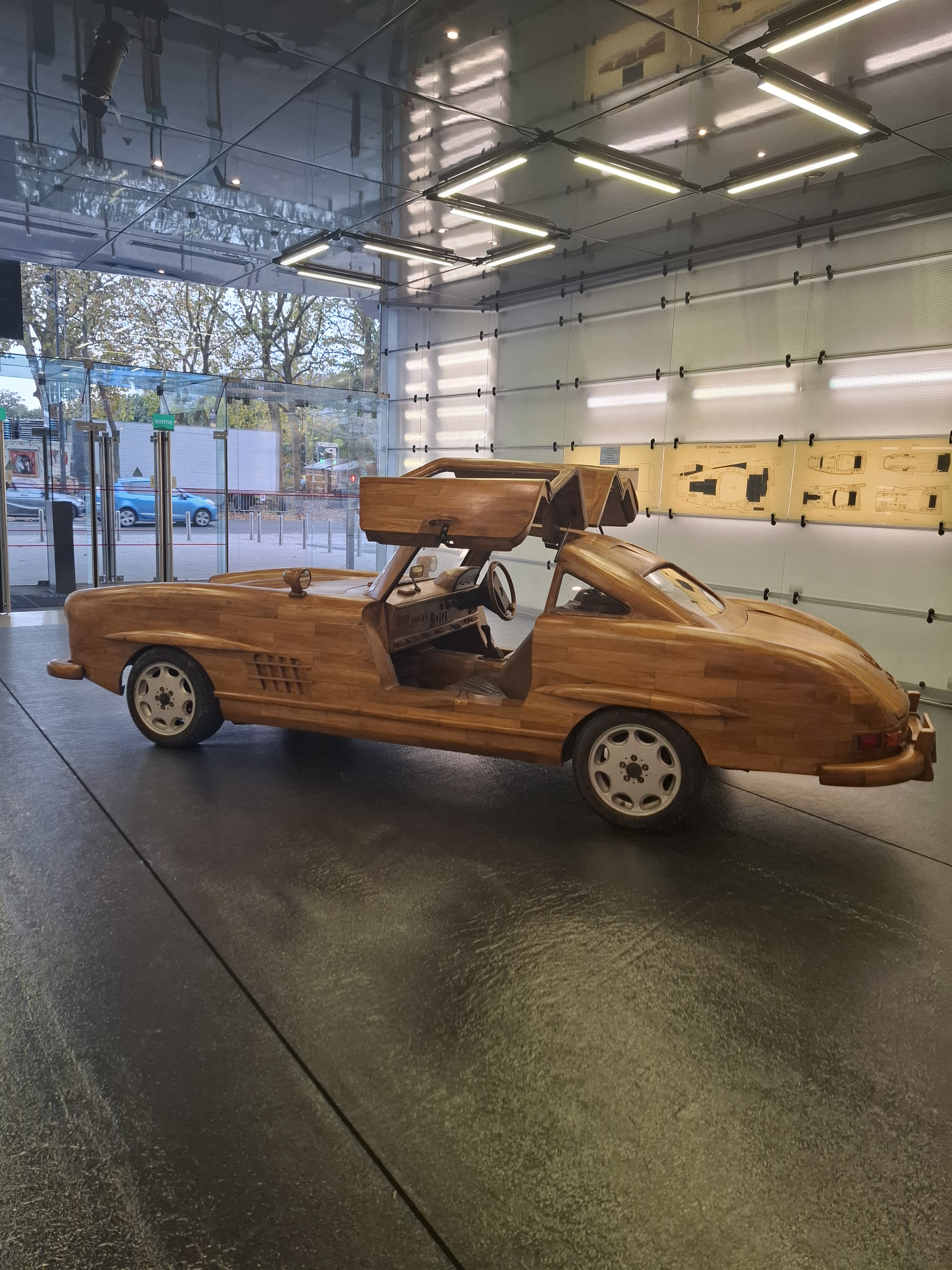
La Belle Castelle, a 300 SL from wood by Rémi Le Forestier

The Mercedes-Benz 300 SL was always popular with replica manufacturers. Mercedes-Benz, however, obtained a court order prohibiting faithful reproductions of the 300 SL, as the car's design is protected. For example, the Mercedes 300 SL Gullwing[40] and Mercedes 300 SL Roadster[41] models were produced in Germany by the Bavarian automobile manufacturer Scheib. Scheib initially built both models on its own chassis frames. The drivetrain and suspension, however, were taken from the Mercedes-Benz W 124. The Gullwing and Gullwing Roadster replicas came from Switzerland.

This legendary car has inspired many artists, some of whom have created life-size wooden replicas of artworks. One notable example is La Belle Castelle, a fully functional, life-size wooden replica of the iconic 300 SL, crafted by French artist Rémi Le Forestier. He created it as a tribute to actor Alain Delon, who owned a car of this model in the 1950s.
