= Alex Hirschi =

Australian automotive vlogger (born 1985)

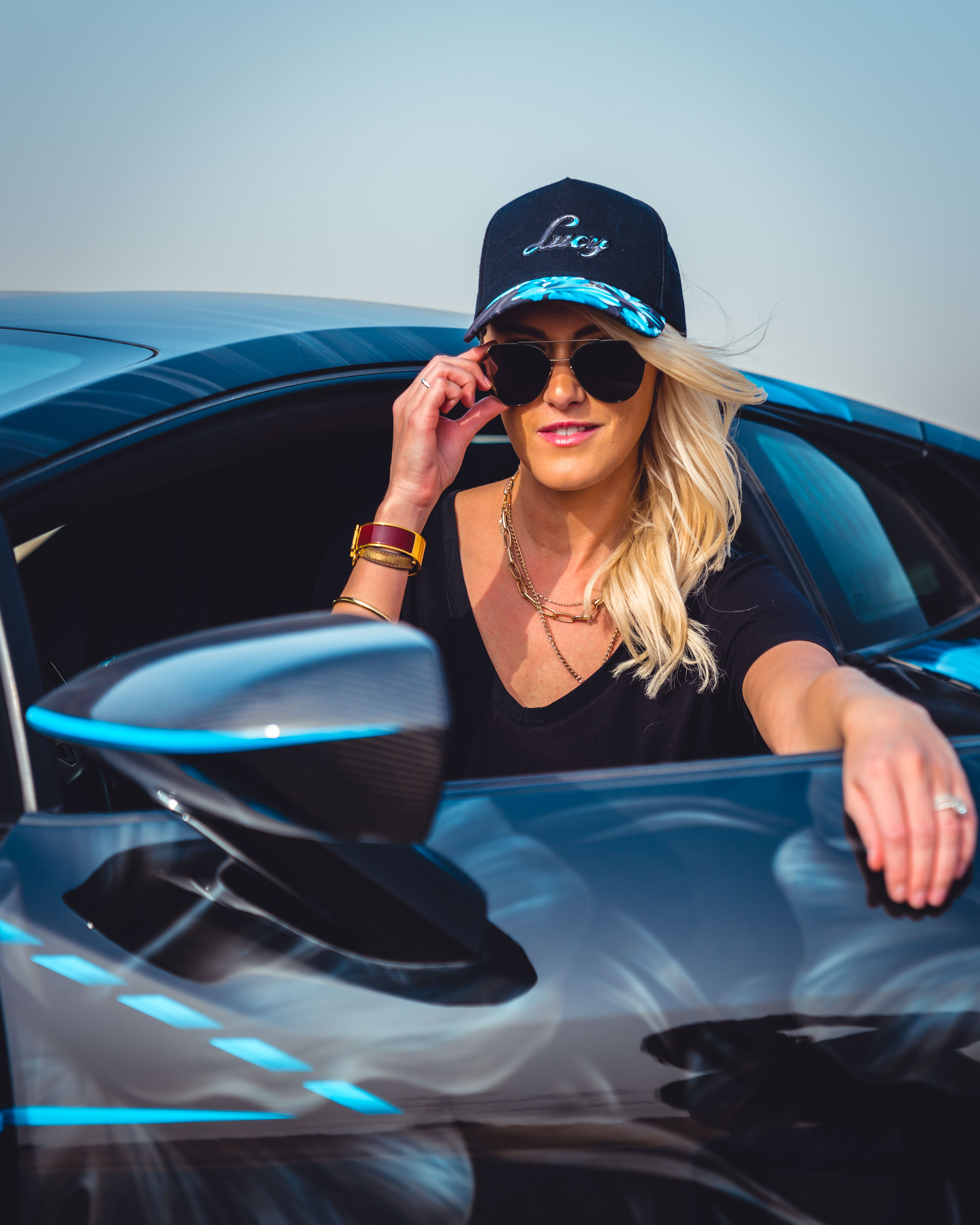
- Hirschi pictured in 2019
- Born: Alexandra Mary Darvall; 21 September 1985 (age 41); Brisbane, Queensland, Australia
- Other name: Supercar Blondie

YouTube information
- Channel: Supercar Blondie
- Years active: 2017 –present
- Genre: Automotive
- Views: 11 billion
- Last updated: October 2024
- Website: supercarblondie.com

Alexandra Mary Hirschi (née Darvall; born 21 September 1985), known online as Supercar Blondie, is an Australian social media celebrity, presenter, and vlogger based in Dubai, United Arab Emirates. She is best known for her automotive videos, which she posts on a regular basis on Facebook, Instagram and YouTube. Her Facebook page has hit 62 million followers, her Instagram over 12.8 million followers, and she has over 21 million subscribers on YouTube. According to Socialbakers, her Facebook page was globally the fastest growing auto page in 2018.

== Personal life ==
Born in Brisbane, Australia, Hirschi had a passion for cars at an early age. The first car she owned was a Mitsubishi Lancer. Hirschi studied Journalism & Business at Queensland University of Technology before moving to Dubai in 2008. For 9 years, she was a newsreader and presenter for a talk radio show on Dubai Eye 10.8, where she interviewed many celebrities including John Travolta, Jake Gyllenhaal and Liam Neeson. In 2018, she left the radio show and became a full-time video creator on social media.

== Career ==
Hirschi's social media presence allows automotive brands like Bugatti and Ferrari to advertise their products through her. Instead of being an automotive journalist, she states that she provides "insight into the supercar culture and what it’s like to drive these incredible cars in a light, fun way." Being one of the few women in supercar culture, she also opens up the demographic for these vehicles.

In March 2018, Arabian Business listed her as one of the 50 Most Influential Women In The Arab World, and it nominated her in 2019 as one of Top 30 most influential women in the Arab world. Also in March 2018, Esquire Magazine Middle East named her Influencer of the Year.

She appeared on Germany's free to air TV RTL II on the car show GRIP Das Automagazin on 10 June 2018, co-presenting the one-off Bugatti L'Or Blanc and the La Ferrari Aperta.

In January 2019, Broadcasting & Cable announced Hirschi will be hosting their new car TV show Car Crews. The show is released on Insight TV and focuses on uncovering different car cultures across the United States.

She has driven the official Batmobile from the feature film Batman (1989). The best watched non car video on her YouTube channel is on the submersible of U-Boat Worx. Which she herself followed up with a video of their newest model, the SuperSub.

In 2020 Hirschi won a Shorty Award for Breakout YouTuber.

In 2026 Super Car Blondie Media Group signed a long term agreement with Wavelength and Extreme International founders of the Extreme Sports Channel to source and develop commercial opportunities for Alex across brand partnership, brand licensing, IP and format development.

== Filmography ==
=== Television ===
Year	Series	Role	Notes
2018	Grip	Herself	Episode: Dubai
2019	Top Gear	Herself	Episode: Dubai
2019–present	Car Crews	Host/Herself	7 episodes

=== Video games ===
Year	Game	Role	Notes
2023	The Crew Motorfest	Herself	Dream Cars playlist presenter

== See also ==
- Australian bloggers
- Supercar
