= Mercedes-Benz S-Class =

Full-size luxury car

Overview
- Manufacturer: Daimler-Benz (1972–1998); DaimlerChrysler (1998–2007); Daimler AG (2007–2022); Mercedes-Benz Group (2022–present)
- Production: 1954–present (S-Class nomenclature adopted since 1972)

Body and chassis
- Class: Full-size luxury car (F); Grand tourer (S) (coupé and convertible models)
- Body style: 4-door sedan 2-door coupé (1992–2021); 2-door convertible (2014–2021)
- Related: Mercedes-Benz CL-Class; Mercedes-Benz CLS-Class; Mercedes-Benz SL-Class

Chronology
- Predecessor: Mercedes-Benz W187

The Mercedes-Benz S-Class, formerly known as "special class" (German: "Sonderklasse", abbreviated as "S-Klasse"), is a series of full-sized luxury sedans and coupés produced by the German automaker Mercedes-Benz. The S-Class is the designation for top-of-the-line Mercedes-Benz models and was officially introduced in 1972 with the W116, and has remained in use ever since. The S-Class is the flagship vehicle for Mercedes-Benz, being positioned above the other Mercedes-Benz models.

The S-Class has debuted many of the company's latest innovations, including drivetrain technologies, interior features, and safety systems (such as the first seatbelt pretensioners). The S-Class has ranked as the world's best-selling luxury sedan. In automotive terms, Sonderklasse refers to "a specially outfitted car." Although used colloquially for decades, following its official application in 1972, six generations of officially named S-Klasse sedans have been produced.

In 1981, the two-door, four-seat S-Class, designated as SEC, was introduced, sharing the petrol V8 engines with its four-door version, W126. After the introduction of a new nomenclature scheme, SEC was simply renamed as S-Class Coupé. For the 1996 model year, the coupé was separated from the S-Class line and named as new CL-Class (in line with other two-door models: CLK, SL, and SLK); however, the CL-Class was reintegrated into the S-Class model line (same with CLK becoming E-Class Coupé and Cabriolet). The first-ever S-Class convertible since 1972, internally named A217, was introduced and became a one-generation model only. After the end of W222 production in 2020, the successors to the C217 coupé and A217 convertible are not planned, citing the low demand for those models and stronger demand for SUV models.

== History ==
Pre-World War II Mercedes-Benz followed a nomenclature scheme by which each model would have its own numeric code, tied to the displacement of its engine. The logic was that the bigger the displacement, the more prestigious the car will be. This overall scheme was kept in the postwar time, however as the tooling and production facilities were much more limited, Mercedes-Benz adopted a more practical approach of using the "S" suffix to denote a model that was "Special" or Sonder in German. The figurative use of the word in commerce is to denote a product that is more upmarket than the parent version.

Early usage of the S suffix was applied liberally, for example the 1949-51 170S denoted a W136 car with a more modern chassis and larger body in both sedan can cabriolet types, as opposed to the regular W136 170V and 170D. After 1951, the 170S became the W191 chassis code, as a sedan in petrol and 170DS diesel version. In 1953 a hybrid 170S-D and 170S-V became the discount models in the marque's lineup until 1955. This illustrates a how flagship model will make the transition to an entry model in space of just four years. Elsewhere the S could be applied to denote a separate bodystyle, like the top range two door W188 300S opposed to the W186 300 limousine. In other times it would be applied to differentiate a facelifted model, as was the case with the W180 220 gaining the S suffix in 1986.

A more or less consisted application came about in the 1968 upon the launch of the /8 series, when the S-labelled cars now had their own bodies, chassis and powertrains. This was formalised in 1972 when Mercedes-Benz officially branded its premiere range as the Sonderklasse that included the new W116 sedans and the W107 two door coupes and roadsters. Whilst over the following two decades, the S-Class became an established brand, the nomenclature continued to come under increasing pressure in the 1980s in the unnamed 'standard' range which not only included the predecessors of the E-class, but also the compact W201 sedan, restricted to just the 190 series from 1982 and the W463 off-road G-wagen that began to be sold through regular Mercedes-Benz dealers in 1989. (As opposed to the commercially sold W460 and W461). The belonging of the SL roadster in the S-Class was also questionable, particularly after the launch of the R129 model, which shared many chassis elements with the standard range W124.

The launch of the W201 successor, the W202 in spring of 1993 ultimately forced Mercedes-Benz to completely review the branding of its cars. The W202, unlike the W201, which envisioned to appeal to the younger generation, had more restrained contours to be marketed as a compact sedan, with a range of engines. For this a third, entry level, Compact, or C-Class was created, and to avoid confusion with the existing nomenclature, where C suffix denoted a Coupe body, a prefix was used instead, e.g. C 220. The clientele took the notion well, and in summer of 1993 Mercedes-Benz had the rest of the products undergo a major re-branding into set classes, which were de-facto already in existence: the G-Class, the SL-Class and the newly created E-Class, where the E prefix, was taken for the most commonly used Einspritz, or fuel injection models. (Mercedes-Benz withdrew the last carburettors three years prior).

For the W140 S-Class in production this was limited to a formal re-badging, where attributes such as the fuel system, wheelbase and body style were abandoned. Extra information was sometimes affixed to the right-hand side of boot/trunk, denoting the diesel version (TURBODIESEL or later CDI), hybrid version (HYBRID), all-wheel-drive version (4MATIC), AMG or MAYBACH model. The second revision in 2015 allows the suffixes such as d (diesel), e (plug-in hybrid), and the h (mild hybrid) for several years before h was dropped. For 2018 model year, the model designation AMG and MAYBACH labels switched their position to the left.

The two door version was split off into its own CL-class in 1996 in an attempt to create two parallel triumvirates consisting of the S-Class sedans, SL-roadsters and SLK compact roadsters on one side, and the C-compact sedans, CL luxury coupes and CLK compact coupes/cabriolets, also released in 1996. However both the CL and CLK were respectively reverted into the S-Class and E-class in 2017 and 2009 respectively.

| Chassis | Type | Debut |
|---|---|---|
| W180 | "Ponton" | 1954 |
| W189 | "Adenauer" | 1957 |
| W111 | "Fintail" | 1959 |
| W112 | "Fintail" | 1961 |
| W108/W109 | n/a | 1965 |
| W116 | S-Class | 1972 |
| W126 | S-Class | 1979 |
| W140 | S-Class | 1991 |
| W220 | S-Class | 1999 |
| W221 | S-Class | 2006 |
| W222 | S-Class | 2014 |
| W223 | S-Class | 2021 |

== Predecessor models ==
=== "Ponton" (1954) ===
W180
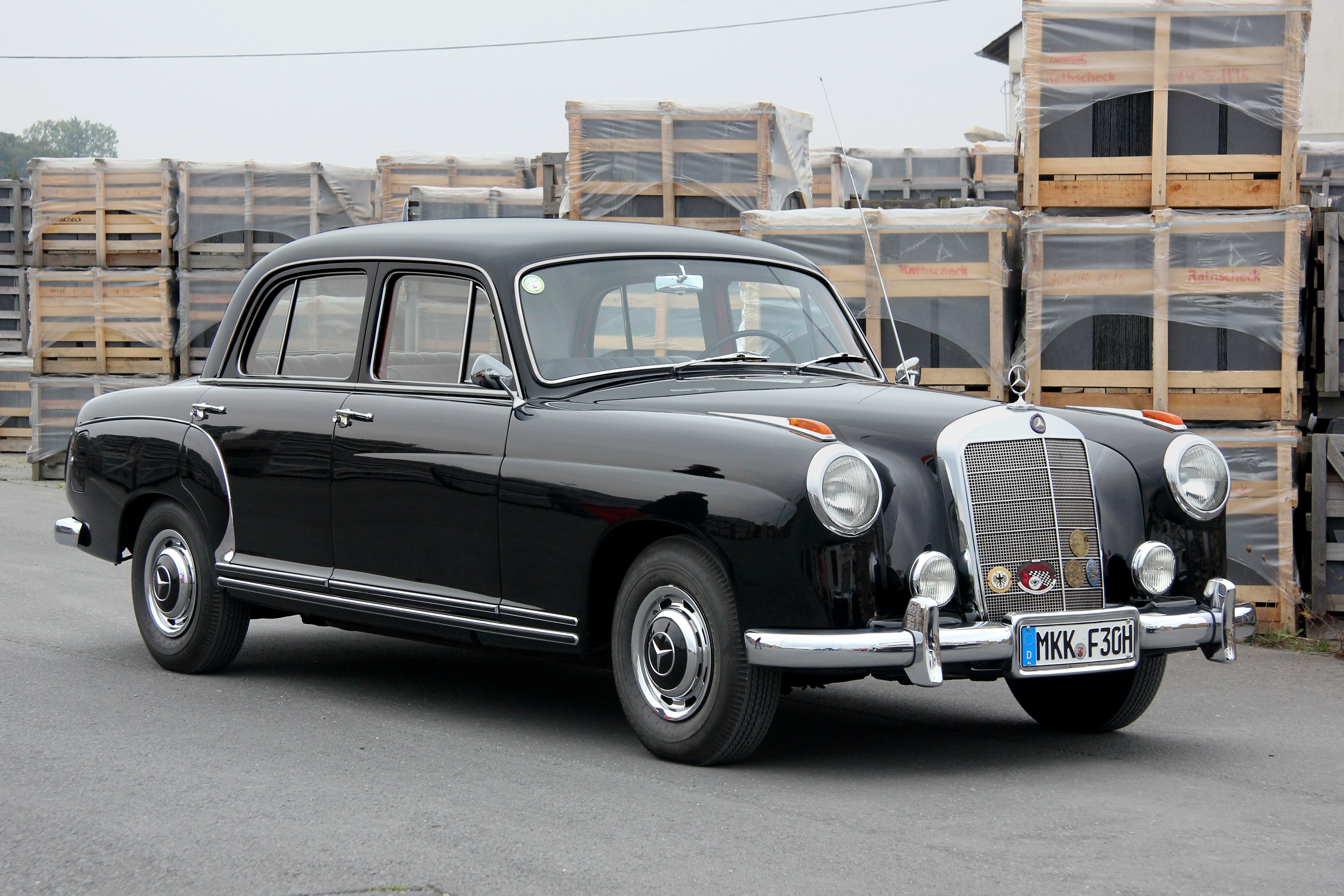
- Mercedes-Benz 220 (W180)

Overview
- Also called: 220a, 220S
- Production: 1954–1959 (W180)

Body and chassis
- Layout: FR layout

Powertrain
- Engine: 2.2L I6

The W180 line debuted in 1954, and is the first lineup of "Ponton" models retroactively associated with the Mercedes-Benz S-Class. The W180 featured six-cylinder sedan, coupé, and convertible models, and was produced until 1959. It featured the 220S models (sedan, coupé, and cabriolet) powered by a 2.2L straight-6, and came to ten. The "Ponton" designation referred to its unibody construction, with the era's rounded fenders a stylistic feature on the W180 model.

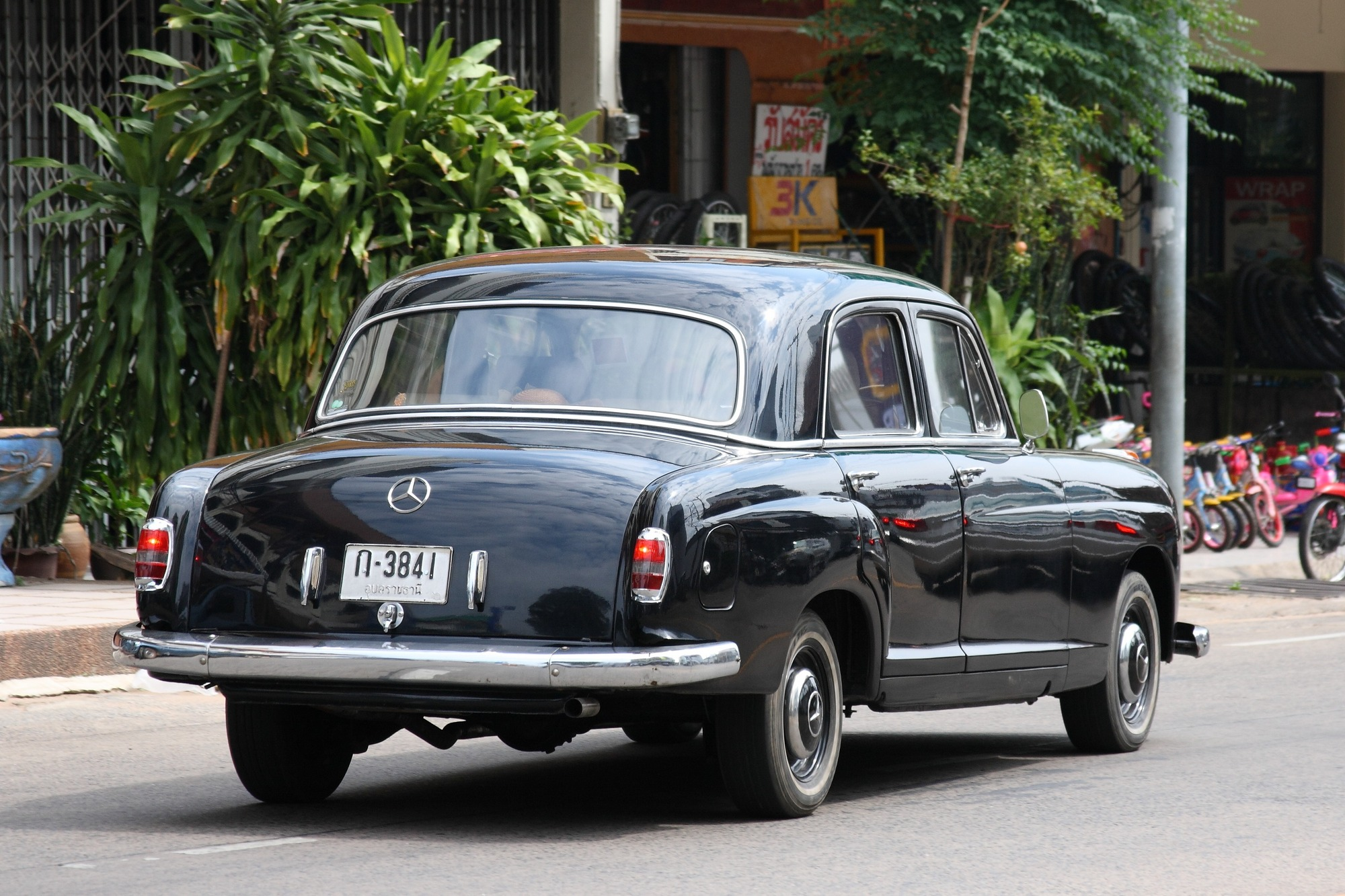
A 1950s W180 Ponton

The "Ponton" lineup included four- and six-cylinder models, but only the six-cylinder W180 line is considered part of the Mercedes-Benz S-Class chronology, as they were the most powerful "Ponton" versions available. The Big "Ponton" model was Mercedes' first without a conventional frame, using a unitized body/frame construction.

=== "Fintail" (1959) ===
W111, W112
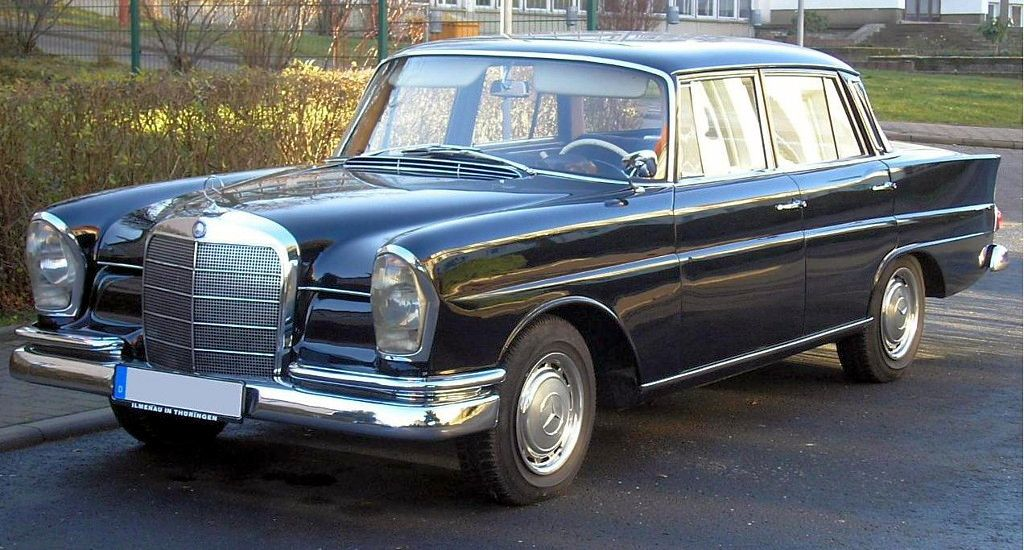

Overview
- Also called: 220, 220S, 220SE, 230S, 250SE, 280SE, 280SE 3.5
- Production: 1959–1968 (sedan); 1961–1971 (coupe and cabriolet)

Body and chassis
- Layout: FR layout

Powertrain
- Engine: 2.2 L I6; 2.3 L I6; 2.5 L I6; 2.8 L I6; 3.5 L V8

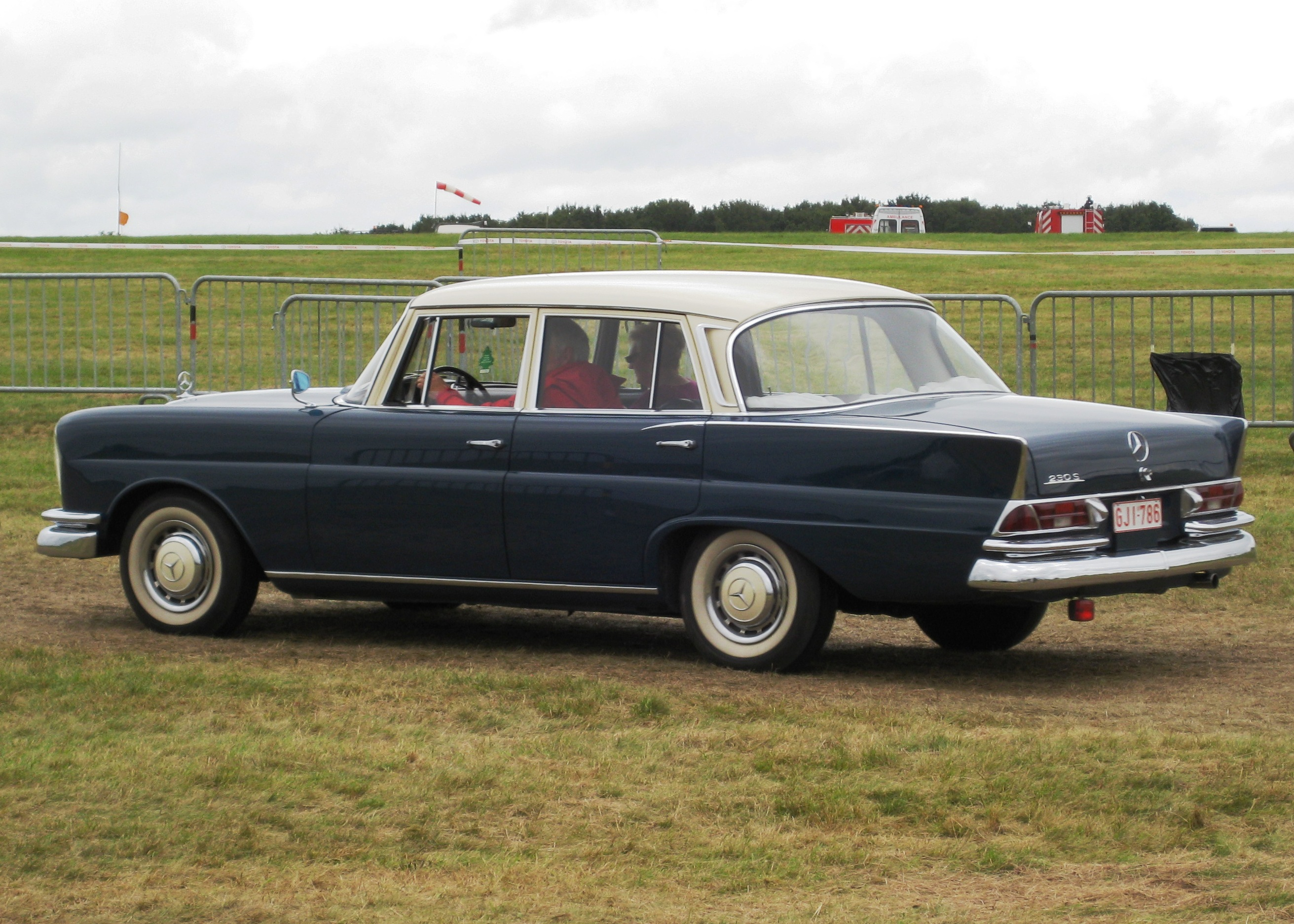
Mercedes-Benz 230S (Belgium)

Mercedes-Benz Fintail (German: Heckflosse) is an informal nickname given to Mercedes-Benz vehicles notable for the presence of tailfins. Though never officially designated as such — Mercedes-Benz claimed they were functional and designated them Peilstege, assisting to mark the end of the car in the rear-view mirror. The Fintail series replaced the Ponton series.

The exterior was designed for the European and North American markets. The W111 was a chassis code given to its top-range vehicles, including four-door sedans, produced from 1959 to 1968, and two-door coupes and cabriolets from 1961 to 1971. The W111, was initially attributed only to six-cylinder cars with 2.2-litre engines. The luxury version with big-block 3-litre engines were given the chassis code W112. The entry-level vehicles with four-cylinder engines were called W110. All three versions W110, W111, and W112, in both two- and four-door bodies, were based on the same unibody structure. Since the advent of the W112 series, the Mercedes-Benz S-Class has always included two wheelbase lengths, although not all wheelbases are sold in every country.

=== W108 · W109 (1965) ===
W108, W109
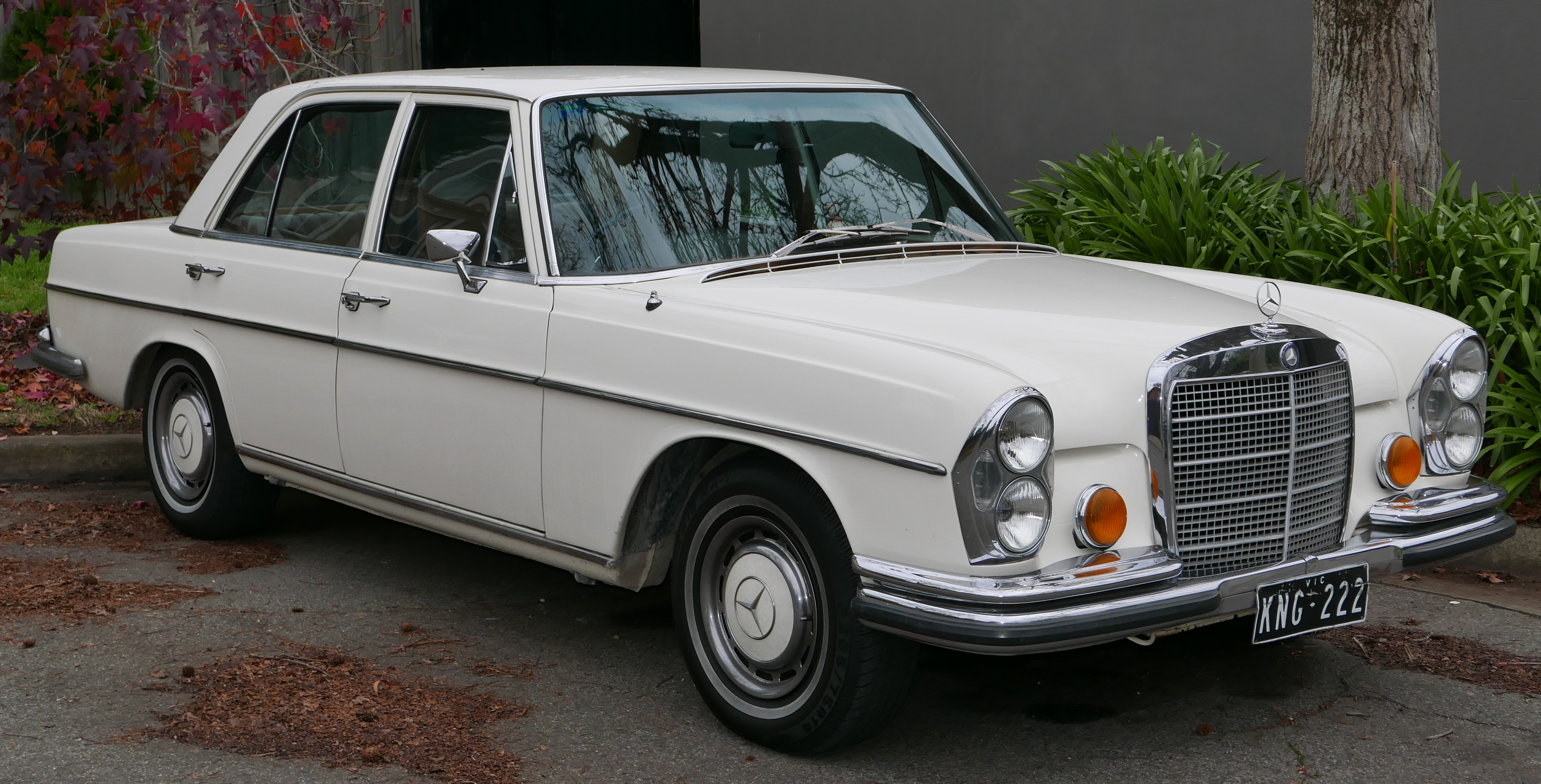

Overview
- Also called: 250S, 250SE, 280S, 280SE, 280SEL, 300SE, 300SEL, 280SE 3.5, 280SEL 3.5, 300SEL 3.5, 280SE 4.5, 280SEL 4.5, 300SEL 4.5, 300SEL 6.3
- Production: 1965–1972

Body and chassis
- Layout: FR layout

Powertrain
- Engine: 2.5 L I6; 2.8 L I6; 3.0L I6; 3.5 L V8; 4.5 L V8; 6.3 L V8

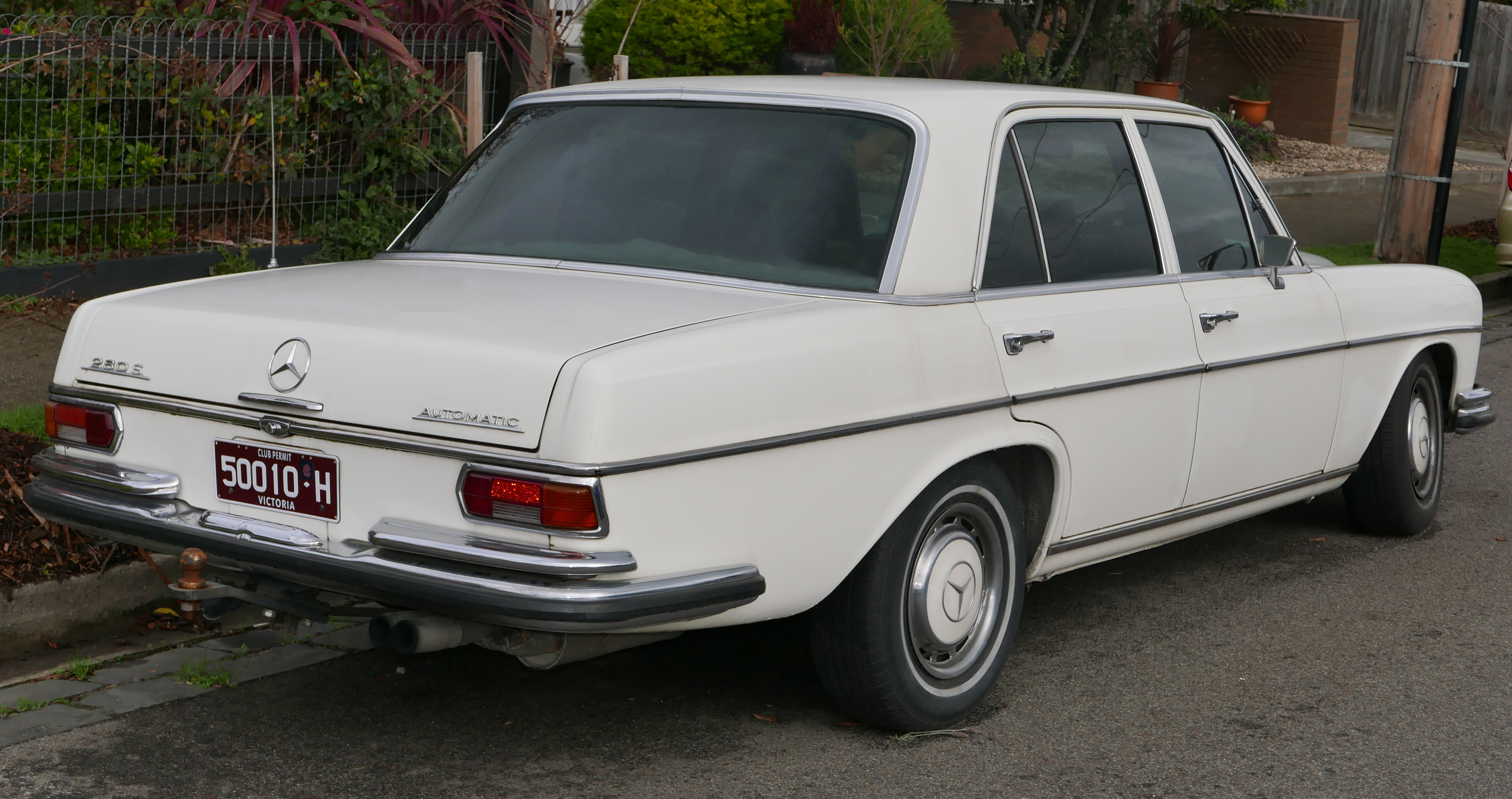
Mercedes-Benz 280 S

The updated and larger W108/W109 model lines were introduced in 1965. The squarish W108 line included the straight-six M129 engine powered 250S, 250SE, 280S 280SE and 280SEL. In 1968 the 300 SEL 6.3 borrowed the 6.3-litre V8 from the W100 600 Pullman to offer a truly high-performance luxury sedan.

During this period, the designation S for "special class" (German: "Sonderklasse) was used for standard carbureted short-wheelbase models; an E for "injection" (German: "Einspritzung"), was added to the 250SE, 280SE and 300SE. Long-wheelbase models gained an L for "long" (German: "lang"), reflecting an extra 10 centimetres (3.9 in) added in the rear passenger compartment.

The more powerful 300SE and 300SEL models were classified as the W109 chassis, with front and rear air suspension (rather than the coil spring based W108 rear suspension), and available burl walnut interior trim, automatic transmission, and power windows.

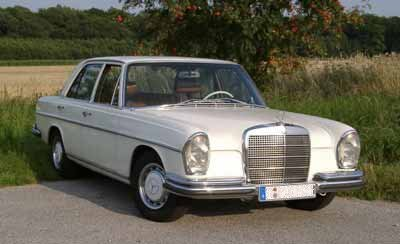
Late 1960s W108 line

In 1968, the W108 line dropped the 250SE in favor of the larger-engined 280S and 280SEL; the 250S remained as an entry model until 1969; the 300SE/SEL yielded their 3.0 litre inline-6 for the intermediate SL type (W113) 2.8 litre engine, and were later offered with a 3.5-litre V8 engine (in both the SE and SEL form, not in the U.S.) and 4.5-litre (U.S. only) and 6.3-litre V8 engines (in the SEL model only). The W108/109 lines, which eventually supplanted the W111 lines, were never available with four-cylinder engines.

== First generation (W116; 1972) ==
First generation
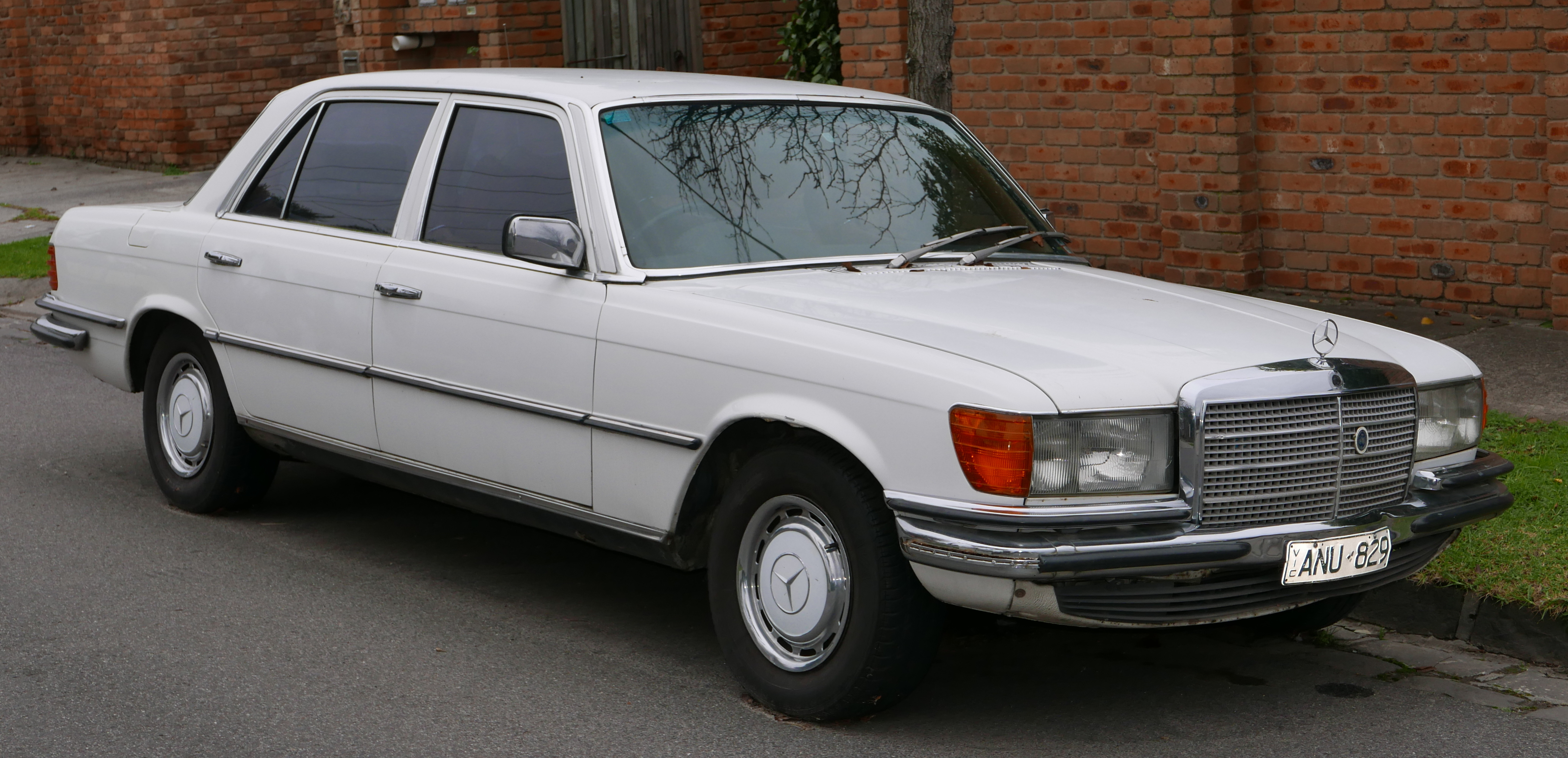
- Mercedes-Benz 280 SEL (W116)

Overview
- Model code: W116
- Production: 1972–1980

Body and chassis
- Layout: FR layout

Powertrain
- Engine: 2.8 L M110 I6; 3.5 L M116 V8; 4.5 L M117 V8; 6.8 L M100 V8; 3.0 L OM617 I5 turbodiesel
- Transmission: 3-speed automatic 4-speed automatic 5-speed manual 4-speed manual

In 1972, Mercedes-Benz introduced the W116 line, the first to be officially called the S-Class. Produced from 1972 through 1980, the W116 series featured four-wheel independent suspension and disc brakes. The 280, 350, and 450 (4.5L version) models featured SE and SEL versions. Production of the W116 totaled 473,035 units. This was a groundbreaking sedan for Mercedes-Benz, and for the first time in the company history, the car had an obvious, blatant and outward emphasis on safety placed above a pure styling viewpoint. The overall design incorporated numerous safety features developed from the "safety research vehicles" in the mid-to-late 1960s to the very early 1970s.

These safety features were all newly introduced passenger-car "firsts" on a production vehicle: padded door trim around the windows, heavily padded steering wheel (later to be replaced by an airbag with the Mercedes-Benz abbreviation of SRS standing for the English-language term Supplemental Restraint System), more comprehensive safety padding on the dashboard and around the interior, dual asymmetric windshield wipers, headrests with a center depression to locate the occupant's head in a more central position during a rear impact, a rain-water management system to improve visibility consisting of deep channels on both sides of the windshield and flowing into deeply channeled rain gutters, including similar designs on the side mirrors, rounded body shapes along the edges, such as the tops of the front fenders, etc., designed to ameliorate pedestrian injuries, ribbed rear taillamp lenses which would remain clearer of dirt on the recessed areas, an easy-to-access first aid kit stowed in a recessed compartment on the rear parcel shelf prominently labeled with the universally recognized "cross" symbol which represents "first aid", and several other subtle safety features related to both active and passive safety. The Mercedes-Benz S-Class is a classic chauffeur driven car, and has frequently been used as standard by car hire companies. It is comfortable and safe as well as elegant looking; ideal for drives across the countryside or high class transport on a night out.

The W116 models were large luxury sedans. The W116 was larger on the outside than the W108/W108/W109 series it replaced, but had similar interior capacity, as the additional bulk was driven by several new and aforementioned engineering developments on car safety and occupant protection in a crash. The W116 introduced other improved passive safety features into the vehicle design, including a strengthened vehicle occupant shell. It was one of the first cars to be available with ABS, a driver's airbag supplemental restraint system (but not available at the vehicle's initial launch). Also, the W116 was the first mass production passenger vehicle offered with a turbocharged diesel engine.

The 450SE, then the most powerful model in the W116 lineup, was awarded European Car of the Year in 1974. At the New England Auto Show in 1972 held in the fall season in Boston, the Monroney Label of a 1973 450SE was right at $13,000. 1973 was the first model year of the W116 for the US market. Starting in 1975, the W116 was upgraded with a new fuel injection system to comply with revised exhaust emission standards in European markets. A slight power reduction was a result of this update, but in 1978, a series of further engine upgrades restored original performance levels under the new fuel injection systems. Between 1973 and 1977, 997 Special Edition W116 models were made on order by Mercedes. These cars incorporated stronger body paneling and suspension and was 50 kg heavier than its normal counterpart.

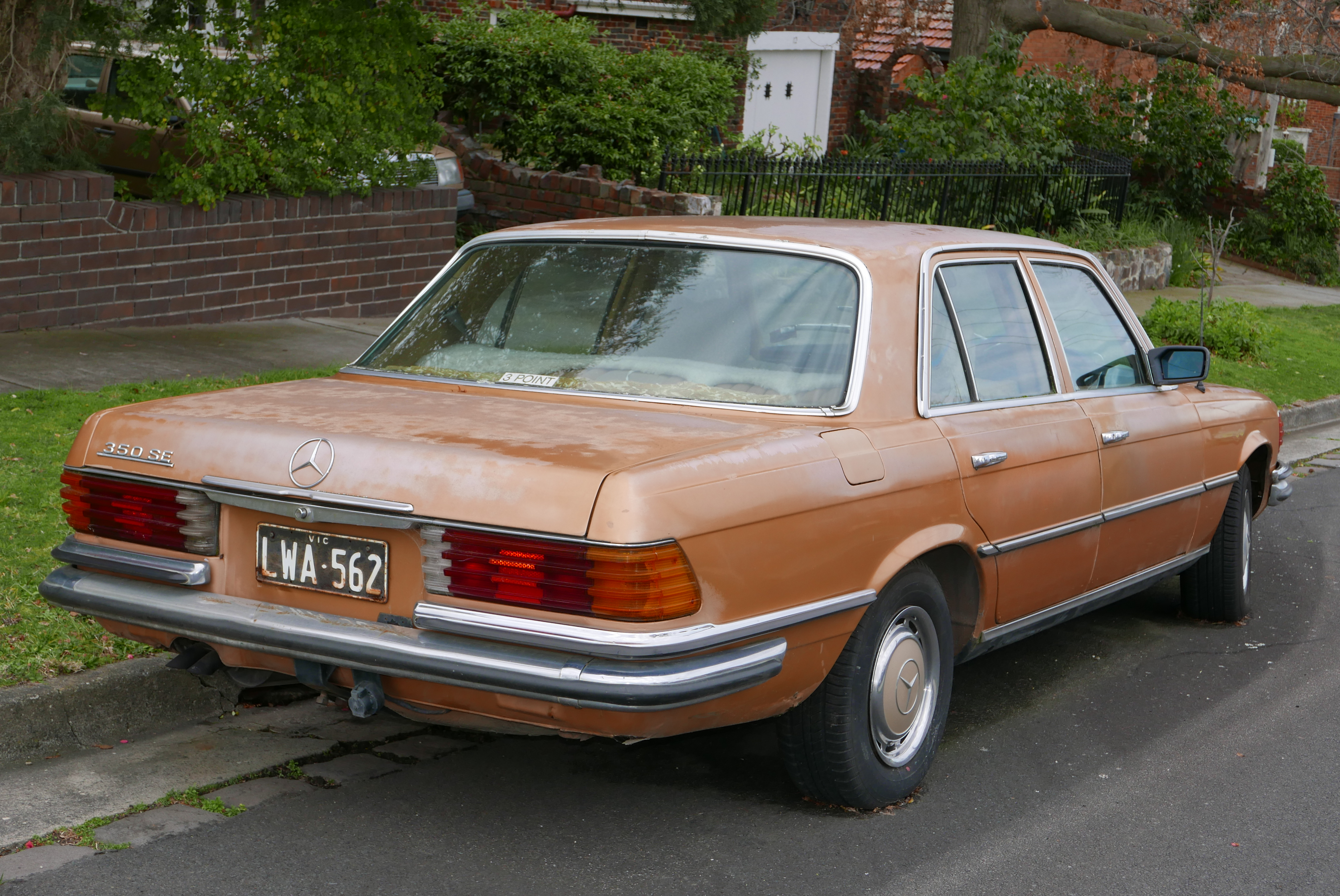
Large boxy rear lights of the 1970s W116, the first official "S-Class"

=== Engines ===
With the W116 models, the V8-engines of the 350/450 SE/SEL models were now regular options. Due to the oil crisis, fuel efficiency was a major concern for engineers, yet they still added the high-performance, limited-production 450 SEL 6.9. This 8-cylinder model, affectionately referred to as simply "the 6.9", boasted the largest engine installed in a postwar Mercedes-Benz up to that time. Every 450 SEL 6.9 featured a self-leveling hydropneumatic suspension, and offered the ABS anti-lock braking system as an option from 1978 onwards. In the United States and Canada only, Mercedes-Benz introduced the economical but powerful 3.0-litre 5-cylinder turbo-diesel OM 617 A producing 85 kW (116 PS; 114 bhp) in 1978, sold as the 300SD.

== Second generation (W126/C126; 1979) ==
Second generation
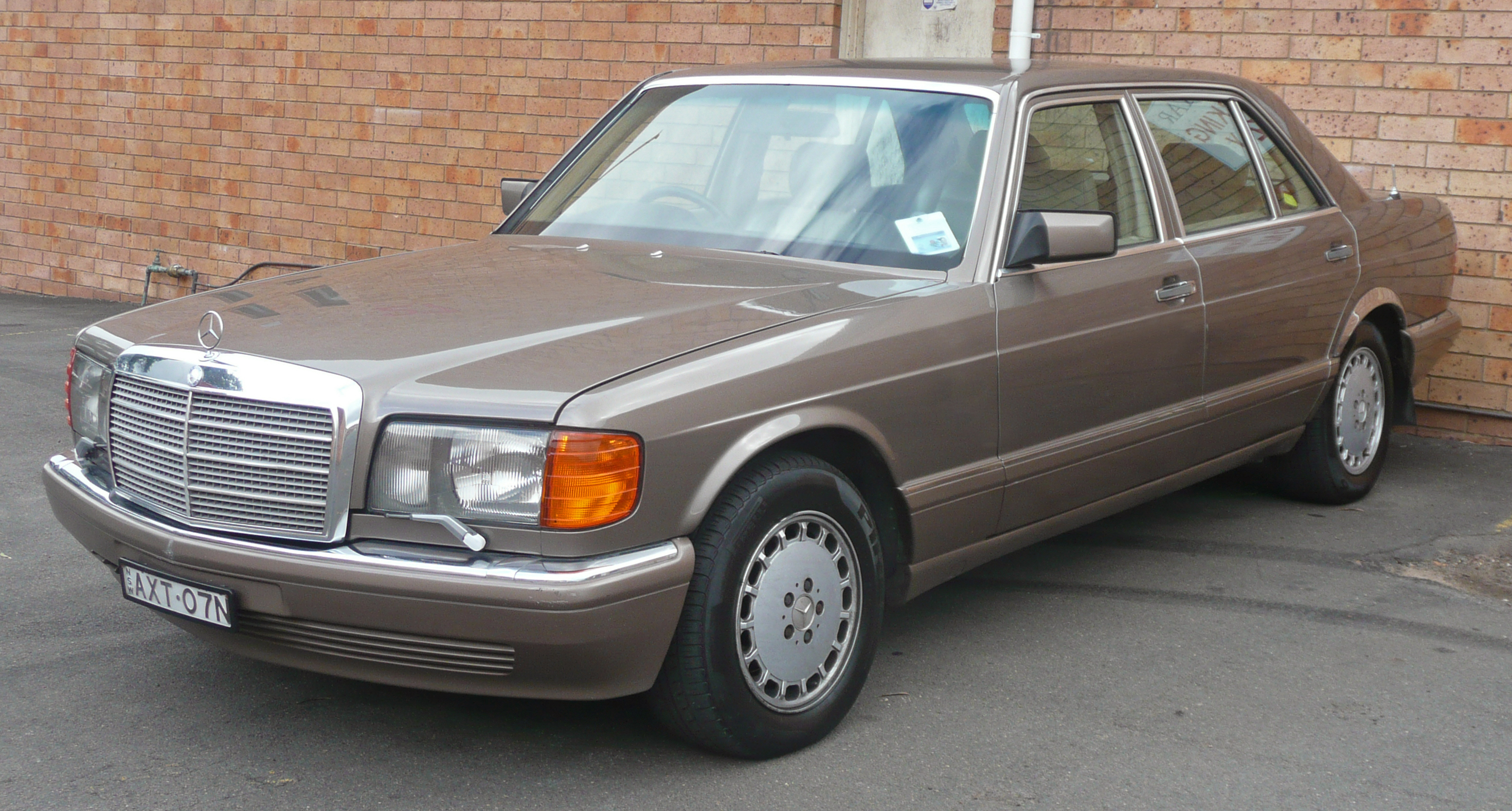

Overview
- Model code: W126 (Sedan); C126 (Coupé)
- Production: December 1979 – April 1992

Body and chassis
- Layout: FR layout

Powertrain
- Engine: 2.6 L I6; 2.8 L I6; 3.0 L I6; 3.8 L V8; 4.2 L V8; 5.0 L V8; 5.6 L V8; 3.0 L 5-cylinder turbodiesel 3.0 L 6-cylinder turbodiesel 3.5 L 6-cylinder turbodiesel
- Transmission: 4-speed automatic 5-speed manual

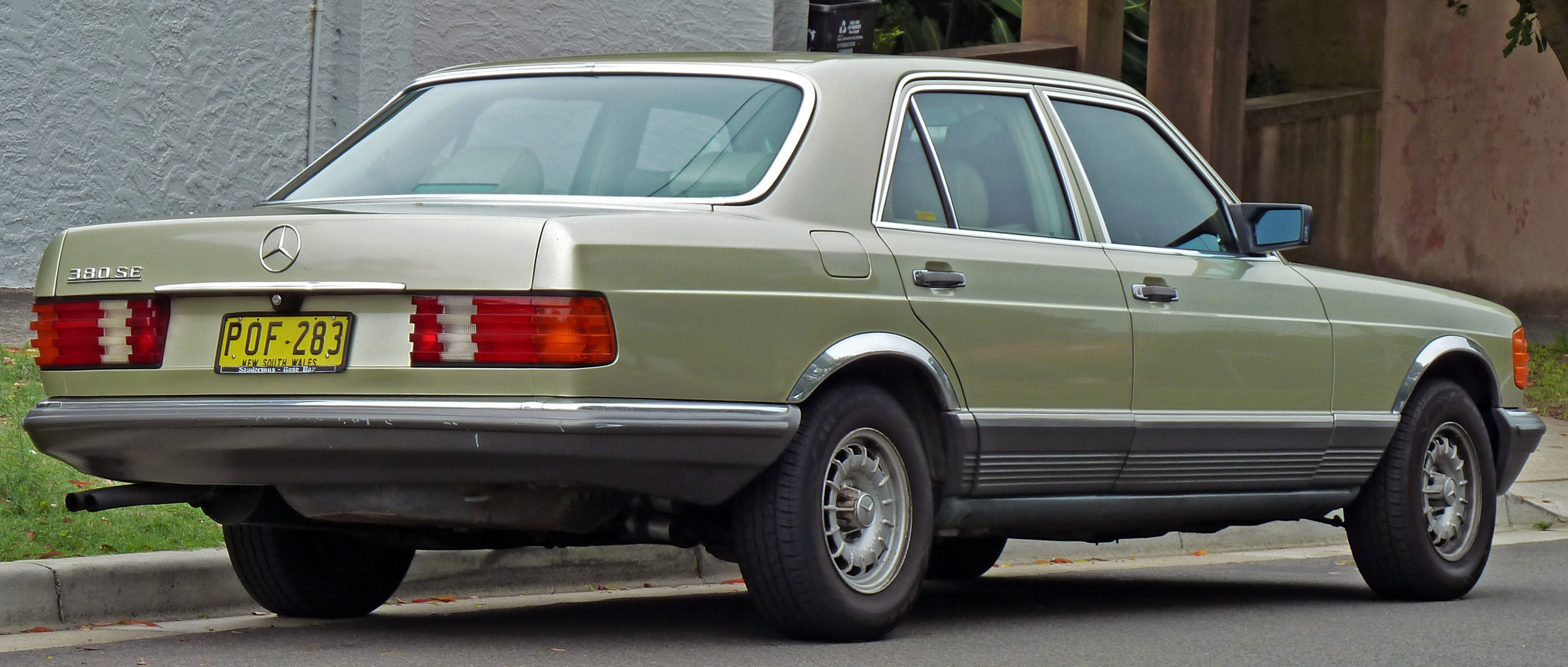
Mercedes-Benz 380 SE short wheelbase

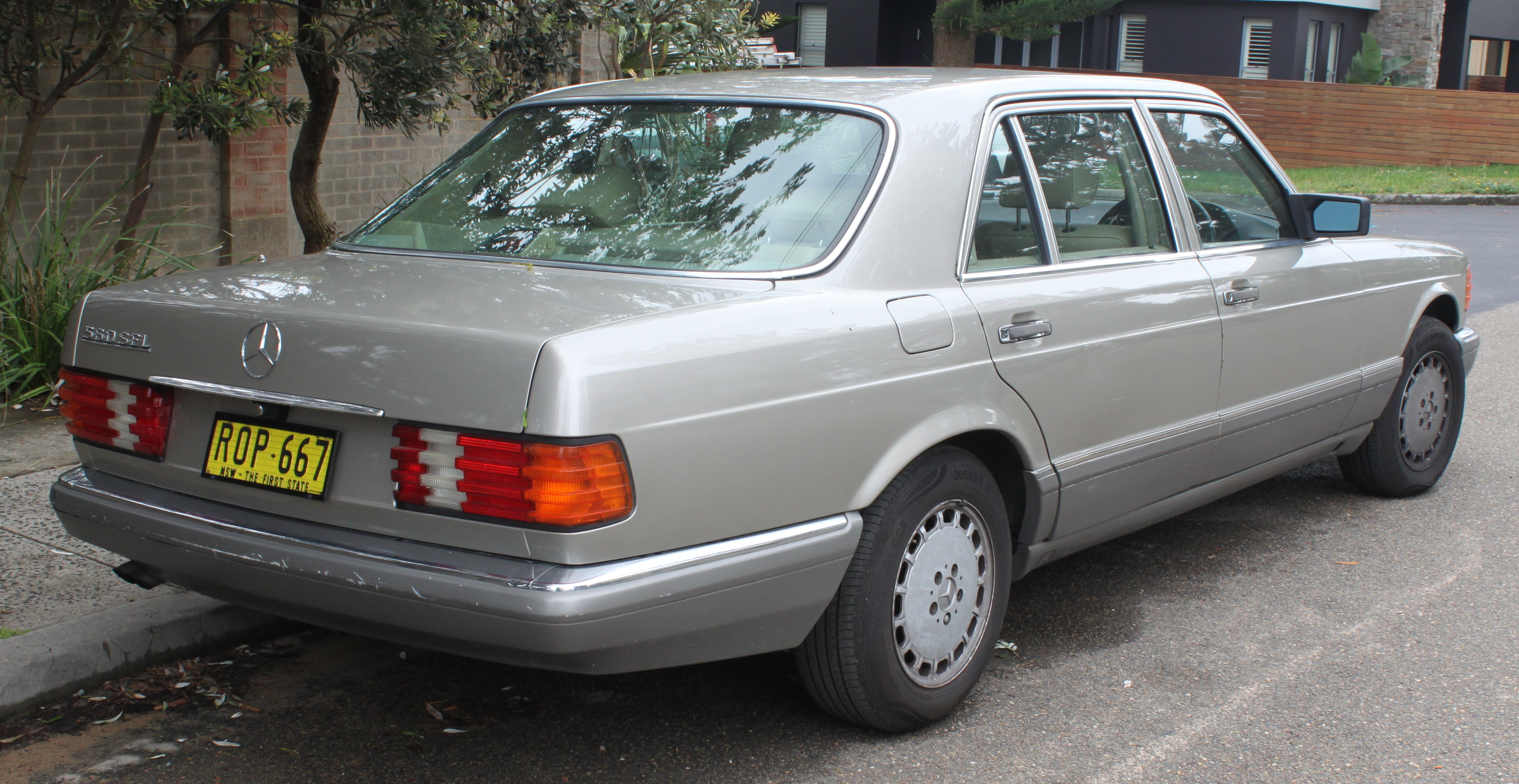
Mercedes-Benz 560 SEL long wheelbase

The W126 series premiered in September 1979, launching in March 1980 as a 1980 model and late 1980 as a 1981 model in the US and Australia replacing the W116 line. The W126 line featured improved aerodynamics and enlarged aluminum engine blocks. In Australia in 1981, the W126 S-Class won Wheels magazine's Car of the Year award. The W126 was manufactured from 1979 through 1991 with a mid-cycle update. Coupé models based on the S-Class were reintroduced with the W126 (380/500 SEC). Total sales of the W126 S-Class sedans reached 818,036 units, with an additional 74,060 coupes sold.

In December 1980, the W126 introduced a driver side airbag, as patented by Mercedes-Benz in 1971, as well as passenger side airbags (in 1988), seat-belt pretensioners, and traction control. It was the first production car to feature an airbag standard, and as late as 1991 there were only a few other manufacturers in Europe who offered an airbag. The interior featured additional courtesy and reading lamps, along with heated seats and a more advanced climate control system. A four-speed automatic transmission was standard.

Although the top of range Mercedes-Benz 450SEL 6.9 of the previous generation was not directly replaced, the W126 carried forward the hydropneumatic suspension of the 6.9 as an option on the 500SEL. A new cruise control system was offered as well. Succeeding the roadster based coupes, the W126 introduced a two-door variant, the SEC coupé. The W126 S-Class received a mid-cycle update in 1985 that included both exterior modifications and engine upgrades.

=== Engines ===
The power plants on the W126 S-Class included straight-6 and V8 engines. Most sales came from the diesel model in Europe and straight-six models in the United States, although the V8 models were praised by contemporary journalists. The US initially received only the smaller of the two V8 engines, the 3.8 litre, which turned out to be a disaster, both due to timing chain repair issues, and to being severely underpowered, with 0-60 mph (97 km/h) acceleration in a leisurely 11 seconds and a modest top speed of 117 mph (188 km/h). The 5.0 litre engine was far more capable, with 0-60 mph (97 km/h) acceleration in 7.3 seconds and a top speed of 138 mph (222 km/h). During the W126 mid-cycle update in 1986, both the straight-6 and V8 engines were upgraded in several models to different displacement levels (six-cylinder upgraded from 2.8 L to 3.0 L, eight-cylinder upgraded from 3.8 L to 4.2 L, and 5.0 L to 5.6 L).

== Third generation (W140/C140; 1991) ==
Third generation
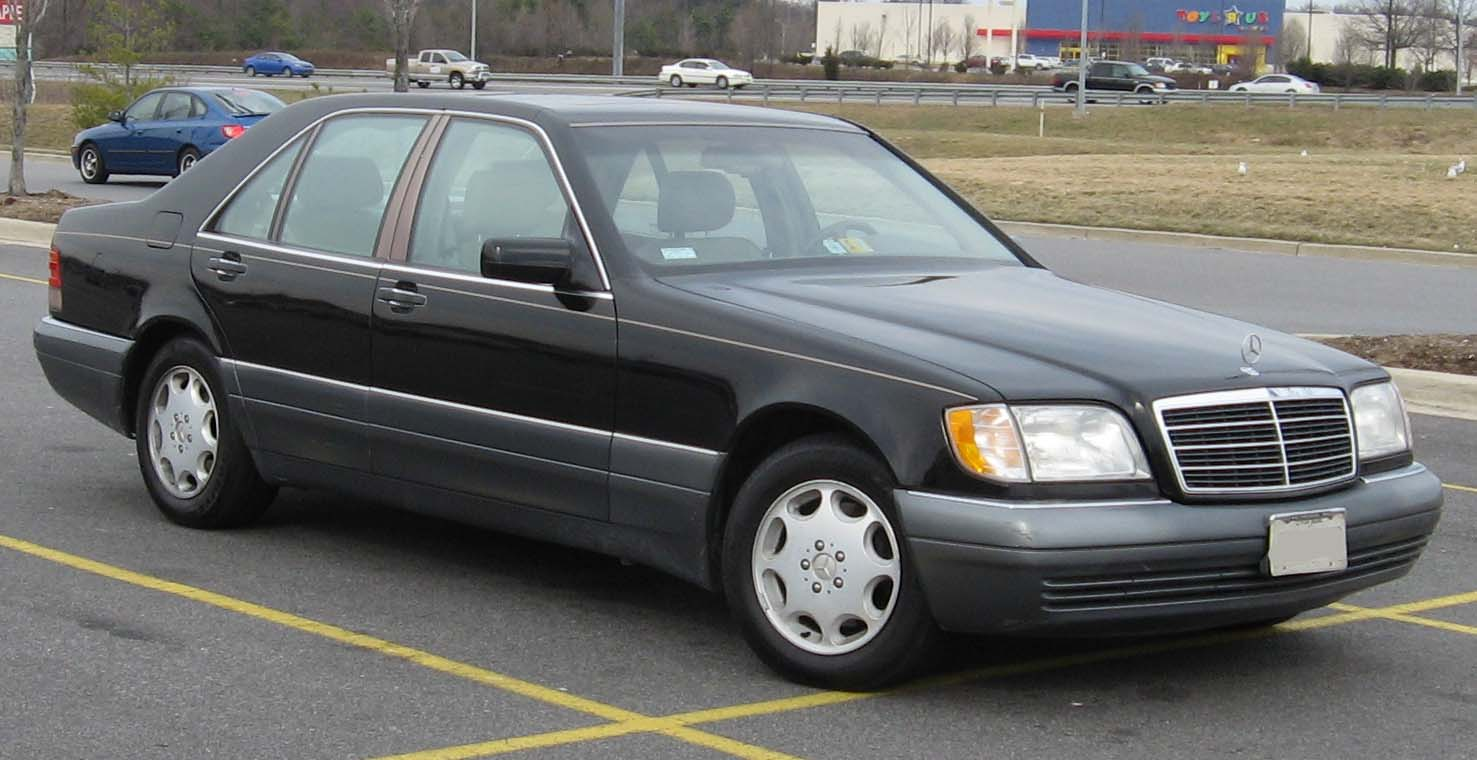

Overview
- Model code: W140 (Sedan); C140 (Coupé)
- Production: April 1991 – September 1999

Body and chassis
- Layout: FR layout

Powertrain
- Engine: 2.8 L 145 kW (197 PS; 194 bhp) I6; 3.2 L 170 kW (231 PS; 228 bhp) I6; 4.2 L 205 kW (279 PS; 275 bhp) V8; 5.0 L 240 kW (326 PS; 322 bhp) V8; 6.0 L 300 kW (408 PS; 402 bhp) V12 M120 (1991–1993); 6.0 L 290 kW (394 PS; 389 bhp) V12 M120 (1993–1998); 3.0 L Turbodiesel 130 kW (177 PS; 175 bhp) I6; 3.5 L Turbodiesel 110 kW (150 PS; 150 bhp) I6
- Transmission: 4-speed automatic 5-speed automatic 5-speed manual

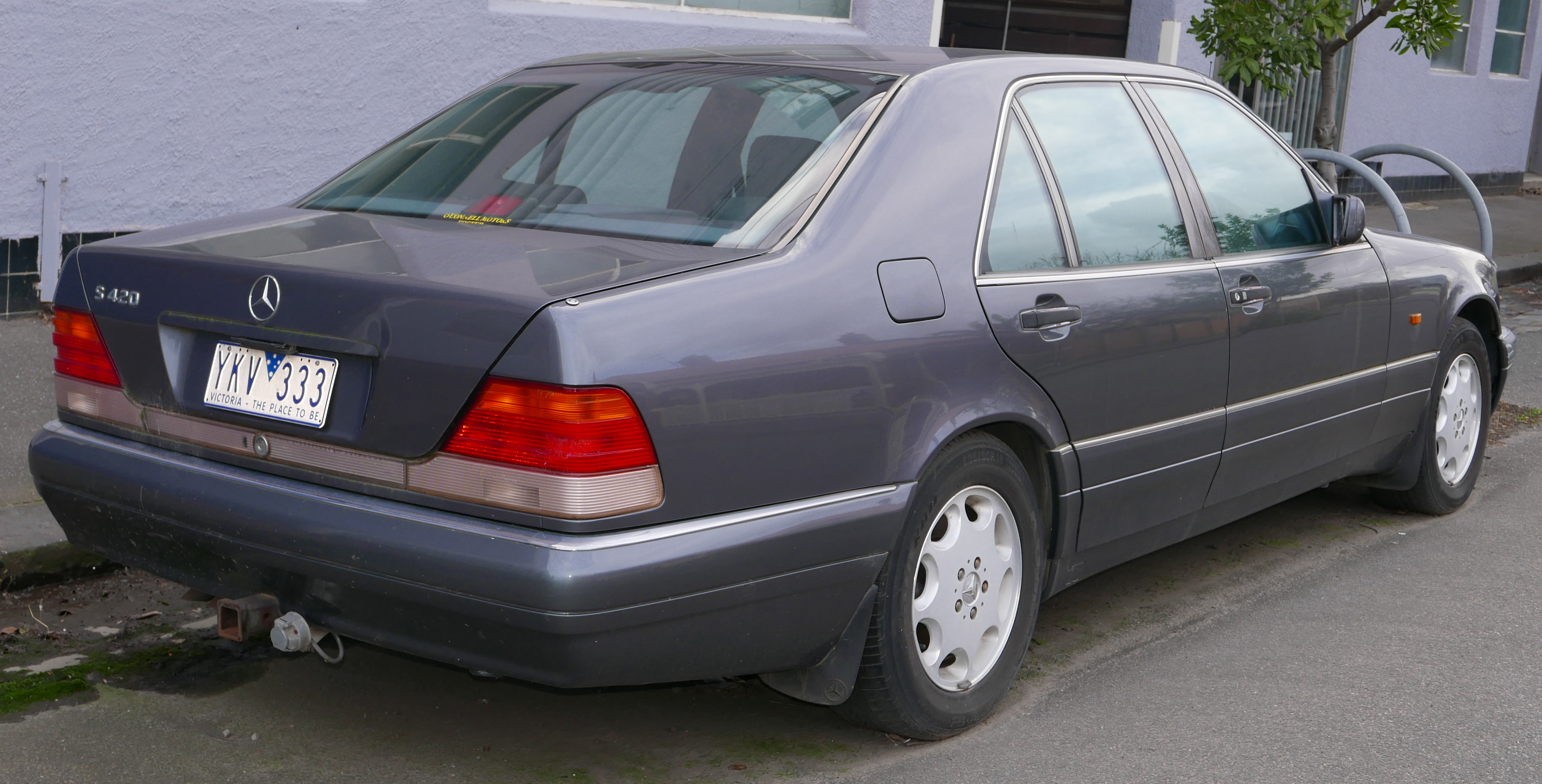
Mercedes-Benz S 420 short wheelbase

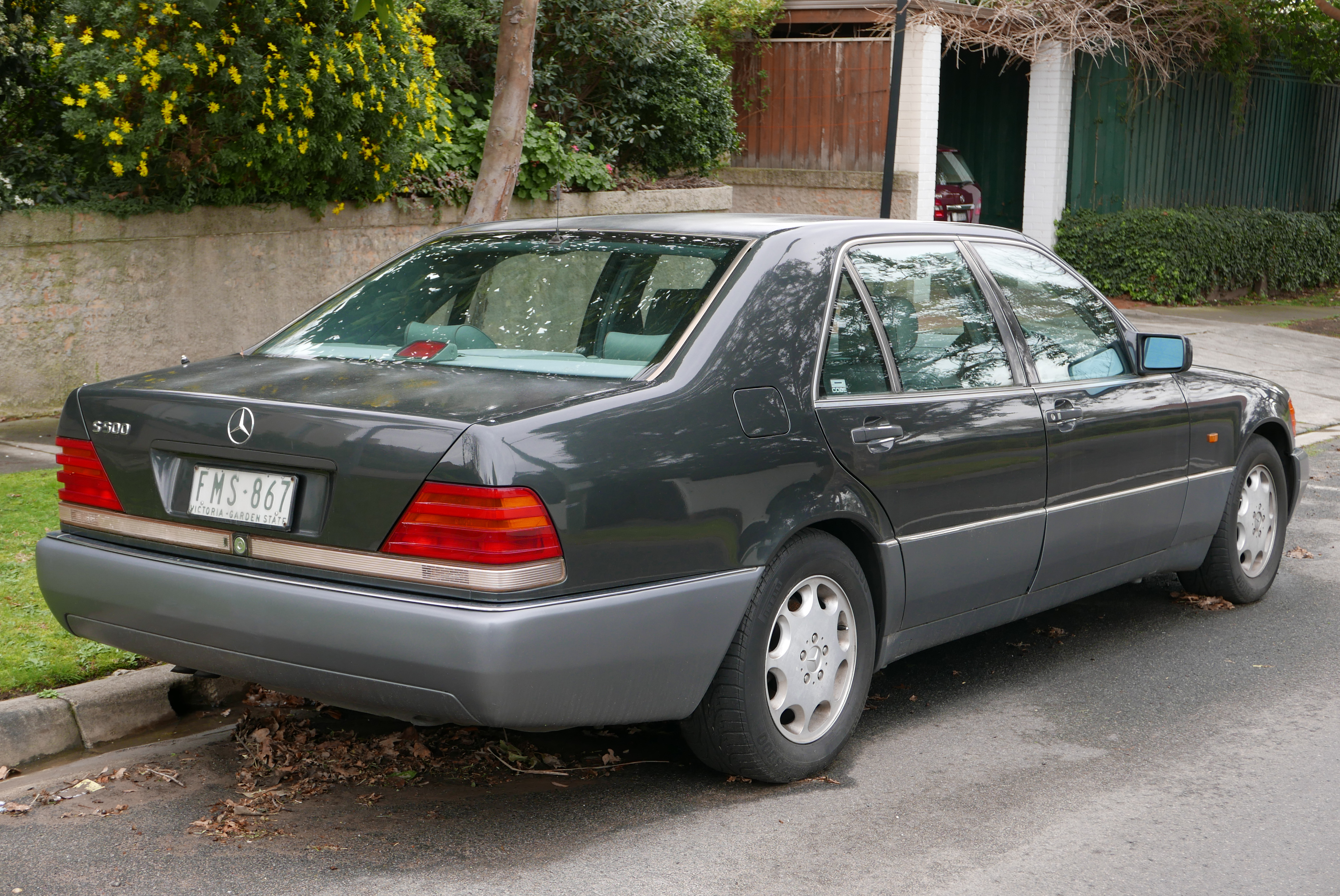
Mercedes-Benz S 500 long wheelbase

In 1991, the W140 series replaced the W126 line with the first production model assembled in April of that year. The W140 grew in proportions and featured two wheelbase lengths and a shorter-wheelbase W140 coupé. Production totalled 432,732 units.

The W140 cost 25% more than the W126 that it replaced and featured double-pane window glazing, self-closing boot lid and doors, electric windows with a jam-protection feature (lowering when encountering an obstruction), rear-parking markers in the US (which appeared on the rear wings when in reverse), and a heating system which emitted warm air while residual energy was available after the engine was turned off.

In 1993, Mercedes-Benz model nomenclature was rationalized, with the SE/SEL/SEC cars becoming the S-Class and alphanumerical designations inverted (e.g. both the 500SE and 500SEL became S500 regardless of wheelbase length). In 1995, the W140 received a minor face lift featuring clear turn signal indicator lenses on the front and rear as well as headlamps fitted with separate low- and high-beam reflectors for the US market. Following the mid-year face lift, the W140 coupe and sedan (Saloon) featured Electronic Stability Control. The W140 is heavily referred to or nicknamed as the "虎头奔" in China and the Mercedes "Shabah/شبح" (Meaning "ghost" when translated) in many Middle Eastern countries.

== Fourth generation (W220; 1998) ==
Fourth generation
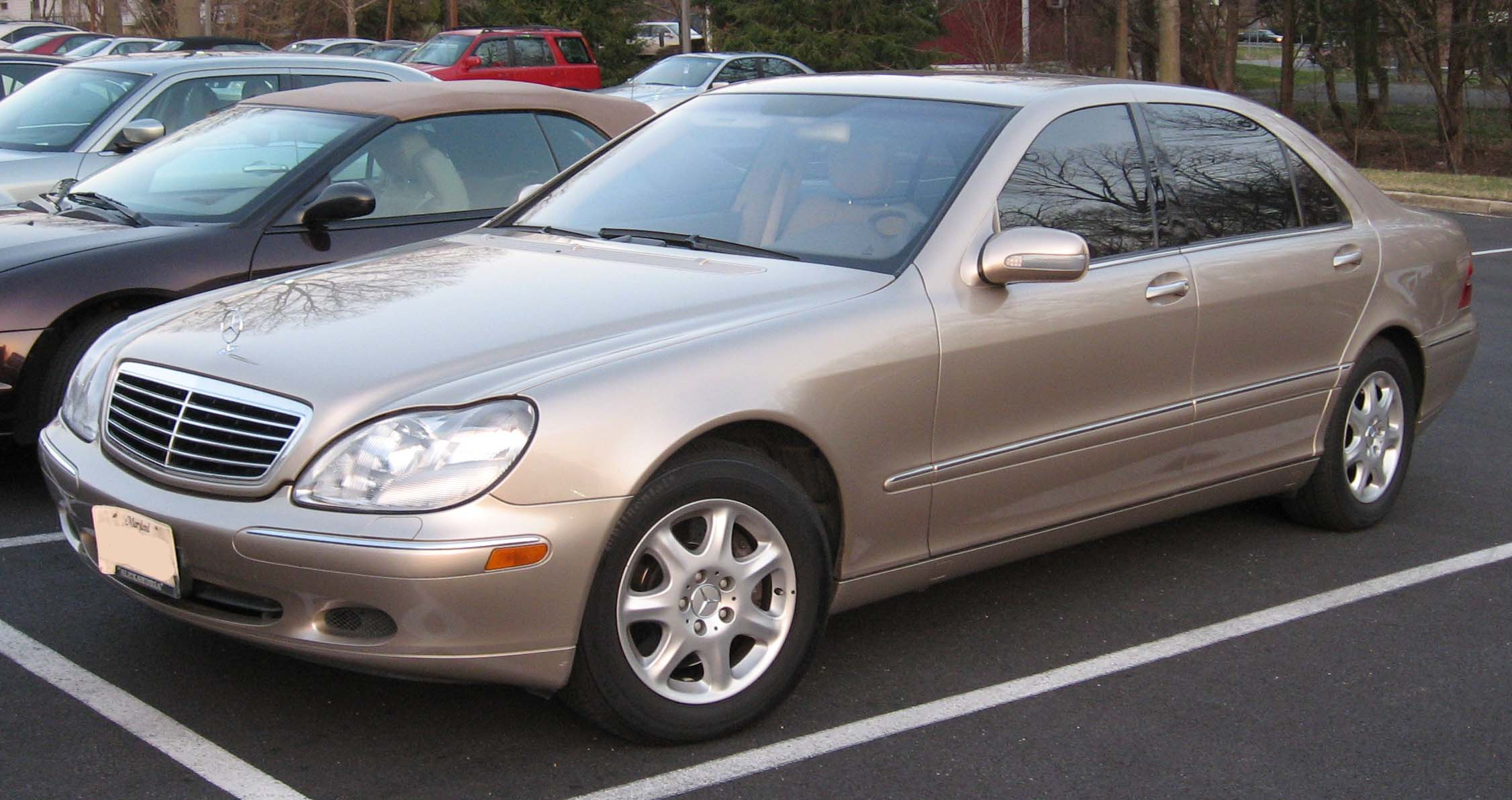

Overview
- Model code: W220
- Production: September 1998 – July 2005

Body and chassis
- Layout: Front engine, rear-wheel drive or four-wheel drive

Powertrain
- Engine: 2.8 L 150 kW (204 PS; 201 bhp) V6; 3.2 L 165 kW (224 PS; 221 bhp) V6; 3.2 L 145 kW (197 PS; 194 bhp) I6 diesel 3.7 L 180 kW (245 PS; 242 bhp) V6; 4.0 L 180 kW (250 PS; 250 bhp) V8 diesel 4.0 L 190 kW (260 PS; 260 bhp) V8 diesel 4.3 L 205 kW (279 PS; 275 bhp) V8; 5.0 L 225 kW (306 PS; 302 bhp) V8; 5.4 L 370 kW (500 PS; 490 bhp) V8; 5.8 L 270 kW (367 PS; 362 bhp) V12; 5.5 L 370 kW (500 PS; 490 bhp) V12; 6.3 L 330 kW (450 PS; 440 bhp) V12; 6.0 L 450 kW (612 PS; 604 bhp) V12
- Transmission: 5-speed automatic and 7-speed automatic (7G-Tronic)

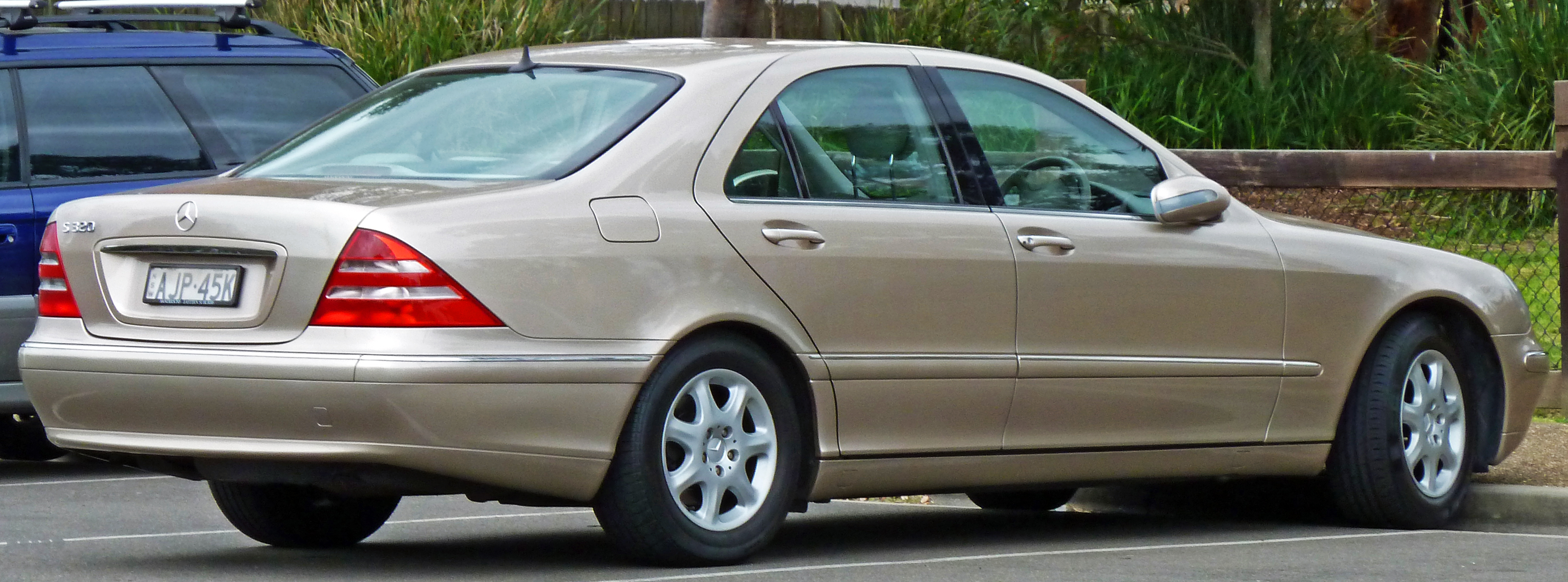
Mercedes-Benz S 320 short wheelbase (Australia)

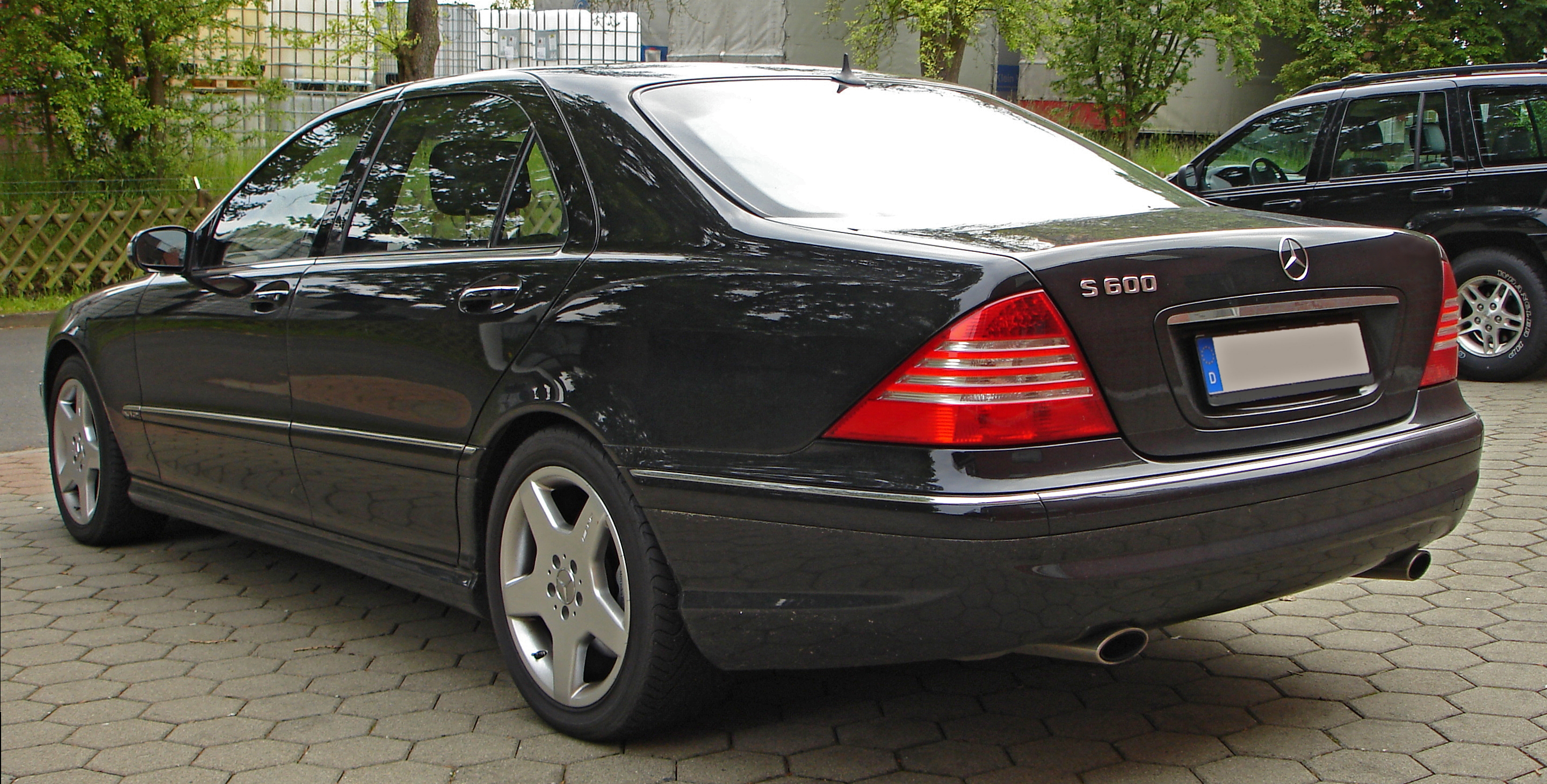
Mercedes-Benz S 600 long wheelbase (Europe)

Mercedes-Benz presented the W220 in July 1998, marketed as a sedan, only. Despite being smaller than the previous generation, the W220 offered more interior space. Production of the W220 totaled 485,000 units.

The W220 introduced air suspension, marketed as Airmatic, as well as a navigation system with center console-mounted screen display, along with its input control system, marketed as COMAND. Other options included keyless entry and ignition, a radar-controlled cruise control system marketed as Distronic and a cylinder shut-off system marketed as Active Cylinder Control. The all-wheel drive system was introduced to the North America market S-Class for 2003, and marketed as 4MATIC.

Consumer Reports classified the W220 model's reliability as "poor," its lowest rating, and called it one of the "least reliable luxury cars;" Edmunds gave the S-Class a 5 out of 5 reliability rating; and MSN Autos gave a rating of 9.0 out of 10. By March 2011, Consumer Reports revised its reliability ratings for the 2001 and 2002 S-Class to "average". Forbes described the W220 S500 as "built remarkably well." Early W220s in 1999 were recalled for issues with the trunk spring and the hydraulic fuel line; there were no recalls for the 2005 or 2006 model years.

In 2002, Mercedes-Benz introduced the world's first preemptive safety system on the W220 with a system marketed as Pre-Safe. The W220 received an exterior refresh with updates to the front fascia. The grille angle was adjusted to a slightly more upright position, and the xenon-discharge headlamps were given a new transparent housing, replacing the earlier opaque versions. The front bumper's lower air intakes were also restyled. In 2005, the S-Class was the first vehicle to receive a TÜV Institute environmental certificate from the German Commission on Technical Compliance for environmentally friendly components.

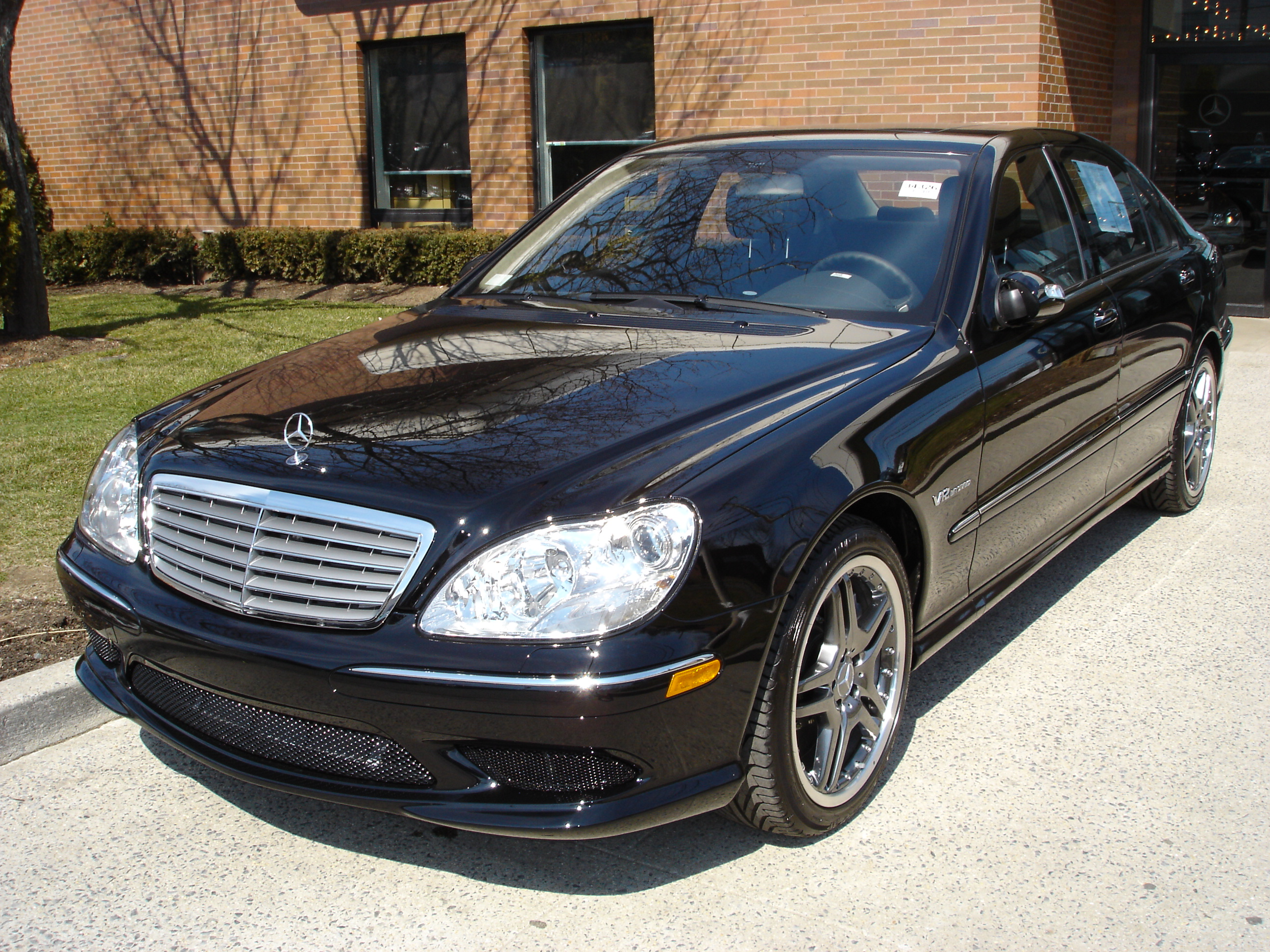
Introduced in 2003, the S 65 AMG offered the most powerful engine ever available in the S-Class.

=== Engines ===
The W220 was available with more engine options than the W126 or W140. The range started with smaller 2.8 (Singapore) then 3.2L 165 kW (224 PS; 221 bhp) V6 motor, which was superseded by an enlarged 3.7 L 180 kW (245 PS; 242 bhp) V6 in the S350. The S430 was powered by a 4.3 L 205 kW (279 PS; 275 bhp) V8 and the S500 was powered by a 5.0 L 225 kW (306 PS; 302 bhp) V8. The S55 AMG was outfitted with a supercharged 5.4 L 368 kW (500 PS; 493 bhp) V8 motor, the S55 AMG 2000/2001 was outfitted with the naturally aspirated 5.4 L 265 kilowatts (360 PS; 355 bhp) V8 motor. The S600 was outfitted with a 5.5 L 368 kW (500 PS; 493 bhp) M275 V12 biturbo engine, the S600 2000/2001 was outfitted with the naturally aspirated M137 5.8 L 270 kW (367 PS; 362 bhp) V12 engine.

In 2001, Mercedes produced a very rare S 63 AMG with a 5 speed automatic transmission and a modified version of the M137 V12 engine (displacement went up from 5.8 to 6.3 litres, 6258 cc) making 327 kW (444 PS; 438 bhp) at 5,500 RPM, and 620 N⋅m (457 lb⋅ft) of torque at 4000 RPM. 70 examples were manufactured and marketed in Europe and Asia.

In 2003, Mercedes debuted the S 65 AMG, powered by a bi-turbocharged 6.0 L (5,980 cc) M275 AMG V12 engine and a 5 speed automatic transmission, it produced 450 kW (612 PS; 604 bhp) at 5100 RPM, and 999 N⋅m (737 lb⋅ft) of torque at 4000 RPM. Acceleration from 0 to 100 km/h (62 mph) was officially rated at 4.4 seconds (0 to 60 mph (97 km/h) in 4.2 seconds), the car was limited to 250 km/h (155 mph).

== Fifth generation (W221/C216; 2005) ==
Fifth generation
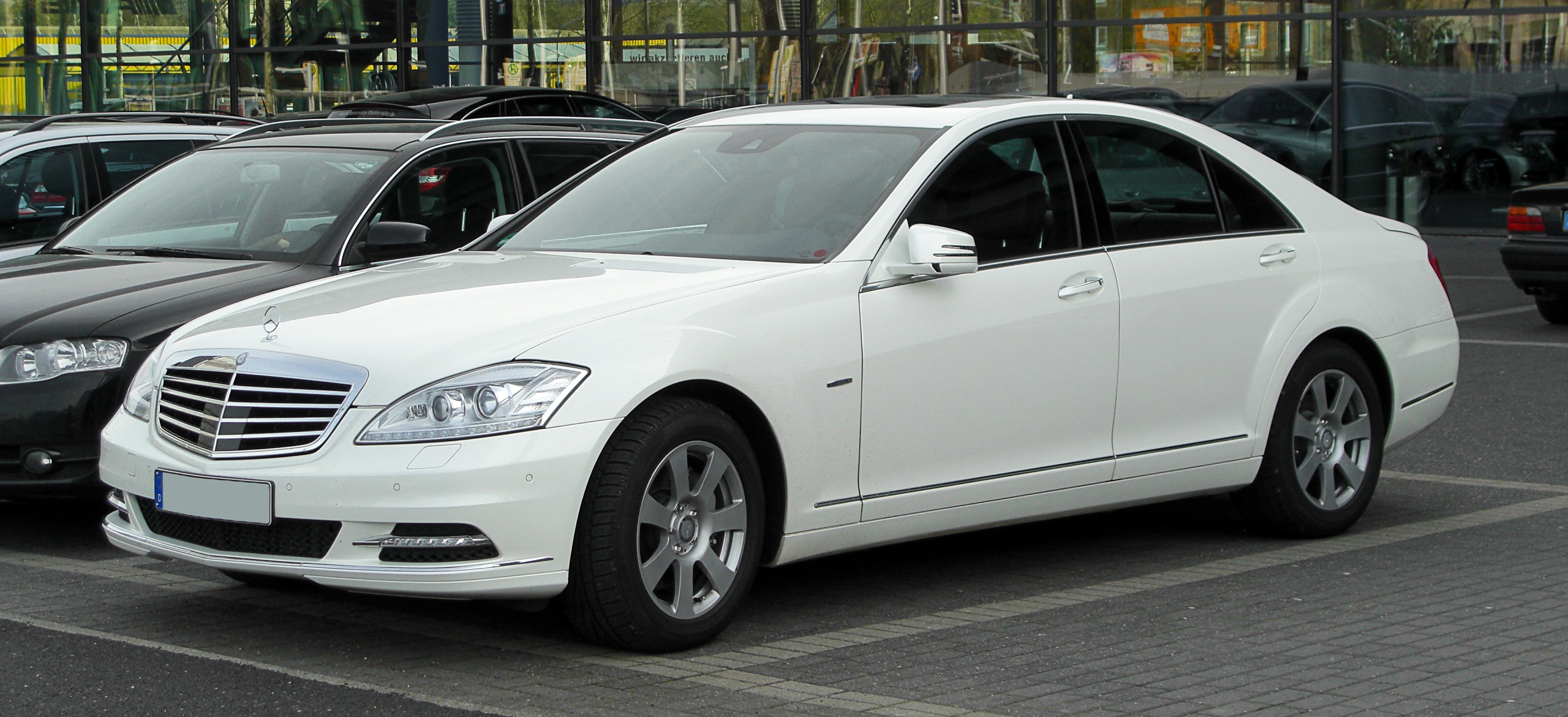

Overview
- Model code: W221 (Sedan); C216 (Coupé)
- Production: July 2005 – June 2013
- Model years: 2006–2013 (Worldwide); 2007–2013 (North America)
- Designer: Gorden Wagener (2001)

Body and chassis
- Layout: Front engine, rear-wheel drive or four-wheel drive
- Related: Mercedes-Benz CL-Class

Powertrain
- Engine: 2.1 L diesel 150 kW (204 PS; 201 bhp) I4 3.0 L diesel 190 kW (259 PS; 255 bhp) V6; 3.5 L 225 kW (306 PS; 302 bhp) V6; 3.5 L hybrid 220 kW (299 PS; 295 bhp) V6; 4.0 L diesel 236 kW (320 PS; 316 bhp) V8; 4.7 L 250 kW (340 PS; 335 bhp) V8; 4.7 L 320 kW (435 PS; 429 bhp) V8; 5.5 L 285 kW (387 PS; 382 bhp) V8; 5.5 L 380 kW (516 PS; 509 bhp) V12; 5.5 L AMG 400 kW (543 PS; 536 bhp) V8; 6.0 L AMG 463 kW (630 PS; 621 bhp) V12 6.2 L AMG 386 kW (525 PS; 518 bhp) V8
- Transmission: 7-speed (5-speed on S65 & S600) automatic

Dimensions
- Wheelbase: SWB: 3,035 mm (119.5 in); LWB: 3,165 mm (124.6 in)

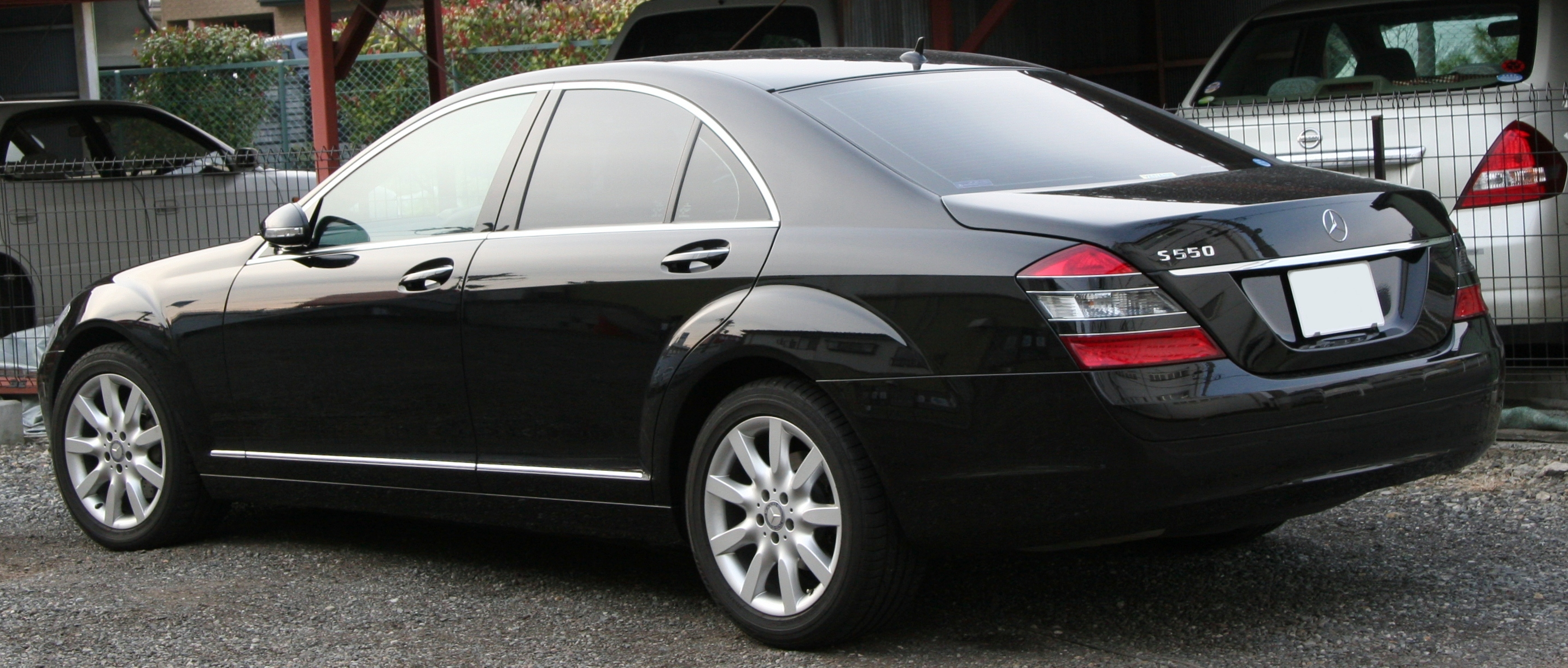
Mercedes-Benz S 550 short wheelbase (Japan)

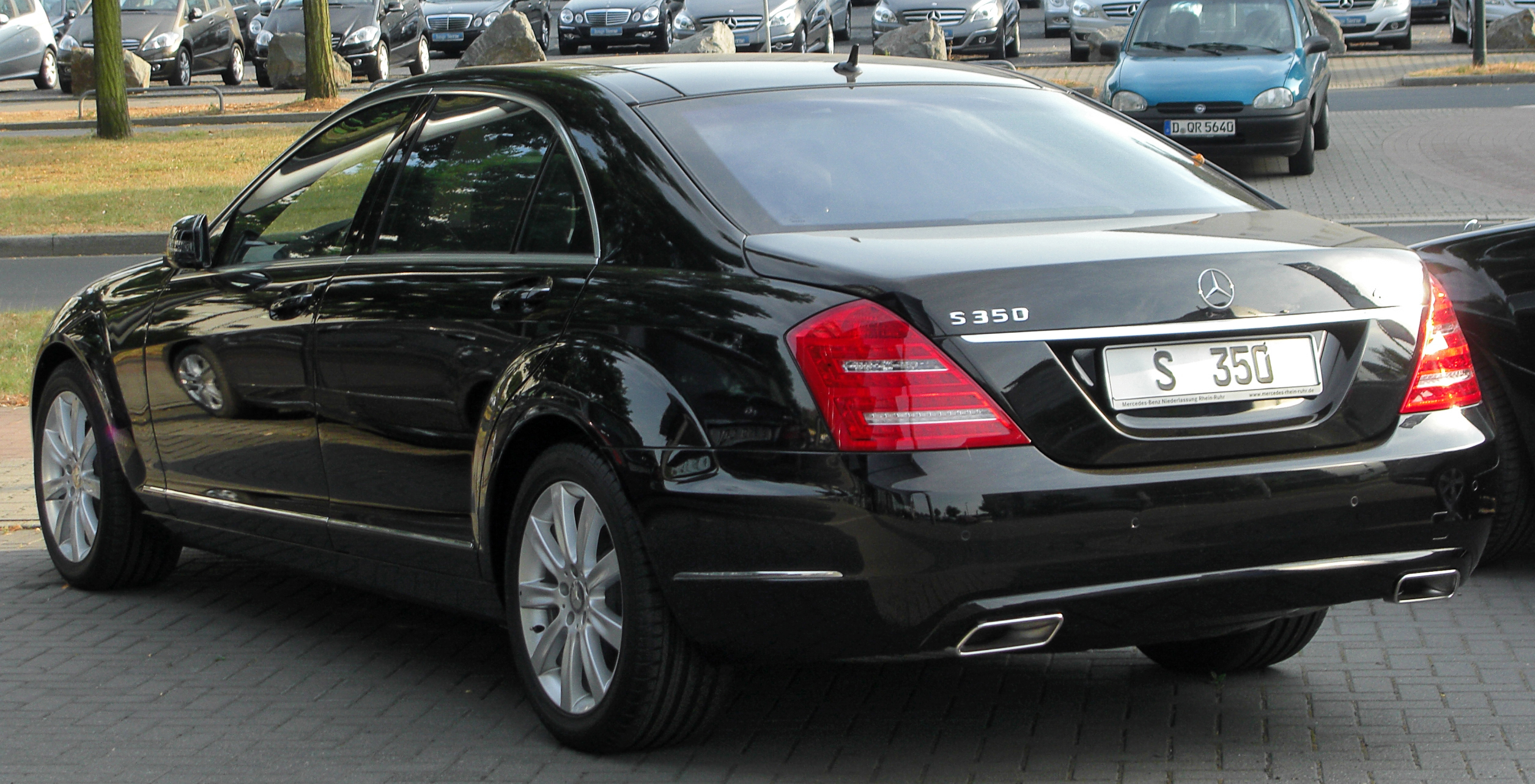
Mercedes-Benz S 350 4MATIC long wheelbase (Europe)

The W221 was introduced in the autumn of 2005 at the Frankfurt International Motor Show, with sales starting in autumn of 2005 and export to other markets beginning in 2006. Again there was a big change in design. The W221 S-Class made its North American premiere at the 2006 North American International Auto Show in January. The W221 is slightly larger in all dimensions than its predecessor, and it features three newly developed engines with up to 26% power increase. The interior is completely new, all materials have been upgraded and make for a more luxurious ride, and the center console transmission gear lever has been replaced with a column-mounted shifter. New technological features on the W221 include an infrared Night View Assist feature and the latest Mercedes-Benz pre-collision system. The W221 features sharper exterior styling (most notably wide fender arcs) and technological improvements. The W221 is the second consecutive generation of the S-Class to be solely produced in a sedan body style.

Models sold in North America are the S450 (2008– , SWB and Canada only), S400 Hybrid (2010– ), S350 Bluetec 4MATIC (2012– ), S550, S600, S63 AMG and S65 AMG; other models to be sold outside North America include the S280, S350, S300, S420 CDI and S320 CDI. The first W221 model released in North America and Japan was the S550 (called S500 outside North America), with the S600 arriving in the following spring.

In the US for the 2010 model year, the S-Class received a facelift across the entire model line in mid-2009, with a new S400 Hybrid version. Daytime LED running lights were fitted to the outer edges of the bi-xenon lamp units. The rear end was accented with a total of 52 distinctively arranged LEDs in the two taillights. Gone are the body-coloured strips through the tail lamps. Other noticeable changes at the front of the car are a more pronounced arrow-shaped grille, a new front bumper with a light-catching contour, and a chrome strip below the cooling air intakes. New, sleeker rear-view door mirrors with LED turn signals were also added. The exhaust tailpipes of all S-Class variants were visibly integrated into the rear bumper. The wheels were updated to more modern-style ones. Safety is also improved on most Mercedes-Benz models with the orange-coloured light reflectors mounted on the sides of the bumpers. The C-Class look at the front is removed. Some shiny chrome is added to the bottom of the doors and bumper.

The S550 can accelerate from 0–100 km/h (62 mph) in 5.4 seconds. Despite weighing 2,304 kg (5,079 lb), the S65 AMG completes 0–100 km/h (0–62 mph) in 4.2 seconds. The S600 makes the same sprint in about 4.6 seconds.

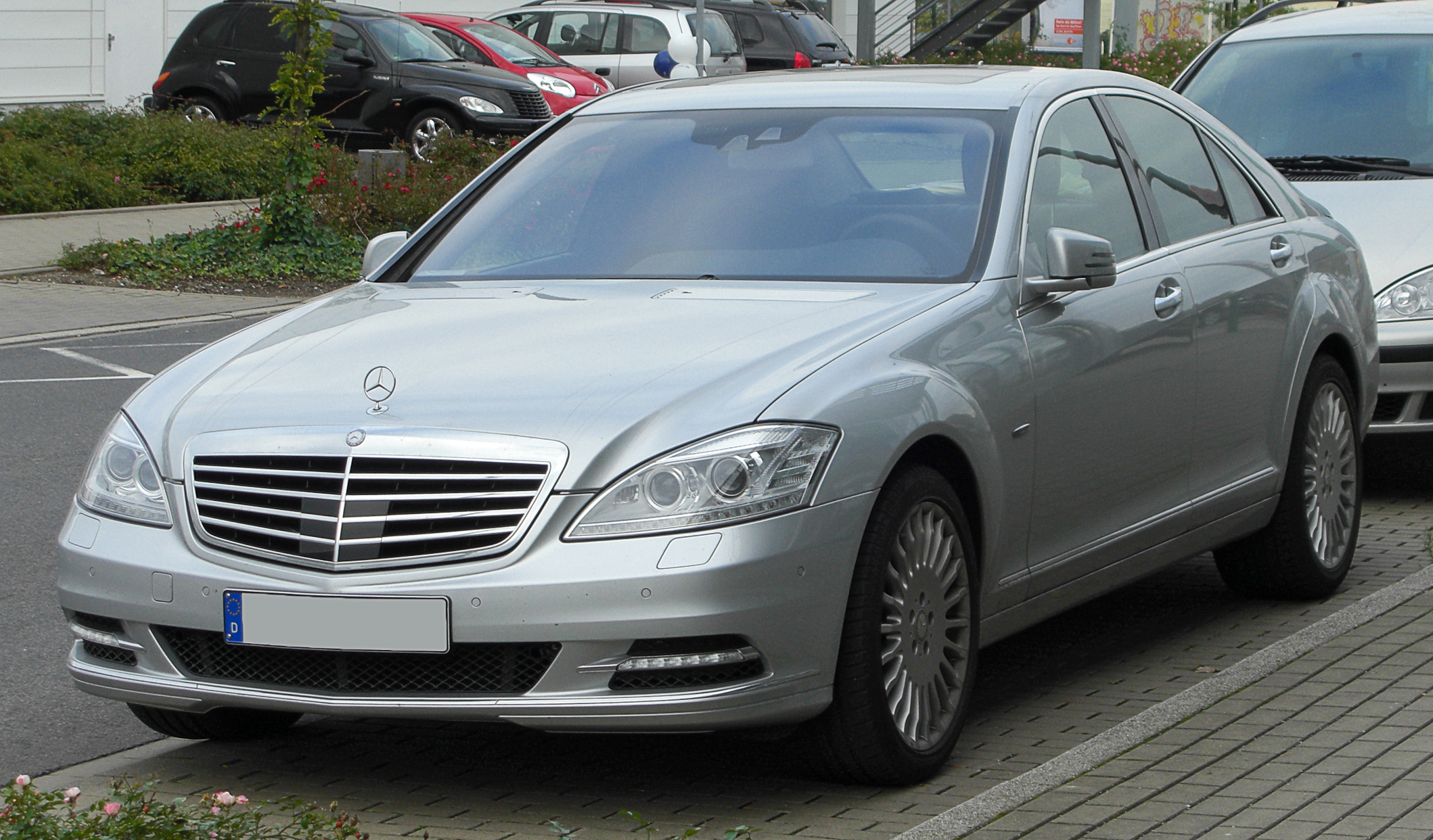
2010 Mercedes-Benz S400 BlueHybrid (Germany)

The brakes continue to become more advanced with the new Brake Assist Plus system monitoring for an impending collision and increasing braking if needed, while the Distronic Plus radar-guided cruise control can now bring the car to a complete stop. This system works in outdoor conditions; a test demonstration by Mercedes-Benz in a crash-test hall resulted in embarrassment for the company when a new S-Class crashed into the back of a stationary W220 S-Class. This incident was later attributed to the radar system malfunctioning inside the radar-reflective (i.e. radar-confusing) steel test building where the event was filmed.

Upscale department store Saks Fifth Avenue offered 20 special-edition S600 sedans for sale in its 2005 Christmas catalog. All 20 cars, priced at US$145,000 each, were sold on November 22, 2005, in under seven minutes. The Saks-edition S600 sedans were finished in a mocha black exterior with an almond beige interior and were the first examples of the S600 to be sold to private owners. The S600s came with nearly every option standard. In 2007, Automobile Magazine named the W221 S-Class as one of its 2007 "All-Stars" over rivals from Lexus and BMW, and Car and Driver selected the S550 as the winner in a five-way comparison test of flagship luxury sedans, as did Motor Trend Magazine in July 2009 in a three-way comparison test, with the other two competitors being the BMW 750Li, and Audi A8L 4.2 Quattro. The W221 S-Class was also the recipient of several other motoring awards (see following).

== Sixth generation (W222/C217/A217; 2013) ==
Sixth generation
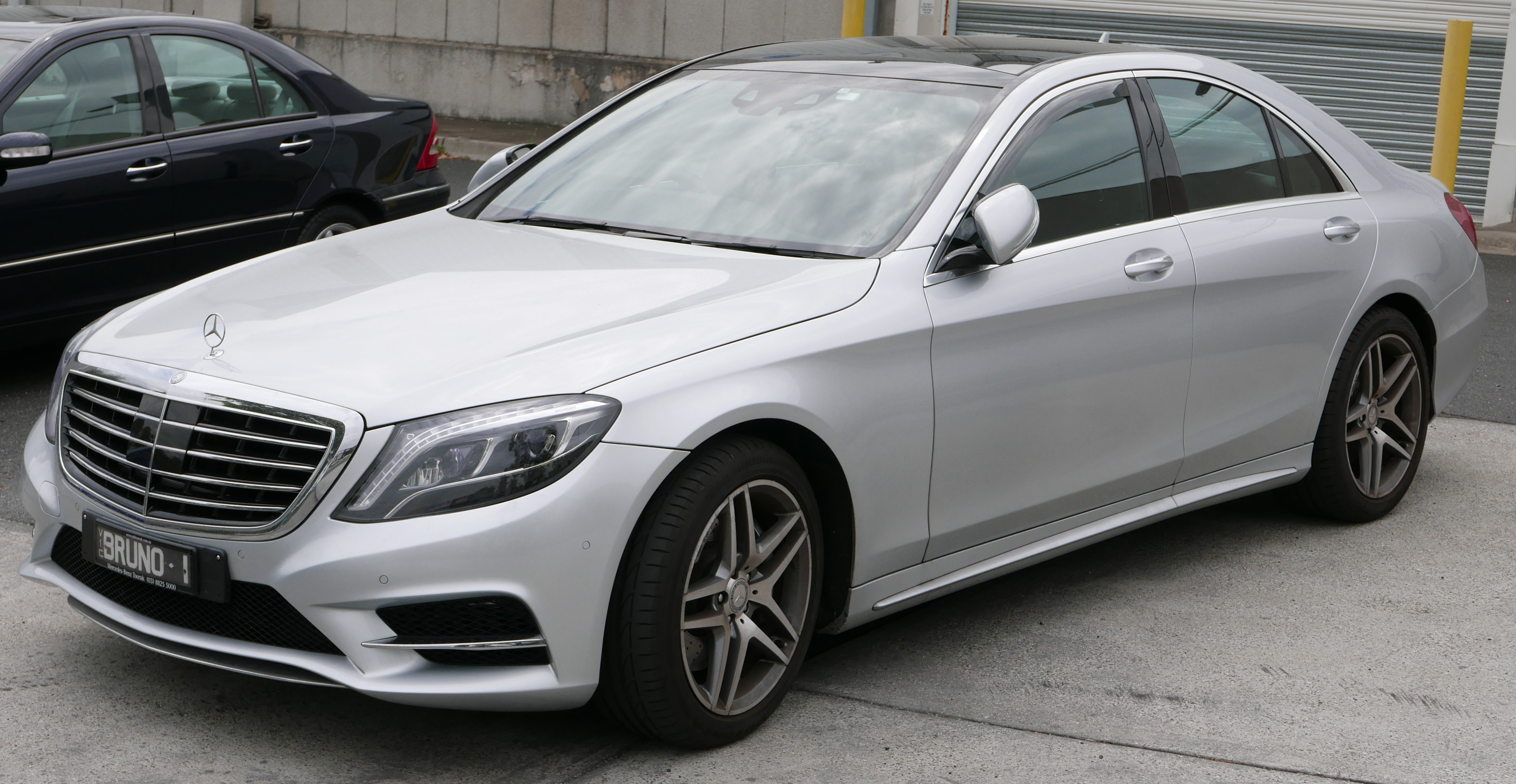

Overview
- Model code: W222 (Sedan); C217 (Coupé); A217 (Cabriolet)
- Production: June 2013–September 2020 (W222); November 2014–August 2020 (C217/A217)
- Model years: 2014–2020 (W222); 2015–2021 (C217/A217)

Body and chassis
- Layout: Front engine, rear-wheel drive or four-wheel drive

Powertrain
- Transmission: 7-speed 7G-Tronic / 9-speed 9G-Tronic automatic

Dimensions
- Wheelbase: SWB: 3,035 mm (119.5 in); LWB: 3,165 mm (124.6 in)
- Length: SWB: 5,116 mm (201.4 in); LWB: 5,248 mm (206.6 in)
- Width: 1,899 mm (74.8 in)
- Height: 1,496 mm (58.9 in)

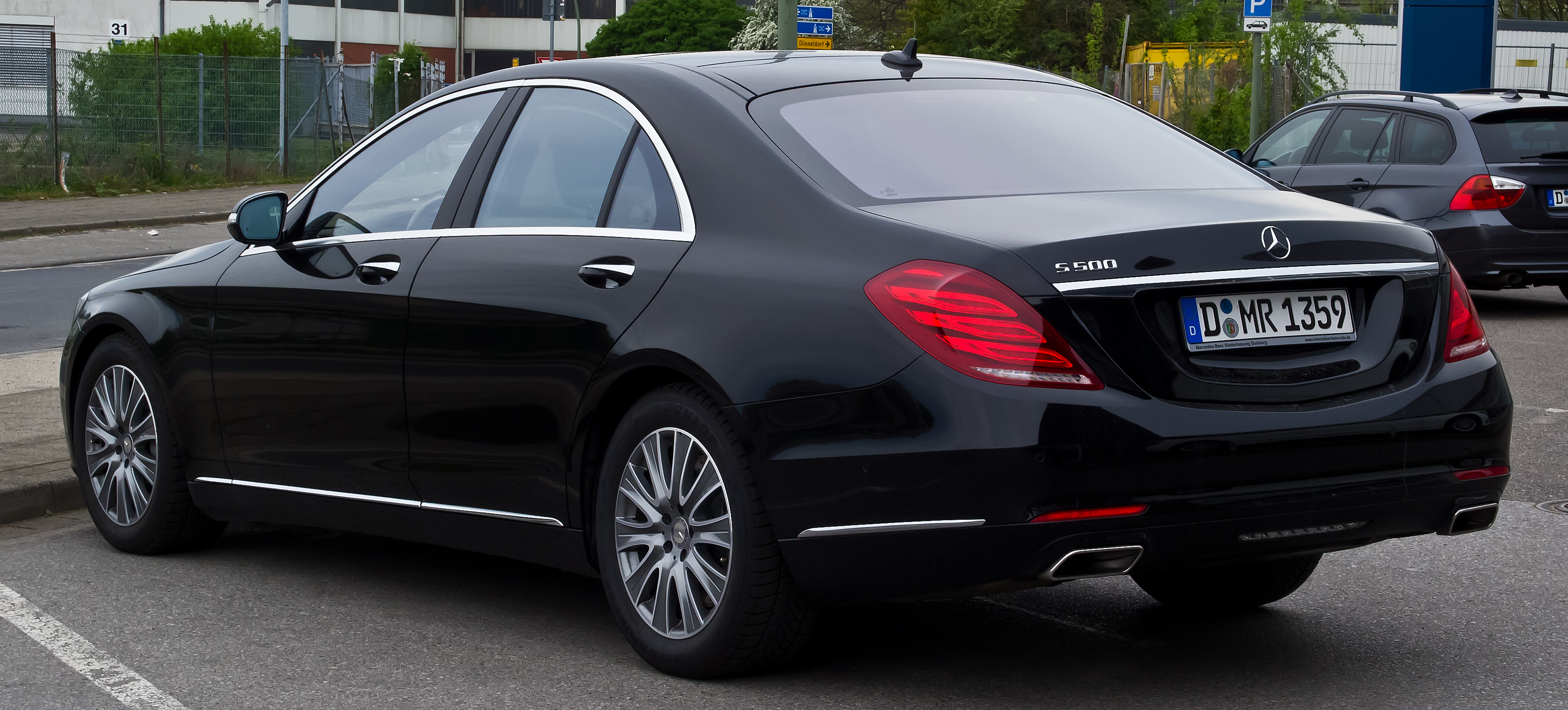
Mercedes-Benz S 500 short wheelbase (Germany)

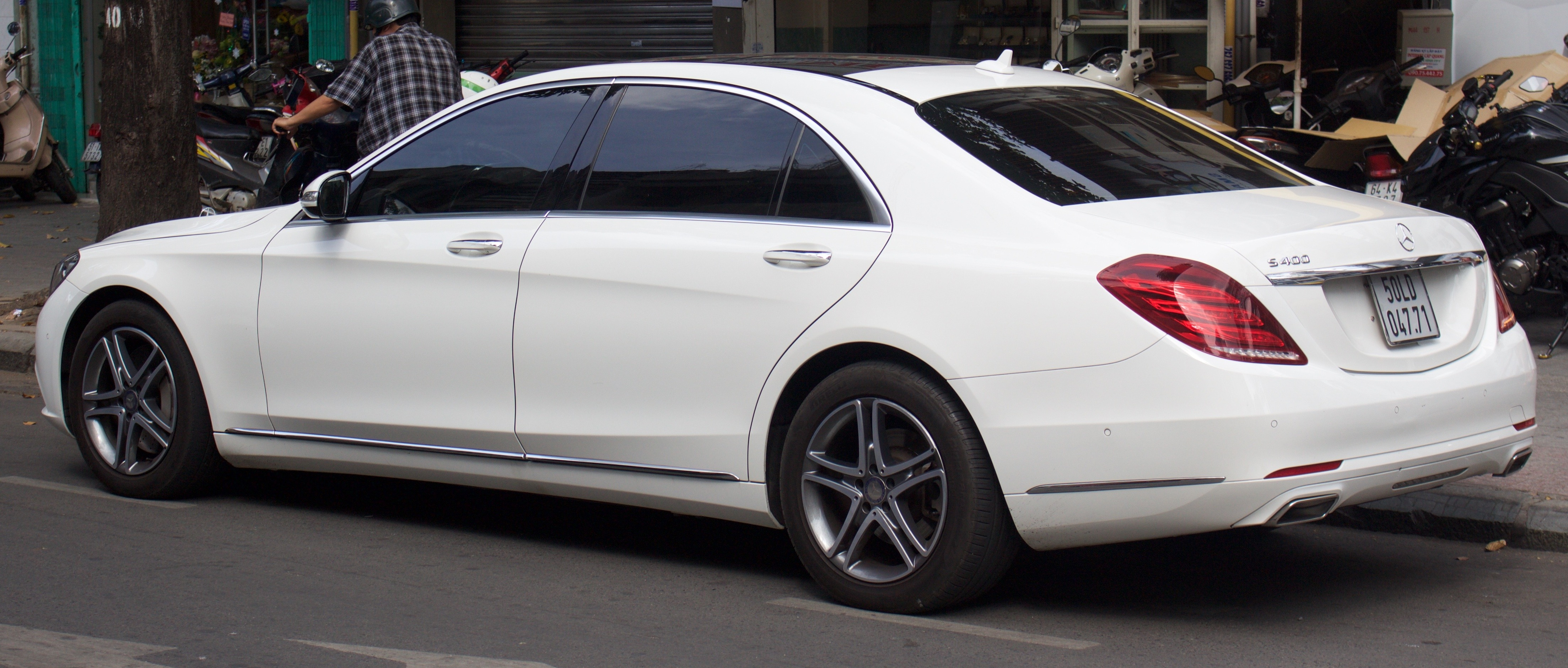
Mercedes-Benz S 400 long-wheelbase (Vietnam)

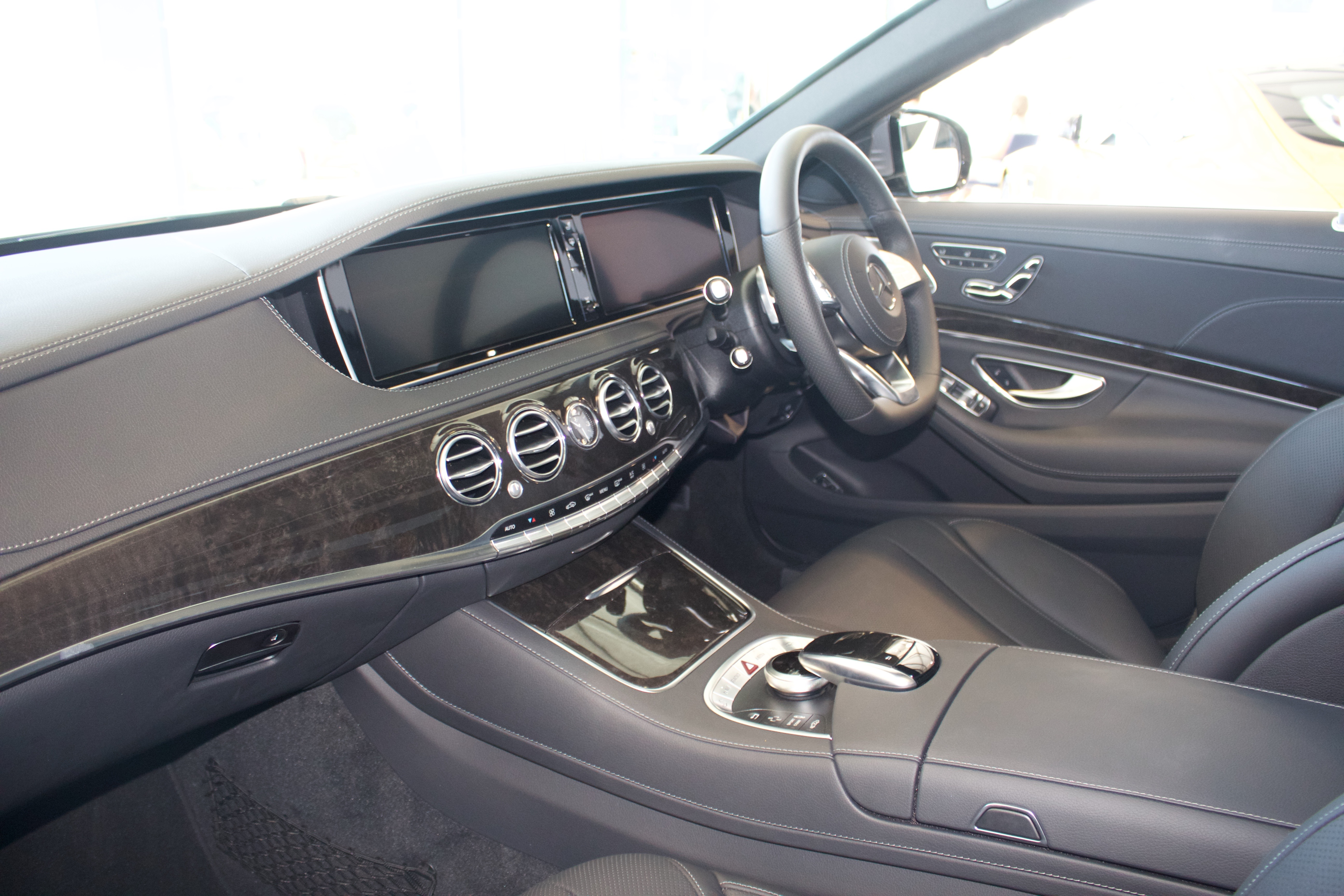
Interior

Officially unveiled in May 2013, the new S-Class has a more streamlined appearance than the outgoing model. Some interesting features include a large front grille inspired by the F700 Concept car and LED lights used exclusively inside and out – a first in the automotive industry. Two strong converging character lines give the flanks a more sculpted look, while integrated exhaust tips and a large glass roof (likely optional) highlight the design.

Along with the sedan, the S-Class spawned a coupe (Mercedes-Benz C217) and convertible (Mercedes-Benz A217) as well as an extended-wheelbase 'Pullman' variant, longer than the long-wheelbase 'L.' While the short-wheelbase model carries chassis code W222, the long-wheelbase model uses chassis code V222. Unlike previous generations, Mercedes focused primarily on the development of the longer model as many customers in the fast-growing Asian markets prefer to be chauffeured.

=== Equipment ===
Inside, almost every surface is covered by a 'luxury' material – everything that looks like leather is genuine leather, and metal is used rather than any plastic alternative. The instrument cluster consists entirely of two widescreens (305 mm diagonal) LCDs with animated graphics. A 'Head-Up' display and gesture-responsive touchpad became options in early 2014. It featured a new infotainment system.

The W222 debuts the available Magic Body Control, consisting of windshield-mounted stereo cameras that can 'read' the road ahead (Road Surface Scan) and communicate with the Active Body Control suspension to ready it for an uneven road surface. Initially available only on 8-cylinder models and above, Magic Ride Control attempts to isolate the car's body by predicting rather than reacting to broken pavement and speed humps.

Available luxury appointments over and above what was offered in the W221 include a choice of massage type for each seat occupant (the W221 offered various intensities of a single massage type) and two levels of premium audio systems from the luxury German brand, Burmester.

The W222 has driver assistance systems aboard that allow it to steer a course within a lane and follow a leading vehicle for a short period (DISTRONIC PLUS with Steering Assist, also called traffic jam assistant). It will also slow or come to a dead stop and accelerate in response to traffic ahead. Mercedes engineers claim to have, under controlled conditions, ridden aboard a W222 S Class that has driven autonomously for 50 km, merely by altering parameters controlling equipment already fitted. Such modifications are not available to the general public.

=== Powertrain ===
Like the W221 S500, the W222 S-Class is powered by a more powerful twin-turbo V8 producing 339 kW (455 hp) while the S600 is powered by a twin-turbo V12. There is also a diesel-powered S350 BlueTEC version, a hybrid S400 with a 20 kW (27 PS; 27 hp) electric motor and 228 kW (310 PS; 306 bhp) V6 engine, a diesel-electric hybrid S300 BlueTEC. An S500 Plug-in Hybrid was later introduced at the Frankfurt Motor Show (IAA) with a market release in 2014 and claimed a 3 L/100 km (94 mpg_{‑imp}; 78 mpg_{‑US}) economy, a CO_{2} rating of 69 g/km (3.9 oz/mi) and up to 30 km (19 mi) of emissions-free driving. The S500 Plug-In hybrid is fitted with a 245 kW (334 PS; 329 bhp) 3-litre V6 and an 80 kW (109 PS; 107 hp) electric motor. An AMG modified V8 bi-turbo and V12 bi-turbo were offered in the S63 and S65 respectively. This generation S-Class was offered with a 7-speed or 9-speed automatic transmission.

== Seventh generation (W223; 2020) ==
Seventh generation
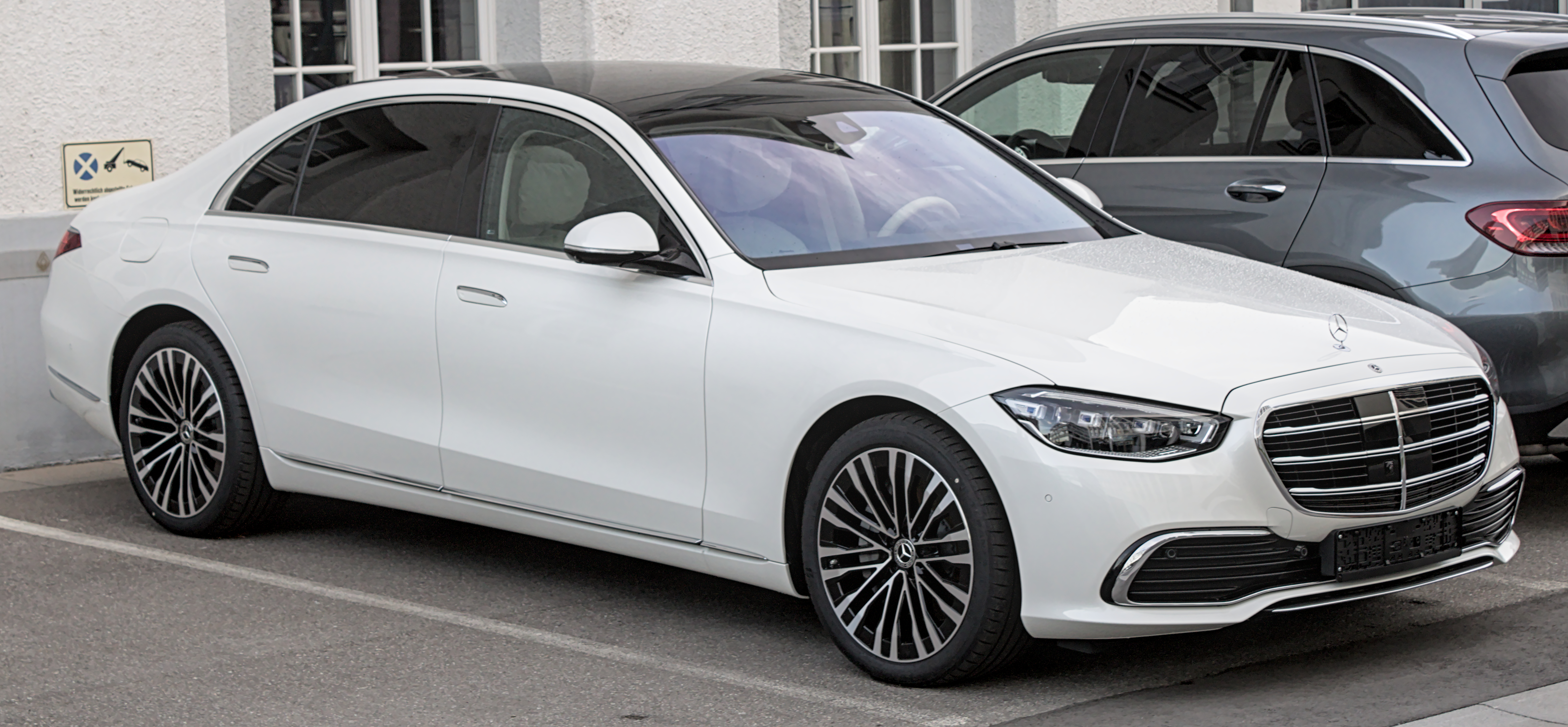

Overview
- Model code: W223
- Production: 2020–present

Body and chassis
- Layout: Front engine, rear-wheel drive or four-wheel drive

Powertrain
- Transmission: 9-speed 9G-Tronic automatic

Dimensions
- Wheelbase: SWB: 3,106 mm (122.3 in); LWB: 3,216 mm (126.6 in)
- Length: SWB: 5,179 mm (203.9 in); LWB: 5,289 mm (208.2 in)
- Width: 1,954 mm (76.9 in)
- Height: 1,503 mm (59.2 in)

The W223 was unveiled on 2 September 2020. This generation does not feature a coupe or convertible model, as these body styles were replaced by the next generation AMG GT and SL-Class models respectively. The interior includes up to five displays, an augmented reality head-up display and an ambient lighting system. Additionally, the W223 S-Class is the first production car to feature rear seat airbags that deploy by inflating supporting structures, allowing ambient air to fill the bag rather than using a fully gas-inflated design. On 5 December 2022, Mercedes-AMG debuted the S 63 E Performance V8 PHEV with 802 hp.

On January 26, 2026, a facelift model debuted.

== Engineering ==
Mercedes-Benz has been able to exploit their perceived engineering know-how as a marketing tool, culminating in its one-time slogan, "engineered like no other car in the world." This slogan was used throughout the 1980s with the marketing of the W126 S-Class. However, following the formation of DaimlerChrysler and the cessation of engineer-sanctioned overbudgeting in the late 1990s, this slogan was dropped. The subsequent W220 model S-Class was reported to suffer from relatively lower reliability and quality rates than previous models. However, ratings have been improving since the W221.

== Concept cars ==
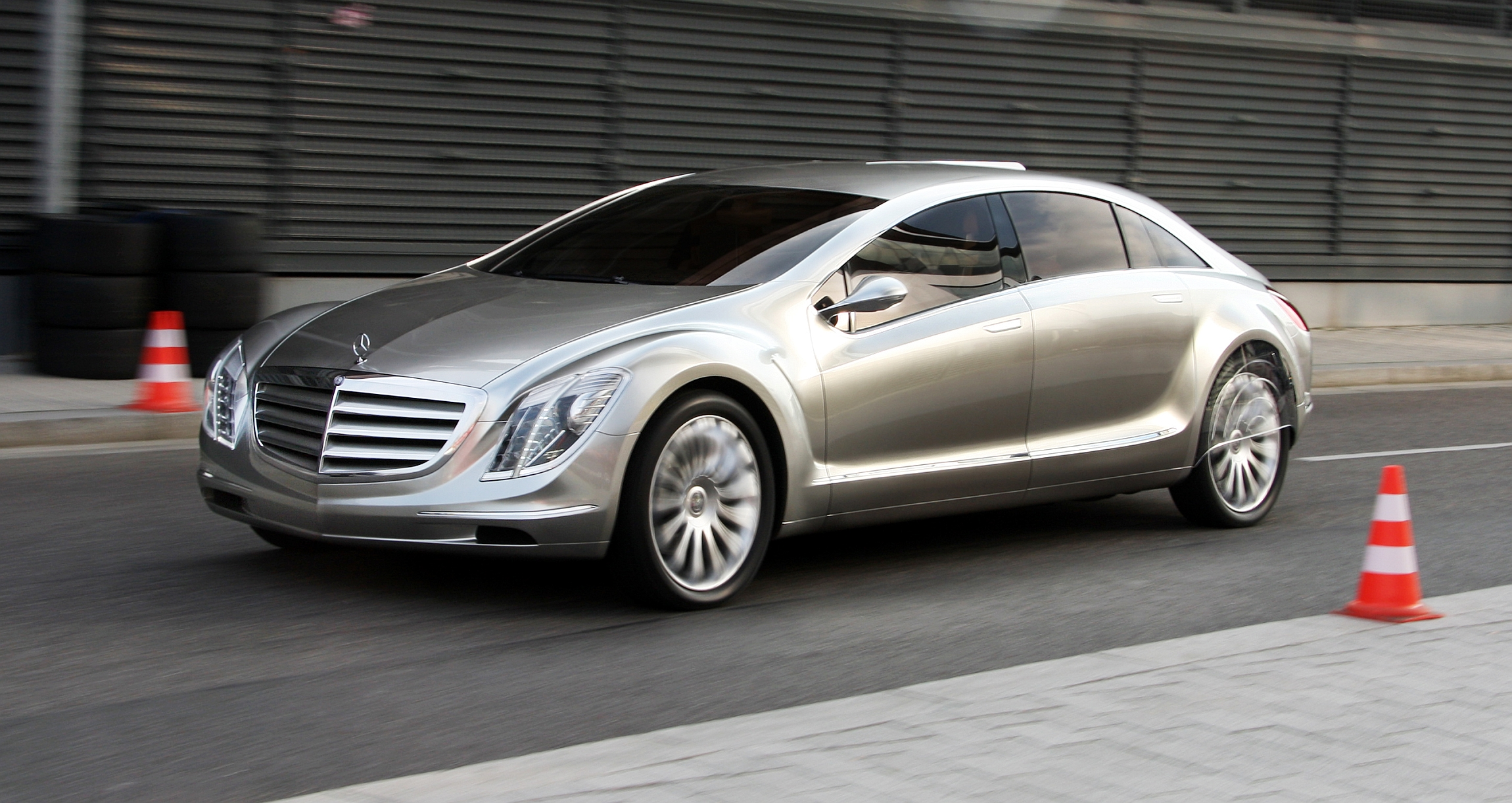
The F700 research car

In the 1980s, Mercedes-Benz built the world's first driverless cars using the S-Class, together with the team of Professor Ernst Dickmanns at Bundeswehr LMU Munich. The culmination of this effort was achieved in 1995, when Dickmanns' re-engineered autonomous S-Class robot completed a trip from Munich, Bavaria to Copenhagen, Denmark and back. On the autobahn, the robot S-Class achieved speeds exceeding 175 km/h (109 mph). It suggested and executed overtaking maneuvers. The car's abilities left a big impression on many observers and are said to have heavily influenced robot car research and funding decisions worldwide.

A concept future hybrid, the F700 research car, was also unveiled at the 2007 Frankfurt Motor Show. The F700 featured three regular opening doors and a fourth door capable of 180-degree rotation. The concept also featured bulletproof and puncture-resistant tires.

== Safety ==
Mercedes-Benz has traditionally introduced its safety innovations in the S-Class. For instance, the S-Class was the first car in Europe to incorporate airbags. S-Class safety features included innovations in active safety (accident avoidance), passive safety (collision protection), and holistic safety (integration of both active and passive safety features). Active safety features include: ABS braking in 1978 (acts to reduce braking distances and improve stopping control; co-developed with Bosch); traction control and Electronic Stability Program (ESP) in 1995 (improves driver control during difficult road conditions); and Brake Assist (provides full braking power during emergency stops). In 2005, a new infrared night vision feature was introduced (improves visibility during nighttime conditions). Despite the popular misconception, the S-Class was not the first car fitted with ABS braking technology, although some credit can be given for popularizing this now largely standard feature (ABS was initially an option on most models of the W126 S-Class). Active lane keeping became standard in 2011.

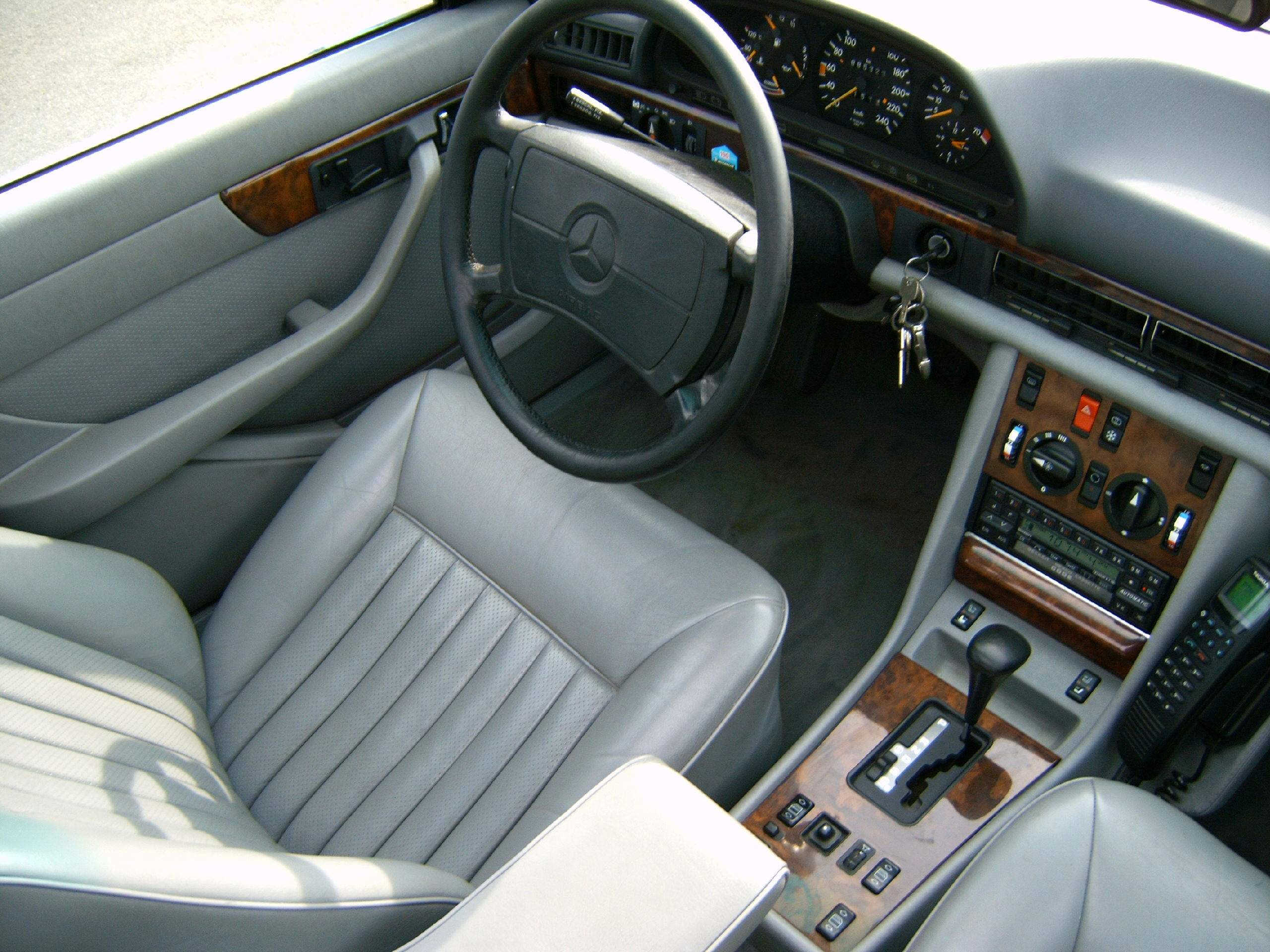
W126 500 SEL cabin with driver's side airbag SRS

Passive safety features include: crumple zones in 1957 (vehicle body structure absorbs the force of impact); collapsible steering column (prevents the steering column from protruding into the cabin during accidents), strengthened occupant cell enhanced occupant protection during severe impacts (rollovers); pre-accident seatbelt tensioning (tightens seatbelts prior to impact), and sandwich platforms (allows the engine to slide under the occupants in a head-on collision).

PRE-SAFE, Mercedes-Benz's holistic safety feature, was introduced on the S-Class in 2002. PRE-SAFE integrates multiple active and passive safety features for a "safety net" approach to vehicle safety by attempting to prevent accidents; if accidents do occur, PRE-SAFE aims to reduce occupant injury. In the latest version of this pre-collision system, PRE-SAFE will prime the brake assist system, lock the doors to prevent accidental opening during the accident, adjust the seats, close the windows and sunroof, and tighten seatbelts during certain types of collisions. In the event an accident results in a rollover, the PRE-SAFE feature unlocks the doors and lowers the windows approximately 1 cm (1/2 in) to allow you to exit or safety workers to gain access easily.

Rear seat airbags are a world-first and will be introduced on the W223. In addition, E-ACTIVE BODY CONTROL is available for the first time on an S-Class.

=== S-Guard ===
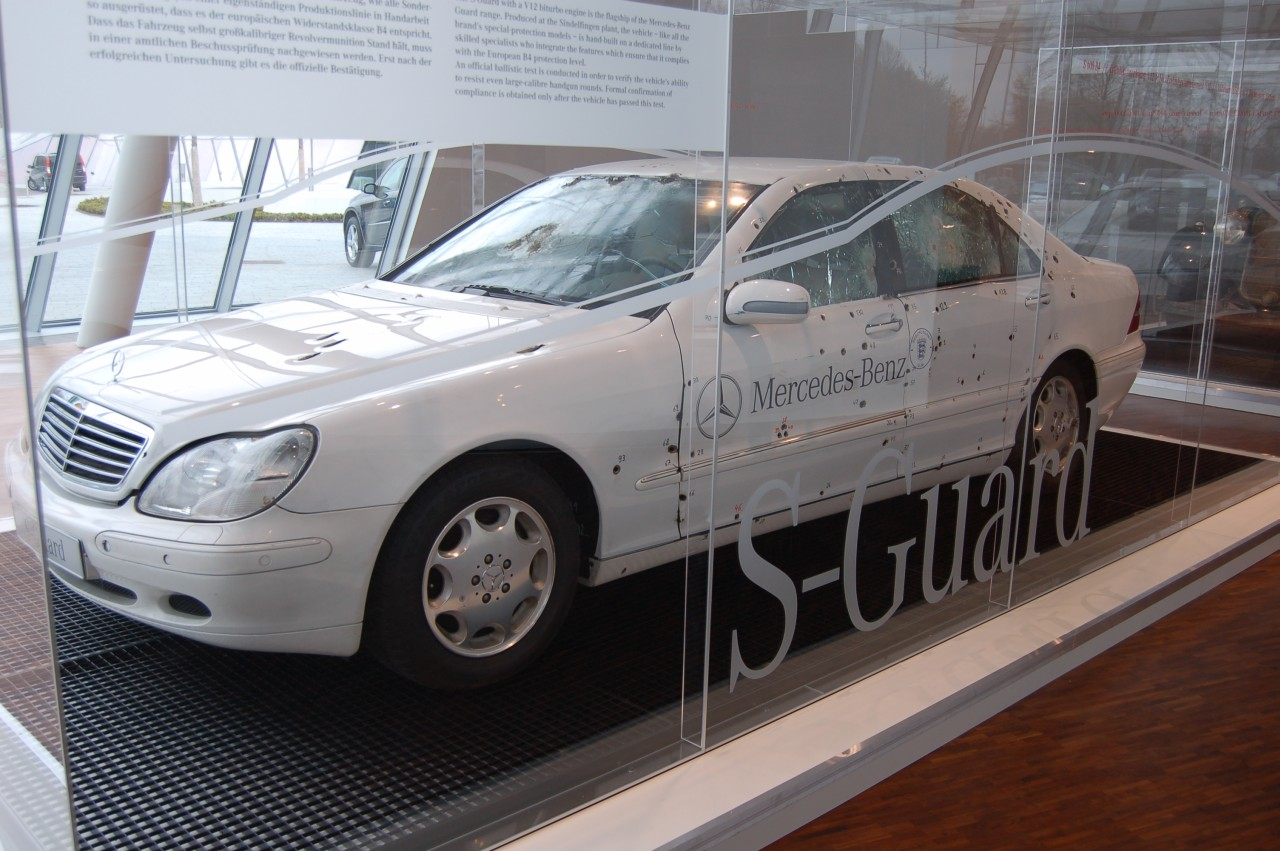
A W220 S-Guard in 2007

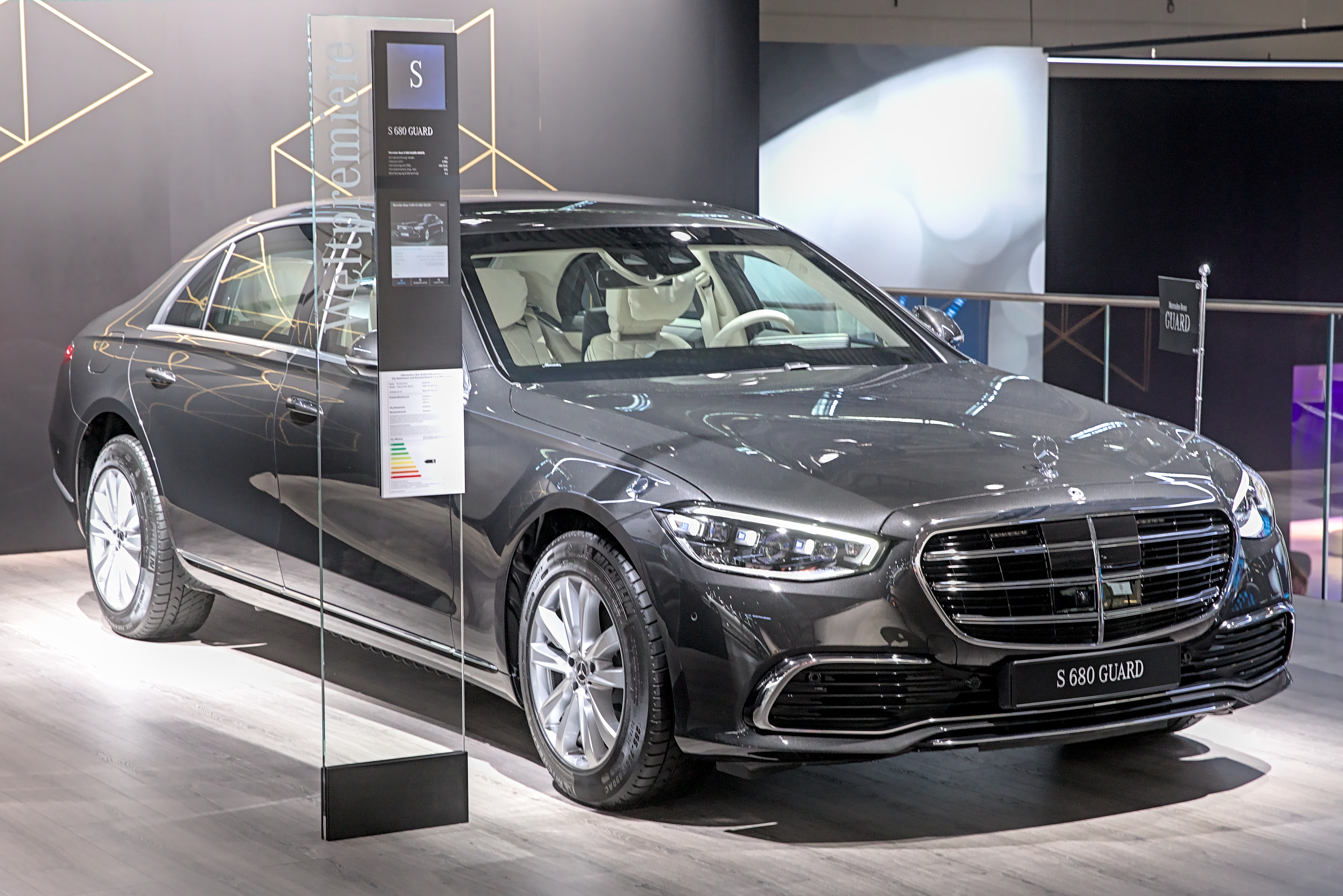
A W223 S-Guard in 2021

A special armored version of the Mercedes-Benz S-Class has been produced, known as the S-Guard. Features include the capability to withstand small arms fire and certain explosive devices, a self-sealing fuel tank, and an alarm system.

In 2009, Mercedes-Benz launched a long-wheelbase version of the S-Guard, known as the Pullman Guard. This model is 1,100 mm (45 in) longer than the standard model. It also has a higher roof and a taller rear window, with a different rake. The Pullman Guard is also available in the W222 and the W223.

The S-Guard is widely used at the diplomatic level to protect world leaders. Ninety governments worldwide are known to use the S-Guard for the transport of government leaders and dignitaries. The S-Guard is built on a special production line at the S-Class facility in Sindelfingen, Germany, with specific S-Guard enhancements integrated at multiple stages throughout the production process.

== Production ==
Most S-Class models, including the W221, are built at the Daimler AG plant in Sindelfingen, Germany, and the Mercedes-Benz-Valdez plant in Santiago Tianguistenco, Mexico. Founded by Daimler Motoren Gesellschaft in 1915, the Sindelfingen plant also produced the model 600 "Grosser Mercedes" and past generations of the S-Class. Previous S-Class models (such as the W126) were built in different locations ranging from Stuttgart to South Africa, but with recent models (such as the W220) production has been concentrated in Sindelfingen and Santiago Tianguistenco. In February 2007, DaimlerChrysler Malaysia's (now, Mercedes-Benz Malaysia) plant in Pekan, Pahang began production of S350 (model W221) vehicles and is currently assembling S300, S350L, and S500L. In all, some 2.7 million S-Class vehicles have been produced in the past forty years.

- W116: 473,035
- W126: 818,036
- W140: 406,532
- W220: 485,000
- W221: ~516,000 split in 85,900 ('06), 85,500 ('07), 90,600 ('08), 53,400 ('09), 66,500 ('10), 68,969 ('11), 65,128 ('12)
- W222: 373,637 split in 103,737 ('14), 106,200 ('15), 84,300 ('16), 79,400 ('17)

== Sales ==
| Calendar year | US (hybrid) | Germany | China |
|---|---|---|---|
| 1999 | | 22,966 | |
| 2000 | | 21,989 | |
| 2001 | 25,998 | 18,347 | |
| 2002 | 21,118 | 11,395 | |
| 2003 | 22,940 | 9,865 | |
| 2004 | 20,460 | 7,045 | |
| 2005 | 16,036 | 6,718 | |
| 2006 | 30,886 | 10,985 | |
| 2007 | 26,081 | 8,262 | |
| 2008 | 17,787 | 8,077 | |
| 2009 | 11,199 () | 6,617 | 14,959 |
| 2010 | 13,608 (955) | 5,177 | 25,000 |
| 2011 | 12,258 | 4,730 | 31,050 |
| 2012 | 11,794 | 3,304 | 33,140 |
| 2013 | 13,303 | 4,963 | 20,448 (11 months) |
| 2014 | 25,276 | 8,617 | 28,054 |
| 2015 | 21,934 | 7,312 | 26,234 |
| 2016 | 18,803 | 6,812 | |
| 2017 | 15,888 | 6,759 | |
| 2018 | 14,978 | 6,527 | |
| 2019 | | | |
| 2020 | | | |
| 2021 | | | |
| 2022 | | | |
| 2023 | | | 23,328 |
| 2024 | | | 16,145 |
| 2025 | | | 10,427 |

== Awards ==
Notable examples of awards received by the Mercedes-Benz S-Class include the top ranking in the J.D. Power Sales Satisfaction Index from 1987 to 1990, seven time ranking as What Car? "Best Luxury Car", and five times as Fleet News "Luxury Car of the Year". The S-Class was Wheels Magazine Car of the Year for 1981 and 1999, U.S. Highway Loss Data Institute "Safest Passenger Car of the Year" in 1988 and 1989, and European Car of the Year in 1974. The S-Class is also the first car ever (2005) to receive an environmental certificate from the German Commission on Technical Compliance (TÜV). Other awards range from Popular Science Best of What's New—Grand Award 2005 to Top Gear magazine's "Limousine of the Year" for 2006.
