= Mercedes-Benz ESF 2009 Experimental Safety Vehicle =

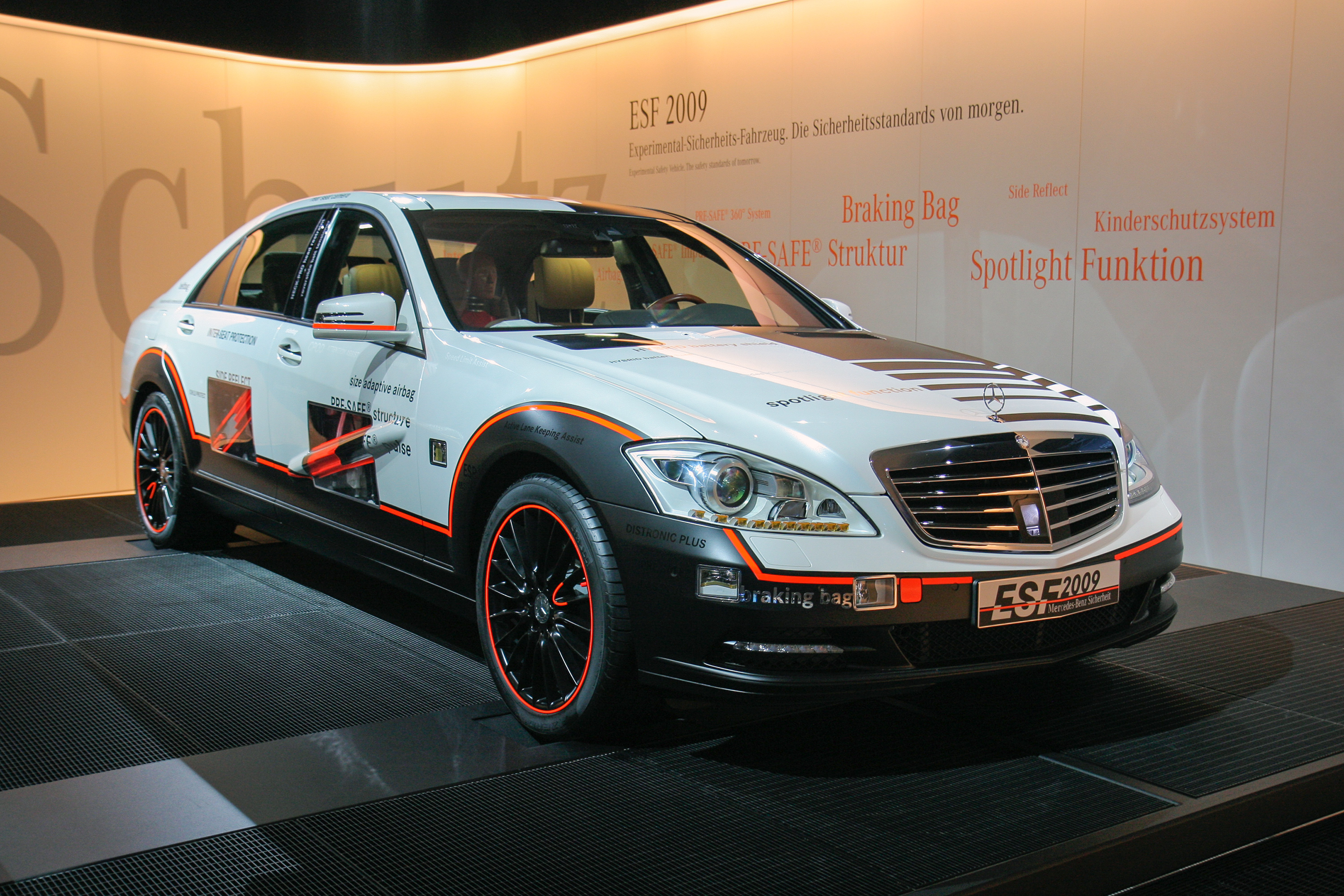
ESF 2009 Experimental Safety Vehicle based on Mercedes-Benz S 400 Hybrid (V221)

The Mercedes-Benz ESF 2009 Experimental Safety Vehicle is a safety research vehicle based on the S400 Hybrid, unveiled in 2009.

== Innovations ==
- Spotlight function: Production version called Night View Assist Plus with Spotlight Function, introduced on the Mercedes-Benz CL-Class (C216) in 2011.
- Beltbag: Production version called Beltbag, introduced on the Mercedes-Benz S-Class (W222) in 2013.
- Interactive Vehicle Communication: Production version called Car-to-X Communication with Drive Kit Plus, introduced on the Mercedes-Benz S-Class (W222) in 2013.
- Full-LED headlamps with Partial main beam: Production version called Adaptive Highbeam Assist PLUS, introduced on the Mercedes-Benz S-Class (W222) in 2013.
- PRE-SAFE Pulse: Production versions called PRE-SAFE Impulse, introduced on the Mercedes-Benz S-Class (W222) in 2013 and PRE-SAFE Impulse Side, introduced on the Mercedes-Benz E-Class (W213) in 2016.
- Braking Bag
- Child Protect System
- Hybrid Battery Shield
- Interseat Protection (Center airbag)
- PRE-SAFE Structure
- PRE-SAFE 360°
- Rear seat camera
- Side Reflect
- Size Adaptive Airbags

The vehicle was unveiled at the Enhanced Safety of Vehicles (ESV) Conference in Stuttgart.
