= Mercedes-Benz 350 =

Mercedes-Benz has sold a number of automobiles with the "350" model name:

- 1971–1989 R107
  - 1972 350SL
- 1990–1991 W126
  - 1990–1991 350SDL Turbo
  - 1991 350SD Turbo
- 1994–1995 W140
  - 1994–1995 S350 Turbo Diesel
- 2005–2013 W221
  - 2005–2010 S350 V-6 Gasoline
  - 2010–2013 S350 BlueEfficiency V-6 Gasoline with direct-injection
  - 2009 S350 CDI BlueEfficiency V-6 Diesel
  - 2010–2013 S350 BlueTEC V-6 Clean Diesel
