= Mercedes-Benz S-Class (W221) =

Fifth generation of the S-Class

Mercedes-Benz S (W221)
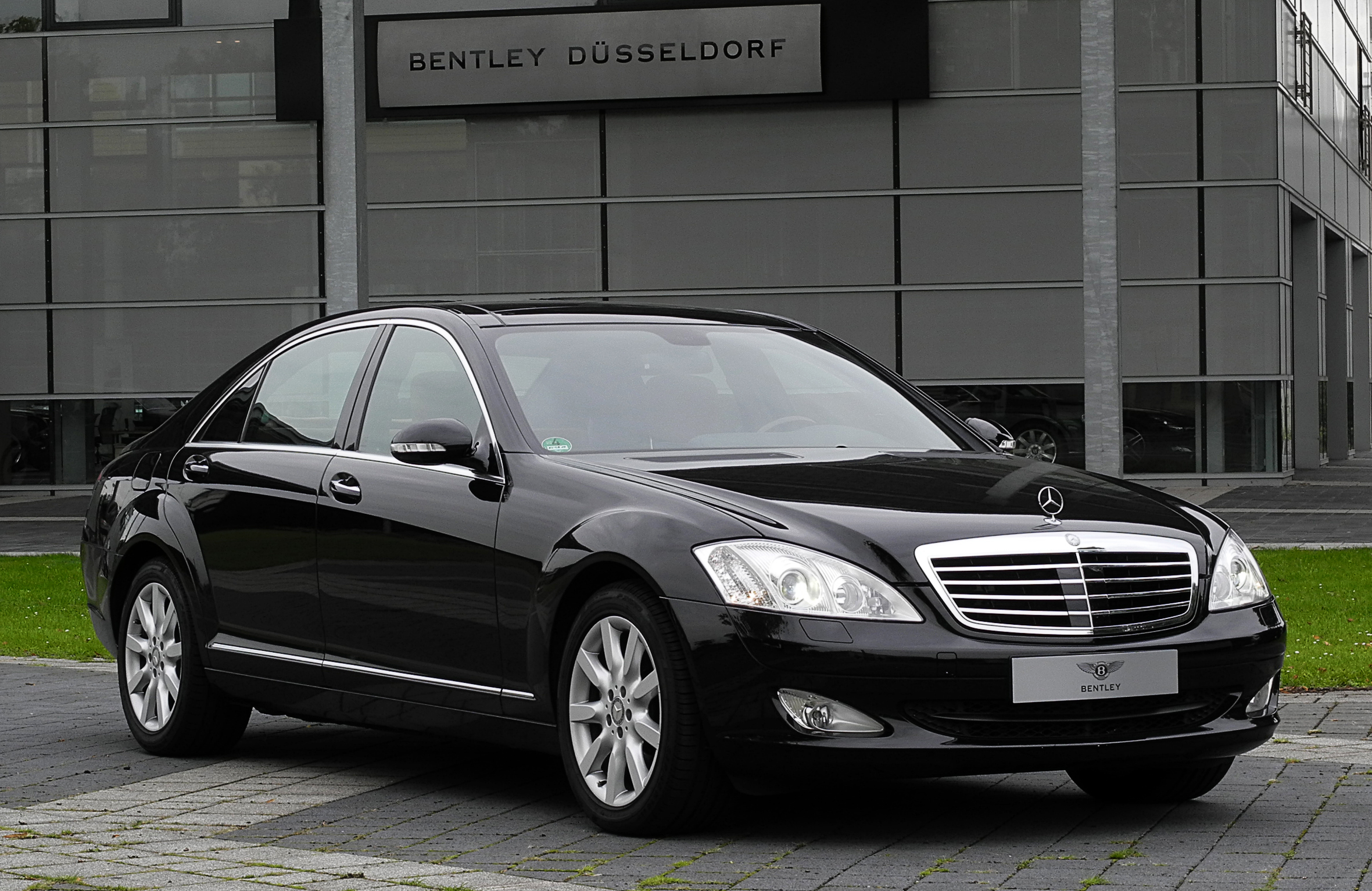

Overview
- Manufacturer: DaimlerChrysler (2005–2007); Daimler AG (2007–2013)
- Production: August 2005 – June 2013
- Model years: 2005–2013 (Worldwide); 2007–2013 (Canada & US)
- Assembly: Germany: Sindelfingen; Mexico: Toluca; Egypt: 6th of October City (EGA); Malaysia: Pekan (HICOM); Indonesia: Bogor (MBI)
- Designer: Gorden Wagener (2001)

Body and chassis
- Class: Full-size luxury car (F)
- Body style: 4-door saloon
- Layout: Front engine, rear-wheel drive / four-wheel drive
- Related: Mercedes-Benz CL-Class (C216)

Powertrain
- Engine: Petrol: 3.0–3.5 L M272 V6; 3.5 L M272 V6 hybrid; 4.7–5.5 L M273 V8; 4.7 L M278 twin-turbo V8; 5.5 L M157 twin-turbo V8; 6.2 L M156 V8; 5.5–6.0 L M275 twin-turbo V12; Diesel: 2.1 L OM651 turbo I4; 3.0 L OM642 turbo V6; 3.0 L OM642 turbo V6 hybrid; 4.0 L OM629 twin-turbo V8
- Electric motor: 20 hp (15 kW) Additional AC permanent-magnet synchronous electric motor
- Transmission: 5-speed 5G-Tronic automatic; 7-speed 7G-Tronic automatic
- Hybrid drivetrain: FHEV (Parallel Hybrid) (S400 Hybrid)

Dimensions
- Wheelbase: 3,035 mm (119.5 in); 3,165 mm (124.6 in) (LWB); 4,315 mm (169.9 in) (Pullman)
- Length: 2006–08 SWB: 5,076 mm (199.8 in); 2009–13 SWB: 5,079 mm (200.0 in); 2006–08 LWB: 5,208 mm (205.0 in); 2009–13 LWB: 5,218 mm (205.4 in)
- Width: 2006–08: 1,871 mm (73.7 in); 2009–13 1,872 mm (73.7 in); BlueHybrid: 83.3 in (2,116 mm)
- Height: 1,473 mm (58.0 in)
- Curb weight: from 1,955 kg (4,310 lb) (S 320 CDI) to 2,270 kg (5,000 lb) (S 65 AMG)

Chronology
- Predecessor: Mercedes-Benz S-Class (W220)
- Successor: Mercedes-Benz S-Class (W222)

The Mercedes-Benz W221 is a chassis code of the fifth generation S-Class, produced from August 2005 until June 2013. The W221 S-Class was unveiled at the 2005 Frankfurt Motor Show as the successor of the Mercedes-Benz S-Class (W220) and the predecessor of the Mercedes-Benz S-Class (W222).

== Styling ==
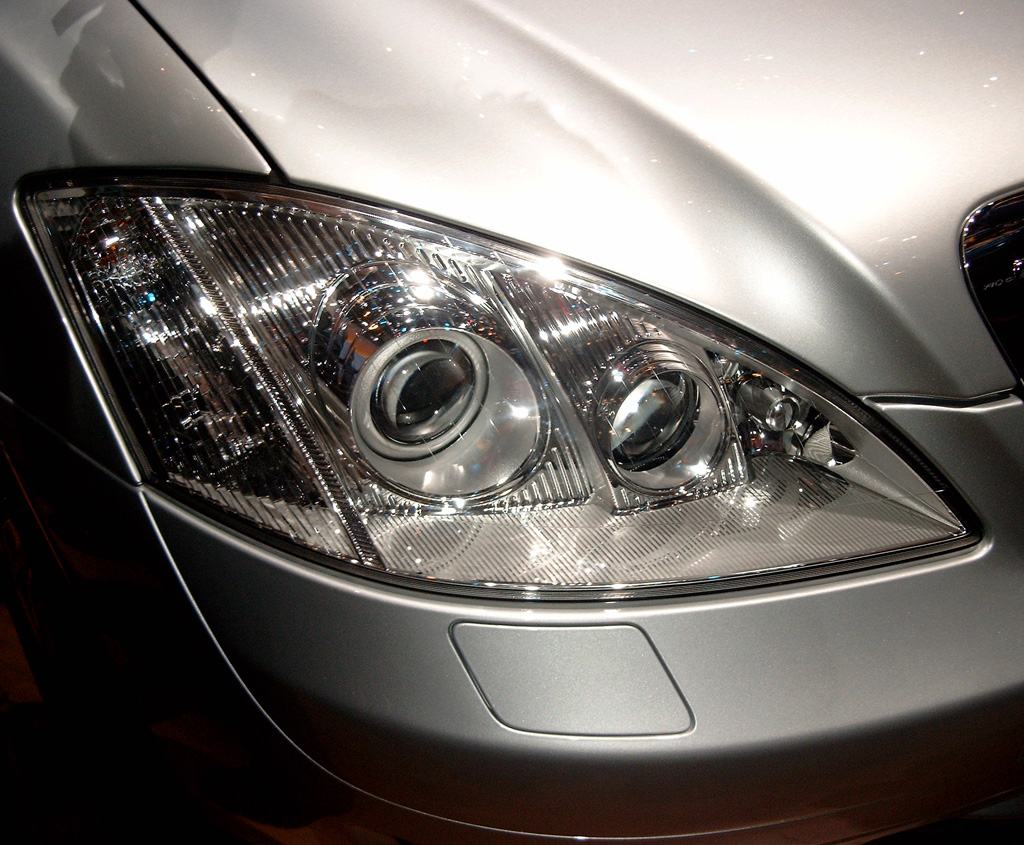
Night View Assist active infrared projector visible next to Bi-Xenon HID main headlight

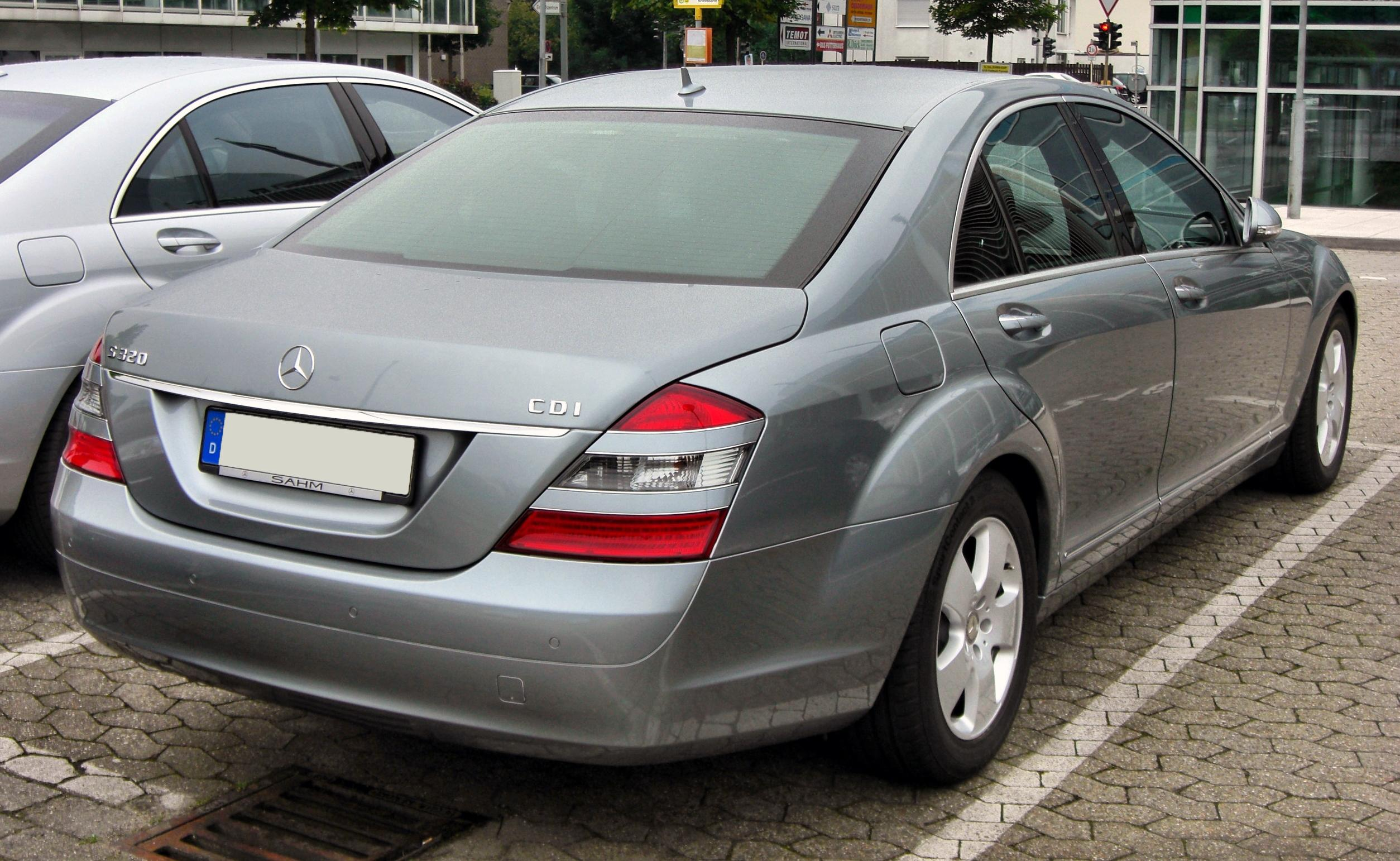
Pre-facelift Mercedes-Benz S 320 CDI (Germany)

The W221 S-Class' exterior styling is distinctly different from the W220. The W220 somewhat broke with tradition in being smaller than its W140 predecessor, whereas the W221 is larger in all dimensions than its predecessor, offers more interior space, and has improved performance. The rear styling is similar to the Mercedes-Benz Maybach – the larger saloon from Daimler AG's other flagship brand, which was presented to the public in 1997. Development began in 1999, with the design work beginning in 2000 at the Advanced Design Center in Tokyo, and the final design by Gorden Wagener at the Sindelfingen Advanced Design Center being approved in 2001, frozen for production in early 2002 and patented in Japan on May 21, 2003, under 1208488 and in Germany on December 4, 2003. A final design prototype W221 was presented in December 2002 to Autospies journalists at a consumer design clinic, 2.5 years prior to the official production model unveiling in June 2005.

Inside, the W221's interior is also significantly different from the preceding model, even more dominated by leather, wood and metal. Where the W220 still had a fair amount of plastic fascias and switches, the W221 has replaced most of these by more luxurious materials such as wood, leather and metal. The interior features an instrument cluster with two large flat panel screens, one for the hard disk based COMAND system which includes the navigation screen and one replacing the analog speedometer by a graphical representation of it, which can display a range of additional information and can also be replaced by the Night View Assist display. Below the central COMAND screen are silver effect air vents, and a square, analog clock within the vents. Below the vents are metal tab switches with a black field behind them, to control the HVAC system (these functions are all also accessible via the COMAND system, which also offers access to some additional HVAC functions, such as foot-well temperature settings and air flow control).

Below the HVAC button section is a panel that opens to give access to the DVD changer which also includes a CompactFlash card reader. On the center console, a metal control wheel for the COMAND system sits above a piece of wood, surrounded by metal buttons. There is no longer a central gear shift lever as in previous models, instead a stalk on the steering wheel controls the gearbox (with buttons or, optionally, paddles on the steering wheel for manual gear control). Controls mounted on the door panels provide access to the main seat controls (including the optional seat heating, seat ventilation and memories) and to the electrical mirrors, windows and boot lid opening and closing. Additional seat controls are accessed via the standard COMAND system (these include controlling the optional multi-contour and dynamic driving seats and the massaging seat functions). Throughout the interior, many buttons are metal, with black fields above them denoting the switches' function.

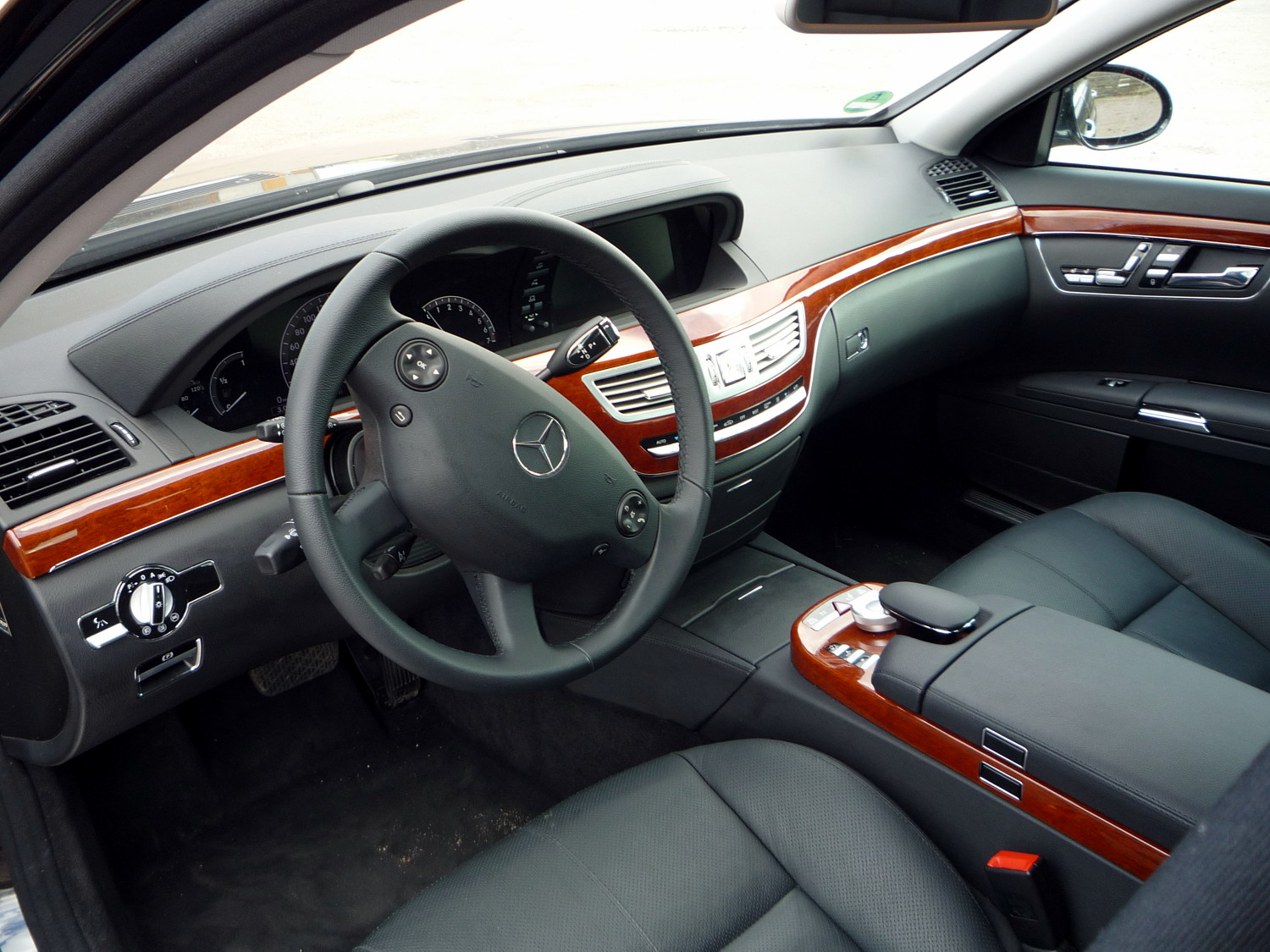
Interior

The steering wheel has various control buttons for the cluster display, volume and telephone control and for the optional Linguatronic voice control system. On the electrically adjustable steering wheel column are also mounted the gearbox control lever, the stalk for controlling the speedtronic and cruise control functions, the main combination lever that operates the indicators, high beam and windscreen wipers and a stalk to adjust the steering wheel and control the optional heated steering wheel. Controls for the interior lighting and the sun roof or panoramic sun roof are mounted on the roof, near the interior rear-view mirror. This section also includes a compartment for sun glasses.

The W221 is slightly larger in all dimensions than the W220, with a longer wheelbase and more interior room.

The S-Class is available in short-wheelbase form, except in the US, Mexico, Russia, China and Indonesia, where all models are long-wheelbase.

== Features ==
Like all other S-Class generations, the W221 introduced a number of new and improved features and systems. The standard COMAND now also controlled more of these features and/or provided access to additional settings for various functions, including the HVAC system and seat controls.

=== Safety ===
- Electronic Stability Program (ESP): standard on the S-Class since the W220 model and similar to the systems fitted to other Mercedes vehicles, this system measures driver inputs and compares these to the vehicle's path. If these diverge, ESP brakes single wheels selectively to eliminate oversteer (fishtailing) and understeer (plowing), and reduces engine power, if necessary. ESP includes anti-lock braking (ABS) and traction control (ASR) within its wider functions.
- Brake Assist and (for vehicles with the optional Distronic Plus system) Brake Assist Plus: a system that recognises emergency braking and increases the braking force (according to Mercedes-Benz 90% of drivers are too hesitant with the brakes in an emergency). Brake Assist Plus uses the radar to apportion brake pressure based on sensor data and measured distance between the car and vehicles or other objects in front.
- Speedtronic adjustable speed limiter for not exceeding a set speed on roads with speed limits.
- Distronic Plus radar controlled cruise control (optional, standard cruise control on other cars), an evolution of the Distronic system introduced on the W220, which maintains a safe distance to the previous vehicle and now can bring the car to a full stop if necessary.
- Pre-Safe and Pre-Safe Plus for vehicles with Distronic Plus: a development of the previous Pre-Safe system fitted to the W220 S-Class, which uses vehicle-dynamic sensors to predict collisions and trigger precautionary measures to protect the vehicle occupants, the W221's Pre-Safe Plus system also takes into account closing speed, as measured by the vehicle's radar. If a collision appears likely, Pre-Safe closes all windows and the sunroof, moves all passenger's seats and their head restraints to a safer position, and tightens the seatbelts. It also inflates the air chambers in the side bolsters of the optional multi-contour seats and (from 2006) engages Pre-Safe Brakes in order to reduce speed and therefore severity of impact.
- Bi-Xenon headlights with Active Light Function swivelling curve light
- Night View Assist: optional, uses two near-infrared (NIR) illuminators mounted in the headlamp clusters and a camera in the windshield. The infrared beams are picked up by the camera and an image is displayed in the instrument cluster. Mercedes-Benz claims that this system provides the same viewable distance as high-beam headlights, without blinding oncoming motorists.
- Adaptive Brake Lights
- Automatically dimming rear-view mirror and driver's door mirror
- Seat belt pre-tensioners, belt force limiters and automatic belt height adjustment, front and rear

The W221 also contains many other safety features, including front and rear crumple zones, eight dual-stage air bags, anti-lock brakes (ABS), collapsible steering column, and traction control.

=== Suspension and handling ===
- Airmatic – air suspension, an evolution of the suspension system introduced on the W220, using compressed air instead of steel springs to provide a softer ride with better handling characteristics at the same time and adaptive electronic control (known as Adaptive Damping System) to sense road and driving conditions and produce a sportier or softer ride. Airmatic also allows the vehicle to be raised by pressing a button in order to increase ground clearance while lowering the body at higher speeds. Airmatic is the standard suspension system for all S-Class models apart from the S 600, S 63, and S 65 AMG which are all equipped with Active Body Control as standard.
- The hydropneumatic Active Body Control (ABC) system is a more advanced suspension compared to Airmatic, based on steel springs and high pressure hydraulics. It keeps the car level even in fast corners, providing a comfort and sports setting as in the case of Airmatic. Again, the ride height can be increased by pressing a button, increasing ground clearance for driving on difficult terrain or in snow. ABC is standard on the S 600, S 63 and S 65, while optional on all other models except vehicles equipped with 4Matic all wheel drive.
- Tele Aid, uses GPS tracking and cell phone service to provide assistance. It can be used for information, to call for roadside assistance, or to call for help in emergencies. It automatically calls for help if an airbag or seatbelt tensioner deploys. Not available in all markets.

=== Comfort and convenience ===
- Rain-sensing windshield wipers with two sensitivity settings.
- Fully automatic climate control system (HVAC) with pollen and charcoal filters, three different ventilation modes (diffuse, medium and focused), the ability to adjust the foot-well temperature one or two steps warmer or colder than the rest of the vehicle and an optional separate rear-seat climate control.
- Electrically adjustable, Heated and (optionally) Active-Ventilated seats, with heating elements for warming the seats and small fans to keep the seats cool and draw perspiration away from occupants. Seat memories are standard on some models, available as an option on others.
- Speed sensitive parameter steering.
- Electrically adjustable, folding, heated mirrors (with memory on some models).
- An electric park brake replaces the pedal operated system from previous generations.
- Optional Multi-contour seats provide additional control over lumbar, shoulder and side bolster settings in the seats, using air chambers that can be inflated or deflated to better suit the occupant and which are also used to provide a four-mode massaging function.
- Drive-Dynamic seats (which include the Multi-contour seat function) adds a further function to the air chamber control by inflating and deflating them dynamically to support the seat occupant during cornering.
- Electrically operated rear-window shade and rear side window sun shades are optionally available (standard on some models).
- Optional comfort head restraints are not just adjustable in height and angle, but also feature adjustable side bolsters.
- Self-closing doors and boot-lid are standard on some models, optionally available on others. There is also an option for a powered boot lid which closes at the touch of a button.
- Keyless Go, an optional smart key entry and startup system.
- Optional fiber-optic ambient lighting package for the dashboard, doors, footwells, and other areas.
- A range of parking systems are available, depending on model and model year. Parktronic is an ultrasound parking aid with visual and audible signals. A rear-view camera is available as an option and models with Distronic Plus offer radar based parking assistance (Parking Assist, Advanced Parking Guidance).
- Bi-xenon headlamps with Headlamp Assist (automatic activation when dark) and optional Active Light System with cornering function.
- Electrically folding rear head restraints.
- Leather upholstery.
- Electrically adjustable steering column with easy entry function.
- Infrared reflecting glass (noise insulating glass).
- Long wheel base models (with an 'L' in the model name) have electrically adjustable rear seats (optional on other models) and the front passenger seat can be adjusted from the rear.
- A garage door opener integrated in the interior rear view mirror is also available.
- A tyre pressure warning system is standard, optionally a tire-pressure monitoring system that displays the exact tyre pressure and warns the driver of any punctures is available.

=== Multimedia ===
- A new hard disk based COMAND system is standard on the W221. Compared to the W220 COMAND it is even further integrated and provides access to more functions than before. The COMAND controller is now larger, includes haptic feedback and is installed prominently on the centre console. The Hi-Res 8" main TFT colour COMAND display screen is mounted higher and more directly into the driver's line of sight. The brightness and tilt of this screen can also be adjusted. In addition to the GPS navigation system, COMAND also offers command and control over the radio, CD/DVD, video, address book and telephone functions and can be used to control many other vehicle and equipment settings (including multi-contour seats, rear window shade and the HVAC system). There is also a "favourite" button to which one can assign a frequently used function.
- There are also dedicated shortcut switches on the centre console to control some other frequently used functions, such as switching between radio, music, navigation and telephone, seat settings and volume control.
- There is an in-dash DVD (and CD) changer and PCMCIA card reader.
- A digital TV tuner can be optionally installed.
- An optional harman/kardon Logic7 stereo sound system with 14 speakers and a 600W 13-channel DSP amplifier, supporting Dolby Digital 5.1 and Digital Theatre System (DTS) sound processing.
- Also available is a factory fitted rear seat entertainment package, which provides two screens for rear passengers, a separate DVD drive in the rear and two sets of headphones. This also comes with COMAND style rotary controller and additional buttons mounted on the center arm rest in the rear.
- Linguatronic voice command and control is available as an option and includes more functions than on the W220, including voice entry of navigation destination.

== Models ==
=== 2009 facelift ===
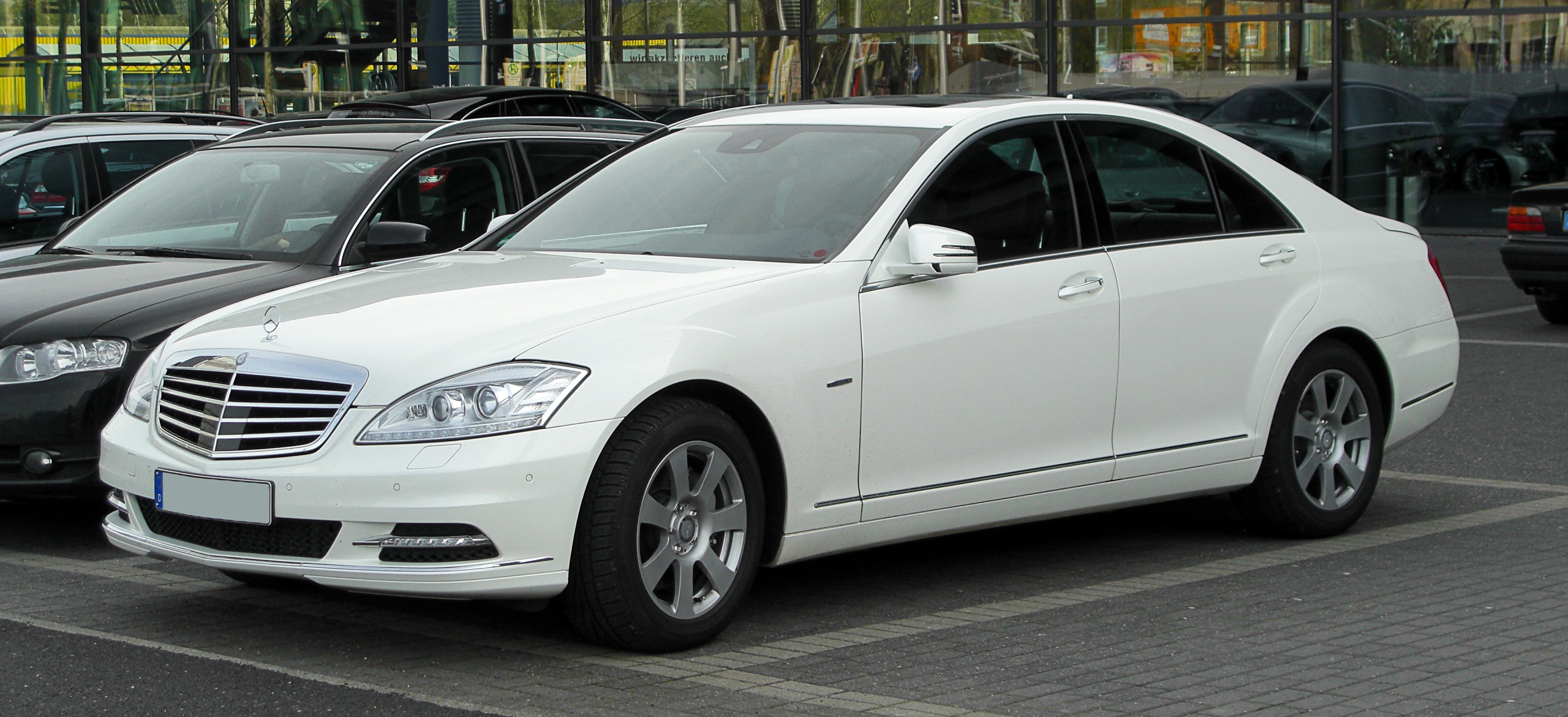

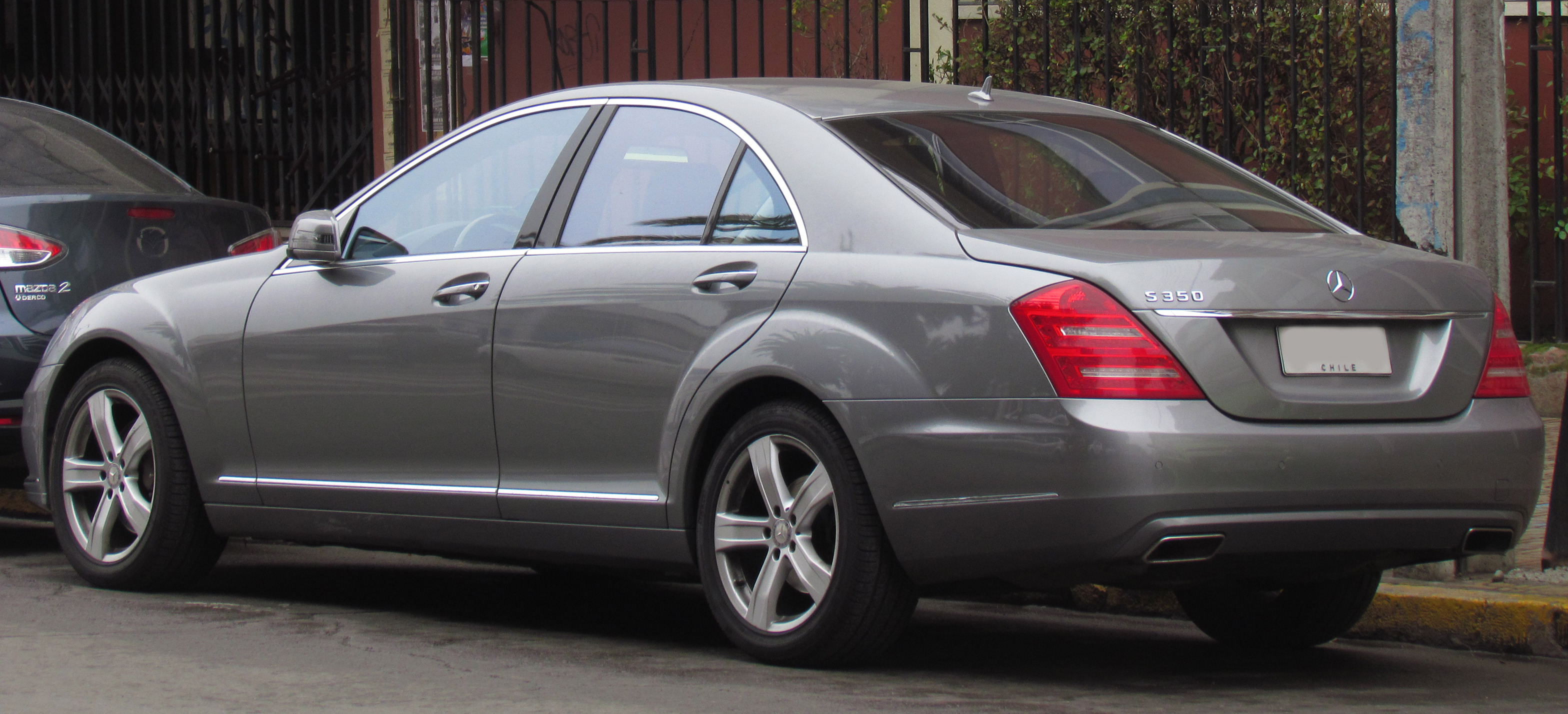
2009 facelift

Development to further refine the W221 started in 2006 with these design changes being approved in early 2007. The revised 2010 S-Class was announced on April 8, 2009, at Stuttgart. The minor model update includes minor cosmetic changes and several new features:

- Adaptive Highbeam Assist – detects vehicles with their lights on which are travelling towards or ahead of the car in which the system is fitted and controls the headlamps to ensure the largest possible range without dazzling other drivers.
- Blind Spot Assist – warning indicator on side mirror activates if vehicle detected in blind spot.
- Lane Keeping Assist – detects road markings and senses if the driver is inadvertently straying out of the lane. If so, the driver is warned by short vibrations of the steering wheel. This system can also distinguish between intentional (for example, overtaking or merging) and unintentional lane departures, reducing the number of false alarms.
- Speed Limit Assist – identifies speed limit signs in passing and shows the relevant speed limit in the central display. It is standard for S 600.
- Attention Assist – continuously monitors more than 70 different parameters to detect driver fatigue and tiredness. Once the system detects behaviour that typically indicates the onset of drowsiness, a warning signal is sounded and "ATTENTION ASSIST. Break!" appears in the instrument cluster. It is not standard on the S 400 HYBRID.
- Active Body Control (ABC) crosswind stabilization – uses the sensors of the Electronic Stability Program (ESP) to vary the wheel load distribution via the ABC spring struts, depending on the direction and intensity of the crosswind, in order to reduce the adverse effects of crosswinds. This is standard on the S 600.
- Torque Vectoring Brake – brakes the inside rear wheel during cornering to enhance handling and safety by reducing understeer.
- PRE-SAFE Brake upgrade now activates maximum braking pressure around 0.6 seconds before what it recognises as an unavoidable collision.
- Night View Assist Plus with pedestrian recognition
- COMAND with SPLITVIEW dual view display.
- COMAND APS navigation system replaces DVD with 40 gigabyte hard-disk drive map.
- Direct-Steer

=== Equipment ===
- standard AIRMATIC air suspension with continuously Adaptive Damping System Plus (not for S 600 and AMG)
- Active Body Control suspension (optional, only on rear-wheel drive)
- Nine airbags as standard
- ESP Dynamic Cornering Assist
- Traffic Sign Assist with Speed Limit Assist
- ATTENTION ASSIST (as standard)
- ADAPTIVE BRAKE (as standard)
- DISTRONIC PLUS
- Brake Assist system BAS PLUS
- NECK-PRO crash-responsive head restraints
- PRE-SAFE, PRE-SAFE Brake
- Active bonnet
- Active Lane Keeping Assist
- Bi-Xenon headlamps with Intelligent Light System and Adaptive Highbeam Assist
- Night View Assist PLUS
- Active Parking Assist
- Active Blind Spot Assist
- Crosswind Assist
- Torque Vectoring Brake
- Backup camera
- Electric parking brake with emergency braking function
- Direct-Steer Electromechanical steering with Steer Assist electromechanical steering power assistance

The updated models went on sale in June 2009. Early models included: S 350 CDI BlueEFFICIENCY, S 450 CDI, S 350, S 400 HYBRID, S 450, S 500, S 600.

=== S 280 and S 300L (2006–2013) ===
The S 300L (only available in long wheelbase form) was exclusive to some Asian markets, including Singapore and Malaysia. In 2007, the retail price was S$292,888 in Singapore ($190k, all cars are extremely expensive in Singapore); in December 2013, at the end of the W221's life cycle, it was sold at RM657,218 in Malaysia.

The S 280 was sold in other markets like the United Kingdom, Pakistan, and the United Arab Emirates. It appears to be a short wheelbase version of the S 300L with no other significant differences.

=== S 320 CDI BlueEFFICIENCY (2008–2009) ===
It is a replacement of S 320 CDI with improved fuel efficiency. Changes include: on-demand electric hydraulic power steering pump, standstill decoupling for the 7G-TRONIC automatic transmission, and 17-inch light-alloy wheels with reduced rolling resistance tyres.

The German model has an MSRP of €70,864.50 (incl. VAT) for the short-wheelbase version, €78,718.50 (incl. VAT) for long-wheelbase version.

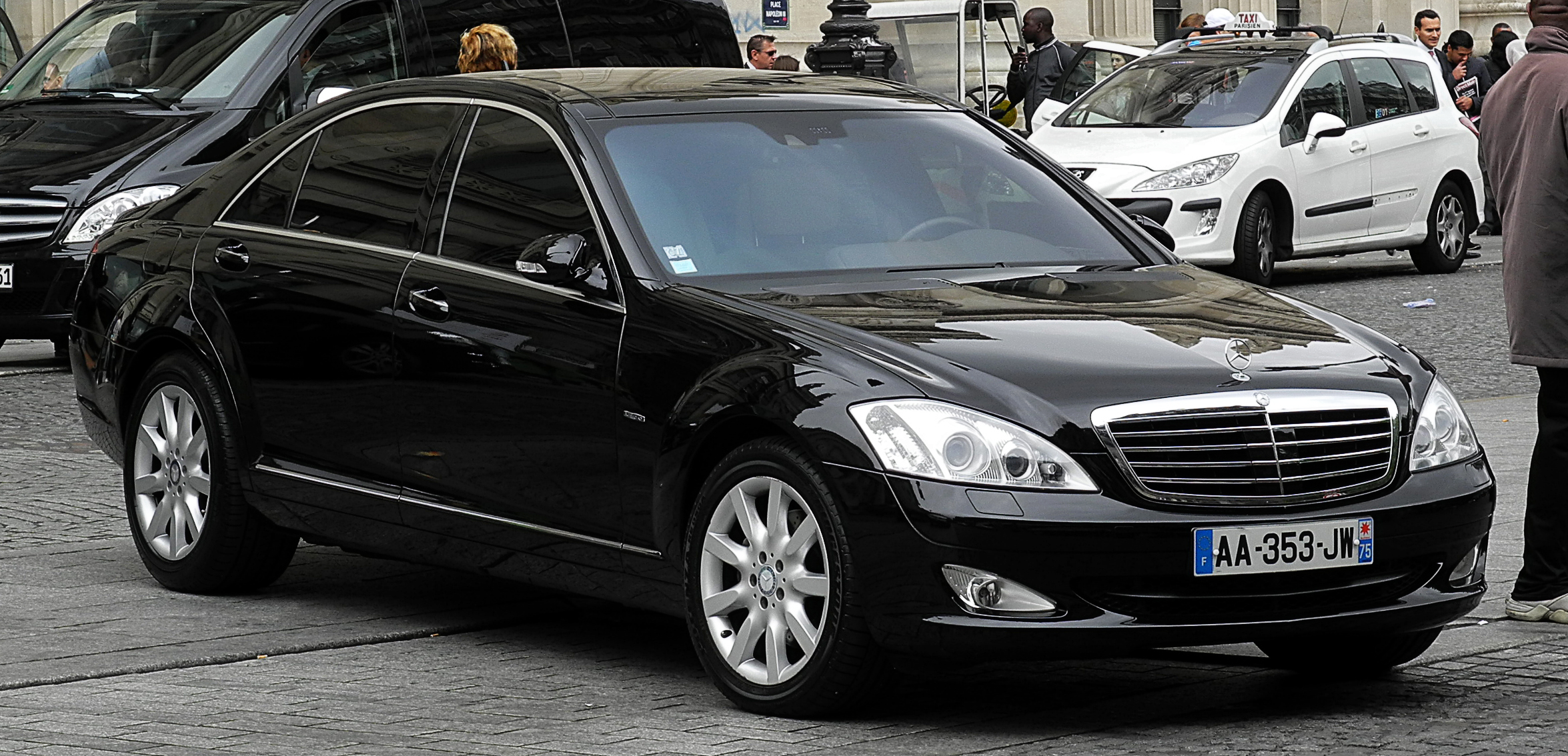
Mercedes-Benz S 320 CDI BlueEFFICIENCY (France)

=== S 400 Hybrid (2009–2013) ===
The S 400 BlueHybrid is a mild hybrid and the first hybrid car to adopt a lithium-ion battery. The battery pack was supplied by Continental AG and the cells were provided by Johnson Controls-Saft. The S 400 BlueHybrid was unveiled at the 2009 Chicago Auto Show. US models went on sale in August 2009, but were delivered to dealers in 2009–10. Japan models went on sale in October 2009.

The 3.5 liter V6 engine in the vehicle, combined with the hybrid system, develops 295 hp (220 kW) and 284 lb⋅ft (385 N⋅m) of torque. It gets 19 miles per US gallon (12 L/100 km; 23 mpg_{‑imp}) in the city and 26 miles per US gallon (9.0 L/100 km; 31 mpg_{‑imp}) on the highway.

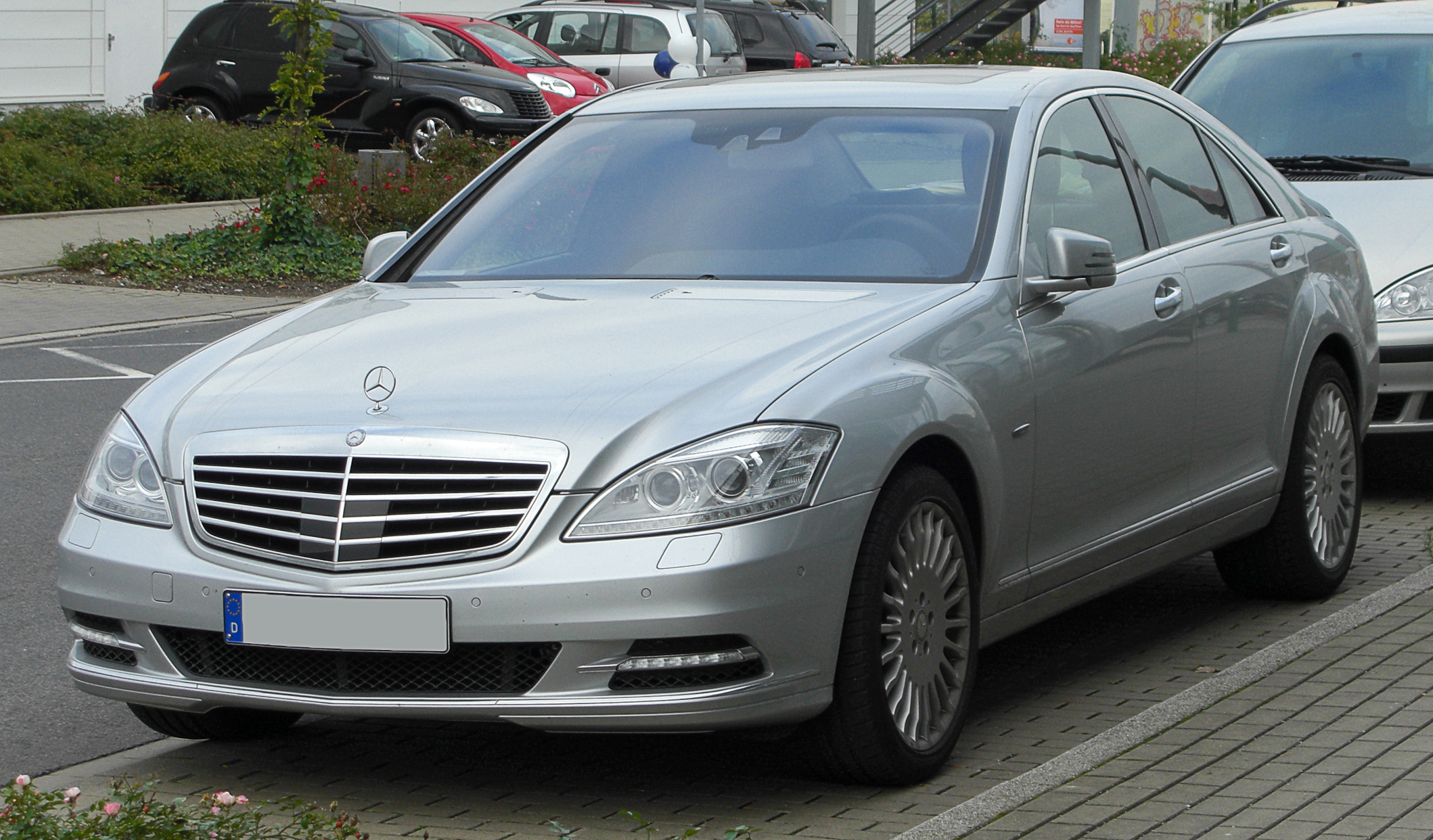
2010 Mercedes-Benz S 400 BlueHybrid (Europe)

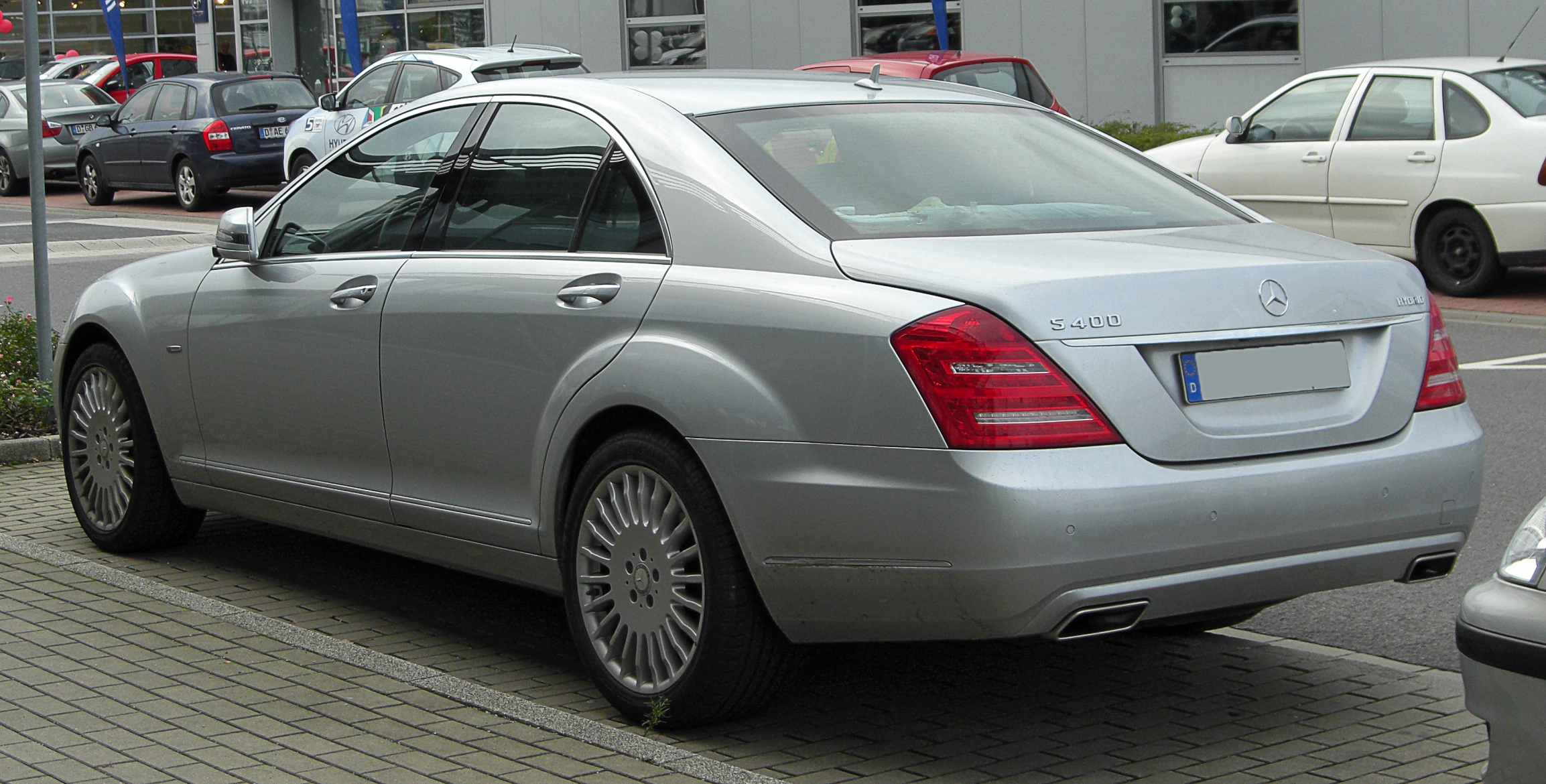
2010 Mercedes-Benz S 400 BlueHybrid (Europe)

==== ESF 2009 Experimental Safety Vehicle (2009) ====
The ESF 2009 Experimental Safety Vehicle is a safety research vehicle based on the S 400 Hybrid.

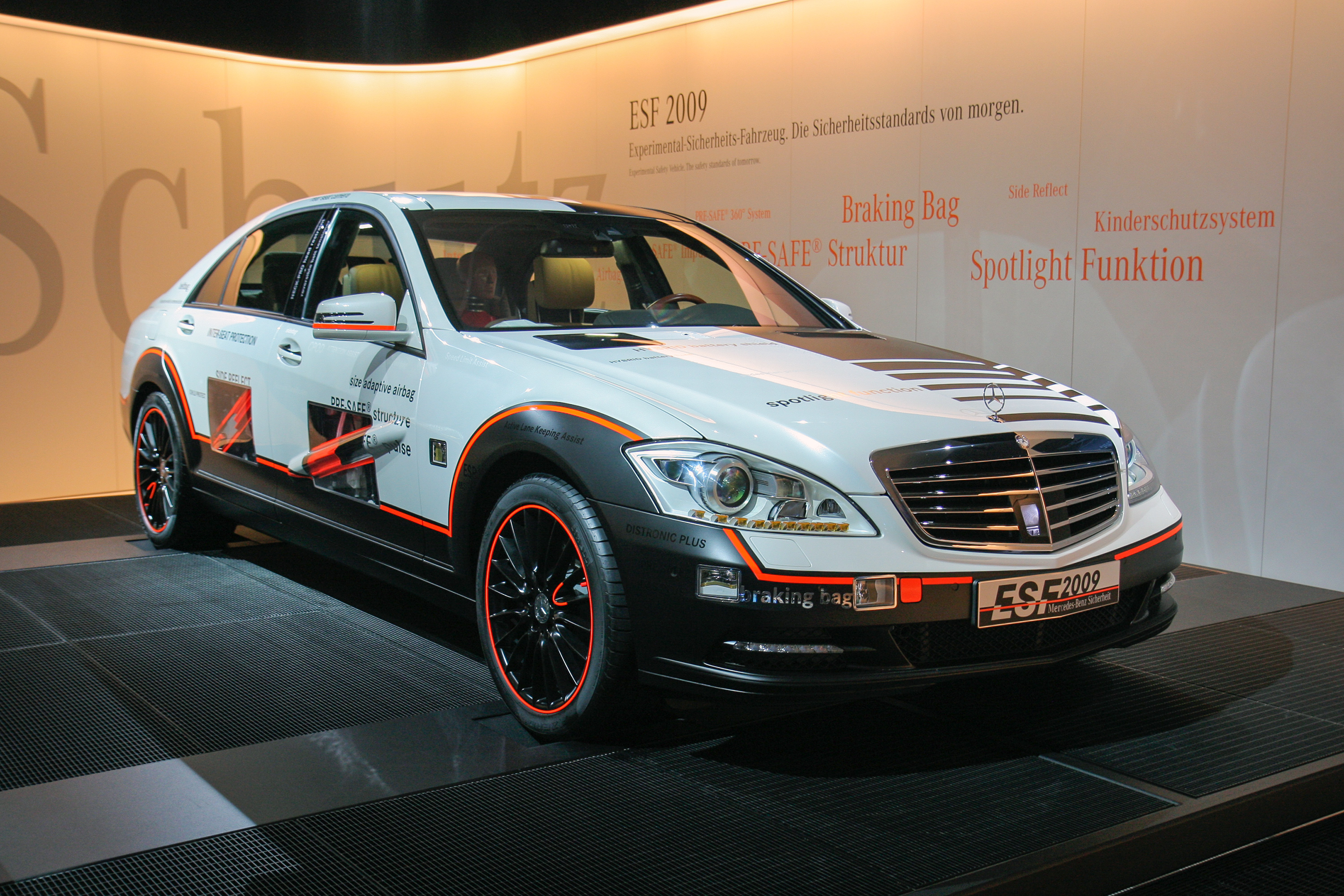
ESF 2009 Experimental Safety Vehicle based on Mercedes-Benz S 400 Hybrid (V221)

=== S 420 CDI (2006–2009) ===
The vehicles were delivered beginning in December 2006, with MSRP of short-wheelbase model at €84,448 (net price €72,800) and the long-wheelbase model at €92,104 (net price €79,400).

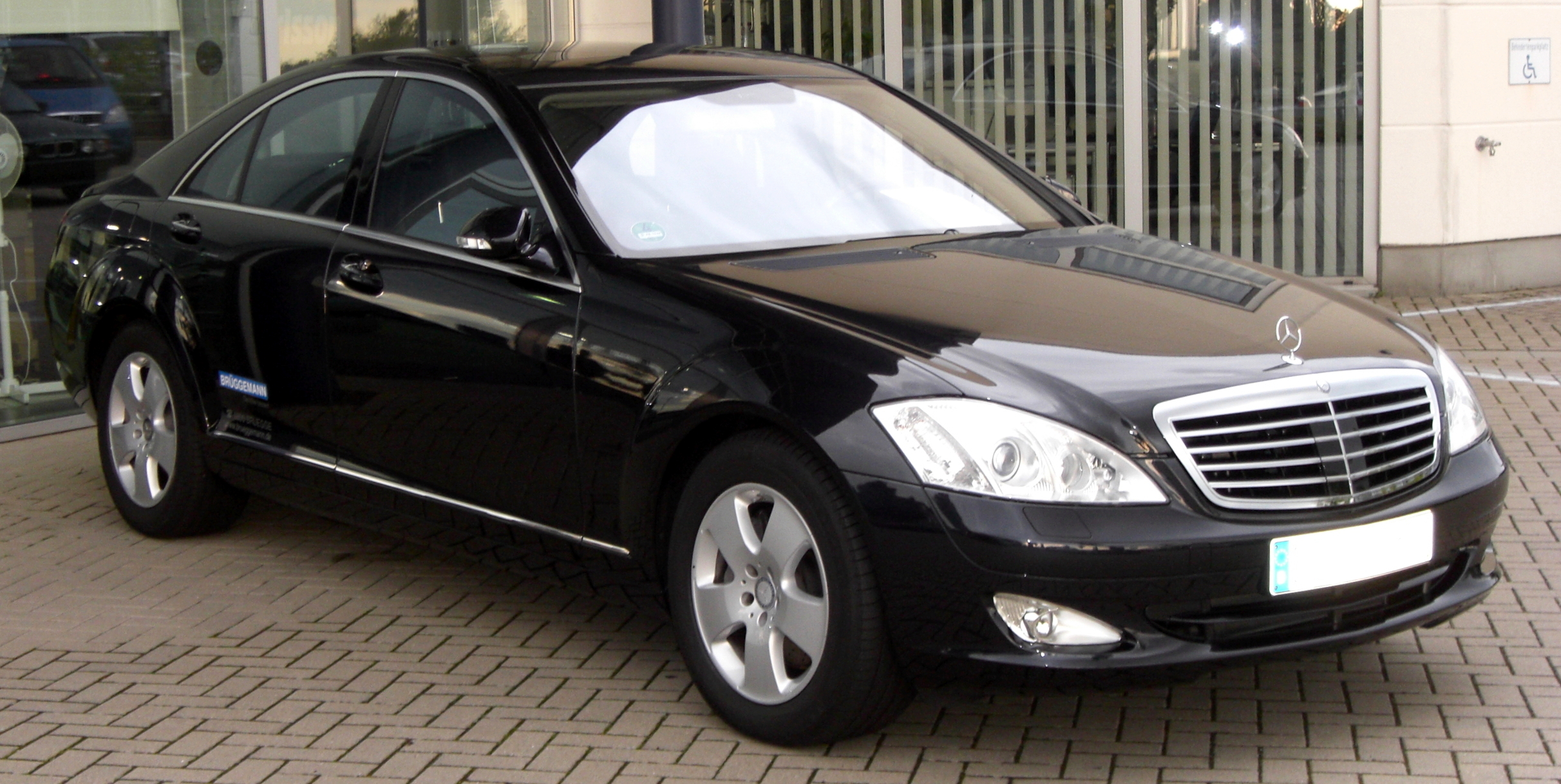
Mercedes-Benz S 420 CDI (Europe)

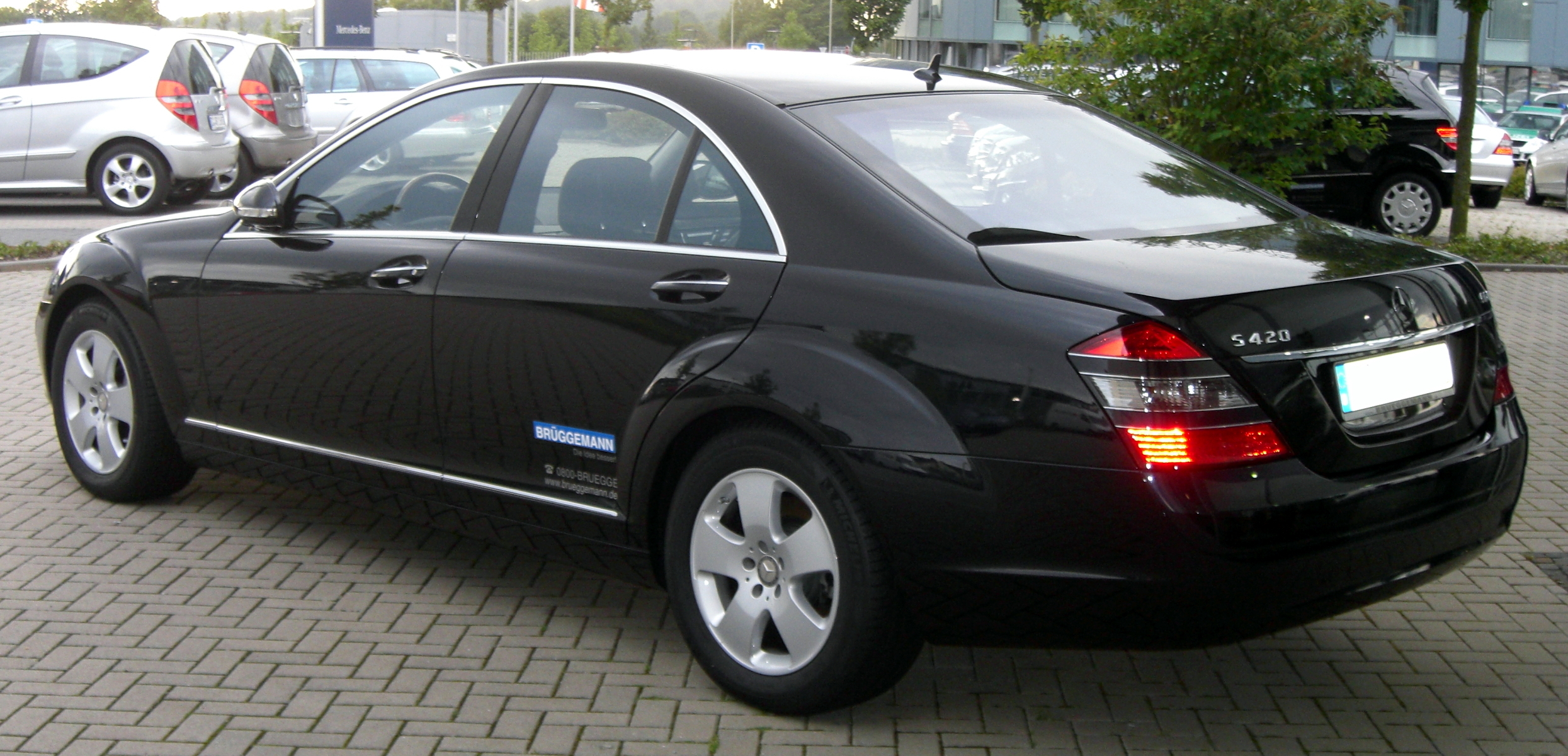
Mercedes-Benz S 420 CDI (Europe)

=== S 450 CDI (2009–2010) ===
The V8 diesel was updated to offer more power (320 hp (239 kW)) while reducing emissions and fuel consumption. In spite of same displacement, the model designation is S 450 CDI.

The V8 diesel motors were dropped for the model year 2011 because of more powerful V6 diesel motors and because of low demand.

=== S 600 Guard (2006–2013) ===
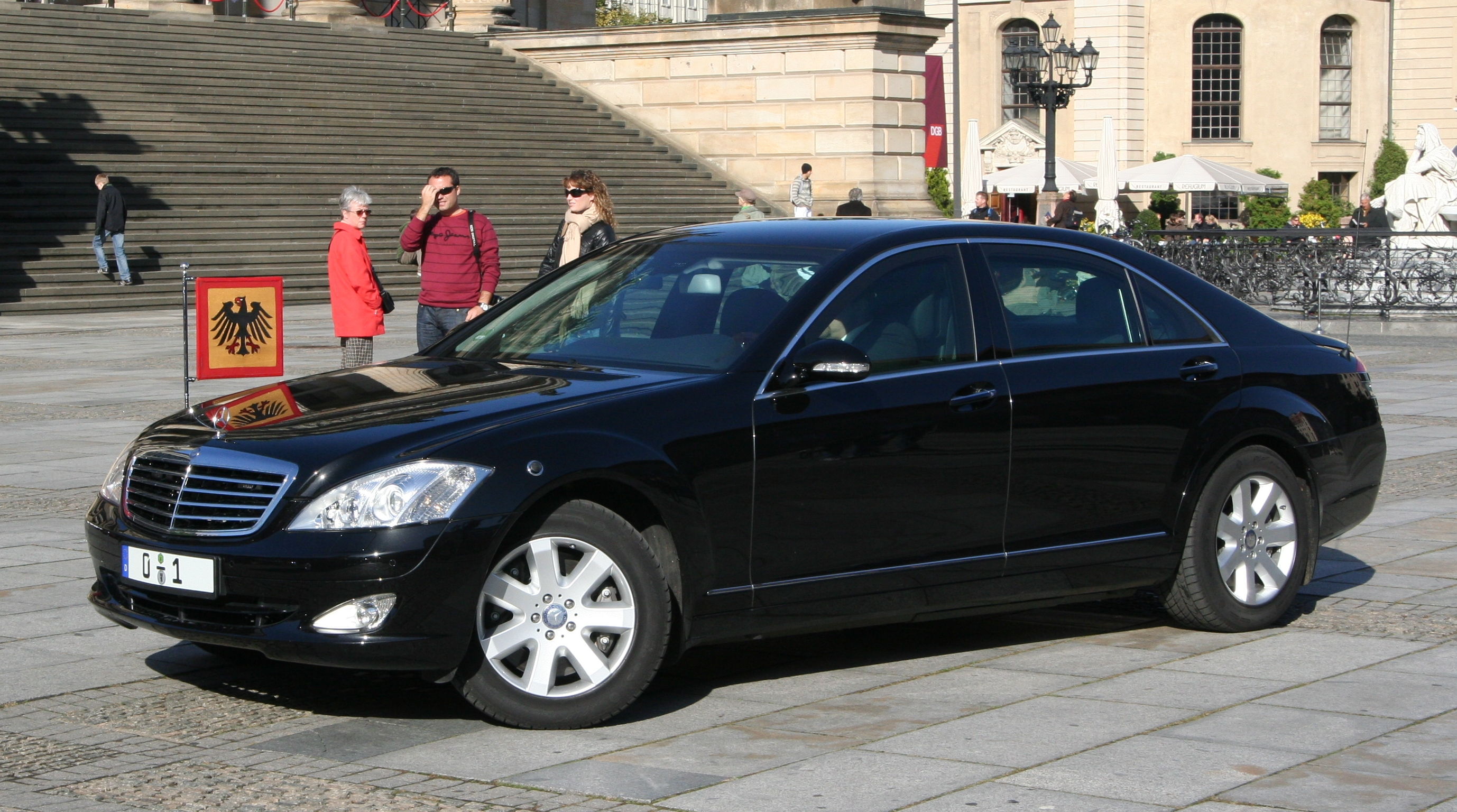
S 600 Guard, in use by the President of Germany

The S 600 Guard is an armoured vehicle with European B6/B7 resistance level. It resists military-standard small-arms projectiles and provides protection against fragments from hand grenades and other explosive charges. Additional safety features include run-flat tyres, 90L self-sealing fuel tank and a fire-extinguishing system. Other features include Michelin PAX 245–700 R470 AC tires, optional emergency fresh-air system, pneumatic emergency control system for the power windows (operates independently of the on-board electronics), emergency boot opening facility, optional Panic Alarm System, rear camera, heated front windscreen and heated front windows, adjustable doorhold system for all four doors, rear doors that are pulled shut automatically over the last few millimetres, and rear electric roller blinds. The vehicle has top speed of 210 km/h (130 mph), with GVW of 4,200 kg (9,300 lb).

=== S 600 Pullman Guard (2008–2013) ===
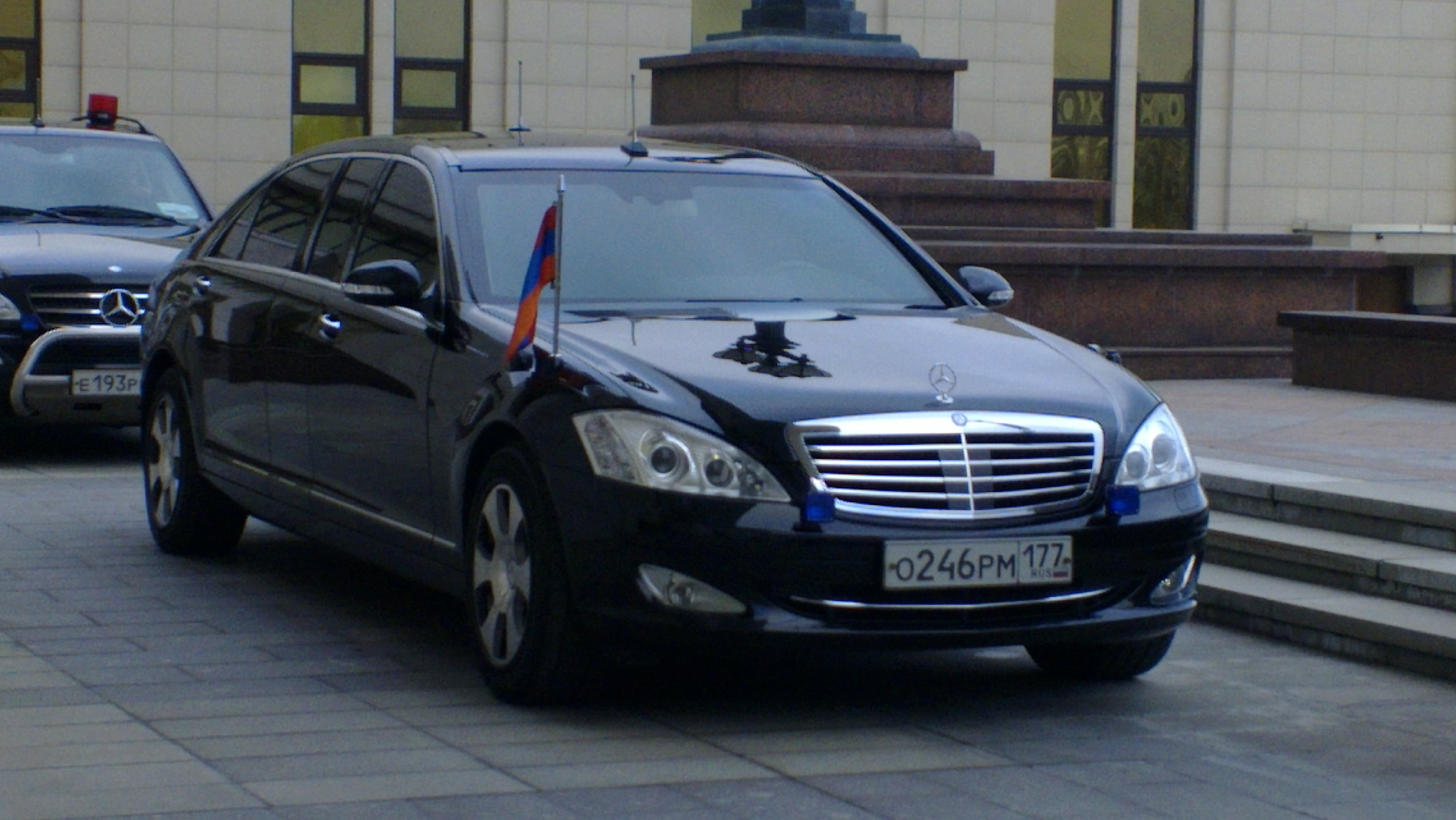
Most likely non-factory built armoured stretched Mercedes-Benz S 600, in use by President of Armenia on a Moscow visit

The S600 Pullman Guard is based on the Mercedes Benz S 600 L Guard, but in limousine form with an extra-long wheelbase. It includes a rear entrance with increased headroom and 4 seats behind the driver partition. Other features include reinforcement of the links between the suspension components and the bodyshell, specifically targeted modification of the suspension components themselves, an additional brace (strut tower brace) between the front suspension struts, two additional steel springs at the rear to complement the air suspension, and larger twin-calliper front brake discs.

The vehicles were delivered beginning in late 2008 (the first one in early part of the year for the inauguration of new Russian president Dmitry Medvedev). The production launch marked the 80th anniversary of the Mercedes-Benz special-protection unit. The President of India travels in a black Mercedes-Benz S-Class (S 600) Pullman Guard, which is stretched to limousine form and the limousine has a longer wheelbase.

=== S 63 AMG and S 65 AMG ===
The S 63 AMG is powered by the Mercedes-Benz M156 V8 engine rated at 525 PS (386 kW; 518 hp) and 630 N⋅m (465 lbf⋅ft) of torque. It can accelerate from 0–100 km/h (0–62 mph) in 4.6 seconds and has a top speed limited to 250 km/h (155 mph).

The S 63 AMG has an aluminum and steel body with 19" light-alloy multispoke wheels in the front and back, fitted with 255/40 tires in front, and 275/40 tires in the rear, and covered with a high-sheen finish. The S 63 w feature LED turn signals in front, and in the back, 52 LEDS form a "C" on both tail lights.

The S 65 AMG is powered by the Mercedes-Benz M275 V12 engine rated at 612 PS (450 kW; 604 hp) or 630 PS (460 kW; 620 hp) (on facelift version after 2010) and 1,000 N⋅m (738 lbf⋅ft) of torque. It includes restyled front and rear bumpers and rocker panels, larger wheels, brakes, and tires, four exhaust pipes, modified and reprogrammed suspension for sport biased handling, and various interior changes. Apart from the higher output engine, many of the AMG modifications give the S 65 AMG a distinctly different character than the S 600 base V12 model. The S65 continues to use the 5 speed transmission, because it can handle the higher torque of the engine, as opposed to the 7-speed transmission.

The vehicles were unveiled at the 2006 Detroit Motor Show.

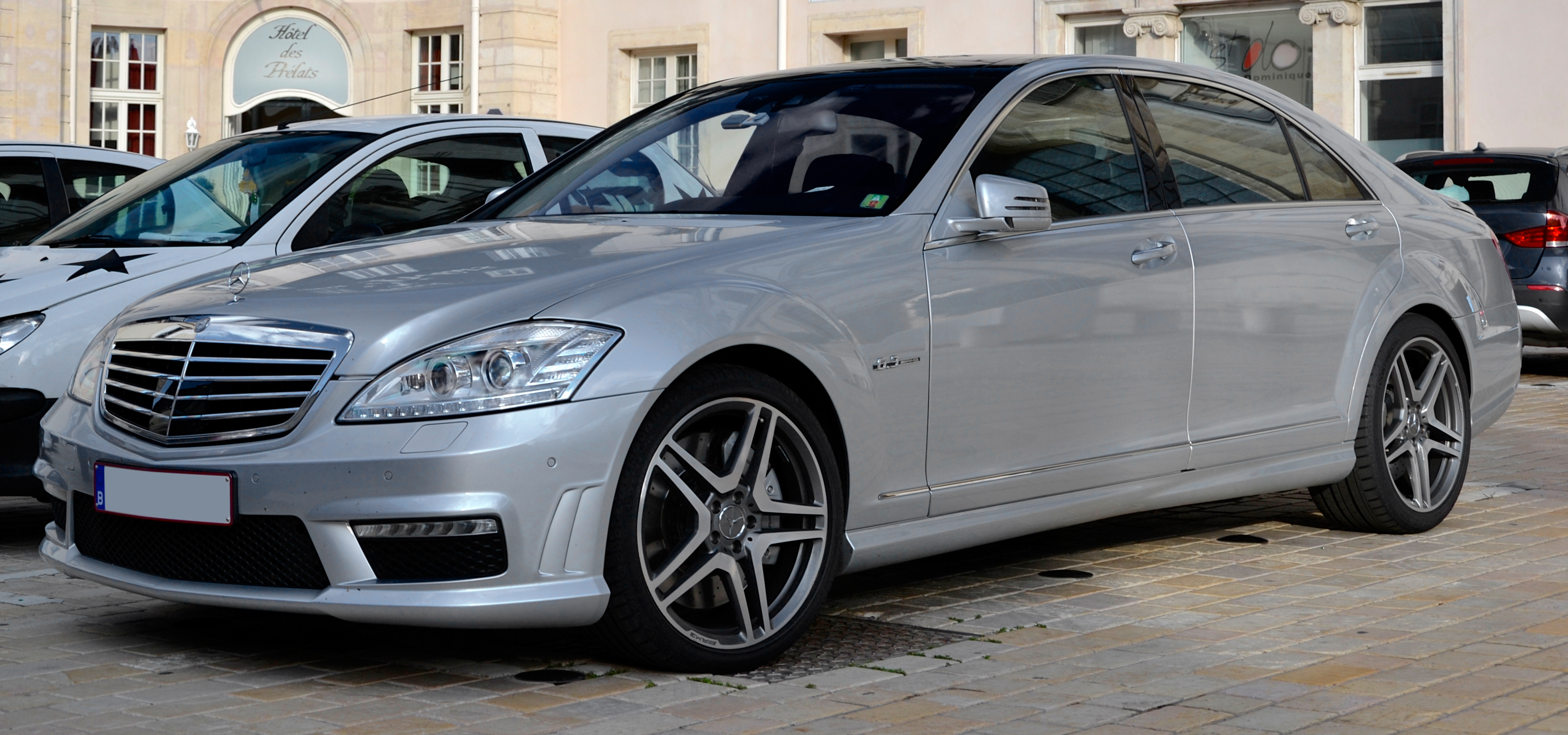
Mercedes-Benz S 63 AMG (Europe)

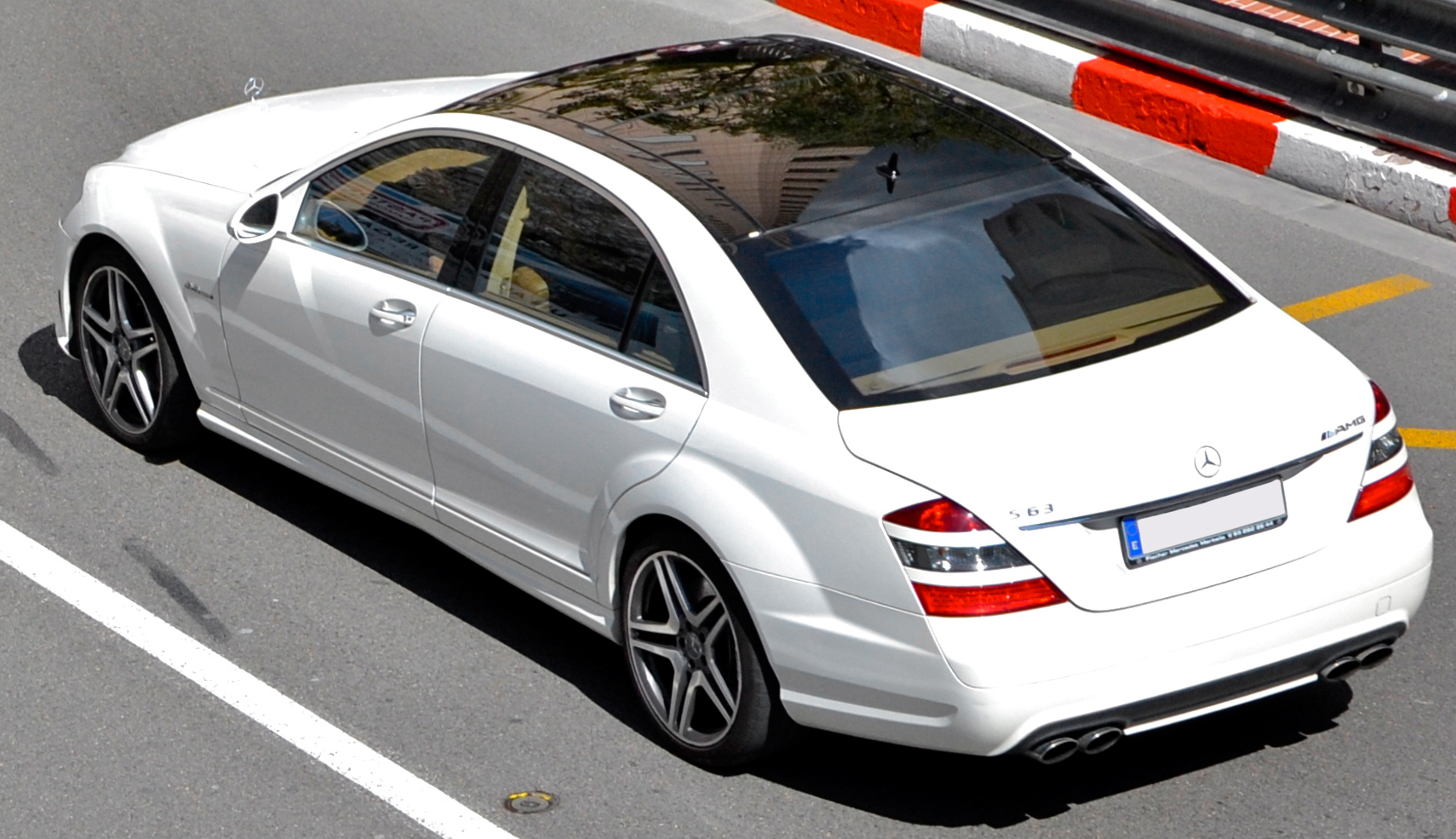
Mercedes-Benz S 63 AMG (Europe)

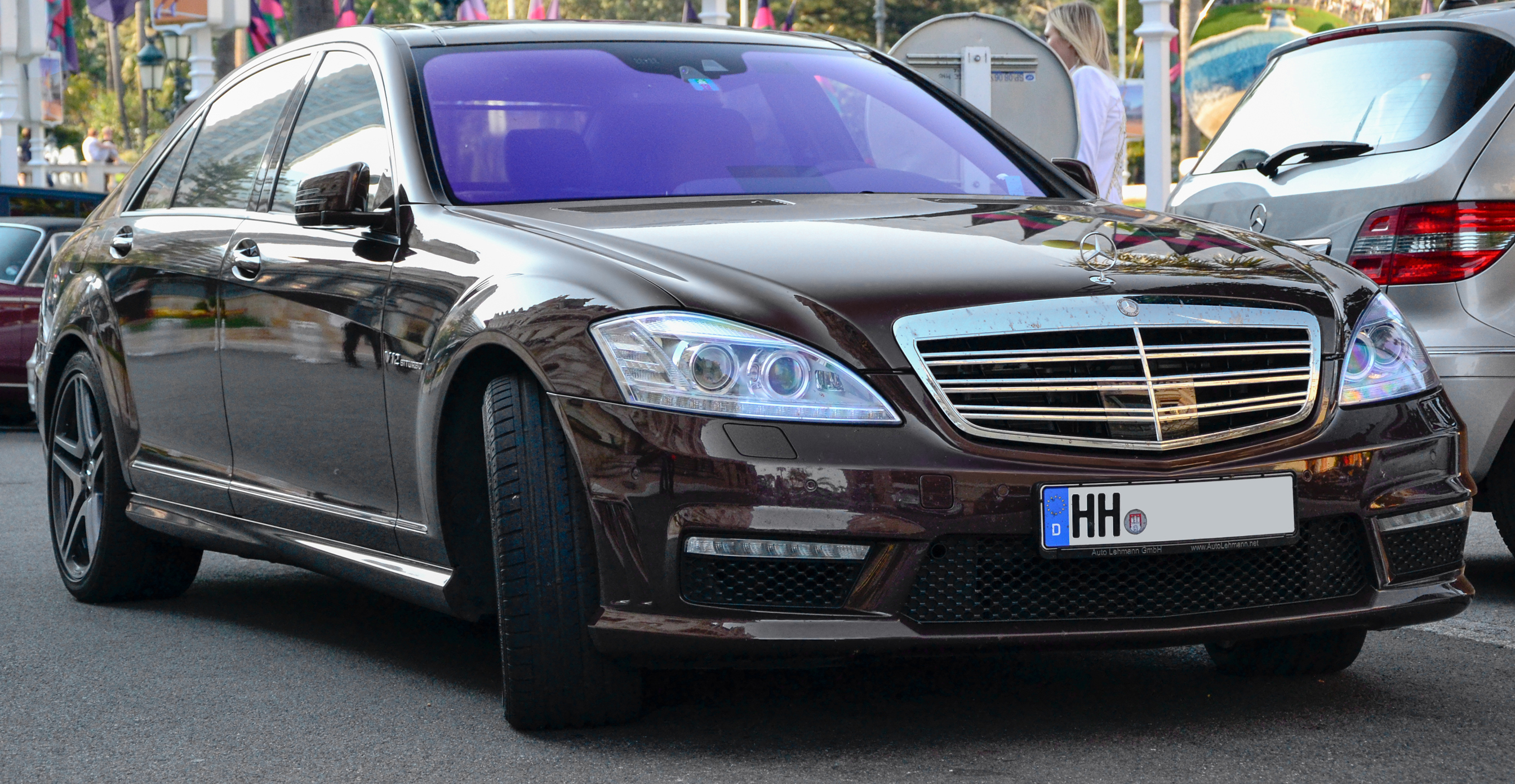
Mercedes-Benz S 65 AMG (Europe)

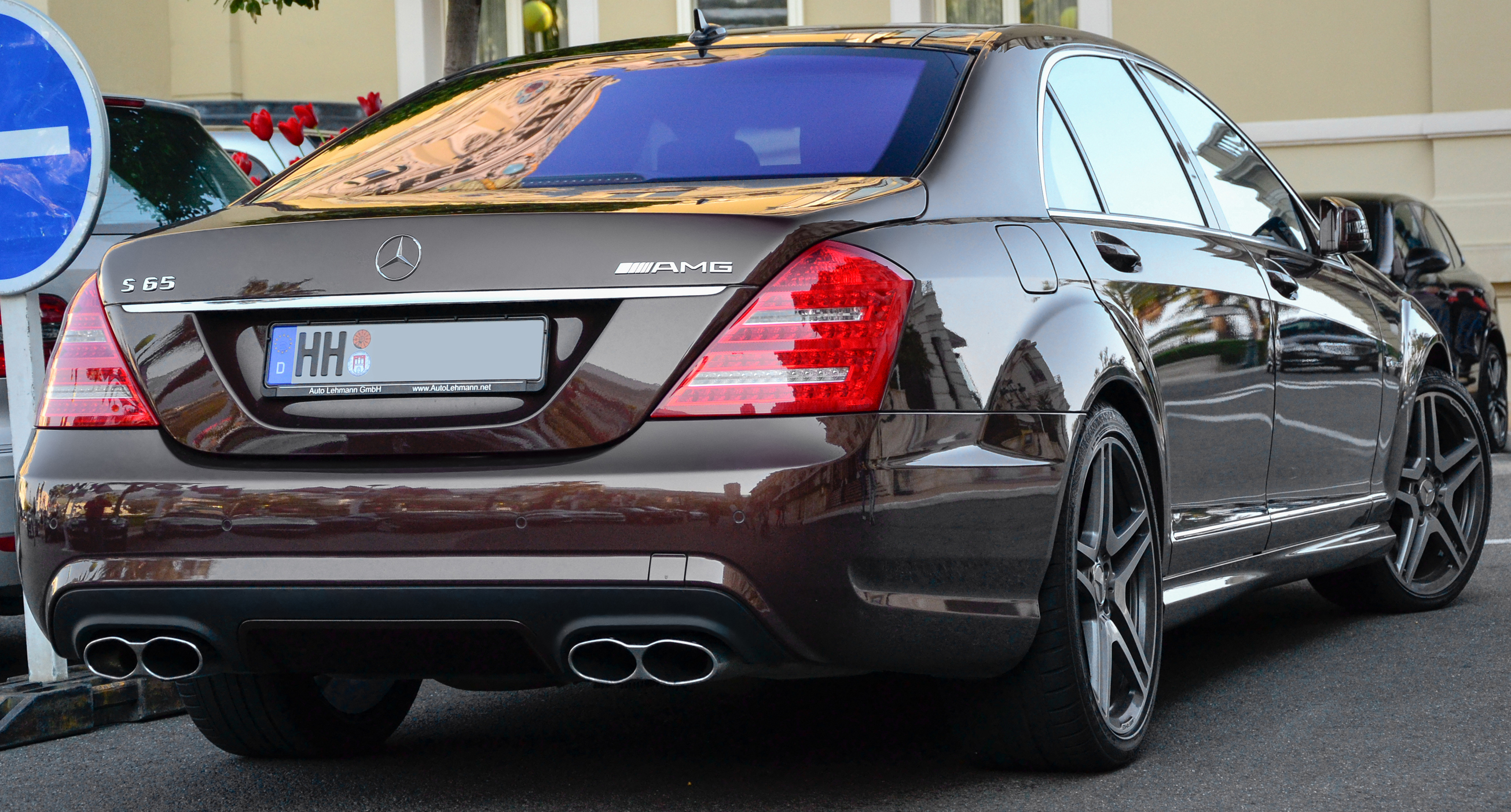
Mercedes-Benz S 65 AMG (Europe)

=== S 250 CDI (2011–2013) ===
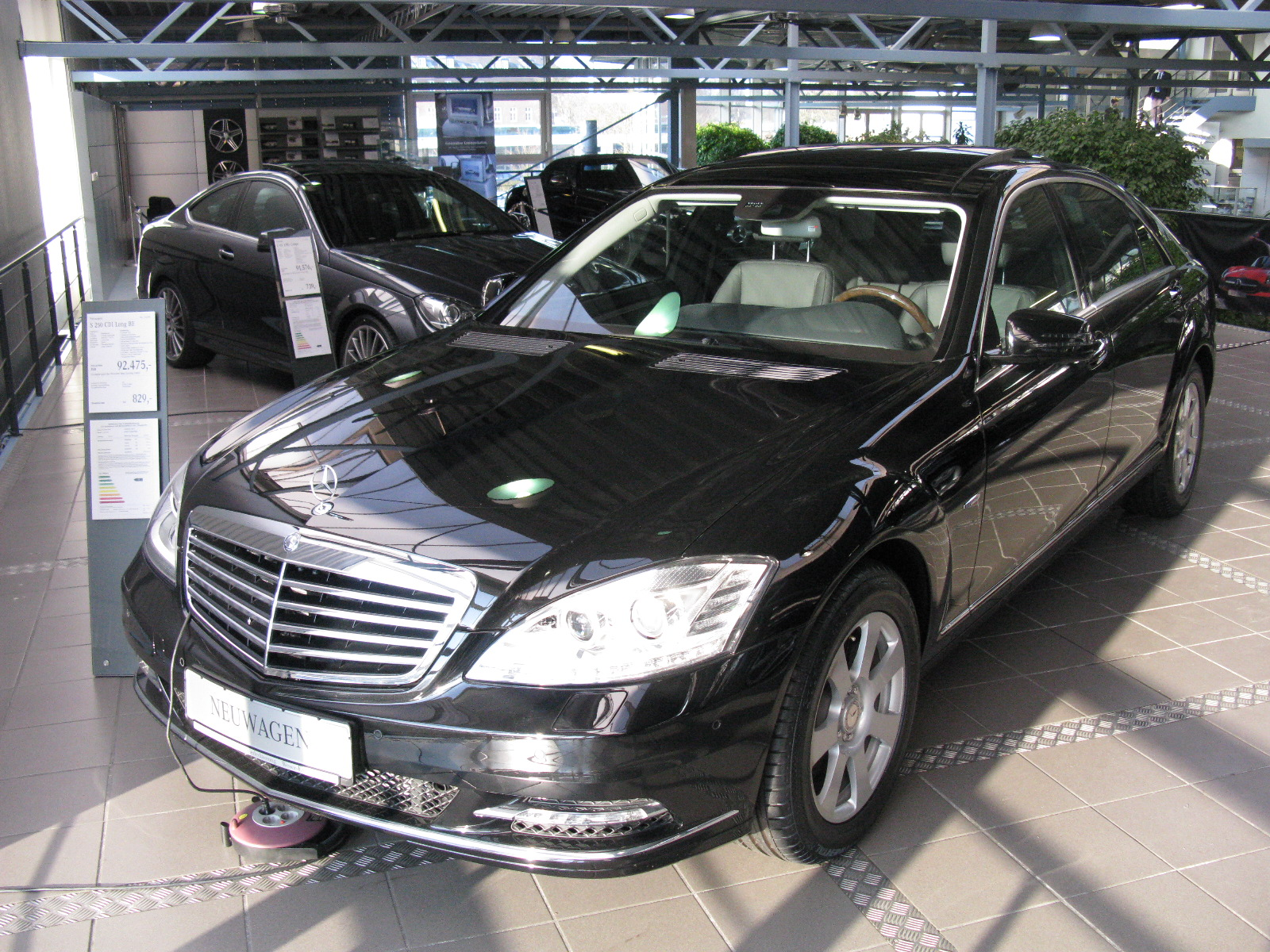
Mercedes-Benz S 250 CDI

Mercedes unveiled the S 250 CDI at the Paris Motor Show. The car is powered by a four-cylinder diesel engine which produces 150 kW (201 hp; 204 PS) and 500 N⋅m (369 lb⋅ft) of torque. The S 250 accelerates from 0–100 km/h (0–62 mph) in 8.2 seconds and can reach a top speed of 240 km/h (149 mph). Fuel consumption is 5.7 liters per 100 kilometers (41.2 mpg US), while CO_{2} emissions are 149 g/km. The engine has two turbos, and turns off when stopped.

The Mercedes-Benz S 250 CDI BlueEFFICIENCY won the 2012 World Green Car of the Year.

=== S 350 BlueTEC & S 350 BlueTEC 4 Matic (2011–2013) ===
Mercedes unveiled the S350 BlueTEC in late 2011. The car is powered by a V6 diesel engine with 258 hp (192 kW) and 620 N⋅m (457 lb⋅ft) of torque. The car also received Start&Stop functionality and the AdBlue system. Based on this engine, the car was approved for EURO 6 norm. This engine was also used in the successor to the W221, the Mercedes-Benz W222. From 2011 onwards the S Class W221 received optional equipment: "Sport-Paket AMG" which added sportier look, bigger brakes and new types of alloy wheel options.

=== Mercedes-Benz Concept Ocean Drive (2007) ===
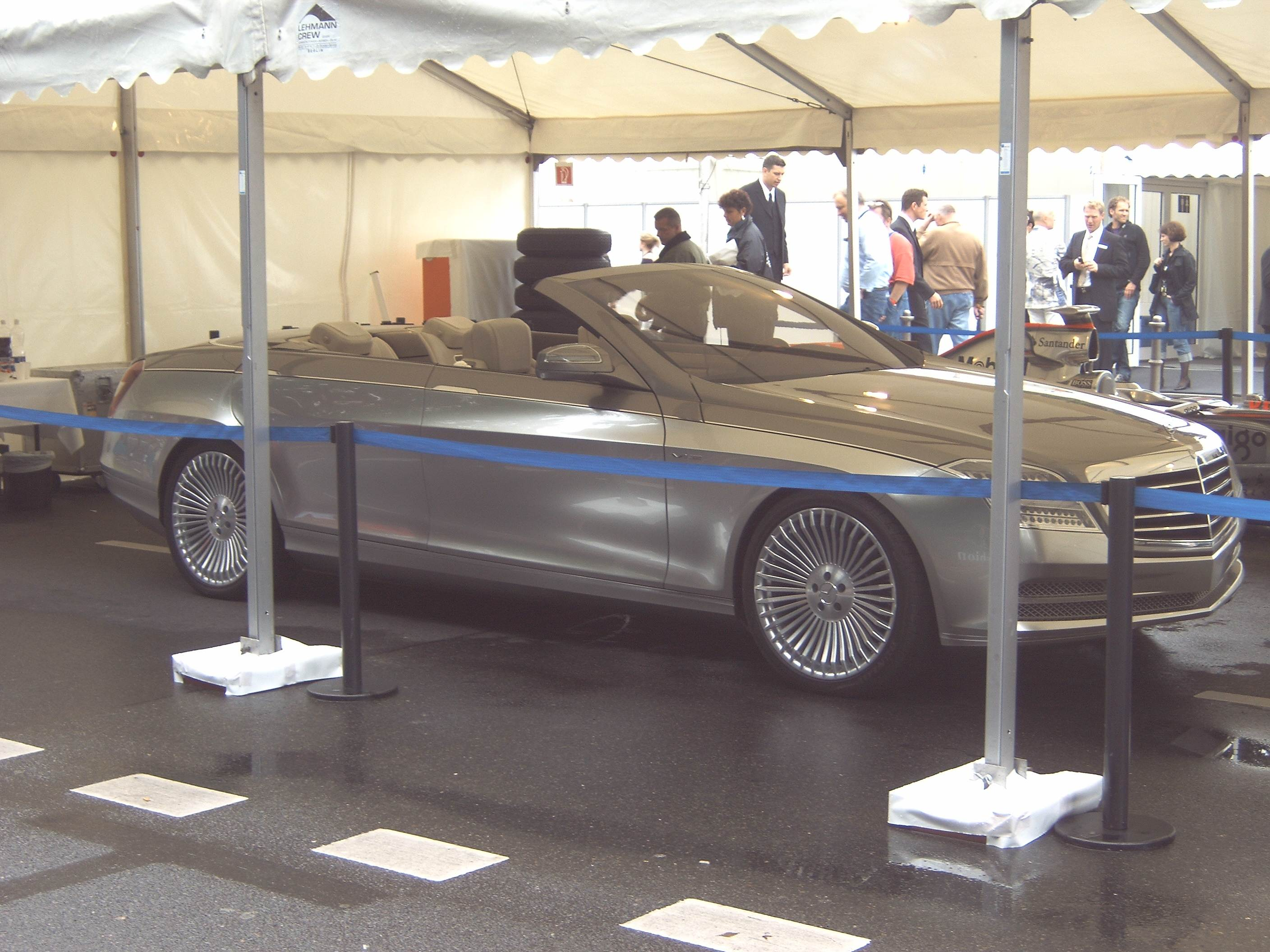
Ocean Drive Concept

It was unveiled at the 2007 North American International Auto Show.

The features include aluminum wheels with 275/35ZR21 tires.

== Specifications ==
=== Engines ===
Model	Years	Engine type/code	Power, Torque at rpm
Petrol engines
S 280 / S 300	2007–2013	2,997 cc (2.997 L; 182.9 cu in) V6 (M272)	231 PS (170 kW; 228 hp) at 6,000, 300 N⋅m (221 lbf⋅ft) at 2,400–5,000
S 350	2005–2011	3,498 cc (3.498 L; 213.5 cu in) V6 (M272)	272 PS (200 kW; 268 hp) at 6,000, 350 N⋅m (258 lbf⋅ft) at 2,400–5,000
S 350 BlueEFFICIENCY	2011–2013	3,498 cc (3.498 L; 213.5 cu in) V6 (M276)	306 PS (225 kW; 302 hp) at 6,500, 370 N⋅m (273 lbf⋅ft) at 3,500
S 350 4MATIC	2007–2013	3,498 cc (3.498 L; 213.5 cu in) V6 (M272)	272 PS (200 kW; 268 hp) at 6,000, 350 N⋅m (258 lbf⋅ft) at 2,400–5,000
S 400 HYBRID	2009–2013	3,498 cc (3.498 L; 213.5 cu in) V6 (M272)	279 PS (205 kW; 275 hp) at 6,000, 350 N⋅m (258 lbf⋅ft) at 2,400–5,000
S 400 HYBRID	2009–2013	3-phase AC magneto motor (external rotor)	20 PS (15 kW; 20 hp) at 6,000, 160 N⋅m (118 lbf⋅ft)
S 400 HYBRID	2009–2013	Total	299 PS (220 kW; 295 hp) at, 385 N⋅m (284 lbf⋅ft) at 2,400–5,000
S 450, S 450 4MATIC	2006–2013	4,663 cc (4.663 L; 284.6 cu in) V8 (M273)	340 PS (250 kW; 335 hp) at 6,000, 460 N⋅m (339 lbf⋅ft) at 2,700–5,000
S 500 / S 550	2005–2011	5,461 cc (5.461 L; 333.3 cu in) V8 (M273)	388 PS (285 kW; 383 hp) at 6,000, 530 N⋅m (391 lbf⋅ft) at 2,800–4,800
S 500 BlueEFFICIENCY / S 550 (US)	2011–2013	4,663 cc (4.663 L; 284.6 cu in) V8 BiTurbo (M278)	435 PS (320 kW; 429 hp) at 6,000, 700 N⋅m (516 lbf⋅ft) at 2,800–4,800
S 500 4MATIC / S 550 4MATIC	2006–2011	5,461 cc (5.461 L; 333.3 cu in) V8 (M273)	388 PS (285 kW; 383 hp) at 6,000, 530 N⋅m (391 lbf⋅ft) at 2,800–4,800
S 500 4MATIC / S 550 4MATIC	2011–2013	4,663 cc (4.663 L; 284.6 cu in) V8 BiTurbo (M278)	435 PS (320 kW; 429 hp) at 6,000, 700 N⋅m (516 lbf⋅ft) at 2,800–4,800
S 600, S 600 Guard	2006–2013	5,513 cc (5.513 L; 336.4 cu in) V12 BiTurbo (M275 E 55 AL)	517 PS (380 kW; 510 hp) at 5,000, 830 N⋅m (612 lbf⋅ft) at 1,800–3,500
S 600 Guard Pullman	2008–2013	5,513 cc (5.513 L; 336.4 cu in) V12 BiTurbo (M275 E 55 AL)	517 PS (380 kW; 510 hp) at 5,000, 830 N⋅m (612 lbf⋅ft) at 1,800–3,500
S 63 AMG	2006–2010	6,208 cc (6.208 L; 378.8 cu in) V8 (M156)	525 PS (386 kW; 518 hp) at 6,800, 630 N⋅m (465 lbf⋅ft) at 5,200
S 63 AMG	2010–2013	5,461 cc (5.461 L; 333.3 cu in) V8 BiTurbo (M157)	544 PS (400 kW; 537 hp) at 5,500, 800 N⋅m (590 lbf⋅ft) at 2,000-4,500
S 63 AMG (AMG Performance Package)	2010–2013	5,461 cc (5.461 L; 333.3 cu in) V8 BiTurbo (M157)	571 PS (420 kW; 563 hp) at 5,500, 900 N⋅m (664 lbf⋅ft) at 2,000-4,500
S 65 AMG	2006–2010	5,980 cc (5.98 L; 365 cu in) V12 BiTurbo (M275 E 60 AL)	612 PS (450 kW; 604 hp) at 4,800–5,100, 1,000 N⋅m (738 lbf⋅ft) at 2,000–4,000
S 65 AMG	2010–2013	5,980 cc (5.98 L; 365 cu in) V12 BiTurbo (M275 E 60 AL)	630 PS (460 kW; 620 hp) at 4,800–5,100, 1,000 N⋅m (738 lbf⋅ft) at 2,000–4,000
Diesel engines
S 250 / S 300 CDI	2009–2013	2,143 cc (2.143 L; 130.8 cu in) I4 BiTurbo (OM651)	204 PS (150 kW; 201 hp) at 4,200, 500 N⋅m (369 lbf⋅ft) at 1,600–1,800
S 300 BlueTec HYBRID	2009–2010	2,987 cc (2.987 L; 182.3 cu in) V6 Turbo (OM642) + electric motor	Total 265 PS (195 kW; 261 hp), 560 N⋅m (413 lbf⋅ft)
S 320 CDI, S 320 CDI 4MATIC	2006–2008	2,987 cc (2.987 L; 182.3 cu in) V6 Turbo (OM642)	235 PS (173 kW; 232 hp) at 3,600, 540 N⋅m (398 lbf⋅ft) at 1,600–2,400
S 320 CDI BlueEFFICIENCY	2008–2009	2,987 cc (2.987 L; 182.3 cu in) V6 Turbo (OM642)	235 PS (173 kW; 232 hp) at 3,600, 540 N⋅m (398 lbf⋅ft) at 1,600–2,400
S 350 CDI BlueEFFICIENCY, S 350 CDI 4MATIC	2009–2011	2,987 cc (2.987 L; 182.3 cu in) V6 Turbo (OM642)	235 PS (173 kW; 232 hp) at 3,600, 540 N⋅m (398 lbf⋅ft) at 1,600–2,400
S 350 BlueTEC, S 350 BlueTEC 4 MATIC -with AdBlue	2011–2013	2,987 cc (2.987 L; 182.3 cu in) V6 Turbo (OM642)	258 PS (190 kW; 254 hp) at 3,600, 620 N⋅m (457 lbf⋅ft) at 1,600-2,400
S 350 4MATIC BlueTec (US)	2012–2013	2,987 cc (2.987 L; 182.3 cu in) V6 Turbo (OM642)	240 hp (179 kW; 243 PS) at 3,600, 455 ft⋅lbf (617 N⋅m) at 1,600–2,400
S 420 CDI	2006–2009	3,996 cc (3.996 L; 243.9 cu in) V8 BiTurbo (OM629)	320 PS (235 kW; 316 hp) at 3,600, 730 N⋅m (538 lbf⋅ft) at 2,200
S 450 CDI	2009–2011	3,996 cc (3.996 L; 243.9 cu in) V8 BiTurbo (OM629)	320 PS (235 kW; 316 hp) at 3,600, 730 N⋅m (538 lbf⋅ft) at 2,200

S 280 is only sold in the United Kingdom, Ireland and Asia (badged as S 300).

S 350 CDI 4MATIC is badged as S 350 CDI 4MATIC BlueEFFICIENCY in Germany.

S 500 is badged as S 550 in Canada, US and Japan market.

=== Transmissions ===
All models with the exception of the S600 and S65 AMG are equipped with the 7G-TRONIC transmission. S350, S350 4MATIC, S400 Hybrid, S450, S450 4MATIC, S500 include 7G-TRONIC Sport transmission. Models with 7G-TRONIC transmission include DIRECT SELECT, which allows 7G-TRONIC to be electronically controlled by touching the lever on the right-hand side of the steering column.

The S600 retains the 5G-TRONIC automatic transmission. S65 AMG included five-speed automatic SPEEDSHIFT transmission with DIRECT SELECT.

Beginning in 2009, S63 AMG includes AMG SPEEDSHIFT 7G-TRONIC transmission, S65 AMG includes AMG SPEEDSHIFT 5-speed automatic transmission.

=== Handling ===
All models except S 63 AMG, S 600 L, S 65 L AMG use AIRMATIC suspension, with optional Active Body Control except for 4MATIC models. S 63 AMG, S 600 L, S 65 L AMG include Active Body Control as standard.

4MATIC models were unveiled in the 2006 Paris Motor Show. Initial products include S 450 4MATIC and S 500 4MATIC, followed by S 320 CDI 4MATIC in 2006–12, then S 350 4MATIC in mid 2007. All 4MATIC models were made in short and long wheelbases. S 320 CDI 4MATIC was replaced by S 350 CDI 4MATIC.

== Sales ==
On 11 May 2009, Mercedes-Benz announced the sale of 270,000 units since the original W221 launch.

== Production ==
S 600 Guard and S 600 Guard Pullman were built in Sindelfingen plant with a separate production line.

== Marketing ==
As part of the W221 launch campaign, Mercedes-Benz Accessories GmbH introduced a series of 17 products under S-Class Collection, beginning in 2005–09. Products include a wrist watch designed with Sindelfingen-based Design Centre, piqué polo shirt, cufflinks, pen, umbrella, key fob, mouse pads, pen cases, cigar set, note pad, wallet, and 1/43 S-Class scale model car. Mercedes-Benz Accessories GmbH also introduced a series of 1,200 units of S-Class vehicle freight train.

== Awards ==
In the 2007 J.D. Power Initial Quality Study, the W221 tied for first ranking in its category (with the Audi A8) for having the fewest quality problems in the industry after 90 days of ownership. The W221 was given the Bild am Sonntag 2006 Golden Steering Wheel Award in the Luxury category, Drive Car of the Year Awards Best Luxury Car over A$60,000, and top luxury auto in the Topauto 2006 awards. Safety awards include Popular Mechanics' 2007 Automotive Excellence Award for Safety, 2007's What Car? Safety Award, and 2006 British Insurance Car Security Award. Design awards include Wheels Magazine's 2006 Automotive Design Award, Automotive Circle International (ACI) "EuroCarBody Award 2005", Topauto 2006 award winner in the Innovation category for the Distronic Plus adaptive cruise control, and 2006 Automotive Interior of the Year Awards for Best Seat.
