= Volkswagen Futura =

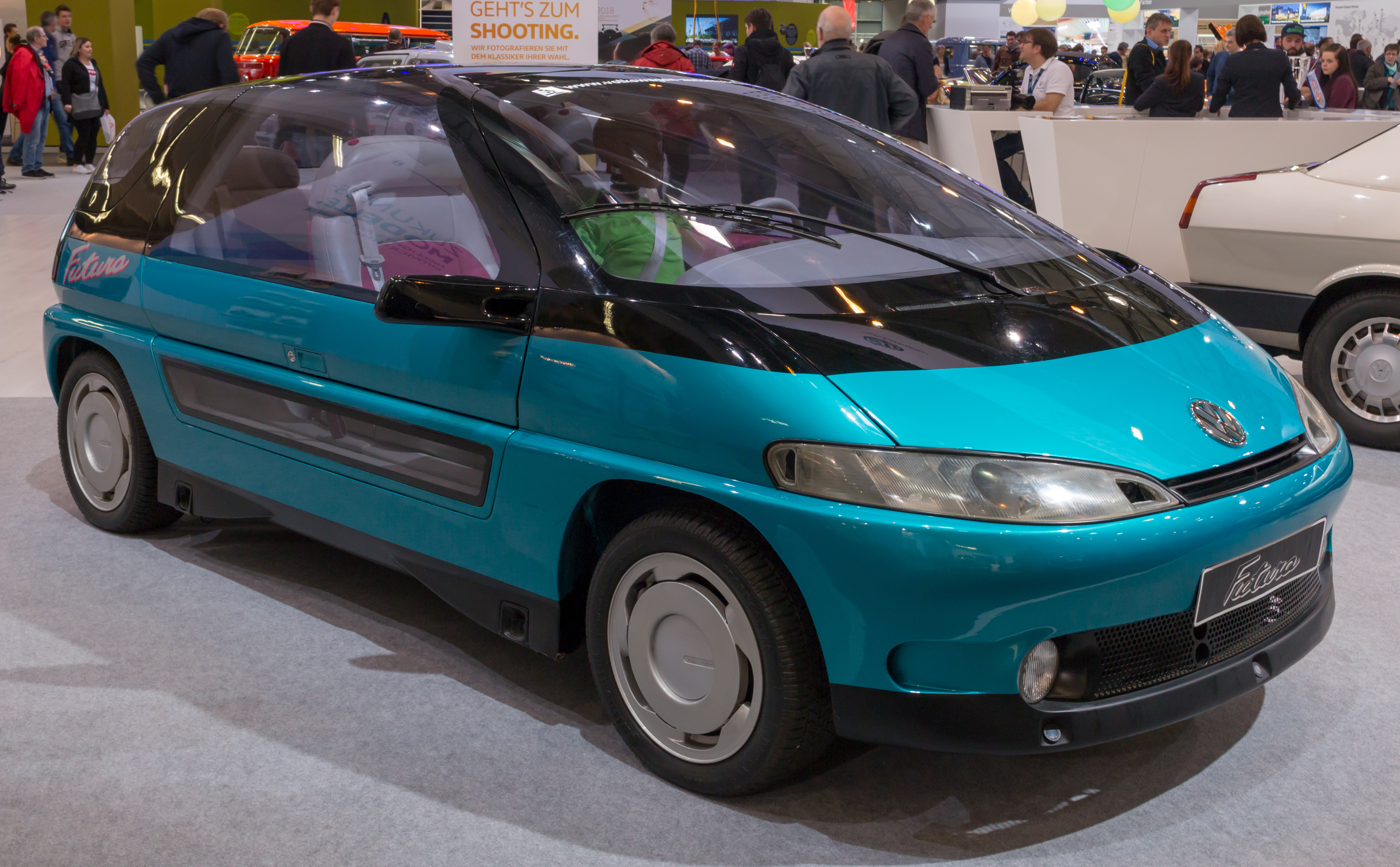
- Volkswagen Futura at Techno Classica 2018

Overview
- Manufacturer: Volkswagen
- Model years: 1989
- Designer: Integrated Research Volkswagen

Body and chassis
- Class: Concept car
- Body style: 2-door minivan
- Doors: Gull-wing doors

Powertrain
- Engine: 1.7 L (1,715 cc) supercharged I4
- Transmission: Automatic transmission

Dimensions
- Length: 3,780 mm (149 in.)

The Volkswagen Futura is a concept vehicle developed by the German car manufacturer Volkswagen.

== History ==
The Futura was presented in 1989 at the Frankfurt Motor Show.

== Design and features ==
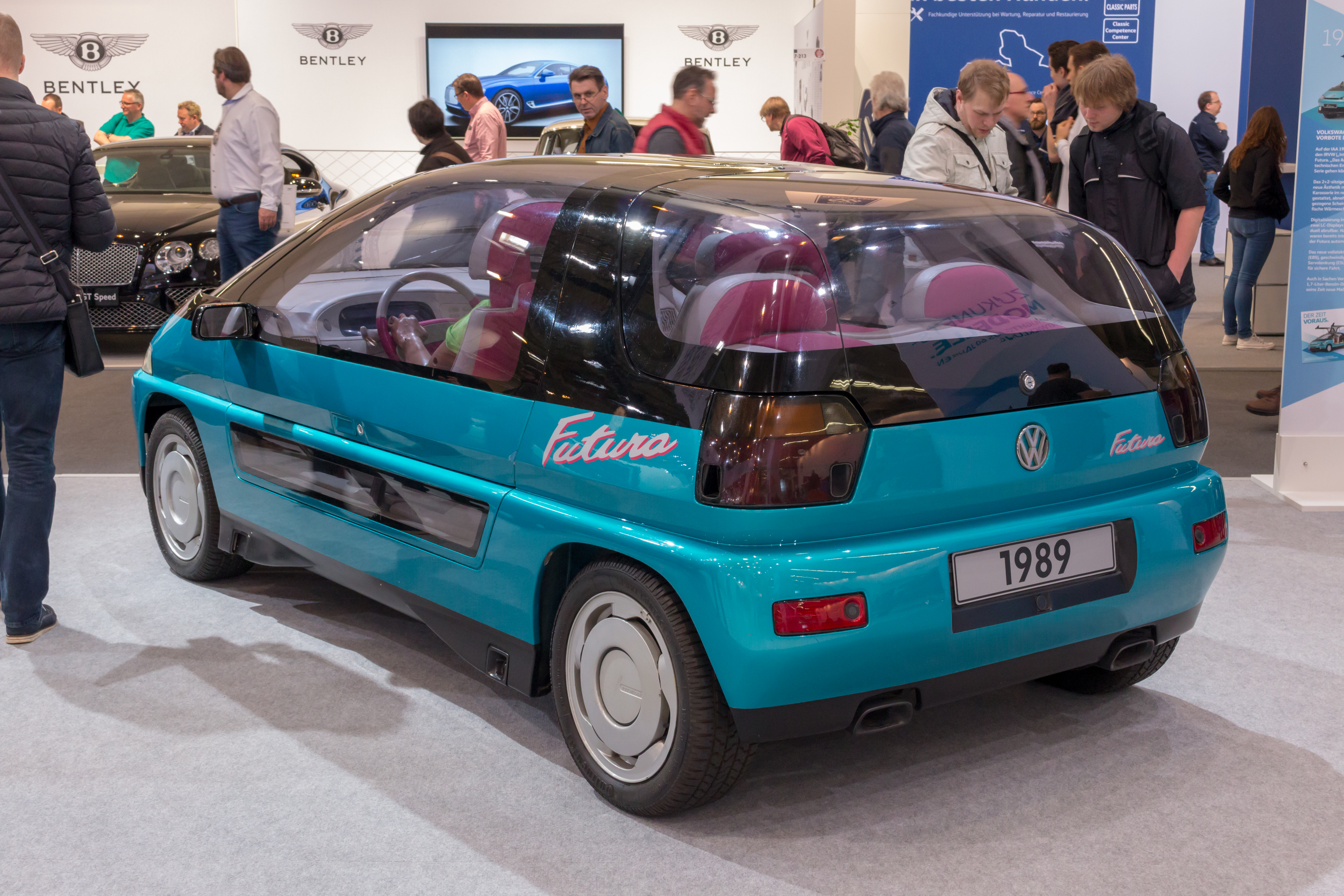
Rear 3/4 view

The Futura was intended to be an experimental, innovative vehicle, and Volkswagen imagined it as an idea of where the automobile could be 10 to 15 years in the future. As a result, the Futura incorporated a number of advanced features, including an electric parking brake, four-wheel steering, and the implementation of a fully automatic anti-lock system. It also made use of an on-board computer, and could, according to Volkswagen, position itself in parking spaces without any form of driver input (automatic parking).

The engine was designed to be as economical as possible, capable of an estimated 39.2 miles per US gallon (6.00 L/100 km; 47.1 mpg_{‑imp}). It achieved this through a 1,715 cc straight-four engine, which was, similarly to other Volkswagen models of the era (such as the Polo and Golf) equipped with a G-Lader supercharger, improving fuel efficiency by a large margin. It made 82 PS (81 hp; 102 kW) and 155 newton-metres (114 lbf⋅ft) of torque. The Futura also had no radiator, instead cooling the engine through the use of a newly engineered evaporative cooling system developed for the Futura.

Exterior-wise, the car resembled a shortened MPV from many angles, although much unlike a traditional minivan, it had 2 seats and gull-wing doors, which were a rather uncommon characteristic across vehicles of all classes during that period.
