= Automotive night vision =

Vehicle safety system

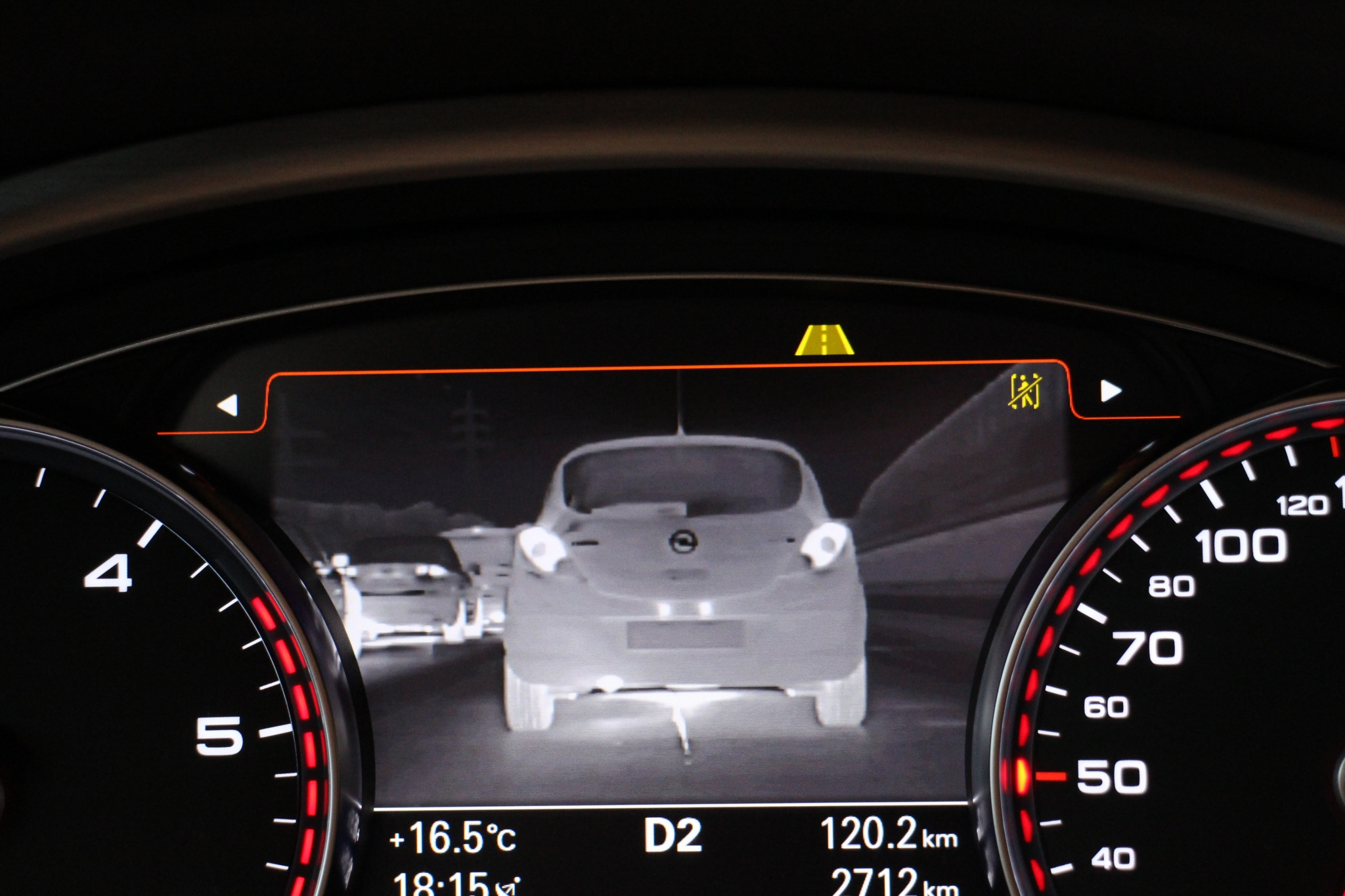
Audi A8 Night Vision Assistant

An automotive night vision system uses a thermographic camera to increase a driver's perception and seeing distance in darkness or poor weather beyond the reach of the vehicle's headlights. Automotive night vision systems generally rely on infrared sensors, which detect energy on the infrared spectrum. This allows the vehicle to perceive heat signatures from pedestrians and animals in dark conditions. Such systems are offered as optional equipment on certain premium vehicles. Incorporating night vision technology adds to the growing complexity of modern vehicles. These systems require Electronic Control Units (ECUs) to process the raw data, which then must be integrated into the vehicle's existing data networks to function reliably with the engine and powertrain. The technology was first introduced in the year 2000 on the Cadillac Deville. This technology is based on the night vision devices (NVD), which generally denotes any electronically enhanced optical devices operate in three modes: image enhancement, thermal imaging, and active illumination. The automotive night vision system is a combination of NVDs such as infrared cameras, GPS, Lidar, and Radar, among others to sense and detect objects. Recent advancements have expanded automotive thermal imaging beyond driver displays, and are now being included in the sensor suites of autonomous vehicles and Advanced Driver Assistance Systems (ADAS).

== Display type ==
- Instrument cluster using a high resolution liquid-crystal display (LCD), newest type
- navigation system or information screen, least expensive and with display's location further away from driver's field of vision (used exclusively by BMW, and the W212 E-class)
- windshield via head-up display, earliest type, dimmer knob can reduce brightness, display nearest to driver's line of sight

There are two types of systems, either passive or active systems, both have advantages and disadvantages when compared to the other. The passive system pertains to the technologies that detect thermal radiation emitted by humans, animals, and other objects in the road while the active systems illuminate objects as a significant distance ahead using infrared light sources.

== Active systems ==
Active systems use an infrared light source built into the car to illuminate the road ahead with light that is invisible to humans. There are two kinds of active systems: gated and non-gated. The gated system uses a pulsed light source and a synchronized camera that enable long ranges (250m) and high performance in rain and snow.

Near Infrared wavelength is 0.75–1.4 µm is smaller and can pass between the typical fog particles. Fog particles sizes are typically 10 to 15 microns and ranges is sizes from 1 to 100 microns. Far infrared has a wavelength of 15 micrometers (µm) to 1 mm. During night-time operations, police officers with range gated near infrared cameras can read license plates at a distance of up to 1.2 km. Near Infrared (NIR) cameras are available to see 50 km through fog, haze, smoke, rain.

- Pros: higher resolution image, superior picture of inanimate objects, works better in warmer conditions, smaller sensor can be mounted to rearview mirror.
- Cons: does not work as well in fog or rain, lower contrast for animals, shorter range of 150–200 meters or 500–650 feet

=== Mercedes-Benz ===
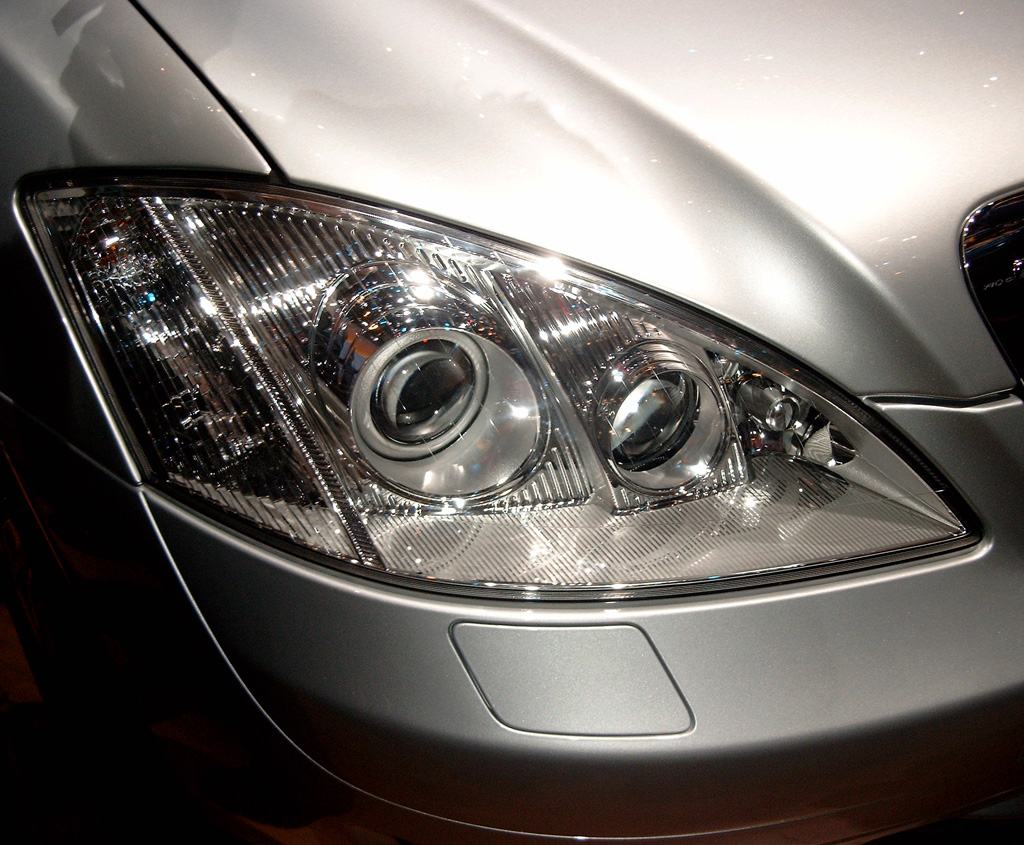
Night View Assist infrared projector visible next to the main headlight on a Mercedes-Benz S-Class (W221)

Night View Assist prototype was shown in 2003 on the Mercedes-Benz F500 concept.

Series production Night View Assist system introduced in 2005 on the redesigned Mercedes-Benz S-Class (W221). It was the first system to use the instrument cluster's LCD as a display.

2009: Night View Assist Plus added a pedestrian detection function calling the revised system on the redesigned Mercedes-Benz E-Class (W212) and refreshed S-class, however, the E-class uses the navigation screen's display.

2011: Night View Assist Plus with Spotlight Function premiere: the Mercedes-Benz CL-Class (C216) became the first series production car with night vision-guided pedestrian spotlighting (HID version) can flash at any pedestrians it detects in order to warn both the driver and the pedestrians. The flashing light is directed in such a way that vehicles in front and oncoming traffic are not dazzled.

2013: Night View Assist Plus with animal detection on the W222 S-Class.

=== Toyota ===
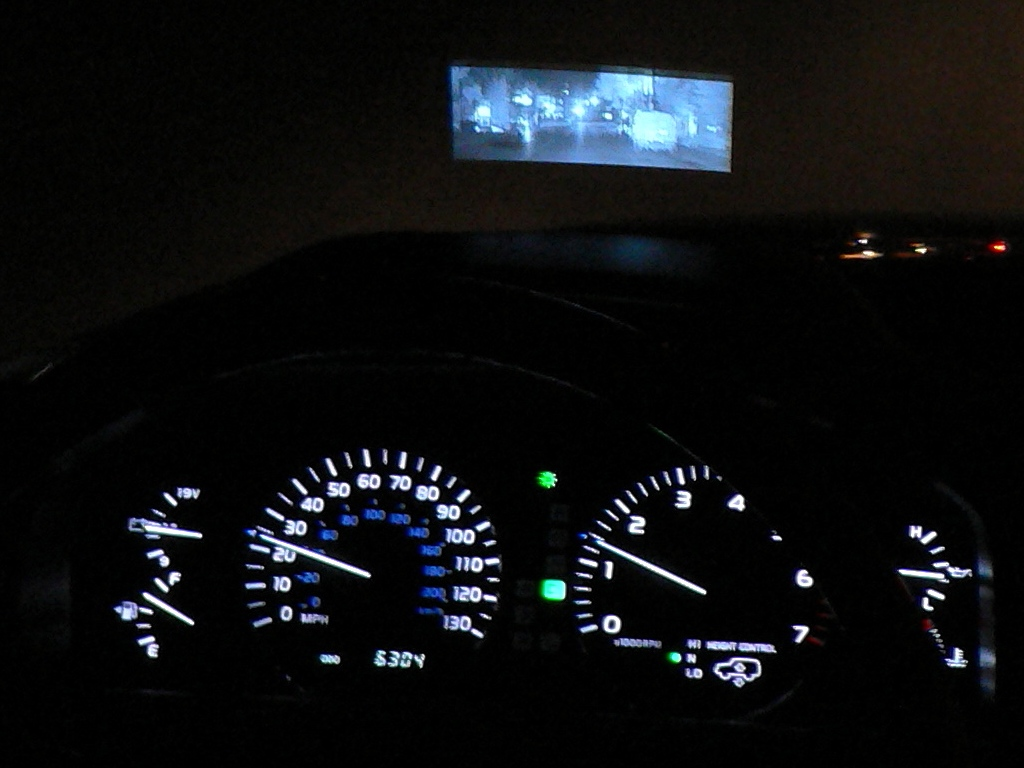
Night View system on the 2003 Lexus LX 470

In 2002 Toyota Night View was the first worldwide series production active automotive night vision system, introduced optionally on the Toyota Landcruiser Cygnus or Lexus LX470. This system first uses the near infrared light projectors placed next to the fog lights emitting near infrared light aimed like the car's high beam headlights. Then, a CCD camera behind the rear view mirror captures that reflected infrared light, and then this signal is processed by the computer which produces a monochromatic image which is projected right above the gauge cluster onto the windshield.

In February 2008 the Toyota Crown Hybrid added a feature which highlights pedestrians and presents them in a box on an LCD in front of the driver. This was the first pedestrian detection feature for an active system.

In 2009, Lexus introduced Night View on the LS, but only in Japan.

In 2012 Lexus introduced Night View worldwide, on LS and GS. The Night View system combines a windshield mounted near infra-red camera and near infra-red projectors within the headlamps with a Night View ECU to display an image of the road ahead on center console display screen. Moving the image from the driver’s instrument display to the center console offers drivers a larger display and an easier viewing angle. With the camera constantly in operation and the near infra-red projectors activating at speeds over 10 MPH to enhance system efficiency, night view will display an area up to 65 feet in front of the vehicle. This system was discontinued for 2014 in the US.

== Passive systems ==
Passive infrared systems do not use an infrared light source, instead they capture thermal radiation already emitted by the objects, using a thermographic camera.

- Pros: greater range of about 300 meters or 1,000 feet, higher contrast for living objects
- Cons: grainy, lower resolution image, works poorly in warmer weather conditions, larger sensor

=== Audi ===
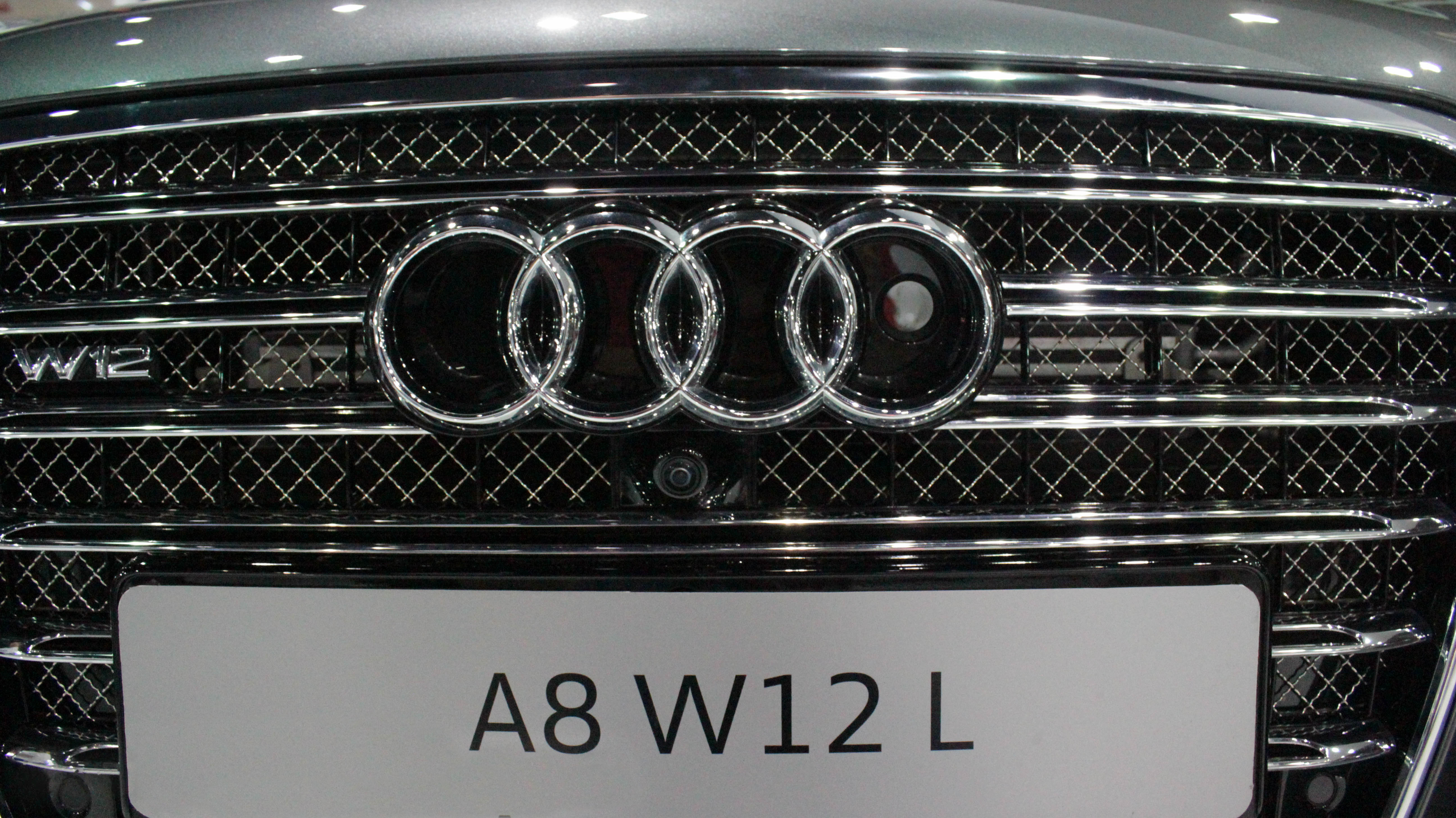
Night Vision Assistant infrared camera visible on Audi A8 grill, right circle

Night Vision Assistant was introduced in 2010 on the Audi A8. It uses a thermal imaging camera behind the four rings at the front of the car which can "see" 300 meters (984 ft) ahead. The display in the instrument cluster highlights humans with yellow markings. More importantly, the computer can determine if the person on the road moves in a way that could lead to a collision with the car. In that case the pedestrian is being marked in red color and the driver of the car receives an audible warning.

2013 update added animal detection. and Pedestrian Marker Lights: As soon as a pedestrian is detected by the Night Vision Assistant in a critical range in front of the vehicle, individual Matrix LEDs flash briefly 3 times in succession to alert that person, who is then clearly visible to the driver.

=== BMW ===
BMW Night Vision introduced in 2005 on the BMW 7 Series (E65). This system processes far infrared radiation, which minimizes non-essential information placing a greater emphasis on pedestrians and animals, allows for a range of 300 meters or nearly 1,000 feet, and avoids "dazzle" from headlights, road lights and similar intense light sources.

2008 update added pedestrian detection system on the redesigned BMW 7 Series (F01), which flashes a caution symbol on the navigation/information screen and automotive head-up display when it detects pedestrians. This updated system automatically scans up to 100 yards ahead of the vehicle when it reaches 25 mph, and applies a yellow tint to the pedestrians on the head-up display.

2013 update added Dynamic Light Spot.

2013 update added animal detection. The system provides a real-time video image that also depicts on the Control Display persons, animals and other objects emitting heat when they are outside of the light beam and warns in the event of an impending collision. The Dynamic Light Spot is produced by a special headlight that directs the light beam onto the recognised persons or animals respectively, thus drawing the driver’s attention to possible hazards in good time. As soon as the remote infrared detects pedestrians or larger animals on course for collision in the dark, the system directs two separately controlled Dynamic Light Spots at them without creating an unpleasant glare. In the event of an acute risk, an acoustic warning signal is also sounded and the brakes are set to maximum standby. For the model year 2014, the BMW 5 Series will also have these new features.

=== Cadillac ===
First worldwide series production automotive night vision on 2000 Cadillac Deville: Night Vision, however it was discontinued in 2004. This system was developed with Raytheon and worked by using a passive infrared sensor camera mounted behind the vehicle's grille. Infrared radiation is picked up by the sensor, processed by computer and then displayed on the windshield using a head-up display. Information is displayed as a black-and-white image with warmer objects in white, while cooler objects appear black. Because this system outputs a standard NTSC composite video signal and the used parts are somewhat easy and inexpensive to find, it has become a popular choice for fitting thermal night vision to other vehicles. After a long hiatus, the 2016 flagship Cadillac CT6 was equipped with an improved version of the Enhanced Night Vision, in which the images are displayed and embedded in the instrument panel instead of being displayed as a reflection on the windshield.

=== Honda ===
In 2004, Honda introduced first worldwide system with pedestrian detection on redesigned Honda Legend: Intelligent Night Vision. It detected far infrared radiation. The pedestrian detection feature alerted the driver with an audio warning and visually enclosed the pedestrian in a box on the display which was presented via head-up display. The night vision system uses a separate heads up type display projected on the center bottom of the windshield. The infrared cameras do not require a light source, and the software is able to detect human like figures, surround the image with a red box and give audible caution tones.

=== DS Automobiles ===
DS Night Vision offers road visibility by night. An infrared camera in the front grill identifies objects, pedestrians and animals on the road at a distance of up to 100m. A digital instrument cluster shows the driver the area around the car in infrared, with a yellow line around any sources of potential danger. For critical danger, the line becomes red, allowing the driver to react to the situation. The DS 7 Crossback is the first DS vehicle to include Night Vision.

=== Peugeot ===
On the Peugeot 508, an optional night vision system helps to see pedestrians and animals during the night and alert the driver.

== Automobiles ==
=== Active ===
- 2002-2007 Lexus LX 470 (windshield)
- 2009 Lexus LS (instrument cluster)^{1}
- 2012 Lexus LS (navigation screen)^{1}
- 2012 Lexus GS (navigation screen)^{1}
- 2006 Mercedes-Benz CL-Class (C216) (instrument cluster)^{1}
- 2014 Mercedes-Benz S-Class (C217) (instrument cluster)^{1}
- 2009 Mercedes-Benz E-Class (W212) (navigation screen)^{1}
- 2010 Mercedes-Benz CLS-Class (W218) (navigation screen)^{1}
- 2006 Mercedes-Benz S-Class (W221) (instrument cluster)
- 2013 Mercedes-Benz S-Class (W222) (instrument cluster)^{1}
- 2012 Mercedes-Benz M-Class#Third generation (W166: 2011–present)^{1}
- 2012 Mercedes-Benz GL-Class (X166)^{1}
- 2012 Mercedes-Benz R231 SL-Class^{1}
- 2008 Toyota Crown Hybrid (instrument cluster)^{1}
- 2002 Toyota Landcruiser Cignus (windshield)

=== Passive ===
- 2014 Audi A8 (instrument cluster)^{1}
- 2011 Audi A6 C7 (instrument cluster)^{1}
- 2010-2018 Audi A8 D4
- 2010-2017Audi A7 (instrument cluster)^{1}
- 2018-2020Audi A7 (instrument cluster)^{1}
- 2016 Audi Q7 (instrument cluster)^{1}
- 2005 BMW 5 Series (navigation screen)
- 2008 BMW 5 Series (navigation screen)^{1}
- 2005 BMW 7 Series (navigation screen)
- 2008 BMW 7 Series (navigation screen)^{1}
- 2011 BMW 6 Series (navigation screen)^{1}
- 2013 BMW X5 (F15)(navigation screen)^{1}
- 2014 BMW X6 (F16)(navigation screen)^{1}
- 2009 BMW 5 Series Gran Turismo(navigation screen)^{1}
- 2000-2004 Cadillac Deville (windshield)
- 2016-2020 Cadillac CT6 (instrument cluster)^{1}
- 2004 Honda Legend (windshield)^{1}
- 2017 DS 7 Crossback (instrument cluster)^{1}
- 2018 Peugeot 508 (instrument cluster)^{1}
- 2020 Peugeot 3008 & Peugeot 5008 (instrument cluster)^{1}

^{1} includes pedestrian and animal detection

== See also ==
- Adaptive headlamp
- Automatic highbeam headlamp
- CCD camera
- Far infrared
- Infrared radiation
- Intelligent car
- Near-infrared spectroscopy
- Active infrared night vision
- Pedestrian
- Pedestrian detection
- Thermographic camera
