= Mercedes-Benz CL-Class (C216) =

German luxury coupé (2006–2014)

Mercedes-Benz CL (C216)
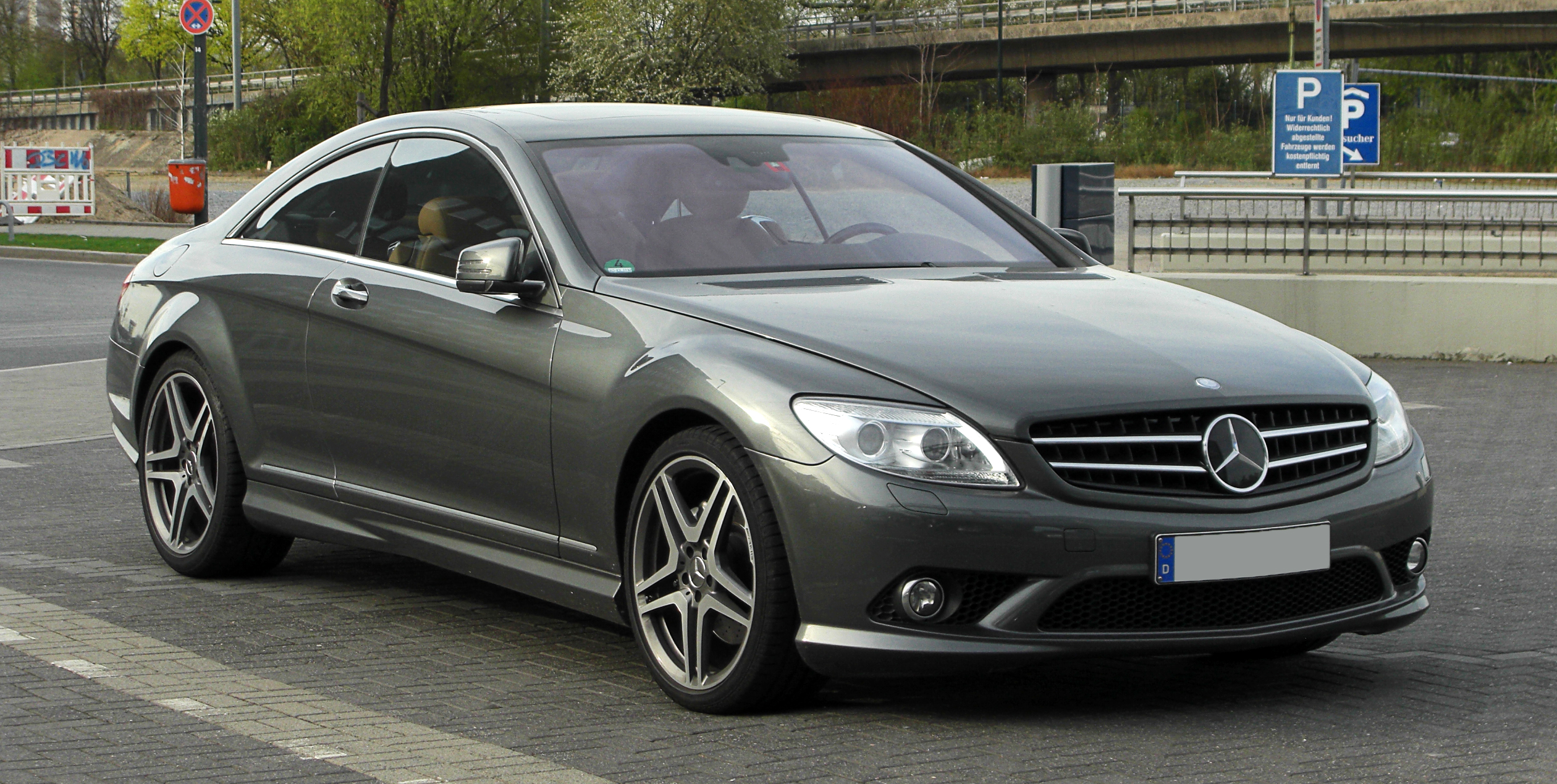

Overview
- Manufacturer: DaimlerChrysler (2006–2007); Daimler AG (2007–2014)
- Production: May 2006–2014
- Model years: 2006–2014 (Australia, Asia, Africa & Europe); 2007–2014 (Americas)
- Assembly: Germany: Sindelfingen
- Designer: Gorden Wagener and Peter Pfeiffer

Body and chassis
- Class: Grand tourer (S)
- Body style: 2-door coupé
- Layout: FR/F4 (4matic)
- Related: Mercedes-Benz S-Class (W221)

Powertrain
- Engine: Petrol: 4.7 L M278 twin-turbo V8; 5.5 L M273 V8; 5.5 L M157 twin-turbo V8; 6.2 L M156 V8; 5.5 L M275 twin-turbo V12; 6.0 L M275 twin-turbo V12
- Transmission: 5-speed 5G-Tronic automatic 7-speed 7G-Tronic automatic

Dimensions
- Wheelbase: 2,955 mm (116.3 in)
- Length: 5,065 mm (199.4 in); AMG: 5,085 mm (200.2 in)
- Width: 1,872 mm (73.7 in)
- Height: 1,417 mm (55.8 in)

Chronology
- Predecessor: Mercedes-Benz C215
- Successor: Mercedes-Benz C217

The Mercedes-Benz C216 is the last generation for the grand tourer with name Mercedes-Benz CL-Class, produced from 2006 to 2014. It replaced the C215 platform, and was replaced in 2014 by the C217 S-Class Coupé.

== Initial release (2006–2010) ==
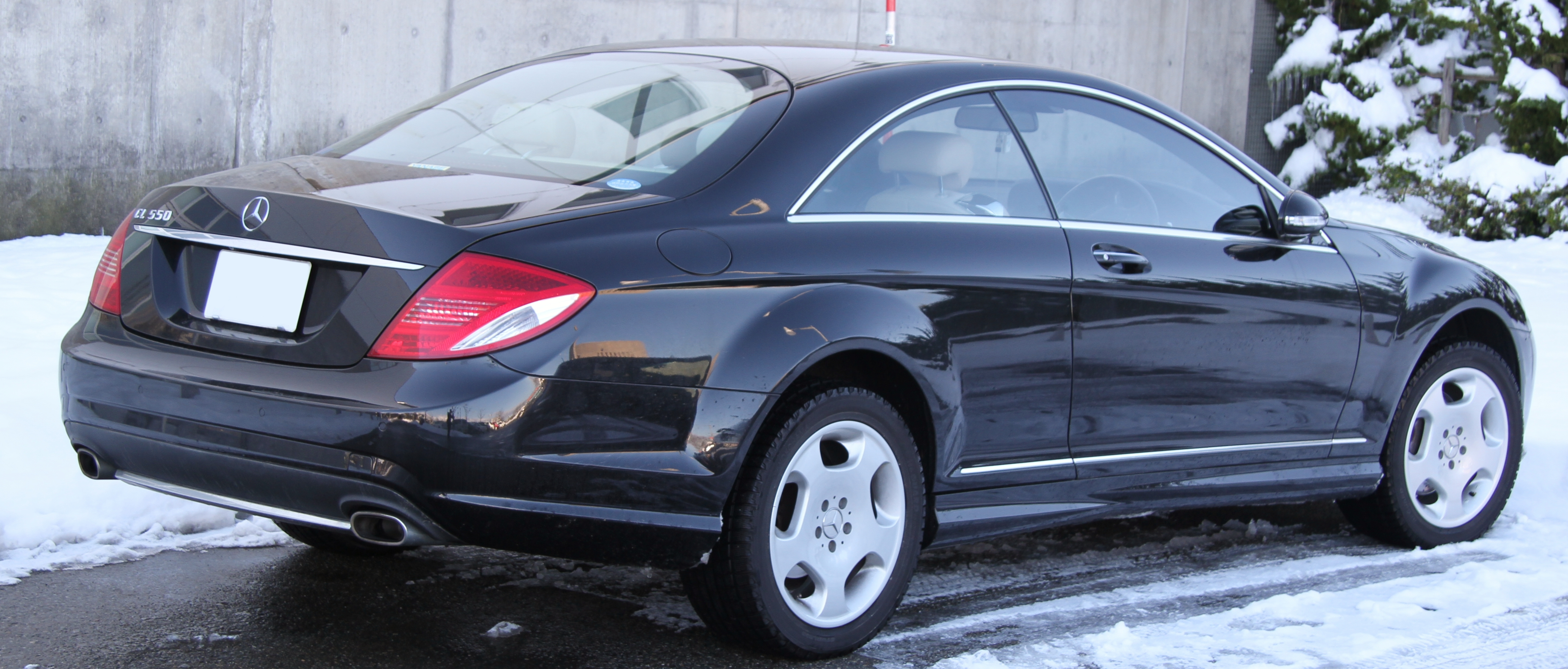
Mercedes-Benz CL 550 (pre-facelift)

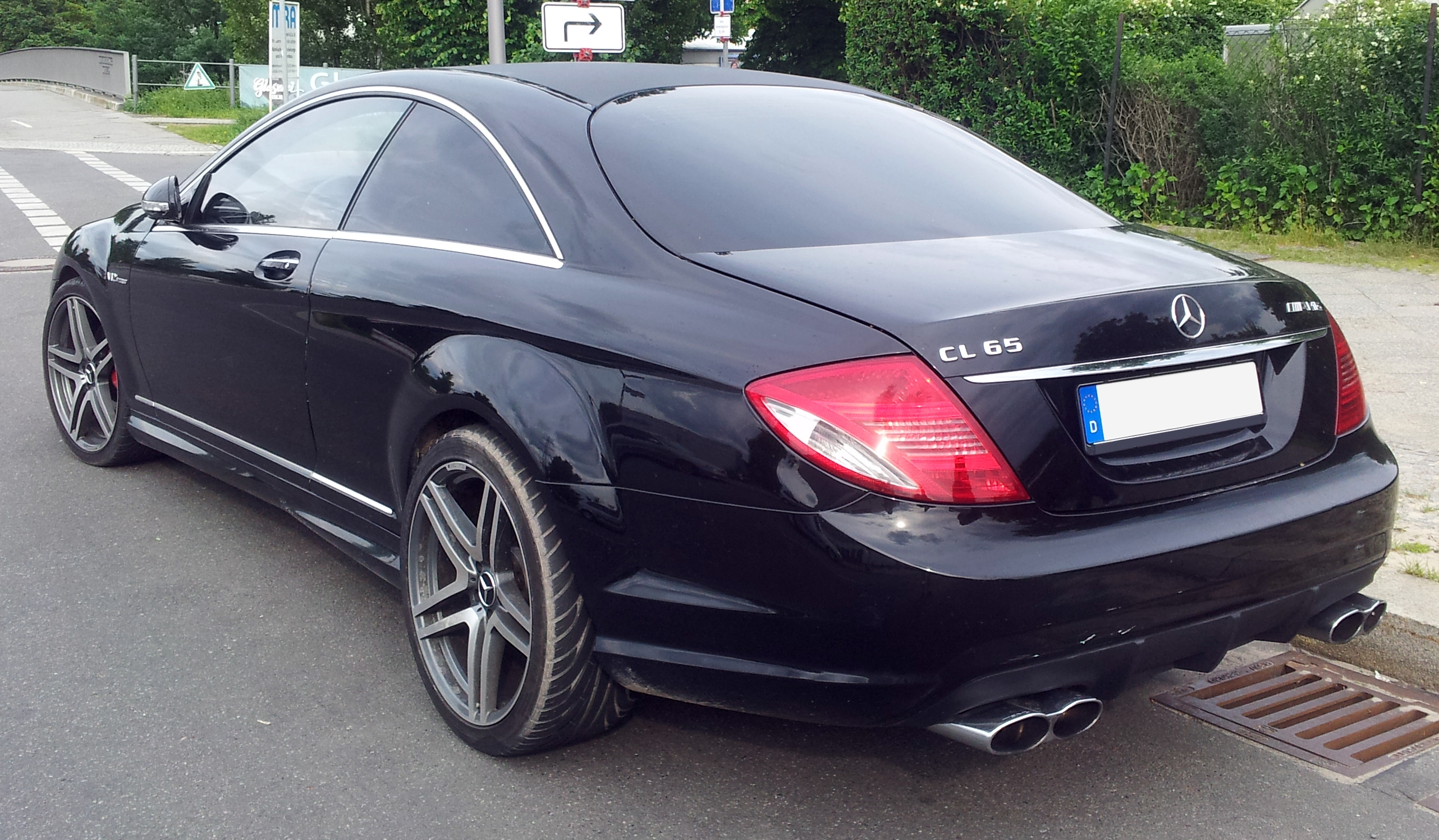
Mercedes-Benz CL 65 AMG (pre-facelift)

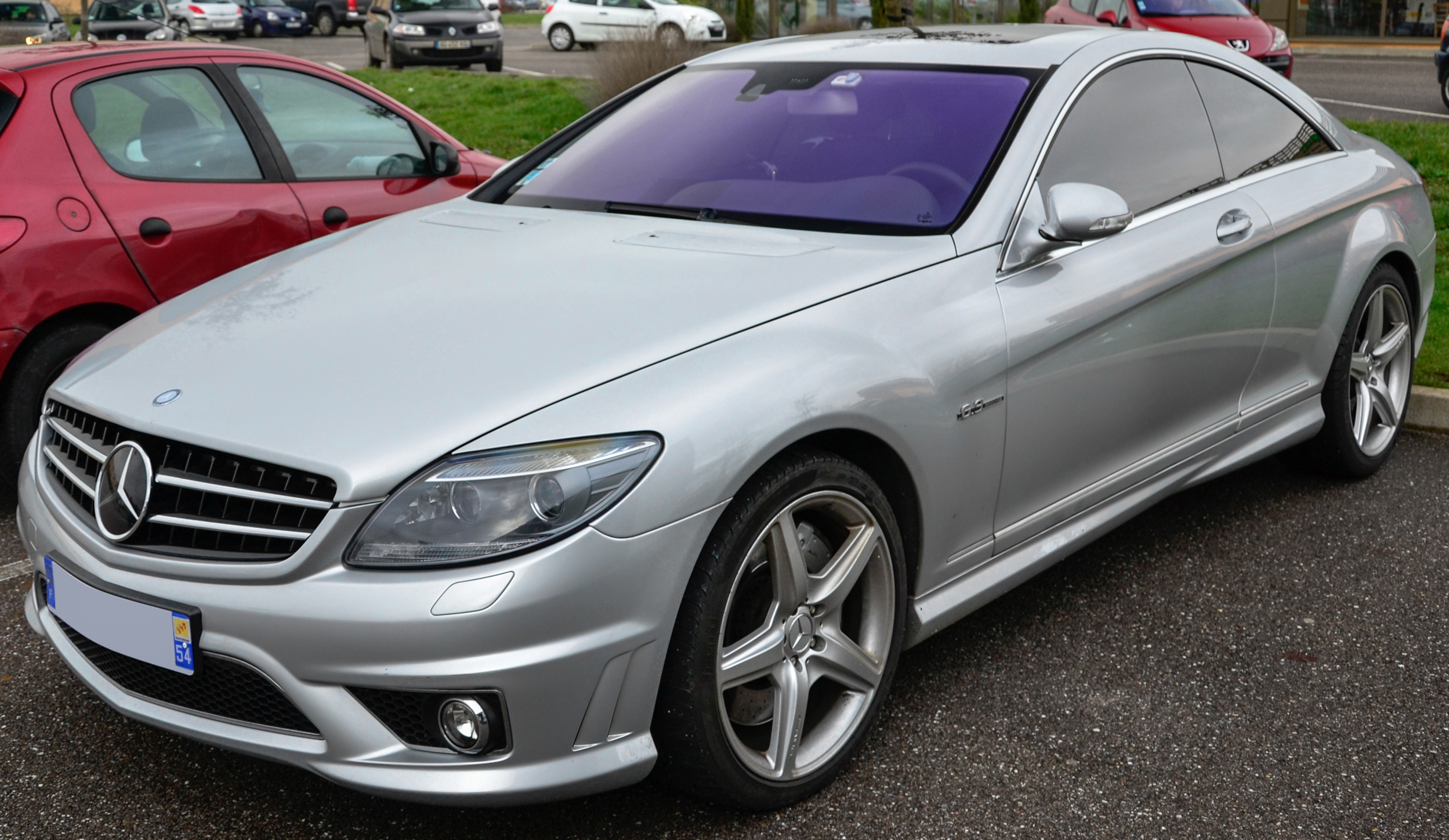
Mercedes-Benz CL 63 AMG (pre-facelift)

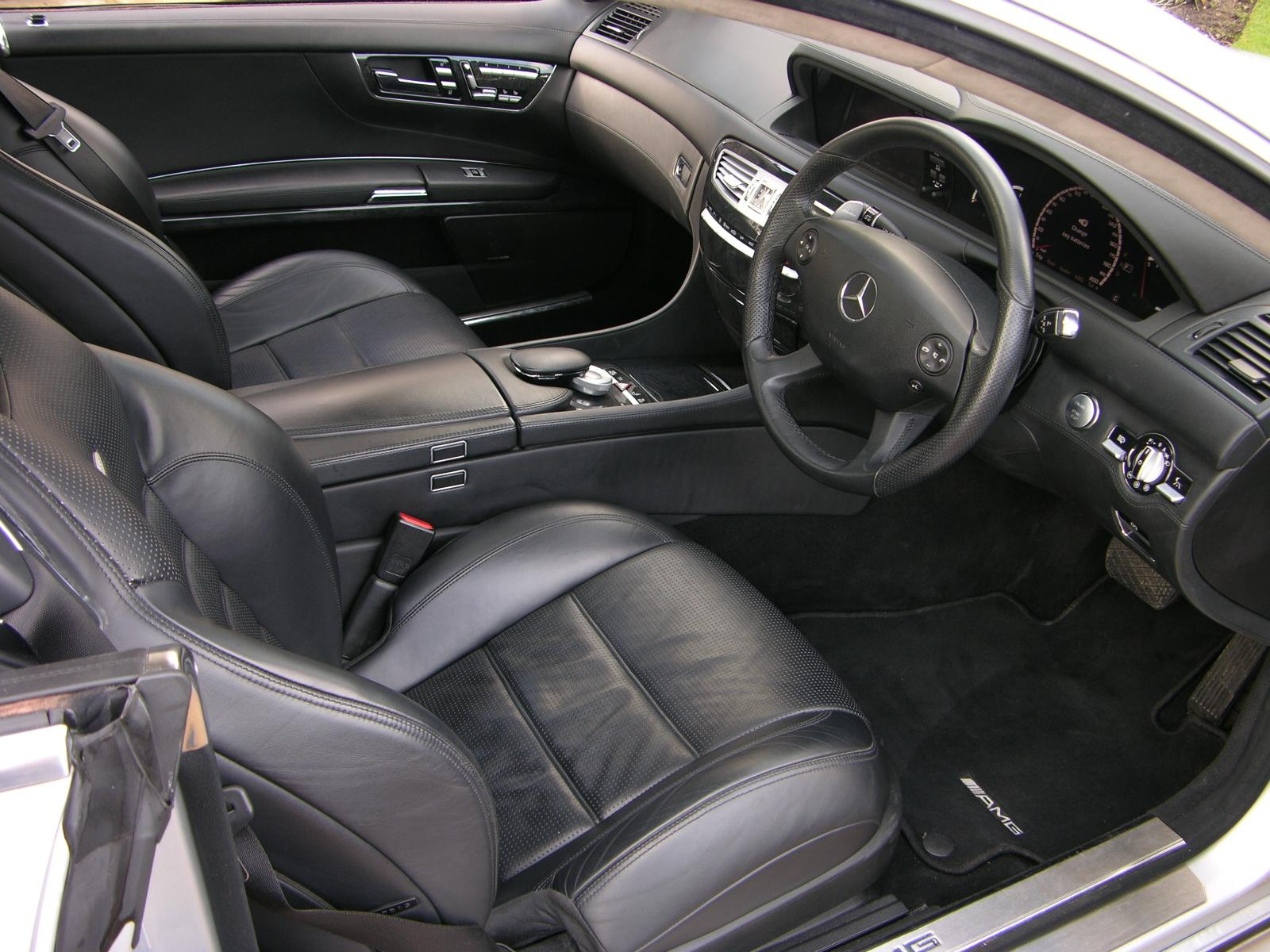
Mercedes-Benz CL 63 AMG interior

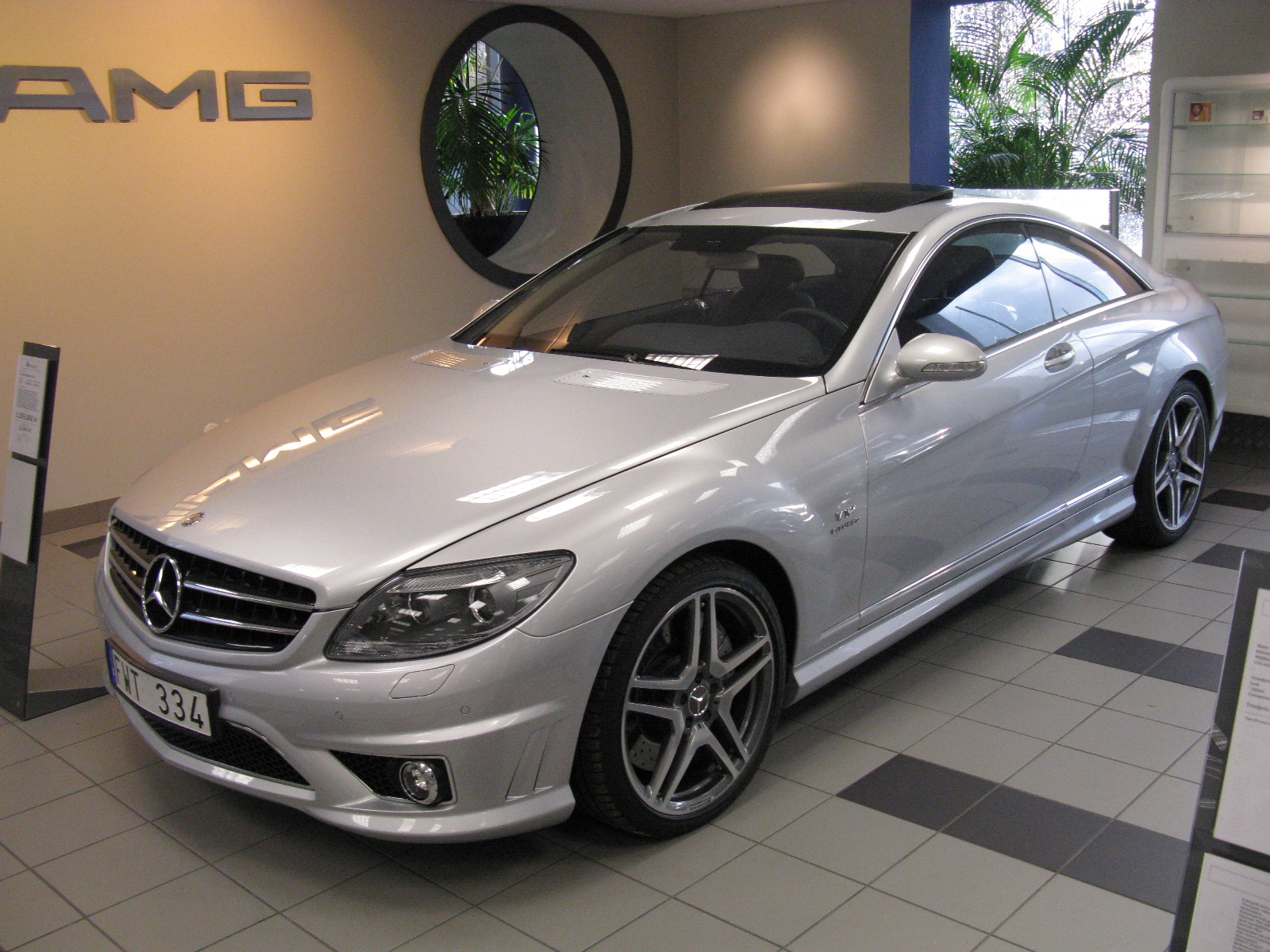
Mercedes-Benz CL 65 AMG (pre facelift)

The C216 body was designed by Gorden Wagener and Peter Pfeiffer.

The chassis is based on the W221 S-Class. The two-door coupé is heavier than the equivalent S saloon, weighing 2,045 kg (4,508 lb), and rides on a full-size 116.3-inch wheelbase (albeit 8.2 inches less than the long wheelbase S-Class, which is the only S-Class sold in the U.S.). Despite its large size, rear seat legroom is limited in keeping in the tradition of 2+2 luxury coupés, though CL has more rear passenger space than its rivals. The CL's boot is as large as that of the Audi A8 flagship saloon. Like previous CL models, the C216 features a pillarless design with no B-pillar between the front and rear side windows.

The vehicle was unveiled at the 2006 Paris Motor Show, followed by the 28th Bangkok International Motor Show (in right-hand drive configuration).

The vehicle went on sale in Early-July 2006 in Europe (UK arrival spring 2007). Early models included the CL 500 with the 7G-TRONIC transmission, and CL 600 with five-speed automatic transmission.

=== CL 65 AMG (2008–2010) ===
The CL 65 AMG is a version of the CL 600 with power increased to 612 PS (450 kW; 604 hp) at 4,800-5,100 rpm and 1,000 N⋅m (738 lbf⋅ft) at 2,000-4,000 rpm. It also features vented and cross-drilled brake discs (15.4 inches front and 14.8 inches rear), frame-type sliding rear brake calipers, 255/35 ZR 20 front and 275/35 ZR 20 rear tires, forged 20-inch AMG twin-spoke wheels (8.5 inches front and 9.5 in the rear), special AMG spring struts with firmer damping, reworked ESP stability control and ASR traction control.

The 2008 model year Mercedes-Benz CL 65 AMG was unveiled at the 2007 New York International Auto Show.

=== CL 65 AMG, "40th Anniversary" limited-edition (2006) ===
The "40th Anniversary" edition CL 65 AMG is a limited (40 units) version of the CL 65 AMG commemorating the 40th anniversary of AMG, designed by the specialists of the AMG Performance Studio. It includes exclusive AMG Alubeam (Liquid Metal) body paint (from Vision GST and SL 400 CDI), AMG two-bar front grille, large under-bumper air intakes, air outlets on the front fenders and round fog lights, rear apron with a black air diffuser insert and twin V12-design tailpipes, two-tone EXCLUSIVE PASSION Nappa leather seats with new AMG V12 diamond pattern stitching, embossed V12 logos in the front head restraints, color-coordinated Alcantara roof lining, nappa leather upholstery on the airbag unit of the AMG ergonomic sports steering wheel, carbon fiber interior trim, "40th Anniversary" lettering on the center console and a "One Out of 40" badge on the handrest of the COMAND controller.

=== CL 500 "Trademark Centenary" (2009) ===
The CL 500 "Trademark Centenary" is a limited-edition version of the 2009 model year CL 500 and CL 500 4Matic commemorating the 100th birthday of the Mercedes three-pointed star and the Benz emblem, when on 24 June 1909 Daimler-Motoren-Gesellschaft officially registered the design of the Mercedes star, and on 6 August Benz & Cie. registered the letters "Benz", enclosed by a laurel wreath, as a trademark with the Imperial Patent Office. Changes include historic trademarks dating from 1909 in gilded plate brass, which are inset into the centre console; designo metallic graphite body colour, AMG Sports package, exclusive high-sheen 20-inch 5 twin-spoke AMG light-alloy wheels in titanium grey, 255/35 R 20 front and 275/35 R 20 rear tyres, partly hand-stitched designo aniline leather with contrasting seams in a light sand colour, wood/leather steering wheel, interior trim in shining black piano lacquer, anthracite Alcantara roof lining and black floor mats with AMG lettering and sand-coloured edging.

The vehicle went on sale on 26 June 2009.

=== CL 550 "100 Years of Mercedes-Benz Edition" (2009) ===
The CL 550 "100 Years of Mercedes-Benz Edition" is a limited-edition version of the 2010 model year CL 550 and CL 550 4Matic built to commemorate the 100th birthday of the Mercedes three-pointed star and the Benz emblem. It has most of the same features as the CL 500 "Trademark Centenary", including the emblems featuring the original Daimler and Benz logo trademarks in gilded plate brass inset into the center console. It was offered with both rear-wheel drive and all-wheel drive (4Matic) in some markets, but was only offered with 4Matic for the US market, like the standard CL 550.

The US model went on sale in summer of 2009.

=== Engines ===
Petrol engines
Model	Years	Displacement	Type/code	Power at rpm	Torque at rpm
CL 500*	2006–2010	5,461 cc (333.3 cu in)	V8 (M 273 KE 55)	388 PS (285 kW; 383 hp) at 6,000	530 N⋅m (391 lbf⋅ft) at 2,800–4,800
CL 500 4MATIC*	2006–2010	5,461 cc (333.3 cu in)	V8 (M 273 KE 55)	388 PS (285 kW; 383 hp) at 6,000	530 N⋅m (391 lbf⋅ft) at 2,800–4,800
CL 600	2006–2010	5,513 cc (336.4 cu in)	V12 twin turbo (M 275 E 55 AL)	517 PS (380 kW; 510 hp) at 5,000	830 N⋅m (612 lbf⋅ft) at 1,900–3,500
CL 63 AMG	2006–2010	6,208 cc (378.8 cu in)	V8 (M 156 E 63)	525 PS (386 kW; 518 hp) at 6,800	630 N⋅m (465 lbf⋅ft) at 5,200
CL 65 AMG	2006–2010	5,980 cc (365 cu in)	V12 twin turbo (M 275 E 60 AL)	612 PS (450 kW; 604 hp) at 4,800–5,100	1,000 N⋅m (738 lbf⋅ft) at 2,000–4,000

BlueEFFICIENCY models include ECO start/stop function.

*CL 550 / CL 550 4MATIC in the United States.

=== Transmissions ===
Petrol engines
Model	Years	Types
CL 500	2006–2010	7-speed automatic (7G-TRONIC)
CL 500 4MATIC	2006–2010	7-speed automatic (7G-TRONIC)
CL 600	2006–2010	5-speed automatic (5G-TRONIC)
CL 63 AMG	2006–2010	7-speed automatic (7G-TRONIC)
CL 65 AMG	2006–2010	5-speed automatic (5G-TRONIC)

=== Performance ===
Model	0–100 km/h (62 mph) (sec)	Top speed (electronically limited)
CL 500	5.4	250 km/h (155 mph)
CL 500 4MATIC	5.4	250 km/h (155 mph)
CL 600	4.6	250 km/h (155 mph)
CL 63 AMG	4.6	250 km/h (155 mph) 300 km/h (186 mph) (with optional "AMG Driver's Package")
CL 65 AMG	4.4	250 km/h (155 mph) 300 km/h (186 mph) (with optional "AMG Driver's Package")

=== Equipment ===
AMG body styling (including front bumper with enlarged air intakes, chrome-ringed circular fog lamps, two slanted struts and a smooth transition to the prominent wheel arches, AMG side skirts, AMG rear apron, rear bumper with its black insert and chrome trim strip flanked by tailpipes on either side), AMG light-alloy wheels (includes 19-inch five-spoke wheels (8.5/9.5-wide) with embossed AMG lettering, high-sheen rim flange and spokes, 255/40 (front) and 275/40 (rear) tyres) went on sale in September 2006, for CL 500 and CL 600.

==== New features ====
The Pre-Safe Brake had its world premiere on the CL-Class C216, with the first partial autonomous braking (40%, or up to 0.4g deceleration) if the driver does not react to the BAS Plus warnings and the system detects a severe danger of an accident. If the driver then immediately applied the brakes, the maximum braking force was available and – depending on the situation – the accident could be averted at the last moment. If an accident was unavoidable, the PRE-SAFE brakes reduced the impact severity and, in turn, the risk of injury to the vehicle occupants.

The Distronic Plus adaptive cruise control is able to bring the car to a complete stop, and accelerate again to the pre-set speed, to keep a pre-set distance away from the car ahead of it. Also introduced was active infrared Night View Assist, enabling drivers to view the conditions in front of the car despite the dark surroundings. Intelligent Light System headlights with five light modes, including active light function, was another feature.

In 2007, the CL added the first Mercedes-Benz Blind Spot Assist system (includes six short-range radar sensors in the front and rear bumpers). This was available as an option for the CL-Class.

An AMG Sports package for the 2009 CL-Class was available for the CL 500 and CL 500 4MATIC beginning in June 2009. This package includes a front apron with large air intakes, rear apron with a black insert and integrated rectangular tailpipe trim in polished stainless steel, AMG side sill panels, 19-inch five-spoke AMG light-alloy wheels and wide-base 255/40 (front) and 275/40 (rear) tyres (optional 20-inch twin-spoke AMG light-alloy wheels with 255/35 and 275/35 tyres), perforated brake discs and silver-painted brake calipers with Mercedes-Benz lettering (V8/V12 engine models), wood trim and wood/leather steering wheel in black ash, velour floor mats with AMG lettering, and sports pedals in brushed stainless steel with rubber studs.

From 2009, Mercedes-Benz has only been offering the CL 550 in 4Matic in the US/Canada, as a strategy to increase sales in snowy regions. While all the systems are the same, the suspension has been downgraded from ABC to Airmatic, as 4Matic is not compatible with ABC. The CL 600 and CL 65 AMG remained rear-wheel drive, though.

=== Marketing ===
As part of the CL-Class launch, Mercedes-Benz Accessories GMBH released accessories for the CL-Class, including a leather wallet and business card case in black nappa based on the trim in the CL's interior, ash timber pens and umbrella handle based on the wood trim found in the car's interior, driving gloves and instrumentation-inspired wristwatch, keyring and money clip with the MB logo, and a diecast model car made by AUTOart. The accessories were available beginning in September 2006.

== 2010 facelift ==
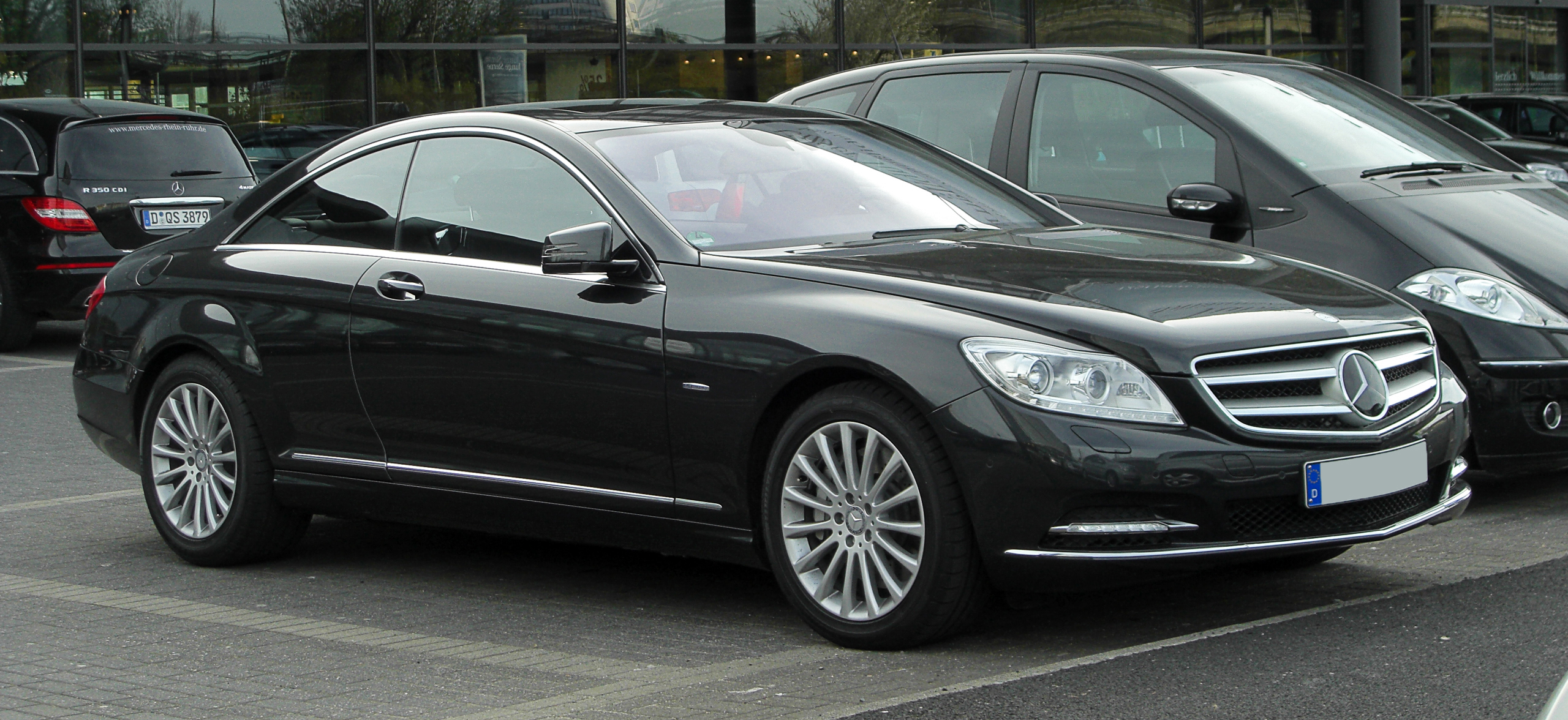
Facelift Mercedes-Benz CL 500 BlueEFFICIENCY (Germany)

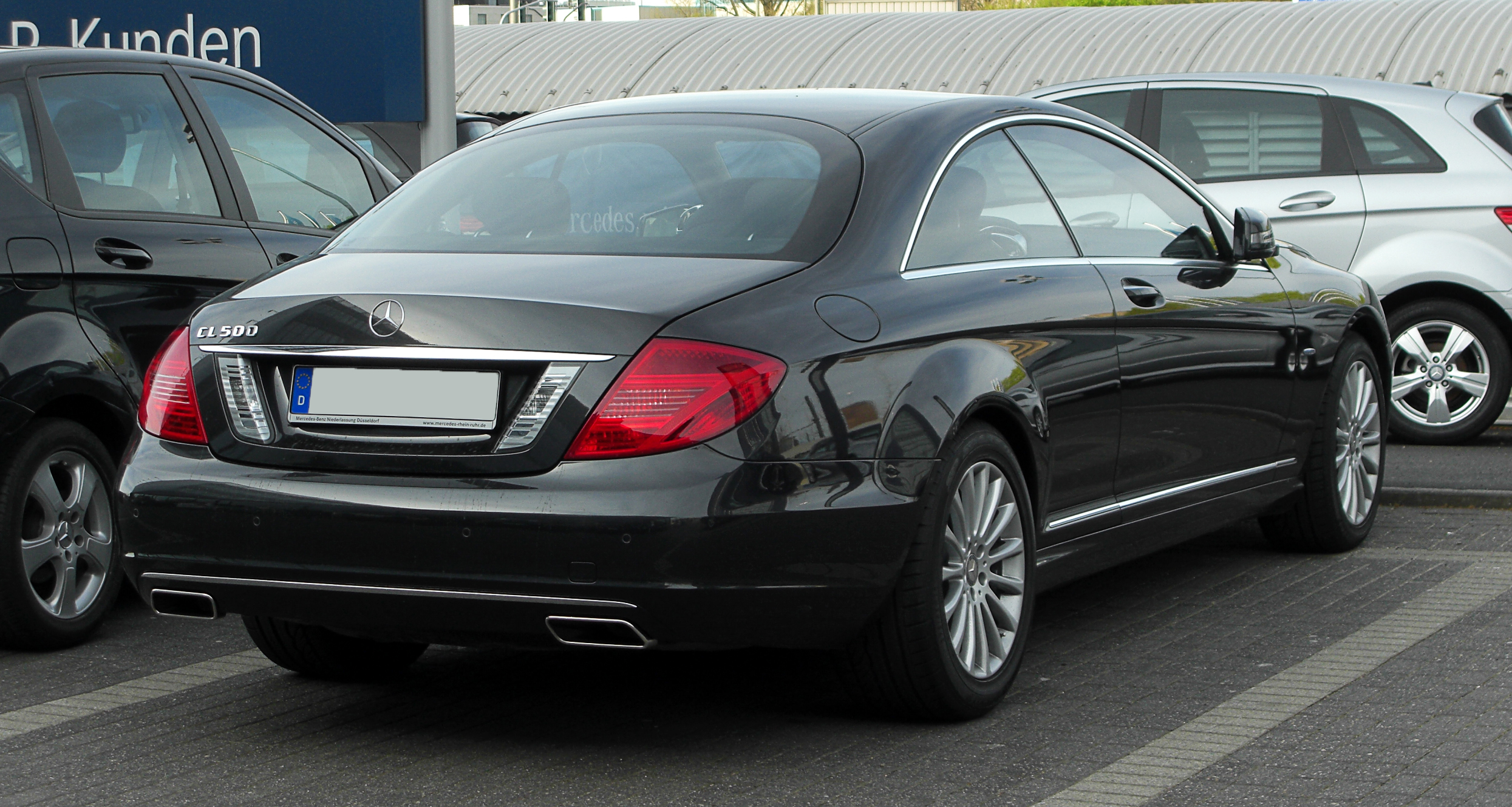
Facelift Mercedes-Benz CL 500 BlueEFFICIENCY (Germany)

The 2010 facelift was unveiled at the 2010 Goodwood Festival of Speed, followed by the 2010 Paris Motor Show.

Changes include:

- Exterior and interior: new grille, bi-xenon headlights with LED technology, LED fog lamps, revised fenders and hood, and new exhaust pipes, addition of a new interior wood trim
- Adaptive Highbeam Assist
- Attention Assist
- Active Blind Spot Assist world premiere
- Active Lane Keeping Assist world premiere
- 2011: first series production car with night vision-guided pedestrian spotlighting: Night View Assist Plus with Spotlight Function can flash at any pedestrians it detects in order to warn both the driver and the pedestrians. The flashing light is directed in such a way that vehicles in front and oncoming traffic are not dazzled.
- PRE-SAFE Brake upgrade now activates maximum braking pressure around 0.6 seconds before what it recognises as an unavoidable collision.
- Direct-Steer
- Active Body Control (ABC) with crosswind stabilisation
- Torque Vectoring Brake
- COMAND with SPLITVIEW dual view display.
- COMAND APS navigation system replaces DVD with 40 gigabyte hard-disk drive map.

=== Equipment ===
- Active Body Control suspension (standard, only on rear-wheel drive, for US market only on CL 600 and AMG)

The C216 introduced the second generation Active Body Control suspension system, referred to as ABC Plus or ABC II in technical documentation. Compared to the first generation system used on the C215 and W220, the updated system featured shorter hydraulic lines for improved response, a redesigned pulsation damper mounted directly on the tandem pump, and reduced body roll by 45%.

- AIRMATIC air suspension with continuously Adaptive Damping System Plus (standard on US market CL 550 4MATIC, not for CL 600 and AMG)
- Nine airbags as standard
- ESP Dynamic Cornering Assist
- Traffic Sign Assist with Speed Limit Assist
- ATTENTION ASSIST (as standard)
- ADAPTIVE BRAKE (as standard)
- DISTRONIC PLUS
- Brake Assist system BAS PLUS
- NECK-PRO crash-responsive head restraints
- PRE-SAFE, PRE-SAFE Brake
- Active bonnet
- Active Lane Keeping Assist
- Bi-Xenon headlamps with Intelligent Light System and Adaptive Highbeam Assist
- Night View Assist PLUS
- Active Parking Assist
- Active Blind Spot Assist
- Crosswind Assist
- Torque Vectoring Brake
- Backup camera
- Electric parking brake with emergency braking function
- Direct-Steer Electromechanical steering with Steer Assist electromechanical steering power assistance

Early models include CL 500 BlueEFFICIENCY, CL 500 4MATIC BlueEFFICIENCY, CL 600.

US models arrived at Mercedes-Benz dealerships in November 2010 as 2011 model year vehicles. Early models include CL 550 4MATIC, CL 63 AMG.

=== CL 63 AMG (2010–2014) ===
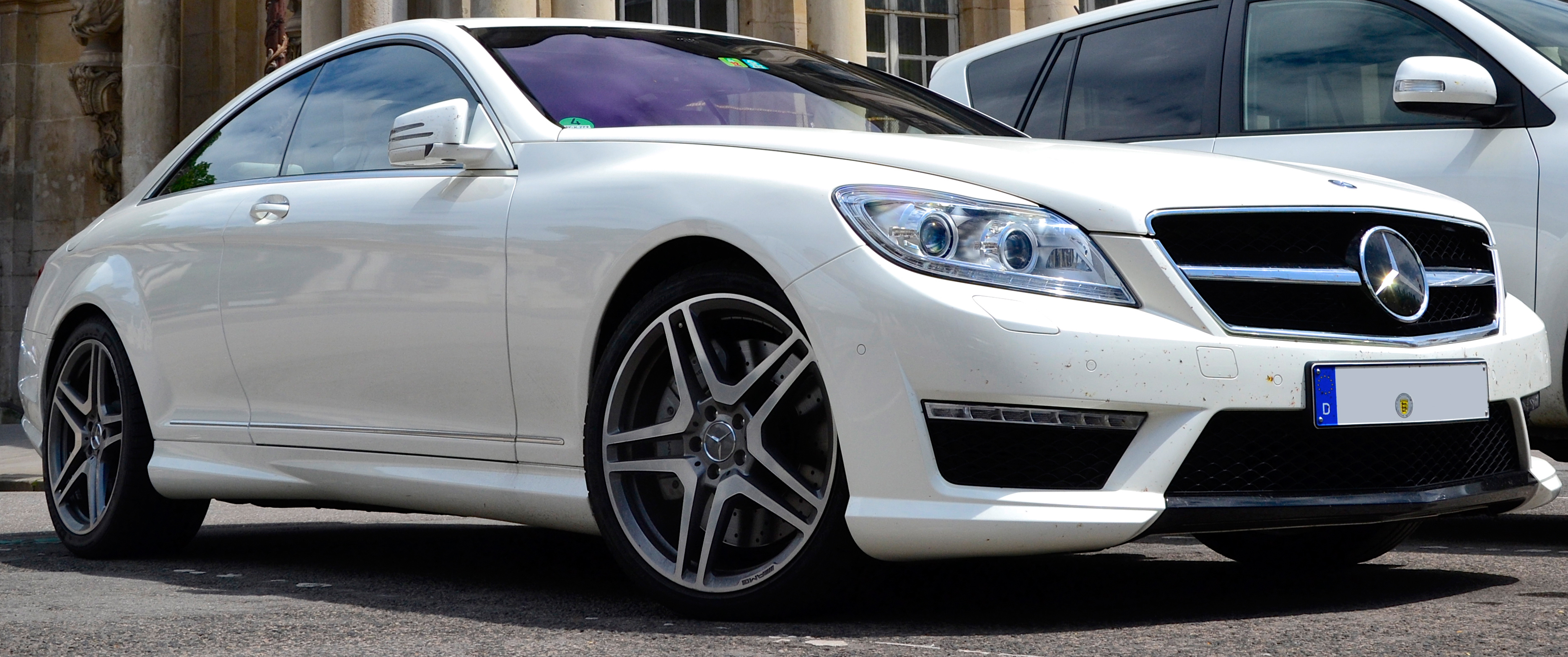
Facelift Mercedes-Benz CL 63 AMG

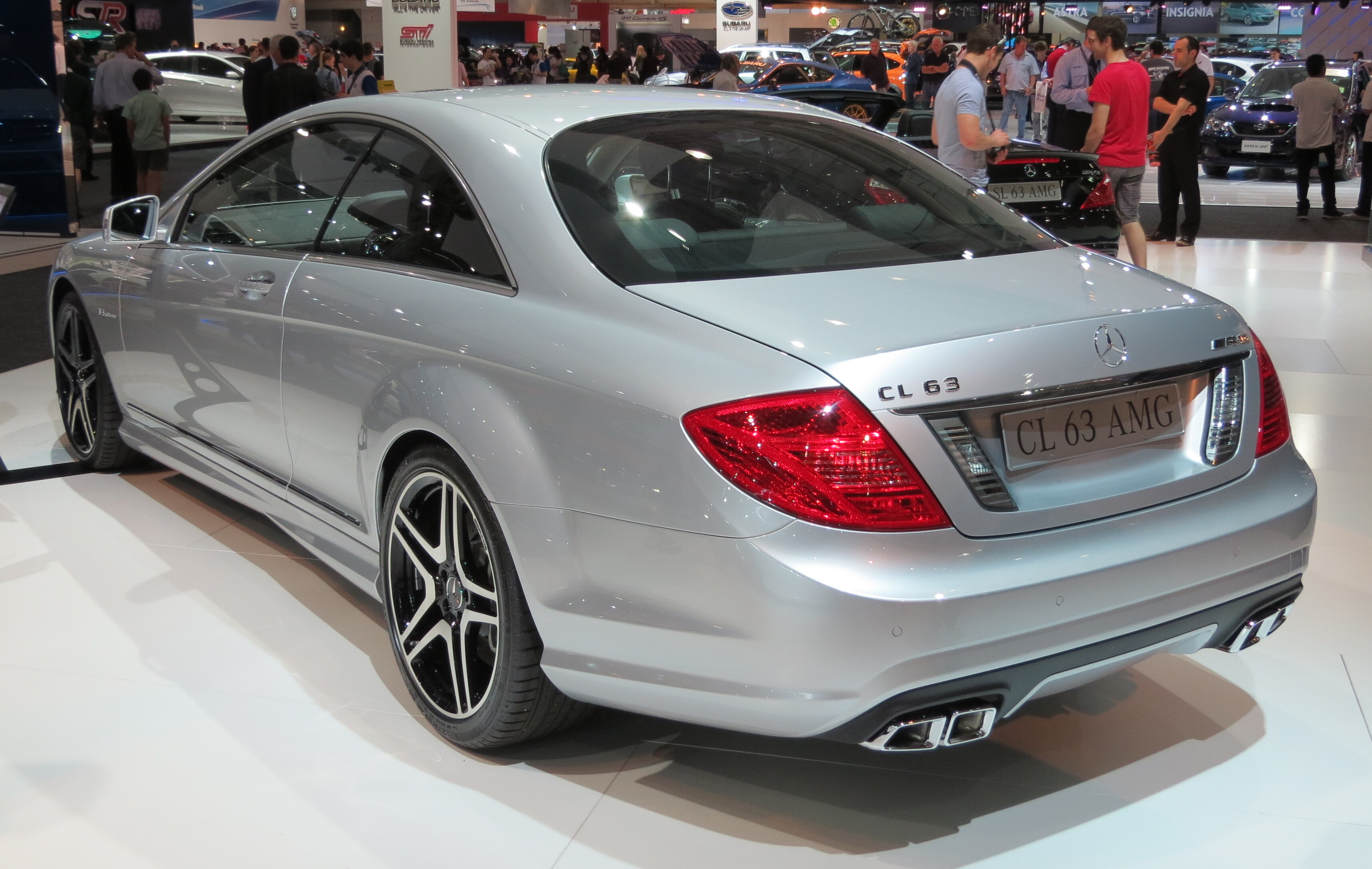
Facelift Mercedes-Benz CL 63 AMG

The facelifted version of the CL 63 AMG went on sale in 2010 and features an AMG 5.5-litre V8 biturbo engine rated at 544 PS (400 kW; 537 hp) at 5,500 rpm and 800 N⋅m (590 lbf⋅ft) at 2,000-4,500 rpm, paired to an AMG SPEEDSHIFT MCT 7-speed automatic transmission. It also features improved fuel efficiency over the previous CL 63 AMG, newly designed AMG bodystyling, "V8 Biturbo" lettering on the mudguards, AMG triple-spoke light-alloy wheels in titanium grey and with a high-sheen finish, 255/40 and 275/40 R 19 tyres, AMG sports steering wheel with silver-coloured aluminium shift paddles and specially shaped grip area covered with perforated nappa leather, "AMG V8 Biturbo" start screen in the AMG instrument cluster, optional SPLITVIEW for COMAND multimedia system, Direct-Steer system, Torque Vectoring Brake, crosswind stabilization, AMG high-performance braking system, optional Active Lane Keeping Assist and Active Blind-Spot Assist.

Other AMG Performance Studio options include:

- AMG Performance package: increase in maximum power by 100 PS (74 kW; 99 hp) and torque by 100 N⋅m (74 lbf⋅ft), genuine carbon fibre AMG engine cover
- AMG double-spoke forged wheels in titanium grey with a mirror finish with 255/35 R 20 (front) and 275/35 R 20 (rear) tyres
- AMG double-spoke forged wheels, in black with a mirror finish with 255/35 R 20 (front) and 275/35 R 20 (rear) tyres
- AMG Exterior Carbon package
- AMG performance steering wheel in leather/Alcantara
- AMG carbon-fibre trim elements

Other options include designo products (including exclusive paint finishes, leather upholstery, trim elements and steering wheels), designo Selection.

The vehicle went on sale in September 2010. US models arrived at Mercedes-Benz dealerships in November 2010 as 2011 model year vehicles.

=== CL 65 AMG (2010–2014) ===
The facelifted version of the CL 65 AMG was introduced in 2010, with engine power increased to 630 PS (463 kW; 621 hp) at 4,800 rpm and 1,000 N⋅m (738 lbf⋅ft) at 2,300-4,300 rpm, reduction in fuel consumption via regenerative braking for battery management of both the on-board electrical system and generator, reduced emissions via new piston rings, a modified oil pump and use of a superior coating on the catalytic converters; AMG SPEEDSHIFT five-speed automatic transmission with three different drive modes, AMG sports suspension based on Active Body Control (ABC) with Torque Vectoring Brake, crosswind stabilisation, loading adjustment system, Direct-Steer system with speed-sensitive power steering, AMG high-performance braking system based on the ADAPTIVE BRAKE system (390 and 365 millimetres diameter ventilated and perforated composite brake discs, double floating front and sliding frame-type rear brake callipers), profiled bonnet, enlarged and more angled radiator grille, Intelligent Light System (ILS) (bi-xenon headlamps with active light function, Adaptive Highbeam Assist and AMG-specific LED daytime driving lights in the front apron), enlarged chrome-trimmed cooling-air intake with horizontal grille slat, V-shape and the lower cross strut with exclusive chrome-look finish, AMG rear apron with a chrome diffuser insert, taillamps with one-piece red-coloured cover plates, reversing headlamps placed next to the licence plate recess, AMG sports exhaust system with two chrome twin tailpipes featuring a V12 design, "V12 BITURBO" lettering on the mudguard, AMG double-spoke forged wheels in titanium grey and with a high-sheen finish, 255/35 R 20 front 275/35 R 20 rear tyres, exclusive PASSION nappa leather upholstery with V12 diamond pattern at seats and door centre panels, Nappa leather upholstery at instrument panel and seatback panels and magazine pockets and parcel shelf, Alcantara roof lining and A and C-pillars, AMG sports seats with alternate upholstery layout and active ventilation and heating and Seat Comfort package (front active multicontour seats with massage and dynamic functions, NECK-PRO luxury head restraints), PRE-SAFE positioning function at front seats, AMG sports steering wheel with silver-coloured aluminium shift paddles and perforated nappa leather in the grip area, COMAND APS multimedia system including Harman Kardon Logic 7 surround sound system with SPLITVIEW, AMG instrument cluster with "AMG V12 BITURBO" start screen and a 360-km/h speedometer scale, a gear indicator including upshift recommendation at AMG main menu, RACETIMER with lap times tracking, exclusive analogue clock with IWC design and high-gloss poplar wood trim elements.

AMG Performance Studio options include:

- AMG double-spoke forged wheels in black with a mirror finish and 255/35 R 20 (front) and 275/35 R 20 (rear) tyres
- AMG Exterior Carbon package
- AMG performance steering wheel in leather/Alcantara
- AMG carbon-fibre interior trim elements

Other options include designo products (including exclusive paint finishes, leather upholstery, trim elements and steering wheels), designo Selection.

The vehicle went on sale for 191,450 euros (excl. VAT)/227,825 euros (incl. 19% VAT). US models arrived at Mercedes-Benz dealerships in November 2010 as 2011 model year vehicles.

=== CL "Grand Edition" (2012–2014) ===
The CL "Grand Edition" is a version of the CL 500 BlueEFFICIENCY, CL 500 4MATIC BlueEFFICIENCY and CL 600 commemorating 60 years of the S-Class Coupé. Changes include a choice of 3 designo body colours (platinum black metallic, mocha black metallic and matt magno cashmere white), AMG Sports package 20-inch light-alloy wheels in a choice of five-spoke or filigree 10-spoke designs, a "Grand Edition" badge, a choice interior 3 aniline leather upholstery colours (designo aniline leather armagnac, designo aniline leather deep black, designo aniline leather porcelain), full range of CL trim finishes (including black ash and high-gloss burr walnut), Active Body Control (ABC) with crosswind stabilisation, drowsiness detection system ATTENTION ASSIST, PRE-SAFE automatic emergency braking, optional Active Blind Spot Assist, Active Lane Keeping Assist, and Adaptive Highbeam Assist systems.

The vehicle was unveiled in the 2012 Geneva Motor Show.

Japan models went on sale in September 2012, which included only CL 550 4MATIC BlueEFFICIENCY Grand Edition, with designo mocha black (17 units) or designo magno cashmere white (matte) (3 units) body colour, designo porcelain (leather) interior, black ash wood interior trim, AMG styling package (front spoiler, side and rear skirt), exclusive design 20-inch 5-spoke aluminium wheels, 'Grand Edition' side emblem and designo floor mats.

=== Engines ===
Petrol Twin-turbo
Model	Years	Displacement	Type/code	Power at rpm	Torque at rpm
CL 500 BlueEFFICIENCY	2010–2014	4,663 cc (4.7 L; 284.6 cu in)	V8 twin turbo (M278 DE 46 AL)	435 PS (320 kW; 429 hp) at 5,250	700 N⋅m (516 lbf⋅ft) at 1,800–3,500
CL 500 4MATIC BlueEFFICIENCY	2010–2014	4,663 cc (4.7 L; 284.6 cu in)	V8 twin turbo (M278 DE 46 AL)	435 PS (320 kW; 429 hp) at 5,250	700 N⋅m (516 lbf⋅ft) at 1,800–3,500
CL 600	2010–2014	5,513 cc (5.5 L; 336.4 cu in)	V12 twin turbo (M275 E 55 AL)	517 PS (380 kW; 510 hp) at 5,000	830 N⋅m (612 lbf⋅ft) at 1,800–3,500
CL 63 AMG	2010–2014	5,461 cc (5.5 L; 333.3 cu in)	V8 twin turbo (M157 DE 55 AL)	544 PS (400 kW; 537 hp) at 5,500; AMG Performance package: 571 PS (420 kW; 563 hp) at 5,500	800 N⋅m (590 lbf⋅ft) at 2,000–4,500; AMG Performance package: 900 N⋅m (664 lbf⋅ft) at 2,000–4,500
CL 65 AMG	2010–2014	5,980 cc (6.0 L; 364.9 cu in)	V12 twin turbo (M275 E 60 AL)	630 PS (463 kW; 621 hp) at 4,800	1,000 N⋅m (738 lbf⋅ft) at 2,300–4,300 (max.) 1,200 N⋅m (885 lbf⋅ft)

BlueEFFICIENCY models include ECO start/stop function.

The CL 500 was sold as CL 550 in the US and Japan.

=== Transmissions ===
Petrol engines
Model	Years	Types
CL 500 BlueEFFICIENCY	2010–2014	7-speed automatic (7G-TRONIC)
CL 500 4MATIC BlueEFFICIENCY	2010–2014	7-speed automatic (7G-TRONIC)
CL 600 BlueEFFICIENCY	2010–2014	5-speed automatic (5G-TRONIC)
CL 63 AMG	2010–2014	7-speed sports (AMG SPEEDSHIFT MCT)
CL 65 AMG	2010–2014	5-speed automatic (AMG SPEEDSHIFT)

AMG SPEEDSHIFT MCT 7-speed sports transmission includes Controlled Efficiency ("C") drive mode, Controlled Efficiency stop/start function, "S" (Sport) mode with higher engine speed level in each gear, manual shift mode "M" with 100ms gearshifts and no automatic downshifts, electronic transmission control unit with its integrated 80 MHz processor. The electronic key for selection of the three driving models is located to the left of the COMAND controller.

=== Performance ===
Model	0–100 km/h (62 mph) (sec)	Top speed (electronically limited)
CL 500 BlueEFFICIENCY	4.9	250 km/h (155 mph)
CL 500 4MATIC BlueEFFICIENCY	4.9	250 km/h (155 mph)
CL 600	4.6 (4.0 R&T)	250 km/h (155 mph)
CL 63 AMG	4.5	250 km/h (155 mph) 300 km/h (186 mph) (with optional "AMG Driver's Package")
CL 63 AMG with AMG Performance package	4.4	250 km/h (155 mph) 300 km/h (186 mph) (with optional "AMG Driver's Package")
CL 65 AMG	4.4	250 km/h (155 mph) 300 km/h (186 mph) (with optional "AMG Driver's Package")

=== Production ===
The 2011 and 2012 model years of the CL 550 4MATIC and CL 63 AMG were recalled for cracked fuel filter flange leading to fire if an external ignition source is present. The recall campaign was expected to begin in January 2013.

The CL-Class was replaced by the S-Class Coupé. Production ended in December 2013.
