= M275 =

M275 may refer to:

- M275 motorway, a short motorway in Hampshire, southern England
- Mercedes-Benz M275 engine, an automobile engine
- M275 truck, a US military vehicle
