= Mercedes-Benz CL-Class (C215) =

Mercedes-Benz CL (C215)
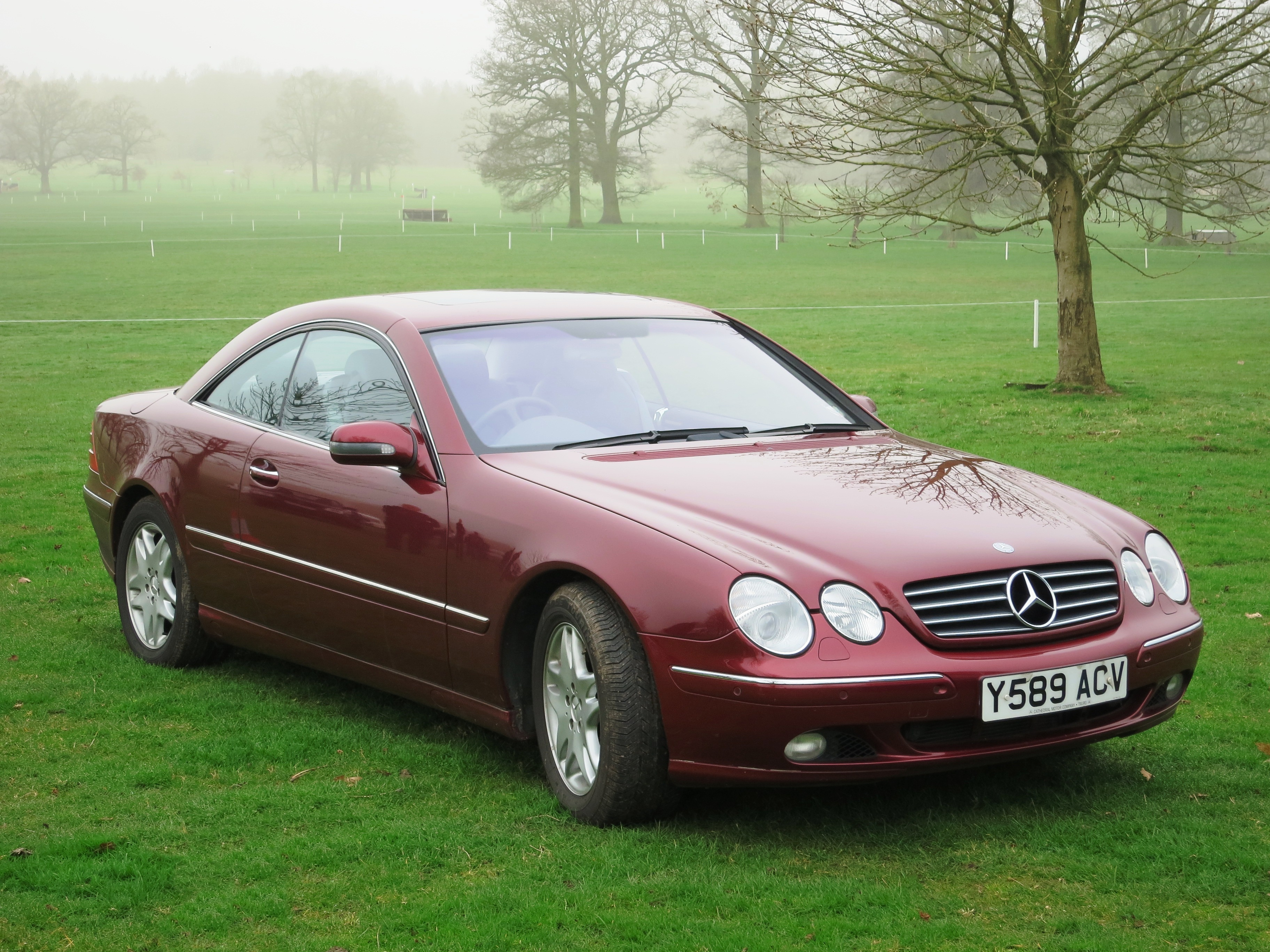

Overview
- Manufacturer: DaimlerChrysler
- Production: June 1998 – February 2006
- Assembly: Germany: Sindelfingen
- Designer: Peter Arcadipane; Bruno Sacco (1995)

Body and chassis
- Class: Grand tourer (S)
- Body style: 2-door coupé
- Layout: Front-engine, rear-wheel-drive
- Related: Mercedes-Benz S-Class (W220)

Powertrain
- Engine: Petrol: 5.0 L M113 V8; 5.4 L M113 V8; 5.4 L M113 supercharged V8; 5.5 L M275 twin-turbo V12; 5.8 L M137 V12; 6.0 L M275 twin-turbo V12; 6.3 L M137 V12
- Transmission: 5-speed 5G-Tronic automatic; 7-speed 7G-Tronic automatic

Dimensions
- Wheelbase: 2,885 mm (113.6 in)
- Length: 4,993 mm (196.6 in)
- Width: 1,857 mm (73.1 in)
- Height: 1,390–1,408 mm (54.7–55.4 in)
- Curb weight: 1,865–2,155 kg (4,112–4,751 lb)

Chronology
- Predecessor: Mercedes-Benz C140
- Successor: Mercedes-Benz C216

The second generation of the Mercedes-Benz CL-Class used the C215-chassis designation and was manufactured and marketed by German automaker Mercedes from 1998–2006 as the company's flagship model, a two-door, four-passenger coupé.

Based on the 1998–2005 W220 S-Class, it uses an 8-inch (203 mm) shorter wheelbase. Its unique unibody construction used a steel floor pan, chassis rails and A pillars along with a bonded aluminium roof and rear wing sections, magnesium door frames and composite plastic used for the boot/trunk and front wings.

Sales in Germany started in August 1999 for the CL 500 V8 model.

The exterior design and active suspension for the C215 were previewed by the Mercedes-Benz F200 concept in 1996.

Model variants included the:

- CL 500 with a naturally-aspirated (NA) V8 (1999–2006)
- CL 55 AMG with a naturally-aspirated V8 (2000–2002)
- CL 600 with a naturally-aspirated V12 (2000–2002)
- CL 55 AMG with a supercharged V8 (2003–2006)
- CL 600 with a 5.5 litre Bi-Turbo V12 (limited production, about 200 per year worldwide) (2003–2006)
- CL 55 AMG F1 Edition with a naturally-aspirated V8 (55 examples only) (2000)
- CL 63 AMG (limited production, 26 examples only) (2001)
- CL 65 AMG with a 6.0 litre Bi-Turbo V12 (limited production, 196 total) (2004–2006)

The CL has a drag coefficient of Cd=0.28 for regular models and 0.29 for the AMG models.

== Features and equipment ==
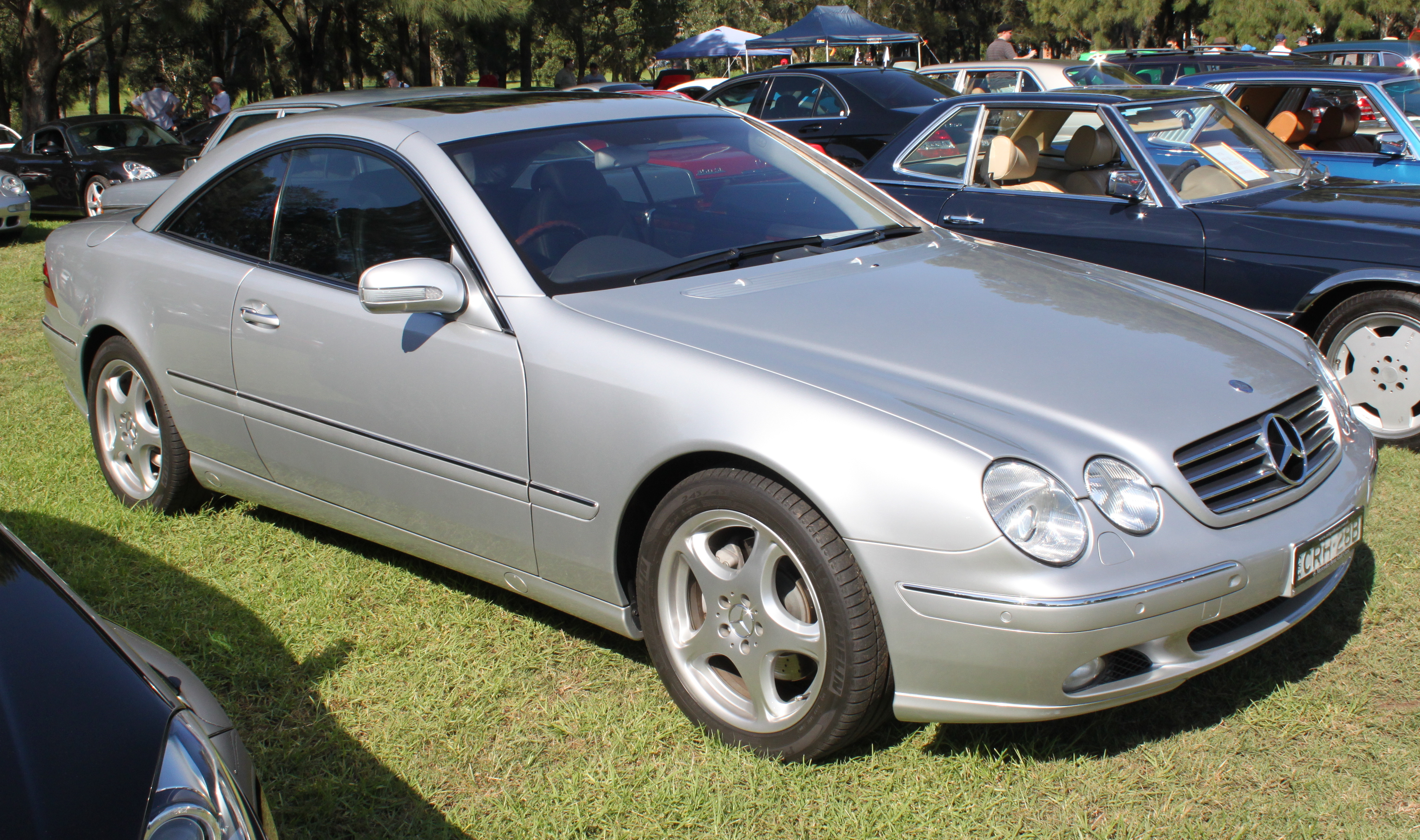
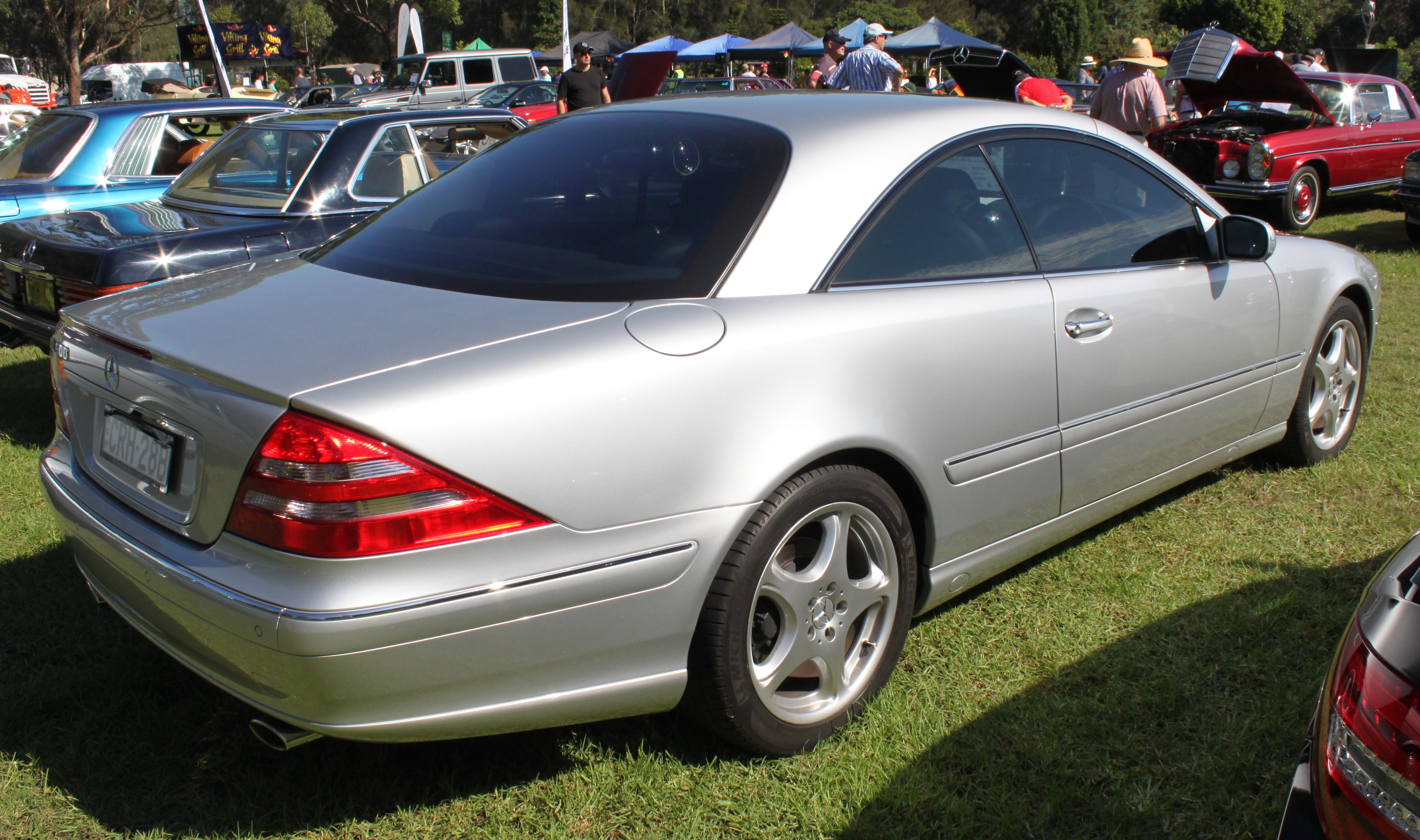
CL 500 (early version).

Like the previous generation CL, the C215 features a pillarless design with no B pillar between the front and rear side windows. The C215 CL-Class was the second car (after the W220 S-Class) with Distronic: the first worldwide radar-assisted autonomous cruise control system. It was the first car in the world with both low beam and high beam (Bi-Xenon) High Intensity Discharge headlamps.

The Active Body Control (ABC) hydropneumatic active suspension was standard on the C215 CL-Class. This keeps the car leveled even in fast corners, and also provides a comfort and sports setting. Driver controls can enable the system to increase the car's ground clearance in three increments for driving on difficult terrain. The suspension will lower the vehicle automatically at higher speeds. The W220 S-Class sibling had standard Airmatic air suspension (a semi-active suspension system) across the range with ABC as an option, although ABC was included as standard on top-performing trims. Other drivetrain differences from the W220 included no availability of 4Matic, and no diesel engines (inline-6 or V6) nor V6 petrol engines on the C215.

From 1999 through 2003, the V12-equipped cars featured a cylinder deactivation system called Active Cylinder Control. This system allowed the CL 600 to achieve better fuel economy than the comparable CL 500. The system will automatically activate when the car is at operating temperature, below a certain load threshold and will deactivate once the driver demands more power. The activation and deactivation are both seamless. However, cylinder deactivation was dropped with the introduction of the 500 PS (368 kW; 493 hp) bi-turbo V12.

In addition to the disablement of fuel, the exhaust valves are mechanically uncoupled to keep pressure inside the cylinder at all times. This is done to prevent bank 2 from sucking in oil past the cylinder rings. The exhaust valves are uncoupled using two solenoids, driven by a separate pump on timing cover of the head of bank 2.

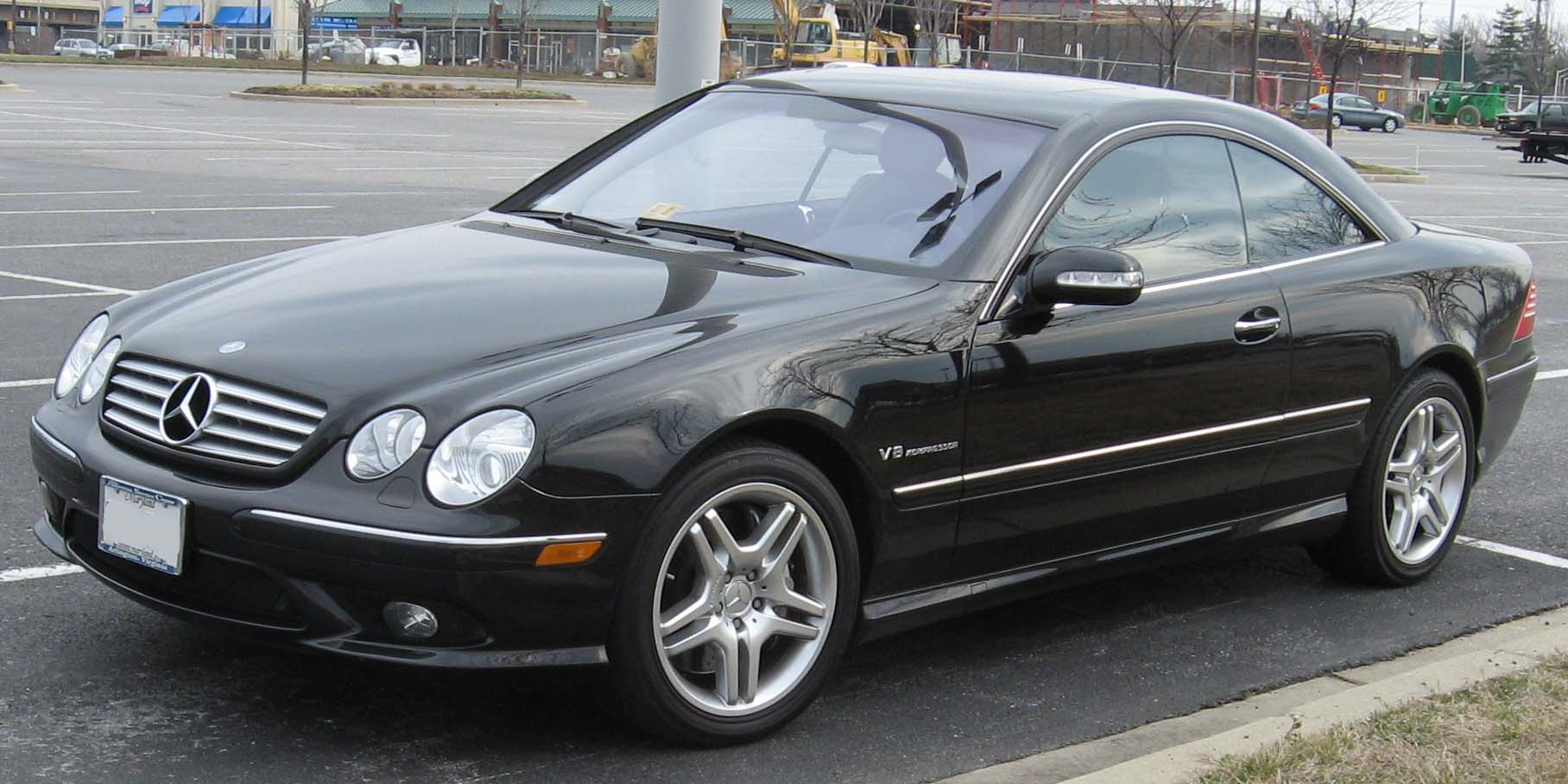
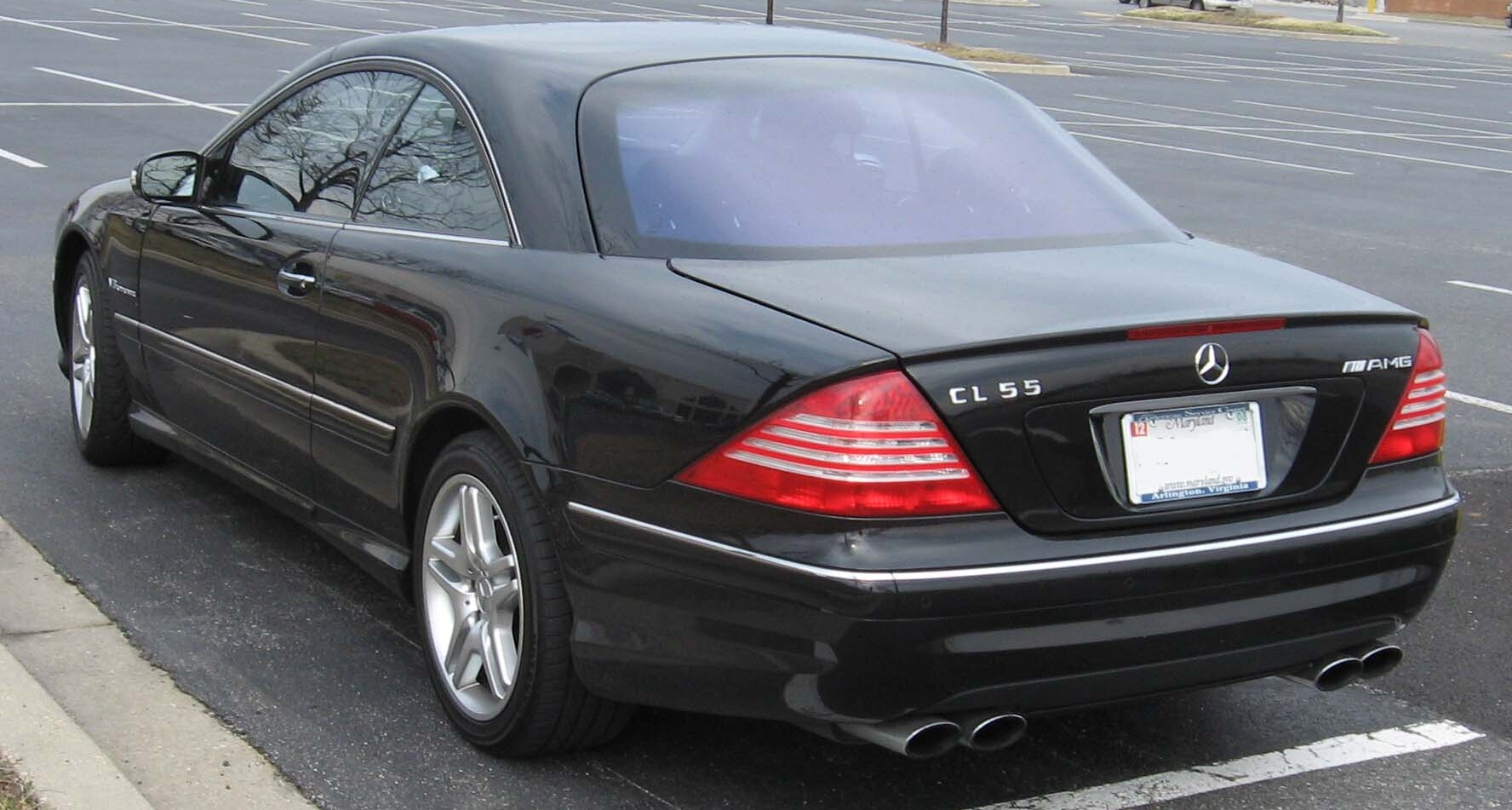
2003 CL 55 AMG

In 2003, the engine and transmission options were revised. The CL 55 AMG became supercharged, allowing the car to accelerate from 0-60 mph in 4.27 seconds according to Motor Trend, and the V12 CL 600 gained twin turbochargers, added along with a slight reduction in engine displacement, from 5,786 cc (5.8 L) to 5,513 cc (5.5 L). Both engines are rated at 500 PS (368 kW; 493 hp). The more powerful CL 65 has a power output of 612 PS (450 kW; 604 hp). 2003 also saw the introduction of a 7-speed 7G-Tronic automatic transmission for the CL 500 variant only, and a switch for all CL models to a DVD-based navigation system vs the CD-based COMAND system.

Cars with the Designo option were available in exclusive colours and with custom interior appointments, including an optional natural stone veneer.

=== Safety ===
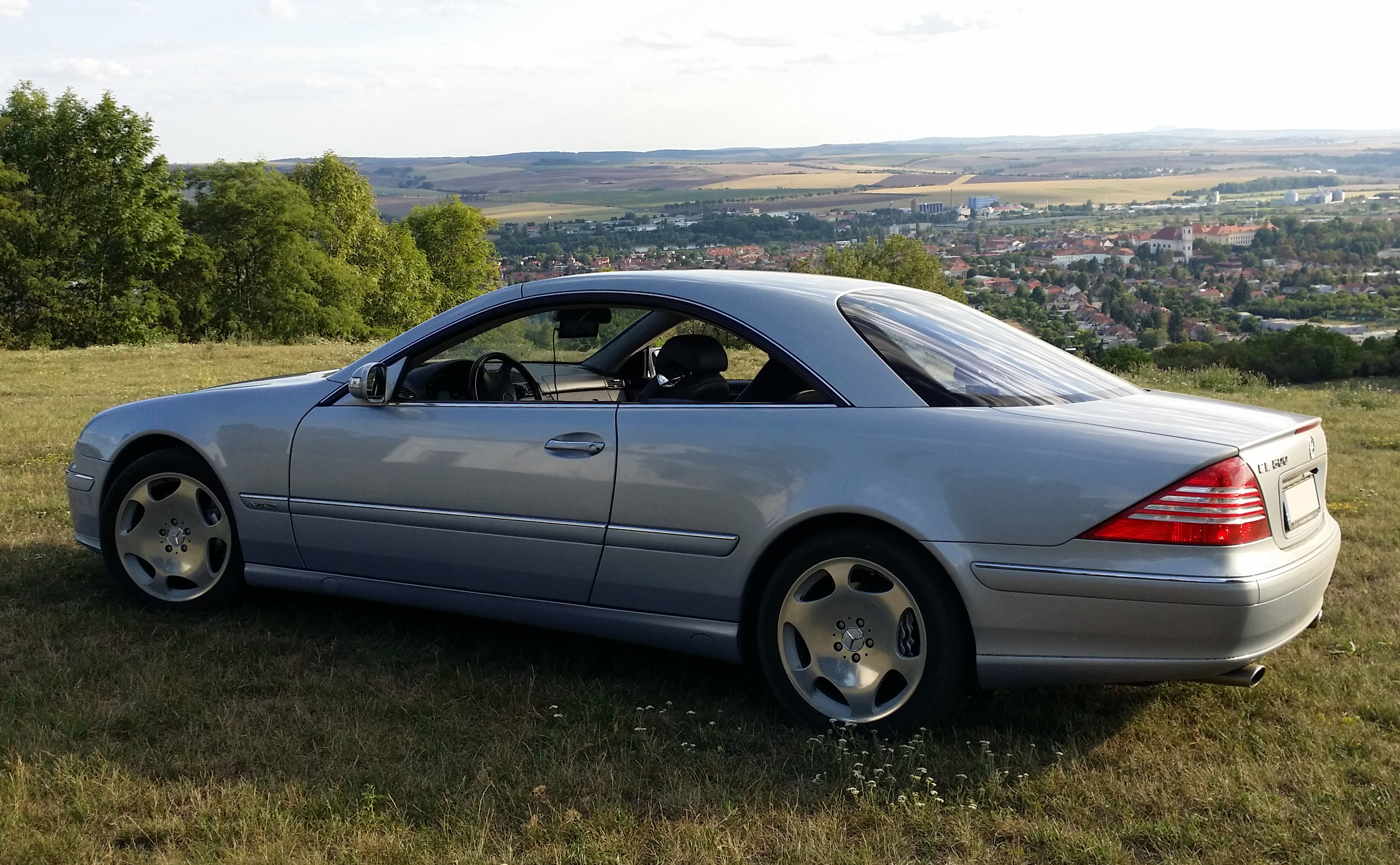
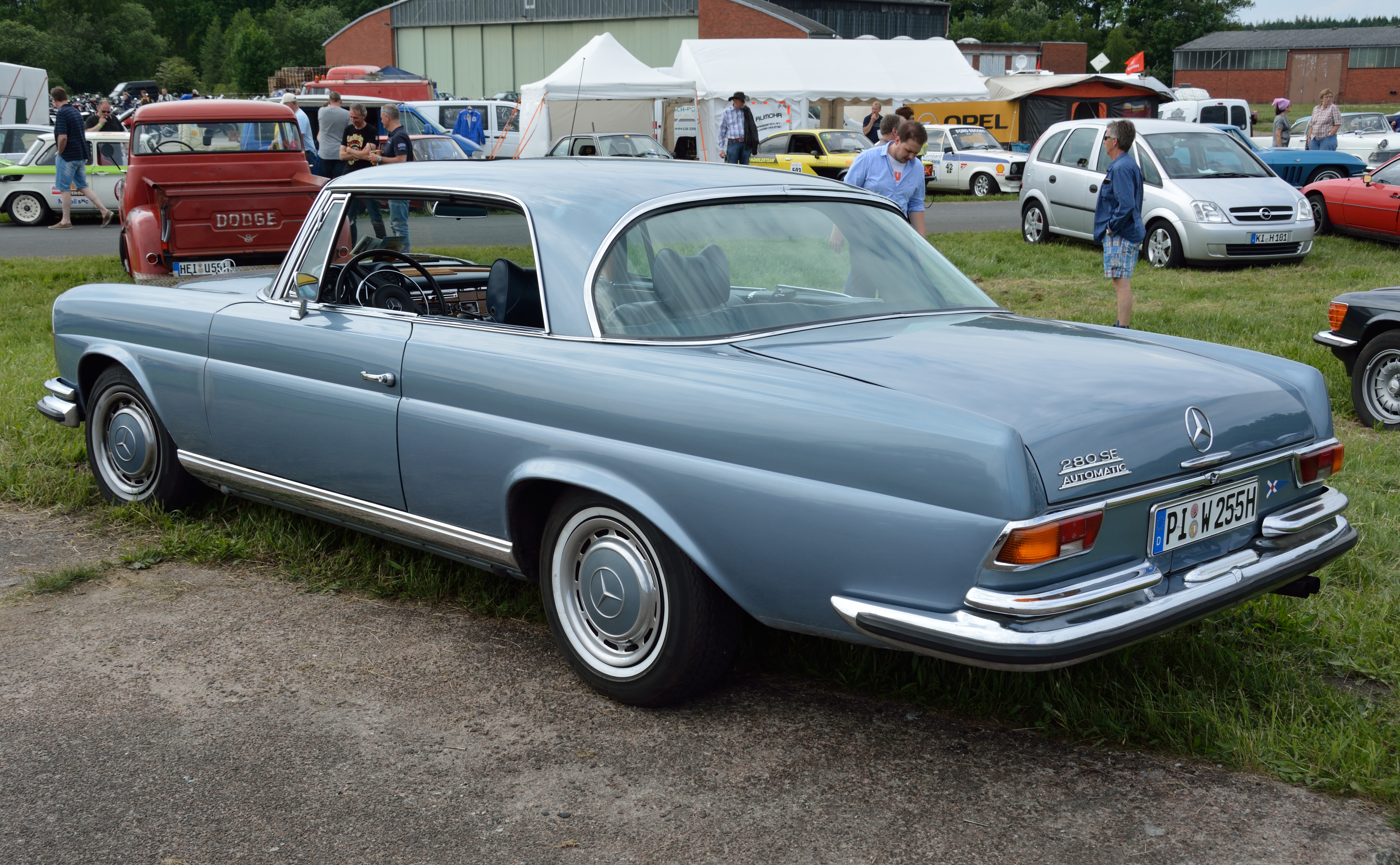
The roofline of the CL was inspired by the W111 Coupé

Standard safety equipment included front and rear side curtain airbags. In total, the C215 features 8 airbags: 2 frontal (driver and passenger), 4 side airbags (one for each passenger, optional for rear seats) and 2 window-airbags. Additionally, the CL featured automatically height-adjusting rear shoulder belts and rear-seat head restraints that rose automatically when the rear seat belts were fastened. LED brake lights are also standard. In 2003, the cars were upgraded with the Pre-Safe precrash system.

=== Comfort and convenience ===
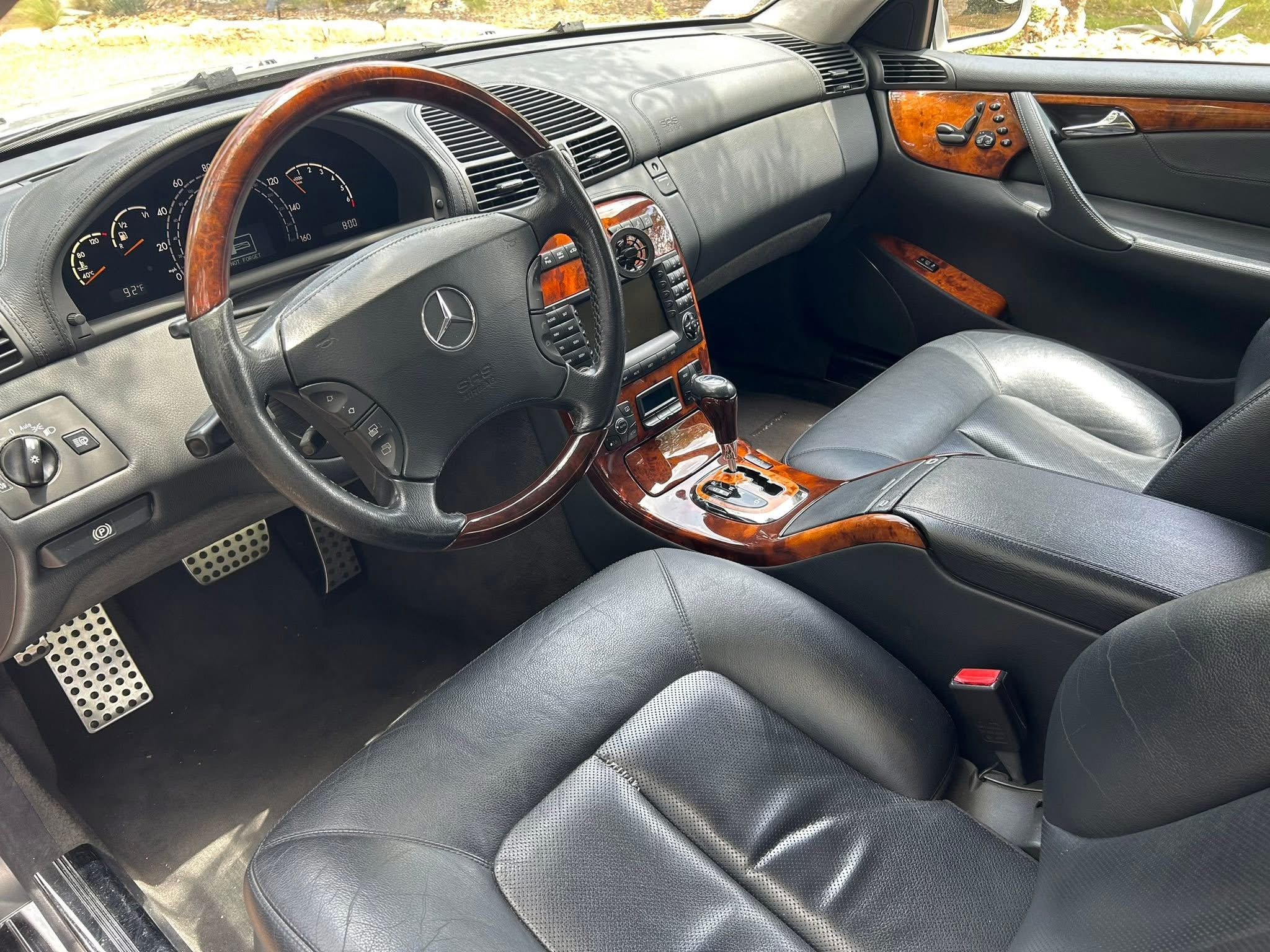
2005 CL 500 interior

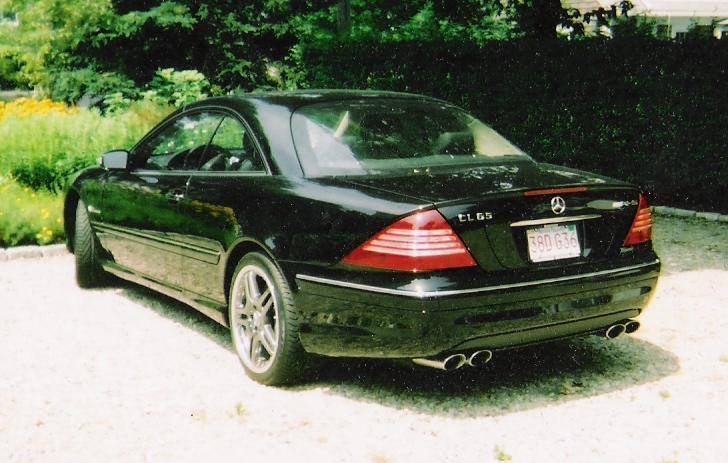
CL 65 AMG

Some notable comfort and convenience features of the CL include:

- Optional Distronic cruise control, which could maintain a set distance between the CL-Class and any vehicle in front.
- Speedtronic adjustable speed limiter for not exceeding a set speed on roads with speed limits.
- Optional Keyless Go, a smart key entry and startup system.
- Electrically adjustable and heated front seats as standard. Optional were the memory function for the seats (standard in many countries on the larger engine models), seat ventilation, and the multi-contour backrests with massage function.
- Power tilt/sliding glass sunroof (with rain-sensing from 2002 onwards)
- Summer Open/Close - Ability to open and close all four windows and the sunroof at the same time upon entry and/or exit from the vehicle.
- Rain-sensing windshield wipers.
- Light sensors to turn the headlights on and off automatically, depending on lighting circumstances. The instrument display and the COMAND screen's backlight and colour also adjust automatically depending on the ambient light situation.
- Parktronic visual and audible parking aid, with sensors in the front and rear bumpers. Also, the passenger side mirror can swivel down automatically when engaging reverse, to help see the curb.
- Automatically heated exterior mirrors with power folding and memory function.
- Fully automatic climate control system with pollen and charcoal filters and optional separate rear-seat climate controls.
- COMAND system combines the controls for audio systems, the television, the navigation and the telephone. COMAND based cars offer higher quality audio compared to the Audio 10 system.
- Optional Bose sound system with AudioPilot noise compensation.
- Trunk-mounted 6-disc CD changer
- Power rear-window sunshade, with one-touch up/down.
- Infrared reflective glass with laminated side windows
- Self opening trunk as standard, with an optional power-operated self opening and closing trunk offered.
- Soft-closing doors.
- Four-joint door hinges which open out and forwards
- Easy entry/exit function, and courtesy folding feature with obstruction sensor to access the rear seats
- Auto-dimming interior and driver's side exterior rear view mirrors to prevent being dazzled by cars behind.
- Bi-xenon headlamps
- Optional Linguatronic voice recognition system which can be used to control the audio system, navigation system, and a cellular telephone through voice commands.
- Integrated Motorola Timeport dual-band portable digital cellular phone with in-car voice control system (CL 600)

== Rare models ==
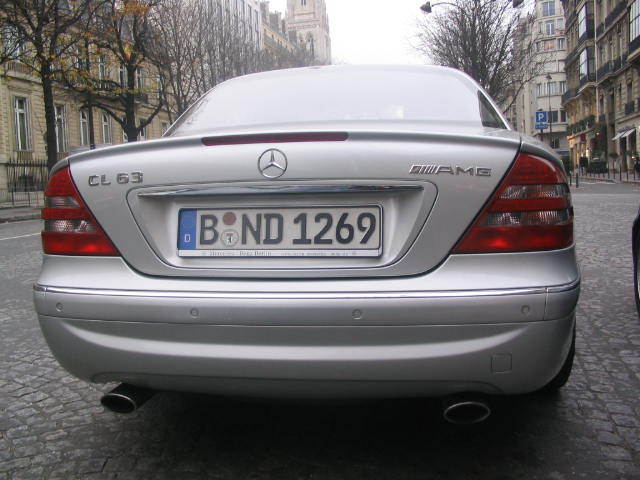
CL 63 AMG, one of only 26 produced.

The CL 63 AMG was based on the CL 600 V12 model and produced in limited quantities for one month. It was offered exclusively by AMG, only to selected customers in Europe and Asia, allegedly heads of state. The CL 63 AMG is the rarest C215 model produced, and only 26 examples were built in November 2001. Some were delivered in the UK, while one was delivered in France, registered in March 2002. They had a price of US$270,000. One was offered for sale in Warwick in 2022.

In 2000, Mercedes-Benz presented the CL 55 AMG F1 Limited Edition model. With production limited to only 55 numbered examples, they featured lighter carbon-ceramic brake discs (a world production car first) with special eight-piston Brembo calipers. The model was based on a standard naturally aspirated CL 55 AMG, with identical performance but better stopping power. It was available only in metallic silver with black and silver leather interior with an option of sports bucket seats. F1 Limited Edition logos can be found on the illuminated door sills and on the carbon-fibre finished centre console along with a series number.

== Engines ==
As with all major German manufacturers (except Porsche) Mercedes electronically limits their cars to a top speed of 250 km/h (155 mph).

	Engine	Transmission	Power at rpm	Torque at rpm	0–100 km/h (62 mph)	Top speed*	CO2 emissions g/km
CL 500 (1999)	5.0 L V8 M113	5-speed automatic (5G-Tronic)	225 kW (306 PS; 302 hp) at 5,500	460 N⋅m (339 lb⋅ft) at 2,700–4,250	6.5 seconds	250 km/h (155 mph)	285–320
CL 500 (2003)	5.0 L V8 M113	7-speed automatic (7G-Tronic)	225 kW (306 PS; 302 hp) at 5,600	460 N⋅m (339 lb⋅ft) at 2,700–4,250	6.3 seconds	250 km/h (155 mph)	
CL 600 (2000)	5.8 L V12 M137	5-speed automatic (5G-Tronic)	270 kW (367 PS; 362 hp) at 5,500	530 N⋅m (391 lb⋅ft) at 4,100	6.3 seconds	250 km/h (155 mph)	321
CL 600 (2003)	Twin-turbocharged; 5.5 L V12 M275	5-speed automatic (5G-Tronic)	368 kW (500 PS; 493 hp) at 5,000	800 N⋅m (590 lb⋅ft) at 1,800–3,500	4.8 seconds	250 km/h (155 mph)	353
CL 55 AMG (2000-2002)	5.4 L V8 M113	5-speed automatic (5G-Tronic)	265 kW (360 PS; 355 hp)	530 N⋅m (391 lb⋅ft) at 3,150–4,500	6.0 seconds	250 km/h (155 mph)	310
CL55 AMG (2003)	Supercharged; 5.4 L V8 M113	5-speed automatic (5G-Tronic)	368 kW (500 PS; 493 hp) at 6,100	700 N⋅m (516 lb⋅ft) at 2,750–4,000	4.8 seconds	250 km/h (155 mph)	317
CL 63 AMG	6.3 L V12 M137	5-speed automatic (5G-Tronic)	326 kW (443 PS; 437 hp) at 5,500	620 N⋅m (457 lb⋅ft) at 4,400	5.5 seconds	250 km/h (155 mph)	338
CL 65 AMG	Twin-turbocharged; 6.0L V12 M275 AMG	5-speed automatic (5G-Tronic)	450 kW (612 PS; 603 hp)	1,000 N⋅m (738 lb⋅ft)	4.4 seconds	250 km/h (155 mph)	357

== Production ==
According to Daimler, the C215 was produced in the following numbers:

- CL 500 (1998–2006) - 32,224
- CL 600 (1998–2002) - 6,348
- CL 600 (2002–2005) - 2,255
- CL 55 AMG (2000–2002) - 2,217
- CL 55 AMG (2002–2005) - 4,163
- CL 63 AMG (2001) - 26
- CL 65 AMG (2003–2005) - 777

Total production of the C215 CL-Class was 47,984 units (including the 63 AMG model).
