= Tramontana (sports car) =

Spanish sports car

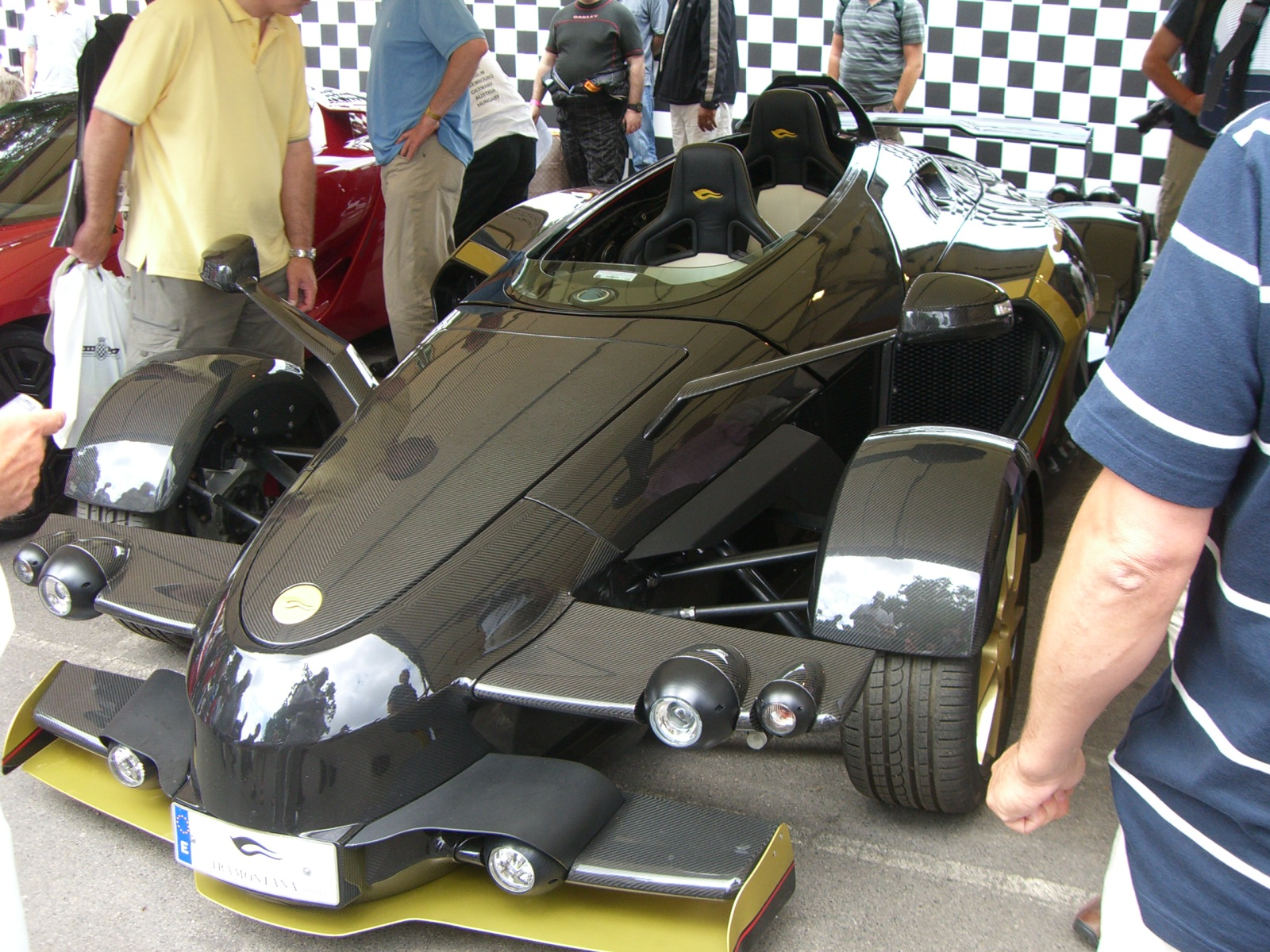

Overview
- Manufacturer: a.d. Tramontana
- Production: 2007-present
- Designer: Josep Rubau

Body and chassis
- Class: Sports car
- Body style: Single or two seater
- Layout: Longitudinal rear mid-engine, rear-wheel-drive
- Doors: Canopy

Powertrain
- Engine: 5.5 L Mercedes-AMG M285 bi-turbocharged V12
- Transmission: 6-speed sequential

Dimensions
- Length: 4,900 mm (192.9 in)
- Width: 2,080 mm (81.9 in)
- Height: 1,300 mm (51.2 in)
- Curb weight: 1,268 kg (2,795 lb)

The Tramontana is a Spanish single or twin-seat sports car with styling inspired by open wheel racing cars. It was created by Josep Rubau and it was built by Advanced Design Tramontana in Palau de Santa Eulalia, Girona, Catalonia (Spain), and costs €700,000 or more. It was launched as a concept at the 2005 Geneva Motor Show, and subsequently modified for production.

2009 Tramontana R
Tramontana R at Goodwood Festival of Speed 2009

It features a mid-mounted twin turbocharged Mercedes-Benz 5.5 litre, single overhead cam V12 engine producing 720 PS (530 kW; 710 hp). This is mated to a 6-speed sequential gearbox, sending power to the rear wheels, and giving it a top speed of 325 km/h (202 mph) and a 0–100 km/h (62 mph) time of 3.6 seconds. The body and interior are a mix of aluminium and carbon fibre, while the twenty-inch wheels are a mix of carbon fibre and magnesium.

The car weighs 1,268 kg (2,795 lb) and the suspension is an adjustable double wishbone suspension. If the two seat option is chosen, the passenger sits directly behind and slightly higher than the driver. The bonnet badge is made of solid white gold.

Reportedly, only 12 a year are manufactured. In 2009, Tramontana introduced a closed top model named Tramontana R.

== Gallery ==
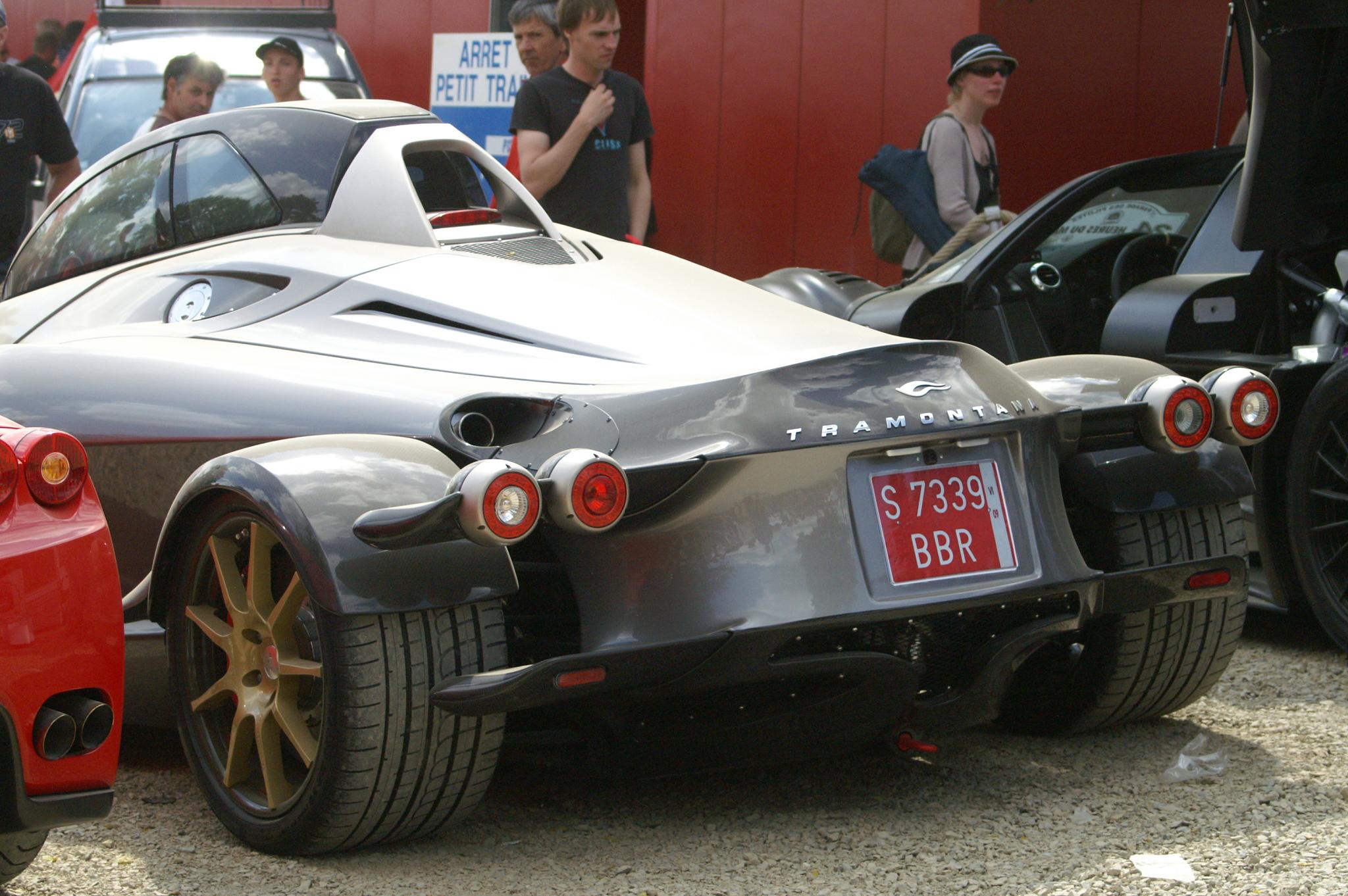
AD Tramontana rear

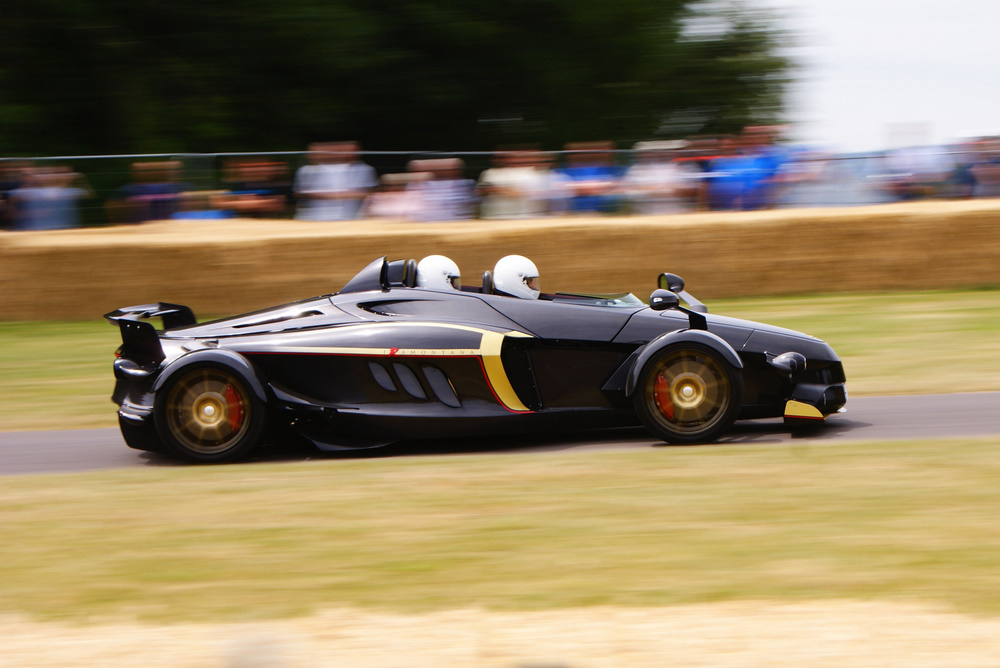
Tramontana two-seater at the 2009 Goodwood Festival of Speed

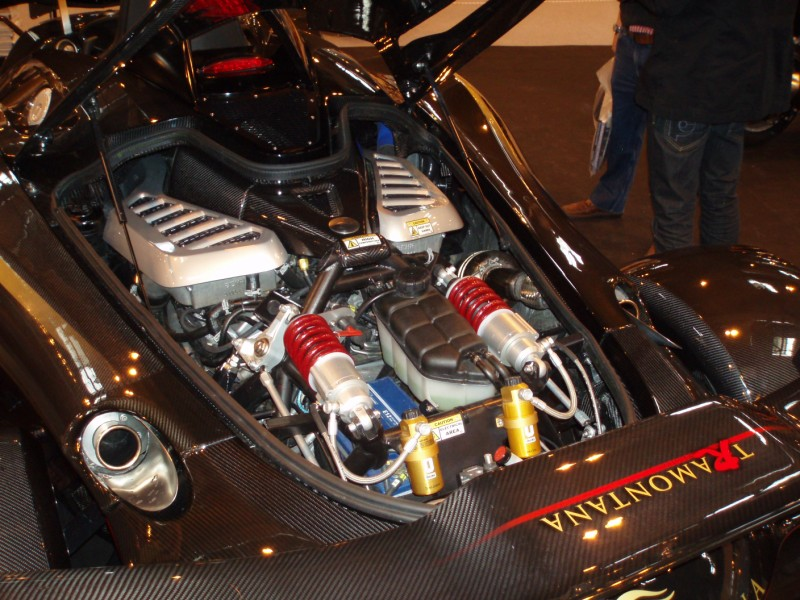
Tramontana engine bay

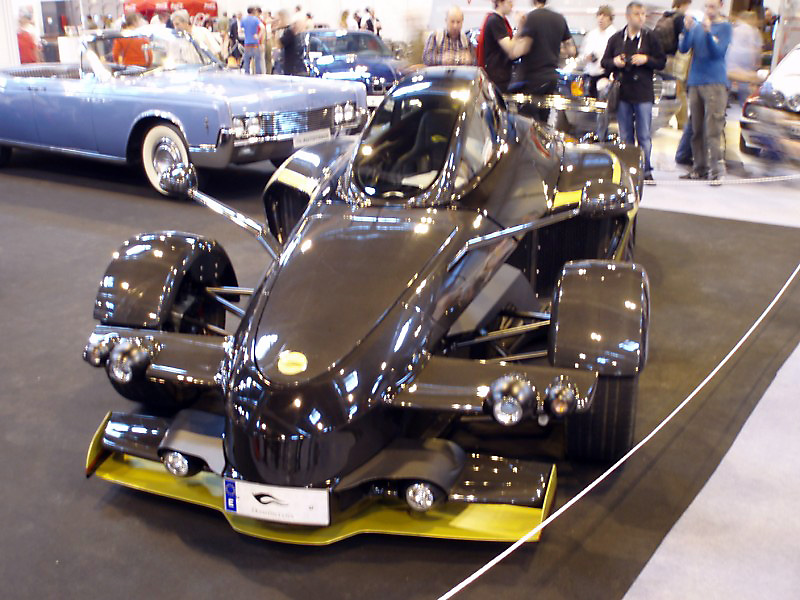
Tramontana R
