= Mercedes-Benz M137 engine =

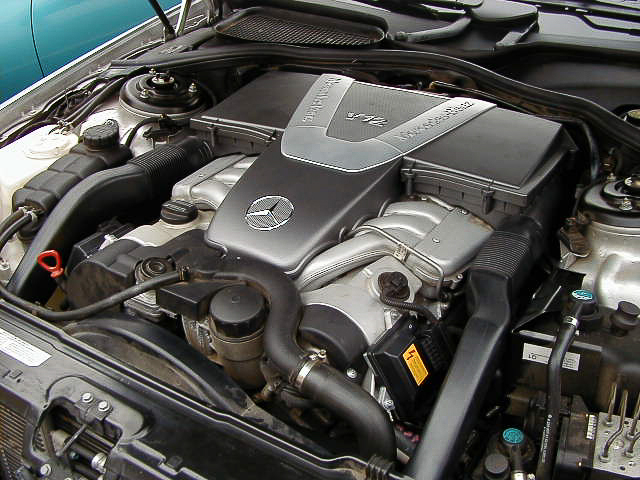

Overview
- Manufacturer: Mercedes-Benz
- Production: 1997–2002

Layout
- Configuration: 60° V12
- Displacement: 5.8 L; 353.1 cu in (5,786 cc); 6.3 L; 381.9 cu in (6,258 cc)
- Cylinder bore: 84 mm (3.31 in); 84.5 mm (3.33 in)
- Piston stroke: 87 mm (3.43 in); 93 mm (3.66 in)
- Cylinder block material: Aluminium
- Cylinder head material: Aluminium
- Valvetrain: SOHC 3 valves x cyl.
- Compression ratio: 10.0:1

Combustion
- Fuel system: Fuel injection
- Fuel type: Gasoline
- Oil system: Wet sump
- Cooling system: Water-cooled

Output
- Power output: 270 kW (367 PS; 362 hp); 326 kW (443 PS; 437 hp)
- Specific power: 46.6 kW (63.4 PS; 62.5 hp) per litre 51.7 kW (70.3 PS; 69.3 hp) per litre
- Torque output: 530 N⋅m (391 lb⋅ft); 620 N⋅m (457 lb⋅ft)

Chronology
- Predecessor: Mercedes-Benz M120
- Successor: Mercedes-Benz M275

The Mercedes-Benz M137 engine is a naturally aspirated, SOHC 60° V12 engine, with three valves per cylinder, 2 intake and 1 exhaust. It was built to replace the larger and heavier, yet more powerful, DOHC, four valves per cylinder, naturally aspirated, 6.0 L M120 V12 unit. The M137 was used briefly between 1998 and 2002 for the W220 S-Class (long wheelbase only) and C215 CL-Class. The architecture is similar to M112 and M113 engines, and is designed to match the overall dimensions of a V8 unit with undersquare internal measurements. The crankcase was cast in a lightweight alloy with "Silitec" (silicon/aluminium) cylinder liners to save weight. The M137 is 80 kg lighter than its predecessor and features cylinder deactivation technology. Both displacement variants have 10:1 compression ratio.

The M137 was replaced by the more powerful twin-turbocharged M275 engine.

== E58 ==
Mercedes introduced the M137.970 engine in its 5.8-litre form in S 600 and CL 600 models. The internal measurements of 84 by 87 mm (3.3 by 3.4 in) of bore and stroke translates to a total displacement of 5,786 cc (5.8 L; 353.1 cu in). The resulting power output is 270 kW (367 PS; 362 hp) at 5500 rpm and torque figures of 530 N⋅m (391 lb⋅ft) at 4250 rpm. From 1997 up to 2002, Mercedes produced 11,693 examples of the M137.970-powered S 600 and further 6,348 units of the coupé version, CL 600.

M137.970 applications:

- 1997–2002 S 600 (W220)
- 1998–2002 CL 600 (C215)

== E63 ==
In 2001 Mercedes and AMG introduced a series of special high-output models equipped with a larger-displacement M137.980 engine. Cars were available through AMG dealers only and sold to selected European and Asian customers. The 2001 S 63 AMG was produced in only 70 units. The 2001 CL 63 AMG exists in only 26 examples and the rarest of all is the 2002 G 63 AMG with only five units produced. The total displacement of 6,258 cc (6.3 L; 381.9 cu in) is thanks to internal measurements of 84.5 by 93 mm (3.3 by 3.7 in). The resulting power output is 326 kW (443 PS; 437 hp) at 5500 rpm and torque figures of 620 N⋅m (457 lb⋅ft) at 4400 rpm.

M137.980 applications:

- 2001–2002 S 63 AMG (W220)
- 2001–2002 CL 63 AMG (C215)
- 2002 G 63 AMG (W463)

== Reliability issues ==
The Mercedes M137 V12 engine, found in the 2000–2002 S600 and CL600 models, has a reputation for being one of the company's least reliable engines. It was notoriously short-lived due to several costly, major design flaws that can lead to catastrophic engine failure. Major known reliability issues Out-of-round cylinder walls: This is the most critical issue and can lead to excessive oil consumption. As the cylinder walls lose their shape, oil leaks past them and fouls the oxygen sensors and catalytic converters. Repairing this problem requires a new engine and can cost over $34,000 for parts alone. Failed ignition coil packs: When one coil pack fails, the entire bank must be replaced, resulting in an expensive repair. Oil fouling: The oil that leaks past the cylinder walls contaminates other engine components, including the eight downstream oxygen sensors ($1,600 to replace) and the catalytic converters ($8,000 to replace). PCV system problems: Known issues with the M137's Positive Crankcase Ventilation (PCV) system can cause oil to build up where the intake pipes and manifold meet, leading to leaks. Cylinder deactivation system failure: The M137's cylinder deactivation system was complex and had issues with its solenoid pack and oil pressure tubes. Expensive and complicated repairs: The overall complexity of the engine and its sensitive components means repairs are difficult and costly, even by Mercedes-Benz standards

== See also ==
- List of Mercedes-Benz engines
