= Crosswind stabilization =

Advanced driver-assistance system

Crosswind stabilization (CWS) is a relatively new advanced driver-assistance system in cars and trucks that was first featured in a 2009 Mercedes-Benz S-Class. CWS assists drivers in controlling a vehicle during strong wind conditions such as driving over a bridge or when overtaking a semi-truck. CWS uses yaw rate, lateral acceleration, steering angle, and velocity sensors to determine how much assistance to give the driver in a certain scenario whether it be at different speeds or while turning. Using different components throughout the vehicle like brakes, differentials, and suspension, CWS can implement the readings from force sensors to properly assist the driver in a given situation.

== Origination ==
Crosswind stabilization was first used by Mercedes-Benz in 2009 in their S class and then later implemented in their Sprinter and Metris vans. Before this technology existed, vans and trucks of similar size had a higher risk of crashing in strong wind conditions as the surface area on the side of the vans and trucks caused the wind to push on the side of the vehicle acting like a sail. This wind can be caused by winds on an open plain, crossing bridges, or a semi-truck or any big vehicle moving at a high speed passing by. This can lead to spinouts and crashes as the driver is forced to grip the wheel tighter which can lead to jerky steering.

== How it works ==
Crosswind stabilization works on the basic principle that an undesirable force (crosswind) is acted upon a force in the opposite direction of equal force. When an undesirable wind is picked up by the vehicle's sensors, the hardware in a car's Electronic Stability Program (ESP) can create an unbalanced torque distribution (uneven amount of force on each axle) at the driven wheels which will counteract the wind.

The uneven torque-distribution can be caused by these ways:

1. Unevenly braking one side of the car. Doing so would cause the car to turn in the direction of the wheels that are braking. This slight turn will counteract the wind causing the vehicle to move in a straight line.
2. Applying more power to one set of axles. Applying more power to a set of axles will cause the wheel to rotate at a higher rpm. This is also known as torque vectoring. A wheel with a higher rpm will travel more distance compared to a lower rpm wheel. For example, if a crosswind is coming from the left causing the car to veer right, applying more power to the right axles, will cause the car to rotate left just enough to balance out the wind.

Some advanced systems such as Mercedes' Active Body Control (ABC) suspension, can soften or harden the suspension to provide the same results.

In Volkswagen's CWS, they use steering correction rather than using the differential or brakes to control the vehicle. The force sensors in the vehicle tell the ESP system which direction the wind is coming from and the ESP system adjusts the steering accordingly. This leads to no energy wasted and less tire wear as the differential and brakes are not actively changing the forces coming from the drivetrain.

== Components ==
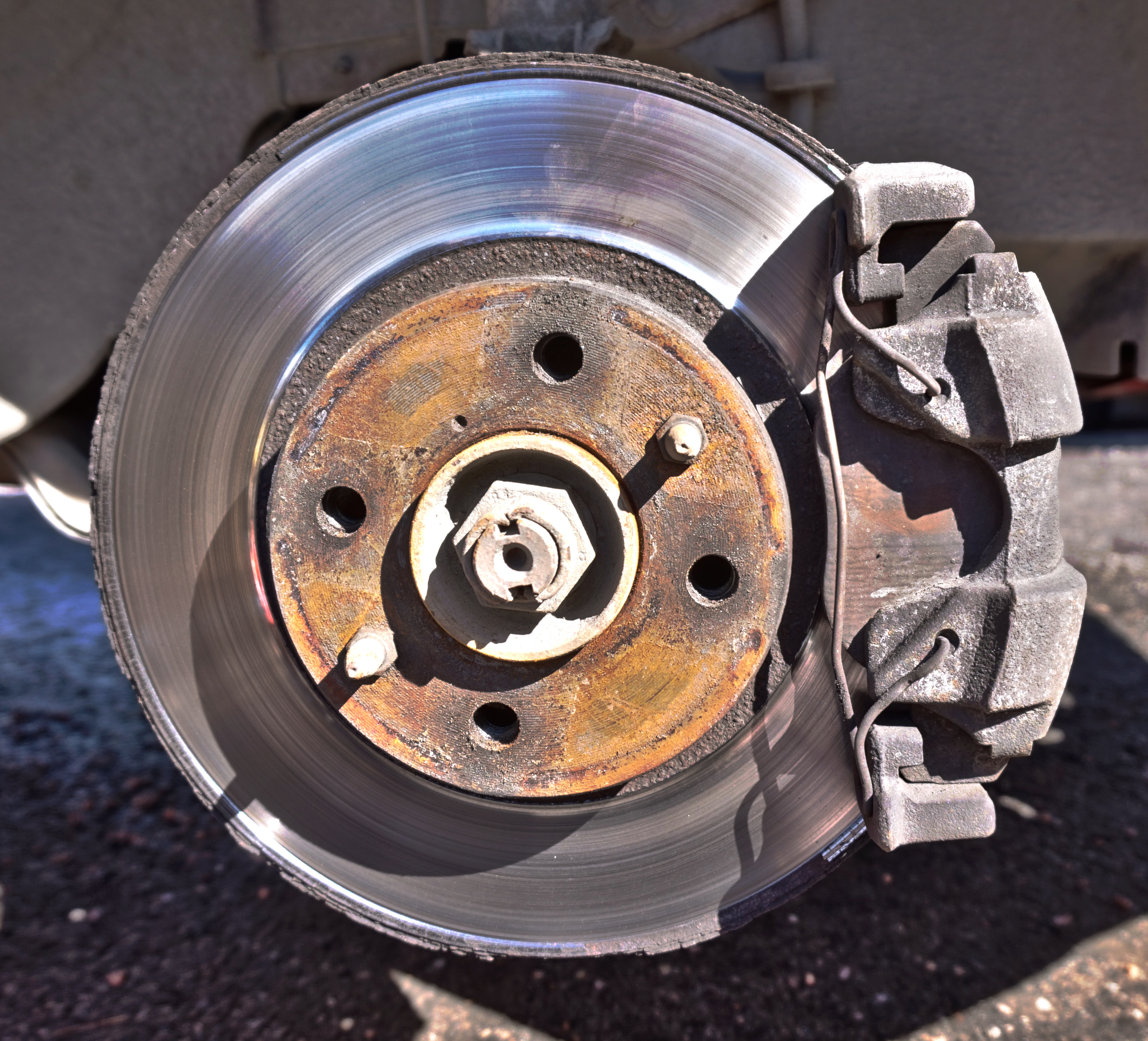
An example of what a disk brake looks like

=== Brakes ===
Brakes are used to stop a car. Brakes in some CWS cars are used to help steer the car in the opposite direction of where the wind is coming from. This is called torque vectoring by braking.

=== Differential ===
A differential in a car is constructed to drive a set of wheels and allows them to rotate at different speeds. If a car doesn't have a differential, this would make turning difficult and cause greater tire wear. In cars with CWS and ESP, the differential has many sensors and electronics to be able to control the differential using software. This allows for precise axle control which allows the car to be more stable.

=== ESP System ===
ESP, also known as Electronic Stability Program controls the vehicle's Antilock Braking System (ABS) and Traction Control System (TCS). The Traction control system works by applying less torque to a set of wheels to prevent burnouts or loss of grip from happening. The ABS system prevents the wheels from locking up while braking which can cause the car to skid in the straight line even if the driver wants to turn. Using these two systems, he ESP system uses a computer to determine when to use the ABS and TCS system to keep the car stable and not out of control. In cars with CWS, CWS uses the ESP system in order to control the car and without ESP, it wouldn't work.

=== Suspension ===
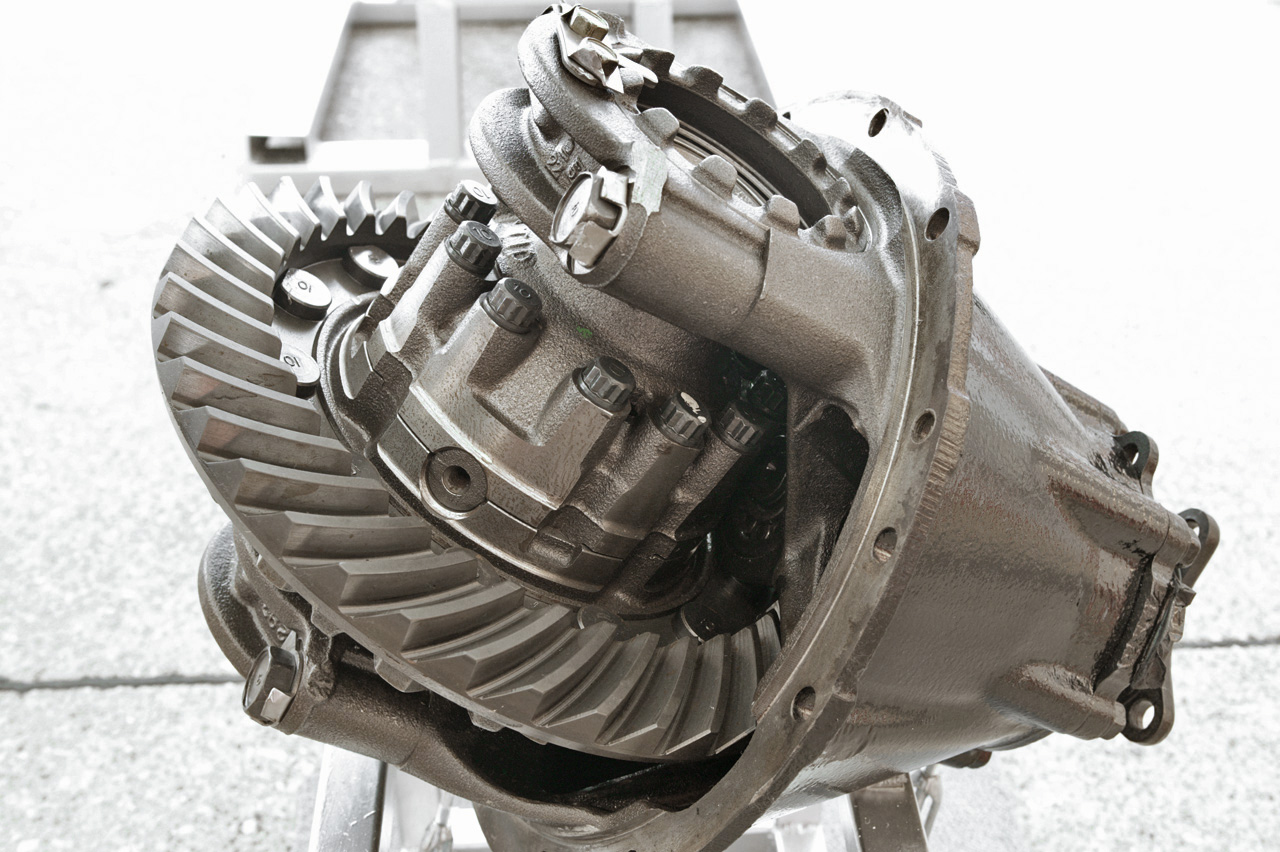
A differential

Suspension in the car is mainly used for keeping the car ride smooth while also providing more grip to the wheels while cornering. A softer suspension can cause sway which could lead to less responsive steering and oversteer. However, a softer suspension tends to lead to a smoother more comfortable ride. Stiff suspension minimizes body movement and leads to the wheels having more traction. However, a stiffer suspension can lead to a more unpleasant ride. Relating to CWS, some cars can stiffen or soften the suspension to get more grip on a certain set of tires which leads to a better-controlled car in high wind situations.

=== Electric Power Steering ===
Electric power steering (EPS) uses sensors and an electric motor to assist the steering effort. The wheel is connected to a steering wheel position sensor which tells the computer the position of the steering wheel and commands the electric motor accordingly. Using software, EPS allows cars to become self drivable. In CWS, some vehicle's software can control the steering of the vehicle to prevent spin outs or dangerous side-to-side movement to occur.

=== Force Sensors ===
Force sensors are used to determine the force of the wind acting on the side of the car. These readings are reported to the CWS system which then adjusts different components like the ones mentioned above to keep the vehicle stable.

== Vehicles that have CWS ==
Vehicles	Ford Transit	Mercedes Sprinter	Volkswagen Crafter	Mercedes Metris	Mercedes GL-Class	Mercedes S-Class
Image	2016 Ford Transit 350 2.2	2019 Mercedes-Benz Sprinter 314 CDi 2.1	2016 Volkswagen Crafter	Mercedes Metris	2016 Mercedes-Benz GLS 350d (X 166) 4MATIC wagon	2019 Mercedes-Benz S-class
MSRP($)	$34,510	$36,355	Unknown—Not available in U.S.	$27,180	$65,500	$94,250

== Effectiveness ==
A study by the University of Iowa using the National Advanced Driving Simulator ran a test called the "Wind Gust Scenario". In this scenario, 120 drivers were divided evenly between a bigger SUV and a sedan. Of each vehicle, drivers drove with ESC off or ESC on. The test required drivers to drive in their lane and a crosswind would push the drivers into the oncoming lane. According to the results, in vehicles with the crosswind stabilization enabled, only one driver lost control, while in vehicles without it, 50 of the 179 drivers lost control. This proves that, in strong crosswind situations, having ESP and CWS can prevent up to 30% more crashes.
