= Mercedes-Benz M275 engine =

Mercedes-Benz M275/M285
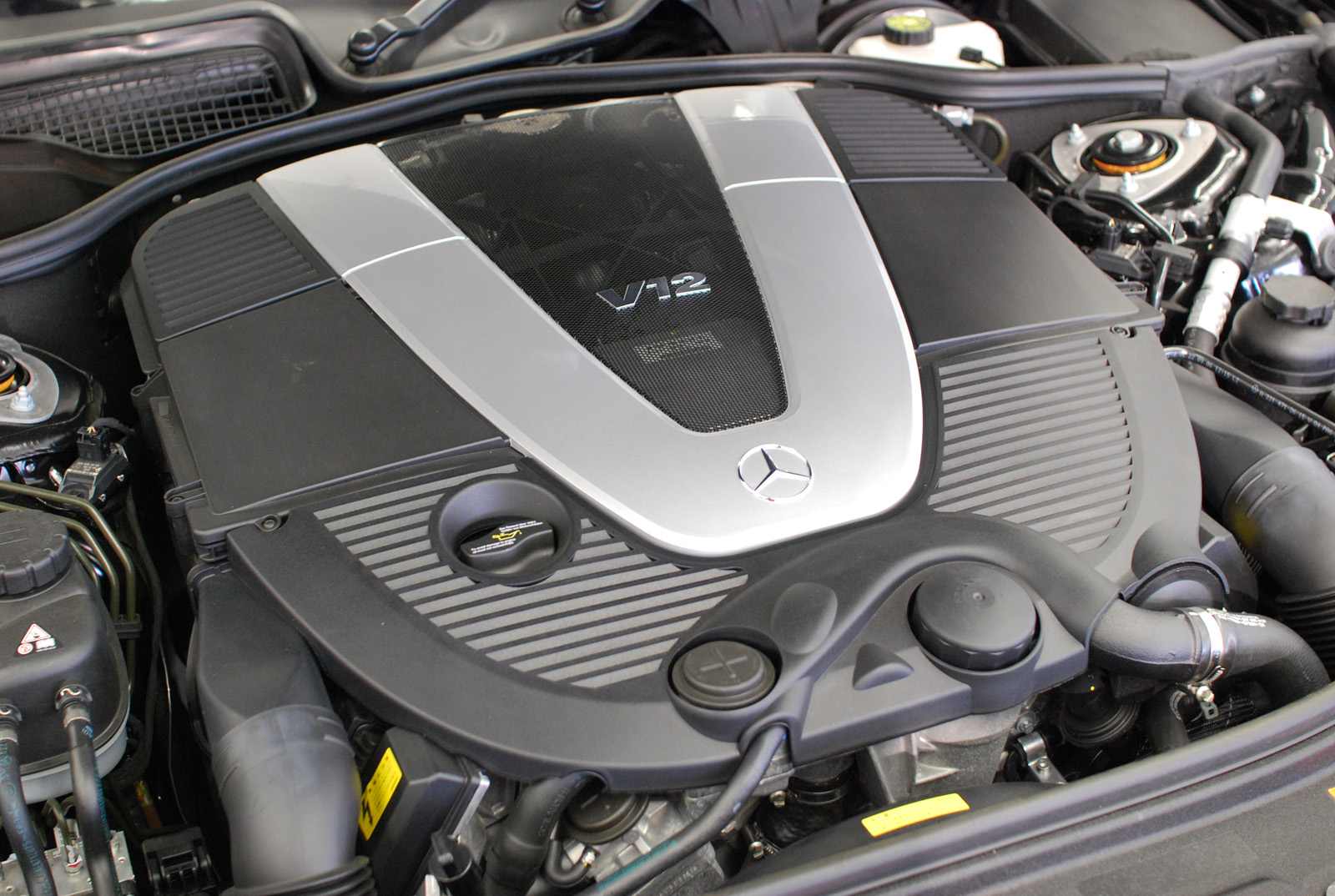

Overview
- Manufacturer: Mercedes-Benz
- Production: 2002–2015

Layout
- Configuration: 60° V12
- Displacement: 5.5 L (5,513 cc); 6.0 L (5,980 cc)
- Cylinder bore: 82 mm (3.23 in); 82.6 mm (3.25 in)
- Piston stroke: 87 mm (3.43 in); 93 mm (3.66 in)
- Cylinder block material: Aluminium
- Cylinder head material: Aluminium
- Valvetrain: SOHC 3 valves per cyl.

Combustion
- Turbocharger: Twin-turbo and intercooled
- Fuel system: Fuel injection
- Management: Bosch
- Oil system: Wet sump
- Cooling system: Water-cooled

Output
- Power output: 517–838 PS (380–616 kW; 510–827 hp)
- Torque output: 830–1,100 N⋅m (612–811 lb⋅ft)

Chronology
- Predecessor: Mercedes-Benz M137
- Successor: Mercedes-Benz M279

The Mercedes-Benz M275 (and similar M285) engine is a twin-turbocharged and intercooled, all-aluminium, 60° V12 automobile piston engine family used in the 2000s to the 2010s. It is loosely based on the M137 naturally aspirated V12 sold between 1998 and 2002, and retains its SOHC, 3 valves per cylinder, twin-spark ignition layout, but differs with the addition of structural reinforcements to the engine block for improved rigidity which in turn yields greater reliability. The M275 V12 Bi-Turbo engine was modified with the addition of larger turbochargers. Several variations of the M275 V12 Bi-turbo engine have powered many top-of-the-range Mercedes-Benz and Maybach models since 2003.

== M275 ==
Bore and stroke is 82 mm × 87 mm (3.23 in × 3.43 in) giving a displacement of 5,513 cc (5.5 L). Power output ranges from 368 kW (500 PS; 493 hp) to 380 kW (517 PS; 510 hp) at 5000 rpm and 800 N⋅m (590 lb⋅ft) to 830 N⋅m (612 lb⋅ft) of torque at 1800–3500 rpm.

Applications:

- 2002–2005 S 600 (W220)
- 2005–2013 S 600 (W221)
- 2003–2005 CL 600 (C215)
- 2006–2014 CL 600 (C216)
- 2003–2011 SL 600 (R230)

== M275 AMG ==
The first V12 from AMG was dubbed M275 AMG - a 6.0 L (5,980 cc) version, with boost pressure reaching 22.1 psi (1.52 bar) at maximum, and uses air-to-liquid intercoolers. Bore and stroke are increased to 82.6 mm × 93 mm (3.25 in × 3.66 in). Output is 450 kW (612 PS; 603 hp) or later 463 kW (630 PS; 621 hp) at 4800–5100 rpm with 1,000 N⋅m (738 lb⋅ft) of torque at 2000–4000 rpm. It uses an ECI ignition system for the two spark plugs per cylinder, which helps with combustion and to support Ionic current measurement function sequence. The top of the range variant fitted in the SL 65 AMG Black Series, which is equipped with 12% larger turbochargers, generates 670 metric horsepower (493 kW; 661 hp) at 4800–5400 rpm and 1,200 newton-metres (885 lb⋅ft) of torque at 2200–4200 rpm. However, due to the torque abundance to power the rear wheels, the SL65 Black is still limited to 1,000 newton-metres (738 lb⋅ft).

Applications:

- 2003–2005 S 65 AMG (V220)
- 2005–2013 S 65 AMG (V221)
- 2003–2005 CL 65 AMG (C215)
- 2007–2013 CL 65 AMG (C216)
- 2004–2010 SL 65 AMG (R230)
- 2008–2009 SL 65 AMG Black Series (R230)
- 2012–2018 G 65 AMG (W463)
- 2017–2018 Maybach G 650 Landaulet (W463)
- 2005 Laraki Fulgura V12
- 2006 Fisker Tramonto V12
- 2007 Stola Phalcon (6.3-litre conversion by Brabus)

== M285/M285 AMG ==
The M285 and its AMG version of this 5.5 L (5,513 cc) engine built in Stuttgart, Germany specifically for Maybach badged products. Bore and stroke is 82 mm × 87 mm (3.23 in × 3.43 in). Output is 405 kilowatts (551 PS; 543 hp) at 5250 rpm with 900 newton-metres (664 lb⋅ft) of torque at 2300–3000 rpm. The cylinders are lined with silicon/aluminium, and uses fracture-split forged steel connecting rods. The Maybach 57S and 62S received engines displacing 6.0 L (5,980 cc) and outputting 450 kilowatts (612 PS; 603 hp) at 4800–5100 rpm. Facelifted versions had 463 kilowatts (630 PS; 621 hp). For the Zeppelin variant, power output rose to 471 kW (640 PS; 632 hp) at 5250 rpm with 1000 N·m (738 lb·ft) of torque.

Spanish sports car manufacturer Tramontana uses a 5.5-liter, twin-turbocharged M285 AMG engine in its cars. On the top model, the Tramontana XTR, it produces 653 kW (888 PS; 881 hp) and 1,100 N·m (809 lb·ft). The Tramontana C, S and R also feature this V12 in a lower output trim, with outputs ranging from 550–720 horsepower (410–537 kW).

Applications:

M285.950:

- 2002–2012 Maybach 57 and 62

M285.980:

- 2004 Maybach Exelero
- 2005–2012 Maybach 57S and 62S
- 2009–2012 Maybach 57 and 62 "Zeppelin"
- 2011 Maybach 57S Cruisero Coupé by Xenatec

M285 AMG:

- 2005 Tramontana
- 2009 Tramontana R
- 2013 Tramontana XTR
- 2015 Tramontana S

== M158 ==
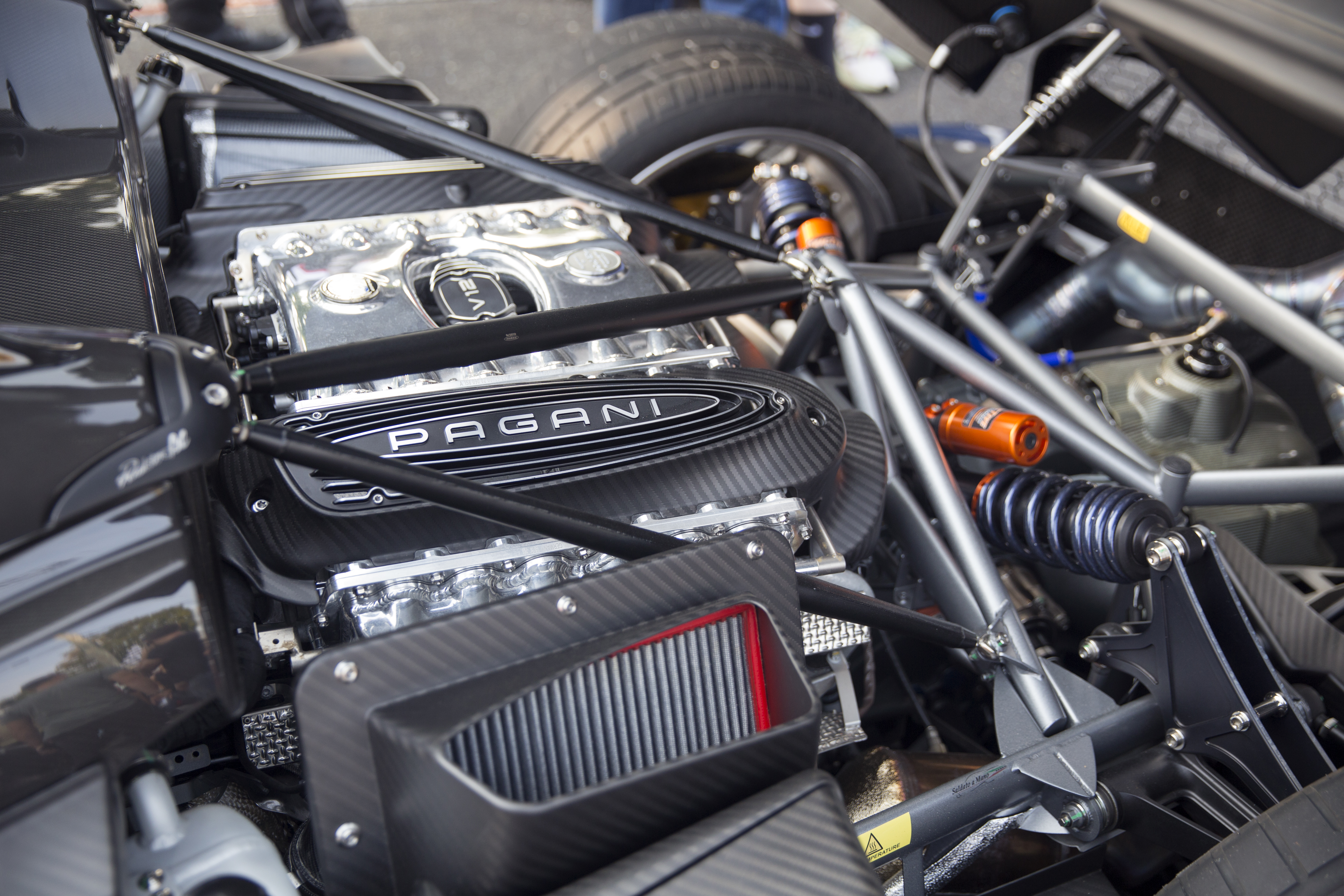
M158 engine in a Pagani Huayra

The M158 is a 6.0 L (5,980 cc) version based on the M275 AMG. The engine uses smaller twin scroll type turbos (for reduced turbo-lag), a bespoke Bosch ECU, a modified intercooler configuration, and dry sump lubrication. It produces 730 metric horsepower (537 kW; 720 hp) at 5800 rpm and 1,000 newton-metres (738 lb⋅ft) of torque at 2250–4500 rpm. AMG builds this engine specifically for Pagani Automobili for use in the Huayra. Later, in the BC model, the M158 makes 764 metric horsepower (562 kW; 754 hp) and 1,100 newton-metres (811 lb⋅ft). The Imola variant of the Huayra uses a version of the M158 producing 838 metric horsepower (616 kW; 827 hp) and 1,100 newton-metres (811 lb⋅ft). The engine is mated to a new 7-speed electrohydraulic automated manual gearbox designed and built by XTrac.

Applications:

- 2012–present Pagani Huayra
- 2023–present Pagani Utopia

== See also ==
- List of Mercedes-Benz engines
