= Maybach Exelero =

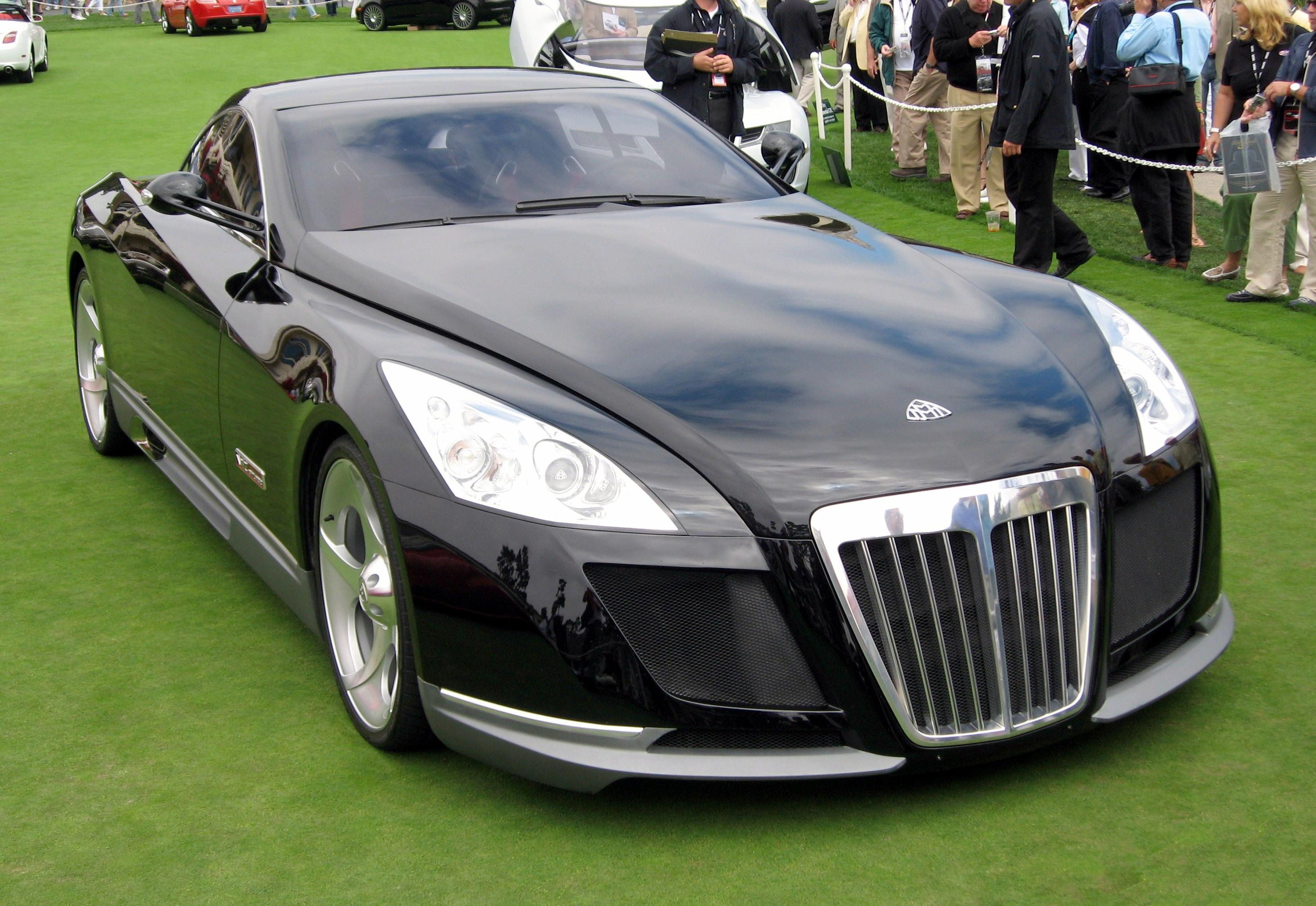

Overview
- Manufacturer: Stola; DaimlerChrysler
- Production: 2004; One-off concept
- Designer: Fredrik Burchhardt

Body and chassis
- Class: Sports car (S)
- Body style: 2-door coupé
- Layout: FR layout
- Related: Maybach 57

Powertrain
- Engine: 6.0 L 5,980 cc (365 cu in) M285 twin-turbo V12

Dimensions
- Wheelbase: 3,390.1 mm (133.47 in)
- Length: 5,834.4 mm (229.7 in)
- Width: 2,120.9 mm (83.5 in)
- Height: 1,376.7 mm (54.2 in)
- Curb weight: 2,730 kg (6,019 lb)

The Maybach Exelero is a one-off high-performance sports car made by Stola (now part of Blutec) in collaboration with DaimlerChrysler. It was unveiled at the Tempodrom in Berlin in 2005.

== Development ==
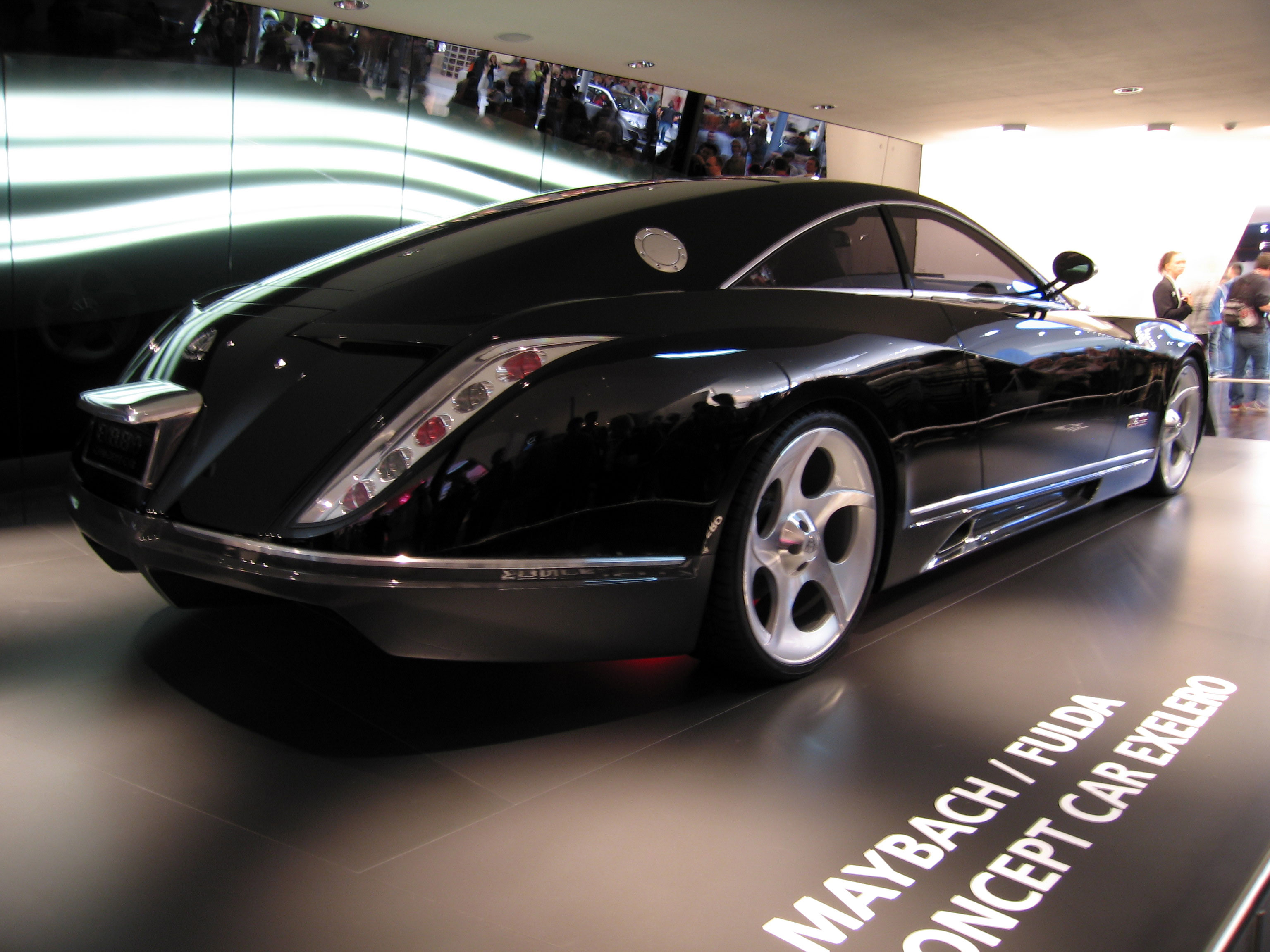
Rear of the Exelero.

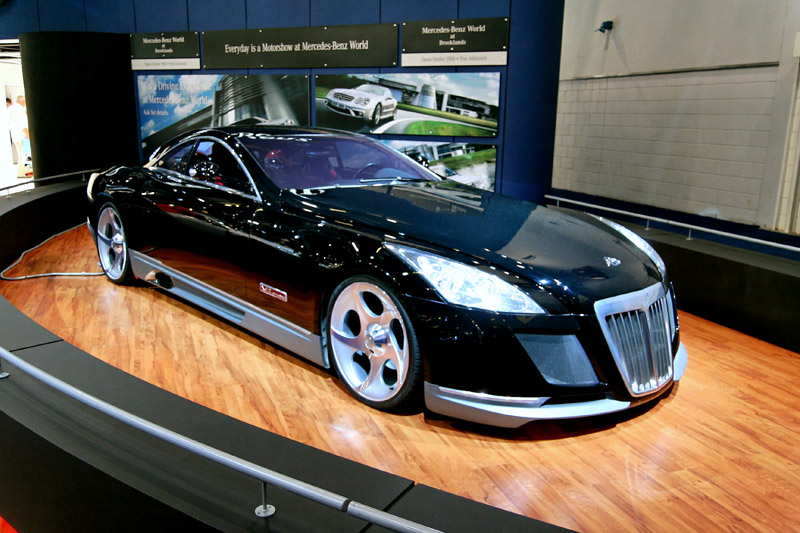
Maybach Exelero

The Exelero was commissioned by Fulda, a German subsidiary of Goodyear, to test their new Carat Exelero tyre range. The Exelero was the second vehicle to serve as a one-off show car for Fulda's high performance tyre range, the first being the Gemballa Extremo in 1996. In collaboration with Maybach, the initial design of the Exelero was to be influenced by the 1938 Maybach SW 38 and built on the platform of the Maybach 57. Another important design stipulation from Fulda was that the car should be able to reach speeds in excess of 350 km/h (220 mph) so that the physical limits of the Exelero tyres could be tested. The final design of the Exelero was produced by four students from the Transportation Design School of Pforzheim University of Applied Sciences. In 2007, Stola introduced the Phalcon, a two-door coupe inspired by the Exelero.

== Specifications ==
=== Powertrain ===
The Exelero is powered by a twin turbo V12 engine made by the defunct Maybach (now a part of the Mercedes-Benz division of Daimler AG), and mounted at 60º. Each cylinder has three valves, and a compression ratio of 9.2:1. The engine produces 515 kW (700 PS; 690 hp) at 5,000 rpm and 1,020 N⋅m (752 ft⋅lb) of torque at 2,500 rpm. It is mated to a 5G-Tronic automatic transmission.

The Exelero has a theoretical top speed of 351 km/h (218 mph) and a 0–100 km/h (0–62 mph) acceleration time of 4.4 seconds.

=== Wheels ===
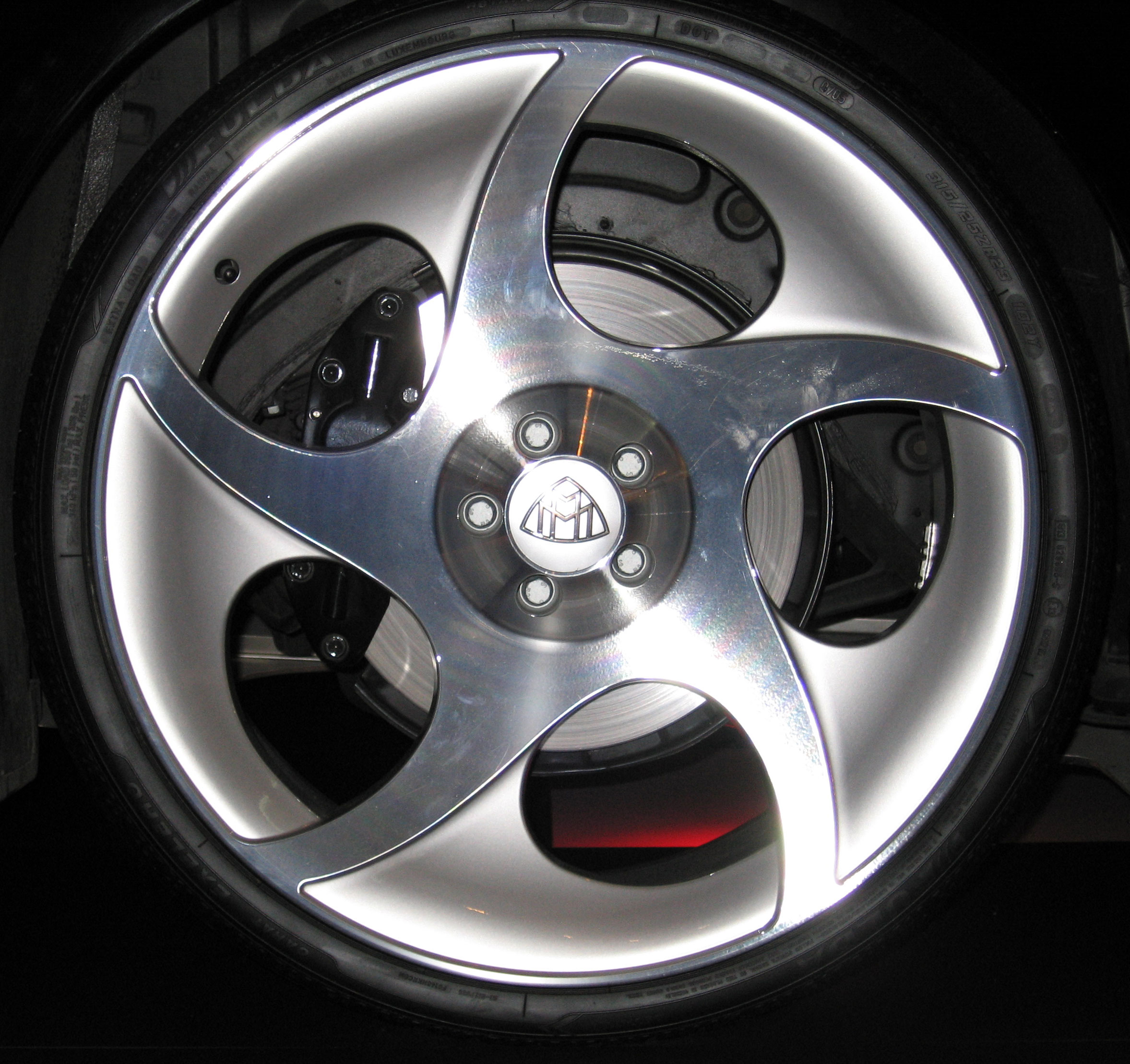
Maybach Exelero's Wheel(s)

The Exelero has alloy wheels with diameters of 23 inches (584 mm) at the front and the rear. The Fulda Carat Exelero tyres with a size of 315/25 ZR 23 for both the front and rear. The brakes are vented discs at the front and rear, and are equipped with ABS.

=== Interior ===
The main materials used in the construction of the Exelero's interior are dark and red leather, neoprene, glossy black carbon fibre, and aluminium accents. The Exelero has sport seats with red harness-style seatbelts.

=== Exterior ===
The Exelero's exterior is black with a long hood, chrome grille and fuel cap.

== In popular culture ==
The car is noted for being portrayed in an episode of long-running German show Cobra 11, in which it is used in the ending chase of the Staffel 10 Episode 16 - Freundschaft (151).

According to Top Gear, the vehicle was purchased by rapper Birdman in 2011 for US$8 million. In January 2012, Motorvison profiled the car, which was then owned by Mechatronik and located in Germany, and reports previous rumors of sale to be unfounded.

Jay-Z featured the car in the music video for "Lost One".

The car is shown in the Japanese anime Nisekoi on its first season's 11th episode as a birthday gift to Chitoge Kirisaki, the daughter of the Beehive Gang boss, by Claude, the guardian of Chitoge.

The car is now in an automobile museum in Dietzhölztal Germany as part of the Friedhelm Loh collection.

== See also ==
- Mercedes-Maybach 6
