= Alfa Romeo Nuvola =

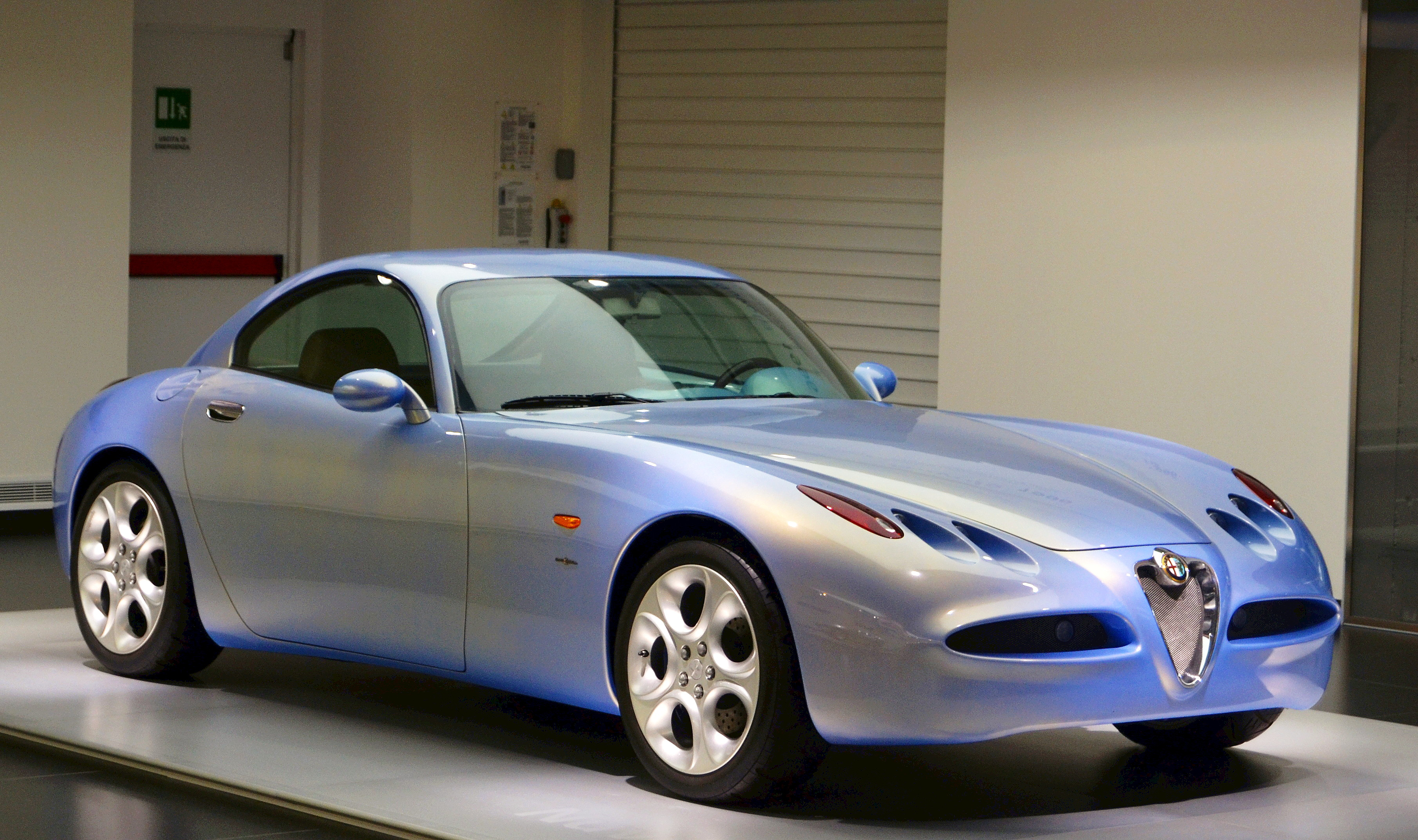
- Nuvola at the Alfa Romeo Museum in Milan

Overview
- Manufacturer: Alfa Romeo; Stola
- Production: 1996
- Designer: Centro Stile Alfa Romeo under Walter de Silva

Body and chassis
- Class: Concept car
- Body style: 2-door coupé
- Layout: Front-engine, four-wheel-drive

Powertrain
- Engine: 2.5L Alfa Romeo twin-turbo V6 (petrol)
- Transmission: 6-speed manual

Dimensions
- Wheelbase: 2,600 mm (100 in)
- Length: 4,286 mm (168.7 in)
- Width: 1,859 mm (73.2 in)

The Alfa Romeo Nuvola is a concept car with coupé body first shown by Alfa Romeo at the Mondial de l'Automobile Paris motor show in 1996. Nuvola literally means "cloud" in Italian, but also hints to the legendary Italian racing driver Tazio Nuvolari. The Nuvola has a front-mounted engine and four wheel drive. The prototype is currently on display at the Alfa Romeo Historical Museum in Arese, Italy.

== Concept and design ==
This concept car was intended both as a future design manifesto and a technology demonstrator, the idea behind it being the rebirth of the coach built automobile: Alfa Romeo would have supplied rolling chassis to be bodied by independent coachbuilders, and possibly sold through Alfa Romeo dealers. To achieve this stylistic flexibility the car was based on a modern space frame chassis with a separate body; it was designed to handle virtually any body style, from coupé to roadster to shooting brake.

The Nuvola was penned by a group of young designers from Centro Stile Alfa Romeo, at the time headed by Walter de Silva. It featured LED lighting and bumpers fully integrated in the shape of the bodywork.

== Specifications ==
The Nuvola is a 2-door, 2-seat coupé with a polyester body coupled to a welded tubular steel space frame. It is powered by a longitudinal 2.5 litre (2492 cc), twin-turbo, 60-degree Alfa Romeo V6 engine coupled to a 6-speed manual transmission and four-wheel drive. The engine puts out 300 PS (221 kW; 296 hp) at 6000 rpm and 285 lb⋅ft (386 N⋅m) at 3000 rpm, making the Nuvola capable of a top speed of 174 mph (280 km/h) and 0 to 60 mph (97 km/h) acceleration in 6 seconds.

== Gallery ==
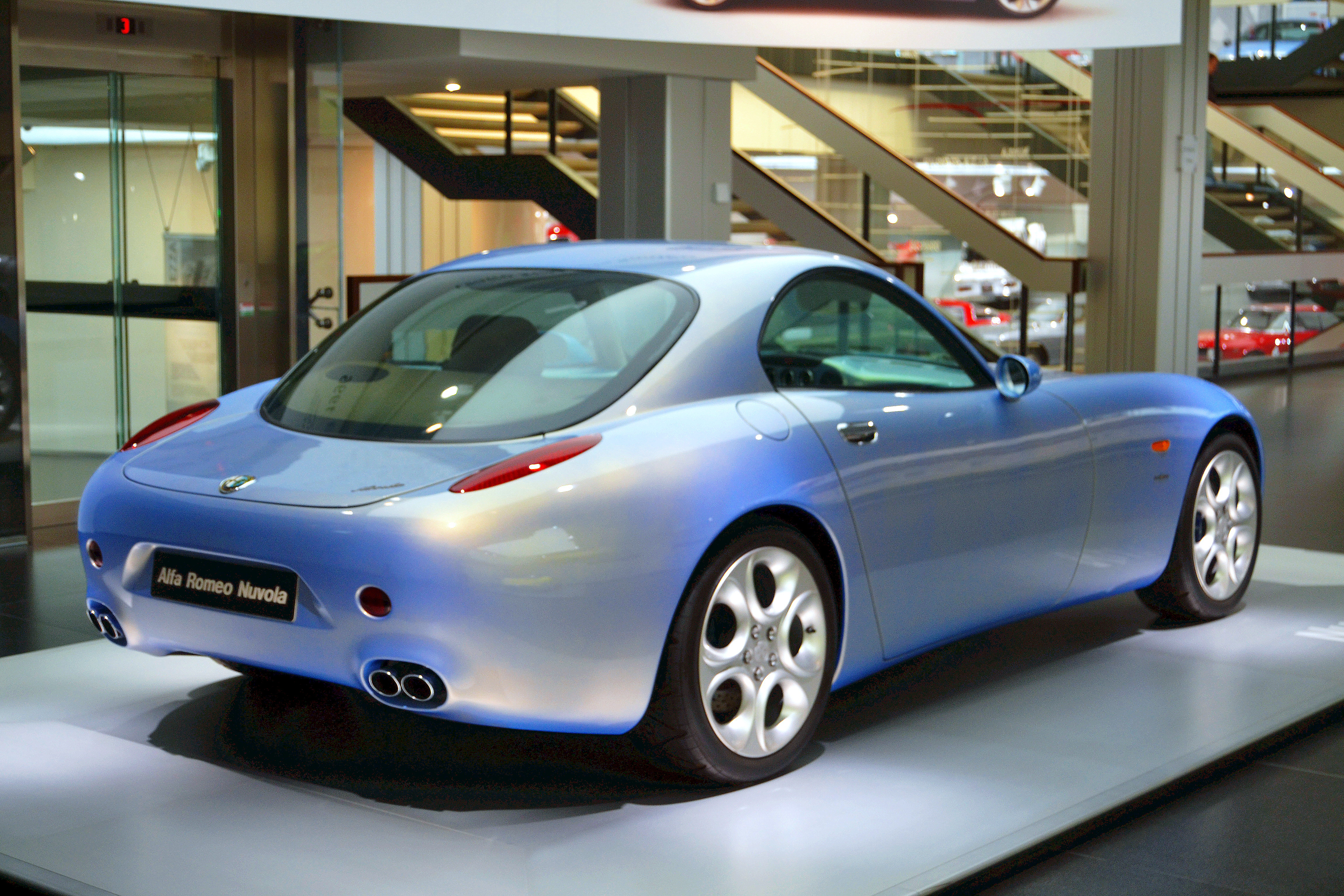
Rear view

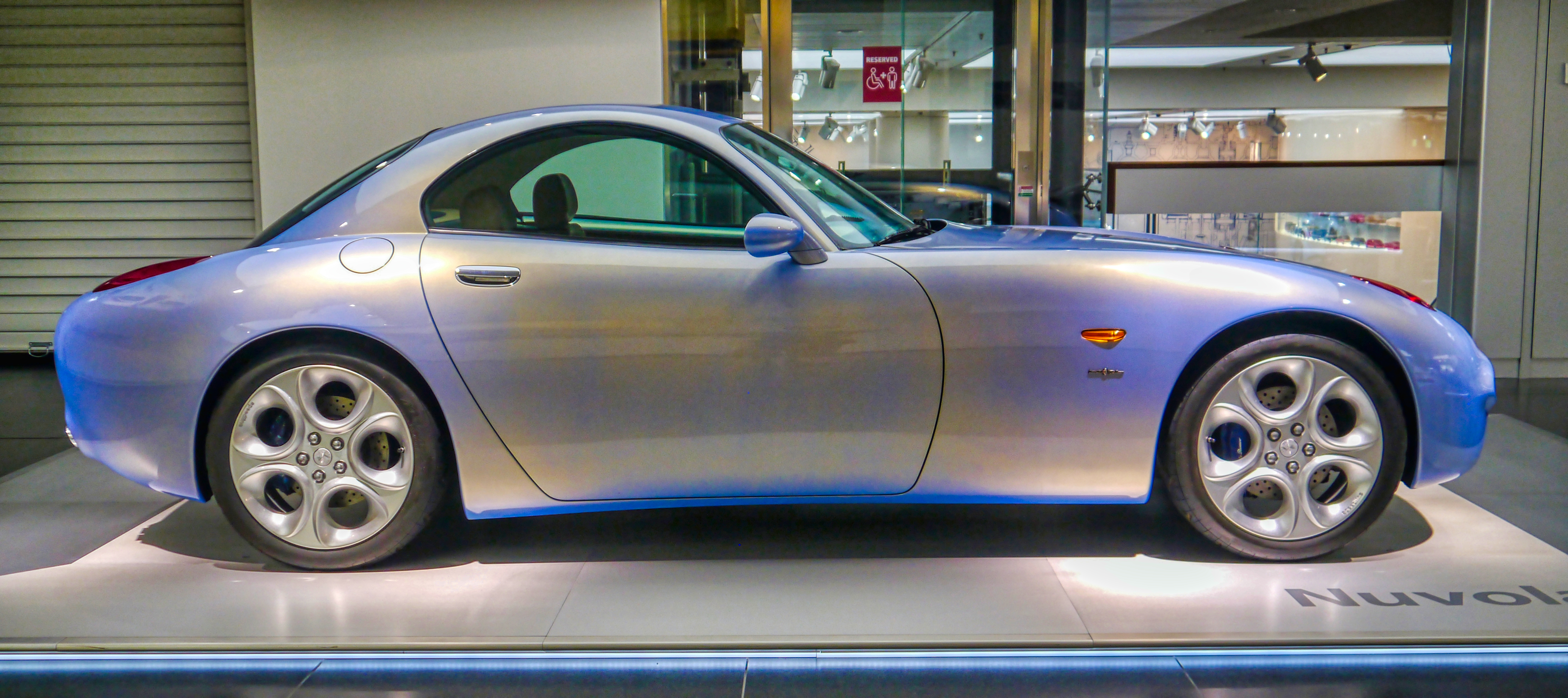
Side view

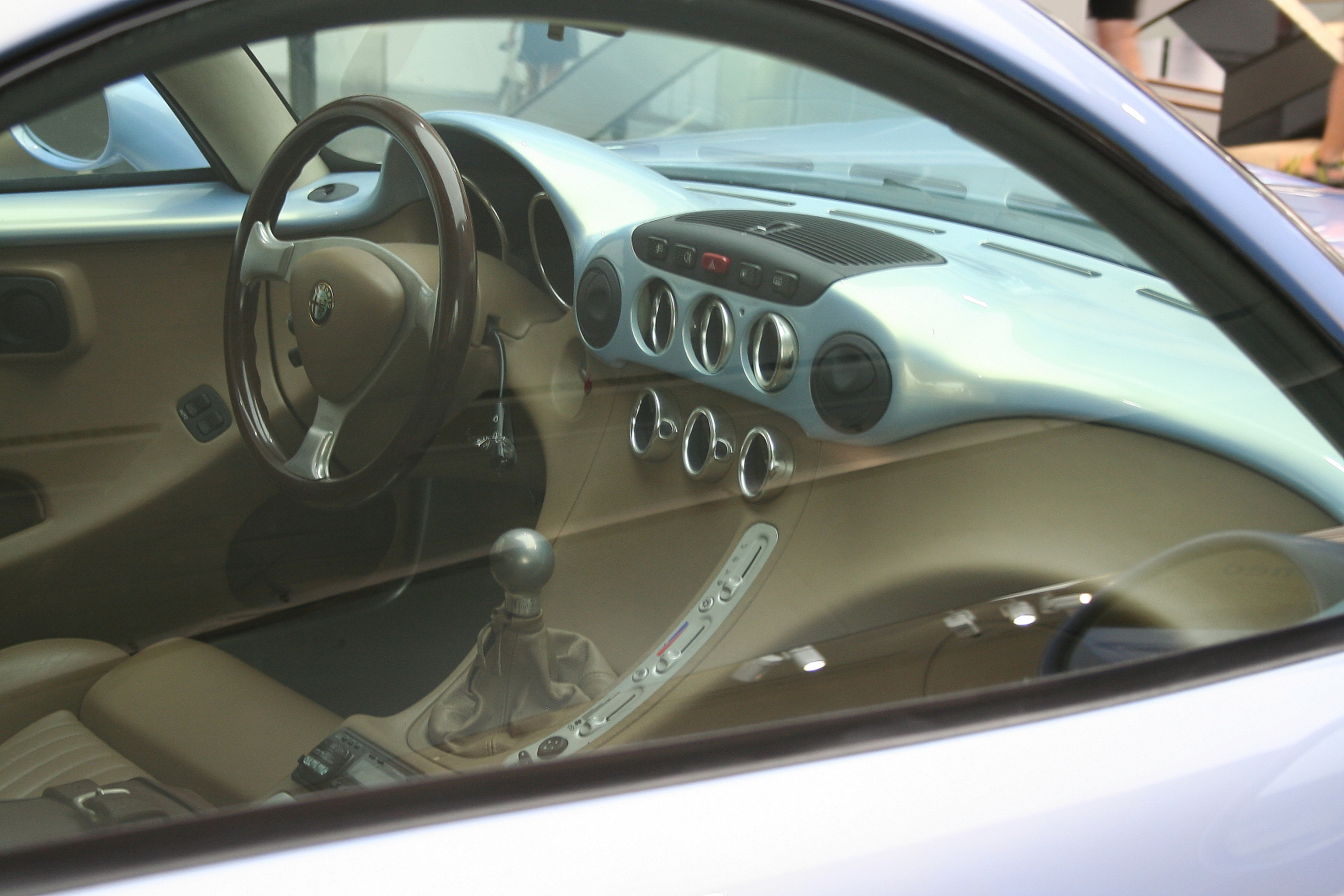
Interior
