= Alfa Romeo Kamal =

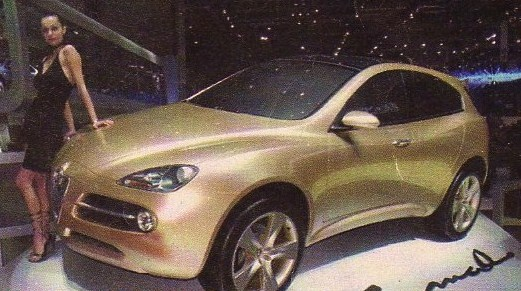

Overview
- Manufacturer: Alfa Romeo; Stola
- Production: 2003
- Designer: Alessandro Dambrosio under Wolfgang Egger at Centro Stile Alfa Romeo

Body and chassis
- Class: Concept car
- Body style: 4/5-door SUV
- Related: Alfa Romeo 147

The Alfa Romeo Kamal is a crossover SUV (sports utility vehicle) concept car designed by the Italian car manufacturer Alfa Romeo, under the project code 921. The Kamal was presented at the 2003 Geneva Motor Show. The vehicle used the Alfa Romeo 147 platform, and was initially set for launch in 2007. The brand was also intended to have returned to the United States in 2007.

During the development stages, Alfa Romeo used the project name CXover. Kamal means 'lotus' in Sanskrit. The term means 'perfection' or the 'synthesis of opposites' in Arabic. Alfa Romeo eventually launched a new production crossover SUV, the Alfa Romeo Stelvio, in late 2016, with sales commencing the following year.

Exterior design of the see-through model was developed by Alessandro Dambrosio and Tori Odagiri of Centro Stile Alfa Romeo under the supervision of Wolfgang Egger. The model itself was constructed by Stola between 2002 and 2003.
