= Gorden Wagener =

German car designer (1963)

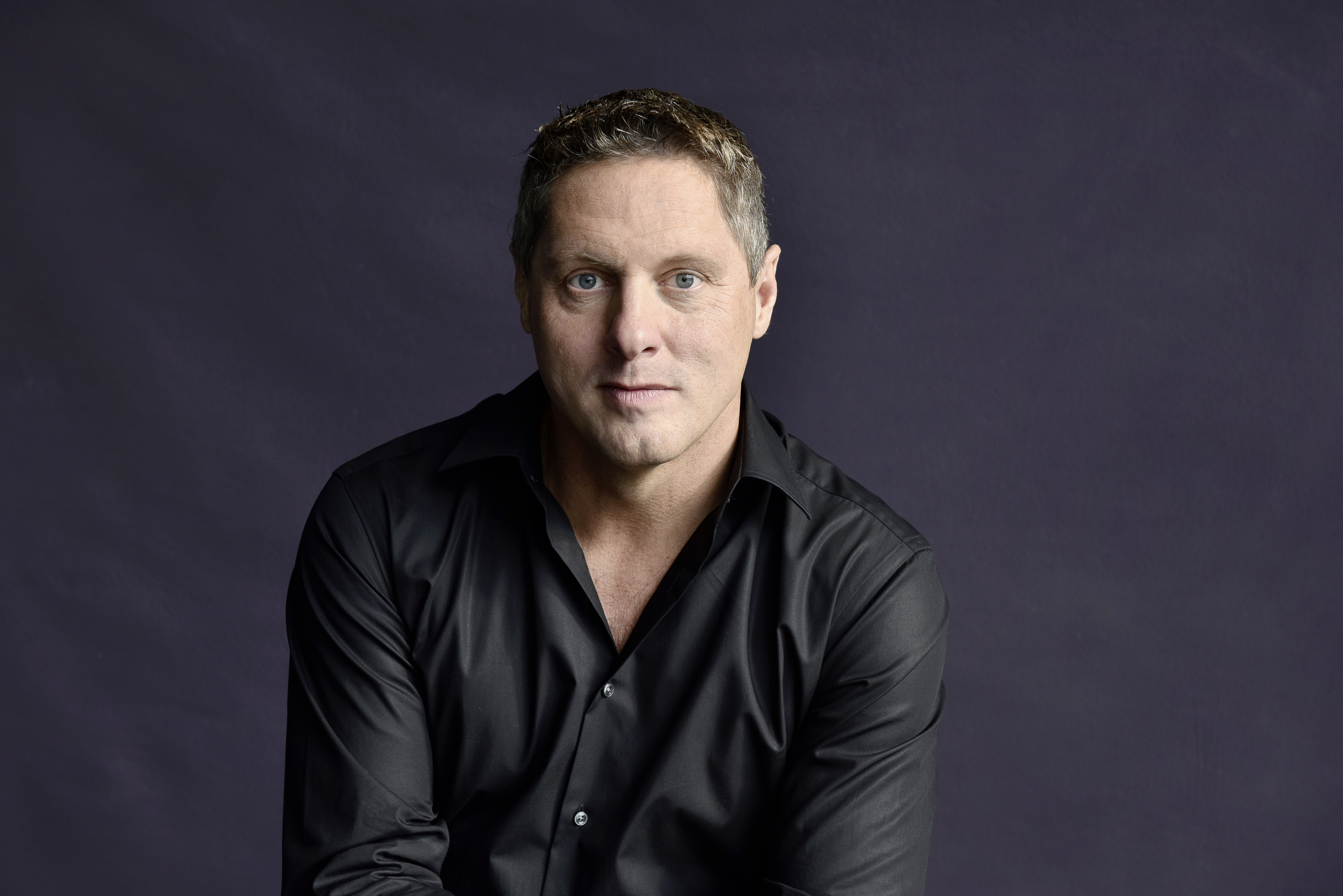
- Gorden Wagener, Chief Design Officer Daimler AG
- Born: 3 September 1968 (age 57); Essen, West Germany
- Occupation: Car designer
- Notable work: Mercedes-Benz S-Class; Mercedes-Benz SLR McLaren

Gorden Wagener (born 3 September 1968) is a German car designer, and is the chief design officer for Mercedes-Benz Group AG. He was born in Essen.

== Career ==
Wagener studied Industrial Design at the University of Duisburg-Essen (1990–1993), after which he specialized his studies in Transportation Design at The Royal College of Art in London. After college, he worked as an exterior designer for Volkswagen, Mazda and General Motors.

In 1997 he joined Mercedes-Benz as a transportation designer and became the manager for the exterior and interior styling of the R-Class, ML-Class and GL-Class models in 1999 and moving onto the A-Class, B-Class, C-Class, E-Class, CLK-Class and CLS-Class in 2002. He moved to the Advanced Design studio in the US in 2006 and became Director of Design Strategy and Global Advanced Design in 2007. The following year he was promoted to Vice President Design of Daimler AG where he developed the company style called "sensual purity" in 2009.

Wagener was appointed Daimler's Chief Design Officer in 2016, becoming a board member of the company.

Wagener was awarded the honorary title of Professor Honoris Causa from the Moholy-Nagy University of Art and Design in Budapest in 2009 and in 2010 he was awarded an honorary doctorate from the Technical University of Sofia.

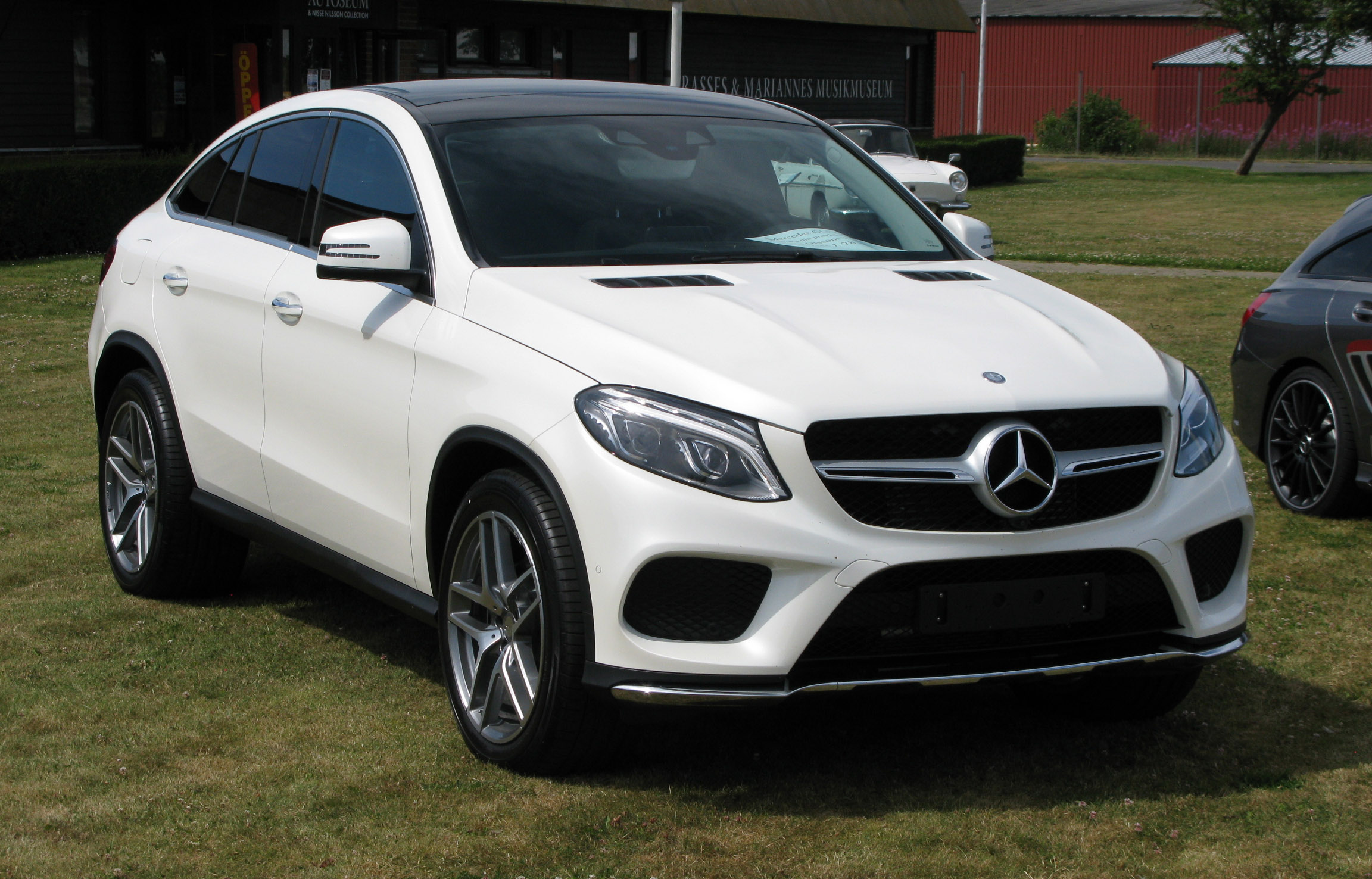
Mercedes-Benz GLE Coupé

Wagener was awarded The American Prize for Design in 2017 in conjunction with Good Design by the Chicago Athenaeum and the European Centre for Architecture Art Design and Urban Studies.

=== Notable designs ===
- Mercedes-Benz A-Class
- Mercedes-Benz S-Class (W221)
- Mercedes-Benz GLE-Class
- Mercedes-Benz CLK-Class
- Mercedes-Benz GLC-Class
- Mercedes-EQ
- Mercedes-Benz VLE
- Mercedes-Benz SLR McLaren
- Mercedes-AMG ONE
- Vision Mercedes-Maybach 6
- Mercedes-Benz F015 concept
