= Mercedes-Benz Vision SLA =

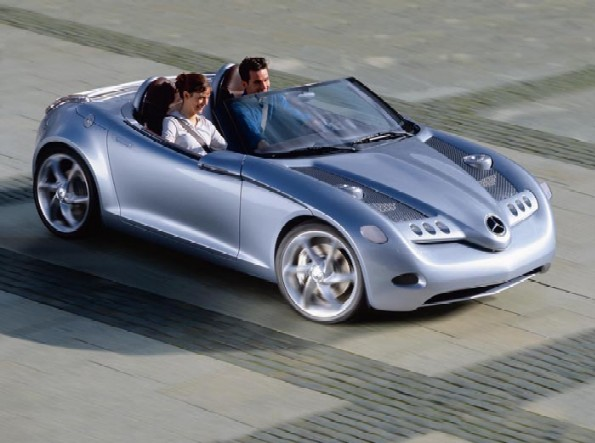

Overview
- Manufacturer: DaimlerChrysler; Stola
- Production: 1999 (Concept car)

Body and chassis
- Class: Sports Car/Concept Car
- Body style: 2-door convertible
- Layout: FF
- Related: Mercedes-Benz A-Class; Mercedes-Benz SLK-Class

Powertrain
- Engine: 1.9 L M166 E19 SOHC 8-valve I4
- Transmission: 5-speed Manual

Dimensions
- Length: 3.77 m (148.4 in)

The Mercedes-Benz Vision SLA was a concept car that was shown at the Detroit International Auto Show in January 2000. The two-seater convertible concept car was based on the Mercedes-Benz A-Class, and was only 3.77 m (148.4 in) long. Concept car was constructed by Stola in late 1999.

The body was constructed with aluminum and plastic to keep the weight down, and its distinctive pointed front design became a feature of then upcoming 2004 Mercedes-Benz SLK-Class (R171). The SLA's engine was a 4-cylinder 1.9 L from the A-Class, producing 92 kW (125 PS; 123 bhp).
