= Mercedes-Maybach 6 =

Vision Mercedes-Maybach 6
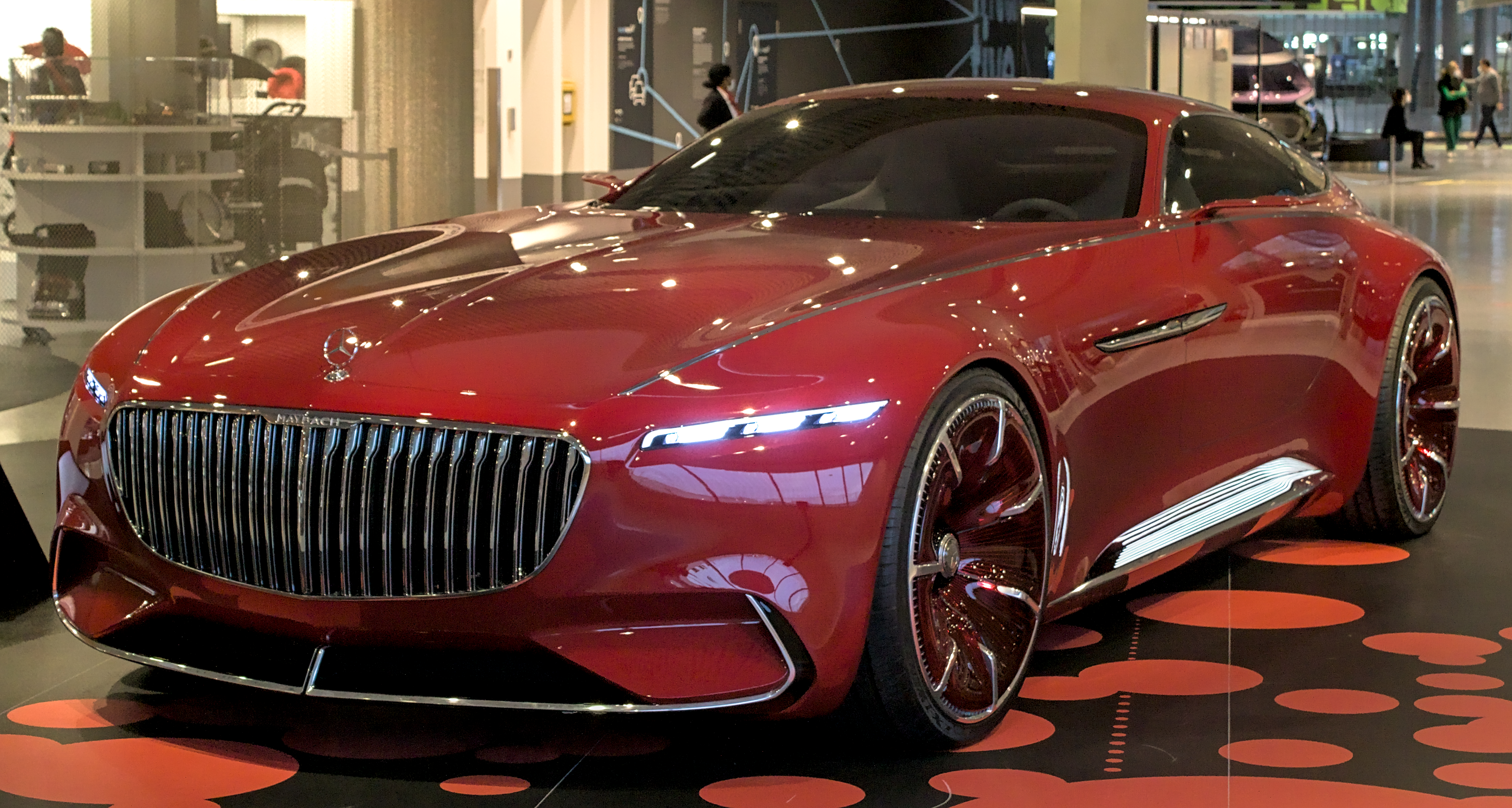

Overview
- Manufacturer: Daimler AG
- Production: 2016, 2017 (concept car)
- Designer: Gorden Wagener

Body and chassis
- Class: Concept grand tourer (S)
- Body style: 2-door coupé 2-door cabriolet
- Layout: Front-engine, all-wheel-drive
- Doors: Gull-wing doors (coupé); Conventional doors (cabriolet)

Powertrain
- Electric motor: 4 electric motors (738 hp (550 kW) combined)
- Battery: 90 kWh lithium-ion battery
- Electric range: 227 mi (366 km) (EPA)

Dimensions
- Length: 5,700 mm (224.4 in)
- Width: 2,100 mm (82.7 in)
- Height: 1,328 mm (52.3 in)

The Vision Mercedes-Maybach 6 is a pair of concept cars created by German car manufacturer Mercedes-Benz, under its Maybach division. The coupé version was unveiled at the 2016 Pebble Beach Concours d'Elegance, while the cabriolet version was unveiled a year later at the same show.

== Specifications and performance ==
Both concepts feature an all-electric powertrain with a claimed range of over 322 kilometres (200 mi) and a quoted electric output of 550 kW (748 PS; 738 hp), with a claimed limited top speed of 250 km/h (155 mph) and acceleration from 0–100 km/h (0–62 mph) in less than 4 seconds.

Both concepts feature 24-inch wheels. The coupé variant features 2+2 seating, a split rear window and gull-wing doors. The cabriolet version only features seating for two.

== Gallery ==
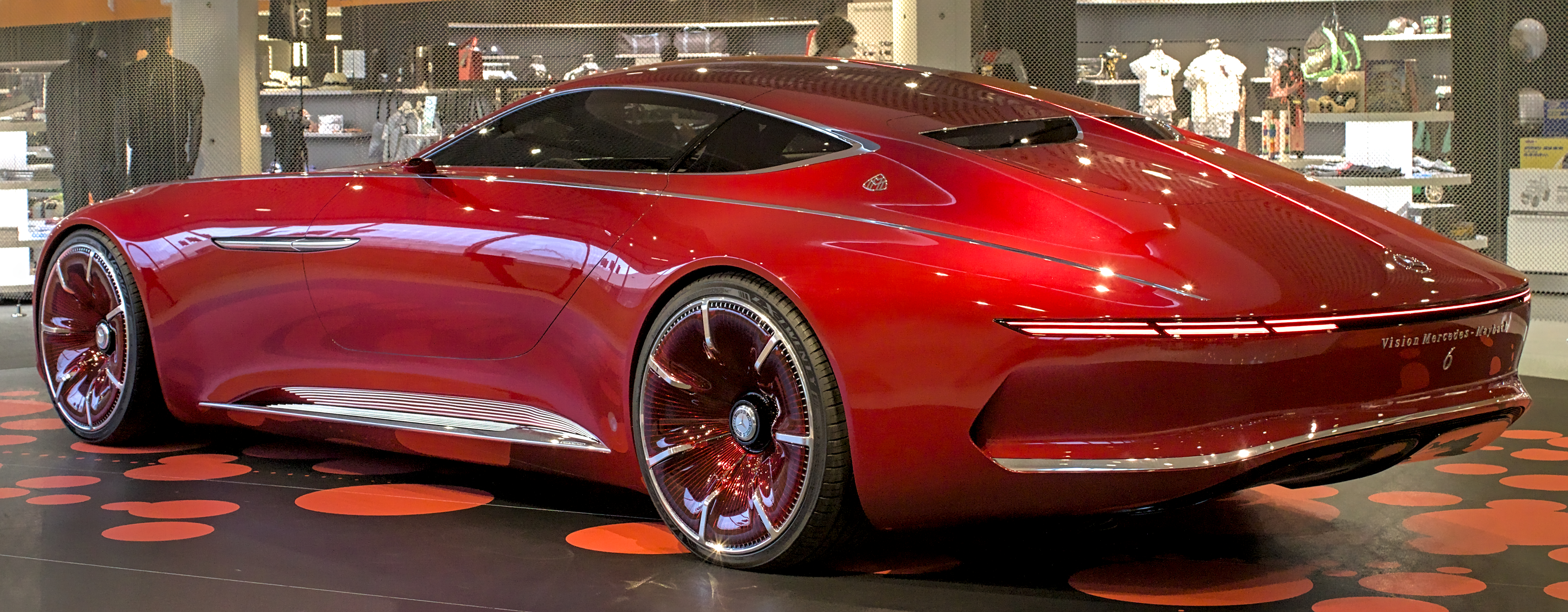
Vision Mercedes-Maybach 6 rear view

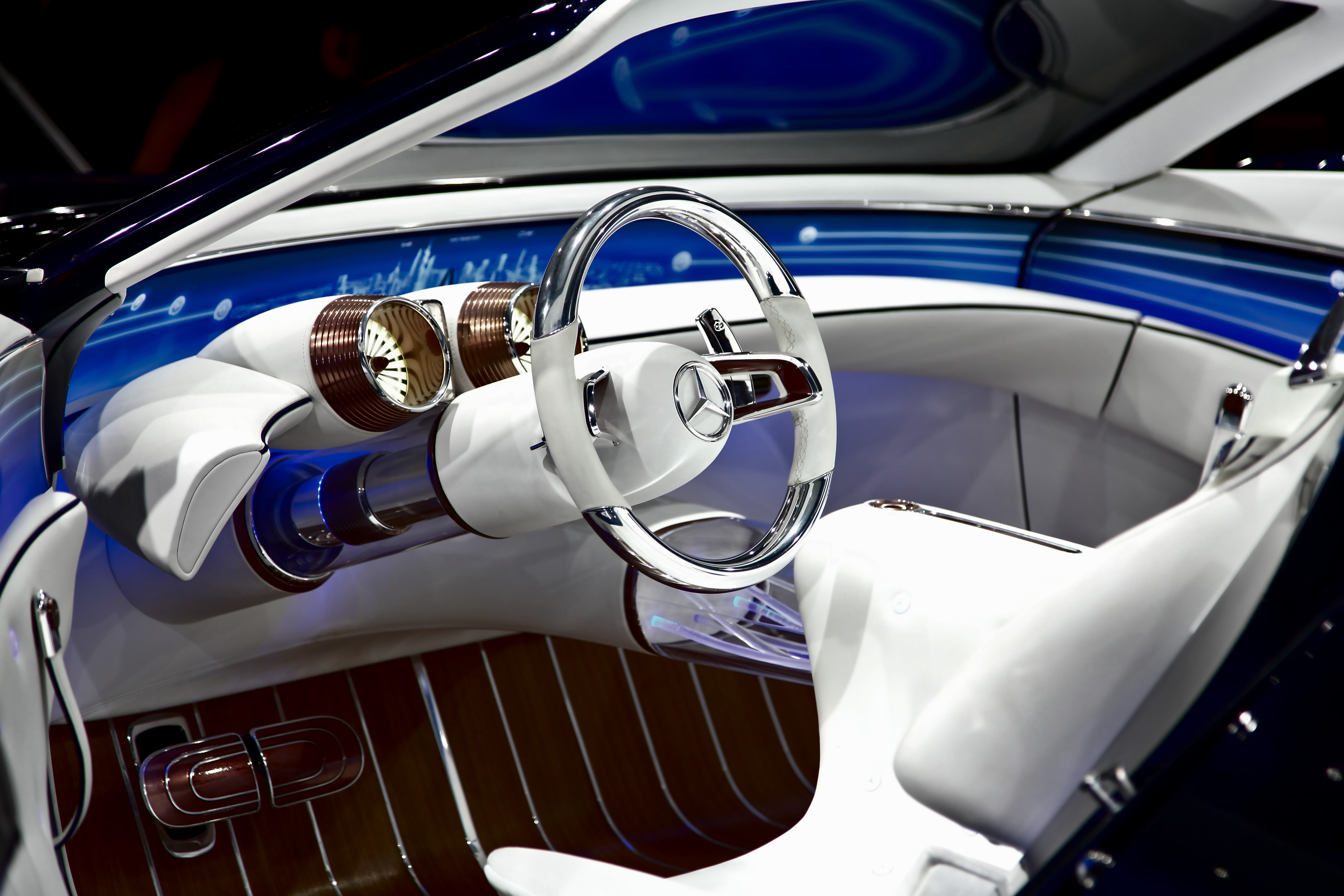
Vision Mercedes-Maybach 6 interior

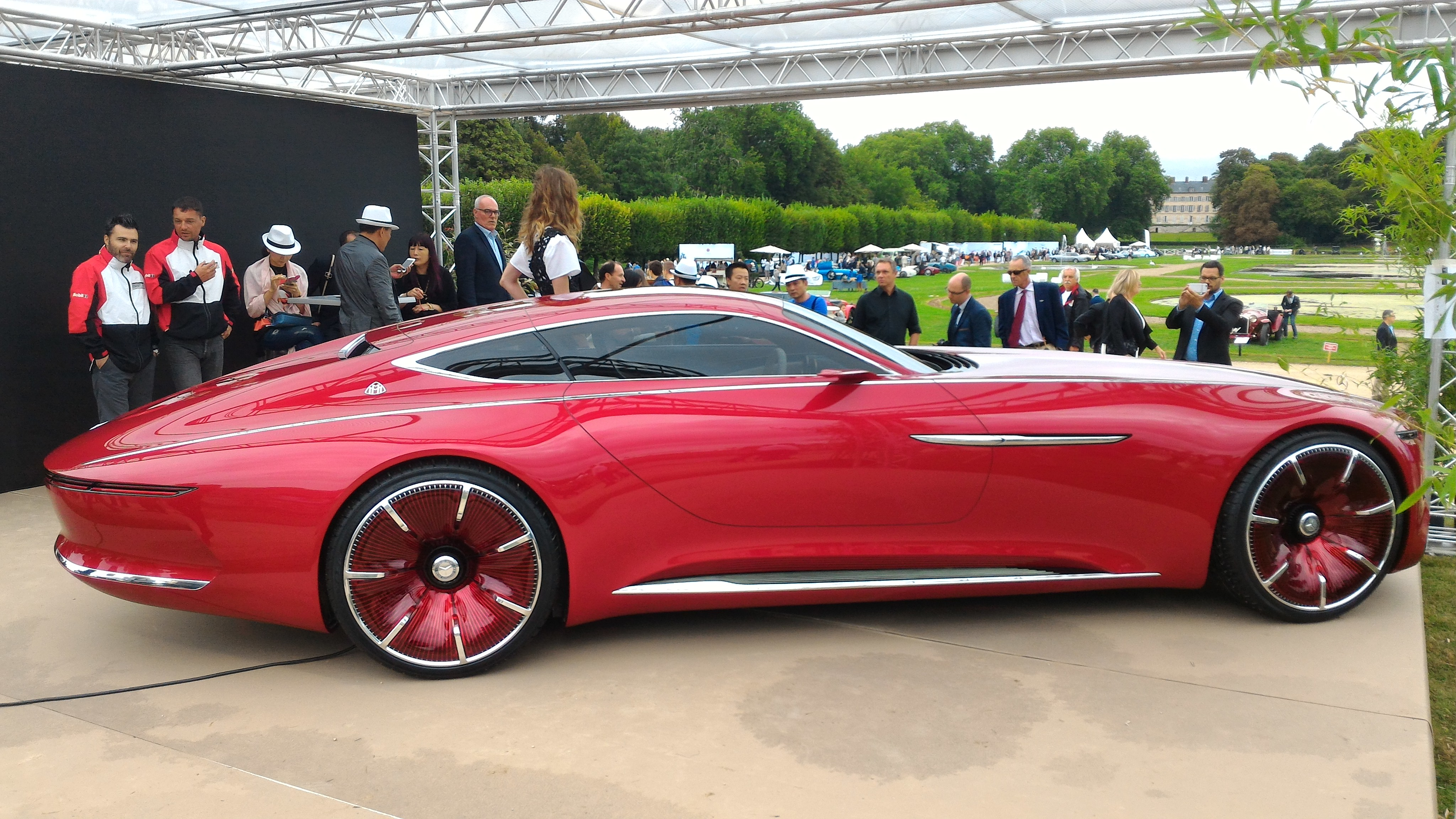
Vision Mercedes-Maybach 6 side view

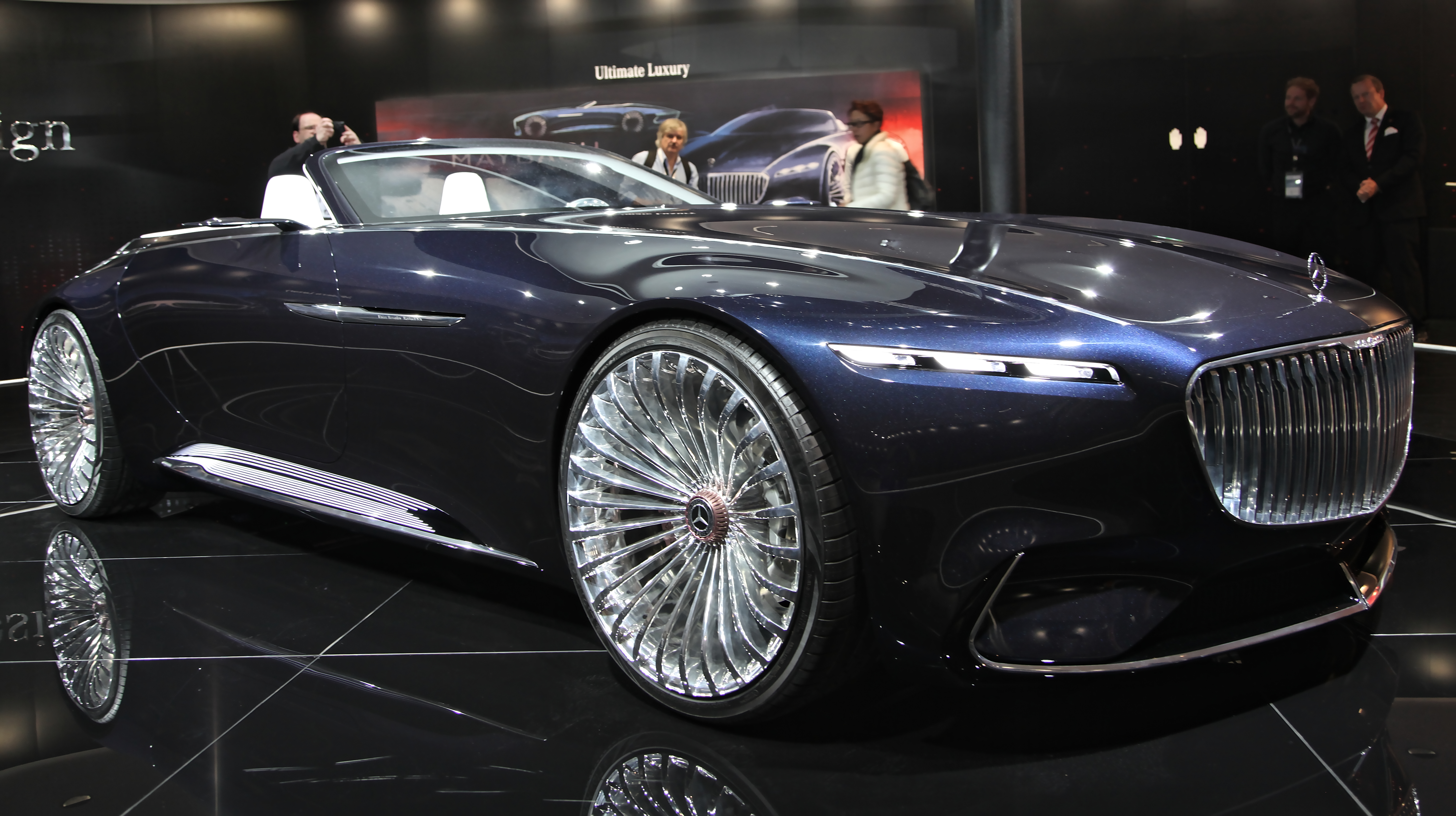
Vision Mercedes-Maybach 6 Cabriolet at the IAA 2017

Vision Mercedes Maybach 6 Cabriolet rear view

== See also ==
- Maybach Exelero
