= Mercury Messenger (concept car) =

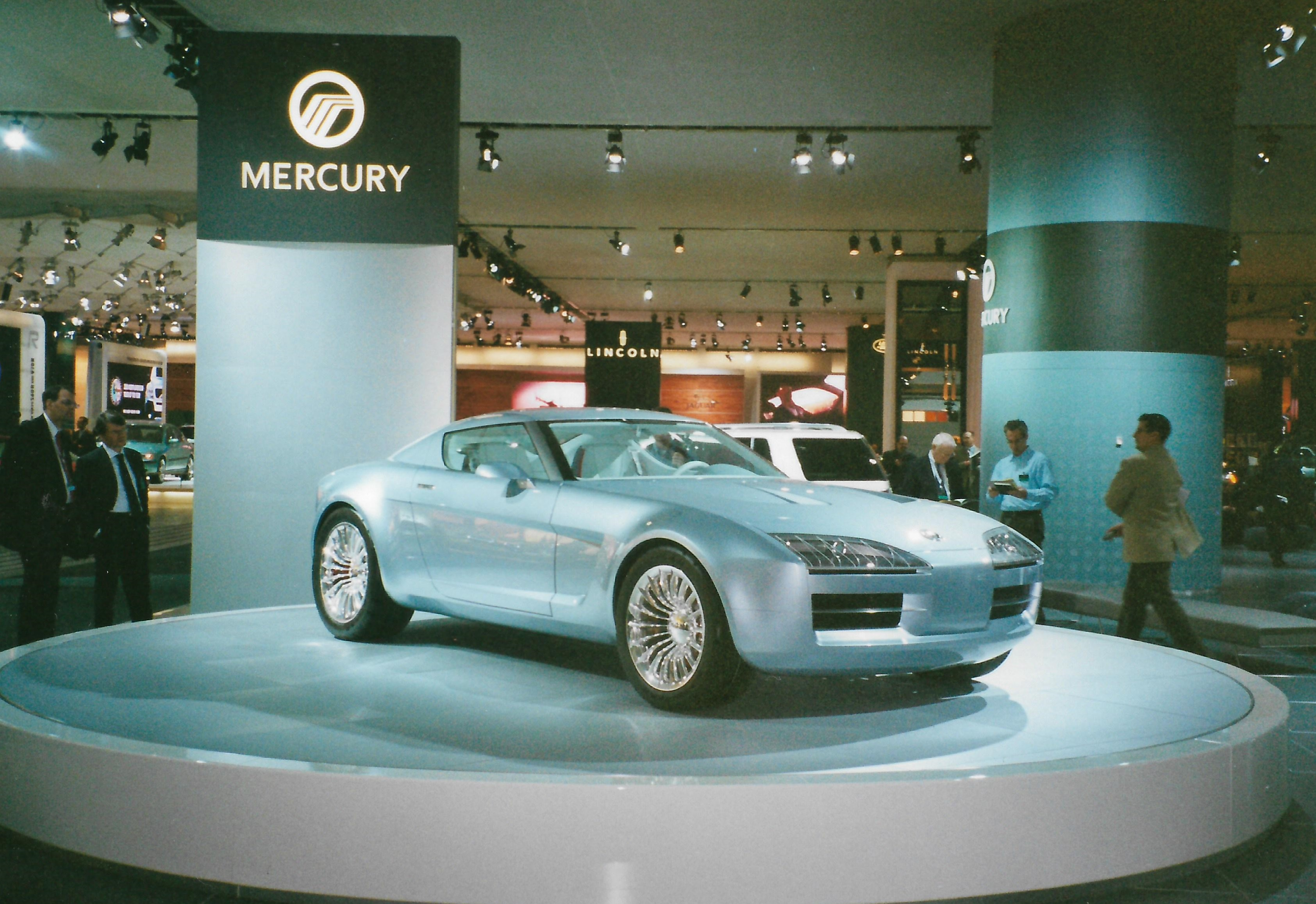
- Mercury Messenger at the 2003 Detroit Auto Show

Overview
- Manufacturer: Mercury (Ford); Stola
- Production: 2003
- Designer: Gerry McGovern

Body and chassis
- Class: Concept car
- Body style: 2-door fastback
- Layout: FR

Powertrain
- Engine: 4.6 L Modular V8
- Transmission: 6-speed automatic sequential

The Mercury Messenger is a concept car manufactured by Mercury in collaboration with coachbuilder Stola. It was revealed at the 2003 North American International Auto Show in Detroit, Michigan. The vehicle was named after Mercury, the Roman messenger god from whom Mercury gets its name.

== Design ==
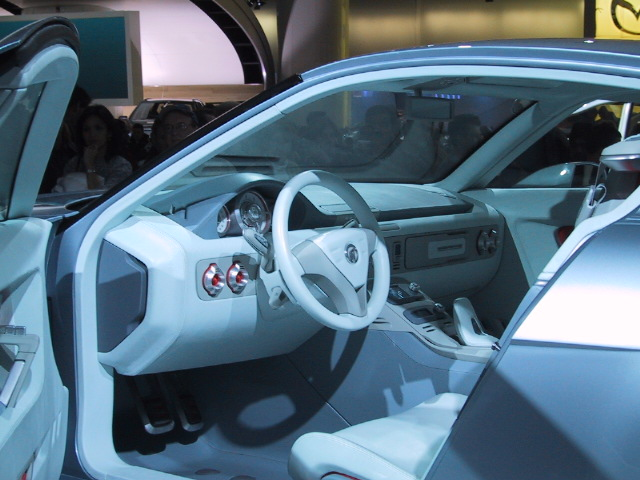
Mercury Messenger interior

Designed by Gerry McGovern, the Messenger was meant to signal the new design DNA of future Mercury models. Journalists pointed out similarities to past Ford and Mercury models, such as the Ford Cougar II concept and the Mercury Cougar.

== Specifications ==
The Messenger was intended to be powered by a 4.6 liter Modular DOHC V8 mated to a 6-speed automatic sequential transmission. It features independent rear suspension and 4-piston Brembo brake discs with anti-lock braking. The wheels feature a turbine design and measure 20 inches (510 mm) in diameter and 305 millimetres (12.0 in) wide in the rear, and 19 inches (480 mm) in diameter and 275 millimetres (10.8 in) wide in the front.

== Fate ==
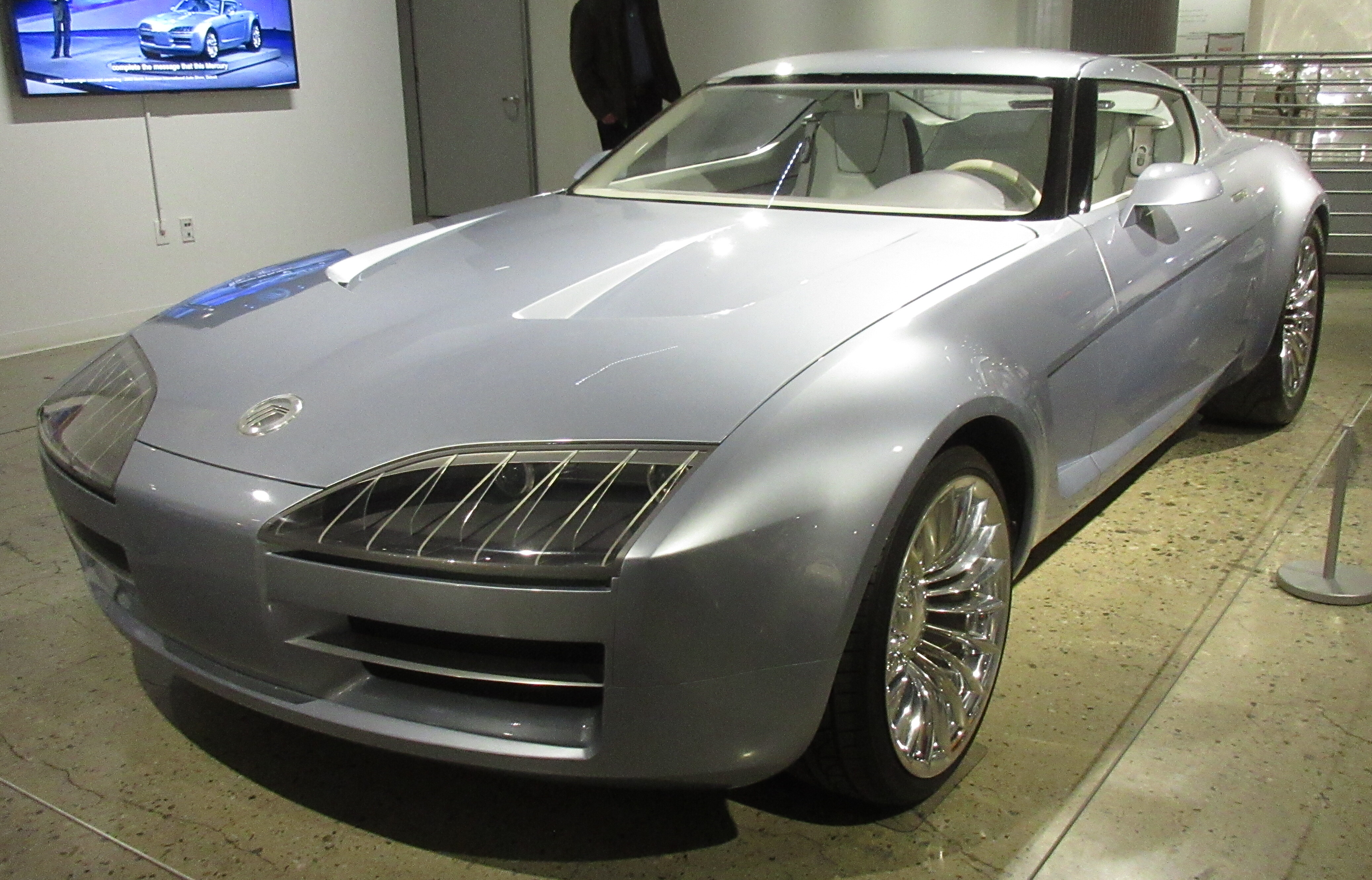
Mercury Messenger at the Petersen Automotive Museum

In 2010, the Messenger was sold at an RM Sotheby's auction, with a final price of $52,250. At the time of its sale, it had no engine or transmission, as they had reportedly never been installed by Mercury. As of 2023, it was owned by the Bortz Auto Collection and has been displayed at the Petersen Automotive Museum.
