= Stola (automotive company) =

Italian automotive company

Stola Spa
- Industry: Automotive, contract manufacturing
- Founded: 1919
- Headquarters: Rivoli, Piedmont, Italy
- Owner: Blutec
- Number of employees: 3,500 (2006)
- Website: www.stola.it

Stola is an Italian automotive company founded in 1919. From its start it realized concept cars, prototypes and style models, master models and engineering consultancy for some of the biggest manufacturers in the automotive industry.

In 2004 it was acquired by RGZ group, along with subsidiaries: Estival, Tecnocars and Stola do Brasil. By 2014 was sold to Blutec, part of the METEC group. As for 2006 it had more than 3.500 employees. Currently its activities are focused around production of limited edition exclusive cars.

== Cars and models ==
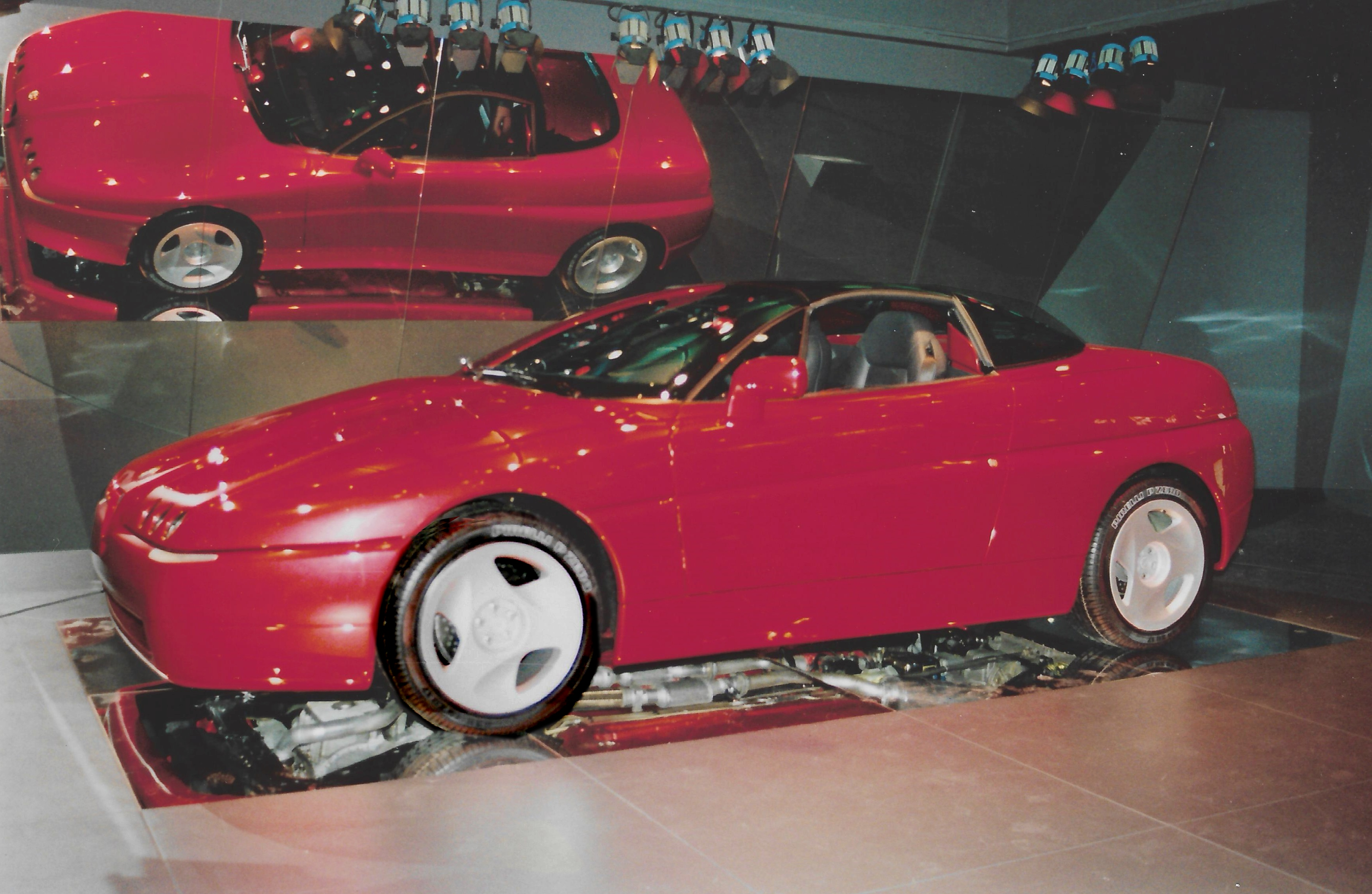
Alfa Romeo Proteo

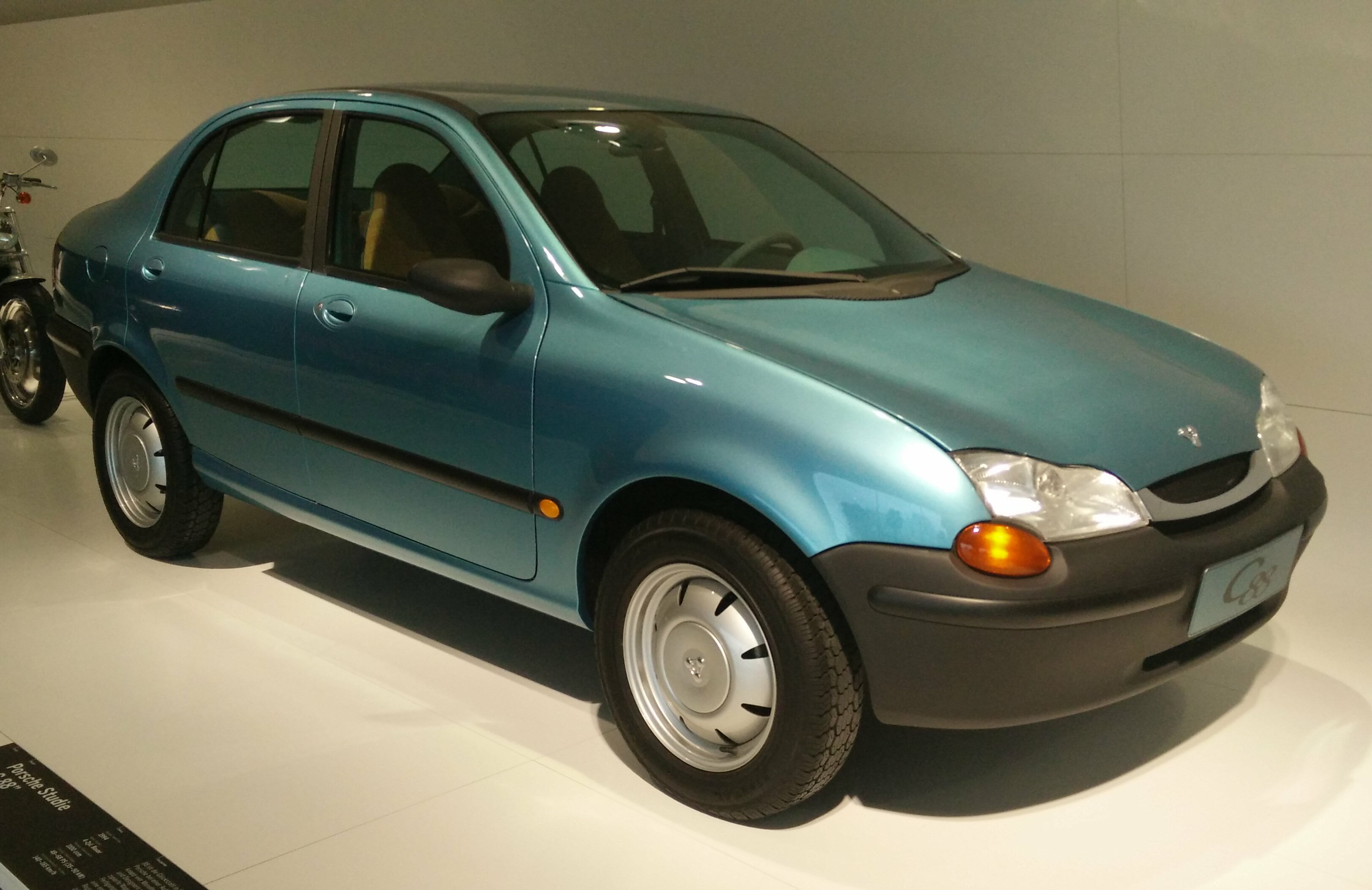
Porsche C88

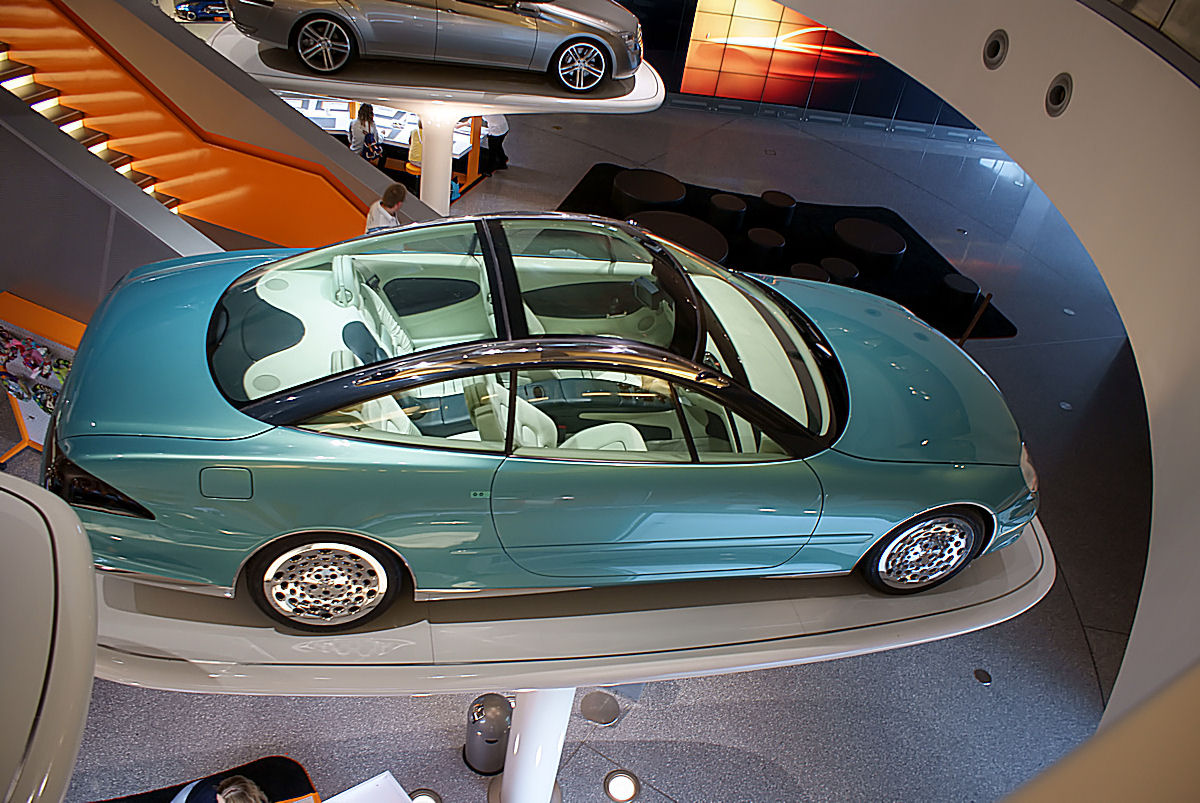
Mercedes-Benz F200 Imagination

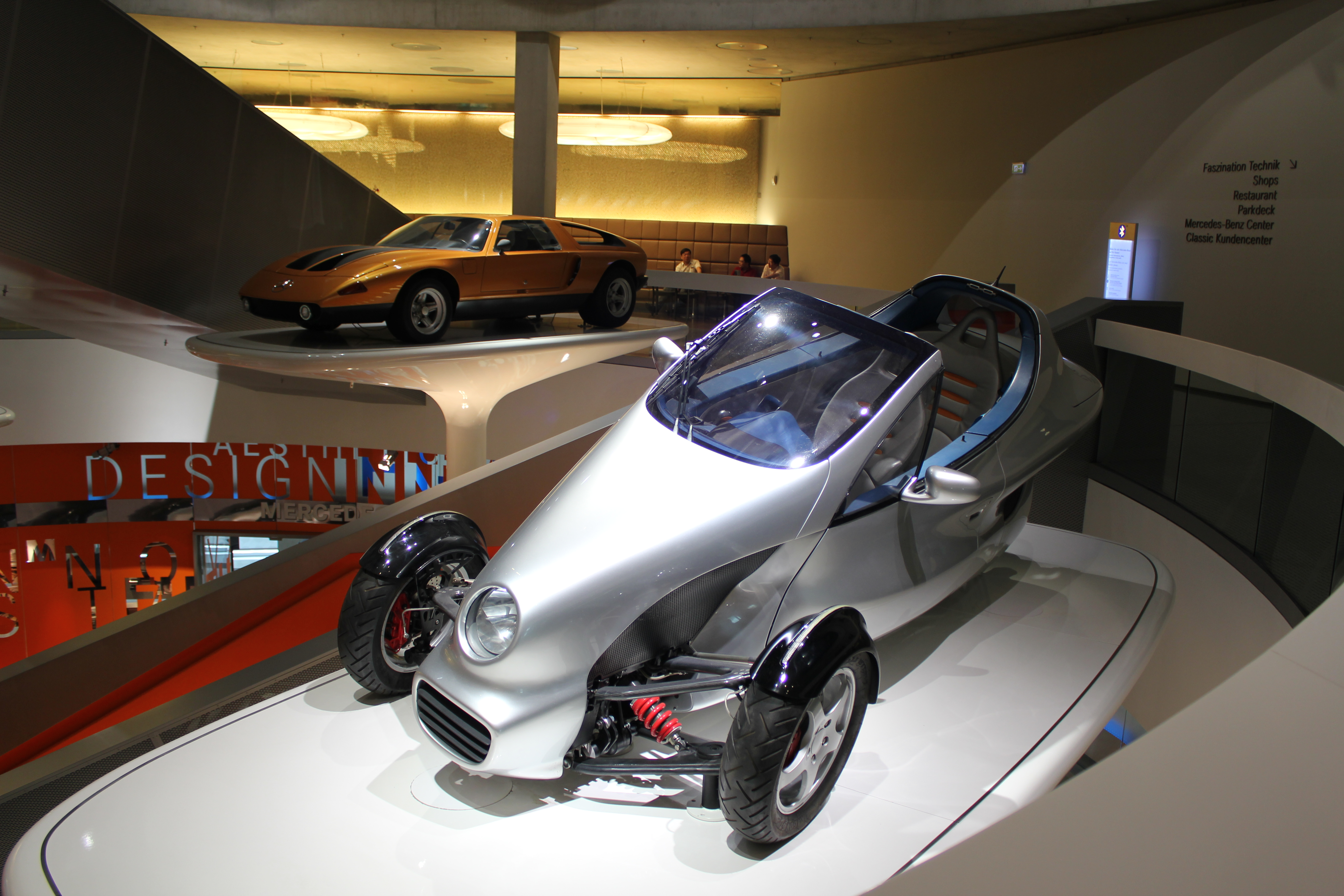
Mercedes-Benz F300 Life Jet

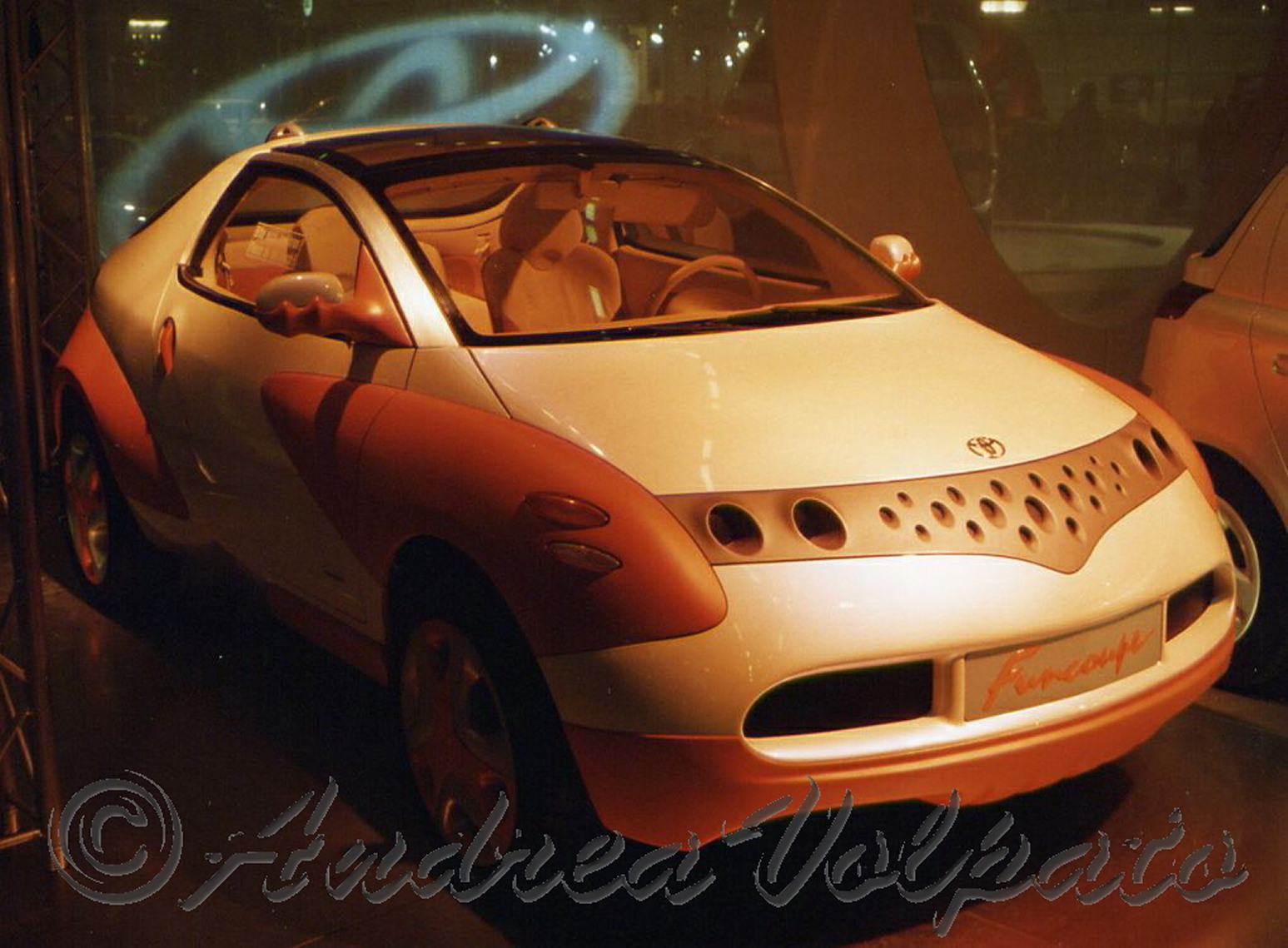
Toyota Funcoupe

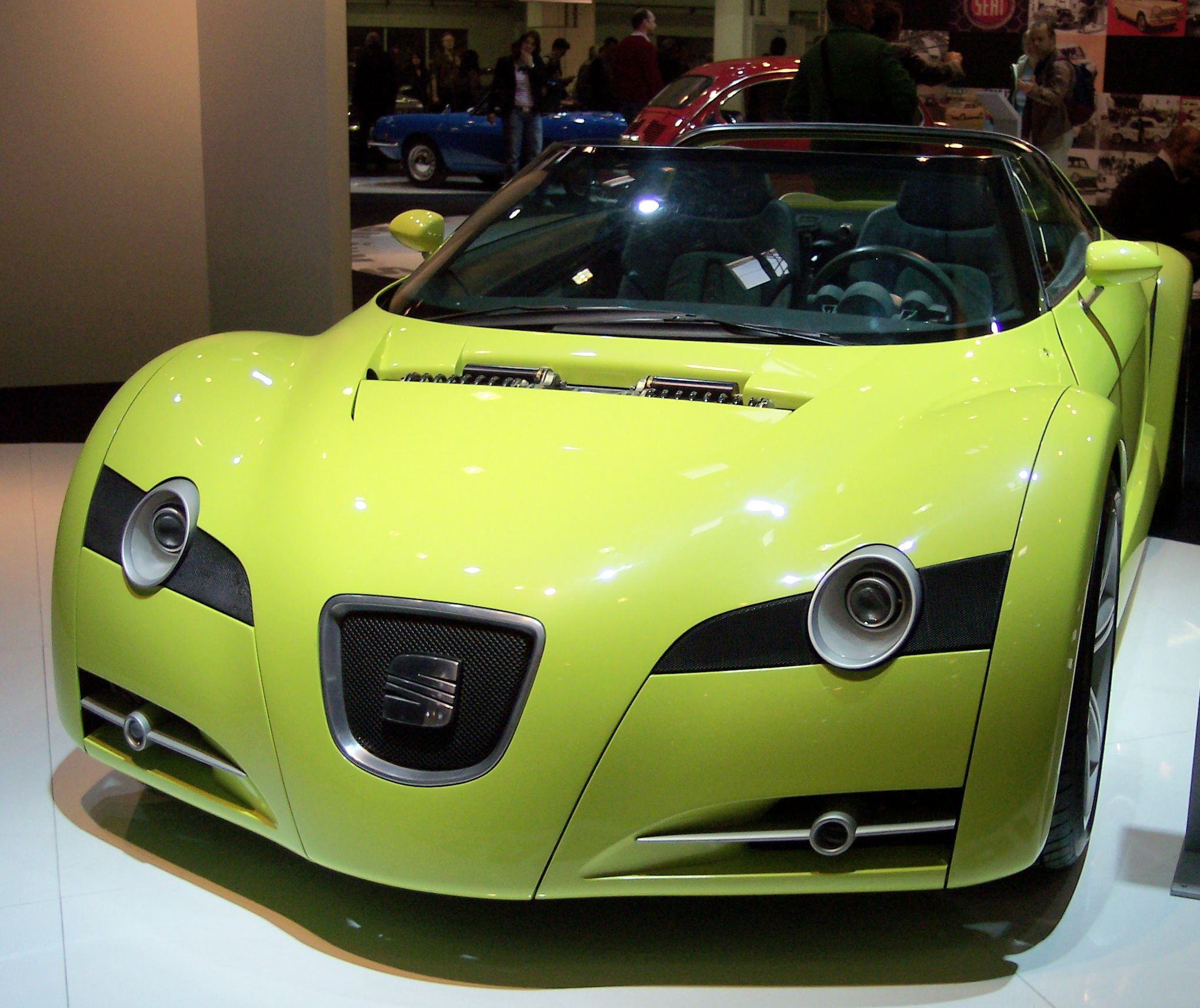
SEAT Fórmula

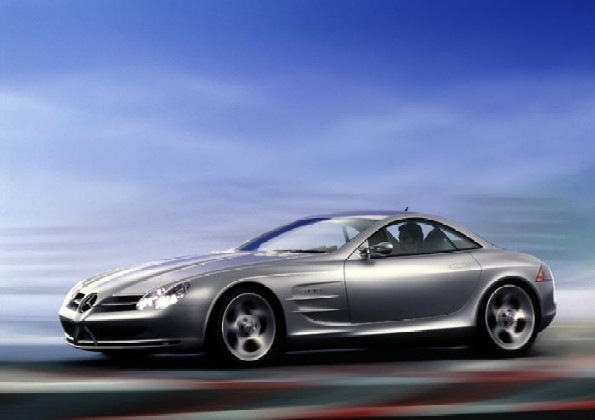
Mercedes-Benz Vision SLR

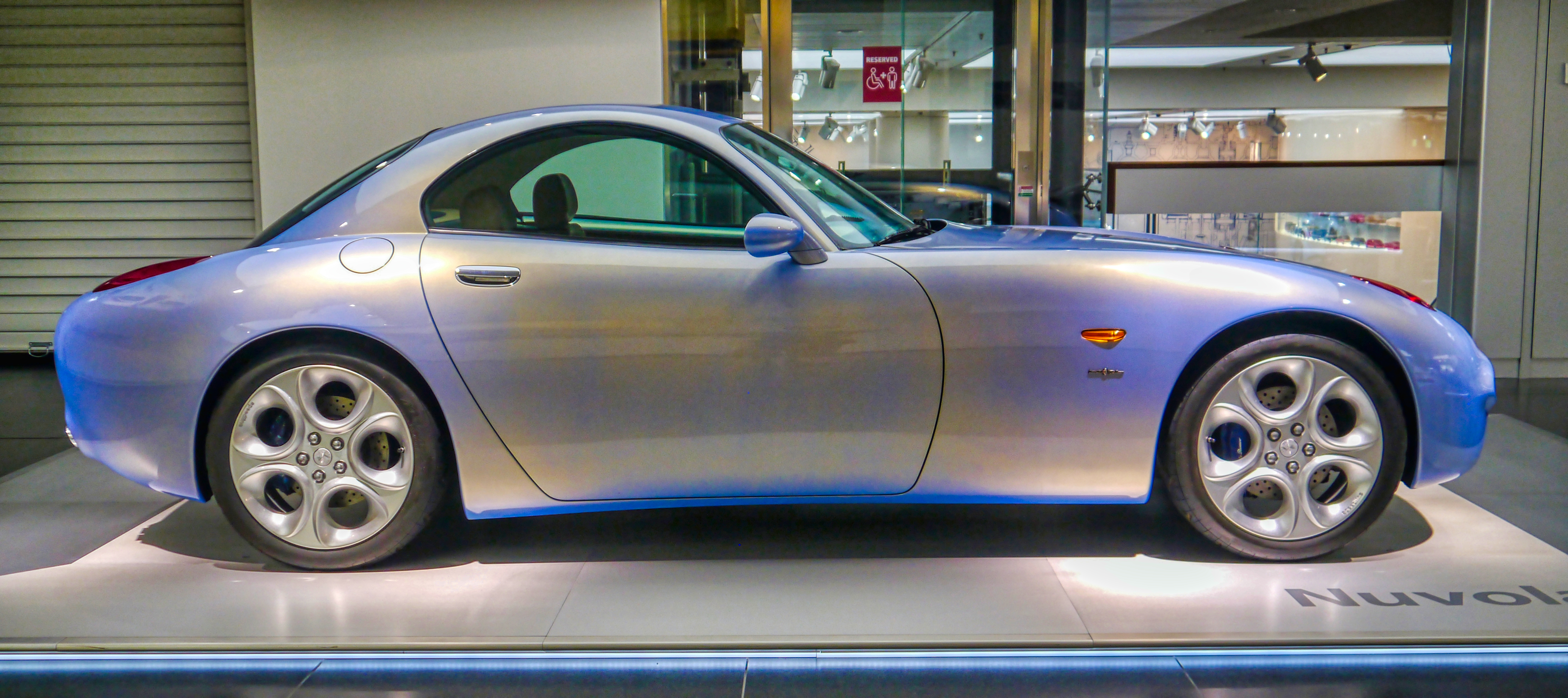
Alfa Romeo Nuvola

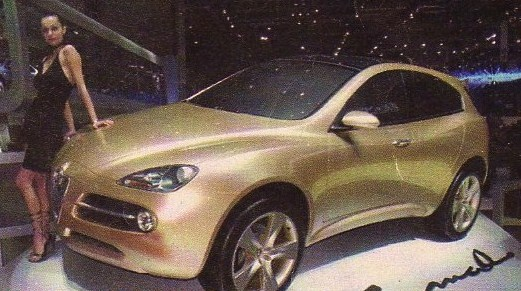
Alfa Romeo Kamal

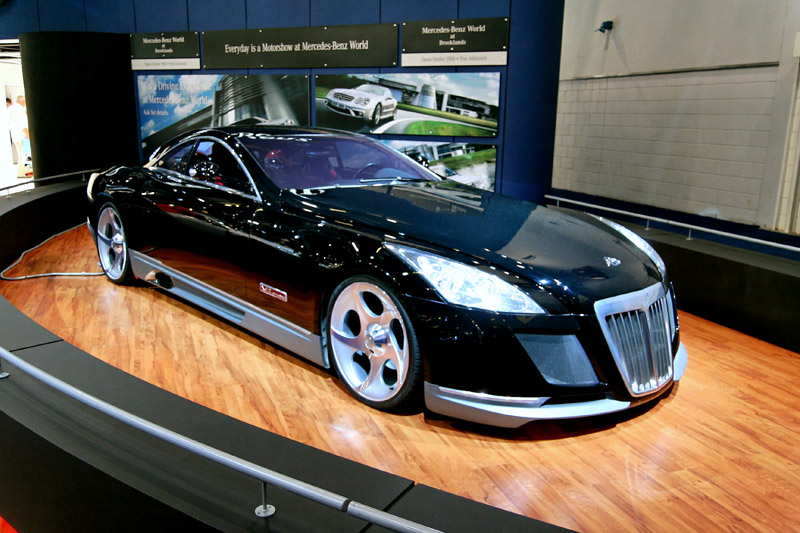
Maybach Exelero

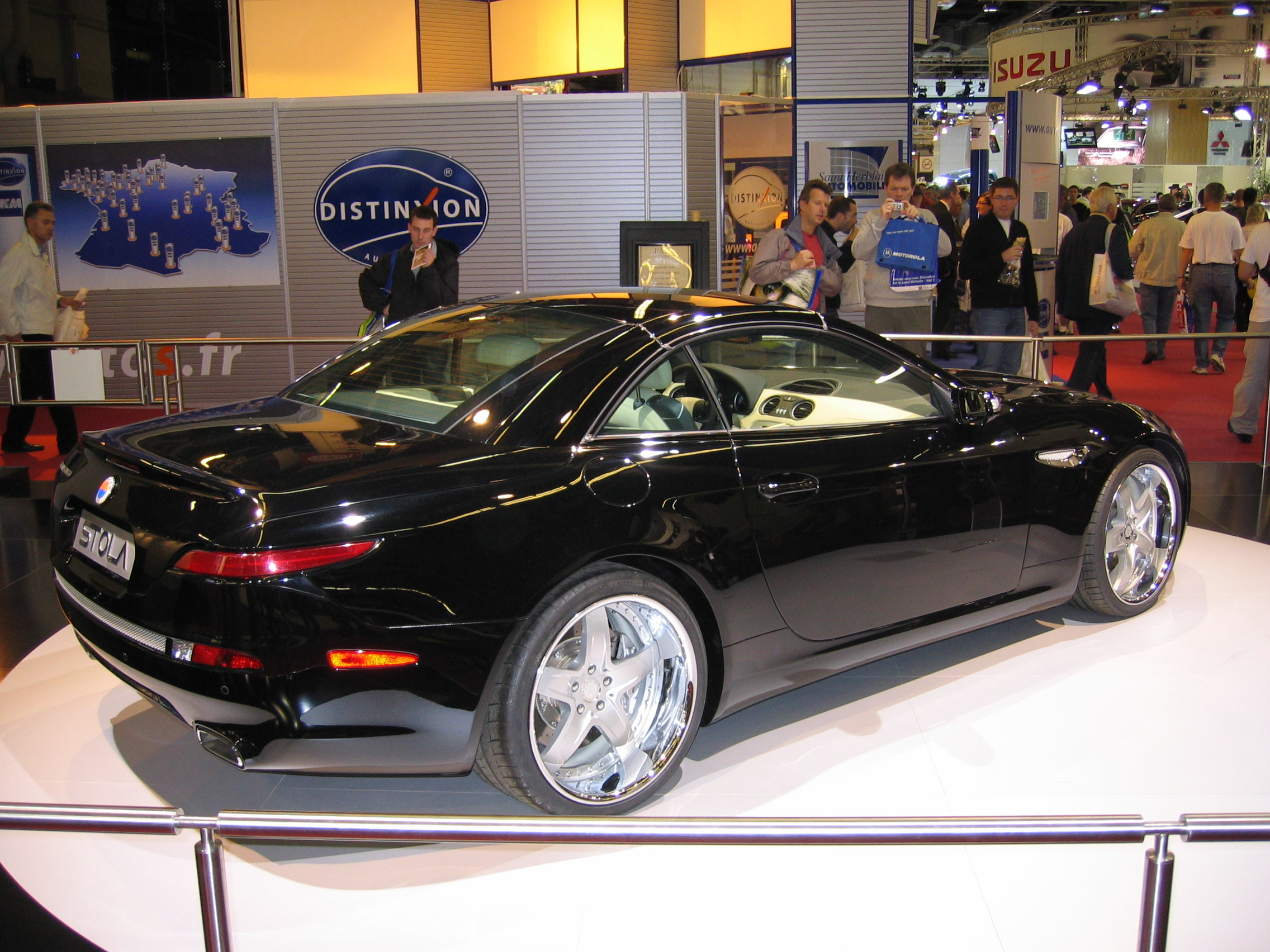
Fisker Tramonto at the 2006 Paris Auto Show

List of master models, mock-up style models, prototypes and concepts realised by Stola:

- 1960 Lancia Flavia Coupè (master model)
- 1964 Alfa Romeo Spider (master model)
- 1965 Fiat 124 Coupè (master model)
- 1965 Autobianchi A111 (master model)
- 1965 Ferrari 365 GT 2+2 (master model)
- 1966 Isuzu 117 Coupé (master model)
- 1967 Alfa Romeo 1750 GT Coupé Giugiaro (master model)
- 1980 Lancia 037 (master model)
- 1981 Ferrari Testarossa (master model)
- 1985 Cadillac Allanté (master model and engineering)
- 1987–1988 Saab 900 NG (mock-up style model)
- 1989 Saab 9000 CS (master model)
- 1989 Bugatti EB 110 (style model)
- 1989–1990 Ferrari 456 (engineering)
- 1989–1993 Lancia Kappa (master model, engineering and styling models with Autec)
- 1990–1991 Alfa Romeo Proteo (concept car, with Centro Stile Alfa Romeo)
- 1991 Fiat Barchetta (style model, with Centro Stile Fiat)
- 1991, 1993 BMW Z13 (2 concept cars)
- 1991–1992 Fiat Downtown (2 show cars)
- 1991–1992 Fiat Cinquecento Cita (concept car, developed for Fiat with Itca and Maggiora)
- 1991–1992 Fiat Panda Destriero (limited production of 2 units)
- 1991–1992 Ferrari 348 Spider (engineering and 3 prototypes)
- 1992–1993 Ferrari 550 Maranello (engineering)
- 1992 Lancia Ypsilon (840) (style models)
- 1992–1994 Alfa Romeo 166 (style model)
- 1992–1994 Fioravanti "New Large" (with Fiat) and "Nuova Piccola" (style models)
- 1993 Lamborghini Diablo VT Roadster (master model)
- 1994 Mercedes-Benz FCC (show car)
- 1994 Porsche C88 (concept car)
- 1994–1995 Alfa Romeo 156 (style models and engineering)
- 1995 BMW 3 Series (E46) (style model)
- 1995 Saab 9-5 (mock-up style models)
- 1995 Mini Spiritual and Spiritual Too (concept cars)
- 1995–1997 Maserati 3200 GT (engineering)
- 1995–1996 Mercedes-Benz C-Class SportCoupé (CL203, six different style models)
- 1995–1996 Mercedes-Benz Vision F 200 Imagination (concept car)
- 1995–1996 Bitter Berlina (show car, intended for limited production)
- 1996 Fiat Multipla (show car)
- 1996 Alfa Romeo Nuvola (concept car, with Centro Stile Alfa Romeo)
- 1996 Saab 9-3 (mock-up style models)
- 1996–1998 Lancia Lybra (style models)
- 1996–1997 Ferrari 456M (style model)
- 1996–1997 Mercedes-Benz Maybach (concept car)
- 1997 Alfa Romeo 147 (style model, with Centro Stile Alfa Romeo)
- 1997 Mercedes-Benz F300 Life Jet (show car)
- 1997 Mercedes-Benz SLK (R170, shooting brake style model)
- 1997 Toyota Funcargo (concept car)
- 1997 Toyota Funcoupe (concept car)
- 1997 Toyota Yaris Verso (style models)
- 1997 Nissan Cedric Y34 (mock-up style model)
- 1997 SEAT Bolero 330 BT (concept car)
- 1997–2000 Perodua Kancil (engineering)
- 1997–1998 Mercedes-Benz Vision SLR
- 1997–1998 IED Crab (mock-up style model)
- 1998 Eurovans (Lancia Phedra, Citroën C8 and Fiat Ulysse, style models)
- 1998 Mercedes-Benz A-Class (W168, show car)
- 1998–1999 Porsche Cayenne (style models)
- 1998–1999 Alfa Romeo 156 Sportwagon (engineering)
- 1998–1999 Lancia Thesis (style models)
- 1998 Ford FC5 (mock-up style model)
- 1998–1999 SEAT Fórmula (concept car)
- 1999 Mercedes-Benz A 38 AMG (W168, show car)
- 1999 Mercedes-Benz Vision SLR Roadster
- 1999 Mercedes-Benz Vision SLA (show car)
- 1999 Smart Roadster (show car)
- 1999 Maserati Quattroporte V (engineering)
- 1999–2000 Maserati Coupé and Spyder (engineering)
- 2000 Ferrari 575M Maranello (style models and engineering)
- 2000 Nissan Fusion (concept car, with F&S)
- 2000 Smart Roadster Coupé (show car)
- 2000 Lancia Ypsilon (843) (style models)
- 2000–2001 Lincoln MK9 (concept car)
- 2000–2001 Alfa Romeo 156 GTA (styling models/prototypes)
- 2000–2001 Nissan Crossbow (concept car)
- 2000–2001 Nissan Kino (concept car)
- 2000–2002 Ferrari 612 Scaglietti (engineering)
- 2001 Saab 9-X (mock-up style model)
- 2001 Mitsubishi CZ2 (show car)
- 2001 Mercedes-Benz CLS (C219, three styling models, one as a station wagon)
- 2001 Smart Forfour (show car)
- 2001 Smart Crossblade (show car)
- 2001 Alfa Romeo 166 (facelift style model)
- 2001 Alfa Romeo 159 (style model of Centro Stile Alfa Romeo proposal)
- 2001 Alfa Romeo 159 Sportwagon (engineering)
- 2001 Porsche Cayman (mock-up style models)
- 2001–2002 Mercedes-Benz Vision Grand Sport Tourer (1st show car)
- 2002 Kia KCV-II (concept car)
- 2002 Lincoln Navicross (concept car)
- 2002 Mercury Messenger (concept car)
- 2002 Ferrari 599 GTB Fiorano (engineering)
- 2002 Maserati MC12 (engineering)
- 2002–2003 Alfa Romeo Kamal (mock-up style model, with Centro Stile Alfa Romeo)
- 2002–2003 Range Stormer (concept car)
- 2003 Proton GEN•2 (engineering)
- 2003 Mercedes-Benz Vision Grand Sport Tourer (2nd show car)
- 2003–2004 Hyundai E3 (concept car)
- 2004 Ford Focus Vignale Cabriolet (concept car)
- 2004 Maybach Exelero (show car)
- 2006 Citroën C-Métisse (concept car)
- 2007 Fisker Tramonto (production of a small series of 17 cars)

=== Stola S81 Stratos ===
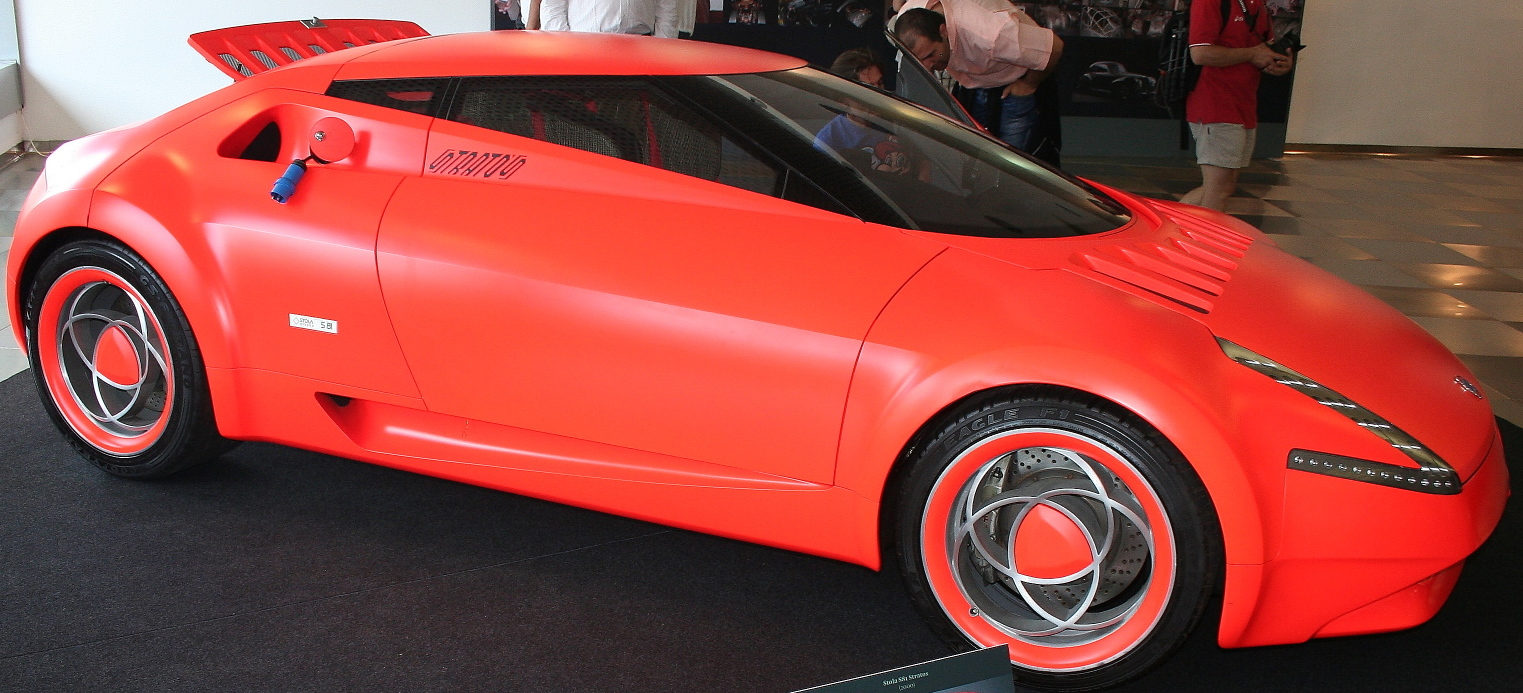
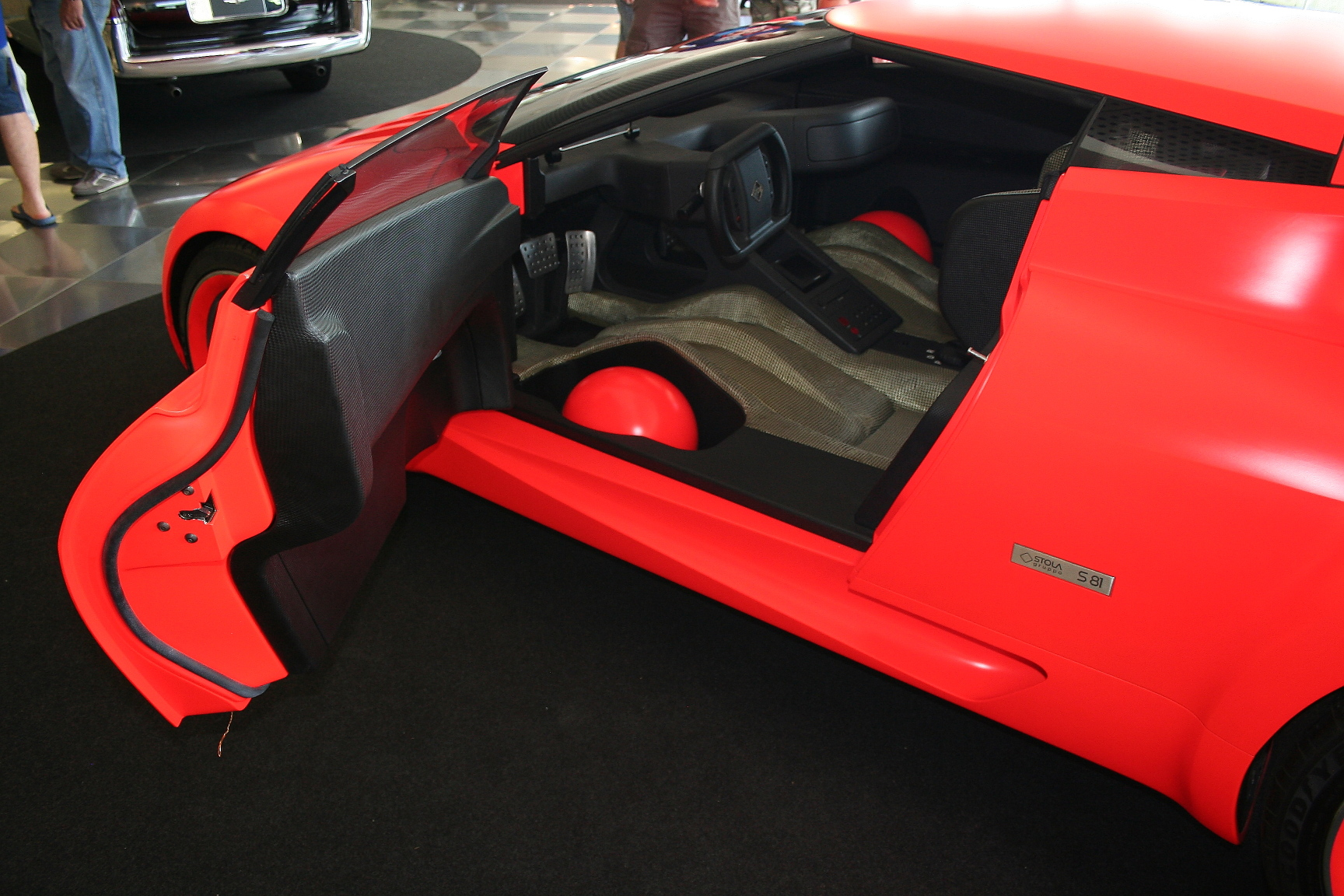
Stola S81 Stratos

Stola S81 Stratos was a concept car designed by Marcello Gandini and shown at the 2000 Turin Motor Show. Its exterior design was a hommage to Gandini's original 1970 Lancia Stratos HF Zero exactly at the 30th anniversary of the 1970 Turin Motor Show presentation. Development began in autumn of 1999 to create a static show car. The front was meant to have a Lancia shield but with protest from Fiat management, a stylised mg logo appears in honour of the designer instead. Vivid orange paint colour chosen mirrored that of a prototype Stratos HF. "S81" in its name commemorates the 81st anniversary of the company founding by Alfred Stola. From 2009 concept resides in the Lopresto automobile collection, where in 2014 it received an electric motor.

=== Stola S82 Spyder ===
In 2001, at the Milan Motor Show, Stola presented a prototype model S82 Spyder built on the Porsche Boxster (986) basis. Exterior was designed by Aldo Brovarone.

=== Stola S85 Thesis Limousine ===
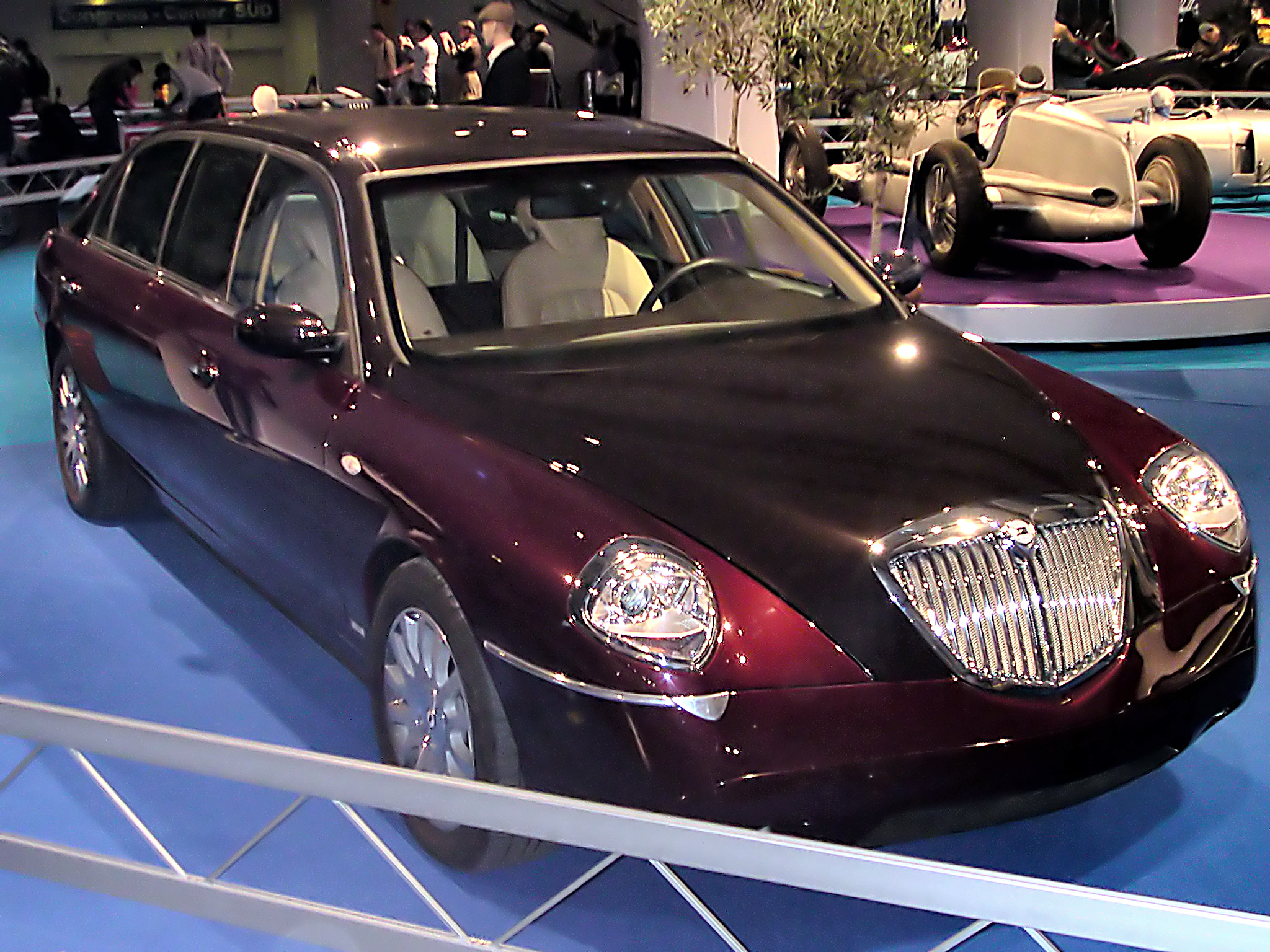
Stola S85

During the engineering consultancy work done for the Thesis model in 2000, Stola proposed a stretched limousine version, similar to the previous Thema and Kappa. Fiat Group CEO Paolo Cantarella agreed to the project but under the supervision of Giancarlo Concilio of Centro Stile Lancia and engineer Nevio Di Giusto. Initially Stola planned to showcase the blue-gray painted prototype at the 2001 Frankfurt Motor Show but at the last minute Fiat management decided to postpone the presentation. Although the show car was ready earlier and would be named as "S82" it was ultimately presented at the 2004 Geneva Motor Show repainted in burgundy bi-colour and renamed as the "Stola S85" to celebrate the Stola company's 85 years.

The car is equipped with a beige leather interior and electrically adjustable rear seats. The car has also a minibar with refrigerator, multimedia system with GPS navigation system, internet access, fax machine and a DVD player. With 230 PS (169 kW; 227 hp) and all these extra features the converted car weighs 2,030 kg (4,475 lb) and can accelerate from 0 to 100 km/h (62 mph) in 9.2 seconds, with a top speed of 230 km/h (143 mph). In 2002 Fiat ordered another stretched limousine for President of the Republic Carlo Azeglio Ciampi and further two examples which would ultimately be cancelled. Presidential limousine would receive an armour plating by specialist shop Repetti and be delivered in 2003.

=== Stola S86 Diamante ===
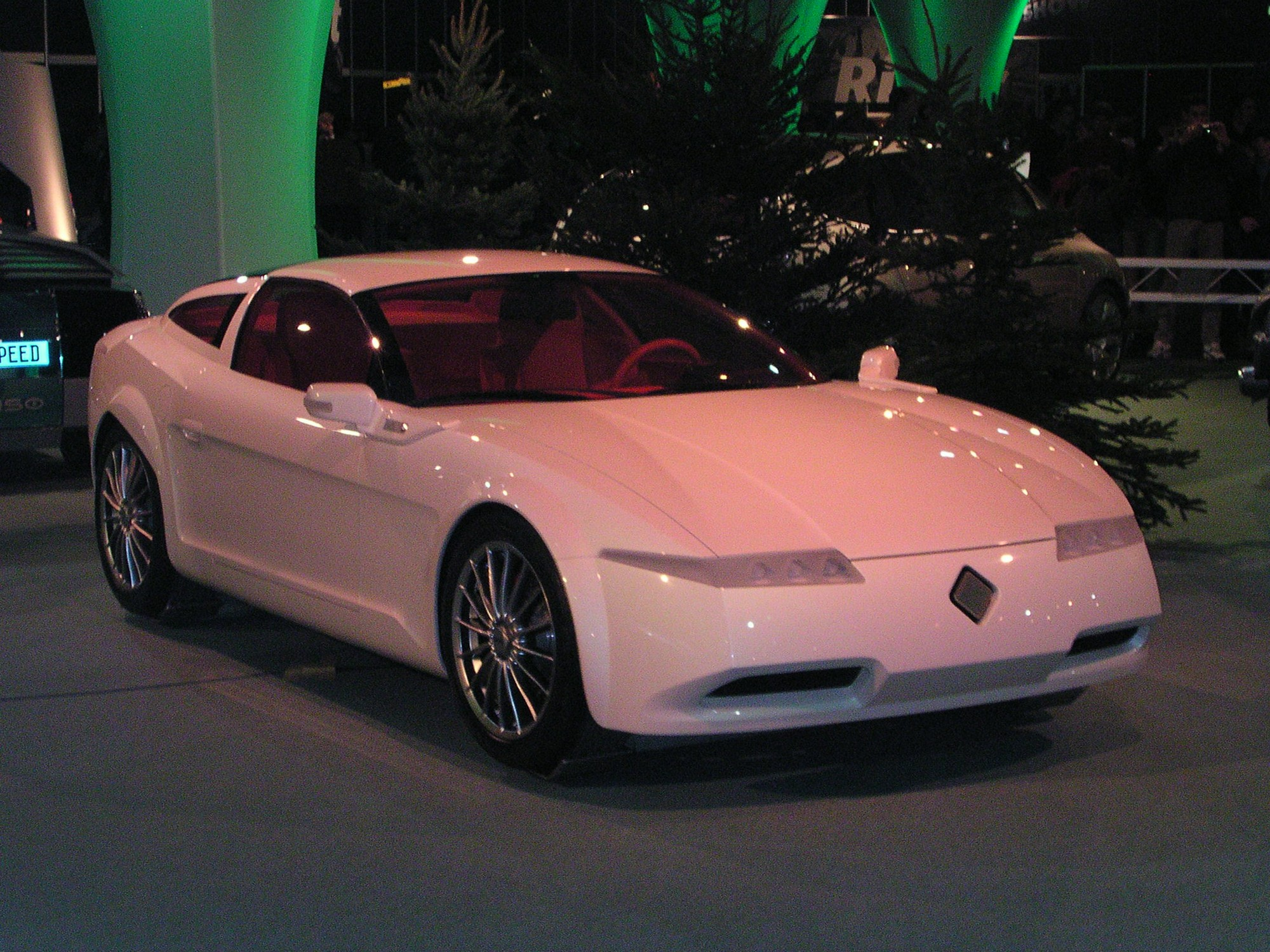
Stola S86 Diamante

Stola S86 diamante is a concept car designed by Marcello Gandini and presented at the 75th Geneva Motor Show in 2005. It is a static model of a coupé, created in just 5 weeks to demonstrate Stola's ability and speed in development and construction of automotive prototypes in a "tailor-made engineering" perspective.

The name is also a reference to the company's 86 years of activity.

=== Stola Phalcon ===
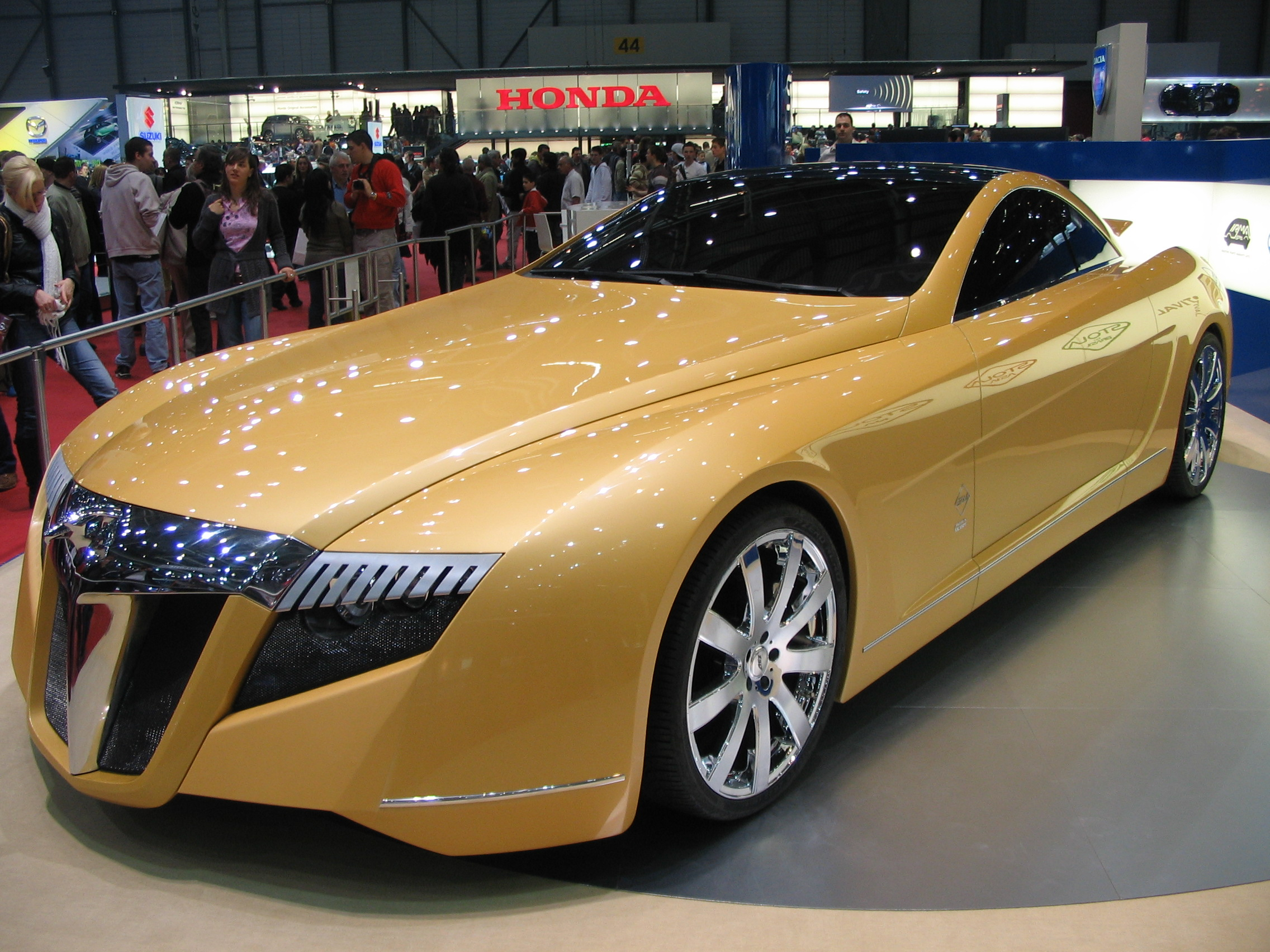
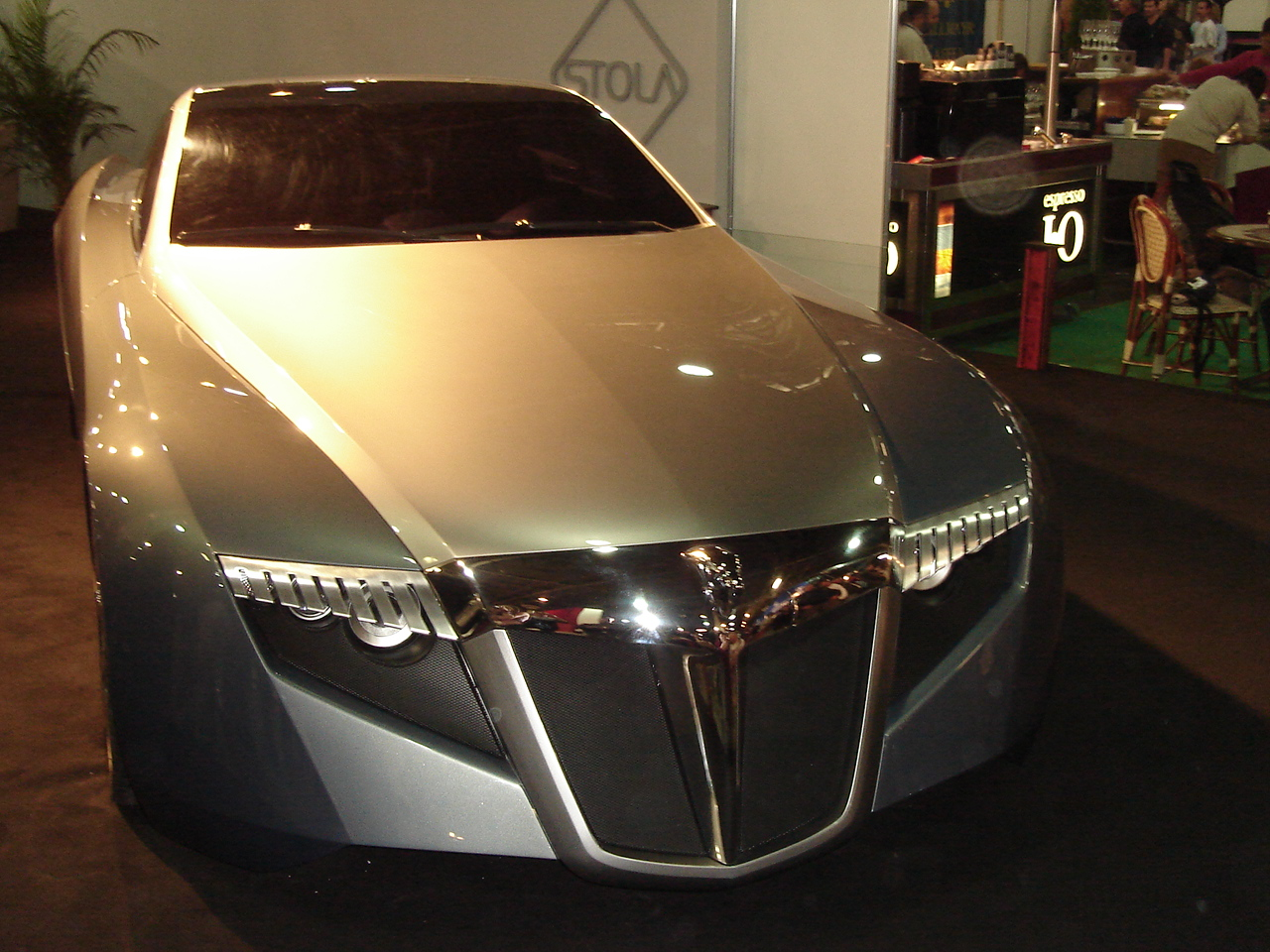
Stola Phalcon

At the 2007 Geneva Motor Show, Stola introduced the Phalcon, a 2-door coupe with a similar design as the Maybach Exelero that Stola had in 2004. The car was presented with a Mercedes-Benz V12 and a one piece windshield extending all the way to the back of the car. The plan was to produce 25 units.

== Notable designers ==
- Aldo Brovarone
- Aldo Garnero

== See also ==
- Blutec
- Studiotorino (successor coachbuilder)
- List of Italian companies
- List of automobile manufacturers of Italy
