= Blutec =

Blutec Srl
- Industry: Automotive, contract manufacturing
- Founded: March 2014; 12 years ago
- Headquarters: Pescara, Italy
- Area served: Worldwide
- Number of employees: 4,000 (2016)
- Subsidiaries: Stola
- Website: www.blutecsrl.it

Blutec Srl is a brand owned by Metec SpA, created in 2014 by acquiring the Italian automotive company Stola, which was founded in Turin in 1919. It is known for having taken over the former FIAT factory in Termini Imerese.

== Activities ==
Blutec inherited Stola Group activities, namely the production of car components. The production and design is carried out by 10 factories and 6 engineering offices deployed between Italy and Brazil.

In 2016, the company was helped by Invitalia and its 94 million euros to re-employ 120 ex-employees of Fiat Chrysler Automobiles in Termini Imerese, a suburb of Palermo.

In September 2019, the owner of Metec SpA (Roberto Ginatta) and the CEO of Blutec, Cosimo Di Cursi, were investigated by prosecutors in Turin and Palermo for misappropriating 16 million euros from the Invitalia funds.

In June 2020, the 76 year old Roberto Ginatta was incarcerated, while Matteo Orlando Ginatta and Giovanna Desiderato were placed under house arrest, in the matter of the fraudulent sequestration of a big chunk of the Blutec-Invitalia funds.

On 20 December 2020, Metec SpA was declared bankrupt, while the Ginatta family had bought themselves a mansion in the woods of La Mandria regional park near Turin. The mansion has a floor area of 1,700 square meters (over 18,000 square feet) and 46 rooms and is equipped with various garages and a swimming pool; the surrounding wood (also subjected to seizure) extends for almost 5 hectares.

== See also ==
- Stola
- List of Italian companies
- Contract manufacturing
