= Active suspension =

Type of automotive suspension

An active suspension is a type of automotive suspension that uses an onboard control system to control the vertical movement of the vehicle's wheels and axles relative to the chassis or vehicle frame, rather than the conventional passive suspension that relies solely on large springs to maintain static support and dampen the vertical wheel movements caused by the road surface. Active suspensions are divided into two classes: true active suspensions, and adaptive or semi-active suspensions. While adaptive suspensions only vary shock absorber firmness to match changing road or dynamic conditions, active suspensions use some type of actuator to raise and lower the chassis independently at each wheel.

These technologies allow car manufacturers to achieve a greater degree of ride quality and car handling by keeping the chassis parallel to the road when turning corners, preventing unwanted contacts between the vehicle frame and the ground (especially when going over a depression), and allowing overall better traction and steering control. An onboard computer detects body movement from sensors throughout the vehicle and, using that data, controls the action of the active and semi-active suspensions. The system virtually eliminates body roll and pitch variation in many driving situations including cornering, accelerating and braking. When used on commercial vehicles such as buses, active suspension can also be used to temporarily lower the vehicle's floor, thus making it easier for passengers to board and exit the vehicle.

== Principle ==
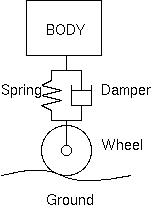
Figure 1

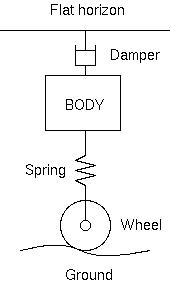
Figure 2

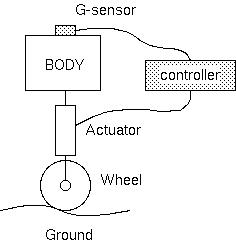
Figure 3

Skyhook theory is that the ideal suspension would let the vehicle maintain a stable posture, unaffected by weight transfer or road surface irregularities, as if suspended from an imaginary hook in the sky continuing at a constant altitude above sea level, therefore remaining stable.

Since an actual skyhook is obviously impractical, real active suspension systems are based on actuator operations. The imaginary line (of zero vertical acceleration) is calculated based on the value provided by an acceleration sensor installed on the body of the vehicle (see Figure 3). The dynamic elements comprise only the linear spring and the linear damper; therefore, no complicated calculations are necessary.

A vehicle contacts the ground through the spring and damper in a normal spring damper suspension, as in Figure 1. To achieve the same level of stability as the Skyhook theory, the vehicle must contact the ground through the spring, and the imaginary line with the damper, as in Figure 2. Theoretically, in a case where the damping coefficient reaches an infinite value, the vehicle will be in a state where it is completely fixed to the imaginary line, thus the vehicle will not shake.

== Active ==
Active suspensions, the first to be introduced, use separate actuators which can exert an independent force on the suspension to improve the riding characteristics. The drawbacks of this design are high cost, added complication and mass of the apparatus, and the need for frequent maintenance on some implementations. Maintenance can require specialised tools, and some problems can be difficult to diagnose.

=== Hydraulic actuation ===
Hydraulically actuated suspensions are controlled with the use of hydraulics. The first example appeared in 1954, with the hydropneumatic suspension developed by Paul Magès at Citroën. The hydraulic pressure is supplied by a high pressure radial piston hydraulic pump. Sensors continually monitor body movement and vehicle ride level, constantly supplying the hydraulic height correctors with new data. In a matter of a few milliseconds, the suspension generates counter forces to raise or lower the body. During driving maneuvers, the encased nitrogen compresses instantly, offering six times the compressibility of the steel springs used by vehicles up to this time.

In practice, the system has always incorporated the desirable self-levelling suspension and height adjustable suspension features, with the latter now tied to vehicle speed for improved aerodynamic performance, as the vehicle lowers itself at high speed.

This system performed remarkably well in straight ahead driving, including over uneven surfaces, but had little control over roll stiffness.

Millions of production vehicles have been built with variations on this system.

=== Electronic actuation of hydraulic suspension ===
Colin Chapman developed the original concept of computer management of hydraulic suspension in the 1980s to improve cornering in racing cars. Lotus fitted and developed a prototype system to a 1985 Excel with electro-hydraulic active suspension, but never offered it for sale to the public, although many demonstration cars were built for other manufacturers.

Sensors continually monitor body movement and vehicle ride level, constantly supplying the computer with new data. As the computer receives and processes data, it operates the hydraulic servos, mounted beside each wheel. Almost instantly, the servo-regulated suspension generates counter forces to body lean, dive, and squat during driving maneuvers.

In 1990, Nissan installed a hydraulic supported MacPherson strut based setup, called Full-Active Suspension that was used in the Nissan Q45 and President. The system used a hydraulic oil pump, a hydraulic cylinder, an accumulator and damping valve, which connected two independent circuits for the front and rear strut assemblies. The system would then recover motion energy to balance the car continuously. The system was revised and is now called Hydraulic Body Motion Control System, installed on the Nissan Patrol and Infiniti QX80.

In 1991 Toyota introduced an active suspension system on a variant of the luxury coupe Toyota Soarer. This car used hydraulic struts and 4-wheel steering to provide a unique combination of handling and comfort with no body roll, as the system used numerous accelerometers to detect acceleration, cornering and braking forces and compensate in real-time by varying steering and suspension pressure individually to each wheel.

The car was however considerably more expensive than other variants of the model and as a result less than 900 cars of this type were sold throughout its 5-year production run.

Williams Grand Prix Engineering prepared an active suspension, devised by designer-aerodynamicist Frank Dernie, for the team's Formula 1 cars in 1992, creating such successful cars that the Fédération Internationale de l'Automobile decided to ban the technology to decrease the gap between Williams F1 team and its competitors.

Computer Active Technology Suspension (CATS) co-ordinates the best possible balance between ride quality and handling by analysing road conditions and making up to 3,000 adjustments every second to the suspension settings via electronically controlled dampers.

The 1999 Mercedes-Benz CL-Class (C215) introduced Active Body Control, where high pressure hydraulic servos are controlled by electronic computing, and this feature is still available. Vehicles can be designed to actively lean into curves to improve occupant comfort.

=== Active anti-roll bar ===
Active anti-roll bar stiffens under command of the driver or suspension electronic control unit (ECU) during hard cornering. The first production car with this technology was the Mitsubishi Mirage Cyborg in 1988.

=== Electromagnetic recuperative ===
In fully active electronically controlled production cars, the application of electric servos and motors married to electronic computing allows for flat cornering and instant reactions to road conditions.

The Bose Corporation has a proof of concept model. The founder of Bose, Amar Bose, had been working on exotic suspensions for many years while he was an MIT professor.

Electromagnetic active suspension uses linear electromagnetic motors attached to each wheel. It provides extremely fast response, and allows regeneration of power consumed, by using the motors as generators. This nearly surmounts the issues of slow response times and high power consumption of hydraulic systems. Electronically controlled active suspension system (ECASS) technology was patented by the University of Texas Center for Electromechanics in the 1990s and has been developed by L-3 Electronic Systems for use on military vehicles. The ECASS-equipped Humvee exceeded the performance specifications for all performance evaluations in terms of absorbed power to the vehicle operator, stability and handling.

=== Active Wheel ===
- Michelin's Active Wheel from 2004 incorporates an in-wheel electrical suspension motor that controls torque distribution, traction, turning maneuvers, pitch, roll and suspension damping for that wheel, in addition to an in-wheel electric traction motor.
- Audi active electromechanical suspension system introduced in 2017. It drives each wheel individually and adapts to the prevailing road conditions. Each wheel has an electric motor which is powered by the 48-volt main electrical system. Additional components include gears, a rotary tube together with internal titanium torsion bar and a lever which exerts up to 1,100 N⋅m (810 ft⋅lb) on the suspension via a coupling rod. Thanks to the front camera, the sedan detects bumps in the road early on and predictively adjusts the active suspension. Even before the car reaches a bump in the road, the preview function developed by Audi transmits the right amount of travel to the actuators and actively controls the suspension. The computer-controlled motors can sense imperfection on the road, and can raise the suspension up from the wheel which would go over the undulation, thus aiding the ride quality. The system will direct the motors on the outside to push up or pull down the suspension while cornering. This will result in a flatter drive and reduced body-roll around corners which in turn means more confident handling dynamics.

== Adaptive and semi-active ==
Adaptive or semi-active systems can only change the viscous damping coefficient of the shock absorber, and do not add energy to the suspension system. While adaptive suspensions have generally a slow time response and a limited number of damping coefficient values, semi-active suspensions have time response close to a few milliseconds and can provide a wide range of damping values. Therefore, adaptive suspensions usually only propose different riding modes (comfort, normal, sport...) corresponding to different damping coefficients, while semi-active suspensions modify the damping in real time, depending on the road conditions and the dynamics of the car. Though limited in their intervention (for example, the control force can never have different direction than the current vector of velocity of the suspension), semi-active suspensions are less expensive to design and consume far less energy. In recent times, research in semi-active suspensions has continued to advance with respect to their capabilities, narrowing the gap between semi-active and fully active suspension systems.

=== Solenoid/valve actuated ===
This type is the most economic and basic type of semi-active suspensions. They consist of a solenoid valve which alters the flow of the hydraulic medium inside the shock absorber, therefore changing the damping characteristics of the suspension setup. The solenoids are wired to the controlling computer, which sends them commands depending on the control algorithm (usually the so-called "Sky-Hook" technique).

This type of system is used in Cadillac's Computer Command Ride (CCR) suspension system. The first production car was the Toyota Soarer with semi-active Toyota Electronic Modulated Suspension, from 1983.

In 1985, Nissan introduced a shock absorber using a similar version, called "Super Sonic Suspension," adding an ultrasonic sensor that would provide information that a microcomputer would then interpret, combined with information from the steering, brakes, throttle, and vehicle speed sensor. The adjustment information signals would then modify the shock absorbers when a driver-controlled switch was placed in "Auto". The automatic adjustment could be limited if the switch was placed in "Soft," "Medium," or "Hard" settings. A modified version that didn't use the sonar module was also used, allowing the settings to be manually selected. This implementation is currently used industry-wide by a number of manufacturers, provided by Monroe Shock Absorbers called CVSAe, or Continuously Variable Semi-Active electronic.

In 2008, with the introduction of the Nissan GT-R, "DampTronic" was jointly developed by Nissan and Bilstein. DampTronic provides three selectable driver settings that can also interact with the Vehicle Dynamics Control technology to modify the transmission's shift points. The settings are labeled as Normal, Comfort, or R, and can be either set in Normal for automatic adjustment or the "R" setting for high-speed driving, while "Comfort" is for touring and a more compliant ride. The "R" mode enables the vehicle to utilize the yaw angle rate with a reduced steering angle for a crisper, more communicative steering, while the "Comfort" setting produces less vertical G-loading in comparison to the "Normal" or computer determined suspension setting.

=== Magnetorheological damper ===
Another method incorporates magnetorheological dampers with a brand name MagneRide. It was initially developed by Delphi Corporation for GM and was standard, as many other new technologies, for Cadillac STS (from model 2002), and on some other GM models from 2003. This was an upgrade for semi-active systems ("automatic road-sensing suspensions") used in upscale GM vehicles for decades. It allows, together with faster modern computers, changing the stiffness of all wheel suspensions independently. These dampers are finding increased usage in the US and already leases to some foreign brands, mostly in more expensive vehicles.

This system was in development for 25 years. The damper fluid contains metallic particles. Through the onboard computer, the dampers' compliance characteristics are controlled by an electromagnet. Essentially, increasing the current flow into the damper magnetic circuit increases the circuit magnetic flux. This in turn causes the metal particles to change their alignment, which increases fluid viscosity thereby raising the compression/rebound rates, while a decrease softens the effect of the dampers by aligning the particles in the opposite direction. If we imagine the metal particles as dinner plates then whilst aligned so they are on edge - viscosity is minimised. At the other end of the spectrum they will be aligned at 90 degrees so flat. Thus making the fluid much more viscous. It is the electric field produced by the electromagnet that changes the alignment of the metal particles. Information from wheel sensors (about suspension extension), steering, acceleration sensors - and other data, is used to calculate the optimal stiffness at that point in time. The fast reaction of the system (milliseconds) allows, for instance, making a softer passing by a single wheel over a bump in the road at a particular instant in time.

== Proactive and predictive ==
Input from sensors can be used to scan ahead of the vehicle and predict road conditions. These can then be used to proactively adjust the suspension to best suit these conditions.

== Production vehicles ==
By calendar year:

- 1954: Citroën Traction Avant 15-6H:, self-leveling Citroën hydropneumatic suspension on rear wheels.
- 1955: Citroën DS, self-leveling Citroën hydropneumatic suspension on all four wheels.
- 1957: Cadillac Eldorado Brougham: premiere of self-leveling GM air suspension
- 1967: Rolls-Royce Silver Shadow Partial load bearing hydropneumatic suspension on all four wheels. Front system deleted in 1969
- 1975: Mercedes Benz 450 SEL 6.9 Hydropneumatic suspension on all four wheels.
- 1983: Toyota Soarer: world first Electronically controlled (TEMS) that used a shock absorber control actuator (spring constant, variable attenuation force) installed
- 1985: Nissan introduced ultrasound semi-active suspension sensing "Super Sonic Suspension" optionally on the Cedric, Gloria and Nissan Laurel that integrated actuators inside the MacPherson struts on the front and rear suspension.
- 1986: Jaguar XJ40, self-leveling suspension.
- 1986: Mercedes Benz W126 Hydropneumatic suspension on all four wheels with electronically controlled adaptive damping as an option on the LWB v8 models
- 1987: Mitsubishi Galant (sixth generation) - features Active Controlled Suspension (Dynamic ECS). The system enables a comfortable ride and handling stability by automatically adjusting the vehicle height and damping force.
- 1989: Citroën XM - self-levelling, semi-active Hydractive on all four wheels with automatically adjusted spring rates and dampeners.
- 1989: Mercedes Benz R129 Partial load bearing hydropneumatic suspension with automatically adjusted spring rates and dampers as an option (ADS)
- 1990: Infiniti Q45 and Nissan President "Full-Active Suspension (FAS)", active suspension system
- 1990: Toyota Celica (ST183) Active Sports with fully Hydropneumatic active suspension and 4WS GT-R with Toyota Electronic Modulated Suspension (TEMS) semi-active suspension
- 1991: Toyota Soarer (UZZ32) Fully active computer-controlled Hydropneumatic suspension with 4WS
- 1992: Citroën Xantia VSX - self-levelling, semi-active Hydractive 2 on all four wheels, with automatically adjusted spring rates and dampeners.
- 1993: Cadillac, several models with RSS road sensing suspension. RSS was available in both standard and CVRSS (continuously variable road sensing suspension) systems. It monitored damping rates of the shock absorbers every 15 milliseconds, selecting between two settings.
- 1994: Toyota Celsior introduced first Skyhook air suspension
- 1994: Citroën Xantia Activa - self-levelling, fully active Hydractive on all four wheels with hydraulic anti-roll bars and automatically adjusted spring rates and dampeners.
- 1998: Land Rover Discovery series 2 - Active Cornering Enhancement; an electronically controlled hydraulic anti-roll bar system was fitted to some versions, which reduced cornering roll.
- 1999: Mercedes Benz C215 Self leveling fully active hydraulic Active body control. Available on the S, CL and SL models
- 2000 Citroen C5 Hydractive 3 or Hydractive 3+
- 2002: Cadillac Seville STS, first MagneRide
- 2004: Volvo S60 R and V70 R (Four-C, a short name for "Continuously Controlled Chassis Concept", semi-active)
- 2006 Citroen C6 - Hydractive 3+
- 2010: Alfa Romeo MiTo Cloverleaf (DNA System based on Maserati's Skyhook technology)
- 2012: Jaguar XF Sportbrake, self-leveling air suspension.
- 2013: Mercedes Benz W222: Optional Magic body control. Self leveling fully active hydraulic system with road surface scanning electronics
- 2013: Volkswagen Mk7 Golf R User-Selectable Electronically Controlled Shock Dampening (Dynamic Chassis Control (DCC))
- 2019: Toyota Avalon Touring model (Adaptive Variable Suspension (AVS))
- 2023: Ferrari Purosangue
- 2025: Nio ET9 (SkyRide fully active suspension)
- 2025: Lincoln, as of 2025 all vehicles from Lincoln Motor Company offer active suspension.
- 2025: Ferrari F80

== See also ==
- Toyota Active Control Suspension
- Hydropneumatic suspension
- Active Body control
