= Active Body Control =

Type of automobile suspension technology

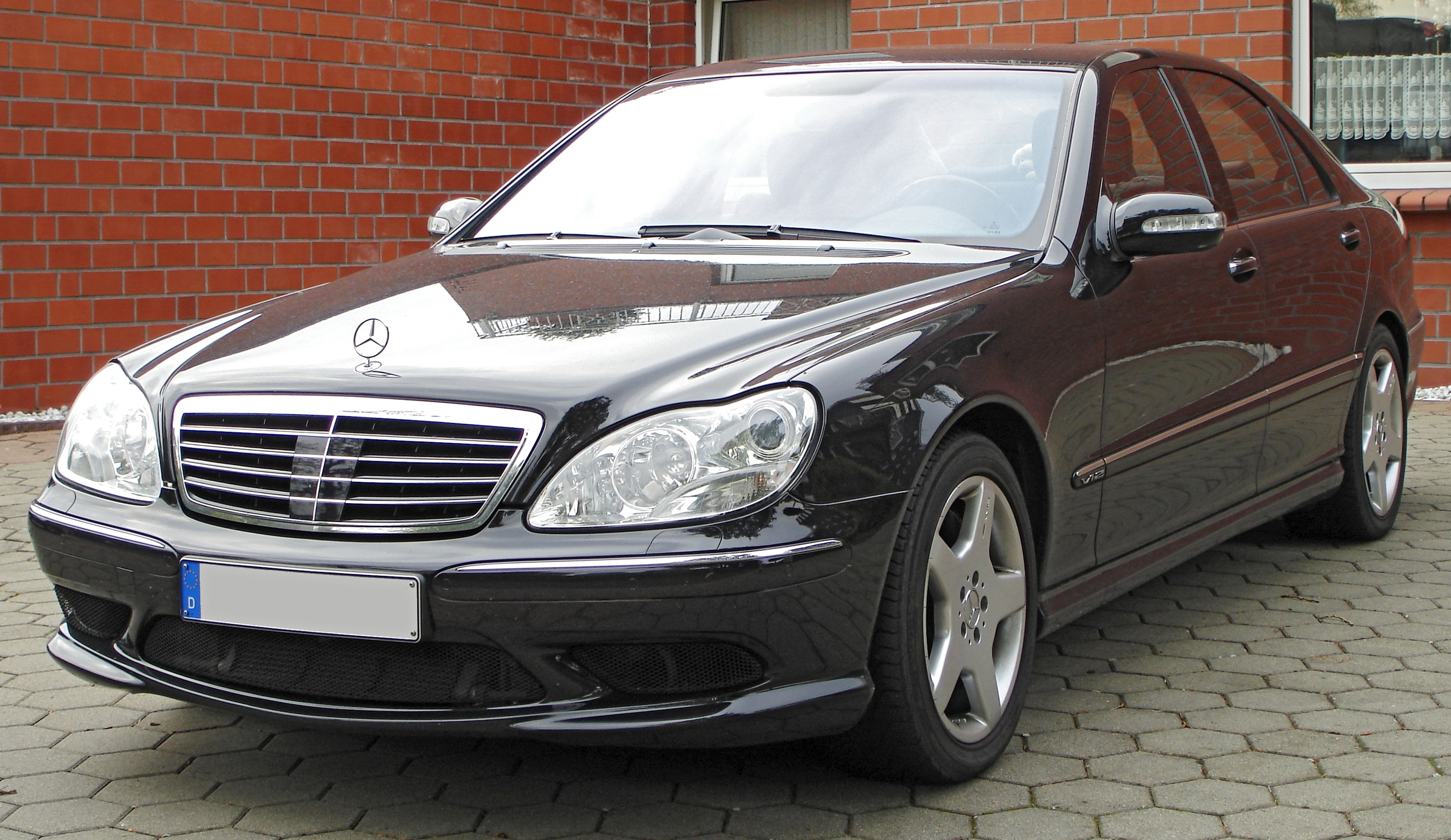
Mercedes-Benz S-Class (W220)

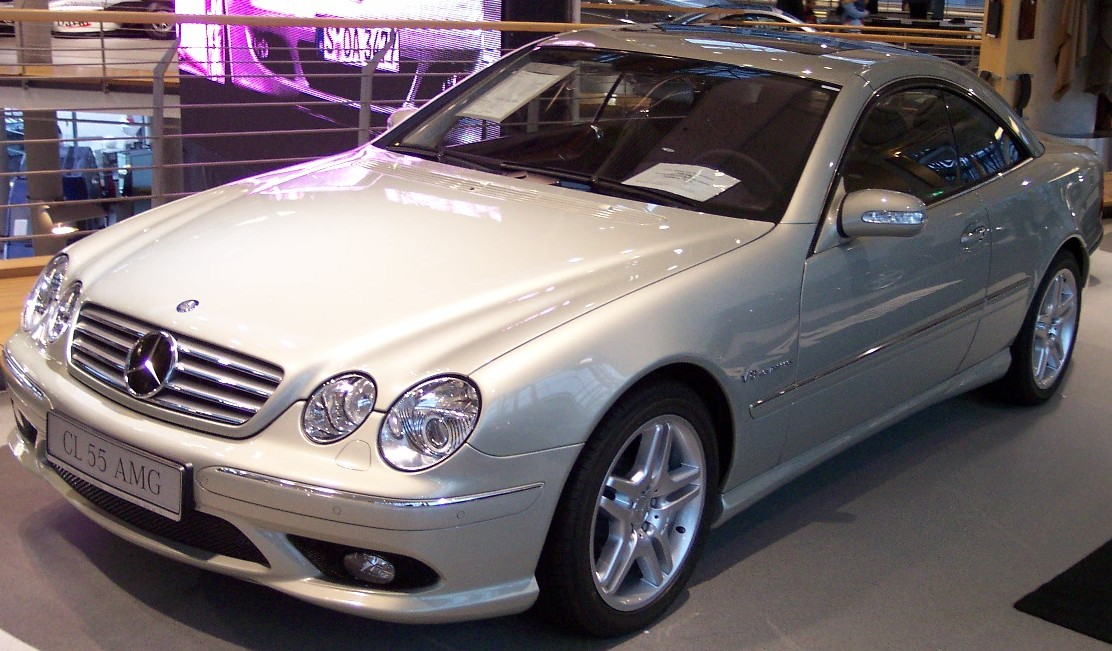
Mercedes-Benz CL-Class C215

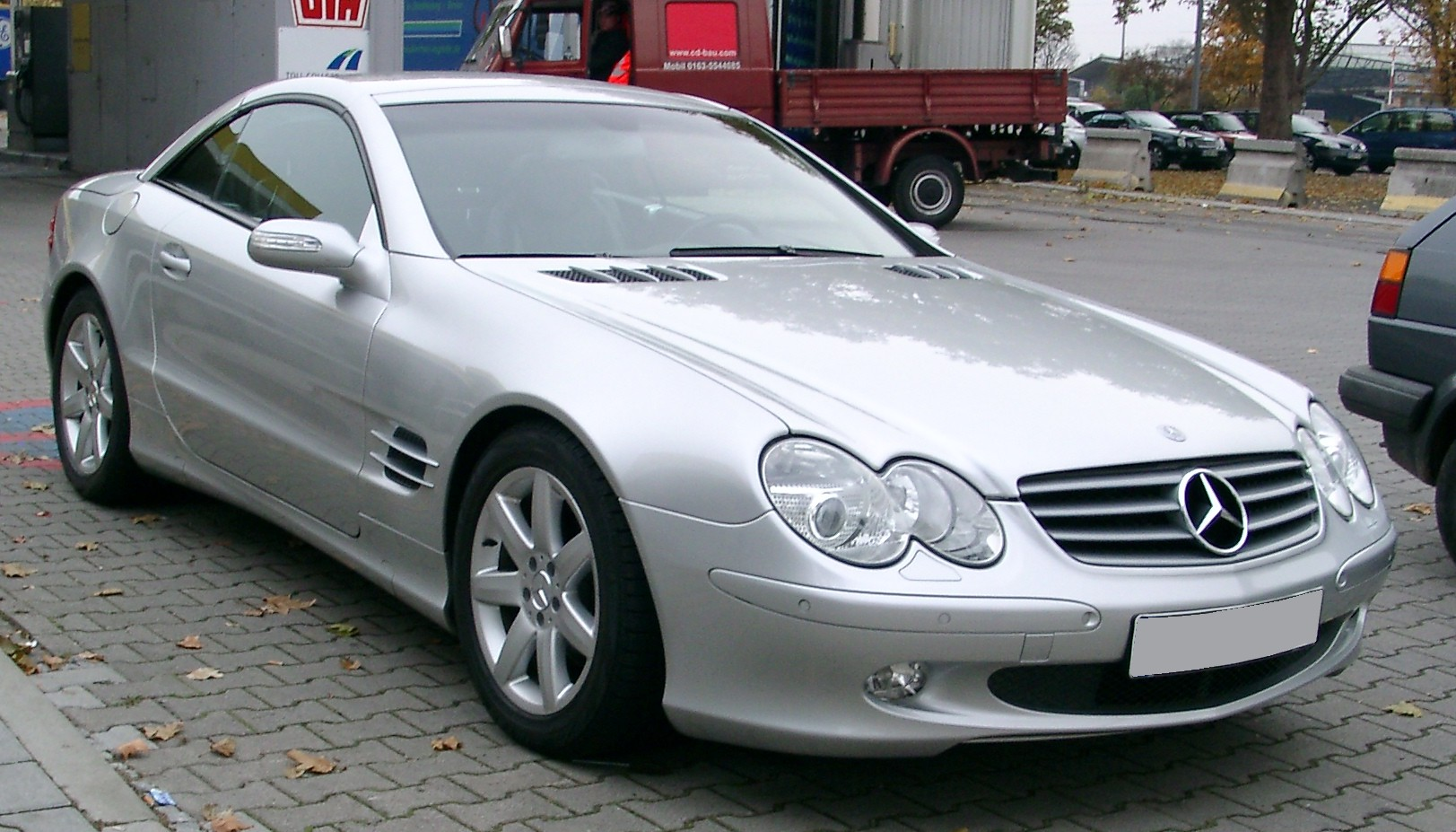
Mercedes-Benz SL Class

Active Body Control, or ABC, is the Mercedes-Benz brand name used to describe electronically controlled hydropneumatic suspension.

This suspension improves ride quality and allows for control of the vehicle body motions, reducing body roll in many driving situations, including cornering, accelerating, and braking.

Mercedes-Benz has been experimenting with these capabilities for automobile suspension since the air suspension of the 1963 600 and the hydropneumatic (fluid and air) suspension of the 1974 6.9.

ABC was only offered on rear-wheel drive models, as all-wheel drive 4MATIC models were available only with Airmatic semi-active air suspension, with the 2019 Mercedes-Benz GLE 450 4MATIC being the first AWD to have ABC available.

The production version was introduced at the 1999 Geneva Motor Show on the new Mercedes-Benz CL-Class C215.

== Description ==
In the ABC system, a computer detects body movement from sensors located throughout the vehicle, and controls the action of the active suspension with the use of hydraulic servomechanisms. The hydraulic pressure to the servos is supplied by a high-pressure radial piston hydraulic pump, operating at 3,000psi. Accumulators regulate the hydraulic pressure by means of an enclosed nitrogen bubble separated from the hydraulic fluid by a membrane.

A total of 13 sensors continually monitor body movement and vehicle level and supply the ABC controller with new data every ten milliseconds. Four level sensors, one at each wheel measure the ride level of the vehicle, three accelerometers measure the vertical body acceleration, one acceleration sensor measures the longitudinal and one sensor the transverse body acceleration. As the ABC controller receives and processes data, it operates four hydraulic servos, each mounted on an air and pressurized hydraulic fluid strut, beside each wheel.

Almost instantaneously, the servo-regulated suspension generates counter forces to body lean, dive and squat during various driving manoeuvres. A suspension strut, consisting of a steel coil spring and a shock absorber connected in parallel, as well as a hydraulically controlled adjusting cylinder, is located between the vehicle body and wheel. These components adjust the cylinder in the direction of the suspension strut, and change the suspension length. This creates a force which acts on the suspension and damping of the vehicle in the frequency range up to five hertz.

The system also incorporates height adjustable suspension, which in this case lowers the vehicle up to 11 mm (0.43 in) between the speeds of 60–160 km/h (37–99 mph) for better aerodynamics, fuel consumption, and handling.

The ABC system also allows self-levelling suspension, which raises or lowers the vehicle in response to changing load (i.e. the loading or unloading of passengers or cargo). Each vehicle equipped with ABC has an “ABC Sport” button that allows the driver to adjust the suspension range for different driving style preferences. This feature allows the driver to adjust the suspension to maintain a more level ride in more demanding driving conditions.

The reliable function of the ABC system requires a regular hydraulic oil change and filter replacement.

The 1991 Mercedes-Benz C112, 1995 Mercedes-Benz Vario Research Car and the 1996 Mercedes-Benz F200 already featured prototype versions of ABC.

The first complete and ready-for-production version of ABC was introduced in 1999 on the top-of-the-line Mercedes-Benz CL-Class (C215).

In 2006, the Mercedes-Benz CL-Class (C216) introduced the second generation Active Body Control suspension, referred to as ABC Plus or ABC II in technical documentation. This updated suspension reduced body roll by 45% compared to the first-generation ABC suspension. ABC Plus had an updated hydraulic system design, with shorter hydraulic lines, and the pulsation damper was relocated to be mounted directly on the tandem pump.

In 2010, a crosswind stabilization function was introduced. In strong gusts of crosswind, and depending on the direction and intensity of the wind having an effect on the vehicle, this system varies the wheel load distribution in such a way that the effects of winds are largely compensated or reduced to a minimum. For this purpose the ABC control unit uses the yaw rate, lateral acceleration, steering angle and road speed sensors of the Electronic Stability Program ESP®.

== Magic Body Control ==
In 2007, the Mercedes-Benz F700 concept introduced the PRE-SCAN suspension, an early prototype road scanning suspension, using lidar sensors, based on Active Body Control.

In 2013, the Mercedes-Benz S-Class (W222) introduced the series production version of PRE-SCAN, but with a stereo camera instead of laser projectors. The system dubbed Magic Body Control is fitted with a road-sensing system (Road Surface Scan) that pre-loads the shocks for the road surface detected. Using a stereo camera, the system scans the road surface up to 15 meters ahead of the vehicle at speeds up to 130 km/h (81 mph), and it adjusts the shock damping at each wheel to account for imperfections in the road. Initially only available on 8-cylinder models and above, Magic Ride Control attempts to isolate the car's body by predicting rather than reacting to broken pavement and speed humps. The ABC has undergone major modifications for the new S-Class: the wheel damping is now continuously adjustable, the spring strut response has been improved and the pump efficiency has been further enhanced. A digital interface connects the control unit and the sensors, while the fast FlexRay bus connects the control unit and the vehicle electronics. Processing power is more than double that of the previous system.

In 2014 the new C217 S-Class Coupe introduced an update to Magic Body Control, called Active Curve Tilting. This new system allows the vehicle to lean up to 2.5 degrees into a turn, similar to a tilting train. The leaning is intended to counter the effect of centrifugal force on the occupants and is available only on rear-wheel drive models

== E-Active Body Control ==
In 2019 Mercedes-Benz introduced a new generation of its active suspension system called E-Active Body Control (also written EABC), debuting on the fourth-generation Mercedes-Benz GLE (V167).

E-Active Body Control combines the air-spring elements of the AIRMATIC suspension with a 48-volt electrohydraulic system that actively controls spring and damping forces individually at each wheel. Unlike earlier ABC systems, which counteracted body roll and pitch primarily through high-pressure hydraulics, E-Active Body Control can also manage wheel-specific vertical movement to improve ride comfort and off-road capability.

Using a network of sensors, cameras, and the onboard control unit, the system scans the road ahead and prepares each wheel for uneven surfaces. This predictive function, derived from the earlier Magic Body Control camera-based system, further refines comfort by pre-adjusting damping forces.

The 48-volt network allows greater hydraulic response and energy recovery, enabling features such as “Free Driving Assist,” which lets the vehicle rock itself free when stuck in sand or snow. The system was first offered on the Mercedes-Benz GLE and Mercedes-Benz GLS and later extended to the Mercedes-Benz S-Class (W223).

E-Active Body Control represents the evolution of Mercedes-Benz’s fully active suspension systems, integrating air suspension, hydraulics, and real-time predictive control under a single electronic architecture.

== Vehicles ==
Vehicles, chronological order:

- Mercedes-Benz C112
- Mercedes-Benz Vario Research Car
- Mercedes-Benz F200
- Mercedes-Benz CL-Class C215
- Mercedes-Benz S-Class (W220), standard on S600 and S65 AMG, optional on other trims
- Mercedes-Benz SL Class R230
- Mercedes-Benz S-Class (W221)
- Mercedes-Benz CL-Class (C216)
- Mercedes-Benz SL Class R231
- Mercedes-Benz S-Class (W222): Magic Body Control
- Mercedes-Benz S-Class (C217): Magic Body Control
- Mercedes-Benz GLE (C167): E-Active Body Control
- Mercedes-Benz GLS (X167): E-Active Body Control
- Mercedes-Benz S-Class (W223): E-Active Body Control

== Timeline of active suspension development ==
- 1955 Citroën DS had hydropneumatic suspension designed by Paul Magès - the first car with height adjustable suspension and self-levelling suspension; leveraging the fact that gas/air absorbs force, while fluid transfers force smoothly
- 1962 Mercedes-Benz W112 platform featured an air suspension on the 300SE model and the 1963 Mercedes-Benz 600 model
- 1965 Rolls-Royce Silver Shadow licensed technology from the Citroën DS: hydropneumatic suspension offering self-levelling
- 1974 Maserati Quattroporte II used the height adjustable suspension and self-levelling suspension from the Citroën SM
- 1975 Mercedes-Benz 450SEL 6.9 with fully Hydropneumatic suspension similar in technology, but not geometry, to Citroën design
- 1979 Mercedes-Benz W126 then new S class had even more sophisticated height adjustable suspension and self-levelling suspension.
- 1984 Mercedes-Benz W124 selected models of E class had this technology (rear only hydraulic suspension) height adjustable suspension and self-levelling suspension.
- 1985 Bose Corporation founder and CEO Dr. Amar Bose Designed a suspension that mixed passenger comfort and vehicle control, this system used linear electromagnetic motors, power amplifiers, control algorithms and computation speed.
- Early-1980s through early '90s, Lotus Engineering, the consultant branch of Lotus Cars, experimented with active suspension layouts, combining Electrohydraulic servo valve technology from aerospace, a variety of sensors and both analog and digital controllers. About 100 prototype cars and trucks (and several racing cars) were built for a wide variety of customers, with variants of the high-bandwidth Lotus Active system.
- 1986-Lotus Engineering and Moog Inc. formed joint venture Moog-Lotus Systems Inc. to commercialize the Lotus technology with electro-hydraulic servo valves designed by Moog. The joint venture was later purchased by the TRW Steering and Suspension Division.
- 1989 Citroën XM had a similar electronic control of hydraulic suspension, branded Hydractive.
- 1989 Toyota Celica with Toyota Active Control Suspension
- 1991 Infiniti Q45 was optionally equipped with "Full Active Suspension", a world-first in production automobiles.
- 1991 Toyota Soarer had a fully active hydraulic suspension system on the 1991 UZZ32 model:Toyota Active Control Suspension.
- 1994 Citroën Xantia ACTIVA variant introduced active anti-roll bars as an extension to their Hydractive II suspension.
- 1999 Mercedes-Benz CL-Class C215 introduces Active Body Control.
- 2023 BYD Auto introduces "DiSus" hydropneumatic suspension on the Yangwang U8 SUV and U9 sportscar. The suspension features the ability to drive with only three wheels fitted, and jump in the air while parked remaining level.
