= Hydropneumatic suspension =

Type of motor vehicle suspension system

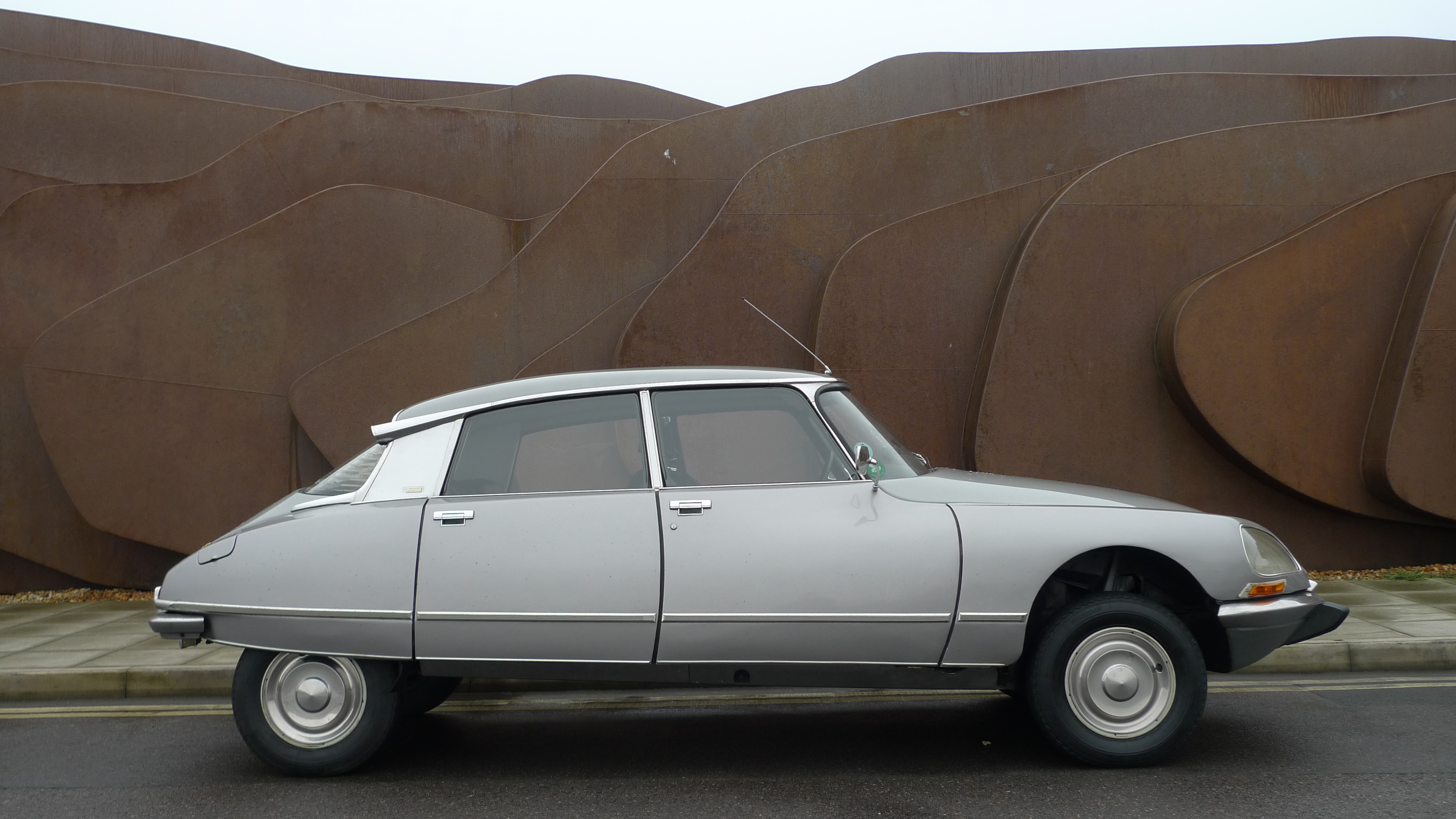
High position

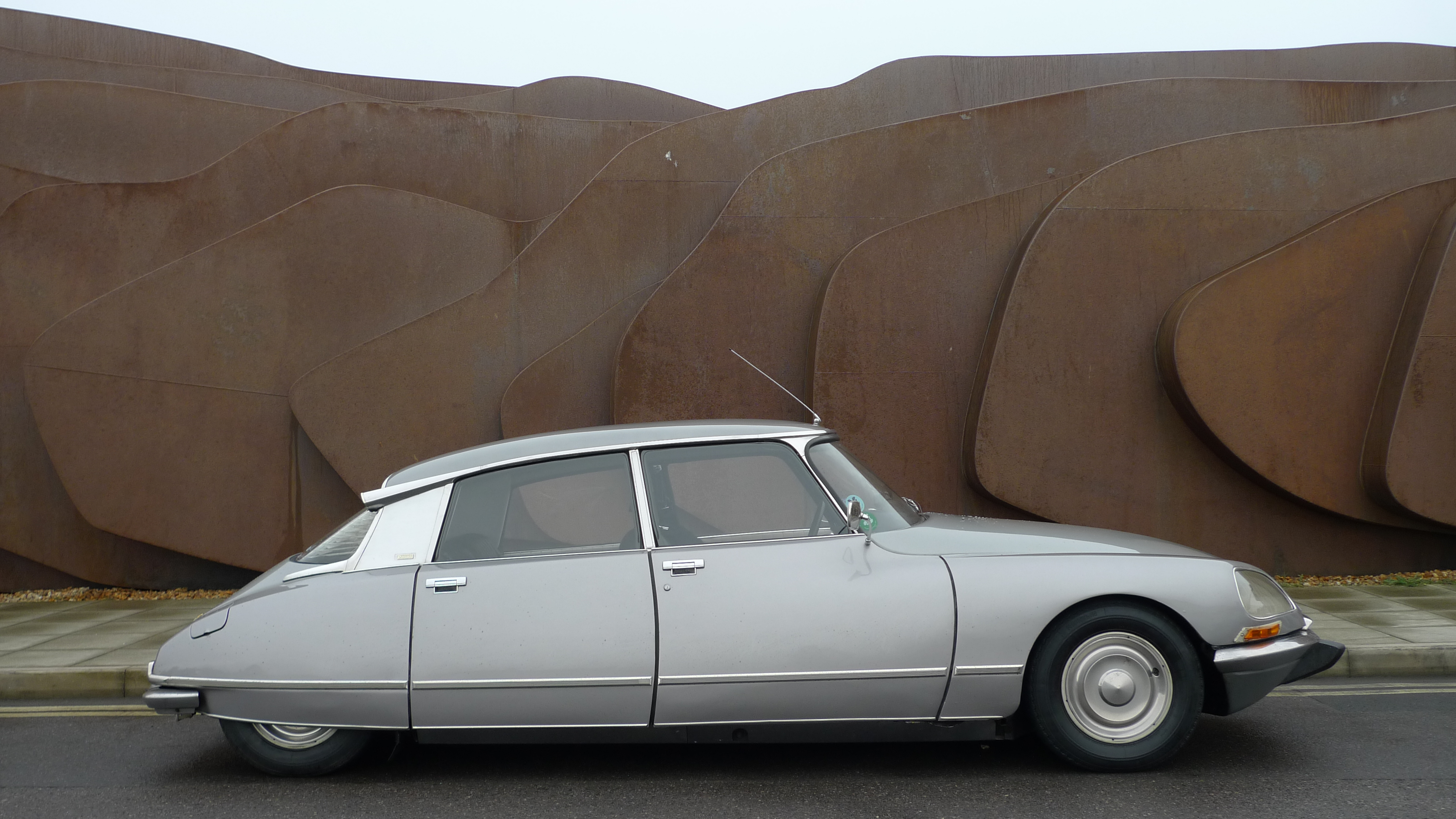
Low position

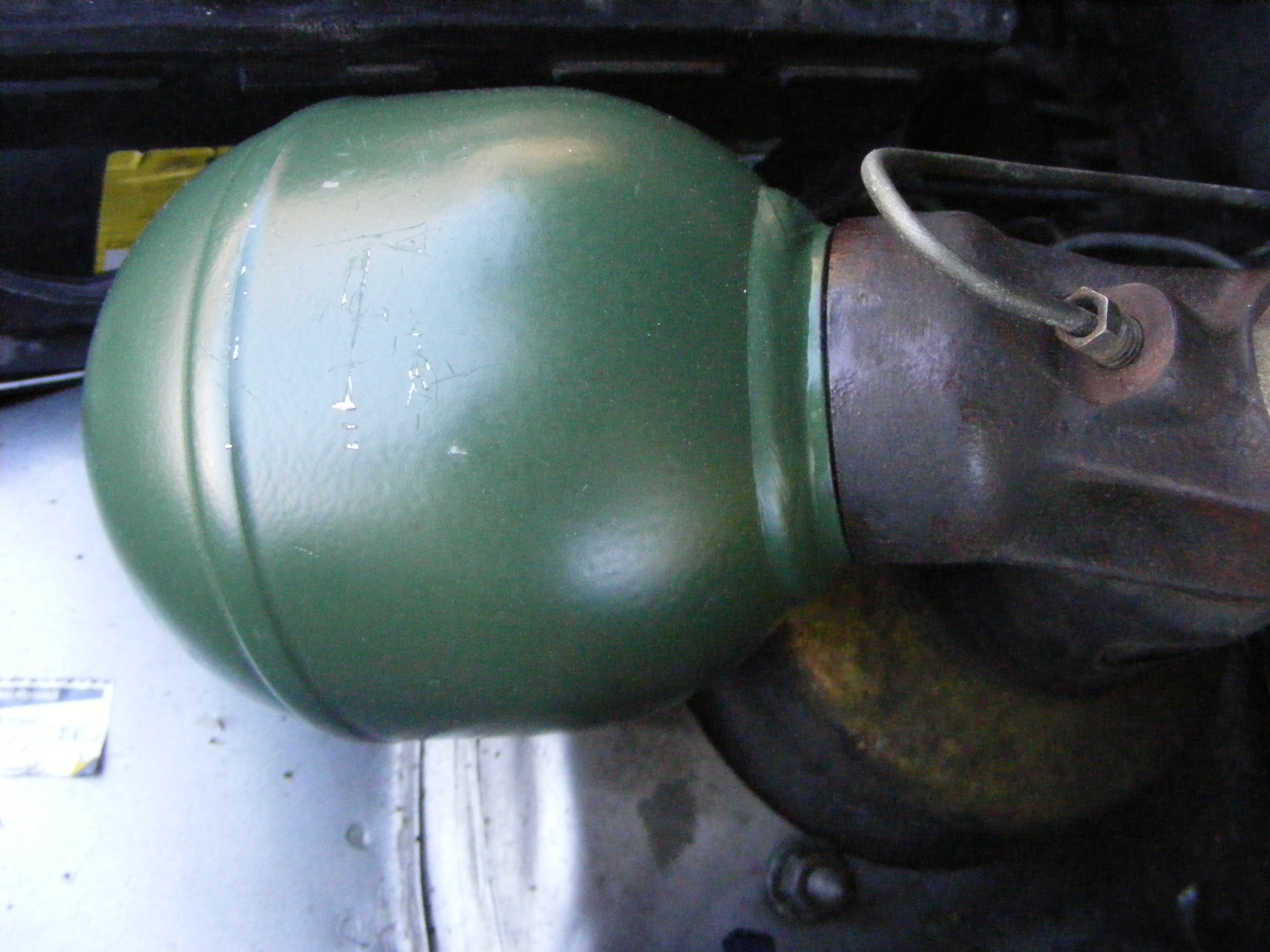
Citroën suspension sphere

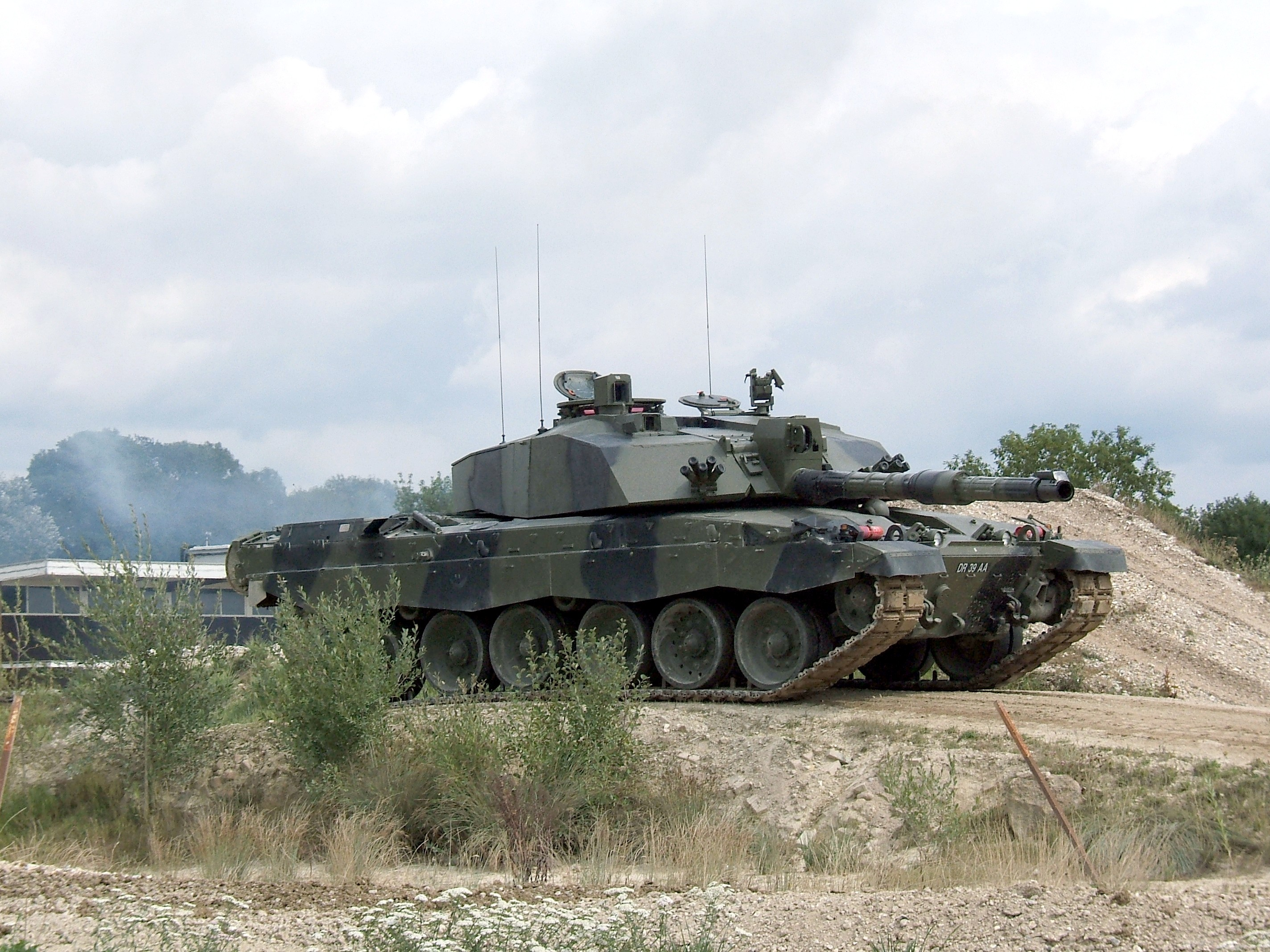
Challenger 2, main battle tank of the British army, uses hydropneumatic suspension for better crew comfort and increased firing accuracy.

Hydropneumatic suspension is a type of motor vehicle suspension system, invented by Paul Magès, produced by Citroën, and fitted to Citroën cars, as well as being used under licence by other car manufacturers. Similar systems are also widely used on modern tanks and other large military vehicles. The suspension was referred to as Suspension oléopneumatique in early literature, pointing to oil and air as its main components.

The purpose of this system is to provide a sensitive, dynamic and high-capacity suspension that offers superior ride quality on a variety of surfaces. A hydropneumatic system combines the advantages of hydraulic systems and pneumatic systems so that gas absorbs excessive force and liquid in hydraulics directly transfers force. The suspension system usually features both self-leveling and driver-variable ride height, to provide extra clearance in rough terrain.

This type of suspension for automobiles was inspired by the pneumatic suspension used for aircraft landing gear, which was also partly filled with oil for lubrication and to prevent gas leakage, as patented in 1933 by the same company. The principles illustrated by the successful use of hydropneumatic suspension are now used in a broad range of applications, such as aircraft oleo struts and gas-filled automobile shock absorbers.

== Description ==
Hydropneumatic suspension is a type of motor vehicle suspension system, invented by Paul Magès, produced by Citroën, and fitted to Citroën cars. The suspension was referred to as Suspension oléopneumatique in early literature, pointing to oil and air as its main components.

Elements of the system were also used under licence by other car manufacturers, notably Rolls-Royce (Silver Shadow), BMW 5 Series (E34) Touring, Maserati (Quattroporte II) and Peugeot. It was also used on Berliet trucks and has been used on Mercedes-Benz cars, where it is known as Active Body Control. The Toyota Soarer UZZ32 "Limited" was fitted with a fully integrated four-wheel steering and a complex, computer-controlled hydraulic Toyota Active Control Suspension in 1991. Similar systems are also widely used on modern tanks and other large military vehicles.

== Effects ==
The purpose of this system is to provide a sensitive, dynamic and high-capacity suspension that offers superior ride quality on a variety of surfaces. The suspension system usually features both self-leveling and driver-variable ride height, to provide extra clearance in rough terrain. Hydropneumatic suspension has a number of natural advantages over steel springs, generally recognized in the auto industry. In a hydropneumatic system, gas absorbs excessive force, whereas liquid in hydraulics directly transfers force, which combines the advantages of two technological principles:

- Hydraulic systems use torque multiplication in an easy way, independent of the distance between the input and output, without the need for mechanical gears or levers.
- Pneumatic systems are based on the fact that gas is compressible, so equipment is less subject to shock damage.

Suspension and springing technology is not generally well understood by consumers, leading to a public perception that hydropneumatics are merely "good for comfort". They also have advantages related to handling and control efficiency, solving a number of problems inherent in steel springs that suspension designers have previously struggled to eliminate. Although auto manufacturers understood the inherent advantages over steel springs, there were two problems. First, it was patented by the inventor, and second, it had a perceived element of complexity, so automakers like Mercedes-Benz, British Leyland (Hydrolastic, Hydragas), and Lincoln sought to create simpler variants using a compressed air suspension.

Citroën's application of the system had the disadvantage that only garages equipped with special tools and knowledge were qualified to work on the cars, making them radically different from ordinary cars with common mechanicals. France was noted for the poor quality of its roads after World War II, but the hydropneumatic suspension as fitted to the Citroën ID/DS and later cars reportedly ensured a smooth and stable ride there.

Hydropneumatic suspension offers no natural roll stiffness. There have been many improvements to the system over the years, including steel anti-roll bars, variable ride firmness (Hydractive), and active control of body roll (Citroën Activa).

== Basic mechanical layout ==
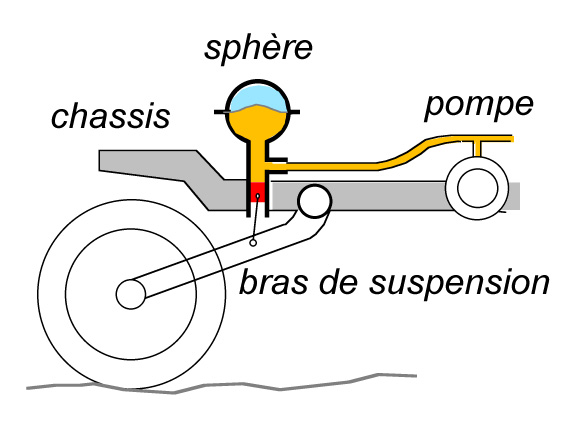
Blue: nitrogen gas; gold: hydraulic fluid under pressure from the engine-driven pump

This system uses a belt- or camshaft-driven pump from the engine to pressurise a special hydraulic fluid, which then powers the brakes, suspension and power steering. It can also power any number of features such as the clutch, turning headlamps and even power windows.

Nitrogen is used as the trapped gas to be compressed, since it is unlikely to cause corrosion. The actuation of the nitrogen spring reservoir is performed through an incompressible hydraulic fluid inside a suspension cylinder. By adjusting the filled fluid volume within the cylinder, a leveling functionality is implemented. The nitrogen gas within the suspension sphere is separated from the hydraulic oil by a rubber membrane.

== History ==
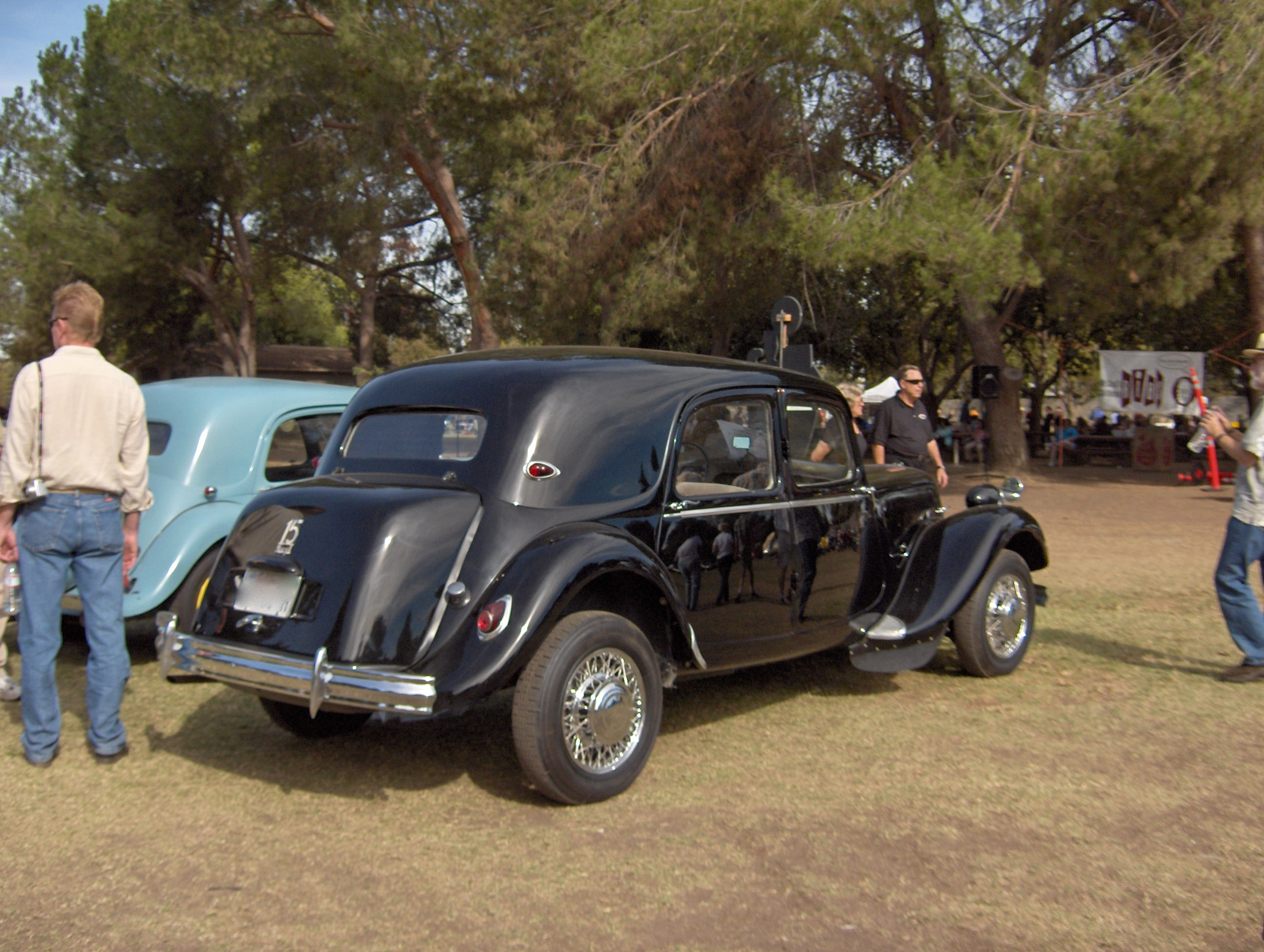
1954 Citroën Traction Avant 15CVH – high position

Citroën first introduced this system in 1954 on the rear suspension of the Traction Avant. The first four-wheel implementation was in the advanced DS in 1955. This type of suspension for automobiles was inspired by the pneumatic suspension used for aircraft landing gear, which was also partly filled with oil for lubrication and to prevent gas leakage, as patented in 1933 by the same company. Other modifications followed, with design changes such as the 1960 "double stage oleo-pneumatic shock absorber" patented by Peter Fullam John and Stephan Gyurik.

Major milestones of the hydropneumatics design were:

- During World War II, Paul Magès, an employee of Citroën, with no formal training in engineering, secretly develops the concept of an oil and air suspension to combine a new level of softness with vehicle control and self-levelling.
- 1954 Traction Avant 15H: Rear suspension, using LHS hydraulic fluid.
- 1955 Citroën DS: Suspension, power steering, brakes and gearbox/clutch assembly powered by high pressure hydraulic assistance. A belt-driven seven-piston pump, similar in size to a power steering pump, generates this pressure when the engine is running.
- 1960 The United States Patent and Trademark Office issues U.S. patent 2959410A for a double stage oleo-pneumatic shock absorber using concepts very similar to those developed earlier by Paul Magès – Patent forms the basis for aircraft oleo struts and gas-filled shock absorbers
- 1965 Rolls-Royce licenses Citroën technology for the suspension of the new Silver Shadow
- 1967 The superior non-hygroscopic LHM mineral fluid is introduced
- 1969 Citroën M35: The Citroën M35 was a coupé derived from the Ami 8, and equipped with a Wankel engine and a hydropneumatic suspension. The bodies were produced by Heuliez from 1969 to 1971.
- 1969 National Highway Traffic Safety Administration legalizes LHM mineral fluid in the United States
- 1970 Citroën GS: Adaptation of the hydropneumatic suspension to a small car
- 1970 Citroën SM: Variable speed auto-returning power steering, dubbed DIRAVI, and hydraulically actuated directional high beams. The beams of all six headlights are maintained parallel to the road surface by a hydraulic system separate from the directional long range high beams. The headlights' steering and leveling systems are totally separate from the central system that powers the suspension, steering and brakes and use a different fluid, a glycerine type.
- 1972 BMW E12 5-series released with optional hydropneumatic rear suspension. Coil springs are retained, though softer than conventional coils for the same car. This system was offered in most BMW 5-, 6-, and 7-series models, as well as the E30 Touring (station wagon/estate), into the 1990s when it was replaced with an air suspension. Until late 1987, the hydraulic circuit was separate from the power steering, and the pump electrically powered.
- 1974 National Highway Traffic Safety Administration bans vehicles with height adjustable suspension, impacting consumers in the United States. Ban repealed 1981.
- 1974 Citroën CX: The car was one of the most modern of its time, combining Citroën's unique hydro-pneumatic integral self-leveling suspension and speed-adjustable DIRAVI power steering (first introduced on the Citroën SM). The suspension was attached to sub frames that were fitted to the body through flexible mountings, to improve even more the ride quality and to reduce road noise. The British magazine Car described the sensation of driving a CX as hovering over road irregularities, much like a ship traversing above the ocean floor.
- 1974 Maserati Quattroporte II: was on an extended Citroën SM chassis, available since Citroën had purchased the Italian company and was the only Maserati Quattroporte to feature hydropneumatic suspension and front-wheel drive
- 1975 The Mercedes-Benz 450SEL 6.9 W116 replaces the air suspension of the 6.3 with hydropneumatic suspension, with the pump driven by the engine's timing chain instead of an external belt. This adaptation was used only for the suspension. Power steering and brakes were conventional hydraulic- and vacuum-powered, respectively.
- 1980 Mercedes-Benz W126 500SEL used hydropneumatic suspension as optional, later this system was available on 420SEL and 560SEL models.
- 1983 Citroën BX, built as a 4WD in 1990
- 1984 Mercedes-Benz W124 selected models of E class had this technology (rear only hydraulic suspension) height adjustable suspension and self-levelling suspension mixed with coil springs.
- 1987 BMW E30 3-series Touring (station wagon/estate) begins production in July, offering the same self-leveling hydropneumatic rear suspension as previous BMW, with the difference that the pump is a parallel circuit on the belt-driven steering assist pump, and shares its fluid. Starting in September, the E32 7-series (in production since June '86) switches to this pump from the previous electric pump. The BMW E34 5-series begins production in November, also with this new pump.
- 1989 Citroën XM: Hydractive Suspension, electronic regulation of the hydropneumatic system; sensors measure acceleration and other factors
- 1990 Peugeot 405 Mi16x4: first Peugeot equipped with rear hydropneumatic suspension
- 1990 JCB Fastrac high speed agricultural tractor uses this system for its rear suspension.
- 1991 Toyota Soarer UZZ32 used hydraulic struts controlled by an array of sensors with yaw velocity sensors, vertical G sensors, height sensors, wheel speed sensors, longitudinal and lateral G sensors) that detected cornering, acceleration and braking force.
- 1993 Citroën Xantia used hydropneumatic, on 1995 Optional Activa (active suspension) system, eliminating body roll by acting on anti-roll bars. A Xantia Activa was able to reach more than 1g lateral acceleration, and still holds the record speed (85 km/h (53 mph)) through the moose test maneuver, due to its active anti-roll bars. This test is conducted by the magazine Teknikens Värld's, as a test of avoiding a moose in the road. The second place car, Porsche 997 GT3 RS was able to manage 82 km/h (51 mph).
- 1995 Mercedes-Benz E-Class (W210) on estate (wagon) models on rear suspension used hydraulic suspension with spheres height adjustable suspension and self-levelling suspension mixed with coil springs.
- 1999 Mercedes-Benz CL-Class (C215) and Mercedes-Benz S-Class (W220) introduce optional Active Body Control – an electronically controlled hydropneumatic system
- 2001 Citroën C5: Hydractive 3 removes the need for central hydraulic pressure generation; combined pump/sphere unit for the suspension only and with electric height adjustment sensors. Hydractive 3+ was available on some models
- 2005 Citroën C6: An improved version of the C5 system known as Hydractive 3+ (also fitted to some C5 models), C6 with a V6 engine was fitted with AMVAR version of Hydractive 3+ (sometimes called Hydractive 4)
- 2007 Citroën C5 II: Hydractive 3+ as optional on Exclusive models. other versions of the car have normal spring suspension.
- 2008 JCB Fastrac high speed 7000 series agricultural tractors now use this system for front and rear suspension.
- 2019 Mercedes-Benz 450 GLE introduces eActive Body Control on a Sport utility vehicle, discarding mechanical roll bars, notably enhancing performance.
- 2023 BYD Auto introduces advanced active hydropneumatic suspension systems on the Yangwang U8 SUV and U9 sportscar. The suspension features the ability to drive with only three wheels fitted, and jump in the air while parked remaining level.

== Functioning ==
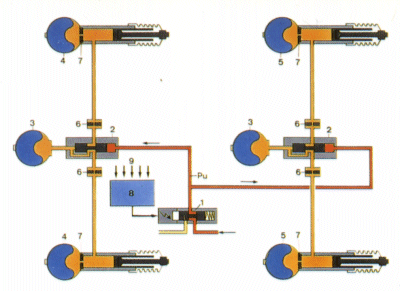
Diagram of the Hydractive system, showing centre spheres and stiffness valves

At the heart of the system, acting as pressure sink as well as suspension elements, are the so-called spheres, five or six in all; one per wheel and one main accumulator as well as a dedicated brake accumulator on some models. On later cars fitted with Hydractive or Activa suspension, there may be as many as ten spheres. Spheres consist of a hollow metal ball, open to the bottom, with a flexible Desmopan rubber membrane, fixed at the 'equator' inside, separating top and bottom. The top is filled with nitrogen at high pressure, up to 75 bar; the bottom connects to the car's hydraulic fluid circuit. The high pressure pump, powered by the engine, pressurizes the hydraulic fluid (LHM – liquide hydraulique minéral) and an accumulator sphere maintains a reserve of hydraulic power. This part of the circuit is at between 150 and 180 bars. It powers the front brakes first, prioritised via a security valve, and depending on type of vehicle, can power the steering, clutch, gear selector, etc.

Pressure flows from the hydraulic circuit to the suspension cylinders, pressurizing the bottom part of the spheres and suspension cylinders. Suspension works by means of a piston forcing LHM into the sphere, compressing the nitrogen in the upper part of the sphere; damping is provided by a two-way 'leaf valve' in the opening of the sphere. LHM has to squeeze back and forth through this valve which causes resistance and controls the suspension movements. It is the simplest damper and one of the most efficient. Ride height correction (self leveling) is achieved by height corrector valves connected to the anti-roll bar, front and rear. When the car is too low, the height corrector valve opens to allow more fluid into the suspension cylinder (e.g., the car is loaded). When the car is too high (e.g. after unloading) fluid is returned to the system reservoir via low-pressure return lines. Height correctors act with some delay in order not to correct regular suspension movements. The rear brakes are powered from the rear suspension circuit. Because the pressure there is proportional to the load, so is the braking power.

== Working fluid ==
Citroën quickly realized that standard brake fluid was not ideally suited to high-pressure hydraulics, and developed a special red-coloured hydraulic fluid named Liquide Hydraulique Synthétique (LHS), which they used from 1954 to 1967. The chief problem with LHS was that it absorbed moisture and dust from the air, which caused corrosion in the system. Most hydraulic brake systems are sealed from the outside air by a rubber diaphragm in the reservoir filler cap, but the Citroën system had to be vented to allow the fluid level in the reservoir to rise and fall, thus it was not hermetically sealed. Consequently, each time the suspension would rise, the fluid level in the reservoir dropped, drawing in fresh moisture-laden air. The large surface of the fluid in the reservoir readily absorbed moisture. Since the system recirculates fluid continually through the reservoir, all the fluid was repeatedly exposed to the air and its moisture content.

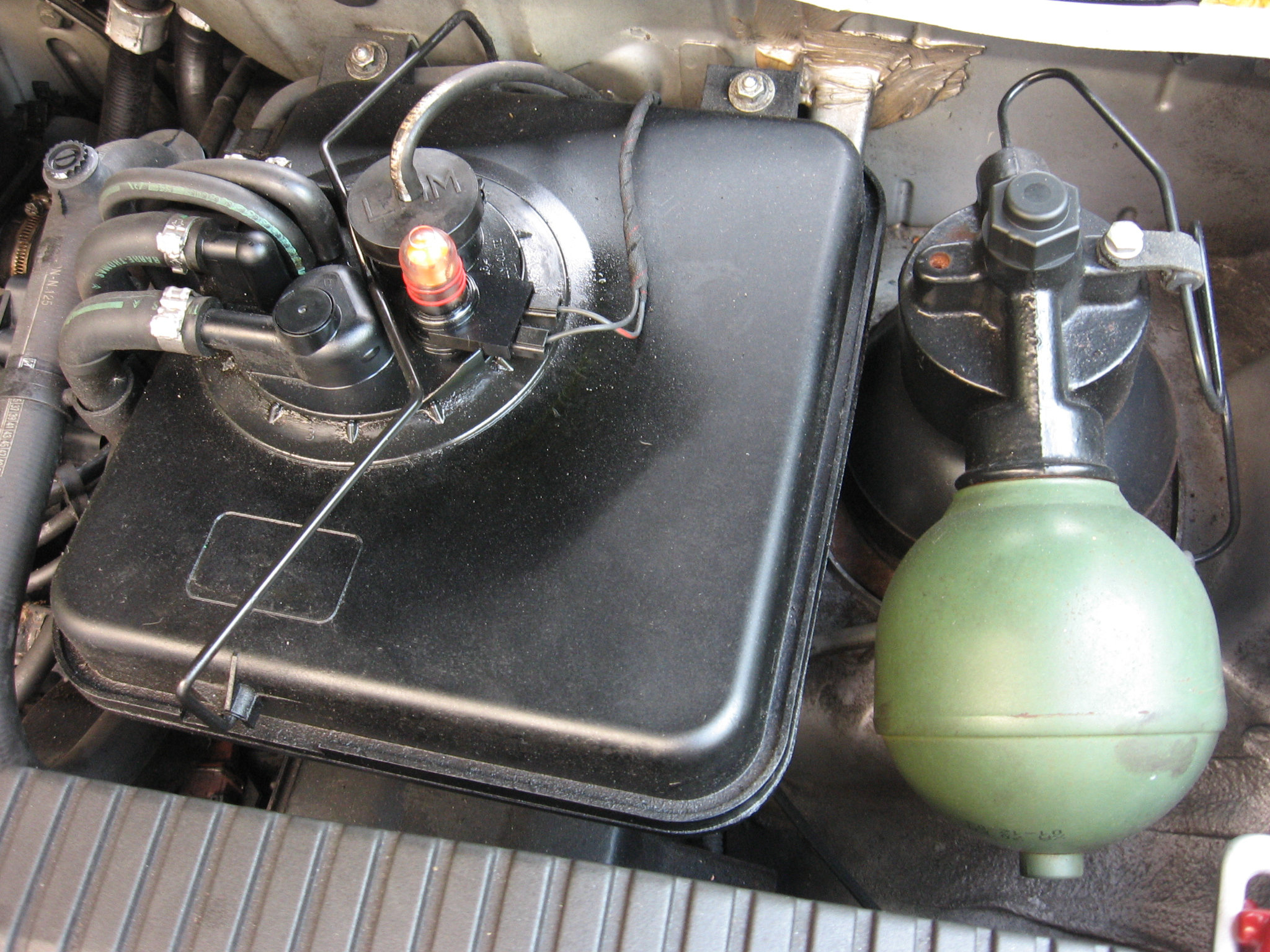
LHM reservoir and green suspension sphere in a Citroën Xantia

To overcome these shortcomings of LHS, Citroën developed a new green fluid, LHM (Liquide Hydraulique Minéral). LHM is a mineral oil, quite close to automatic transmission fluid. Mineral oil is hydrophobic, unlike standard brake fluid; therefore, water-vapour bubbles do not form in the system, as would be the case with standard brake fluid, creating a "spongy" brake feel. Use of mineral oil has thus spread beyond Citroën, Rolls-Royce, Peugeot, and Mercedes-Benz, to include Jaguar, Audi, and BMW.

LHM, being a mineral oil, absorbs only an infinitesimal proportion of moisture, plus it contains corrosion inhibitors. The dust inhalation problem continued, so a filter assembly was fitted into the hydraulic reservoir. Cleaning the filters and changing the fluid at the recommended intervals removes most dust and wear particles from the system, ensuring the longevity of the system. Failure to keep the oil clean is the main cause of problems. It is also imperative to always use the correct fluid for the system; the two types of fluids and their associated system components are not interchangeable. If the wrong type of fluid is used, the system must be drained and rinsed with Hydraflush (Total's Hydraurincage), before draining again and filling with the correct fluid. These procedures are clearly described in DIY manuals obtainable from automotive retailers.

The latest Citroën cars with Hydractive 3 suspension have a new orange coloured LDS hydraulic fluid. This lasts longer and requires less frequent attention. It conforms to DIN 51524-3 for HVLP.

== Manufacturing ==
The whole high-pressure part of the system is manufactured from steel tubing of small diameter, connected to valve control units by Lockheed-type pipe unions with special seals made from Desmopan, a type of polyurethane thermoplastic compatible with the LHM fluid. The moving parts of the system, e.g., suspension struts and steering ramm, are sealed by contact seals between the cylinder and piston for tightness under pressure. The other plastic and rubber parts are return tubes from valves, such as the brake control and height corrector valves, also catching seeping fluid around the suspension push-rods. Height corrector, brake master valve and steering valve spools, and hydraulic pump pistons have extremely small clearances (one to three micrometres) within their cylinders, permitting only a very low leakage rate. The metal and alloy parts of the system rarely fail, even after excessively high mileages, but the elastomer components (especially those exposed to the air) can harden and leak, typical failure points for the system.

Spheres are not subject to mechanical wear but suffer pressure loss due to the pressurised nitrogen diffusing through the membrane. They can, however, be recharged, which is cheaper than replacing them. When Citroën designed their Hydractive 3 suspension they redesigned the spheres with new nylon membranes, which greatly slow the rate of diffusion. These are recognisable by their grey colouring.

Classic (non-saucer) green- and grey-coloured suspension spheres typically last between 60,000 and 100,000 km. Spheres originally had a threaded plug on top for recharging. Newer ('saucer') spheres do not have this plug, but it can be retrofitted, enabling them to be recharged with gas. The sphere membrane has an indefinite life unless run at low pressure, which leads to rupture. Timely recharging, approximately every three years, is thus vital. A ruptured membrane means suspension loss at the attached wheel; however, ride height is unaffected. With no springing other than the (slight) flexibility of tyres, hitting a pothole with a flat sphere can bend the suspension parts or dent a wheel rim. In the case of main accumulator sphere failure, the high-pressure pump is the only source of braking pressure for the front wheels. Some older cars had a separate front-brake accumulator on power-steering models.

The old LHS and LHS2 (coloured red) cars used a different elastomer in the diaphragms and seals that is not compatible with green LHM. The orange LDS fluid in Hydractive cars is also incompatible with other fluids.

== Legacy ==
The principles illustrated by the successful use of hydropneumatic suspension are now used in a broad range of applications, such as aircraft oleo struts and gas filled automobile shock absorbers, first patented in the U.S. in 1934 by Cleveland Pneumatic Tool Co. Similar systems are also widely used on modern tanks and other large military vehicles.

=== Hydractive ===
Hydractive Suspension is an automotive technology introduced by Citroën in 1990. The prototype debuted in 1988 on the Citroën Activa concept. It describes a development of the 1954 hydropneumatic suspension design using additional electronic sensors and driver control of suspension performance. The driver can make the suspension stiffen (sport mode) or ride in outstanding comfort (soft mode). Sensors in the steering, brakes, suspension, throttle pedal and gearbox feed information on the car's speed, acceleration, and road conditions to an on-board computer, which in turn activates or deactivates an extra pair of suspension spheres on the circuit, to enable either a smoother, more supple ride or tighter handling in corners. On the Activa and Activa 2, the car leaned inwards by one degree in turns – Citroën acknowledged that this was somewhat of a marketing gimmick, and that a lean of zero degrees was optimal.

An additional, perhaps unexpected, benefit of active suspension is that fuel consumption and tire wear is reduced overall. The negative camber designed into most suspensions in order to maximize the size of the contact patch when turning causes tire scrub, which wears out tires and increases fuel consumption.

==== Hydractive 1 and Hydractive 2 ====
Citroën Hydractive (and later Hydractive 2) suspension was available on several models, including the XM and Xantia, which had a more advanced sub-model known as the Activa. The first Hydractive suspension systems (now known as Hydractive 1) had two user presets, Sport and Auto. In the Sport setting the car's suspension was always kept in its firmest mode. In the Auto setting, the suspension was switched from soft to firm mode temporarily when a speed-dependent threshold in accelerator pedal movement, brake pressure, steering wheel angle, or body movement was detected by one of several sensors.

In Hydractive 2, the preset names were changed to Sport and Normal. In this new version the Sport setting would no longer keep the suspension system in firm mode, but instead lowered the thresholds significantly for any of the sensor readings also used in Normal mode, allowing for a similar level of body firmness during cornering and acceleration, without the sacrifice in ride quality the Sport mode in Hydractive 1 systems had caused.

Whenever the Hydractive 1 or 2 computers received abnormal sensor information, often caused by malfunctioning electrical contacts, the car's suspension system would be forced into its firm setting for the remainder of the ride.

Starting with Xantia model year 1994 and XM model year 1995, all models featured an additional sphere and valve that together functioned as a pressure reservoir for rear brakes because of new hydraulic locks, letting the car retain normal ride height for several weeks without running the engine. Correctly called the SC/MAC sphere, it often became known as the 'anti-sink' sphere, because of its ability to better maintain rear suspension height.

==== Hydractive 3 ====
The 2001 Citroën C5 has continued development of Hydractive suspension with Hydractive 3. Compared to earlier cars, the C5 stays at normal ride height even when the engine is turned off for an extended period, through the use of electronics. The C5 also uses orange synthetic hydraulic fluid named LDS in place of the green LHM mineral oil used in millions of hydropneumatic vehicles.

A further improved Hydractive 3+ variation was for cars with top engines on the Citroën C5 and in 2005 was standard on the Citroën C6. Hydractive 3+ systems contain additional spheres that can be engaged and disengaged via a Sport button, resulting in a firmer ride.

The Hydractive 3 hydraulic suspension has two automatic modes:

- Motorway position (lowering by 15 mm of the vehicle height above 110 km/h)
- Poor road surface position (raising by 13 mm of the vehicle height below 70 km/h)

The BHI of the Hydractive 3 suspension calculates the optimum vehicle height, using the following information:

- Vehicle speed
- Front and rear vehicle heights

The 3+ Hydractive hydraulic suspension has three automatic modes:

- Motorway position (lowering by 15 mm of the vehicle height above 110 km/h)
- Poor road surface position (raising by 13 mm of the vehicle height below 70 km/h)
- Comfort or dynamic suspension (variation of suspension firmness)

The BHI of the 3+ Hydractive suspension calculates the optimum vehicle height, using the following information:

- Vehicle speed
- Front and rear vehicle heights
- Rotation speed of steering wheel
- Angle of rake of steering wheel
- Vehicle's longitudinal acceleration
- Vehicle's lateral acceleration
- Speed of suspension travel
- Movement of the accelerator throttle

C5 I (2001–2004)

- Hydractive hydraulic suspension 3: EW7J4 and DW10TD engines.
- Hydractive hydraulic suspension 3+: EW10J4, EW10D, ES9J4S and DW12TED4 engines.

C5 II (2004–2007)

- Hydractive hydraulic suspension 3: EW7J4, EW10A, DV6TED4 and DW10BTED4 engines.
- Hydractive hydraulic suspension 3+: ES9A and DW12TED4 engines (prior to RPO No 10645).

C6 (2005–2012)

- Hydractive hydraulic suspension 3+: Standard on all models.

C5 III X7 (2007–2017)

- Hydractive hydraulic suspension 3+: Depends on country and trim.

== See also ==
- Hydrolastic – a type of automotive suspension system used in many cars produced by British Leyland and its successor companies.
- Hydragas – is an improved form of Hydrolastic, using nitrogen-pressurised gas springs, rather than rubber.
- Hydraulic recoil mechanism – uses the same principal for artillery.
- Oleo strut – suspension for most large aircraft, using the same physical properties of air and hydraulic fluid.
- Active Body Control – ABC, is the Mercedes-Benz brand name used to describe hydropneumatic fully active suspension, that allows control of the vehicle body motions and therefore virtually eliminates body roll in many driving situations including cornering, accelerating, and braking.
- Air suspension – a type of vehicle suspension powered by an electric or engine-driven air pump or compressor. This compressor pumps the air into a flexible bellows, usually made from textile-reinforced rubber. The air pressure inflates the bellows, and raises the chassis from the axle.
- Electronic Air Suspension (EAS) is the air suspension system installed on the second version of the Range Rover. Five suspension heights are offered by this system.
