= Self-levelling =

Self-levelling may refer to:

- Self-levelling suspension
- Self-leveling paint
- Self compacting concrete
