= Paul Magès =

French inventor (1908–1999)

Paul Ernest Mary Magès (1908–1999) is known for his invention of the first self-leveling automobile suspension, known as hydro-pneumatic suspension. This system replaced conventional steel springs with an adaptive system of hydraulic struts, resulting in a motoring experience that felt like no other automobile of the era.

This suspension achieved its initial design brief: fast travel on poor road surfaces. This advantage is still noted today, especially in applications where ride quality is important, like ambulance design.

His formal schooling was modest. He earned his National diploma (Brevet d'Etudes du Premier Cycle), a preparatory course for the Académie des Arts et Métiers in Marseille. At age 17, he sent his résumé to Citroën, one of the major automobile manufacturers in France, where he was hired to maintain equipment. In 1936 he became a technical draftsman, and in January 1942, CEO Pierre-Jules Boulanger assigned him to the development department to solve problems with braking and suspension systems (including for the Citroën 2CV).

Magès studied published material on automobile suspension. He was puzzled by the conventional wisdom that a supple suspension system was incompatible with good handling. He had been assigned the task of producing a car with both qualities. He realized that the solution must be located in a variable suspension, one that is very flexible at low speed, and stiff at high speed and load.

This questioning led to the eventual development of a hydro-pneumatic suspension system, which combined an easily compressible gas in an enclosed chamber with the non-compressible, force-multiplication properties of hydraulic machinery. In such a system increasing loads produce higher gas pressures, so the suspension becomes more rigid. Magès ultimately concluded that hydraulic fluid under pressure, delivered by an engine driven accessory –- a hydraulic pump – was the best way to achieve the desired result.

Magès may never have been able to solve this problem if he had better technical training. Marcel Pagnol, the French playwright, famously said "Everyone thought it was impossible, except an idiot who did not know and who created it." Magès kept a copy of this statement on his desk.

Magès also developed DIRAVI speed sensitive power steering, first used on the 1970 Citroën SM.

Many current vehicles use air suspension, to gain some of the advantages of hydro-pneumatic suspension, with slightly less perceived complexity, and use new developments in electronics to achieve speed sensitive power steering.

The 1955 Citroën DS, developed around Magès' engineering innovations, placed third in the 1999 Car of the Century competition, behind the Ford Model T and the BMC/BL Mini.
