= Air suspension =

Type of vehicle suspension

Air suspension is a type of vehicle suspension powered by an electric or engine-driven air pump or compressor. This compressor pumps the air into a flexible bellows, usually made from textile-reinforced rubber. Unlike hydropneumatic suspension, which offers many similar features, air suspension does not use pressurized liquid, but pressurized air. The air pressure inflates the bellows, and raises the chassis from the axle.

== Overview ==
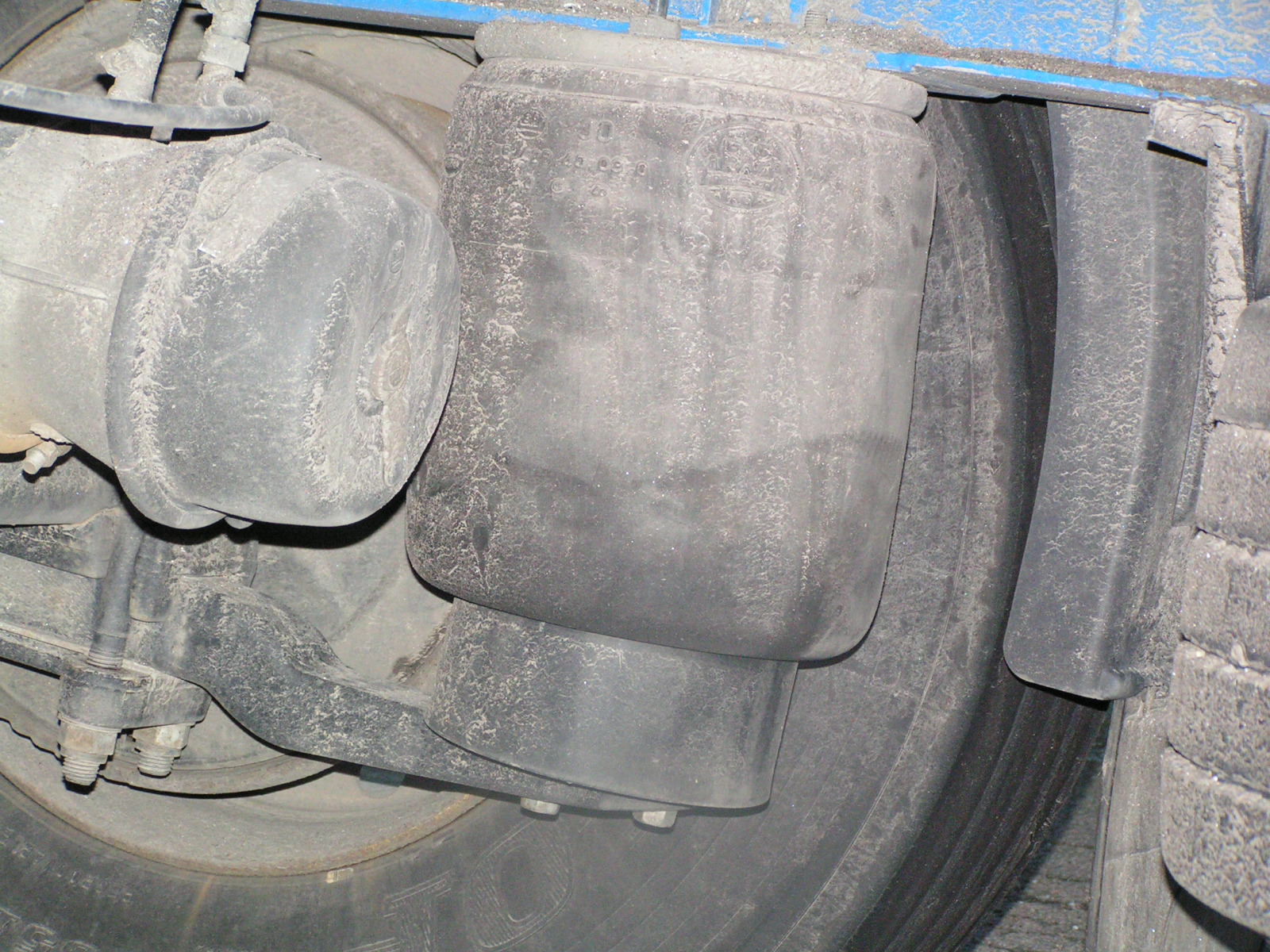
Pneumatic spring on a semitrailer

Air suspension is used in place of conventional steel springs in heavy vehicle applications such as buses and trucks, and in some passenger cars. It is widely used on semi trailers and trains (primarily passenger trains).

The purpose of air suspension is to provide a smooth, constant ride quality, but in some cases is used for sports suspension. Modern electronically controlled systems in automobiles and light trucks almost always feature self-leveling along with raising and lowering functions. Although traditionally called air bags or air bellows, the correct term is air spring (although these terms are also used to describe just the rubber bellows element with its end plates).

== History ==
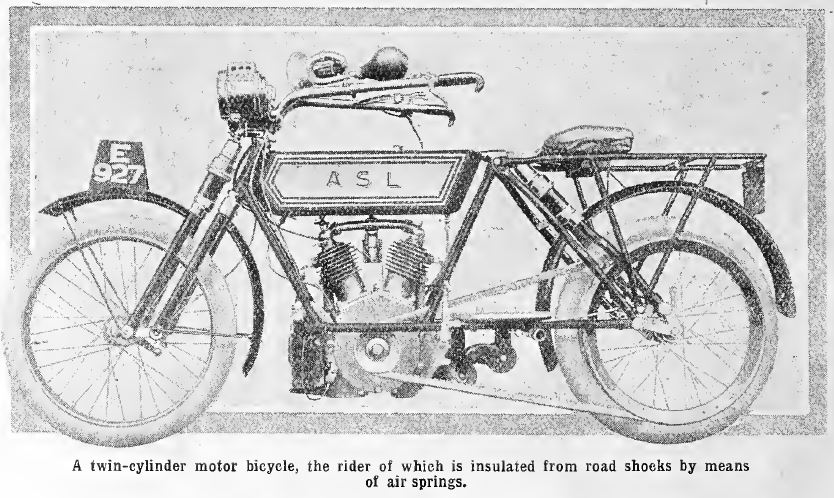
1909 A.S.L. motorcycle with air suspension

On 7 January 1901 the British engineer Archibald Sharp patented a method for making a seal allowing pneumatic or hydraulic apparatus described as a "rolling mitten seal", and on 11 January 1901 he applied for a patent for the use of the device to provide air suspension on bicycles. Further developments using this 1901 seal followed. A company called Air Springs Ltd started producing the A.S.L. motorcycle in 1909. This was unusual in having pneumatic suspension at front and rear - rear suspension being unusual in any form of motorcycle at that time. The suspension units were similar to the normal girder forks with the spring replaced by a telescopic air unit which could be pressurised to suit the rider. Production of the motorcycles ceased in 1914.

On 22 January 1901 an American, William W. Humphreys, patented an idea - a 'Pneumatic Spring for Vehicles'. The design consisted of a left and right air spring longitudinally channeled nearly the length of the vehicle. The channels were concaved to receive two long pneumatic cushions. Each one was closed at one end and provided with an air valve at the other end.

From 1920, Frenchman George Messier provided aftermarket pneumatic suspension systems. His own 1922-1930 Messier automobiles featured a suspension "to hold the car aloft on four gas bubbles."

During World War II, the U.S. developed the air suspension for heavy aircraft in order to save weight with compact construction. Air systems were also used in heavy trucks and aircraft to attain self-levelling suspension. With adjustable air pressure, the axle height was independent of vehicle load.

In 1946, American William Bushnell Stout built a non-production prototype Stout Scarab that featured numerous innovations, including a four-wheel independent air suspension system.

In 1950, Air Lift Company patented a rubber air spring that is inserted into a car's factory coil spring. The air spring expanded into the spaces in the coil spring, keeping the factory spring from fully compressing, and the vehicle from sagging. The air springs were also commonly used on NASCAR race cars for many years.

In 1954, Frenchman Paul Magès developed a functioning air/oil hydropneumatic suspension, incorporating the advantages of earlier air suspension concepts, but with hydraulic fluid rather than air under pressure. Citroën replaced the conventional steel springs on the rear axle of their top-of-range model, the Traction Avant 15 Hydraulique. In 1955, the Citroën DS incorporated four wheel hydropneumatic suspension. This combined a very soft, comfortable suspension, with controlled movements, for sharp handling, together with a self-levelling suspension.

In 1956 air suspension was used on EMD's experimental Aerotrain.

In the U.S., General Motors built on its World War II experience with air suspension for trucks and airplanes. It introduced air suspension as standard equipment on the new 1957 Cadillac Eldorado Brougham. An "Air Dome" assembly at each wheel included sensors to compensate for uneven road surfaces and to automatically maintain the car's height. For 1958 and 1959, the system continued on the Eldorado Brougham, and was offered as an extra cost option on other Cadillacs.

In 1958, Buick introduced an optional "Air-Poised Suspension" with four cylinders of air (instead of conventional coil springs) for automatic leveling, as well as a "Bootstrap" control on the dashboard to raise the car 5.5 inches (139.7 millimetres) for use on steep ramps or rutted country roads, as well as for facilitating tire changes or to clean the whitewall tires. For 1959, Buick offered an optional "Air Ride" system on all models that combined "soft-rate" steel coil springs in the front with air springs in the rear.

An optional air suspension system was available on the 1958 and 1959 Rambler Ambassadors, as well as on all American Motors "Cross Country" station wagon models. The "Air-Coil Ride" utilized an engine-driven compressor, reservoir, air bags within the coil springs, and a ride-height control, but the $99 optional system was not popular among buyers and American Motors (AMC) discontinued it for 1960.

Only Cadillac continued to offer air suspension through the 1960 model year, where it was standard equipment on the Eldorado Seville, Biarritz, and Brougham.

In 1960, the Borgward P 100 was the first German car with self-levelling air suspension.

In 1962, the Mercedes-Benz W112 platform featured an air suspension on the 300SE models. The system used a Bosch main valve with two axle valves on the front and one on the rear. These controlled a cone-shaped air spring on each wheel axle. The system maintained a constant ride height utilizing an air reservoir that was filled by a single-cylinder air compressor powered by the engine. In 1964, the Mercedes-Benz 600 used larger air springs and the compressed air system also powered the brake servo.

Rolls-Royce incorporated self-levelling suspension on the 1965 Rolls-Royce Silver Shadow, a system built under license from Citroën.

In 1975, the Mercedes-Benz 450SEL 6.9 incorporated a hydropneumatic suspension when the patents on the technology had expired. This design replaced the expensive, complex, and problematic compressed air system that was still used on the 600 models until 1984.

Air suspension was not included in standard production American-built cars between 1960 and 1983. In 1984, Ford Motor Company incorporated a new design as a feature on the Lincoln Continental Mark VII.

In 1986, Nissan installed an airbag modification to MacPherson Struts on the Cedric and Gloria.

Dunlop Systems Coventry UK were also pioneers of electronically controlled air suspension (ECAS) for off-road vehicles - the term ECAS was successfully trade marked. The system was first fitted to the 1993 model year Land Rover Range Rover.

In 2005 the GM Hummer H2 featured an optional rear air suspension system with a dual compressor control system from Dunlop to support tire inflation for off-road applications.

== Modern automobiles ==
Vehicle marques that have used air suspension on their models include: Audi, Acura, Bentley, BMW, Cadillac, Citroën, Ford, Genesis, Hummer, Hyundai, Jaguar, Jeep, Land Rover, Lamborghini, Lexus, Lincoln, Mercedes-Benz, Mercedes--Maybach, Porsche, Ram, Rivian, Rolls-Royce, SsanYong, Subaru, Tesla, Volkswagen, Volvo, and more.

Companies such as Jaguar and Porsche have introduced systems on some of their models that change the spring rate and damping settings of the suspension, among other changes, for their sport/track modes. The Lincoln Mark VIII had suspension settings which were linked to the memory seat system, meaning that the car would automatically adjust the suspension to individual drivers.

Most air suspension designs are height adjustable, making it easier to enter the vehicle, clear bumps, or clear rough terrain. Since a car with lower ground clearance has different aerodynamic characteristics, automakers can use active suspension technology to improve efficiency or handling. Tesla, for instance, uses "Active Air Suspension" on the Model S and Model X to lower or raise the vehicle for aerodynamics and increased range.

In 2014 the new Mercedes S-Class Coupe introduced an update to Magic Body Control, called Active Curve Tilting. This new system allows the vehicle to lean up to 2.5 degrees into a turn, similar to a tilting train. The leaning is intended to counter the effect of centrifugal force on the occupants and is available only on rear-wheel drive models.

== Custom applications ==
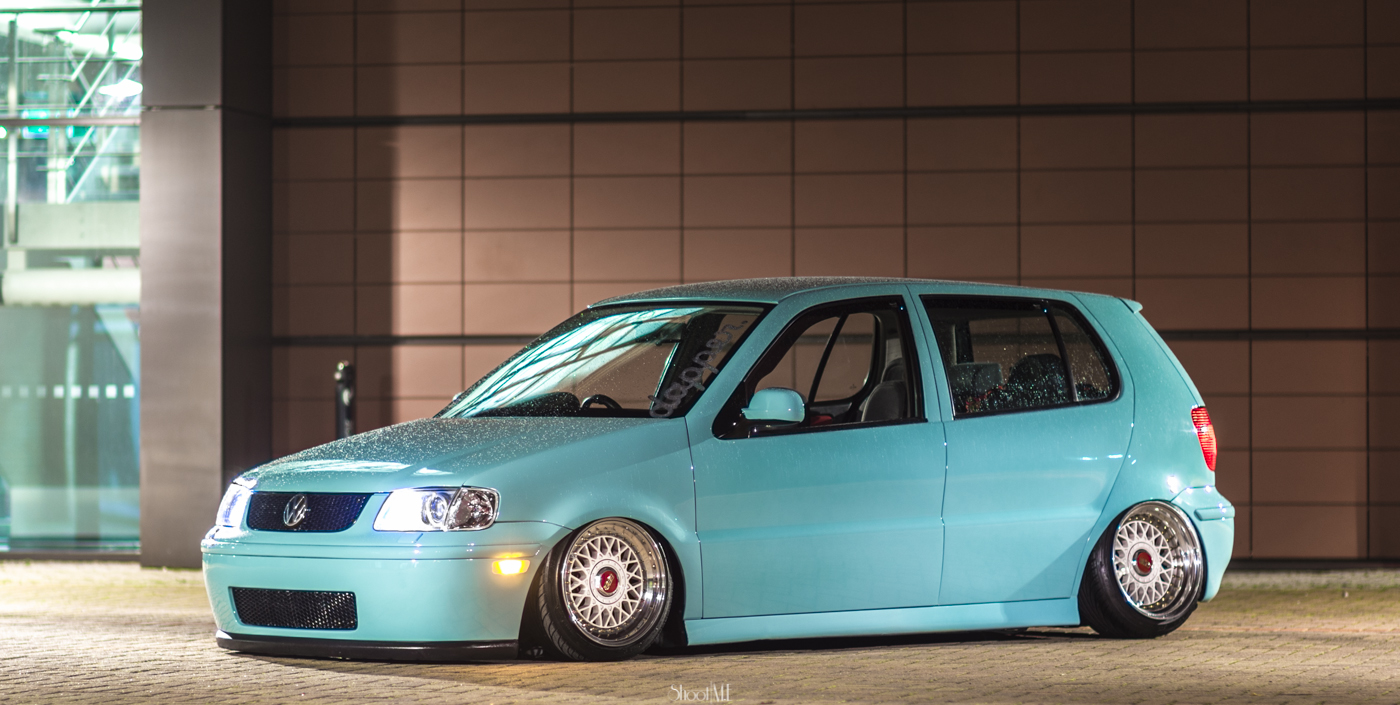
Customised VW Polo with fully lowered air suspension, note camber of rear wheels coupled with 'fitment' of the rim

Air suspension has become popular in the custom automobile culture: street rods, trucks, cars, and even motorcycles may have air springs. They are used in these applications to provide an adjustable suspension which allows vehicles to sit extremely low, yet be able rise to a level high enough to maneuver over obstacles and inconsistencies on paved surfaces. These systems generally employ small, electric or engine-driven air compressors which sometimes fill an on-board air receiver tank which stores compressed air for use in the future without delay. It is important that the tank is sized for the task and can be calculated using a specific formula involving the compressor output, standard atmospheric pressure and compressed pressure.

High-pressured industrial gas bottles (such as nitrogen or carbon dioxide tanks used to store shielding gases for welding) are sometimes used in more radical air suspension setups. Either of these reservoir systems may be fully adjustable, being able to adjust each wheel's air pressure individually. This allows the user to tilt the vehicle side-to-side, front-to-back, in some instances "hit a 3-wheel" (contort the vehicle so one wheel lifts up from the ground) or even "hop" the entire vehicle into the air. When a pressure reservoir is present, the flow of air or gas is commonly controlled with pneumatic solenoid valves. This allows the user to make adjustments by simply pressing a momentary-contact electric button or switch.

The installation and configuration of these systems varies for different makes and models but the underlying principle remains the same. The metal spring (coil or leaf) is removed, and an air bag, also referred to as an air spring, is inserted or fabricated to fit in the place of the factory spring. When air pressure is supplied to the air bag, the suspension can be adjusted either up or down (lifted or lowered).

For vehicles with leaf spring suspension such as pickup trucks, the leaf spring is sometimes eliminated and replaced with a multiple-bar linkage. These bars are typically in a trailing arm configuration and the air spring may be situated vertically between a link bar or the axle housing and a point on the vehicle's frame. In other cases, the air bag is situated on the opposite side of the axle from the main link bars on an additional cantilever member. If the main linkage bars are oriented parallel to the longitudinal (driving) axis of the car, the axle housing may be constrained laterally with either a Panhard rod or Watt's linkage. In some cases, two of the link bars may be combined into a triangular shape which effectively constrains the vehicles axle laterally.

Often, owners may desire to lower their vehicle to such an extent that they must cut away portions of the frame for more clearance. A reinforcement member commonly referred to as a C-notch is then bolted or welded to the vehicle frame in order to maintain structural integrity. Specifically on pickup trucks, this process is termed "notching" because a portion (notch) of the cargo bed may also be removed, along with the wheel wells, to provide maximum axle clearance. For some, it is desirable to have the vehicle so low that the frame rests on the ground when the air bags are fully deflated. Owners generally choose between having their cars 'tuck' their wheels into the arches when their air suspension is fully lowered or alternatively they can choose to go for 'fitment' which in partnership with stretched tyres sees the arch itself fit in between the tyre and rim.

Air suspension is also a common suspension upgrade for those who tow or haul heavy loads with their pick-up truck, SUV, van or car. Air springs, also called "air helper springs," are placed on existing suspension components on the rear or front of the vehicle in order to increase the load capacity. One of the advantages of using air suspension as a load support enhancement is the air springs can be deflated when not towing or hauling and therefore maintaining the factory ride quality.

=== Electronic air suspension ===
Electronic Controlled Air Suspension (ECAS) is the name of the air suspension system installed on the Range Rover Classic in 1993 and later on the Range Rover P38A. It was developed in the early 1990s by the company now known as Dunlop Systems and Components Ltd in Coventry, UK.

ECAS provides variable-height suspension for on- and off-road applications. The five suspension heights typically offered by ECAS are (from lowest to highest in terms of height) "Loading," "Highway," "Standard," "Off-Road," and "Off-Road Extended." Height is controlled automatically based on speed and undercarriage sensors, but a manual ride height switch allows control over the suspension by the driver. The "Loading" and "Off-Road" heights are available only at speeds typically less than 35 miles per hour (56 km/h). The "Highway" setting is not available manually; it is set when the vehicle moves at over typically 50 miles per hour (80 km/h) for over 30 seconds. Unlike a mechanical spring system (where deflection is proportional to load), height may be varied independently from the load by altering the pressure in the air springs.

The air springs were designed to provide a smooth ride, with the additional ability to raise the body of the vehicle for off-road clearance and lower it for higher-speeds road driving. Mechanical springs, for which deflection is proportional to load, cannot do this; with ECAS height is largely independent of load. The developers of ECAS also designed LoadSafe, a related system to ascertain load and change in load on an LCV type vehicle fitted with air springs.

==== Components ====
The system comprises:

- a vulcanised rubber air spring at each wheel
- an air compressor, which is typically located in the trunk (boot) or under the bonnet
- a compressed air storage tank may be included for rapid "kneel", storing air at ~150psi (1000 kPa), note (1psi=6.89kPa)
- a valve block which routes air from the storage tank to the four air springs via a series of solenoids, valves and many o-rings
- an ECAS computer which communicates with the car's main computer the BeCM and decides where to route air pressure
- a series of 6 mm air pipes which channel air throughout the system (mainly from the storage tank to the air springs via the valve block)
- an air drier canister containing desiccant
- height sensors ideally on all 4 vehicle corners based, typically, on resistive contact sensing to give an absolute height reference for each corner of the vehicle.

Dunlop Systems and Components Ltd have continued to develop the products to the point where the electronic control unit (ECU) is now able to fit under the vehicle floor. The control valves are much smaller and lighter and they produce their own range of compressors.

=== Multi-chamber air suspension ===
The multi-chamber air suspension is a suspension capable of controlling the spring characteristics of the air suspension step by step.

Multi-chamber air suspension implemented on the Genesis G90 consists of three chambers. Three chambers are used for a smooth ride, and one chamber is used for a dynamic driving feeling. A solenoid valve located between each chamber and a separate electronic control unit oversees the control process. In addition, the basic minimum ground height of 148mm is divided into four stages: high, normal, low, and ultra-low according to the driving mode, driving speed, and driving environment. depending on the driving mode, driving speed, and driving environment. And it informs the driver of the garage control through the infotainment screen. The speed bump control, the hump control, the slope control, and the high-speed driving control functions are activated under the air suspension control.

== Common air suspension problems ==
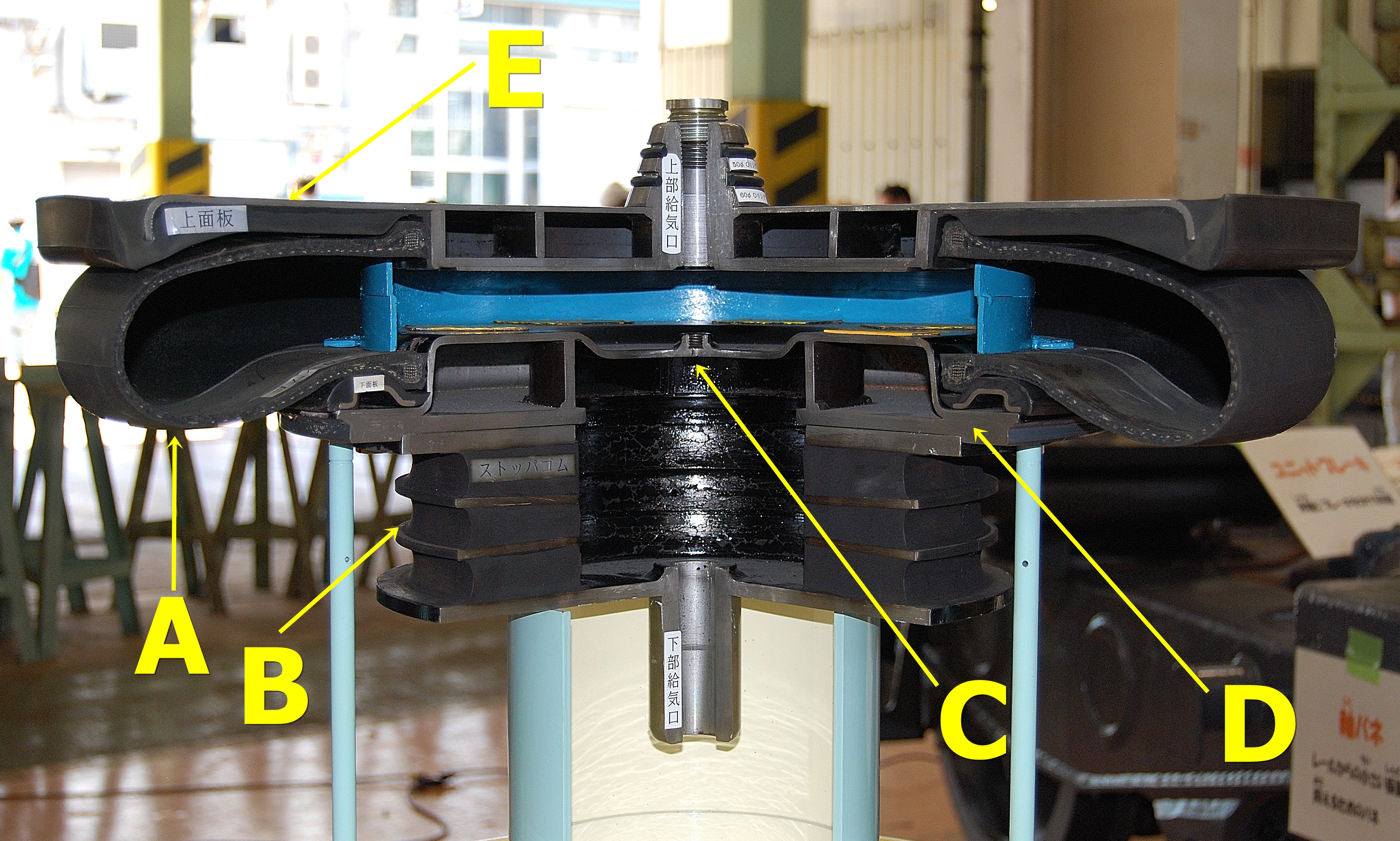
Cut-way of a deflated railway vehicle air spring bellows. 'A' is the rubber bellows element

Air bag or air strut failure is usually caused by wet rust, due to old age, or moisture within the air system that damages it from the inside. Air ride suspension parts may fail because rubber dries out. Punctures to the air bag may be caused from debris on the road. With custom applications, improper installation may cause the air bags to rub against the vehicle's frame or other surrounding parts, damaging it. The over-extension of an air spring which is not sufficiently constrained by other suspension components, such as a shock absorber, may also lead to the premature failure of an air spring through the tearing of the flexible layers. Failure of an air spring may also result in complete immobilization of the vehicle, since the vehicle will rub against the ground or be too high to move. However, most modern automotive systems have overcome many of these problems.

Air line failure is a failure of the tubing which connects the air bags or struts to the rest of the air system, and is typically DOT-approved nylon air brake line. This usually occurs when the air lines, which must be routed to the air bags through the chassis of the vehicle, rub against a sharp edge of a chassis member or a moving suspension component, causing a hole to form. This mode of failure will typically take some time to occur after the initial installation of the system, as the integrity of a section of air line is compromised to the point of failure due to the rubbing and resultant abrasion of the material. An air line failure may also occur if a piece of road debris hits an air line and punctures or tears it, although this is unlikely to occur in normal road use. It does occur in harsh off-road conditions but it still not common if correctly installed.

Air fitting failure usually occurs when they are first fitted or very rarely in use. Cheap low quality components tend to be very unreliable. Air fittings are used to connect components such as bags, valves, and solenoids to the air line that transfers the air. They are screwed into the component and for the most part push-in or push-to-fit DOT line is then inserted into the fitting.

Compressor failure is primarily due to leaking air springs or air struts. The compressor will burn out trying to maintain the correct air pressure in a leaking air system. Compressor burnout may also be caused by moisture from within the air system coming into contact with its electronic parts. This is far more likely to occur with low specification compressors with insufficient duty cycle which are often purchased due to low cost. For redundancy in the system two compressors are often a better option.

In dryer failure the dryer, which functions to remove moisture from the air system, eventually becomes saturated and unable to perform that function. This causes moisture to build up in the system and can result in damaged air springs and/or a burned out compressor.

=== ECAS problems ===
The ECAS computer can, using pre-programmed criteria to detect a fault, disable the system into "Hard Fault Mode" which lowers the vehicle to the suspension bump-stops, leaving it usable with radically reduced performance until repaired.

Many enthusiasts use diagnostic devices such as laptop and hand computers running specially developed software to clear spurious faults and avoid the need for repair. Some manipulate the sensors to set the vehicle to a particular ride height at all times by adjusting the lever ratio on the height-sensing devices, or a supplementary ECU to "fool" the system.

Leaks in the system, often due to main seal wear caused by excessive duty cycle, can cause premature compressor failure.

== Use on coaches and buses ==
Air springs are used in bus suspensions due to a wide range of advantages over mechanical springs. Compared to a mechanical spring, air suspension can adjust to different vehicle weights by increasing the pressure in the air bag, allowing vehicle height to be maintained at a particular value. Standard coaches also have a system called ferry lift, which raises the vehicle and increases its breakover angle. This system aids loading and unloading the coach on and off ferries due to their steep ramps and risk of grounding out, but can also be used on rough ground or on steep crests. Although the ferry lift may be installed on some buses, the Kneel Down facility is more common on public transport buses. This helps reduce the step height for easy passenger ingress. The Kneel Down facility is also used when using the built-in wheelchair ramps. Due to several advantages, air suspension has been extensively used in commercial vehicles since 1980.

== See also ==
- Active suspension
- Arnott Air Suspension Products
- Automotive suspension design
- Coil spring
- Dashpot
- Double wishbone suspension
- Height adjustable suspension
- Hydropneumatic suspension
- Leaf spring
- Self-levelling suspension
- Strut bar
- Sway bar
- Torsion bar suspension
