= Height adjustable suspension =

Automobile suspension systems

Height adjustable suspension is a feature of certain automobile suspension systems that allow the motorist to vary the ride height or ground clearance. This can be done for various reasons including giving better ground clearance over rough terrain, a lower ground clearance to improve performance and fuel economy at high speed, or for stylistic reasons. Such a feature requires fairly sophisticated engineering.

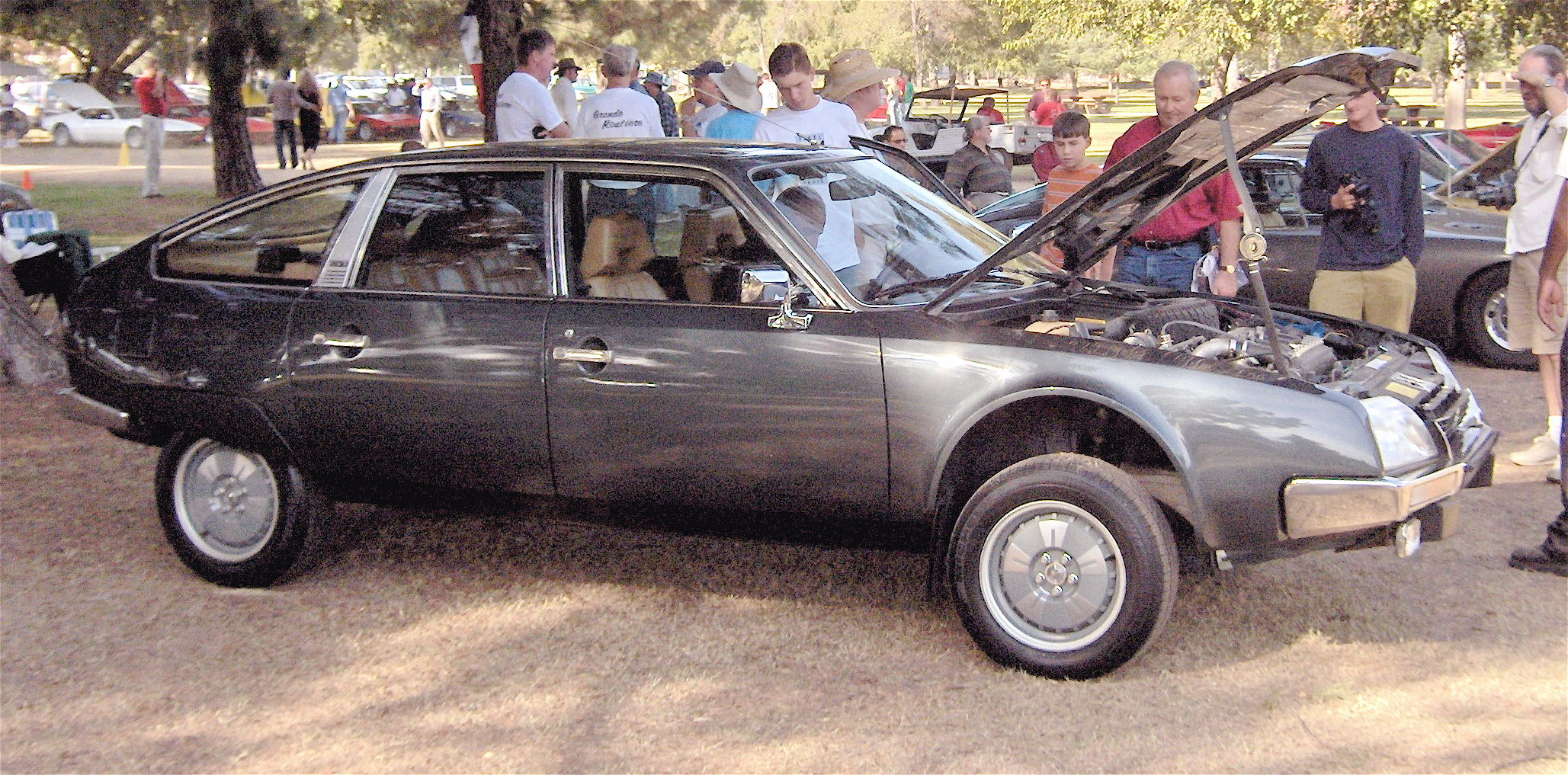
Citroën CX in high position

Height adjustment is most often achieved by air or oil compression used for the "springs" of the vehicle – when the pressure is varied, the vehicle body rises or lowers.

== Factory systems for cars ==
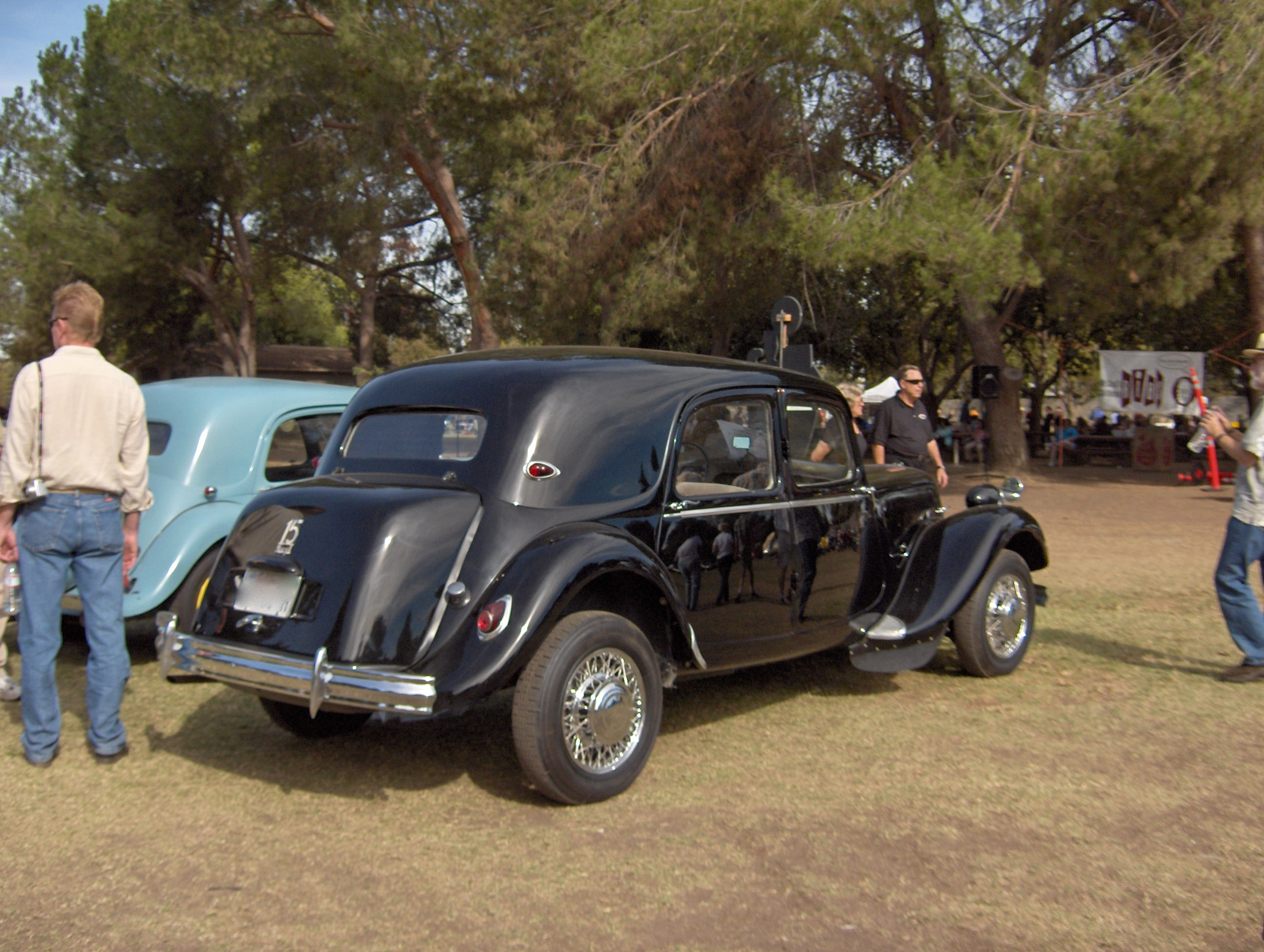
Height adjustable suspension from 1954 – high position

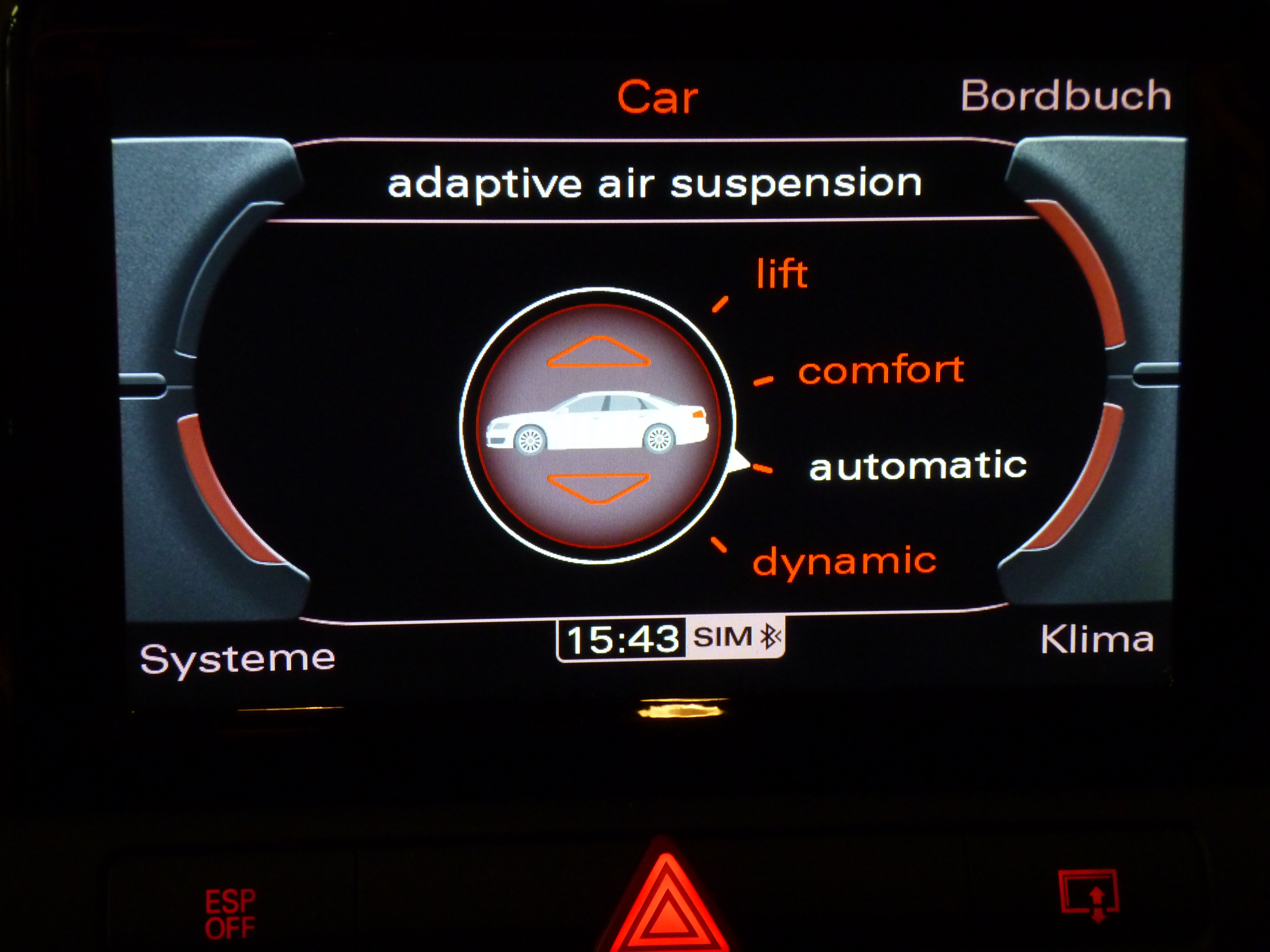
An Audi A8 Multi Media Interface control screen for its Adaptive Air Suspension, which gives the vehicle clearance a range from 95 mm to 145 mm

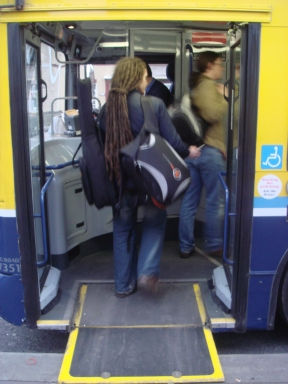
Kneeling bus in Dublin

The first instance of a production vehicle with adjustable (rear only) suspension was on the 1954 Citroën 15CVH. This vehicle featured a self-leveling, height adjustable hydropneumatic suspension. Since that time, these systems have appeared continuously on Citroën models, including the DS and CX.

Height adjustable suspension was banned in the United States from 1974 to 1981, due to the stringent interpretation of passenger vehicle bumper height regulations by the U.S. government agency NHTSA.

Subaru was one of a few manufacturers who offered the feature after the ban was lifted on the Subaru XT, the Subaru Leone wagon and the Subaru Legacy for a short time.

Many modern SUVs use height adjustability as part of active suspension systems to improve the vehicle's versatility on and off-road. The Range Rover offered this feature from 1993. New models of the Ford Expedition have a computer-controlled system designed for convenience, which lowers automatically when the doors are unlocked by remote, returns to normal height when the vehicle is started, and (on 4-wheel-drive models), raises when the 4×4 system is engaged.

Some cars use these systems to improve the vehicle's handling by lowering the vehicle's height during higher speeds – a current example being the Mercedes-Benz Active Body Control system. Another example is the Audi A8, which when driven at speeds of more than 120 km/h for more than 30 seconds reduces its clearance from 120 mm to 95 mm.

The 2011 Jeep Grand Cherokee includes adjustable suspension in the 4×4 model. It automatically lowers when the Park selection is engaged, and also at high speeds to improve aerodynamics. It also allows drivers to manually raise the suspension for off-road situations.

Starting in 2012, the Tesla Model S and Tesla Model X offer their own patented height adjustable suspension as an option. Two goals are accomplished – the long, low slung car can be raised to avoid road obstacles – it also lowers at speed on the highway to improve aerodynamics.

== Factory systems for buses ==
Height adjustable air suspensions are also equipped on some buses, mainly "low-floor" city buses or "kneeling buses", however in recent years some high floor charter/intercity buses have been equipped with this feature as well. This allows the floor to be lowered when the bus is stopped, to allow people with large or bulky luggage, passengers with disabilities, or simply when stopping at stops with unusual curb arrangements to enter or exit the vehicle easily. It can also raise the bus more than normal, which is useful when navigating roads with large amounts of speed humps, crossing railway lines or in other unusual, but not always uncommon situations.

Assistive technology for persons with disabilities includes vehicles modified with height adjustable suspension, for example to allow wheelchair entry to the vehicle.

== Aftermarket systems ==
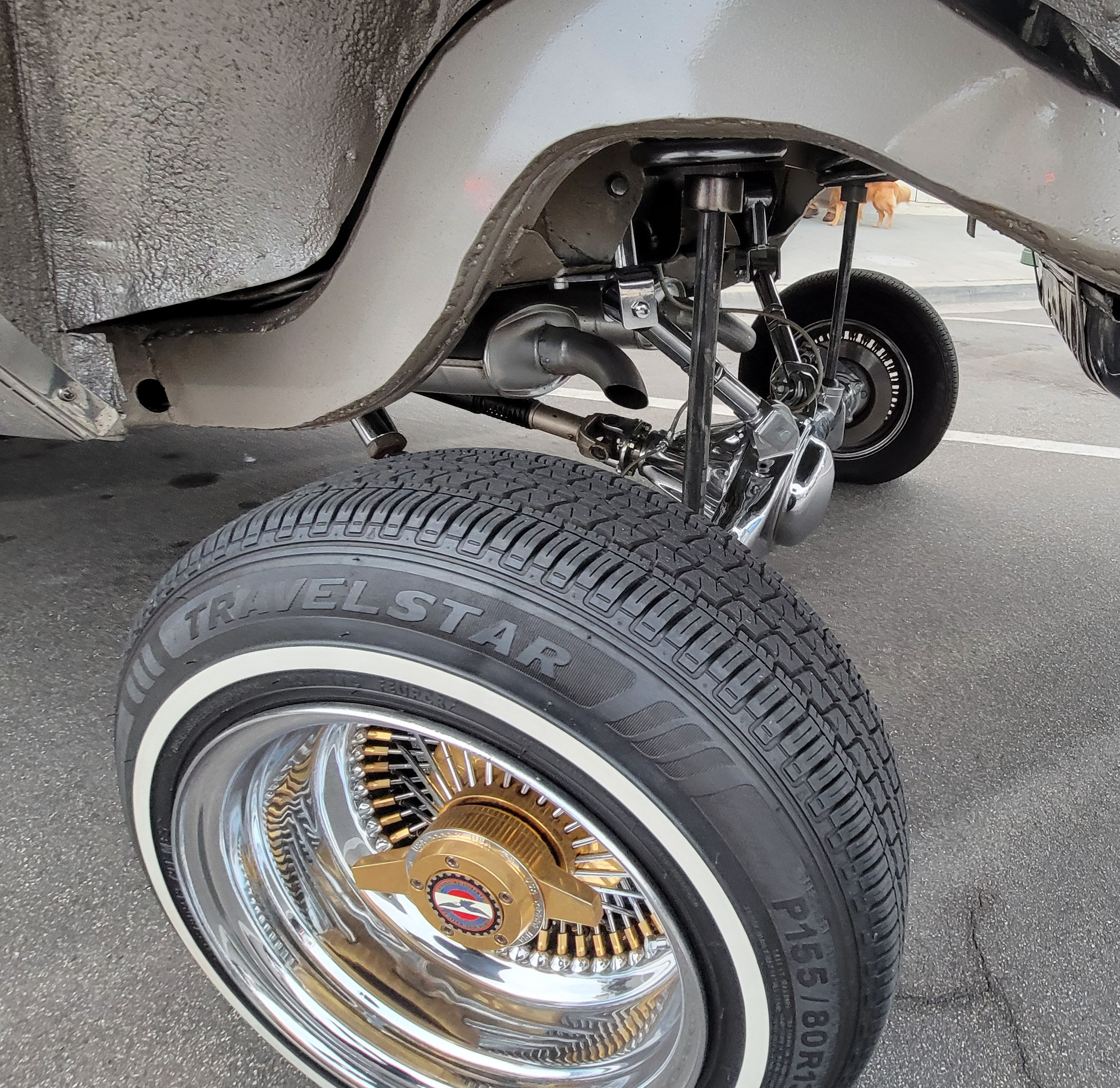
Rear axle suspension of a lowrider

In 1959, auto customizer Ron Aguirre scavenged the Pesco pumps and valves from a B-52 Bomber and adapted them to the front suspension of his X-Sonic bubble-topped custom car Corvette, allowing him to change the height of the car with a switch on the dashboard. This was done to evade California law regarding ground clearance. Aguirre is commonly accepted as the first person to create a Lowrider car with hydraulically adjustable suspension.

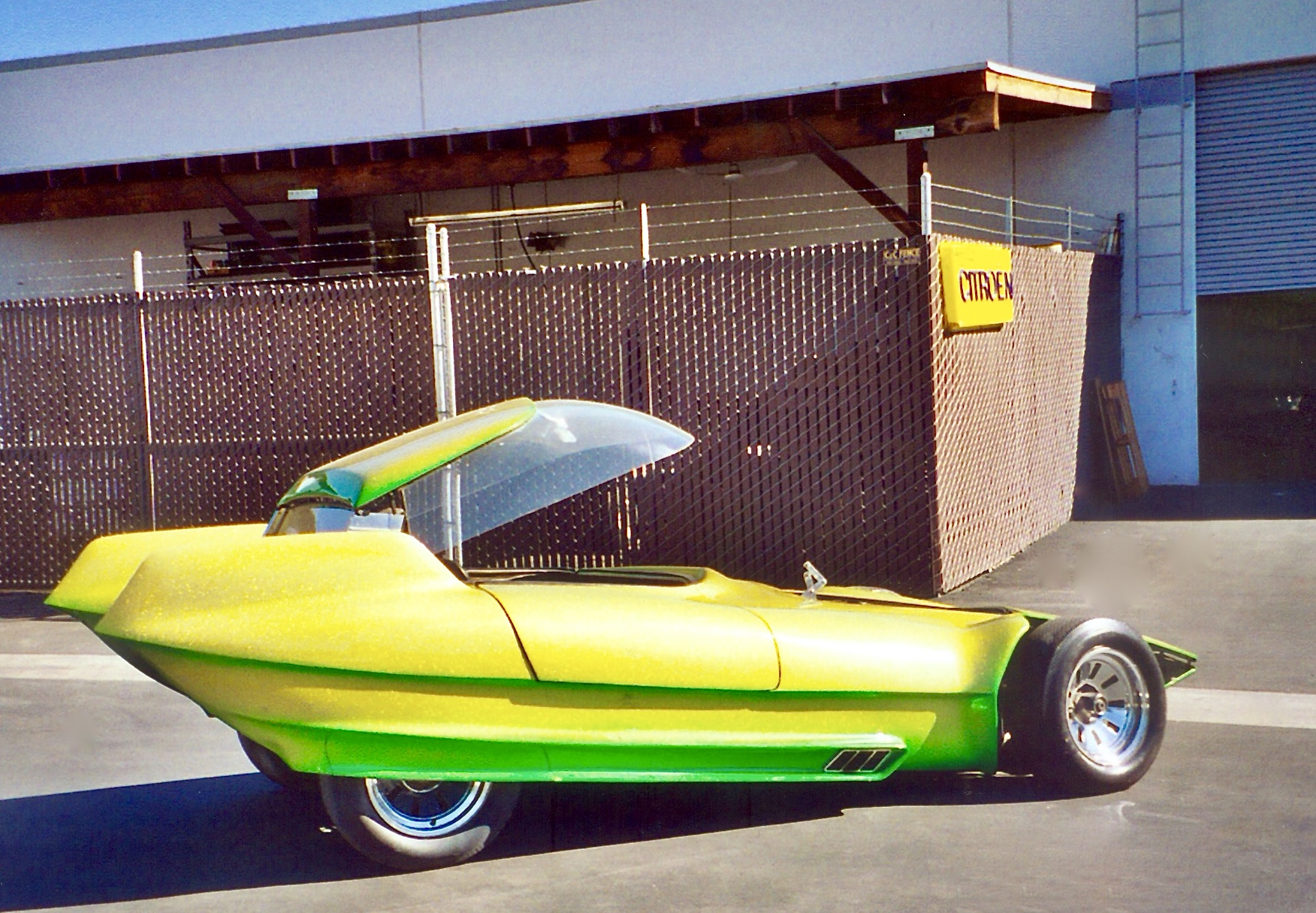
The Reactor by Gene Winfield

In 1964, another customizer, Gene Winfield, created The Reactor, with Citroën height adjustable Hydropneumatic suspension, a car novel enough to guest star in several television programs.

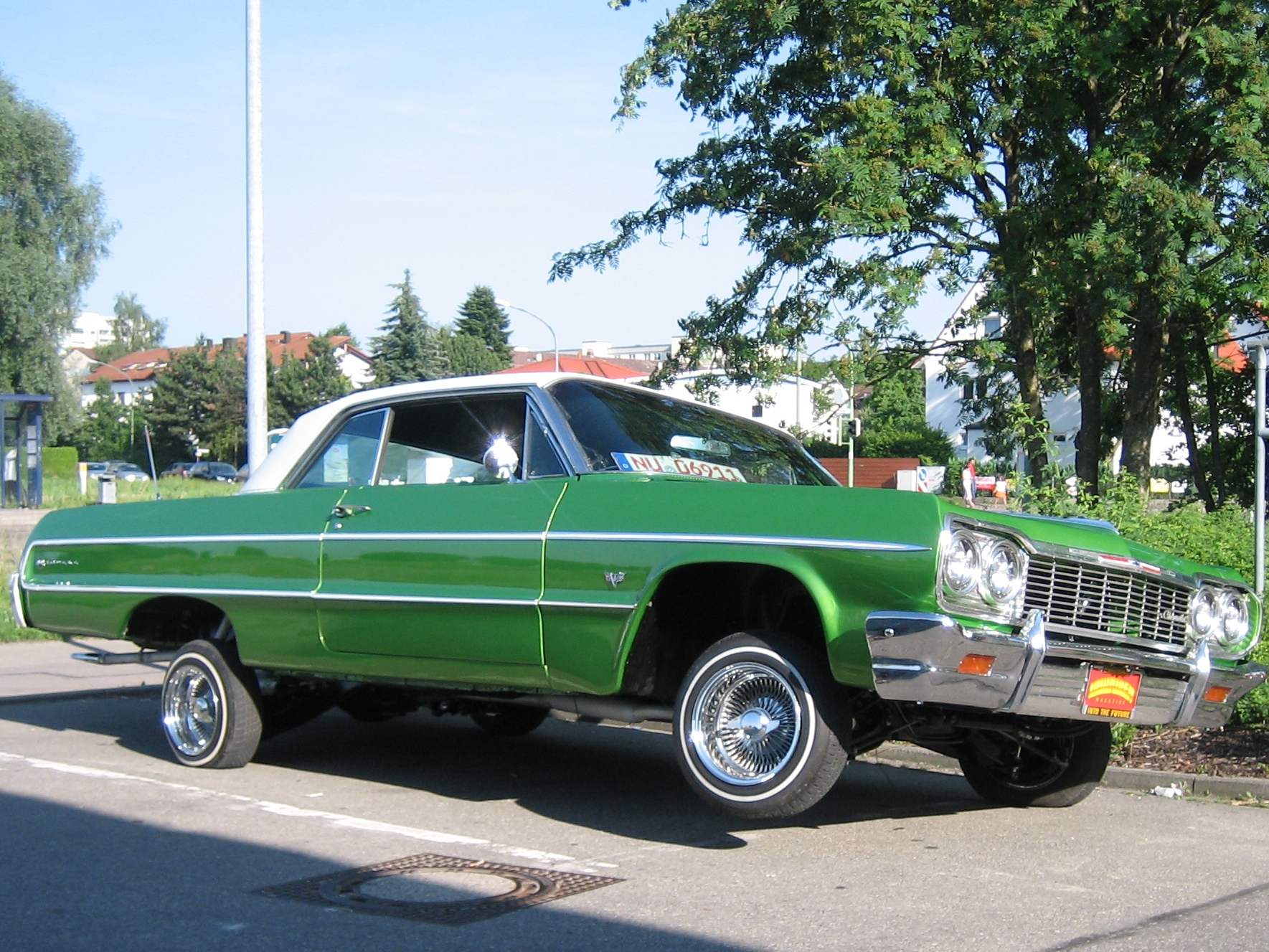
Aftermarket height adjustable suspension installed on a 1964 Chevrolet Impala lowrider

Adjustable suspensions have become intrinsically associated with lowrider vehicles. The popular image of these vehicles is of one "hopping" on its suspension, or sitting with one wheel completely off the ground. These systems were initially adapted from the hydraulic pistons, valves and pumps used to adjust the flaps on aircraft. Today however, many aftermarket companies produce parts and equipment specifically designed for lowriders.

In recent years "air bag" systems (not to be confused with the air bag safety device) have gained popularity among car customizers. These air suspension systems use heavy-duty rubber "bags" to replace the stock shocks and springs, with either a compressor or tank of compressed gas used to raise and lower the vehicle at will.

== User control ==
The first height adjustable suspension systems were controlled by the driver manually.

With the development of computer controls, research is ongoing into electronic control of the height adjustment process. Certain modern layouts allow electronics alone to make this decision without the driver's control, notably the Tesla Model S and Tesla Model X
