= Mercedes-Benz Vario Research Car =

The Mercedes-Benz Vario Research Car was a concept study by then Daimler-Benz unveiled at the 1995 Geneva Motor Show. The goal was to show off control, design, and comfort innovations in passenger cars.

== Innovations ==
- Interchangeable bodies: sedan, station wagon, convertible, and pickup on the same chassis, conversion achieved within 15 minutes.
- Light and sturdy bodies of carbon-fibre reinforced plastic (CFRP).
- Drive-by-wire technology, in which the steering and the brakes, for example, are activated electrically with no mechanical steering or braking.
- Active Body Control (ABC). Production launch in the Mercedes-Benz C215.
- Colour display (series launch in the Mercedes-Benz S-Class (W220)).
- Central rotary control to operate electronic functions. Production launch in the Mercedes-Benz S-Class (W221).
