= Self-levelling suspension =

Automobile suspension system

Self-levelling refers to an automobile suspension system that maintains a constant ride height of the vehicle above the road, regardless of load.

== Purpose ==
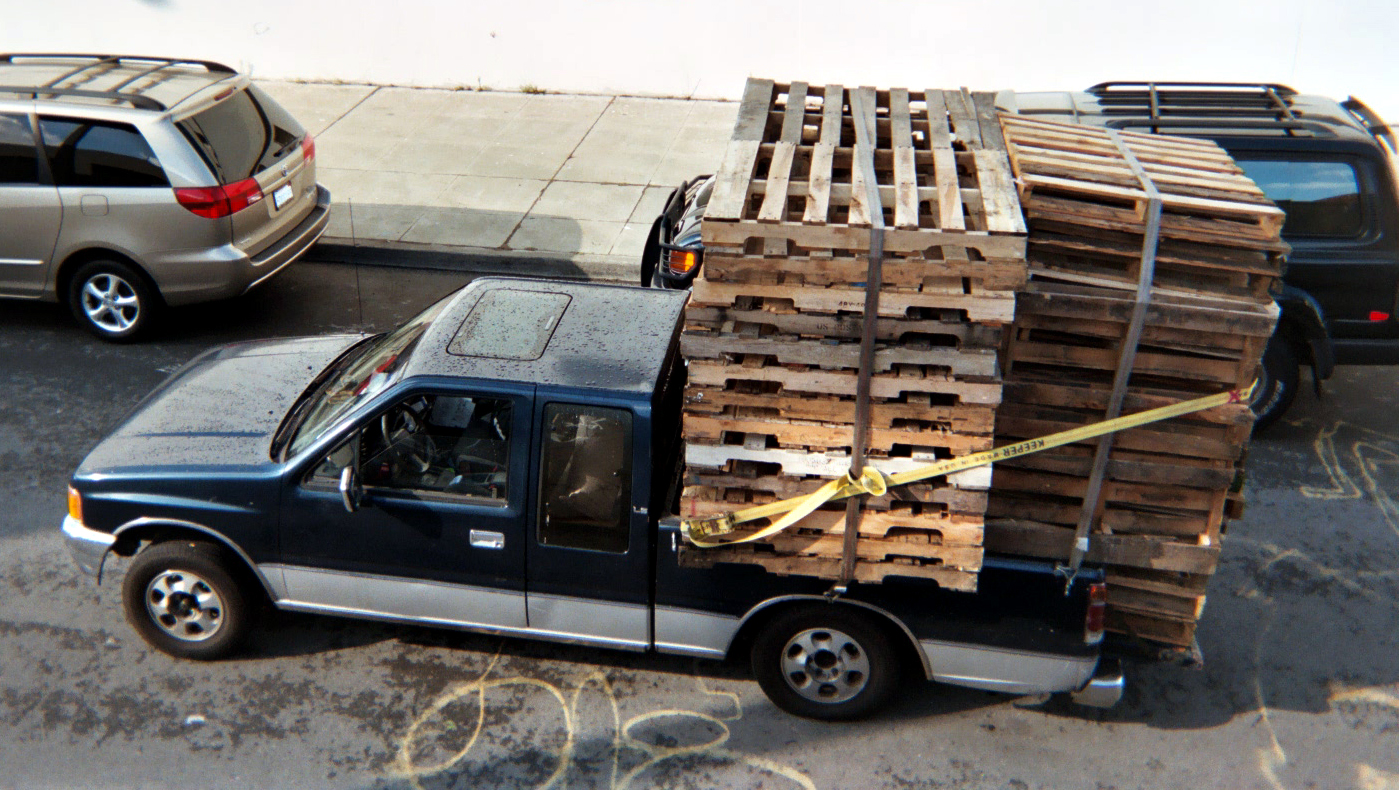
Nose up, tail down attitude of vehicle without self-levelling suspension

Many vehicle systems on a conventional vehicle are negatively affected by the change in attitude coming from changes in load - specifically a heavy load in the rear seat or luggage compartment. This change in attitude affects aerodynamic properties, headlight aim, braking, bumpers, shock absorption from the suspension and the vehicle's performance in a collision.

There is an inherent conflict in suspension design - if the springs are soft, the car will be comfortable but dramatically affected by load. If the springs are hard, the car will be uncomfortable, but less affected by load.

Numerous manufacturers realize this conflict and have pursued different avenues to achieve both comfort and load capacity simultaneously.

== History ==
In France in 1954, Citroën introduced the first self-levelling rear suspension on a production car, and then in 1955 pioneered self-levelling of all four wheels, using its hydropneumatic system. These cars maintain an exact height over the road when the engine is on - height control valves attached to the roll bars via linkages would open to add or drain fluid from the suspension, and when the desired height was reached the valve would automatically close due to its design. Later models would use electronic height sensors and motors so adjustment could be achieved with the engine off.

This system allowed the suspension to achieve an unusually soft ride quality.

Since then, millions of fairly inexpensive Citroën cars have been equipped with self-levelling as an unobtrusive, but integral design feature. The Citroën's dashboard (later console or fascia mounted controls) includes a position lever which allows the driver to select whether the car would sit with the body in high, intermediate, normal or low positions, the extremes used for maintenance such as changing wheels or hydraulic system work. Up until 1995 when they added "antisink" to the range when the engine was turned off, the suspension slowly lost pressure until the car rested on the bump stops. When the engine was restarted it rose back to its pre-selected height. The addition of anti-sink added 2 non-return valves and an extra accumulator so that when hydraulic pressure was lost the valves would close and keep the remaining fluid in the system, and leaving the car resting at a normal height when parked.

In the United States, William D. Allison developed Torsion-Level Suspension used on 1955-1956 model Packards. This was an interconnected suspension, with torsion bars that ran along each side of the frame, connecting the front wheel to the rear (on the same side). Because this system is so affected by load, a supplemental, electronic leveling system was added, which uses a level sensor and a single motor to load/unload a pair of auxiliary bars to adjust vehicle attitude, but not overall ride height. This early attempt was an important step on the road to self-leveling, even if a full load would cause the whole car to lower evenly, rather than maintain height.

In 1957, Cadillac introduced the Eldorado Brougham, a Rolls-Royce Silver Cloud competitor, featuring a new Air suspension with a self leveling feature.

In 1966, Rolls-Royce licensed Citroën's hydropneumatic system to fit to the rear axle of the Silver Shadow. At first, both the front and rear of the car were controlled by the levelling system; the front levelling was removed in 1969 as it had been determined that the rear levelling did almost all the work. Rolls-Royce achieved a high degree of ride quality with this arrangement.

Land Rover developed a different system for the Range Rover in the early 1970s. The Range Rover was intended to be as comfortable on the road as a normal saloon car yet as capable of heavy off-road use as a traditional Land Rover. This highlighted the contradiction in suspension design as the Range Rover used all-round long-travel coil springs. If these were kept soft to maintain comfort they would compress too much under a heavy payload, restricting axle travel when off-road and compromising handling. Land Rover developed a self-levelling rear suspension using the "Boge Hydromat" self-energising hydraulic strut.

Of similar construction to a hydraulic shock absorber the strut used the motion of the suspension travelling over bumps to pump itself back up to a pre-set height. It was sufficiently powerful to regain up to 85% of normal ride height with a full load over the rear axle, and had the advantage of requiring no external power source or a dedicated hydraulic system in the vehicle. The same system was applied to the Land Rover in the 1980s when these vehicles adopted the Range Rover's coil spring suspension. In the 1990s Land Rover, in pursuit of the same blend of on- and off-road ability, developed an air suspension system that was both self-levelling and height adjustable. Originally this was in conjunction with live axles but it is now used with fully independent suspension using wishbones.

BMW, Ford, GMC, Jaguar, Mercedes-Benz, Scania AB, Subaru and Volvo have each pursued numerous avenues to address this issue, including air suspension and rear axle mechanical devices.
