= 6.3 =

6.3 may refer to:

- 6.3 (song), a 2020 song by French rapper Naps, featuring Ninho
- 6.3 filename, a naming convention for filenames in 8-bit FAT under Standalone Disk BASIC
- Mercedes-Benz 300SEL 6.3, a car
