= Mercedes-Benz 450SEL 6.9 =

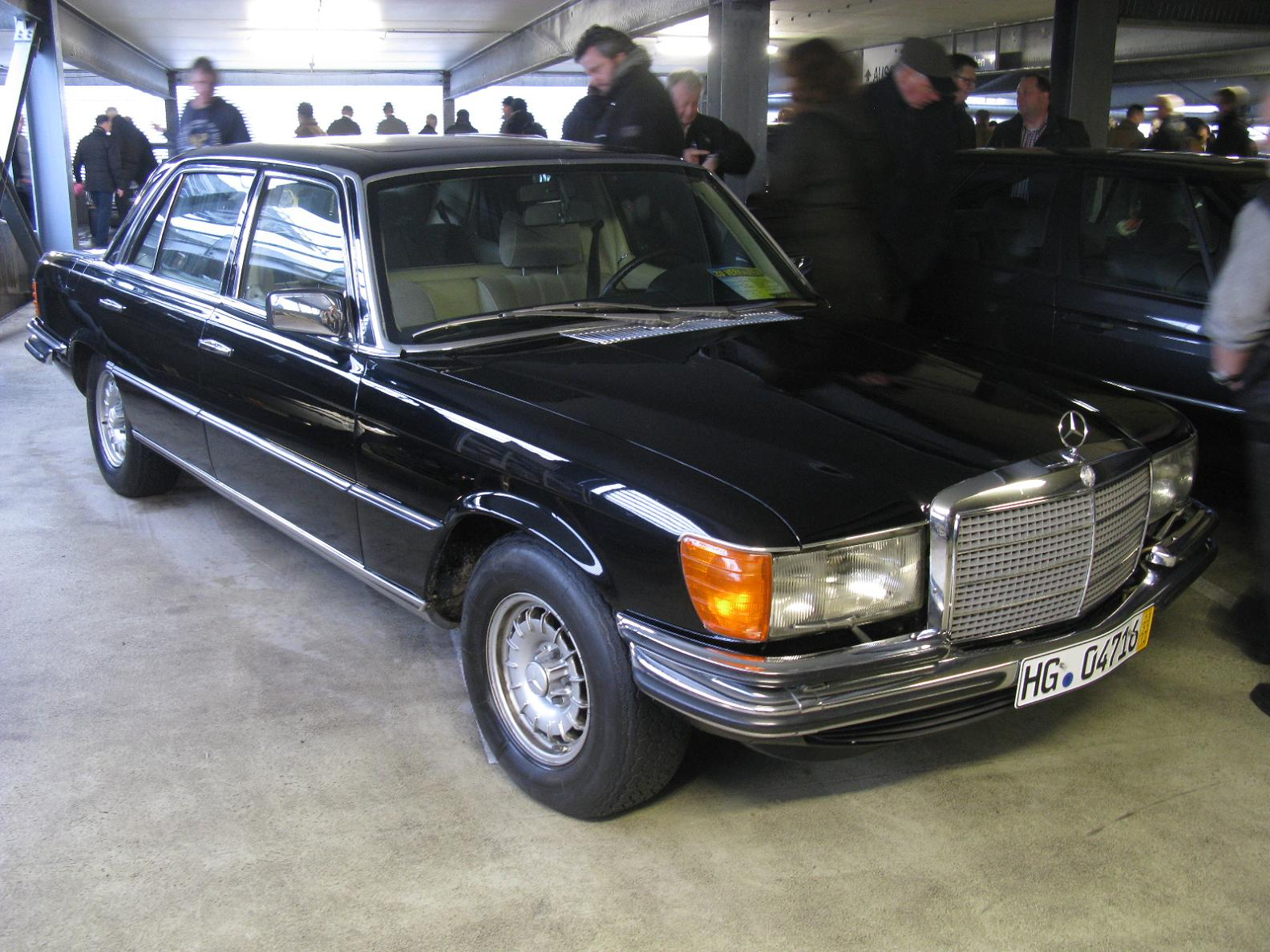

Overview
- Manufacturer: Daimler-Benz
- Also called: Mercedes-Benz 6.9 (North America)
- Production: 1975–1980; 7,380 built
- Model years: 1977–1981 (North America)
- Assembly: West Germany: Stuttgart

Body and chassis
- Class: Full-size luxury car (F)
- Body style: 4-door saloon
- Platform: Mercedes-Benz W116

Powertrain
- Engine: 6834 cc M100 V8
- Transmission: 3-speed automatic

Dimensions
- Wheelbase: 2,960 mm (116.5 in)
- Length: 5,060 mm (199.2 in); 5,335 mm (210.0 in) (US and Canada)
- Width: 1,870 mm (73.6 in)
- Height: 1,430 mm (56.3 in)
- Curb weight: 1,985 kg (4,376 lb)

Chronology
- Predecessor: Mercedes-Benz 300SEL 6.3

The Mercedes-Benz 450SEL 6.9 (marketed in North America as simply the Mercedes-Benz 6.9) is the high-performance version of the W116 S-Class saloon. It was based on the extended-wheelbase version of the W116 S-Class platform, introduced in 1972, but equipped with an M100 V8 engine from their flagship Mercedes-Benz 600, uprated to 6.8 litre engine, and featuring full hydropneumatic suspension, licensed from Citroën.

The 450SEL 6.9 was presented to the public at the Geneva Auto Show in 1974 as the successor to the original high-performance saloon from Mercedes-Benz, the 300SEL 6.3 (1968–1972). Like the 300SEL 6.3 before it, the special displacement number (6.9) was affixed to the trunk lid to differentiate itself from the regular 450SEL. The 450SEL 6.9 was produced in very limited numbers from 1975 to 1980.

The 450SEL 6.9 had the first full four-wheel hydropneumatic suspension system from Mercedes-Benz and was the world’s first passenger car to be fitted with a modern form of ABS, an electronic four-wheel multi-channel anti-lock braking system from Bosch, in 1978.

For several years, the 450SEL 6.9 was the quickest-accelerating and fastest saloon in the world, reaching 100 km/h (62 mph) in 7.4 seconds and 225 km/h (140 mph) top speed.

The total production from 1975 to 1980 was 7,380 units, with 1,816 exported to the North American markets (United States and Canada) from 1977 to 1981.

== M 100 engine ==
The 6.3-litre M 100 V8 engine, originally fitted to 600 and 300 SEL 6.3, was enlarged to 6.8 L (6,834 cc; 417.0 cu in) by boring it out to 107 mm (4.213 in). Each hand-built unit was bench-tested for 265 minutes, 40 of which were under full load. The stricter emission regulations in the mid-1970s necessitated the larger displacement as to compensate for the lowered output. The fuel injection system was upgraded to the third-generation mechanically controlled, continuous-injection system Bosch K-Jetronic.

Due to its sheer size, the engineers fitted the dry sump oil lubrication system as to lower the engine height and preserve the low hood line. The dry sump system had larger capacity at 12 litres rather than 5 litres for the wet sump system fitted to the smaller M116 and M117 V8 engines. The dipstick was moved from the engine block to the oil tank’s filler cap. The larger oil capacity extended the oil change interval to 20,000 km (12,500 miles).

For the European and international markets, the M100 engine produced 210 kW (286 PS; 282 bhp) at 4,250 rpm and 550 N⋅m (406 lb⋅ft) at 3,000 rpm. The 450 SEL 6.9 for the North American markets had the reduced output and compression ratio (8.0:1 instead of 8.8:1) and was fitted with a catalytic converter, requiring lead-free petrol: 250 hp (186 kW; 253 PS) at 4,000 rpm and 360 lb⋅ft (488 N⋅m) at 2,500 rpm. The 450 SEL 6.9 sold in Australia had slightly reduced output due to Australia's new 1977 emission regulations: 198 kW (269 PS; 266 bhp) at 4,200 rpm and 510 N⋅m (376 lb⋅ft) at 2,800 rpm.

During its entire production run, the engine displacement of 6.8 litres was the largest V8 engine ever built by Mercedes-Benz and by any European manufacturer since the Second World War.

== Suspension ==
The full hydropneumatic self-levelling suspension system from Mercedes-Benz was first introduced in 450SEL 6.9 as a standard equipment. The other W116 models used the hydropneumatic system for the rear suspension only as level control under heavy load (Option No. 48/0, "Niveauregulierung"). The full system was exclusive to 450SEL 6.9 until 1981 when the next generation, HPF II, was offered as an extra-cost option for W126 380SEL and 500SEL. The 600 and W109 used the air suspension for self-levelling.

The Mercedes-Benz system differentiated from Citroën system, introduced in 1954, in some ways. Mercedes-Benz used the timing chain to drive the hydraulic pump instead of rubber belt in Citroën system. Citroën system used a single pump to send the synthetic LHS oil (and later LHM mineral oil) to the brake boost, power steering, power clutch (when equipped with semi-automatic transmission), and hydropneumatic suspension system. Mercedes-Benz system had the separate pumps for brake boost, power steering, and hydropneumatic suspension, citing the better failsafe measures than Citroën in the event of a hydraulic failure. The Mercedes-Benz system contained the hard rubber dampers that served as temporary springs and allowed the car to be driven if the hydraulic pump or components failed. Both manufacturers had different approaches when the cars were parked and switched off. Citroën lowered themselves closer to the ground while Mercedes-Benz did not. Mercedes-Benz suspension system has the feature that maintains body level without squatting at the rear or diving in the front during the acceleration and braking respectively.

== North American market ==
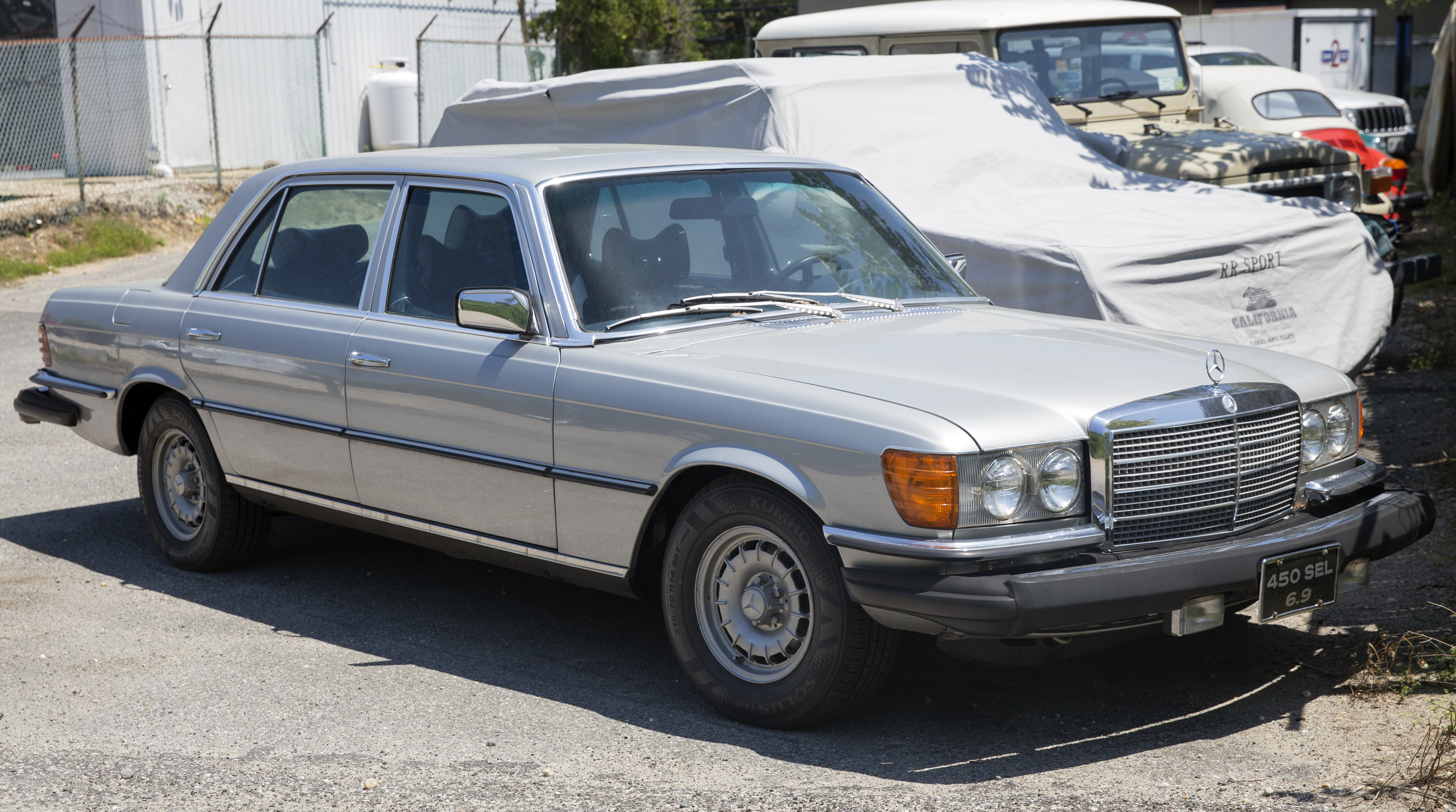
Mercedes-Benz 6.9 for US market (front view)

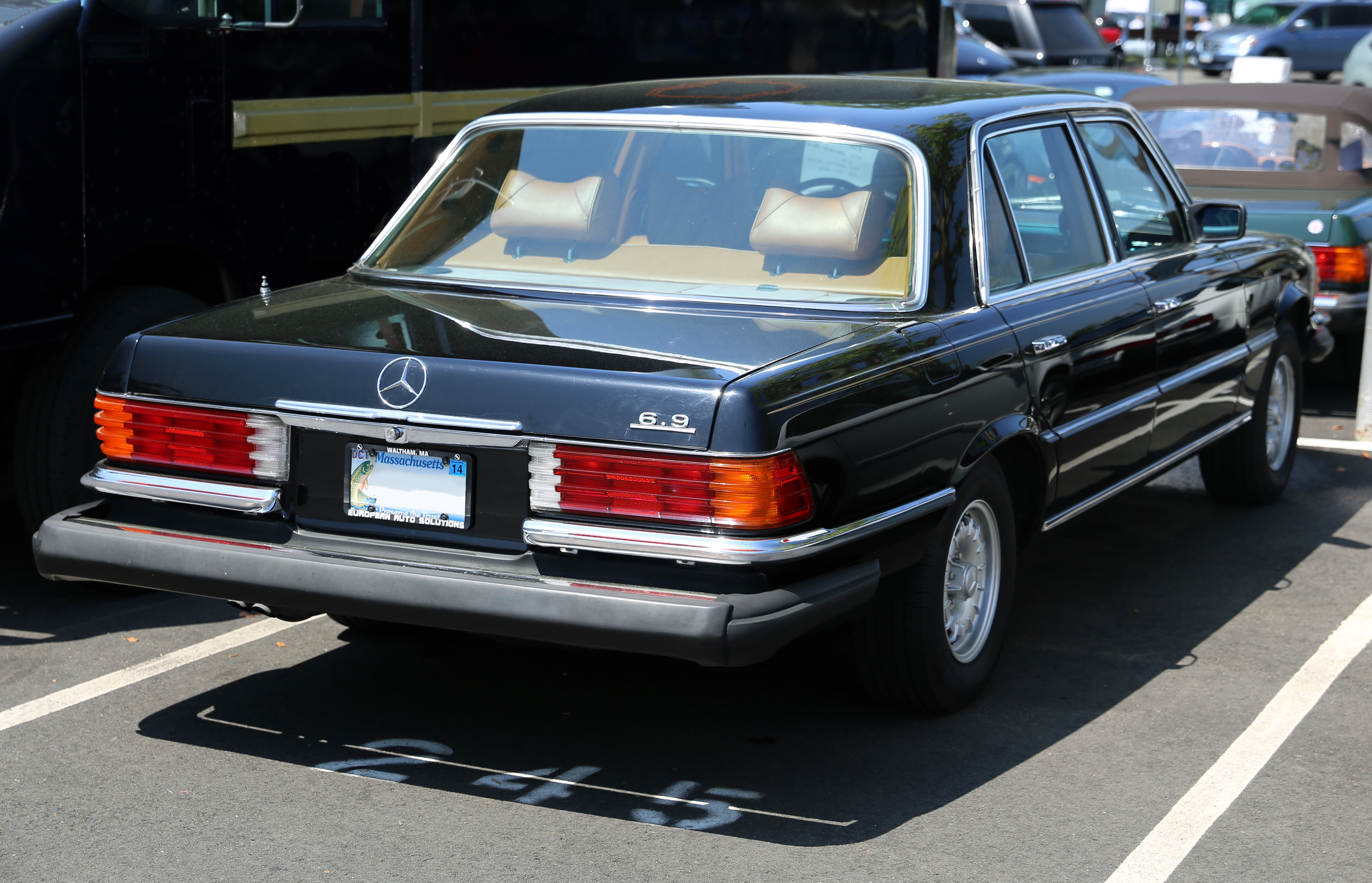
Mercedes-Benz 6.9 for US market (rear view)

Initially, Mercedes-Benz did not plan on selling the 450SEL 6.9 in the United States given the oil crisis that hit the Americans very hard and increasingly tightening emission regulations. Mercedes-Benz had difficulties in meeting the European demand. However, the strong requests from the customers and dealers reversed the decision.

The 6.9 was fitted with four sealed beam 5.75" round capsule headlights with bezels and larger impact absorbing bumpers that lengthened the car by 11 inches. Due to the US FMVSS bumper standard, the variable height suspension was disabled, and the height adjustment knob was removed. To differentiate the 6.9 from other W116 models, the bumpers had a thick black rubber strip covering their entire width, and did not feature rubber bumper guards.

The engine output was reduced to 250 hp (186 kW; 253 PS) and 360 lb⋅ft (488 N⋅m) due to the stricter emission standards.

== Price ==
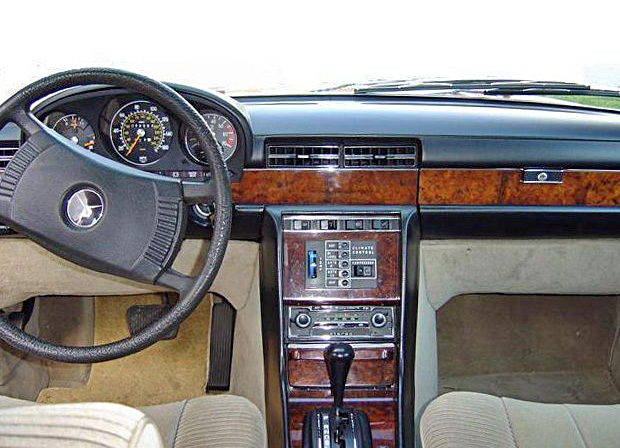
The dashboard of a Mercedes-Benz 450SEL 6.9

The retail price was DM 69,930 (equivalent to about €96,500 in January 2026) for model year 1976 after its launch in 1975 (450 SEL DM 44,444.40, or equal to about €61,400 in 2026) and was DM 81,247 (about €97,100) at the end of production in 1980.

In the North American market, the 450SEL 6.9 was called simply the 6.9 and featured the model name on the right side of the trunk lid. The retail price for the 1977 model year started at $38,230 (equal to about $203,100 in January 2026) and was increased to $52,995 ($207,100) by the end of production in 1980.

While the 450SEL 6.9 was visually indistinguishable from the other W116 models, it had wider wheels and tires along with the "6.9" badging on the right side of trunk lid. The 6.9 also received more standard features that were extra cost options in other W116 models: automatic HVAC control system, power windows, headrests for the rear passengers, central locking system, headlamp washer and wiper system, heat-insulating glass, and a few other items.

== Interior features ==
Despite the higher retail price, the interior of the 450SEL 6.9 was indistinguishable from the other W116 models except for the different type of wood trims, height adjustment knob, and two extra warning lamps in the instrument cluster for the low suspension pressure warning and height adjustment indicator. Heated seats for driver and front and rear passengers as well as electric sunroof were extra cost options. No power-assisted external rear view mirrors and seat adjustments, commonly fitted to luxury cars such as Cadillac and Rolls-Royce during the 1970s, were ever offered in the 450SEL 6.9.

The first-ever automatic HVAC system from Mercedes-Benz was introduced in the 450SEL 6.9 as a standard equipment and as optional extra-cost equipment in other W116 models. The automatic HVAC system was adapted from Chrysler Corporation and had a compressor from Harrison division of General Motors.

The 450SEL 6.9 had exclusive wood trim finished in burled walnut veneer on the dash and console instead of striated zebrano veneer as found in other W116 models.

== Cultural references ==
- After the persistent rumours, the French director Claude Lelouche revealed the car he used to drive through Paris at a very high speed to the rendezvous point at Montmartre in his eight-minute film, C'était un rendez-vous. He used a 1976 450SEL 6.9 with the camera mounted under the front bumper. He used the sound track from the Ferrari 275 GTB, giving the impression that he drove a Ferrari.
- The 450SEL 6.9 was driven by Vincent, one of the protagonists in Ronin, and was involved in several of the film's car chase scenes.
- In David Lynch's 1996 film, Lost Highway, a 450SEL 6.9 was used as a major plot device, connecting all three main male characters in the film. In one scene, the hood was lifted up to reveal the 1,400-horsepower engine modification. In another scene, the car was used to push a Ford Thunderbird off the road despite the latter applying the brakes.
- The Mercedes-Benz 450SEL 6.9 is referenced in George Harrison's 1976 song "It's What You Value" from his album Thirty Three & 1/3. The lyrics mention "Someone's driving a 450," alluding to the 450SEL 6.9 as a symbol of personal values and status. Harrison later confirmed in interviews that he had paid drummer Jim Keltner for his session work not with money, but with a 450SEL 6.9.

== Technical data ==
Technical data
Specifications
Engine	V8, two single overhead camshafts (SOHC), five main bearings
Bore × stroke	107.0 mm (4.213 in) × 95.0 mm (3.740 in)
Displacement	6,834 cc (417.0 cu in)
Fuel Delivery	Bosch K-Jetronic fuel injection
Compression ratio	8.8:1 (European); 8.0:1 (US)
Net power	286 PS (210 kW; 282 bhp) at 4,250 rpm (International); 250 bhp (186 kW; 253 PS) at 4,000 rpm (US); 198 kW (269 PS; 266 bhp) at 4,200 rpm (Australia)
Net torque	56 kp⋅m (549 N⋅m; 405 lb⋅ft) at 3,000 rpm (International); 360 lb⋅ft (488 N⋅m; 50 kp⋅m) at 2,500 rpm (US); 510 N⋅m (376 lb⋅ft; 52 kp⋅m) at 2,800 rpm (Australia)
Maximum engine speed	5300 rpm
Transmission	Three-speed automatic with torque converter
Rear axle ratio	$\tfrac {45} {17} \ \approxeq \$ 2.6471
Dimensions
Curb weight	1,935 kg (4,266 lb) (International) · 4,390 lb (1,991 kg) (US)
Wheelbase	2,960 mm (116.54 in)
Track front · rear	1,521 mm (59.88 in) · 1,505 mm (59.25 in)
Overall length	5,060 mm (199.21 in) (International) · 5,335 mm (210 in) (US)
Width	1,870 mm (73.62 in)
Height	1,410 mm (56 in)
Trunk (boot) capacity	520 L (18.4 cu ft)
Steering, Brakes, and Wheels
Steering type	recirculating ball, power
Turns, lock-to-lock	3.0
Turning circle	12.1 m (39.7 ft)
Tires	Michelin XWX 215/70 VR 14 steel-belted radial
Wheels	6.5 J × 14
Braking system	Dual-circuit, power-assisted hydraulic, ventilated front disc, non-ventilated rear disc
Total swept brake area	2,945 cm^{2} (456.5 sq in)
Braking 110–0 km/h (70–0 mph)	63 m (207 ft)
Fuel
Fuel tank capacity	96 L (25.4 US gal; 21.1 imp gal)
Fuel Consumption	16.0 L/100 km (17.7 mpg_{‑imp}; 14.7 mpg_{‑US}) combined 23.5 L/100 km (12.0 mpg_{‑imp}; 10.0 mpg_{‑US}) city 16.8 L/100 km (16.8 mpg_{‑imp}; 14.0 mpg_{‑US}) highway (US EPA cycle)
Accommodations
Head Room	980 mm (38.6 in) Front; 942 mm (37.1 in) Rear
Leg Room	1,060 mm (41.7 in) Front; 967 mm (38.1 in) Rear
Hip Room	1,460 mm (57.5 in) Front; 1,510 mm (59.4 in) Rear
Shoulder Room	1,400 mm (55.1 in) Front; 1,394 mm (54.9 in) Rear
Performance
Acceleration 0-100 km/h · 0-60 mph	7.4 seconds · 7.2 seconds
Top speed	225 km/h (140 mph)

== Units sold ==
Units sold
Year	Total	Thereof North America
1975	474	0
1976	1475	0
1977	1798	462
1978	1665	437
1979	1839	576
1980	129	317
1981	4	0
Total	7380	1816
