= Mercedes-Benz 600 (disambiguation) =

The Mercedes-Benz 600 was a large luxury automobile offered in several variants worldwide.

Mercedes-Benz 600 may also refer to:

- 1964–1981 Mercedes-Benz W100 (600 & 600 Pullman)
- 1992–1994 Mercedes-Benz W140 (600SEL, 600SEC, S600, CL600)
- 1993–2000 Mercedes-Benz R129 (600SL, SL600)
- 2000 Mercedes-Benz W220 (S600)
- 2000 Mercedes-Benz C215 (CL600)
- 2001 Mercedes-Benz R230 (SL600)
