= Mercedes-Benz W116 =

Luxury motor vehicle from 1972

Mercedes-Benz W 116/V 116
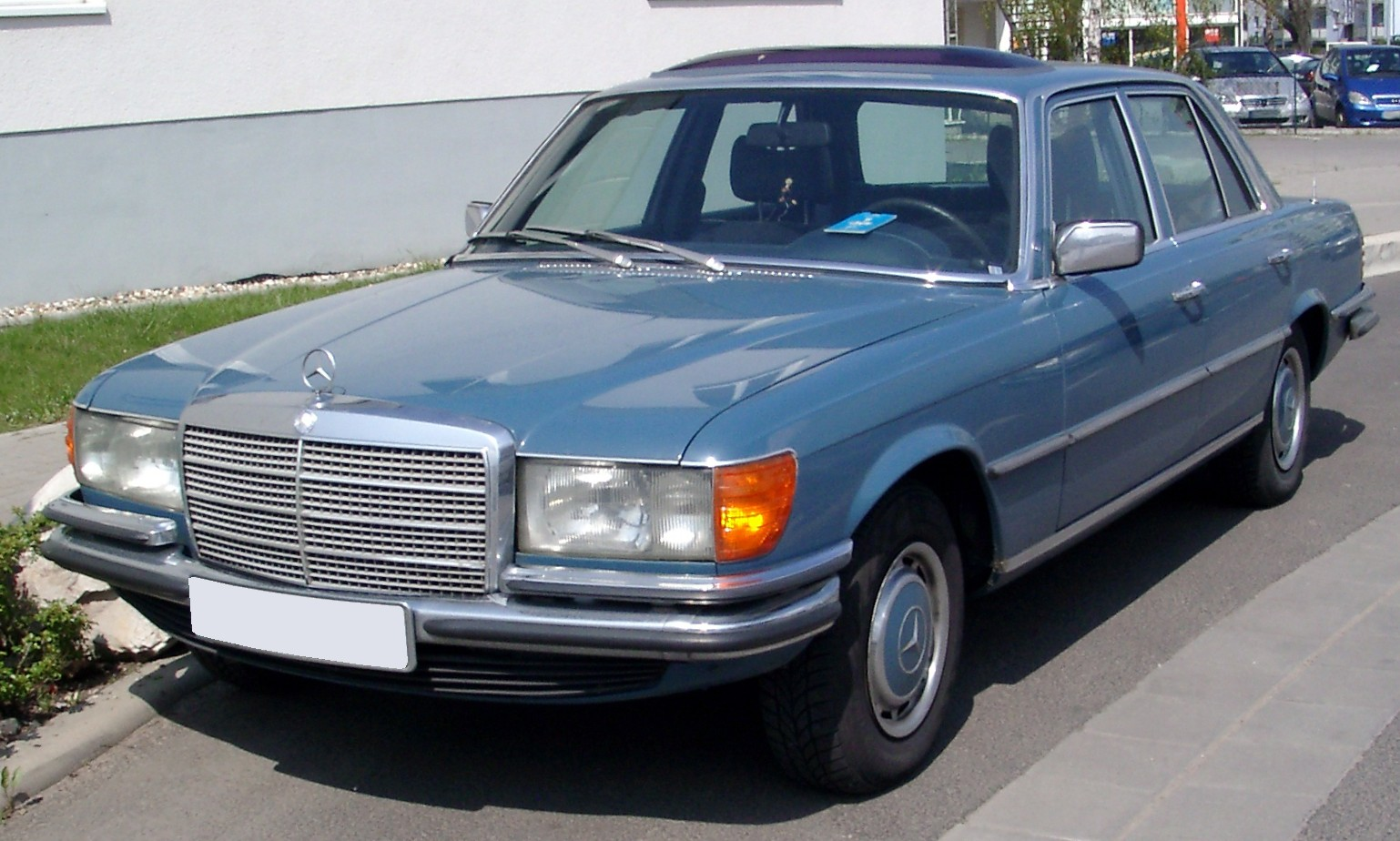

Overview
- Manufacturer: Daimler-Benz
- Production: 1972–1980
- Model years: 1973–1980
- Assembly: West Germany: Sindelfingen; South Africa: East London; Venezuela: Barcelona (CKD)
- Designer: Friedrich Geiger (1969)

Body and chassis
- Class: Full-size luxury car (F)
- Body style: 4-door saloon
- Layout: FR layout
- Related: Mercedes-Benz R107; Mercedes-Benz W123

Powertrain
- Engine: 2.8 L M 110 I6; 3.5 L M 116 V8; 4.5 L M 117 V8; 6.8 L M 100 V8; 3.0 L OM 617 turbodiesel I5
- Transmission: 3-speed 722.0 automatic 4-speed 722.1 automatic 4-speed manual 5-speed manual

Dimensions
- Wheelbase: 2,865 mm (112.8 in); 2,965 mm (116.7 in) (SEL)
- Length: 4,960 mm (195.3 in); 5,060 mm (199.2 in) (SEL); 5,220 mm (205.5 in) (SE US bumpers); 5,334 mm (210.0 in) (SEL US bumpers)
- Width: 1,870 mm (73.6 in)
- Height: 1,410 mm (55.5 in) & 1,430 mm (56.3 in)
- Curb weight: 1,650–1,955 kg (3,637.6–4,310.0 lb)

Chronology
- Predecessor: Mercedes-Benz W108
- Successor: Mercedes-Benz W126

The Mercedes-Benz W 116 is a series of flagship luxury saloons produced from September 1972 until 1980. The W 116 automobiles were the first Mercedes-Benz models to be officially called S-Class, although some earlier saloon models had already been designated unofficially with the letter S for "special class" (German: "Sonderklasse"). The W 116 was selected as European Car of the Year in 1974.

== History ==
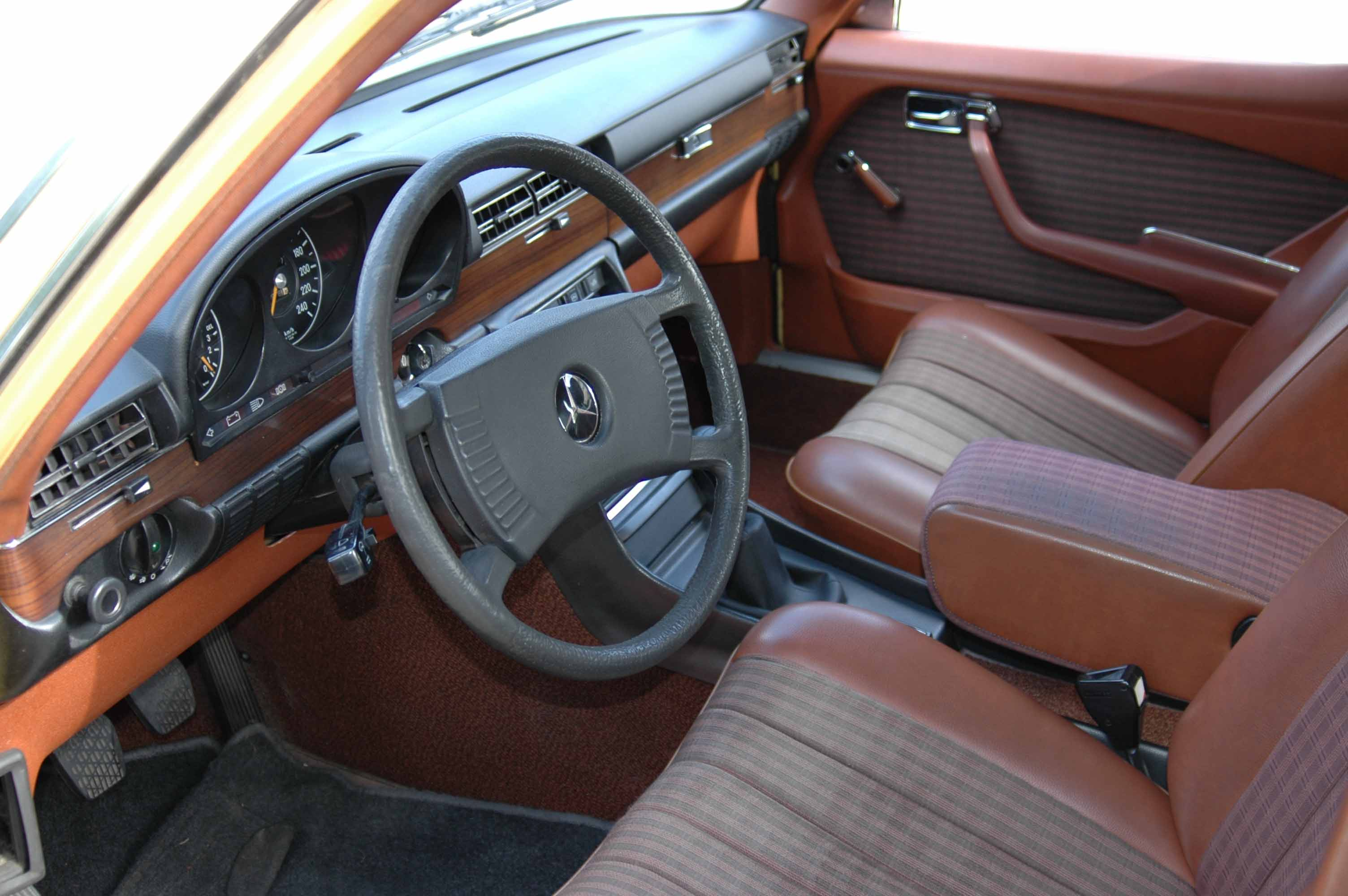
1975 Mercedes-Benz 350 SE interior

=== New rear suspension ===
The W 116 is the first S-Class, to use the same engineering as the W 114/W 115, but used a larger, separate platform. The S-Class from 1965 and "Pagoda" SL from 1963 would be the last of the low-pivot swing axle and king pin/double wishbone front ends.

The W 114 and W 115 models from 1968 are the first post-war Mercedes-Benz production cars to use a new suspension design. The semi-trailing rear arm and ball-joint front end format first displayed in the W 114/W 115 would be used in all new Mercedes passenger car models until the development of the multi-link rear suspensions of the 1980s.

The W 116 has independent suspension and disk brakes on all four wheels.

=== New corporate styling theme ===
The W 116's development began in 1966, which was only a year after the launch of the W 108/W 109. This is the first Mercedes-Benz saloon to feature the brand-new corporate styling theme, which endured until 1997, when the W 140 was discontinued. The design, finalized in December 1969, was a dramatic leap forward, with an elegant and sporty character. The basic design concept continued the themes originally introduced on the R 107 SL-Class roadster, especially the front and rear lights. As with the SL, the W 116 received the ridged lamp covers which keeps dirt accumulation at bay; this was to remain a Mercedes-Benz design theme into the 21st century. The W 116 was Friedrich Geiger's last design for Mercedes-Benz; his career had started with the Mercedes-Benz 500K in 1933.

=== 1972: 2.8 L 6-cylinder and 3.5 L V8 engines ===
The W 116 was presented in September 1972. The model range initially included two versions of the M 110 engine (straight-six with 2746 cc displacement) — the 280 S (using a Solex carburetor) and the 280 SE (using Bosch D-Jetronic injection), plus the 350 SE, powered by the M 116 engine (V8 with 3499 cc displacement). After the 1973 oil crisis, a long-wheelbase 280 SEL was added to the model range.

=== 1973: 4.5 L V8 engine ===
The larger 4.5-litre M 117 V8 engines were developed in response to US emission regulations and initially fitted to the 350 SL and 350 SLC for the US market in 1972, which were renamed as the 450 SL and 450 SLC in 1973. Mercedes-Benz introduced the 450 SE and 450 SEL for both US and international markets in 1973. The 4.5-litre models were available with three-speed automatic gearboxes only, while the models with smaller 3.5-litre V8 engine could be ordered with a four-speed manual gearbox. The 450 SE and 450 SEL received a plusher interior, with velour or leather seats rather than the checkered cloth of the lesser models. The door cards had the velour or leather inserts.

The 4.5-litre M 117 V8 engines had 225 PS (165 kW) in most European and international markets, 190 hp (142 kW) for the US market, and 200 PS (147 kW; 197 hp) for Swedish and Australian markets. The 450 models received a plusher interior as well, with velour or leather seats rather than the checkered cloth of the lesser models. The door cards were also of a different design, with pads being pulled up around the windows.

=== 1975: 6.8 L V8 engine ===
The most notable W 116 model was the high-performance 450 SEL 6.9, which was introduced in 1975. This model boasted the largest engine installed in a post-war Mercedes-Benz (and any non-American production automobile) up to that time, and it also featured self-leveling hydropneumatic suspension.

=== 1978: 3.0 L 5-cylinder turbocharged diesel engine ===
Exclusive to the North American and Japanese markets was the 300 SD TURBO DIESEL, the world's first passenger car with a turbocharged diesel engine, which was introduced in 1978. No 300 SD TURBO DIESEL model was offered in Europe (where diesel engines were well-received and had tax advantages) until 1991, when the W 140 300 SD was finally introduced in Europe and international markets.

=== Production data ===
The 450 SE was named the European Car of the Year in 1974, even though the W 116 range was first introduced at the Paris Motor Show in the fall of 1972.

Production totaled 473,035 units. The W 116 was succeeded by the W 126 S-Class in 1979. The W 116 was sold throughout Europe, the Americas, Asia, the Middle East, Africa, and Australia.

== Fuel injection ==
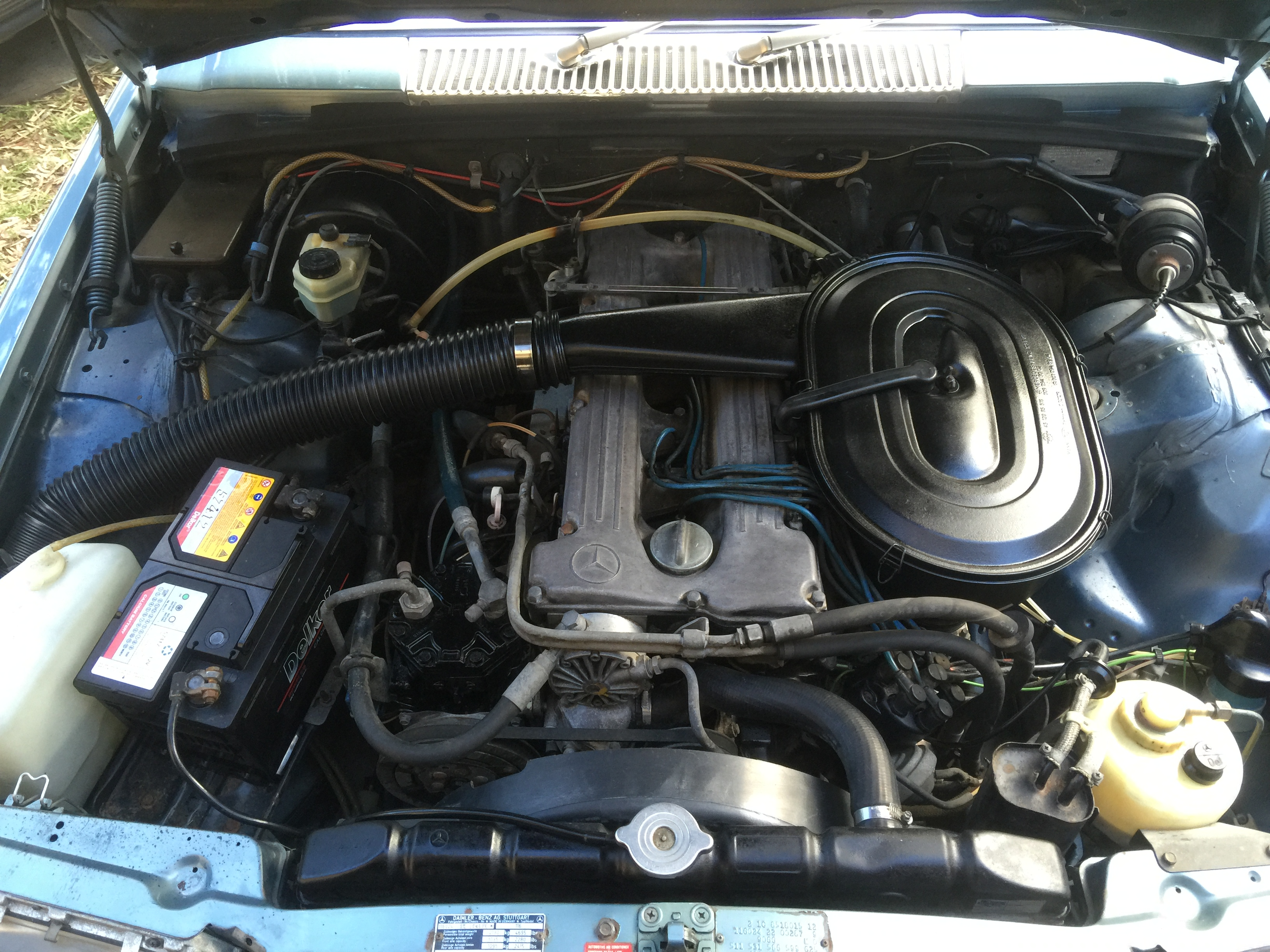
1978 M 110 Engine, twin cam inline 6 (2.8 litre) with Bosch K-Jetronic fuel injection. The left cam drives the pump for the hydraulic self-leveling rear suspension.

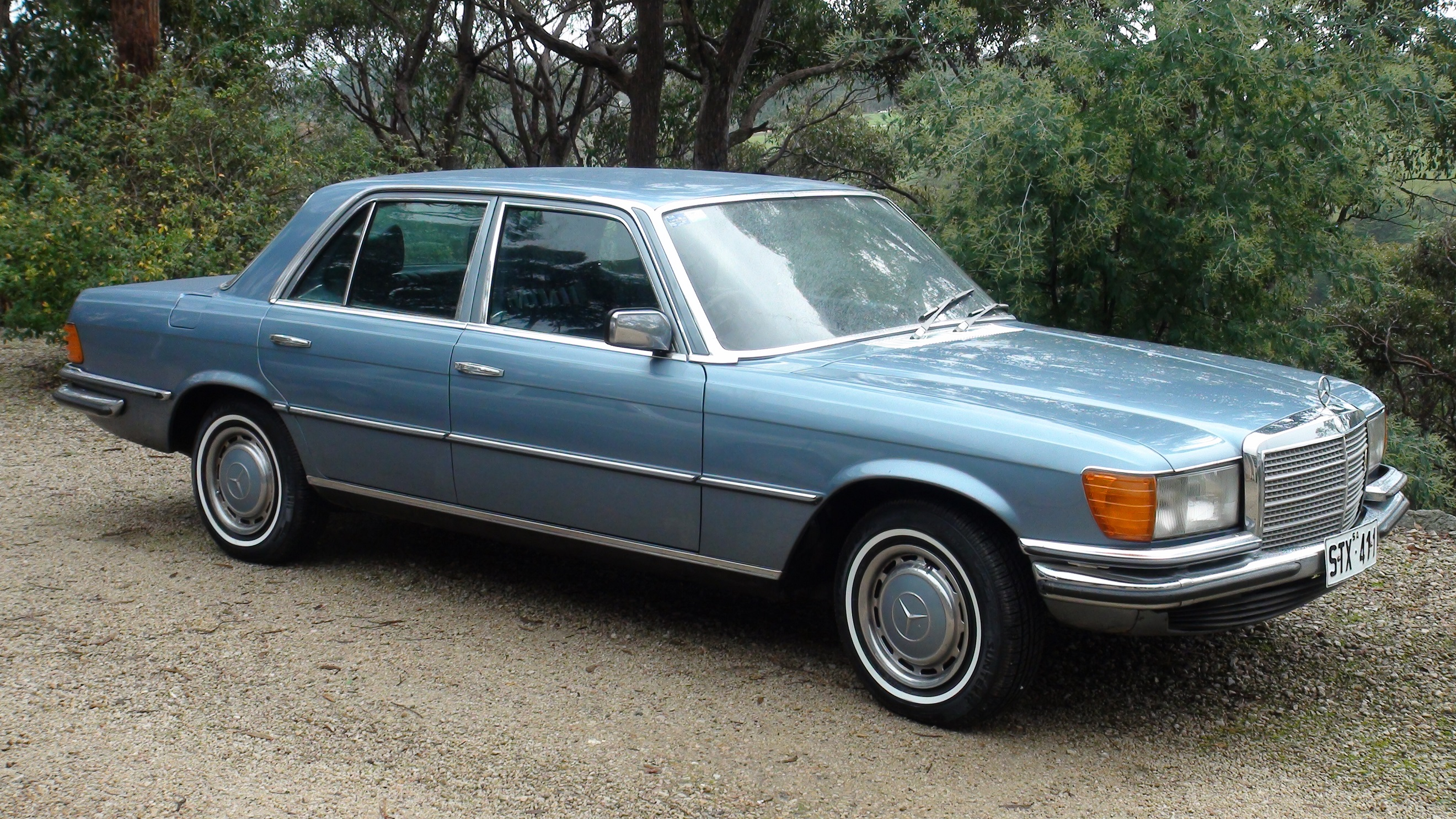
1978 Mercedes Benz 280 SE (Australian delivered) in 906 Graublau metallic (Grey Blue metallic)

In 1975, the W 116 was upgraded with a new fuel injection system to comply with revised exhaust emission standards in European markets. A slight power reduction was a result of this update. In 1978, a series of engine upgrades restored original performance levels with new fuel injection systems. The D-Jetronic fuel injection system fitted to the early 280 SE (1973–1974) had computers and MAP sensor that are prone to failure after more than 20 years of use. From 1975 onward they used the K-Jetronic mechanical fuel injection system, a less complicated system that proved to be much more reliable in the long run with injectors costing significantly less than those used on the D-Jetronic system. The W 116 equipped with the K-Jetronic system used a cast-iron fuel distributor which can be prone to rust over time if moisture or water is present in the fuel. This was changed to an alloy fuel distributor in the following model W 126 and is not subject to corrosion.

== Hydropneumatic suspension ==
W 116 was the first model from Mercedes-Benz to feature the hydropneumatic suspension system. While the principle is similar to Citroën's, Mercedes-Benz made some changes. The hydraulic pump was driven by the timing chain instead of a rubber belt for more reliability (Citroën's system would lead to loss of hydraulic power if the belt failed). Mercedes-Benz utilised the hard rubber dampers as temporary dampers in event of hydraulic failure. The height adjustment had a smaller range of height as compared to Citroën (40 mm versus 50 mm). Unlike Citroën, the car did not “sink” to the ground after shutting off the engine, and the driver did not have to wait for the hydraulic power to spool up and lift the car to the operating height.

The full hydropneumatic suspension system was fitted to the 450 SEL 6.9 as standard. In 1977, the self-levelling rear suspension system was offered for 450 SEL as an extra cost option outside the North American market.

== North American sales ==
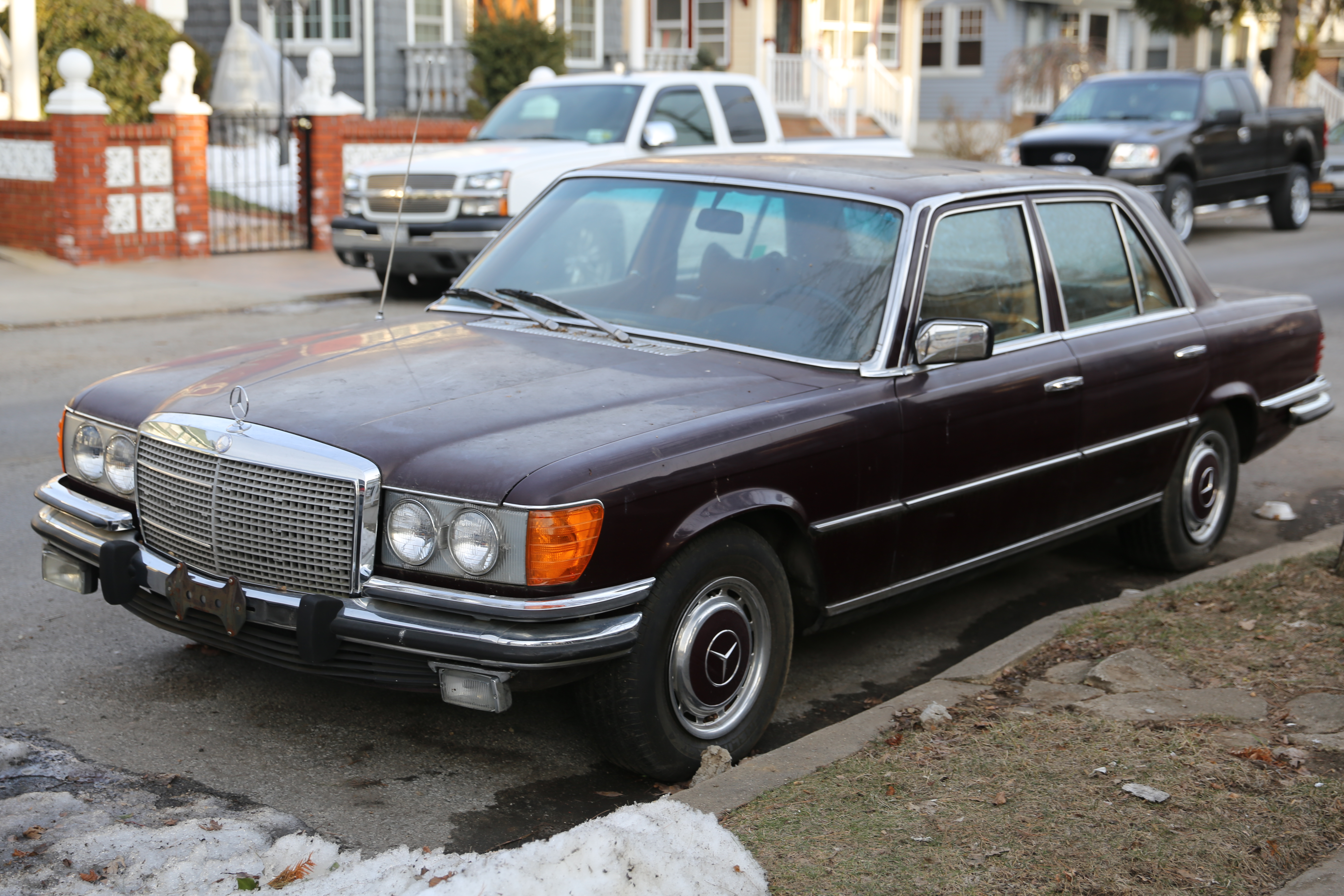
Mercedes-Benz 450 SE (United States)

North America was a key market for the W 116. The model range for the U.S. market for 1973 was 450 SE and 450 SEL. Initially both models were unique to the US market, carrying on the tradition of the 4.5 litre W 108/W 109 versions they replaced (and would become available in Europe only in early 1973). For 1975, the 280 S was launched as a response to the 1973 oil crisis. For 1977, the 280 S and 450 SE were dropped due to slow sales and replaced with the 280 SE. The 6.9 was added for 1978 with the MSRP of $38,230 and continued to be sold until 1980.

=== Malaise era ===
Due to the series of new U.S. federal safety and emission regulations in the 1970s, the W 116 were described by journalists as if a "beautiful car was beaten with the malaise ugly stick." Furthermore, the performance was being continuously hampered by the increasingly stringent emission control and fuel economy legislation. Upon launch, the M 117 engine for the US market developed a SAE net rating of 192 hp (143 kW; 195 PS) at 4750 rpm and 325 N⋅m (240 lb⋅ft) at 3000 rpm for a car with curb weight of 1,743 kg (3,843 lb) (450 SEL - 1,755 kg (3,869 lb)). In the final 1980 model year, the 450 SEL was producing 162 hp (121 kW; 164 PS) at 4200 rpm and 312 N⋅m (230 lb⋅ft) at 2500 rpm, weighing 1,810 kg (3,990 lb) (international model 225 PS (165 kW; 222 hp) at 5000 rpm, 37.5 kp⋅m (368 N⋅m; 271 lb⋅ft) at 3250 rpm, 1,765 kg (3,891 lb)).

== 300 SD Turbodiesel ==
The 300 SD "TURBO DIESEL", the world's first passenger car with a turbocharged diesel engine, was launched in the United States and Canada in 1978. It had a 3.0-litre turbocharged inline-five diesel engine developed from the C111 experimental vehicle. The 300 SD became a best seller and helped considerably raise Mercedes-Benz's Corporate Average Fuel Economy (CAFE). Mercedes-Benz would make S-Class models with the turbocharged diesel engines exclusively for the North American and Japanese markets until 1992.

== 450 SEL 6.9 ==
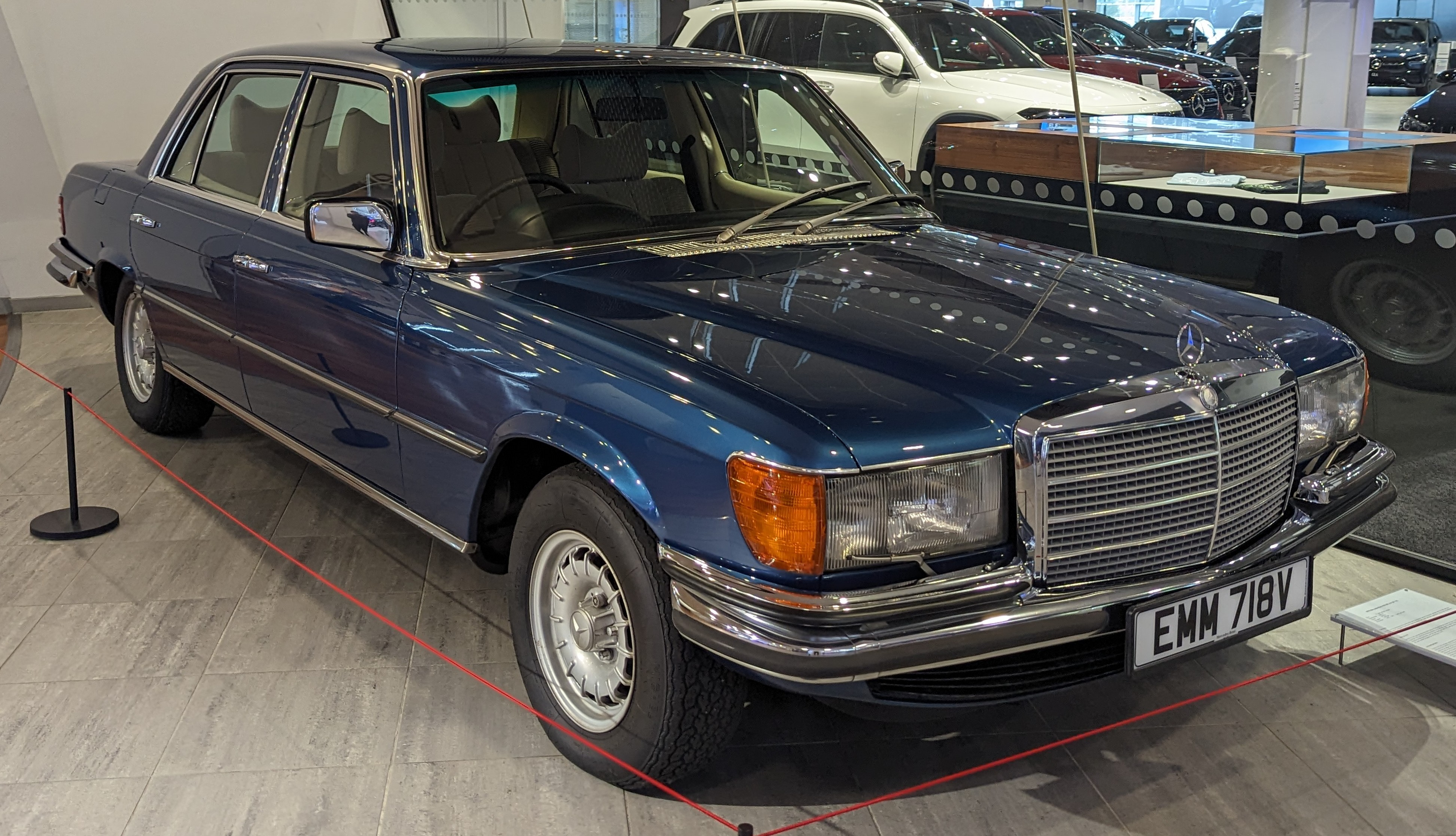
Mercedes-Benz 450 SEL 6.9 for rest of world

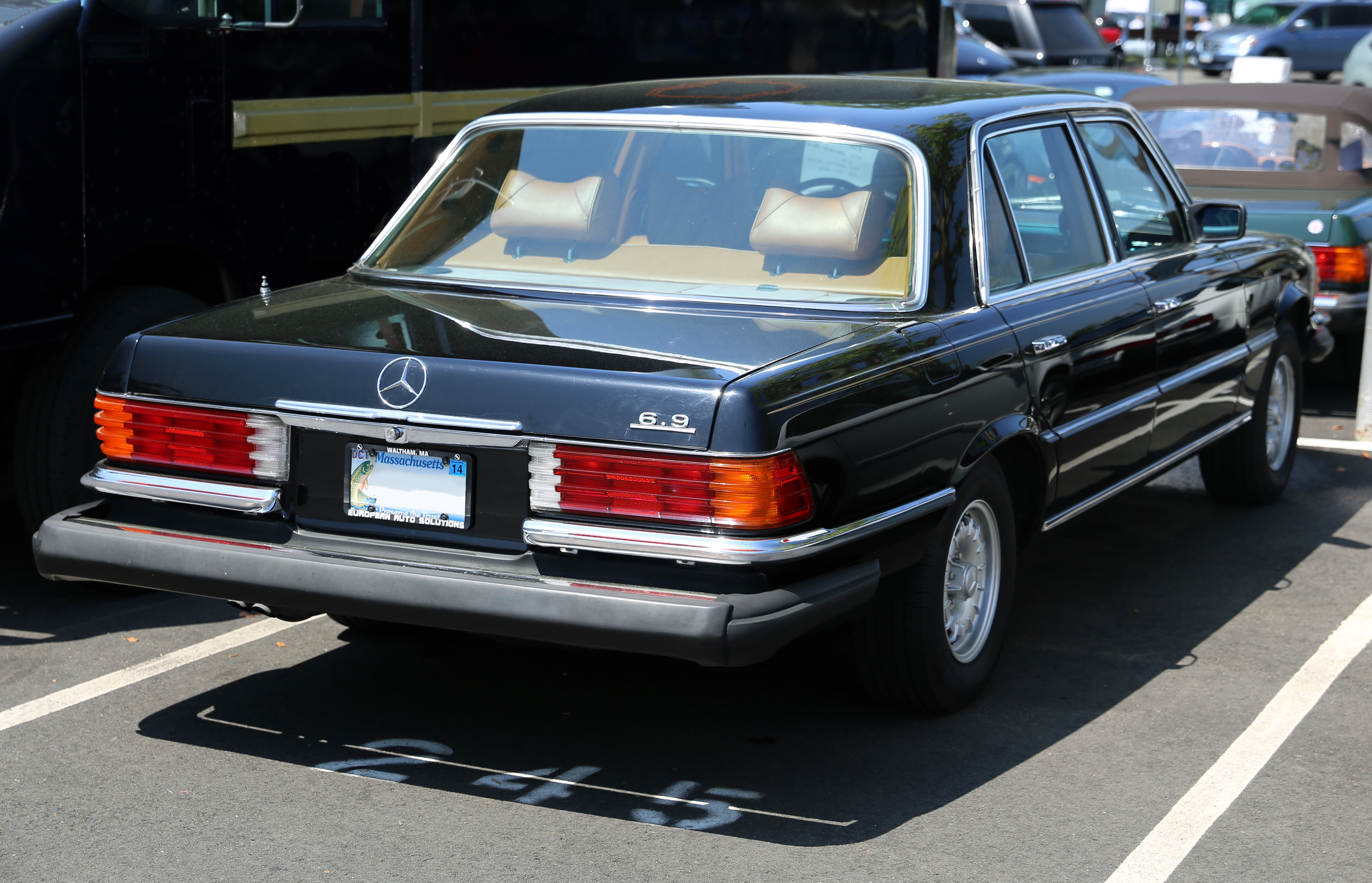
450 SEL 6.9 for North America

The high-performance 450 SEL 6.9 version of the S-Class was built on its own assembly line by Daimler-Benz in Sindelfingen, Germany and based on the long-wheelbase version of the W 116 chassis. The model was generally referred to in the company's literature as the "450 SEL 6.9" but simply "6.9" for the US market. Despite the model designation, the actual engine displacement is 6.8 litres.

The 450 SEL 6.9 was first shown to the motoring press at the Geneva Auto Show in 1974 and produced between 1975 and 1980. It was billed as the flagship of the Mercedes-Benz car line and the successor to Mercedes-Benz's original high-performance sedan, the 300 SEL 6.3.

== Technical data ==
Technical data Mercedes-Benz W 116 (Manufacturer's figures except where stated)
Model	300 SD	280 S	280 SE 280 SEL	350 SE 350 SEL	450 SE 450 SEL	450 SEL 6.9
Type	W 116 D 30 A	W 116 V28	W 116 E 28; V 116 E 28	W 116 E 35; V 116 E 35	W 116 E 45; V 116 E 45	V 116 E 69
Chassis Code	116.120	116.020	116.024; 116.025	116.028; 116.029	116.032; 116.033	116.036
Production Period	05.1978–09.1980	09.1972–07.1980	09.1972–07.1980; 04.1974−05.1980	08.1972–09.1980; 11.1973−06.1980	12.1972–04.1980; 02.1973–06.1980	09.1975–05.1980
Units Built	28,634	122,848	150,593; 7,032	51,100; 4,266	41,604; 59,578	7,380
Engine	OM 617 D 30 A	M 110 V 28	M 110 E 28	M 116 E 35	M 117 E 45	M 100 E 69
Configuration	Front-engine design, four-stroke					
Configuration	Straight-five engine	Straight-six engine		90° V8 engine		
Bore × Stroke	91.0 mm (3.583 in) × 92.4 mm (3.638 in)	86.0 mm (3.386 in) × 78.8 mm (3.102 in)		92.0 mm (3.622 in) × 65.8 mm (2.591 in)	92.0 mm (3.622 in) × 85.0 mm (3.346 in)	107.0 mm (4.213 in) × 95.0 mm (3.740 in)
Displacement	3,005 cc (183.4 cu in)	2,746 cc (167.6 cu in)		3,499 cc (213.5 cu in)	4,520 cc (275.8 cu in)	6,834 cc (417.0 cu in)
Valvetrain	Duplex chain					
Valvetrain	SOHC	DOHC		SOHC		
Cooling System	Water					
Electrical System	12 volt					
As of		09.1972		08.1972	12.1972	
Engine Code		110.922	110.983	116.983	117.983	
Fuel Feed		One 2-bbl Solex 4A1	Bosch D-Jetronic			
Compression Ratio		9.0 : 1		9.5 : 1	8.8 : 1	
Max. Power		160 PS (118 kW; 158 hp); USA: 120 hp (89 kW; 122 PS)	185 PS (136 kW; 182 hp); USA: 142 hp (106 kW; 144 PS)	200 PS (147 kW; 197 hp)	225 PS (165 kW; 222 hp); USA: 190 hp (142 kW; 193 PS)	
at		5,500rpm 4,800rpm	6,000rpm 5,750rpm	5,800rpm	5,000rpm 4,750rpm	
Max. Torque		23 kp⋅m (226 N⋅m; 166 lb⋅ft); USA: 143 lb⋅ft (194 N⋅m)	24.3 kp⋅m (238 N⋅m; 176 lb⋅ft); USA: 149 lb⋅ft (202 N⋅m)	29.2 kp⋅m (286 N⋅m; 211 lb⋅ft)	38.5 kp⋅m (378 N⋅m; 278 lb⋅ft); USA: 240 lb⋅ft (325 N⋅m)	
at		4,000rpm	4,500rpm	4,000rpm	3,000rpm	
As of	05.1978	01.1976	02.1976	01.1976	11.1975	09.1975
Engine Code	617.950	unchanged	110.985	116.985	117.986	100.985
Fuel Feed	Bosch injection pump Garrett turbine	unchanged	Bosch K-Jetronic			
Compression Ratio	21,5 : 1	8.7 : 1		9.0 : 1	8.8 : 1	
Max. Power	110 hp (82 kW; 112 PS)	156 PS (115 kW; 154 hp)	177 PS (130 kW; 175 hp)	195 PS (143 kW; 192 hp)	217 PS (160 kW; 214 hp)	286 PS (210 kW; 282 hp); USA: 250 hp (186 kW; 253 PS)
at	4,200rpm	5,500rpm	6,000rpm	5,500rpm	5,000rpm	4,250rpm USA: 4,000rpm
Max. Torque	23.2 kp⋅m (228 N⋅m; 168 lb⋅ft)	22.7 kp⋅m (223 N⋅m; 164 lb⋅ft)	23.8 kp⋅m (233 N⋅m; 172 lb⋅ft)	28 kp⋅m (275 N⋅m; 203 lb⋅ft)	36.7 kp⋅m (360 N⋅m; 265 lb⋅ft)	56 kp⋅m (549 N⋅m; 405 lb⋅ft); USA: 360 lb⋅ft (488 N⋅m)
at	2,400rpm	4,000rpm	4,500rpm	4,000rpm	3,250rpm	3,000rpm USA: 3,000rpm
As of	10.1979	04.1978				
Bore × Stroke	90.9 mm (3.579 in) × 92.4 mm (3.638 in)	unchanged	unchanged			unchanged
Displacement	2,998 cc (182.9 cu in)	unchanged	unchanged			unchanged
Max. Power	120 hp (89 kW; 122 PS)	unchanged	185 PS (136 kW; 182 hp)	205 PS (151 kW; 202 hp)	225 PS (165 kW; 222 hp); USA: 162 hp (121 kW; 164 PS)	unchanged
at	4,350rpm	unchanged	5,800rpm	5,750rpm	5,000rpm 4,250rpm	unchanged
Max. Torque	23.5 kp⋅m (230 N⋅m; 170 lb⋅ft)	unchanged	24.5 kp⋅m (240 N⋅m; 177 lb⋅ft)	29 kp⋅m (284 N⋅m; 210 lb⋅ft)	37.5 kp⋅m (368 N⋅m; 271 lb⋅ft); USA: 240 lb⋅ft (325 N⋅m)	unchanged
at	2,400rpm	unchanged	4,500rpm	4,000rpm	3,000rpm USA: 2,500rpm	unchanged
Gearbox	4-speed automatic w/ column or floor shifter	4-speed manual w/ column or floor shifter			3-speed automatic w/ column or floor shifter	
Gearbox	4-speed automatic w/ column or floor shifter	optional 5-speed manual or 4-speed automatic both w/ column or floor shifter		optional 3-speed automatic w/ column or floor shifter	3-speed automatic w/ column or floor shifter	
Automatic Gearbox: Model (Type)	W4B 025 (722.1)			W3A 040 (722.0)	W3B 050 (722.0) (worldwide); W3A 040 (722.0) (USA & Japan)	W3B 050 reinf. (722.0)
Final Ratio	$\tfrac{43} {14} \ \approxeq \$ 3.071	$\tfrac{48} {13} \ \approxeq \$ 3.692		$\tfrac{45} {13} \ \approxeq \$ 3.462	$\tfrac{43} {14} \ \approxeq \$ 3.071	$\tfrac{45} {17} \ \approxeq \$ 2.647
Body Structure	Sheet steel, unibody (monocoque)					
Length	SD · SE: 4,960 mm (195.3 in) · with US bumpers: 5,220 mm (205.5 in); SEL: 5,060 mm (199.2 in) · with US bumpers: 5,334 mm (210.0 in)					
Width	1,870 mm (73.6 in)					
Height	1,410 mm (55.5 in); 1,430 mm (56.3 in)					
Curb Weight	1,815 kg (4,001 lb)	1,660 kg (3,660 lb); USA: 3,770 lb (1,710 kg)	SE: 1,665 kg (3,671 lb); SEL: 1,700 kg (3,748 lb); USA: 3,750 lb (1,701 kg)	SE: 1,725 kg (3,803 lb); SEL: 1,760 kg (3,880 lb)	SE: 1,740 kg (3,836 lb); SEL: 1,825 kg (4,023 lb); USA: 3,843 lb (1,743 kg)	1,985 kg (4,376 lb); USA: 4,285 lb (1,944 kg)
Loaded Weight	2,215 kg (4,883 lb)	2,130 kg (4,696 lb)	SE: 2,130 kg (4,696 lb); SEL: 2,165 kg (4,773 lb)	SE: 2,195 kg (4,839 lb); SEL: 2,220 kg (4,894 lb)	SE: 2,250 kg (4,960 lb); SEL: 2,285 kg (5,038 lb)	2,420 kg (5,335 lb)
Wheelbase	SD · SE: 2,865 mm (112.8 in); SEL: 2,965 mm (116.7 in)				SE: 2,860 mm (112.6 in); SEL: 2,960 mm (116.5 in)	
Track Front · Rear	1,521 mm (59.9 in) · 1,505 mm (59.3 in)					
Front Suspension	Independent, double wishbones, torsion anti-roll bar, anti-dive device					
Front Suspension	Coil and additional rubber springs					Hydropneumatic
Rear Suspension	Independent, semi-trailing arm ("diagonal swing axle"), torsion anti-roll bar					
Rear Suspension	—				Anti-squat device	
Rear Suspension	Coil and additional rubber springs					Hydropneumatic
Brakes	Disc brakes (Ø 278 mm front, 279 mm rear), power assisted, from 1979 on request ABS					
Steering	Recirculating ball steering, servo-assisted					
Tyre/Tire Sizes	185 HR 14			205/70 VR 14		215/70 VR 14
Acceleration 0–100 km/h (0-62 mph)	17.0 s 16.2 s (Note: Acceleration and top speed as of 10.1979)	11.5 s	SE: 10.5 s SEL: 11.0 s	SE: 9.5 s SEL: 10.0 s	SE: 8.5 s SEL: 8.9 s	7.4 s
Top Speed	165 km/h (103 mph); 170 km/h (106 mph)	190 km/h (118 mph); 185 km/h (115 mph) (Note: Top speed: with automatic transmission)	200 km/h (124 mph); 195 km/h (121 mph)	205 km/h (127 mph); 200 km/h (124 mph)	210 km/h (130 mph)	225 km/h (140 mph)
Fuel Tank Capacity	82 L (21.7 US gal; 18.0 imp gal)	96 L (25.4 US gal; 21.1 imp gal)				
Fuel Consumption (Note: Fuel consumption: guideline DIN 70030: determined at 3/4 of top-speed (not more than 110 km/h), plus 10%)	10.6 L/100 km (22 mpg_{‑US}; 27 mpg_{‑imp})	12.5 L/100 km (18.8 mpg_{‑US}; 22.6 mpg_{‑imp})		13.0 L/100 km (18.1 mpg_{‑US}; 21.7 mpg_{‑imp})	14.5 L/100 km (16.2 mpg_{‑US}; 19.5 mpg_{‑imp})	16.0 L/100 km (14.7 mpg_{‑US}; 17.7 mpg_{‑imp})

== Features ==
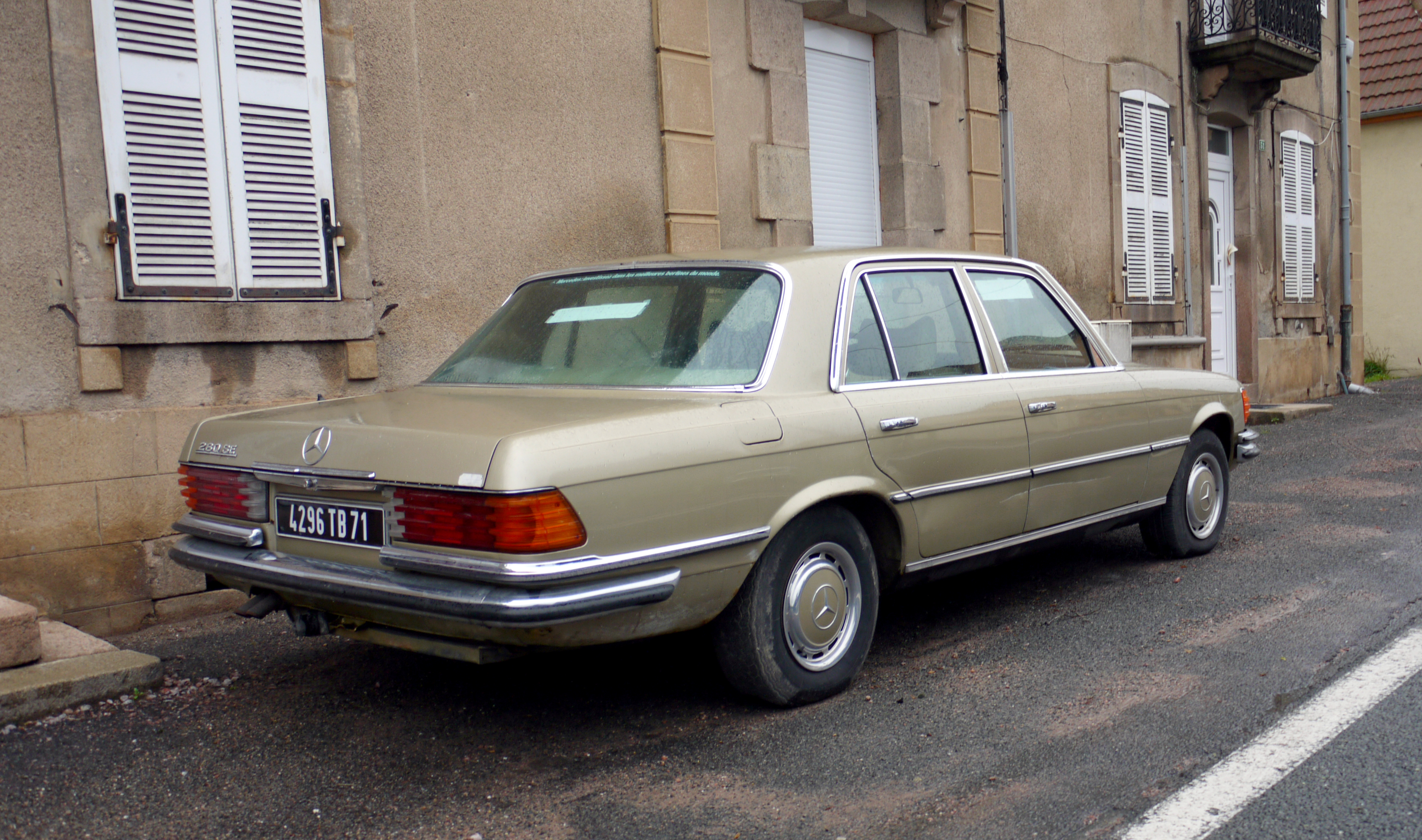
Mercedes-Benz 280 SE (France)

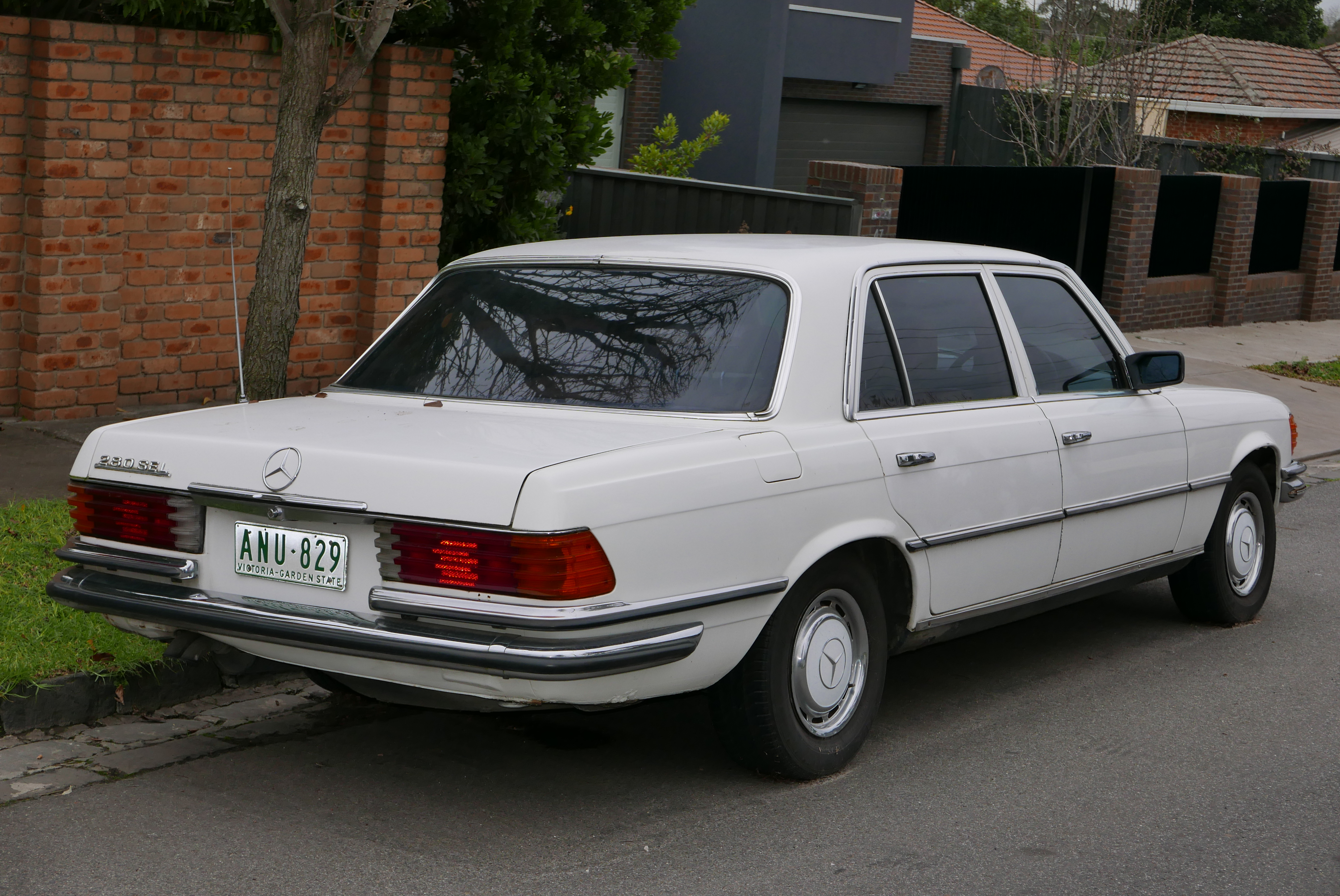
Mercedes-Benz 280 SEL (Australia)

The W 116 S-Class incorporated a broad variety of Mercedes-Benz safety innovations.

- Four wheel anti-lock brakes were first featured as an option on the 1978 W 116. This system prevents the wheels from locking while braking. The system improves steering control during hard braking situations, and to shorten brake distances.
- Strengthened body structure. The W 116 featured a more stable security passenger cell with a stiffened roof frame structure. High strength roof and door pillars, along with other reinforced zones, provided enhanced vehicle occupant protection.
- Deformation zones (crumple zones) in the front and rear.
- A padded dashboard, deformable switches and controls, and a four-spoke steering wheel with impact absorber and broad impact cushion aimed to reduce occupant injury during collisions.
- The fuel tank was no longer fitted at the rear end, but was now placed above the rear axle for added protection.
- Wraparound turn signals made it easier to communicate with nearby drivers.

== Shanghai SH771 ==
In China a copy of the Mercedes-Benz W 116 was built in 1974 as the Shanghai SH771 by Shanghai Automobile to replace its old 1950s Shanghai SH760. It had some styling differences from the Mercedes-Benz W 116 and used the 5.6 liter V8 from the Hongqi CA770 luxury car. Never produced, only 30 SH771s were built, and were used for testing until 1978. Beijing did not approve of full-scale production for the SH771.
