= Mercedes-Benz M100 engine =

World's first production V8 OHC engine, from 1964

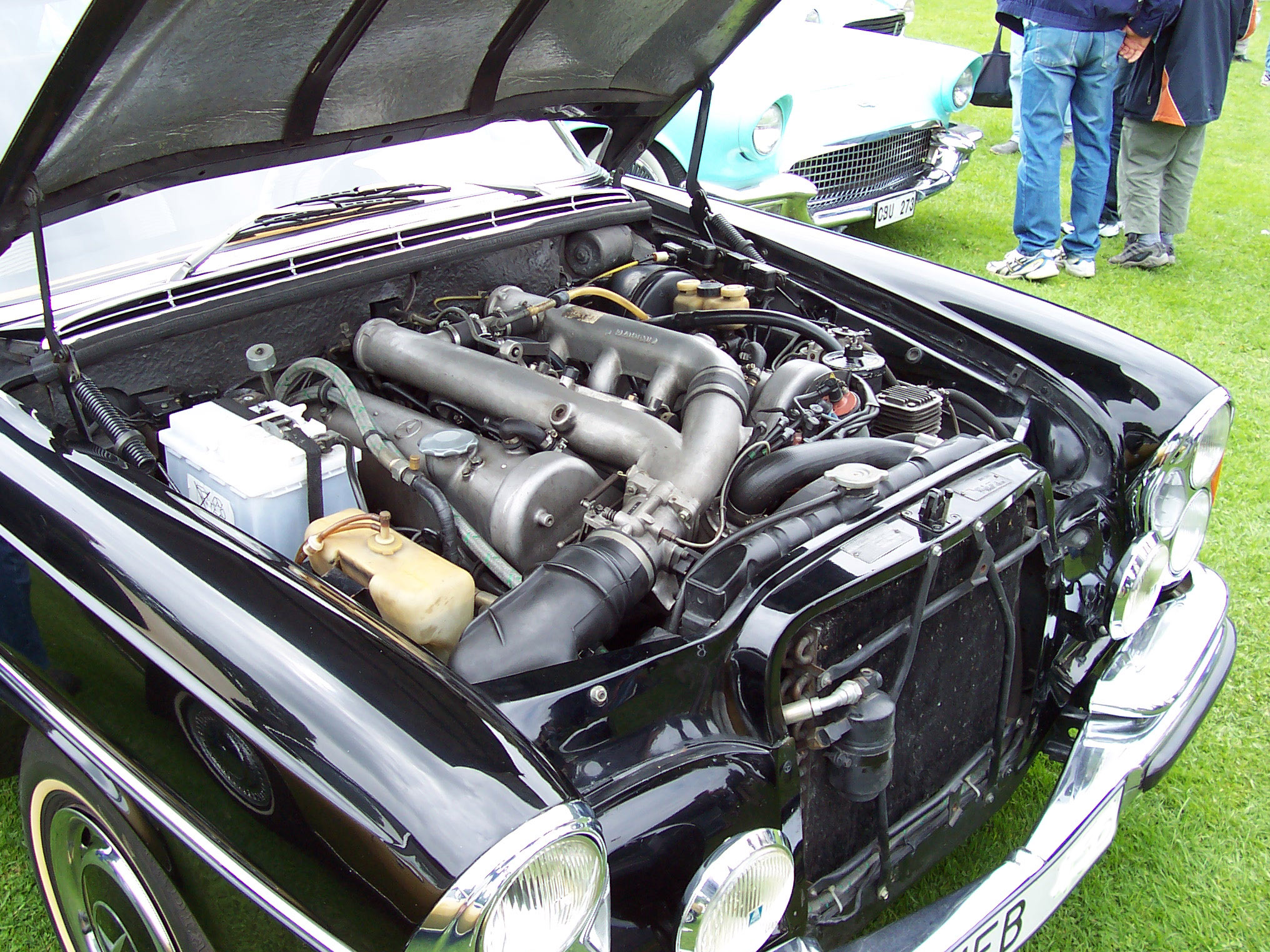
- In a Mercedes-Benz 300 SEL 6.3

Overview
- Manufacturer: Daimler-Benz
- Production: 1964–1981

Layout
- Configuration: Naturally aspirated V8
- Displacement: 6,333 cc (6.3 L; 386.5 cu in) (1964–1981); 6,834 cc (6.8 L; 417.0 cu in) (1975–1981)
- Cylinder bore: 103 mm (4.06 in) (1964–1981); 107 mm (4.21 in) (1975–1981)
- Piston stroke: 95 mm (3.74 in)
- Cylinder block material: Cast iron
- Cylinder head material: Aluminum
- Valvetrain: SOHC
- Compression ratio: 9.0:1 (1964–1981); 8.8:1 (1975–1981)

Combustion
- Fuel system: Mechanical fuel injection
- Management: Bosch 8-point mechanical fuel injection (1964–1981); Bosch K-Jetronic (1975–1981)
- Fuel type: Gasoline
- Oil system: Pressure circulation lubrication (1964–1981); Dry sump (1975–1981)
- Cooling system: Water-cooled

Output
- Power output: 250 PS (184 kW; 247 hp) at 4000 rpm (1964–1981); 286 PS (210 kW; 282 hp) at 4250 rpm (1975–1981)
- Torque output: 51 kp⋅m (500 N⋅m; 369 lb⋅ft) at 2800 rpm (1964–1981); 56 kp⋅m (549 N⋅m; 405 lb⋅ft) at 3000 rpm (1975–1981)

The Mercedes-Benz M 100 engine was a 6,333 cc (386.5 cu in) or 6,834 cc (417.0 cu in) single overhead cam V8 produced by Mercedes-Benz between 1964 and 1981. The successor to the M 189 version of the company's venerated 2,996 cc (182.8 cu in) straight-6 M 186, it was introduced in the flagship Mercedes-Benz 600 in 1964. From 1968 to 1972, it was fitted also into the S-class body for a special high-performance 300 SEL 6.3 sports sedan that was replaced by the 450 SEL 6 9 in 1975.

== Design ==
The original displacement of 6,333 cc (386.5 cu in) exceeded that of the original, 6,231 cc (380.2 cu in) Rolls-Royce V8 engine by about 0.1 L. In the 1970s, AMG enlarged M 100 engines to 6.8 L, for racing and road use. In the US, catalytic converters and unleaded fuel caused loss of power and Rolls-Royce accordingly increased the size of their V8 to 6,750 cc (6.8 L; 411.9 cu in). In response, the M 100 engine was enlarged to 6,834 cc (417.0 cu in) for the 450 SEL 6.9 (1975–1981). Actually a 6.8 litre engine, it was designated "6.9" to emphasize that its displacement still exceeded that of the enlarged Rolls-Royce V8 engine.

The M 100 featured a cast iron block, aluminum alloy heads, and aircraft-style sodium-filled valves operating against hardened valve seats. As in all Mercedes-Benz automobile engines, the crankshaft, connecting rods and pistons were forged instead of cast.

Each hand-built unit was bench-tested for 265 minutes, 40 of which were under full load. When introduced, it utilized the complicated Bosch 8-point mechanical fuel injection. The later 6.9 used a simpler Bosch K-Jetronic Continuous Injection System.

The 6.3 L engine was conservatively rated at 250 PS (184 kW; 247 hp), with 51 kp⋅m (500 N⋅m; 369 lb⋅ft) of torque helping to compensate for the 2.85 to 1 final drive ratio necessary for sustained high-speed cruising.

In non-US trim, the larger engine produced 286 PS (210 kW; 282 hp) with 550 N⋅m (406 lb⋅ft) of torque. The North American version, introduced in 1977, was significantly less powerful at 250 hp (186 kW; 253 PS) and 360 lb⋅ft (488 N⋅m) of torque due to more stringent emissions control requirements.

As a dry sump engine lubrication system reduces overall engine height, the 6.8 L M 100 used it in order to fit into the much flatter motor house of the W 116. As a side effect it enhanced longevity. Originally developed for racing as a way to prevent oil starvation during aggressive cornering, which in turn would create a serious drop in oil pressure, it allowed sustained high speeds at full engine power. The M 100 system circulated a massive twelve litres of oil through the engine and a storage tank mounted inside the right front fender, as opposed to the usual five or six litres found in V8s with a standard oil pan and oil pump configuration. The dry sump system also had the benefit of extending the oil change interval to 12,500 miles (20,100 km). This, along with hydraulic valve lifters which required no adjusting and special cylinder head gaskets which eliminated the need for periodic retorquing of the head bolts, made the 6.9 nearly maintenance-free for its first 50,000 miles (80,000 km).
