= 6.3 (song) =

Single by Naps featuring Ninho

from the album Carré VIP
- Language: French
- Released: 2020
- Length: 3:37
- Songwriters: Naps; Ninho
- Producer: Naps Ninho

Naps featuring Ninho singles chronology
"Bande organisée" (2020)	"6.3" (2020)	"La kiffance" (2021)

Music video
- "6.3" on YouTube

"6.3" is a song by French rapper Naps featuring Ninho. It was released in 2020.

== Charts ==
Chart performance for "6.3"
Chart	Peak position
Belgium (Ultratop 50 Wallonia)	31
France (SNEP)	1
Switzerland (Schweizer Hitparade)	37

== Certifications ==
Region	Certification	Certified units/sales
France (SNEP)	Diamond	333,333^{‡}
^{‡} Sales+streaming figures based on certification alone.
