= Mercedes-Benz 300 SEL 6.3 =

Motor vehicle from 1967

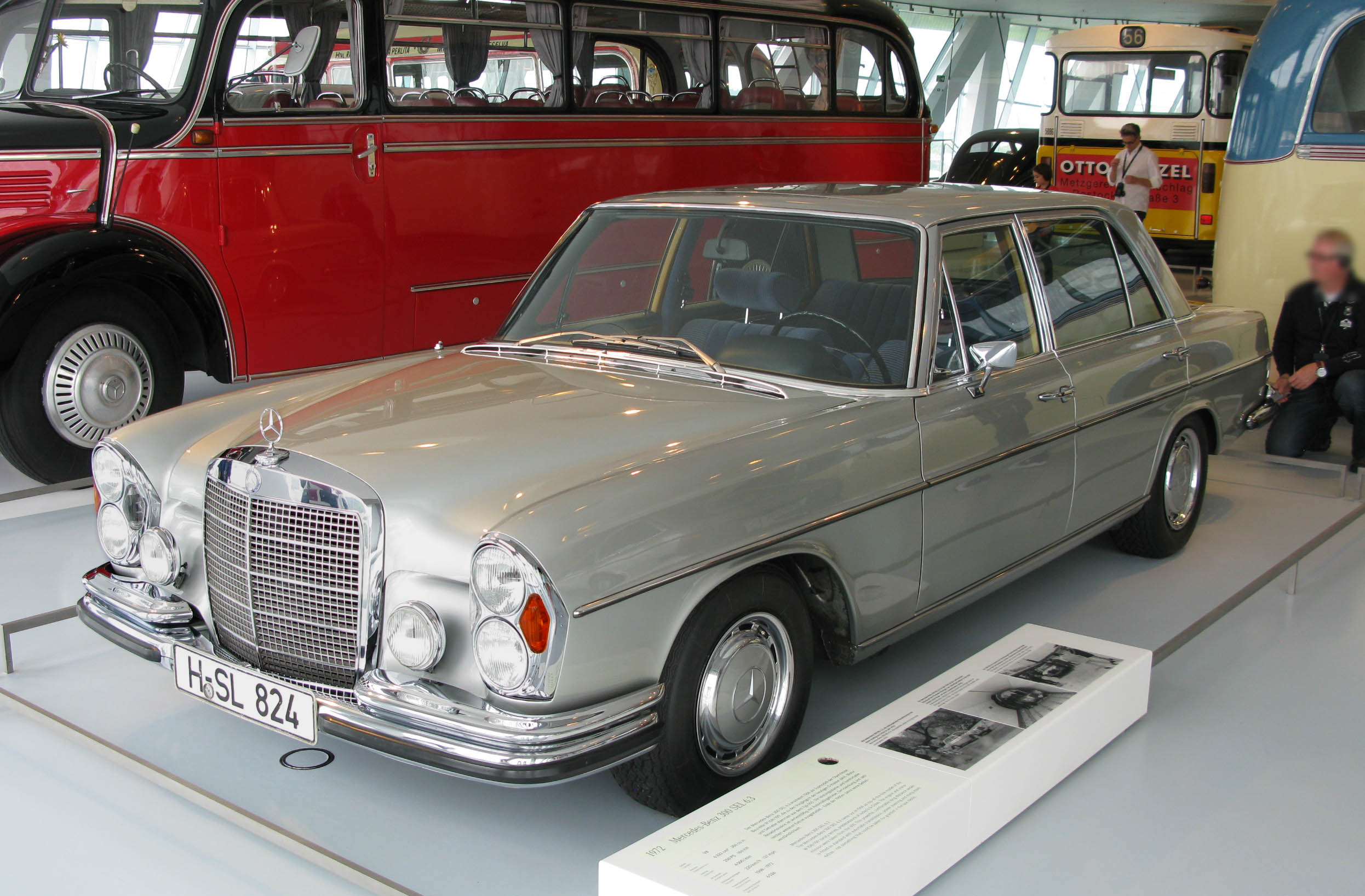

Overview
- Manufacturer: Mercedes-Benz
- Production: 1967–1972; 6,526 built
- Assembly: West Germany: Stuttgart
- Designer: Paul Bracq, Erich Waxenberger

Body and chassis
- Class: Full-size luxury car
- Body style: 4-door saloon
- Layout: FR layout
- Platform: Mercedes-Benz W109

Powertrain
- Engine: 6,332 cc (386.4 cu in) M100 V8
- Transmission: 4-speed K4B 050 automatic

Dimensions
- Wheelbase: 2,865 mm (112.8 in)
- Length: 5,000 mm (196.9 in)
- Width: 1,810 mm (71.3 in)
- Height: 1,420 mm (55.9 in)
- Curb weight: 1,780 kg (3,920 lb)

Chronology
- Successor: Mercedes-Benz 450 SEL 6.9

The Mercedes-Benz 300 SEL 6.3 is a full-sized luxury performance car built by Mercedes-Benz from 1967 to 1972. It featured the company's powerful 6.3-litre M100 V8 from the flagship 600 (W100) limousine installed in the normally six-cylinder powered (but still premium) Mercedes-Benz 300 SEL (W109). The result was a nearly 2-ton sports saloon with muscle car performance. At the time of its release it was one of the world's fastest four-door cars.

A total of 6,526 300 SEL 6.3s were produced, and though quite costly to maintain are very collectible today.

== Concept ==
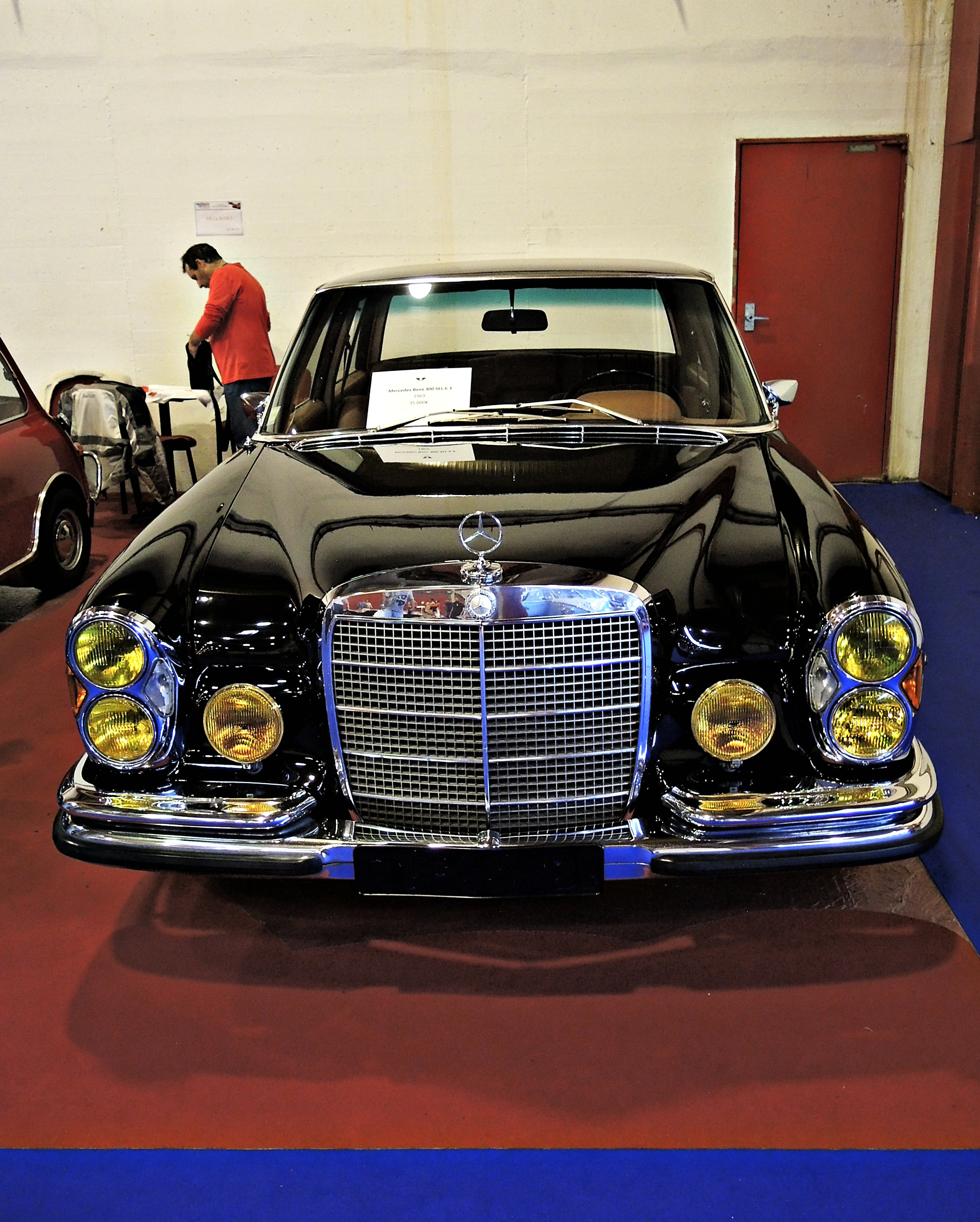

The car started out as a private venture in 1966 by company engineer Erich Waxenberger in response to a journalist of German automotive magazine Auto, Motor und Sport, who had described Mercedes-Benz cars as great, but not very exciting, describing them as "granny cars". His principle was simple: take the powerful 6.3 litre Mercedes-Benz M100 V8 from the massive 600 saloon and limousine, and fit it into the engine bay of the top-end 6-cylinder 300 SEL W109 model. The result was an impressive level of performance for the era and for the style of automobile. He then invited many company directors, including his direct boss Rudolf Uhlenhaut, to take a test drive in the otherwise unassuming-looking car. Uhlenhaut was positively impressed, and gave the project his approval.

The company turned the prototype into a production model, introduced at the Geneva Motor Show in March 1968. This not only enhanced Mercedes-Benz's reputation for performance vehicles, languishing since the demise of the iconic Gullwing and Mercedes-Benz 300 SL roadsters of the 1950s, but made better use of the M100 engine production facilities. By the end of line's production the 6,500 built for the 300 SEL 6.3 far outnumbered the 2,700 turned out for the 600.

The 6.3 was known for its ability to cruise at over 200 km/h (124 mph) with five occupants in complete comfort. Later, the company also fitted new, smaller V8 engines into the W109 series. The 300 SEL 4.5 was only available in the United States, while the 280 SE 3.5 Coupé could also be ordered in Europe.

In 1975, the Mercedes-Benz 450 SEL 6.9 was introduced as a 300 SEL 6.3 successor with a larger displacement engine for more power and various modifications to the equipment.

== Features ==
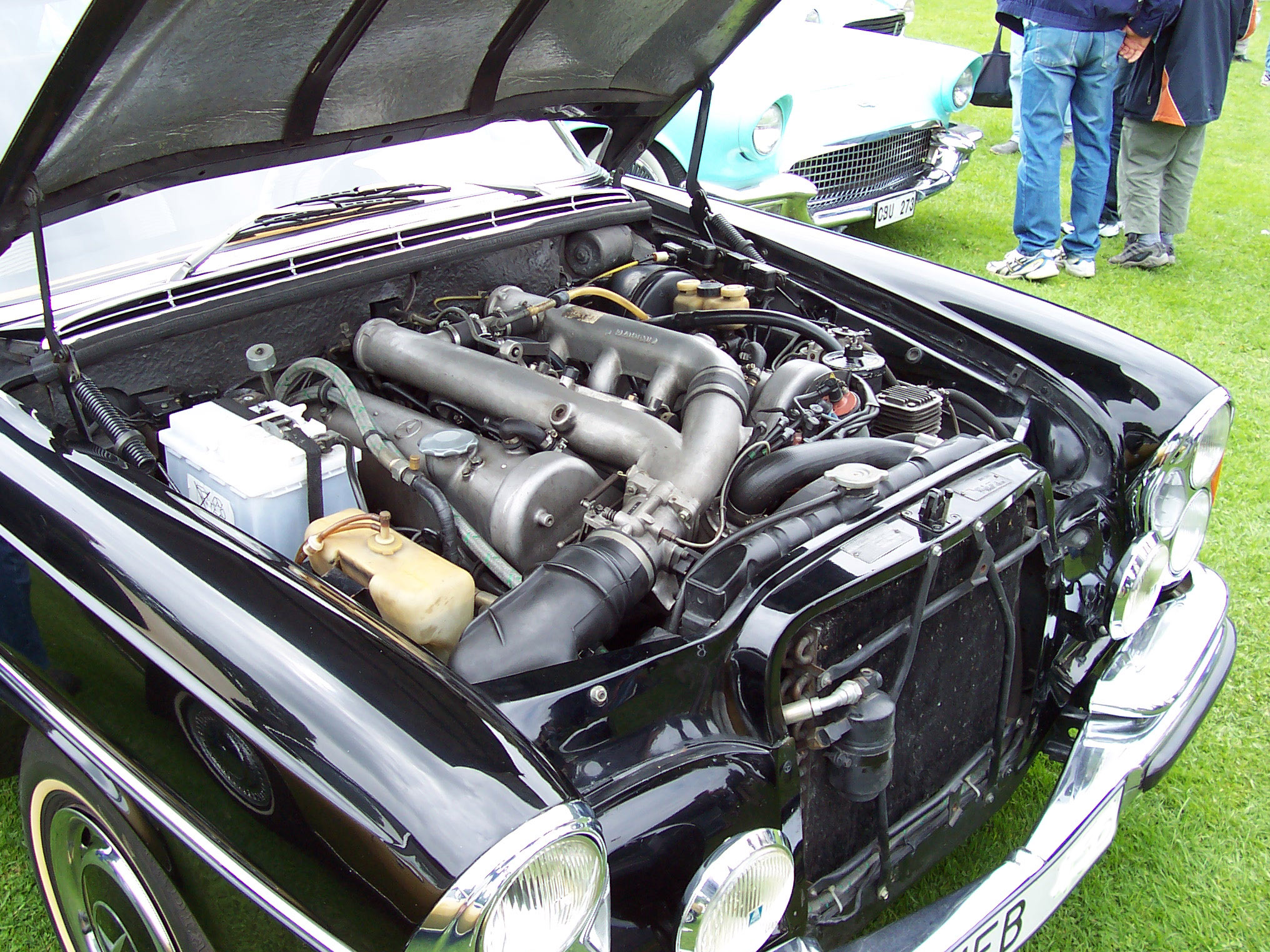
M100 engine in a 300 SEL 6.3

The 300 SEL 6.3 was considered a luxurious vehicle for its era. Standard features included air suspension, ventilated 4-wheel power disc brakes, power windows, central locking and power steering. Air conditioning, power sunroof, audio tape deck, and rear window curtains, writing tables, and reading lamps were available as options.

=== Engine ===
Mercedes-Benz M100 engine

- 6,332 cc (386.4 cu in) V8 with Bosch fuel injection,
- 250 PS (184 kW; 247 hp) at 4000 rpm, 300 HP SAE gross at 4100 rpm
- 51 kp⋅m (370 lb⋅ft) at 2800 rpm, 588 N⋅m (434 lb⋅ft) SAE at 3000 rpm
- Max. engine speed: 5250 rpm

=== Performance ===
- 0-62 mph (100 km/h): 6.6 seconds
- 0-100 mph (160 km/h) : 14.6 seconds
- Standing quarter-mile (~400 m) : 14.2 seconds
- Top speed : 220 km/h (137 mph) (factory figure)

=== Test results ===
Auto, Motor und Sport published the following test results for the 300 SEL 6.3 in March 1968:

- 0–80 km/h (49.7 mph): 4.3 s
- 0–100 km/h (62.1 mph): 6.5 s
- 0–120 km/h (74.6 mph): 9.3 s
- 0–140 km/h (87.0 mph): 13.0 s
- 0–160 km/h (99.4 mph): 17.3 s
- 0–180 km/h (111.8 mph): 22.8 s
- 0–200 km/h (124.3 mph): 31.0 s
- 0–1,000 m (3,281 ft): 27.1 s
- Top Speed: 220 km/h (137 mph)

== Motor racing ==
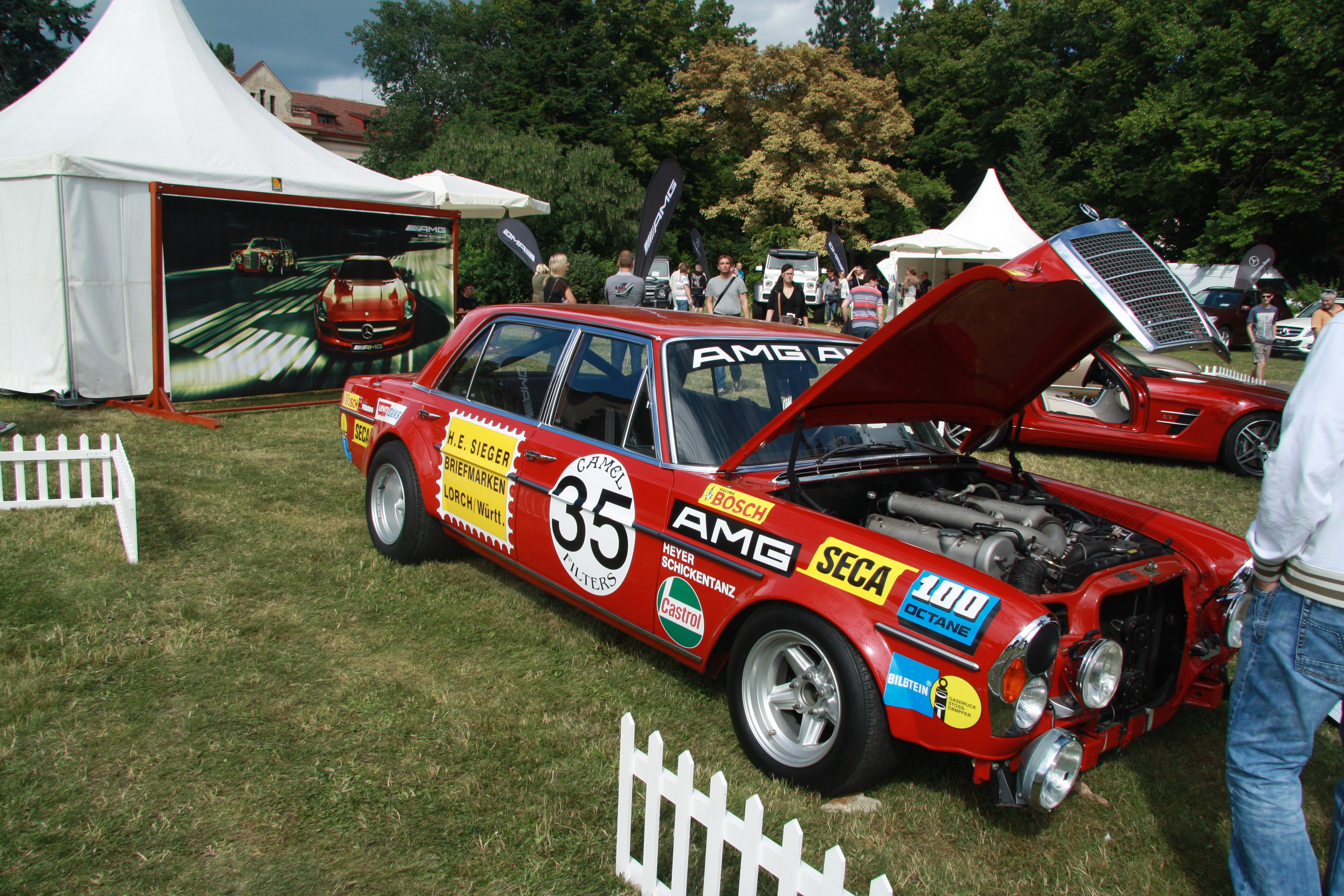
AMG "Red Sow" (German: AMG "Rote Sau") car at legendary 2014 car show in Prague

Originally not intended for motor sports, a few cars were built for racing, usually with the engine enlarged to 6.8 litres or more. The car had an impressive, but short-lived racing career, due to the lack of suitable tyres, or rule changes preventing the use of them.

AMG, now the high-performance division of Mercedes-Benz but back then a small local tuning workshop founded by two former Mercedes engineers, modified a makeshift car to compete in racing events, nicknamed "Red Sow" (German: "Rote Sau"), which finished second in the 24 Hours of Spa in 1971. At the end of its racing career the 6,834 cc engine yielded 428 PS (315 kW; 422 hp). The car was sold to French company Matra, which used it for tests of jet fighter landing gear. Five examples were built: three racers and two test cars.
