= Mercedes-Benz 600 =

Range of German cars (1963–1981)

Mercedes-Benz 600 (W100)
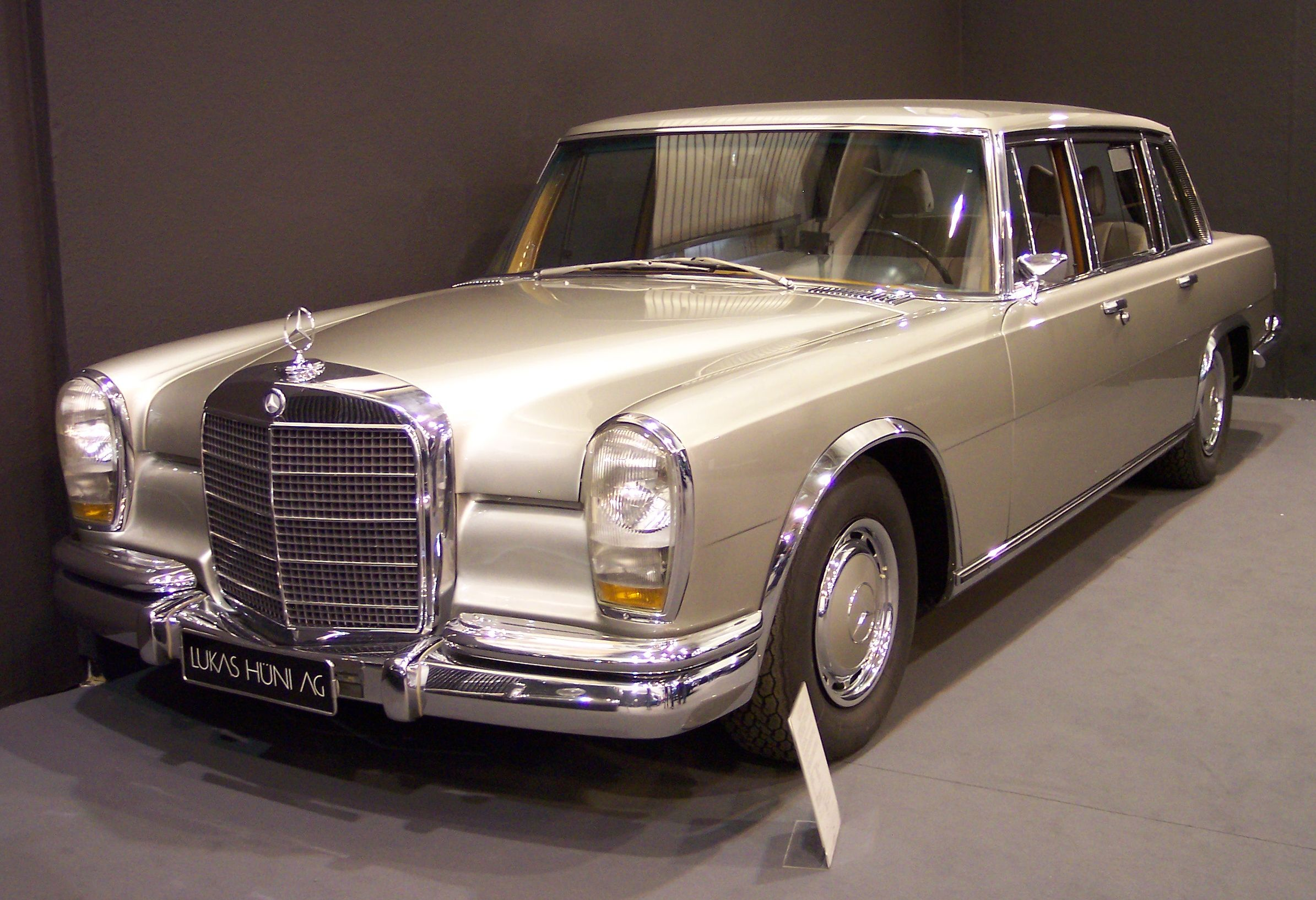

Overview
- Manufacturer: Daimler-Benz
- Also called: German: Grosser Mercedes
- Production: 1963–1981; 2,677 built; SWB: 2,190; LWB: 428; Landaulet: 59
- Assembly: West Germany: Stuttgart
- Designer: Friedrich Geiger; Paul Bracq

Body and chassis
- Class: Ultra-luxury car; Limousine
- Body style: 4-door Limousine (SWB); 4-door Pullman Limousine; 6-door Pullman Limousine; Landaulet
- Layout: FR layout

Powertrain
- Engine: 6.3 L M100 V8
- Transmission: 4-speed automatic

Dimensions
- Wheelbase: SWB: 3,200 mm (126.0 in); LWB: 3,900 mm (153.5 in)
- Length: SWB: 5,540 mm (218.1 in); LWB: 6,240 mm (245.7 in)
- Width: 1,950 mm (76.8 in)
- Height: SWB: 1,500 mm (59.1 in); LWB: 1,510 mm (59.4 in)
- Curb weight: 2,990–3,280 kg (6,590–7,230 lb)

Chronology
- Predecessor: Mercedes-Benz 770
- Successor: Maybach 57 and 62

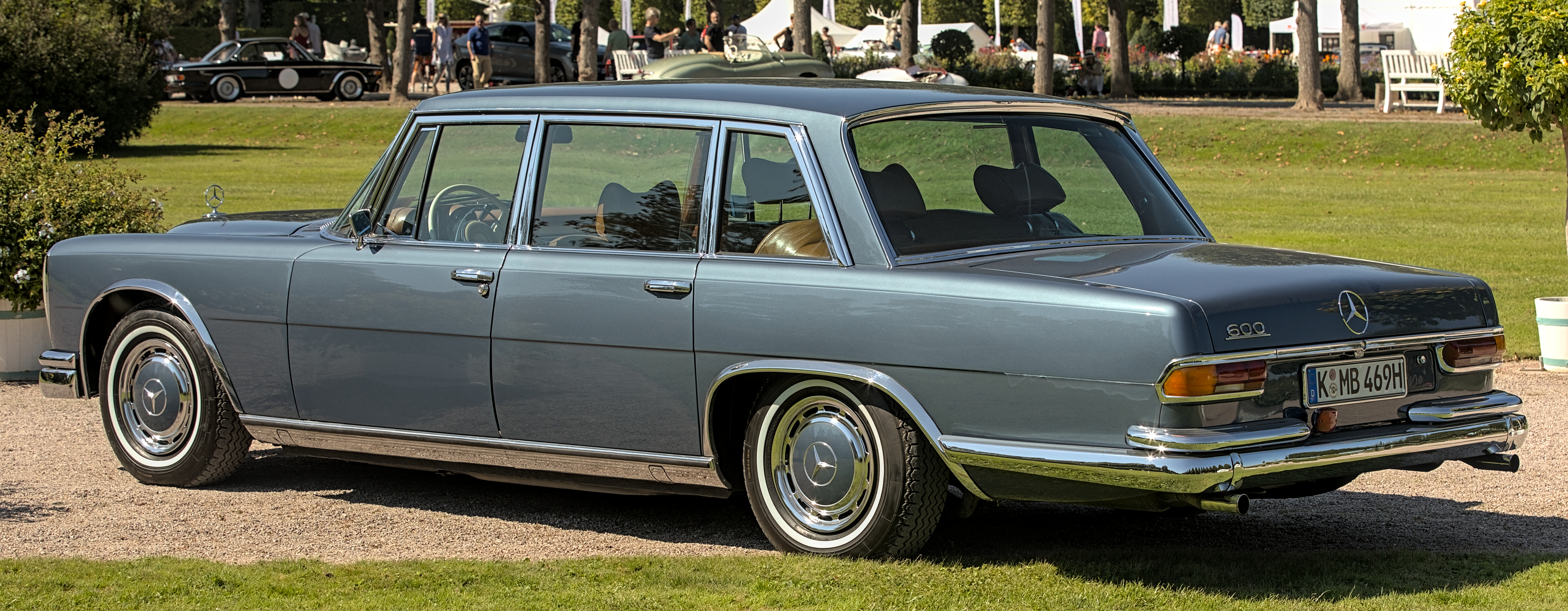
Mercedes 600 Saloon rear

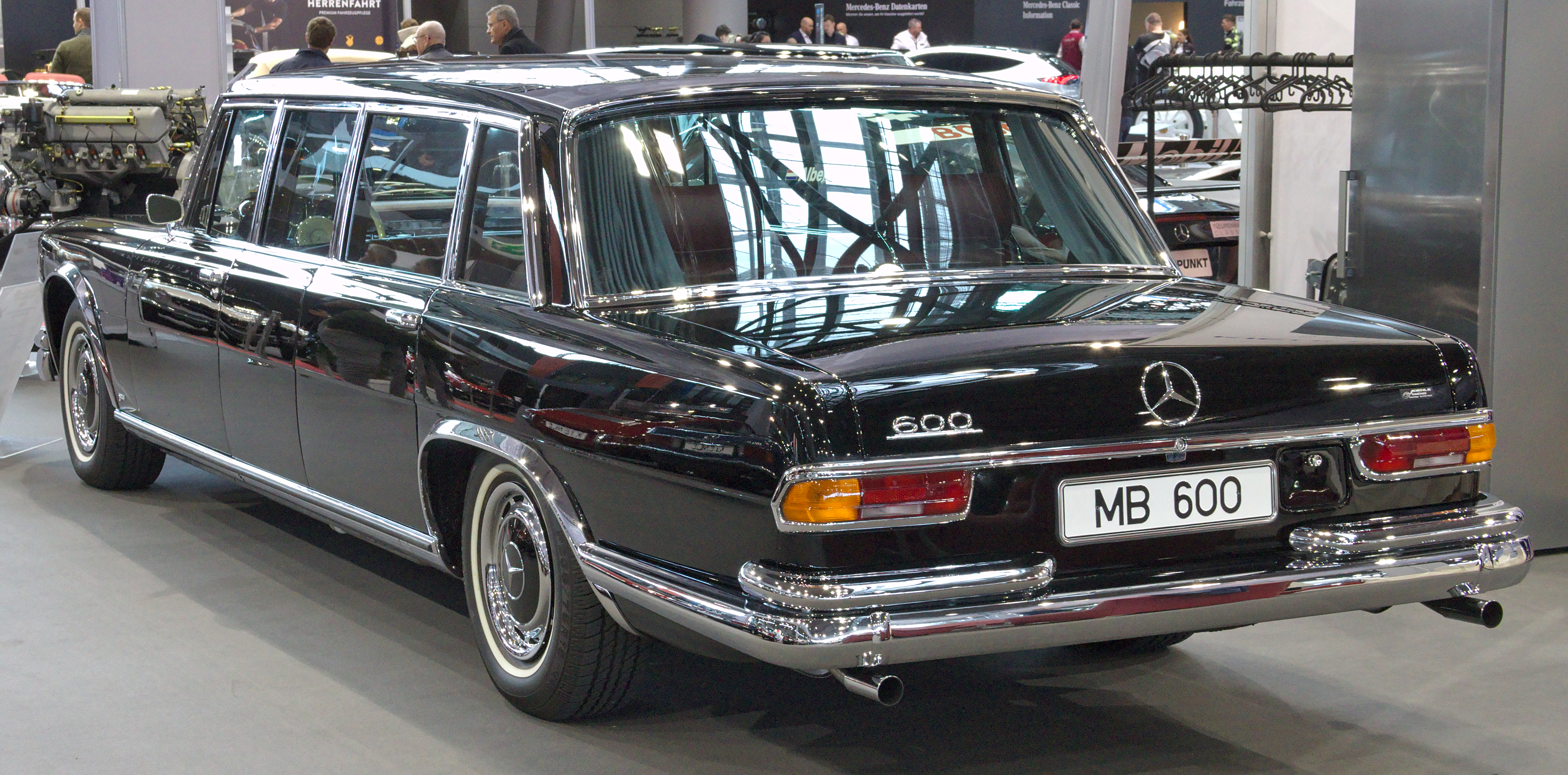
Mercedes 600 Pullman rear view

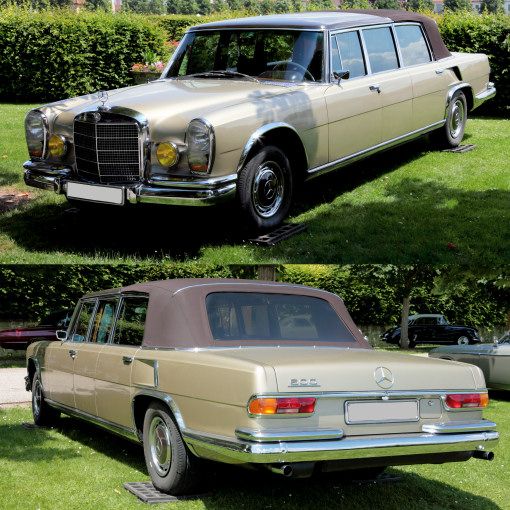
Mercedes 600 Landaulet

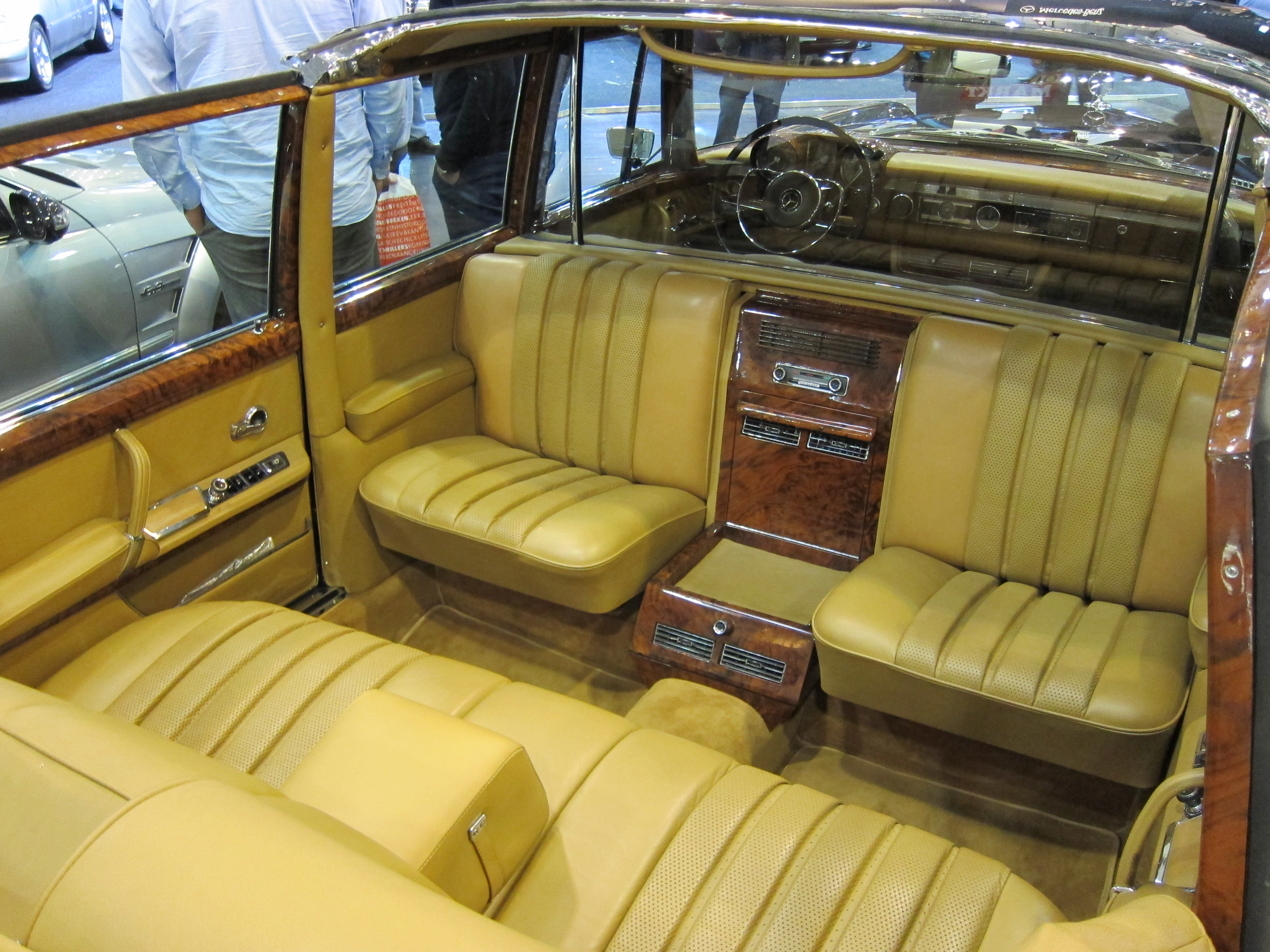
Mercedes 600 Landaulet rear seating area

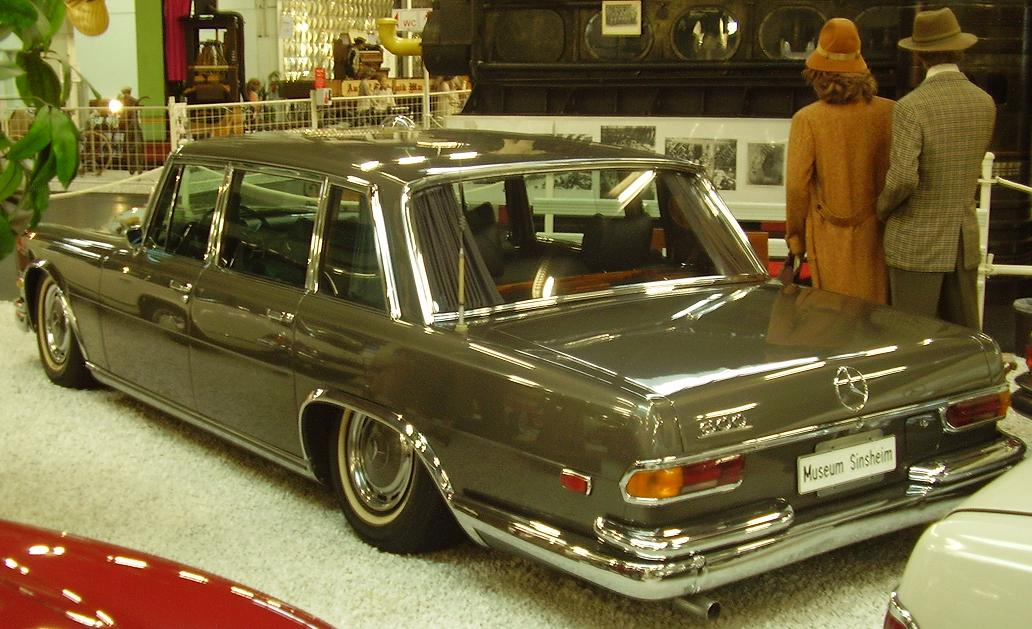
600 in Museum Sinsheim, sitting low until the air compressor re-supplies pressure to the suspension

The Mercedes-Benz 600 (W100) is a single-generation of full-size ultra-luxury limousines, made by Daimler-Benz from 1963 through 1981. Nicknamed the Grosser (Grand/Large) Mercedes after its 1930s counterpart, the Mercedes 770. It was positioned well above the subsequent 300-series in price, amenities, and status. At its launch in 1963, the Mercedes 600 was the most expensive car in the world. Its few lesser adversaries included British and American marques such as Rolls-Royce, Bentley, Cadillac and Lincoln's top model lines. Despite its age, the Mercedes 600 remains costly to own and maintain. It is widely regarded by automotive historians and enthusiasts as the greatest luxury automobile ever produced.

The Mercedes-Benz 600 models are well known for their ownership among celebrities, political leaders and royalty throughout the late 20th century. The 600 was notable for its advanced hydraulic systems. Ownership of a Mercedes-Benz 600 remains costly due to the vehicle's complexity and the high expense of parts and maintenance. Well-preserved examples and historically significant models can command prices of up to $3.5 million reflecting their rarity and prestige.

Generally, the short-wheelbase (SWB) models were designed to be owner-driven, whereas the long-wheelbase (LWB) and limousine models, often incorporating a central divider with power window, were intended for chauffeur operation.

"Living legend: the Mercedes-Benz 600 is nothing but grand. With its groundbreaking engineering, this iconic vehicle has been defining automotive luxury since its first appearance in 1963." - Mercedes Benz

== History ==
The 600 replaced the Mercedes-Benz W189 300d limousine, the final version of the W186 and W189 model 300-series company flagship produced between the early 1950s and early 1960s. The elder W186 received the nickname Adenauer after Konrad Adenauer, the first Chancellor of West Germany, who employed several of these automobiles during his tenure in office.

Series production began in August 1963 for the 1964 model year, and continued through to 1981. During this time, production totalled 2,677 units, comprising 2,190 Saloons, 304 Pullmans, 124 6-door Pullmans and 59 Landaulets.

The 600 succeeded the 1961 Mercedes-Benz W112 in using a pneumatic self-levelling suspension, an enhancement of the Mercedes-Benz 300d Adenauer's dashboard activated mechanical torsion bar based system. A version is incorporated in Mercedes' current Active Body Control.

With its demise in 1981, the 600 marked the last ultra-luxury model that the brand produced in a line since the model 60 hp Simplex from 1903, albeit not continuously. The company would return to this segment some 20 years later with the Maybach 57/62, but these extremely expensive cars failed to sell in expected and necessary numbers. As a result, Mercedes-Benz ended production of the Maybach brand in 2012. As of 2026, the Mercedes flagship is the Mercedes-Maybach S-Class, which does not use its own platform and therefore represents shift to a more cost-effective approach to covering that luxury segment. However, it is seen as a spiritual successor to the Maybach, since it is the first luxury Mercedes-Benz production model since the 600 to feature some bespoke design touches not available on the standard S-Class.

== Models ==
Mercedes-Benz 600 "Pullman" limousine, carrying US President Jimmy Carter in Liberia, 1978

The 600 came in two wheelbase lengths, producing three main variants:

- A short wheelbase 4-door saloon, available with a power divider window separating the front seats from the rear bench seat, although most were built without this feature.
- A long wheelbase 4-door "Pullman" limousine (with two additional rear-facing seats separated from the driver compartment by a power divider window, of which 304 were built)
- A long wheelbase 6-door Pullman limousine (with power divider and two forward-facing jump-seats at the middle two doors and a rear bench-seat).

A number of the limousines were converted into landaulets, with a retractable top over part or all of the rear passenger compartment. The more common short roof version folds down like a cabriolet over just the last row of seats, leaving the door frames in place and the area forward of it covered with the metal roof, while the long roof folds back from the cabin divider (and leaves all door frames in place). Known as the "Presidential roof", it was especially rare with 6-door landaulets. In all, 59 landaulets were produced, 23 four-door models of unknown breakdown, 17 6-door short roofs, and 9 six-door long roofs.

Landaulets like these were also notably used by the German government, as during the 1965 state visit of Queen Elizabeth II. The Vatican, in addition to an elongated Mercedes 300d 4-door landaulet, used for the Pope a specially designed Mercedes 600 4-door landaulet, which now resides at the Mercedes-Benz Museum in Stuttgart. Production of the landaulet versions of the 600 ended in 1980. A six-door long roof landaulet used by former Yugoslavian president Josip Broz Tito sold in 2017 in England for £2.5 million.

Mercedes also made one special short-wheelbase, 2-door 600 coupé, in 1965, with the standard wheelbase shortened 22 cm (8.6 inches) between the axles, to 298 cm (117.3 in). A single example of a short-wheelbase 4-door landaulet, combining the handling of a short-wheelbase with the qualities of a landaulet, was built by Mercedes in 1967 for former racing driver Philipp Constantin von Berckheim.

== Mechanical ==
The 600's great size, weight, and numerous hydraulically driven amenities required more power than Mercedes' largest engine at that time, the 3-litre 6-cylinder M189, could produce. A new V8 with more than twice the capacity was developed, the 6.3 L (384.4 cu in) M100. It featured a single overhead camshaft (SOHC) per cylinder bank and a Bosch-made intermittent 8-point mechanical fuel injection, and developed 250 PS (184 kW; 247 hp).

Originally, chief engineer Fritz Nallinger overseeing the design envisioned two models: base model was to be 500, referring to the planned 5-litre capacity of the V8 engine; and top model 750 was to feature a 7.5-litre V12, the design of which was assigned to engine designer Adolf Wente. The engine, codenamed M101, was to share the 90-degree bank angle with the V8, but feature dual chain-driven dual overhead camshafts, a Bosch fuel injection pump located in the central vee, with twin distributors. The engine was intended to deliver around 380-400 bhp. However, as the V8 engine was eventually enlarged to 6.3 litres, the V12 never entered production.

The 600 used what Mercedes referred to as the comfort hydraulic system (German: Komfort-Hydraulik-System), which was made specifically for the 600 in conjunction with Bosch. The system was extremely complex, utilizing pressurized hydraulic fluid to control the cars windows, seats, optional sunroof, boot lid, ventilator flap, and air conditioning. On early models, this system was also able to pull the doors in if they weren't fully latched, acting as an early form of self closing doors.

The closed loop hydraulic system was powered by an engine driven pump that pressurized the fluid to around 150-bar (2,176 psi). When a switch for a hydraulically controlled amenity was pressed, it would activate a control valve that would allow the fluid to transfer energy to the pistons that powered said amenity. There was a nitrogen-filled accumulator present to maintain some hydraulic pressure when the car was off. The hydraulics gave the amenities of the 600 unusually quick and quiet operations compared to the more traditional vacuum and electrical setups of other luxury cars. The hydraulics require attentive maintenance, as a leak in any of the lines could lead to amenities not working as they should and eventually a complete failure of the system. Mercedes offered an optional 'hydraulic repair kit' with special tools that owners could use in the event of a minor hydraulic failure.

The suspension of the 600 was not fully hydraulically controlled, as Citroën owned a patent for a hydropneumatic suspension system at the time. Instead, the 600 used a load leveling air suspension system similar to the Mercedes-Benz W112. Like the Komfort Hydraulik System, the air suspension was pressurized using an engine driven pump. The suspension had multiple settings that the driver could control from a switch on the steering column. These include 'N-mode' (for normal driving), 'H-mode' (increases ride height by 50 mm (2.0 in)) and 'S-mode' (disables air suspension for servicing). Unlike the other Mercedes models with this system, the 600 also uses the air pressure pump to control brake boosting. In the event of an air system failure, the brakes are designed to take priority over the air suspension and can even pull from the suspensions air supply in low pressure situations. The adjustable air suspension delivered excellent ride quality and sure handling over any road surface. It even beat lap times of the Mercedes-Benz 230SL.

== Notable owners ==
Famous owners of the Mercedes-Benz 600 have included the following:

=== Celebrities and tycoons ===
- Aristotle Onassis
- Bob Jane
- Bobby Womack asserts that Janis Joplin was inspired to write her song "Mercedes Benz" after riding with him in his new 600
- Coco Chanel
- David Bowie
- Eric Clapton
- Elizabeth Taylor
- Elvis Presley, who had three 1969 models, including a 6 door Pullman
- Francis Ford Coppola had a Pullman, among his unique and eclectic collection of classic automobiles
- Frank Packer
- Florian Schneider
- George Harrison
- Herbert von Karajan
- Hugh Hefner
- Jerry Lewis Owned a Tobacco Brown SWB version
- John Lennon
- Jay Kay, who owned Coco Chanel's car
- Jack Nicholson
- Jay Leno, who had his 600 (a 1972 SWB) fitted with a supercharger by Karl Middelhauve, making it the only 600 Kompressor in existence
- Jeremy Clarkson, whose car was originally supplied to an Egyptian ambassador
- Johannes, 11th Prince of Thurn and Taxis
- Karen Carpenter
- Mireille Mathieu
- Peter Anderson (cinematographer) This 600 was acquired by this Honorary Oscar recipient, from its previous owner, the Indian Ambassador to Germany
- Pete Townshend owns a six-door version
- Ringo Starr
- Ronnie Wood
- Rowan Atkinson
- Roy Orbison
- Robert Wood Johnson III
- Udo Jürgens

=== Politicians and royalty ===
- Anastasio Somoza Debayle, President of Nicaragua bought a SWB for his wife Hope Portocarrero from the first production run
- Bhumibol Adulyadej, King of Thailand
- B. J. Habibie, 3rd President of Indonesia
- Chen Yi, former Chinese Foreign Minister
- Daniel Moi
- Deng Xiaoping
- Deng Yingchao, wife of Zhou Enlai, the first Chinese Prime Minister
- Enver Hoxha
- François "Papa Doc" Duvalier
- François Tombalbaye
- Ferdinand Marcos, who owned four, including a landaulet, a 1981 bulletproof model and a six-door version
- F. W. de Klerk
- Habib Bourguiba, President of Tunisia
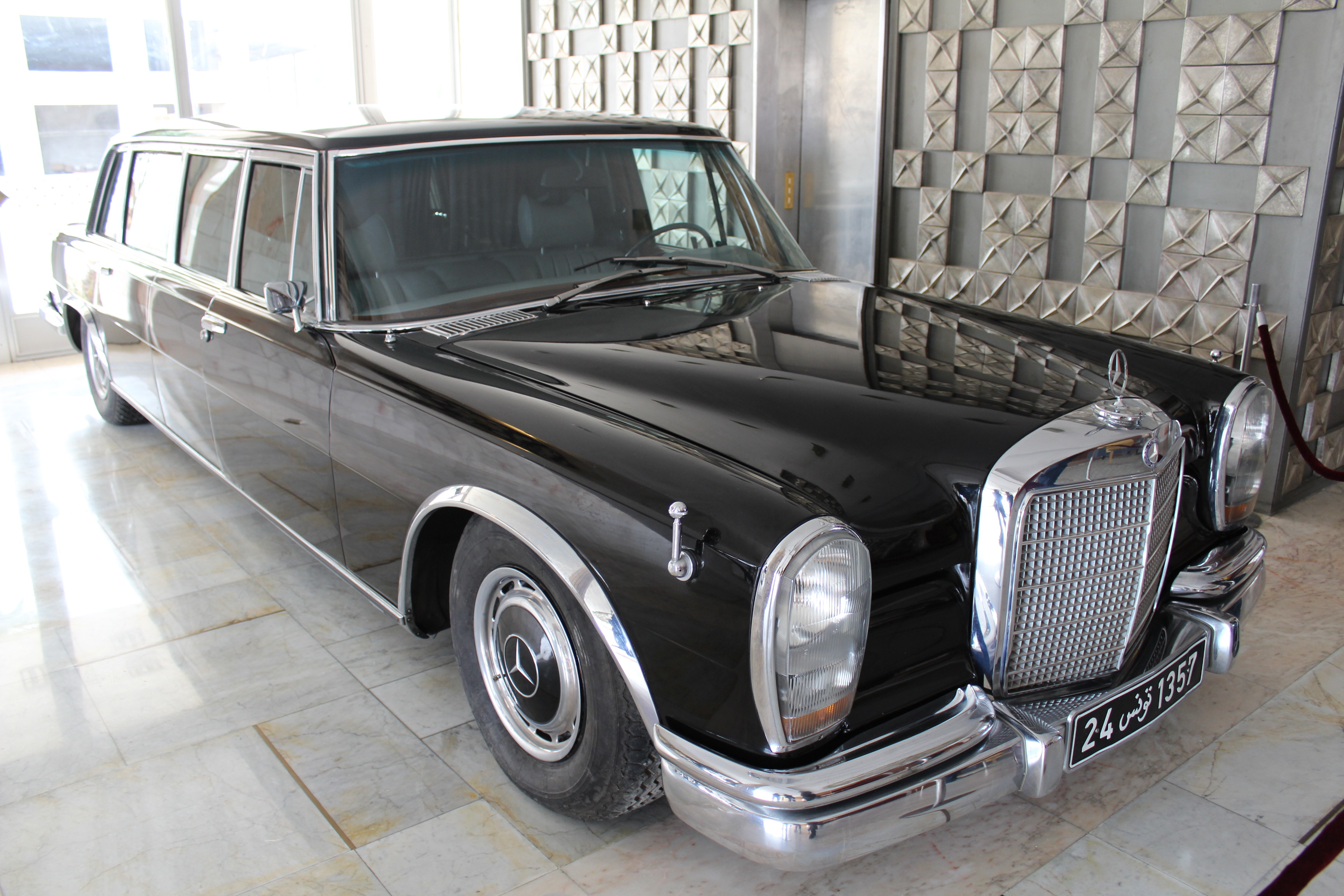
  Habib Bourguiba's 600 Pullman
- Hassan II of Morocco, King of Morocco
- Hastings Kamuzu Banda
- Hosni Mubarak
- Idi Amin
- Ibrahim, King of Malaysia
- Jim Fouché
- Josip Broz Tito, who owned four 1965 LWB 6-door Pullmans, one of which was armored, and two LWB Pullman landaulets, acquired in 1971 and 1978 respectively (both of these were of the very-rare type where the folding parade roof extends to cover 2/3rds of the vehicle top, only 9 were made with such a roof arrangement and 6 doors, and Tito was the only statesman in the world at the time who had two such cars)
- Jean-Bédel Bokassa
- Jean-Claude Duvalier
- John Vorster
- Jomo Kenyatta
- Khalid of Saudi Arabia
- Kim Il Sung
- Kim Jong Il
- Kim Jong Un; the North Korean government have also owned a landaulet (both seen in the 65th anniversary parade in Pyongyang on October 10, 2010)
- Leonid Brezhnev
- Léopold Sédar Senghor, President of Senegal; the first Senegalese regime (1960–1980) under him had three 600s, a short wheel base, a long wheel base, and a Landaulet, later replaced by the W126-based Carat Limousine
- Mohammad Reza Pahlavi, Shah of Iran, who owned multiple 600 models including 3 landaulet models and 18 others for national guard
- Mohammed VI of Morocco
- Muhammad Zia Ul Haq, a Pakistani four-star general who served as the President of Pakistan from 1978 until his death in 1988. Also kept the same 1970 Pullman 600 as the holder of the Prime Minister Office
- Mao Zedong, Chinese revolutionary leader
- Marais Viljoen
- Mobutu Sese Seko, dictator and president of the Democratic Republic of the Congo (Zaire)
- Nico Diederichs
- Nicolae Ceaușescu
- Norodom Sihanouk, former King of Cambodia
- Omar Bongo, President of Gabon.
- Otto Kerner Jr., Governor of Illinois from 1961 to 1968
- The Pope
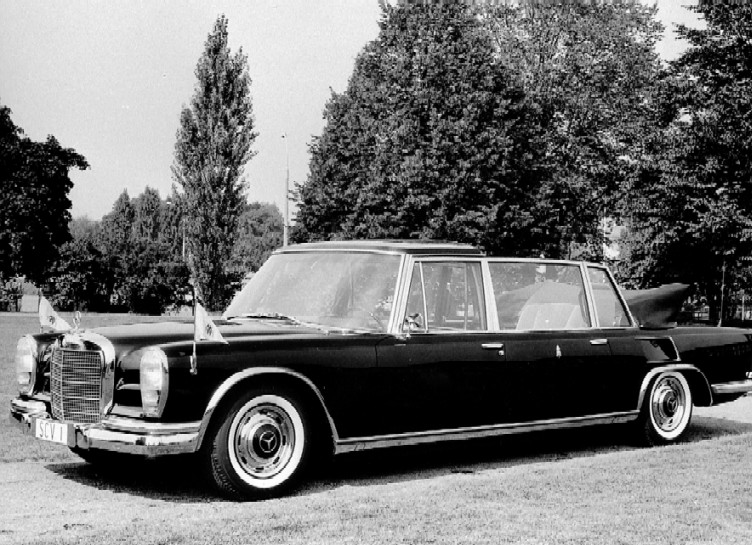
  Papal landaulet
- Park Chung Hee
- P. W. Botha
- Maharaj Ji/Prem Rawat, religious leader
- Pablo Escobar, Colombian drug dealer, owned a LWB 4-door which was destroyed in an attack on Escobar in Medellín in 1993
- Robert Mugabe
- Saddam Hussein, who owned a long-roof landaulet that was recovered after the fall of Baghdad and is today owned by the Petersen Automotive Museum in Los Angeles
- Silvio Berlusconi, Prime Minister of Italy
- Süleyman Demirel, 9th President of Turkey
- The President of Bangladesh
- Todor Zhivkov, former President of Bulgaria from 1956 to 1989. Used Government owned high-end Benz models from 300D Adenauer to 450 SEL 6.9 for daily routine, and for State visits- 1967 600 Pullman 6-door Landaulet. The 600 Landaulet is still in use today by Bulgarian Government for Special occasions and visits
- Zulfiqar Ali Bhutto, a Pakistani politician who served as the 9th Prime Minister of Pakistan from 1973 to 1977, and prior to that as the 4th President of Pakistan from 1971 to 1973. He kept a 1970 Pullman 600 for Prime Minister Office use

== In popular culture ==
In cinema, the Mercedes 600 was featured in several James Bond films, most notably as transport of the villain Ernst Stavro Blofeld in On Her Majesty's Secret Service and Diamonds Are Forever. In Octopussy, the villain Kamal Khan is seen leaving Sotheby's London auction house in a 600 Pullman. Near the beginning of 1978 movie Who Is Killing the Great Chefs of Europe?, the character played by Jacqueline Bisset is abducted from Heathrow Airport in a 600 Pullman.

In a Top Gear challenge, Jeremy Clarkson compared his 1973 short-wheelbase 600 to James May's 1972 Rolls-Royce Corniche. In Twin Peaks, the 600 was also used as a car in the first episode.

The song "United" released 1994, by Prince Ital Joe & Marky mark. Where driving in a 600 in the music video. United (Prince Ital Joe and Marky Mark song)

== Technical data ==
Technical Data Mercedes-Benz 600 (W 100) (Manufacturer's figures except where stated)
Mercedes-Benz	600 (SWB) (Note: Short wheelbase)	600 Pullman (LWB) (Note: Long wheelbase)
Production	1963–1981	
Engine	6.3 L V8 · front-mounted	
Bore x Stroke	103 mm (4.055 in) x 95 mm (3.740 in)	
Displacement	6,332 cc (386.4 cu in) (Note: 6,332.54 cc (386.44 cu in) rounded down to 6,332 cc (386.40 cu in))	
Max. Power @ rpm	250 PS (184 kW; 247 hp) (Note: DIN 70020 (German: Deutsche Industrie-Norm 70020)) @ 4000	
Max. Torque @ rpm	51 kp⋅m (500 N⋅m; 369 lb⋅ft) @ 2800	
Compression Ratio	9.00 : 1	
Fuel feed	Bosch intermittent 8-point mechanical fuel injection Bosch injection pump	
Fuel tank capacity	112 L (29.6 US gal; 24.6 imp gal)	
Valvetrain	single overhead camshaft (SOHC) · duplex chains	
Cooling	Water	
Transmission	4-speed automatic transmission K4B 050	
Gear Ratios	R: −4.145; 1: 3.979; 2: 2.520; 3: 1.579; 4: 1.000; Axle ratio: 3.231 (42:13)	
Electrical system	12 volt	
Front suspension	Double wishbones air suspension · rubber springs · stabilizing bar	
Rear suspension	Low-pivot swing axle · radius arms self-leveling air suspension · rubber springs · stabilizing bar	
Brakes	Disc brakes · power assisted Ø front discs: 291 mm (11.5 in) · two-caliper Ø rear discs: 294.5 mm (11.6 in)	
Steering	Recirculating ball steering · power assisted	
Body structure	Sheet steel · unibody construction	
Dry weight	2,600 kg (5,730 lb)	2,770 kg (6,110 lb)
Loaded weight	3,050 kg (6,720 lb)	3,340 kg (7,360 lb)
Track front	1,587 mm (62.5 in)	
Track rear	1,581 mm (62.2 in)	
Wheelbase	3,200 mm (126.0 in)	3,900 mm (153.5 in)
Length	5,540 mm (218.1 in)	6,240 mm (245.7 in)
Width	1,950 mm (76.8 in)	
Height	1,500 mm (59.1 in)	1,510 mm (59.4 in)
Tyre/Tire sizes	9.00H15 Supersport (6PR)	
Top speed	205 km/h (127 mph)	200 km/h (124 mph)
Fuel consumption	24.0 litres per 100 kilometres (11.8 mpg_{‑imp}; 9.8 mpg_{‑US}) (Note: petrol · 98 RON · estimates)	26.0 litres per 100 kilometres (10.9 mpg_{‑imp}; 9.0 mpg_{‑US})
Price Germany USA	1964: DM 56,500; 1979: DM 144,368; 1965: US-$ 22,000	1964: DM 63,500; 1979: DM 165,760; 1965: US-$ 24,000
