= WRG =

WRG may refer to:

- Wargames Research Group, UK publisher of games material
- Water-repellent glass for vehicles
- Waterway Recovery Group, co-ordinating voluntary labour on UK waterways
- World Radio Geneva, later World Radio Switzerland
- Wrangell Airport, IATA airport code
- Wescom Resources Group, credit union service organisation, Pasadena, California, US
