= Wescom Financial =

American credit union and financial services company

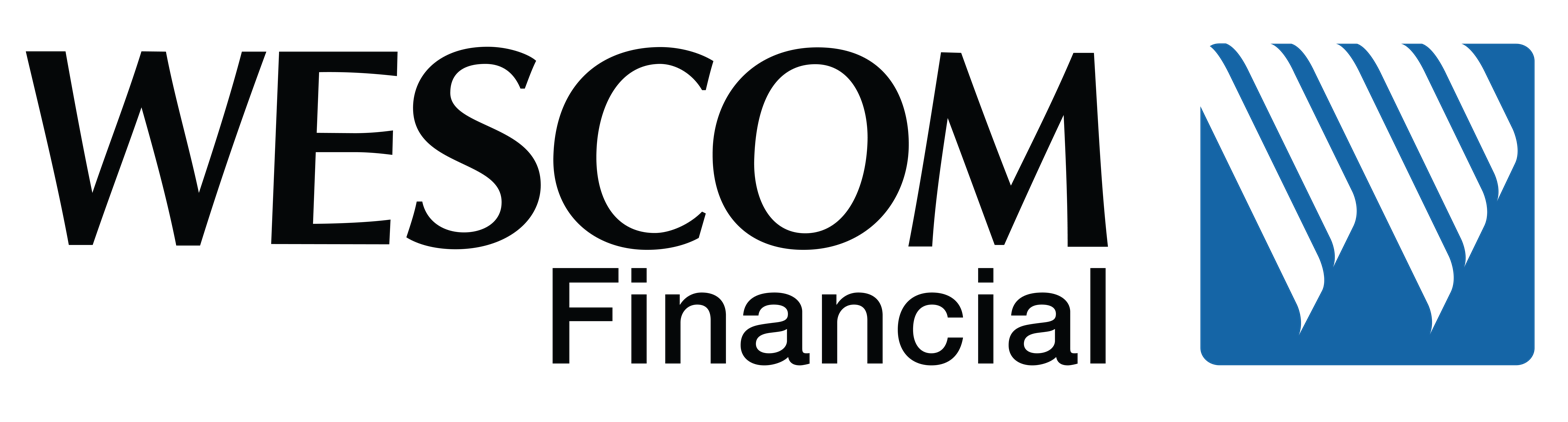
- Company type: Credit union
- Industry: Financial services
- Founded: 1934
- Headquarters: Pasadena, California, United States
- Key people: Darren Williams, President/CEO; Hani Bhimji, Board Chairman
- Products: Savings; checking; youth account; consumer loans; mortgages; credit cards; investments; insurance; online and mobile banking
- Total assets: $6.3 B USD (2026)
- Members: 250,000
- Number of employees: 881
- Website: wescom.org

Wescom Financial is a credit union and financial services company serving California. It has $6.3 billion in assets and more than 250,000 members. Wescom currently has 30 branches, throughout 21 counties, from Central California and Southern California.

Wescom Financial supports credit unions through Wescom Resources Group, a CUSO that provides technology products and services to credit unions across the United States.

Wescom was named one of "America’s Best Regional Banks and Credit Unions” by Newsweek in 2024, 2025, and 2026.

== History ==
The Credit Union was founded as Telephone Employees Credit Union in 1934 by 13 Pacific Telephone employees who wanted to help fellow telephone employees obtain hard to get loans. Starting with $65 in 1934, the Credit Union’s assets reached $282,000 in the 1940’s and $500 million in the 1980’s.

In 1996, the Credit Union changed its name to Wescom Credit Union. It primarily served the telecommunications industry until 1999, when its field of membership was expanded to allow anyone living, working, worshiping, or going to school in Los Angeles, Orange, Riverside, San Bernardino, and Ventura counties to join Wescom. Santa Barbara County was added to Wescom's field of membership in 2004, and San Diego County was added in 2005.

In 2023, it was announced that the Credit Union would merge with Central Coast Federal Credit Union of Monterey, California, extending its reach into the Central Coast of California.

In 2025, Wescom Credit Union updated its name to Wescom Financial to better represent its full range of financial services that extend beyond traditional credit union offerings.

== Branches and Services ==
Wescom Financial offers full service at its 30 branches throughout California, including branches on-campus at UCLA and near the main entrance at Knott’s Berry Farm. Drive-up ATMs are available at select branches: Anaheim, Hawthorne, Redlands, and Signal Hill.

In addition to the branches, Wescom’s “Big Blue” Mobile Branch is equipped to help members perform cashless account transactions, apply for new Wescom loans, request insurance quotes, and more.

Wescom Financial offers these services:

- Checking, savings, money market, certificates, and youth accounts
- Mortgages
- Home Equity Line of Credit
- Auto loans including green auto loans
- Credit Cards including UCLA Bruin Edge Visa^{®}, Knott’s Berry Farm Visa^{®}, Wescom MyReward Visa^{®}
- Student Loans
- Financial education and counseling
- Auto, homeowners, renters, life, health, and dental insurance
- Investment services

== Wescom Foundation ==
The Wescom Foundation is a charitable foundation created in 1999 by Wescom Financial employees with the goal of making California a better place through employee and member volunteerism and investment. Over 25 years, the Wescom Foundation has donated more than $6.4 million, with members contributing over $610,000 to its campaigns since 2020.

In 2025, the Wescom Foundation partnered with ForgiveCo to erase $10 million in consumer debt for residents impacted by the January 2025 Southern California wildfires. UCLA’s Coach Cori Close joined efforts to support Wescom’s relief efforts throughout the 2025-26 UCLA Women’s Basketball season, lending her voice through content creation and welcoming select beneficiaries to home games with her program.

== Official Partnerships ==
=== UCLA and Rose Bowl Stadium ===
Wescom Financial has a 10-year partnership as the exclusive banking partner for multiple facets of the collegiate community, focused on delivering financial education and resources to the extended Bruin family. Wescom Financial is the Official Banking Partner of:

- UCLA Athletics
- UCLA Alumni Association
- UCLA Campus Life and Recreation
- UCLA Dashew for International Students and Scholars
- Rose Bowl Stadium

Wescom Financial is also the sponsor of UCLA’s Financial Wellness Program and partner of ASUCLA.

In 2022, Wescom announced their first student-athlete partnership with UCLA Women’s Softball Student-Athlete Maya Brady. In 2023, Wescom Financial announced the first ever NIL partnership with the nationally ranked 2023–24 UCLA Bruins women's basketball team. In addition to the NIL partnership with all 12 student-athletes, Wescom partnered with the Michael Price Family UCLA Women’s Head Basketball Coach Cori Close.

Wescom also has a presence on campus as the official presenting sponsorship of Pauley Pavilion with signage reflecting “Edwin W. Pauley Pavilion presented by Wescom Financial.” Wescom also offers full service at the UCLA on-campus branch located in Ackerman Student Union and convenient access via the eight on-campus ATMs.

Wescom launched the UCLA Bruin Edge Visa^{®} Credit Card in 2021 and the UCLA-branded debit card in 2024.

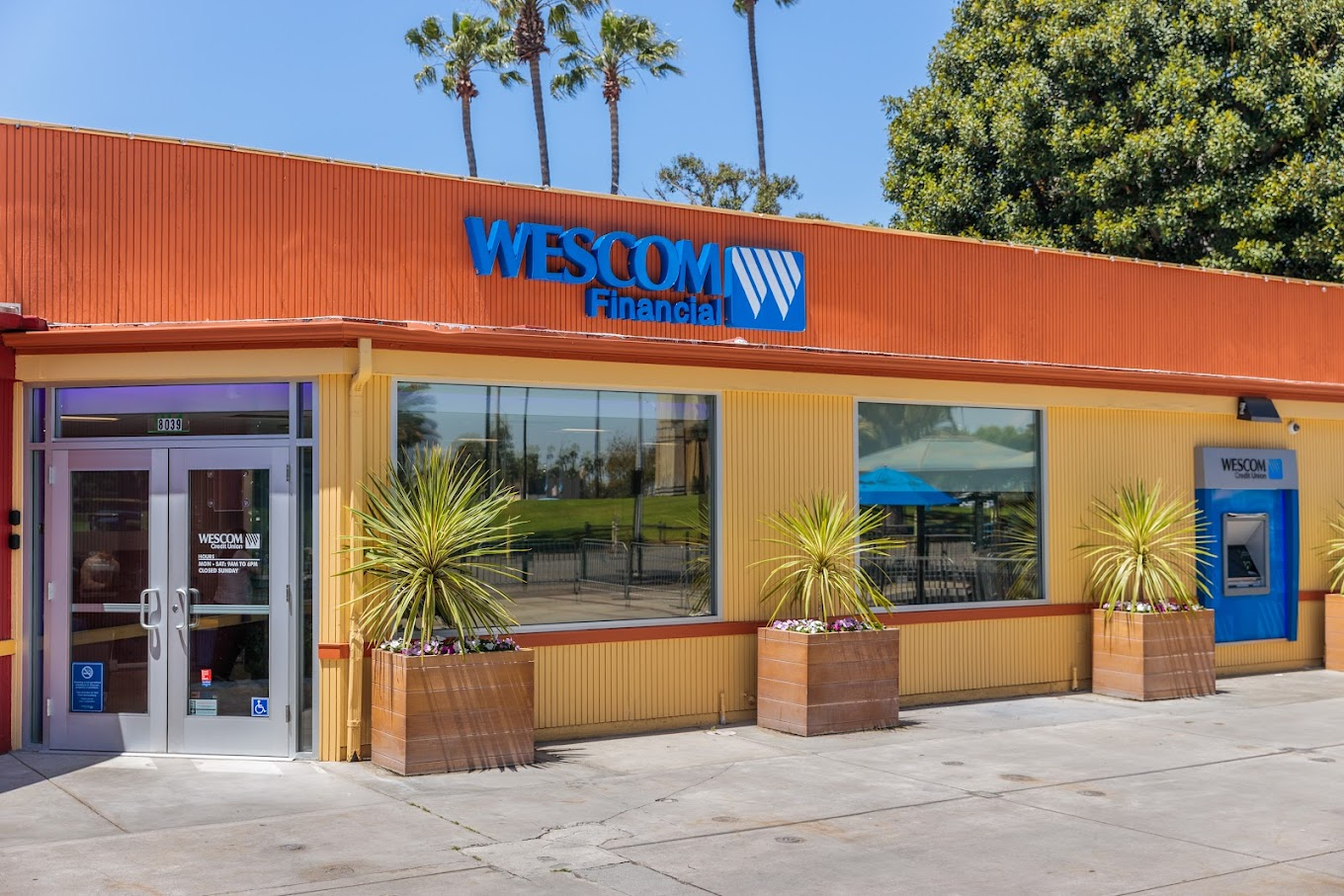
The Wescom Financial Knott's Berry Farm Branch is located next to the main entrance.

=== Knott's Berry Farm ===
In 2023, Wescom Financial announced an 8-year partnership with Knott’s Berry Farm, becoming the Official Banking Partner of Knott’s Berry Farm, Knott’s Soak City Water Park, Knott’s California Marketplace, and Knott’s Hotel. Bringing convenient banking to the theme park, Wescom opened the Knott’s Berry Farm Branch making it the 30th branch for the Credit Union.

In 2024, Wescom launched the Knott’s Berry Farm Visa^{®} Credit Card.

== Recognition ==
- Great Place to Work® Certification™ 2023-2024, 2024-2025
- Named “America's Best Regional Banks and Credit Unions” by Newsweek 2024, 2025
- Daily News Reader Choice Favorite 2023
- The Press Enterprise Best of Inland Empire 2023
- South Bay’s Favorite 2023
- San Gabriel Valley’s Favorite 2023
- LA Times Best of the Southland 2022
- The Orange County Register Best of Orange County 2022
- Daily News Readers Best Choice 2022
- The Press Enterprise Best of Inland Empire 2022
- Hey SoCal Reader's Choice Top 3 Credit Unions 2022
- Pasadena Weekly Best of Pasadena 2022
