= Water-repellent glass =

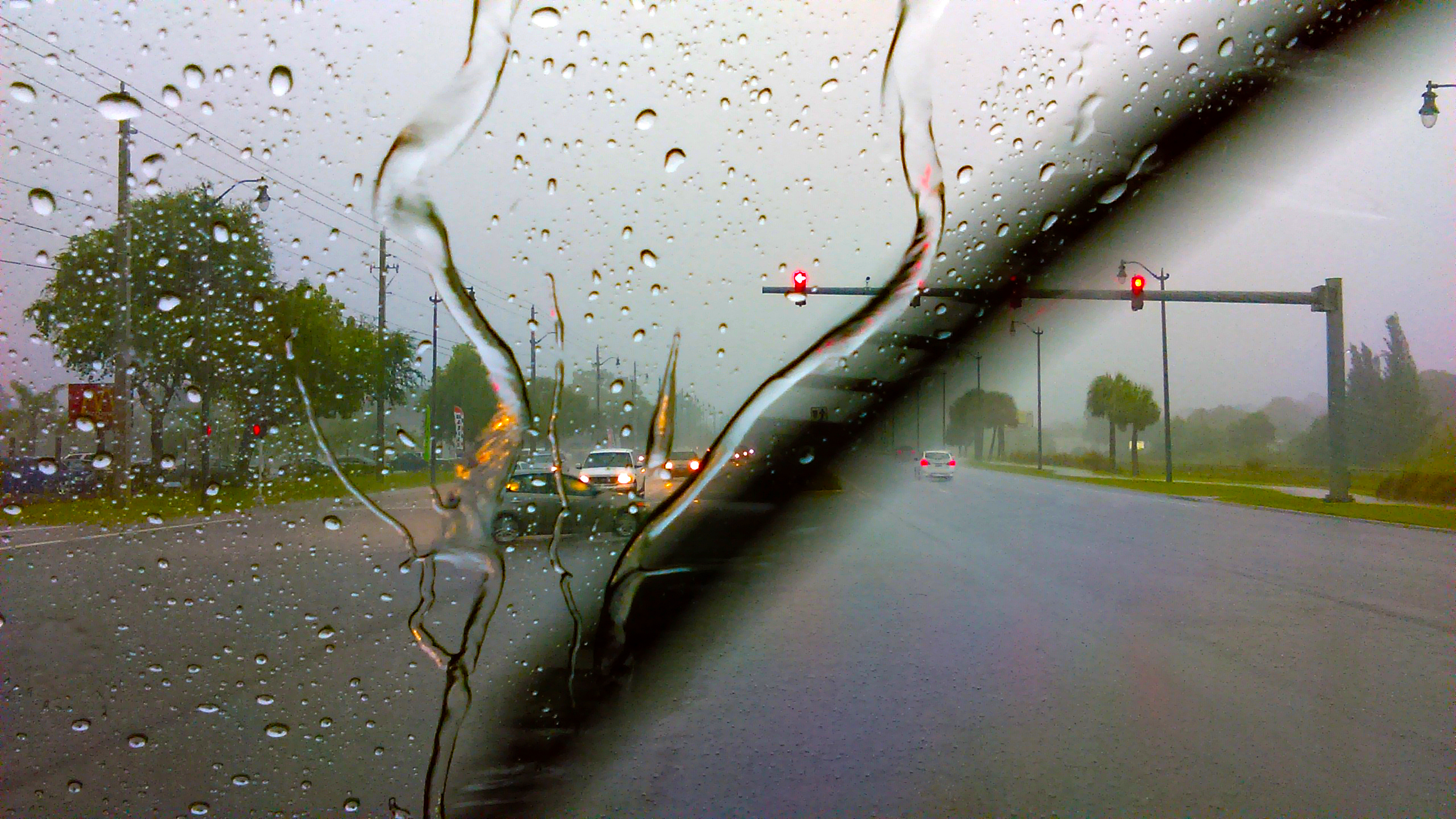
Water-repellent glass is often used to coat automobile windshields to increase visibility in rainy conditions.

Water-repellent glass (WRG) is a transparent coating film fabricated onto glass, enabling the glass to exhibit hydrophobicity and durability. WRGs are often manufactured out of materials including derivatives from per- and polyfluoroalkyl substances (PFAS), tetraethylorthosilicate (TEOS), polydimethylsilicone (PDMS), and fluorocarbons. In order to prepare WRGs, sol-gel processes involving dual-layer enrichments of large size glasses are commonly implemented.

Glasses enriched with WRG coatings prevent water droplets from sticking to the surface due to hydrophobic properties. These properties are achieved through high water-sliding property and high contact angles with water drops (over 100°). Additionally, durability against both chemical and mechanical attack allows the coating to protect the glass from abrasion due to windshield wipers, rainwater, and other weather conditions.

WRGs are most commonly used commercially for automobile windows to increase visibility in precipitous weather conditions and nighttime driving. In industry, WRG's were first used by Volvo Cars first on their late-2005 vehicles, and have also been used by Japanese automobile makers such as Toyota, Honda, and Mazda. Additionally, WRG has other practical applications such as eyewear and photocatalysts.

== Properties ==
=== Hydrophobicity ===
Hydrophobic properties of WRG glass windows are crucial to its repellency abilities.

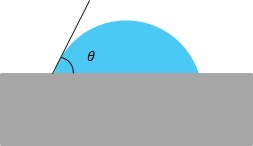
The contact angle of a water droplet on a glass surface determines how easily the water droplet can slide off of the glass. Higher contact angles indicate less contact between the water and glass, contributing to hydrophobicity.

High water-sliding property of WRG films is necessary for hydrophobicity. The higher the water-sliding angle, or angle of a surface in which a water droplet begins to slide down, the easier a water drop can slide down the film surface. A film's water-sliding angle is often dependent on the film coating substance. For instance, a study revealed that coating a WRG film with Fluoroalkylsilane (FAS) produced a higher water-sliding angle than coating with Polydimethylsilicone (PDMS).

High contact angles of over 100 degrees are associated with more effective water-repellency properties. The greater the contact angle between the water droplet and glass surface, the less the contact between the water and the glass, and the easier the water droplet can slide off of the glass. This can be achieved by increasing surface roughness, since the contact angle becomes larger as surface particles become larger.

=== Mechanical durability ===
Water-repellent films' mechanical durability properties are dependent on state of the surface roughness of the film and density of adsorbed water-repellent molecules. Mechanical durability of WRG can be characterized as wear and weather resistance, an important attribute for manufacturing automobile windows.

The greater the surface roughness, the more resistant the film will be to abrasion. Average surface roughness of a glass substrate indicates the size of surface particles, is measured using an atomic force microscope (AFM), and recorded in nanometers. A study analyzed different samples of silica films and found minimum and maximum surface roughnesses of 0.4 and 16.1 nm respectively. Surface roughnesses greater than 8 nm are considered large. After rubbing each sample with a flannel cloth, the study was able to determine each's resistance against wear. Films with higher surface roughnesses exhibit the highest mechanical durability. Additionally, films formed on top of silica were more durable than films formed on soda-lime glass.

The WRG's mechanical durability can also be increased by a larger density of reaction sites per surface area. An increased density of reaction sites on the film is also a result of a higher surface roughness. This works to increase durability since a higher density means more rigid chemical bonds. For instance, forming a WRG film out of polyfluoroalkyl isocyanate creates a surface with siloxane bonding. There exists a direct correlation between the density of silanol groups on the film surface and the adhesion density of the film.

== Production ==
=== Sol-gel process ===
The sol-gel process is a common method of preparing water-repellent glass coating films done with various materials and often resulting in dual-layer films. This process is advantageous for automobile window applications since it works with large, curved safety glasses and allows qualities such as durability and hydrophobicity to be controlled.

In a study done by the University of Massachusetts, the sol-gel process was employed to prepare a dual-layer film using layers composed of silica and fluorocarbon. The silica layer was selected to enhance durability and placed at the glass-film interface, while the fluorocarbon layer was placed at the film-air interface and incorporated a specific surface roughness into the design. The process involved the following distinct steps: preparing both the silica sol and water-repellent solutions, spraying the solution onto the glass, treating the glass through drying, and treating through heating.

In addition, the Nippon Sheet Glass Co. in Japan discussed a sol-gel treatment involving fluoroalkylsilane (FAS) and polydimethylsilicone (PDMS). Both materials were mixed with catalysts in solvents, fabricated onto glasses, and dried. The use of the sol-gel treatment allowed for flexibility in experimenting with contact angle, sliding angle, and durability. The study pointed out that this process could be also used in automobile industry.

== Applications ==
The table below provides an overview of some notable applications of WRG films.

Application	Researchers and Manufacturers	Commercial Use
Automobile windows and mirrors	University of Massachusetts; Asahi Glass Co; Central Glass	Honda (Legend), Mazda (Family Wagon), Nissan (Stagea, Cefiro, Cima), Toyota (Celsio and Soarer), Volvo
Eyewear	Nasho	Essilor
Photocatalysts	University of Tokyo; Central Glass; Institute of Infrastructure, Technology, Research and Management, Ahmedabad; Technical Institute of Physics and Chemistry (TIPC)	Nippon Sheet Glass (CLEARTECT); Ube-Nitto Kasei Company (HYDRAP); Hydrasol; Solar Sharc; Element 119 (System X Solar Panel Ceramic Coating)

=== Automobile windows and mirrors ===
WRG is commonly used as a coating for windows and mirrors of automobiles in order to increase visibility through wicking away rainwater, snow, and dirt. Several millions of WRG windows have already been manufactured and installed in industry. For instance, Central Glass Company developed a hydrophobic glass film exhibiting excellent repellency, durability, and transparency. Many Japanese automobile companies including Honda and Mazda are selling cars with these glass films. Additionally, water-repellent coatings are being applied to automobile side mirrors.

=== Eyewear ===
The eyeglass industry is also moving toward implementing water and dust repellent glasses to decrease fogging due to rain, sweat, and other water sources. When glasses experience condensation, the small water droplets begin scattering light, impairing the vision of the glasses wearer. The eyecare company Nasho is innovating toward WRG technology to improve vision, but is currently limited financially for the research and development.

=== Photocatalysts ===
Photocatalyst coatings allow for the self-cleaning of surfaces of road signs, building materials, and solar panels. Multiple photocatalyst WRG film such as CLEARTECT and HYDRAP have been commercialized.

A WRG film can be added on top of solar panels in order to increase their efficiency. The cover glass technology is self-cleaning, allowing for maximized light transmission into the solar cell. The hydrophobic film acts as a barrier that causes water droplets to roll off the solar panel, rather than adhering and blocking sunlight from being absorbed. Solar panels enhanced with anti-reflective, water-repellent layers show a 6.6% increase in performance when compared to those without a coating.
