= Toyota Curren =

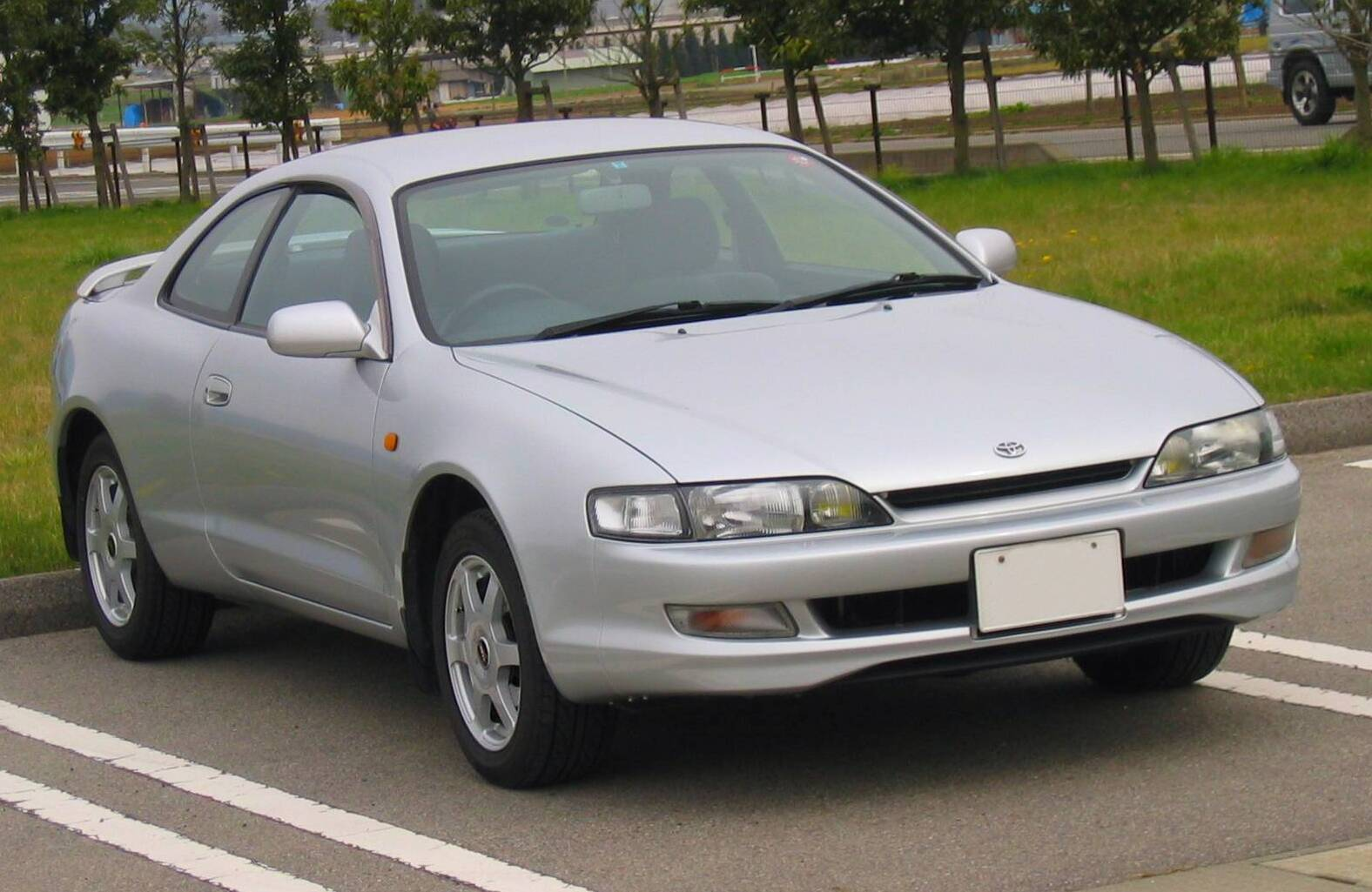
- 1996 Toyota Curren (ST206, facelift)

Overview
- Manufacturer: Toyota
- Model code: T200
- Production: January 1994 – July 1998 (42,000 units)
- Assembly: Japan: Tahara, Aichi (Tahara plant)

Body and chassis
- Class: Sport compact
- Body style: 2-door coupé
- Layout: Front-engine, front-wheel-drive
- Related: Toyota Celica (T200); Toyota Celica GT-Four (ST205); Toyota Corona (T190); Toyota Corona EXiV (T200); Toyota Carina (T190); Toyota Carina ED (T200)

Powertrain
- Engine: 1.8 L 4S-FE I4 (petrol); 2.0 L 3S-FE I4 (petrol); 2.0 L 3S-GE I4 (petrol)
- Power output: 92 kW (123 hp; 125 PS) (4S-FE); 103 kW (138 hp; 140 PS) (3S-FE); 125–132 kW (168–177 hp; 170–179 PS) (3S-GE)
- Transmission: 5-speed manual; 4-speed automatic

Dimensions
- Wheelbase: 2,535 mm (99.8 in)
- Length: 4,490 mm (176.8 in)
- Width: 1,750 mm (68.9 in)
- Height: 1,310 mm (51.6 in)
- Kerb weight: 1,110–1,210 kg (2,447–2,668 lb)

Chronology
- Predecessor: Toyota Corona Coupé (T160)

The Toyota Curren (Japanese: トヨタ・カレン, Toyota Karen) is a sport compact coupé built by Toyota from 1994 to 1998. It is based on the T200 series Celica chassis. It shared the same interior and rear end design as the Celica coupé. Instead of having four round headlamps like the Celica, it has a rectangular headlamp design providing a more traditional halogen headlamp appearance. Modifying the appearance of the Celica allowed Toyota to sell the Curren at Toyota Vista Store locations, as the Celica was exclusive to Corolla Store locations. The Curren directly replaced the T160 series Corona Coupé, which was exclusive to Toyopet Store locations.

The name "Curren" is derived from English word "current".

== Model history ==
=== 1994–1995 ===
In 1994, the Curren was available in two models, the ST206 and ST207. The ST206 model had four different trim levels. The FS, XS, ZS and ZS Sport Selection. The FS and XS trims were both powered by the 103 kW (138 hp; 140 PS) 2.0 L 3S-FE engine, whereas the ZS trims were powered by the 125–132 kW (168–177 hp; 170–179 PS) 2.0 L 3S-GE engine. The ZS Sport Selection trim had the added benefit of a limited-slip differential and leather steering wheel. The ST207 only came in the XS Touring Selection trim, which was powered by the 3S-FE engine and came equipped with four-wheel steering and Toyota's active suspension package called TACS, which was a technology improvement of the previous TEMS.

In 1995, the XS and ZS S-Package trims were introduced which included a rear spoiler, rear wiper, alloy wheels and slightly more power output on the ZS trims. The later model, the ST208, was introduced as a base model to the lineup. It had two trim levels, the TS and TS Private Selection which included a rear wiper and a rear spoiler. Both trim levels were powered by the 92 kW (123 hp; 125 PS) 1.8 L 4S-FE engine.

=== 1996–1998 ===
In 1996, the Curren received a facelift that included redesigned front bumper, clear front turn signals and redesigned front grille. It also received redesigned taillamps that had a darker tint and clear turn signals, while the 1994 model had the same design with orange turn signals as the ones on the pre-facelift Japanese Celica Convertible ST202C and all the export markets Celica GT Convertible.

In 1997, the four-wheel steering ST207 model was discontinued. The rest of the models remained unchanged until it ended production in July 1998. In September 1998, sales of the Curren ended with a total of 42,000 units.

=== TRD Sports Version ===
In late 1995 Toyota introduced the Toyota Curren TRD Sports version. Based on the Toyota Curren ZS Sport Selection, the TRD Sports included various interior and exterior modifications from TRD to include a TRD muffler, TRD rear wing, TRD front bumper, TRD leather shift knob, and a TRD TRDSPORTS steering wheel with TRD horn. Other standard items include a carbon fiber-like interior trim package, a gray gauge cluster with orange backlighting and gray accents surrounding the gauges. The TRD Sports Curren was available with a 5-speed manual with an LSD or a 4-speed automatic transmission. The 5-speed manual transmission received a helical limited-slip differential as standard. The Toyota Curren TRD Sports was limited to 300 units for the Japanese market.

== Gallery ==
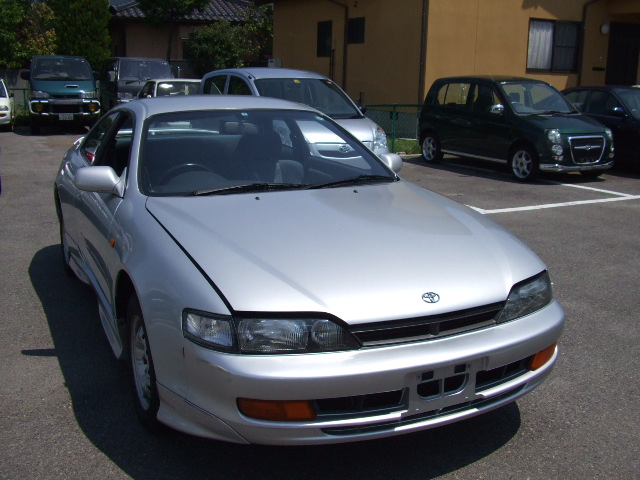
Front view (pre-facelift)

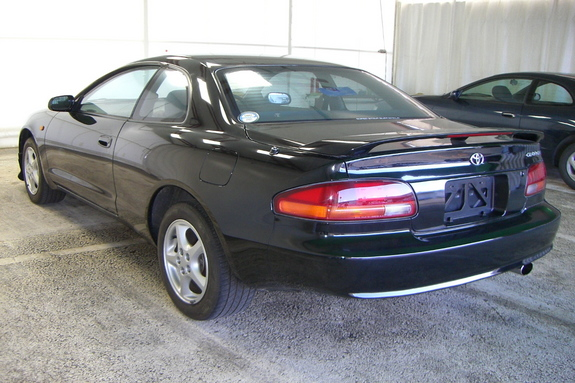
Rear view (pre-facelift)

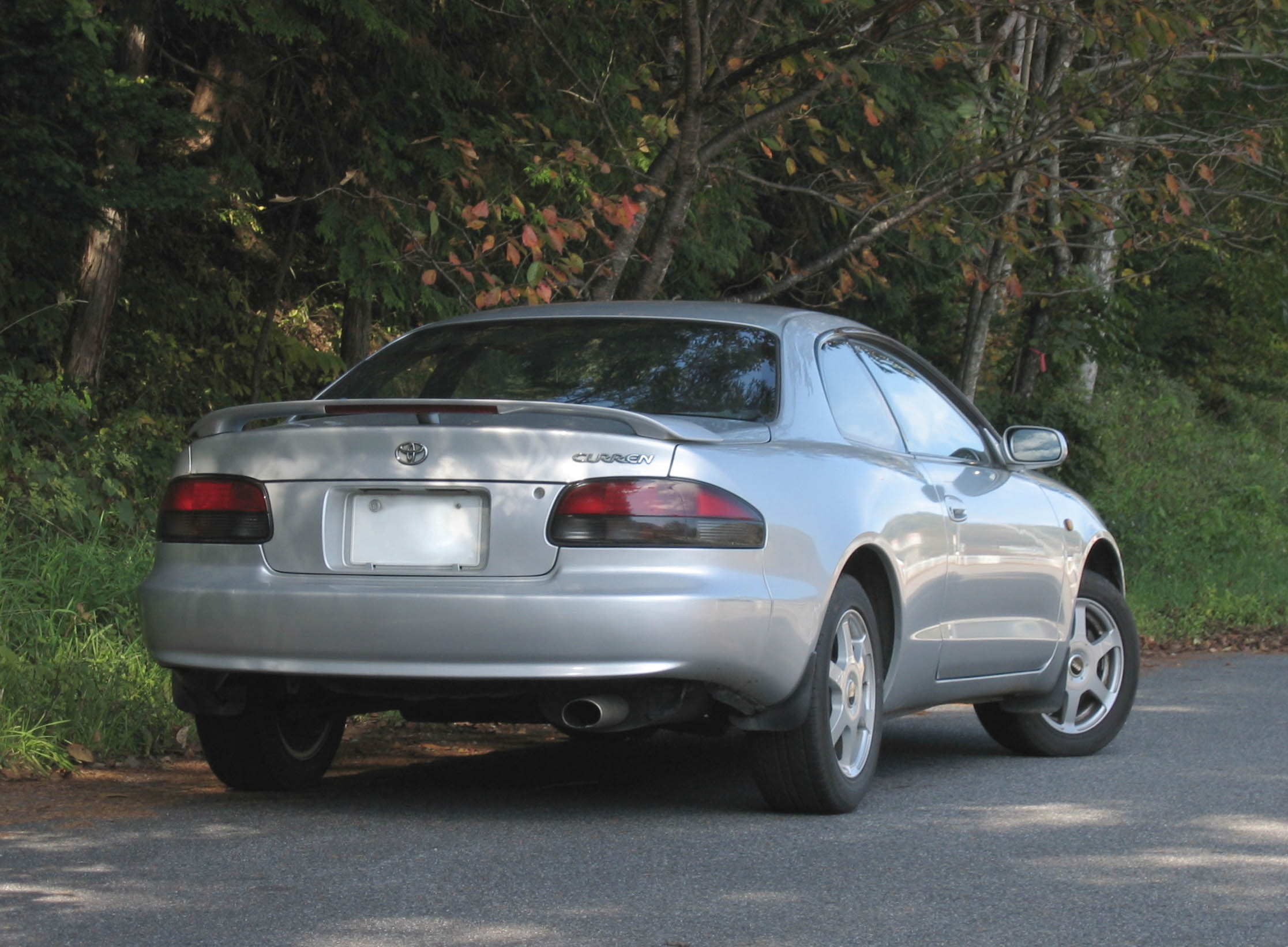
Rear view (facelift)

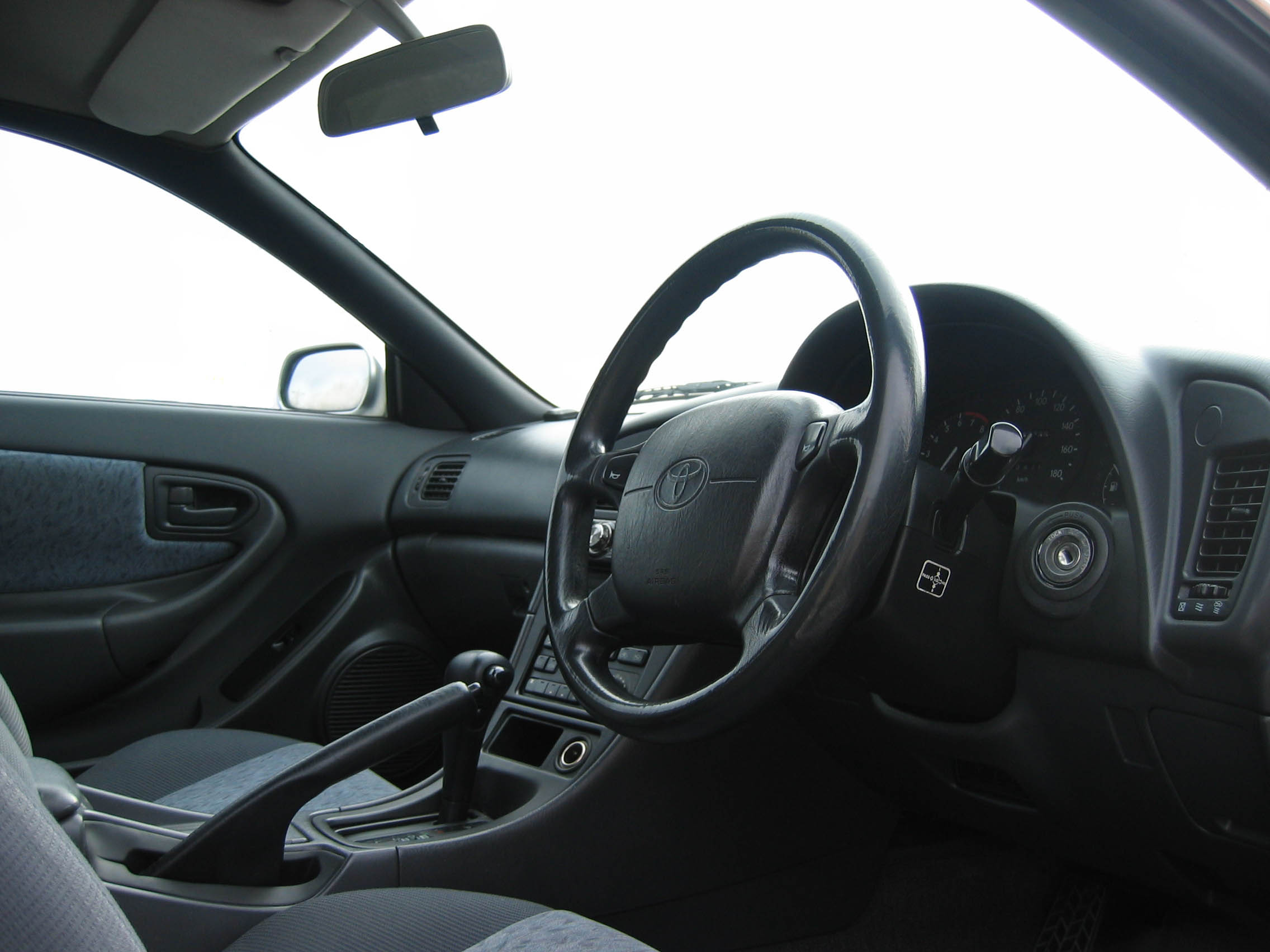
Interior

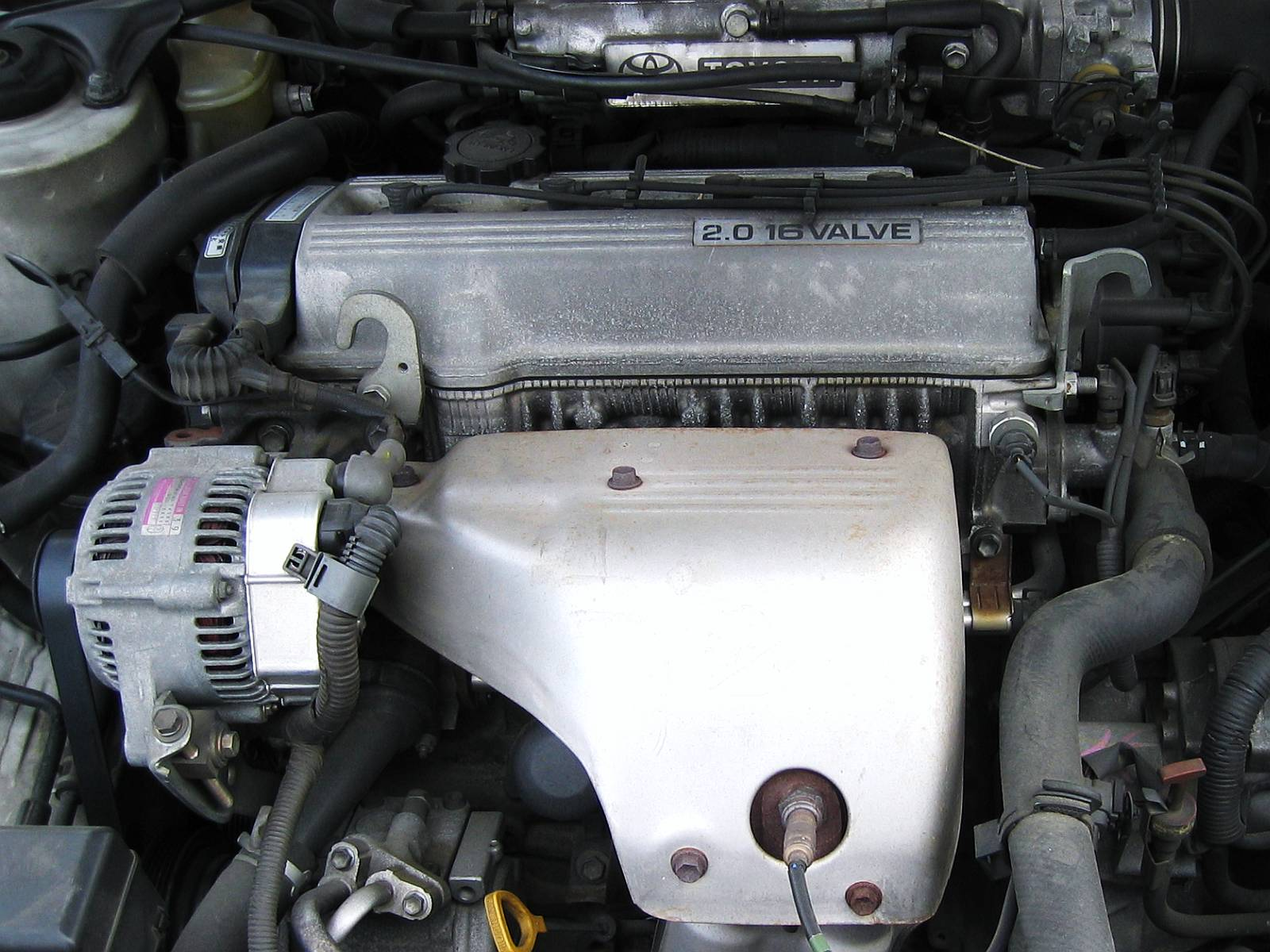
3S-FE engine in the 1996 Curren XS
