= Toyota Electronic Modulated Suspension =

Electronically-controlled shock absorber

TEMS (Toyota Electronic Modulated Suspension) is a shock absorber that is electronically controlled (Continuous Damping Control) based on multiple factors, and was built and exclusively used by Toyota for selected products during the 1980s and 1990s (first introduced on the Toyota Soarer in 1983). The semi-active suspension system was widely used on luxury and top sport trim packages on most of Toyota's products sold internationally. Its popularity fell after the "bubble economy" as it was seen as an unnecessary expense to purchase and maintain, and remained in use on luxury or high performance sports cars.

== Summary ==
TEMS consisted of four shock absorbers mounted at all four wheels, and could be used in either an automatic or driver selected mode based on the installation of the system used. The technology was installed on top-level Toyota products with four wheel independent suspension, labeled PEGASUS (Precision Engineered Geometrically Advanced SUSpension). Because of the nature of the technology, TEMS was installed on vehicles with front and rear independent suspensions. The technology was modified and installed on minibuses or minivans like Toyota TownAce/MasterAce rear independent suspensions, and the top trim package on the Toyota HiAce.

Based on road conditions, the system would increase or decrease ride damping force for particular situations. The TEMS system was easily installed to suit ride comfort, and road handling stability on small suspensions, adding a level of ride modification found on larger, more expensive luxury vehicles. The technology was originally developed and calibrated for Japanese driving conditions due to Japanese speed limits, but was adapted for international driving conditions with later revisions.

As the Japanese recession of the early 1990s began to take effect, the system was seen as an unnecessary expense as buyers were less inclined to purchase products and services seen as "luxury" and more focused on basic needs. TEMS installation was still achieved on vehicles that were considered luxurious, like the Toyota Crown, Toyota Century, Toyota Windom, and the Toyota Supra and Toyota Soarer sports cars.

Recently the technology has been installed on luxury minivans like the Toyota Alphard, Toyota Noah and the Toyota Voxy.

The TEMS system has been recently named "Piezo TEMS" (with piezoelectric ceramics), "Skyhook TEMS" "Infinity TEMS" and more recently "AVS" (Adaptive Variable Suspension).

== Configuration settings ==
The system was deployed with an earlier two-stage switch labeled "Auto-Sport", with a later modification of "Auto-Soft-Mid-Hard". Some variations used a dial to specifically select the level of hardness to the driver's desires. For most driving situations, the "Auto" selection was recommended. When the system was activated, an indicator light reflected the suspension setting selected. The system components consisted of a control switch, indicator light, four shock absorbers, shock absorber control actuator, shock absorber control computer, vehicle speed sensor, stop lamp switch, with a throttle position sensor and a steering angle sensor on TEMS three stage systems only. All the absorbers are controlled with the same level of hardness.

== Operation parameters of TEMS ==
The following describes how the system would activate on the earlier version installed during the 1980s on two stage TEMS

- During normal running 100 km/h (62 mph)

The system chooses the "SOFT" selection, to provide a softer ride.

- At high speeds 85–100 km/h (53–62 mph)

The system selects the "HARD" selection and determines that at high speeds, it assumes a more rigid configuration for better ride stability, and to reduce roll tendencies.

- Braking (reducing speed to 50 km/h (31 mph))

In order to prevent "nose dive", the process proceeds to "HARD" automatically damping force until it senses the brakes to be at the"SOFT" setting. It will return to the "SOFT" state when the brake light is off, and the pedal has been released after 2 seconds or more.

- (Only 3-stage systems) during hard acceleration

To suppress suspension "squat" the system switches to "HARD" based on accelerator pedal position and throttle position.

- (Only 3-stage systems) during hard cornering

To suppress suspension "roll" the system switches to "HARD" based on steering angle sensor position.

- SPORT mode

The system remains in the "HARD" position regardless of driving conditions. (For 3-stage systems, the system automatically chooses between the "MID" and the "HARD" configurations - by the other words, the "SOFT" stage is excepted)

== Vehicles installed ==
The following is a list of vehicles in Japan that were installed with the technology. There may have been vehicles exported internationally that were also equipped.

- Starlet (EP71-based Turbo S, EP82-based GT)
- Tercel / Corsa / Corolla II (EL31-based GP turbo)
- Cynos
- Sera
- Corolla Levin / Sprinter Trueno (AE92 • AE101GT GT-APEX)
- Corolla FX (AE92-GT)
- Corona (ST171-based GT-R)
- Celica (ST183 models)
- Carina ED and Corona EXiV (ST180 models)
- Century
- Crown Majesta
- Camry / Vista (SV20-based GT and Prominent G, SV30-based GT)
- Pronard
- Aristo (S140)
- Town Ace / Master Ace
- Lite Ace
- Mark II / Chaser / Cresta (GX71-based Twin Cam Grande, GX81-based Twin Cam Grande system, JZX91 Grande G, JZX100 Grande G, JZX101 Grande G, JZX110 Grande G)
- Windom (MCV10 system G, MCV20 system G, MCV30 system G)
- Hiace
- Hilux Surf (KZN130)
- Hilux Surf (KZN185))
- Crown
- Soarer (GZ20 system 2.0GT Twin turbo L, JZZ30 system 2.5GT twin turbo L)
- Soarer (1UZ-FE V8 UZZ31).
- Supra (Select Models)
- Celsior: Piezo TEMS
- Noah / Voxy
- Alphard
- Land Cruiser (100 series)
- Ipsum (acm20 system)

== Super Strut (MacPherson modified strut) ==
Super strut suspension is a high-performance suspension for automobiles developed by Toyota. On vehicles equipped, the abbreviation listed was "SSsus" and was first installed on the AE101 Corolla Levin / Sprinter Trueno for 1991 .

=== Overview ===
This is a MacPherson strut type suspension that has been improved to compete with double wishbone type suspensions. It suppressed the change in camber angle that occurs when the suspension is in motion, and as a result it greatly increases handling stability and grip limit while turning. For front wheel drive sports coupes, there arose a need for an inexpensive upgrade that could be installed on vehicles that originally had MacPherson struts on the front wheels.

In contrast to the traditional L-shaped lower control arm used with MacPherson struts, Super Strut had a lower control arm divided into two parts, one of which is equipped with a camber control arm, which is connected to a specially shaped strut. As a result, a virtual kingpin axis was set inside the tire, making it possible to significantly reduce the kingpin angle from 14 degrees to 6 degrees and the spindle offset from 66 mm to 18 mm. As a result, the torque steer that is noticeable in high-output front-engine, front-wheel drive vehicles equipped with LSD is reduced. Active use of ball joints also ensures rigidity and reduces friction.

The camber control arm regulates the movement of the lower arm, so when the suspension reacts to an uneven road surface, the upper part of the upright pulls inward, causing the camber angle to change negatively. Note that the inclination of the strut body may be opposite to that of the MacPherson strut type.

While there are various advantages, there are also disadvantages. The unsprung suspension weight is heavier than the general MacPherson strut, and depending on the car model, the minimum turning radius would be increased. There are also conditions where the steering feels uncomfortable as the steering angle increases. Furthermore, because the effective range of motion of the short camber control arm is narrow, the amount of suspension travel is also affected. The behavior is stable due to the unique characteristic of camber change, when the suspension travel is minimal, and the camber change is also minimal, and when the camber control arm reaches a certain angle, the camber change is suddenly increased. Due to the narrow vehicle height range, it was not favorable to off-road driving conditions.

Although the above disadvantages were not a problem in ordinary cars where the road surface conditions did not change much and the vehicle speed was slow, the setting range that is considered best in high speed racing conditions where limited performance is necessary and required flexibility. Therefore, in the category where suspension changes are allowed, there were cases where the structure was simple, there was accumulated know-how, and the suspension was replaced with a conventional strut, which was easier to handle.

=== Vehicles installed ===
- Corolla Levin / Sprinter Trueno (AE92 • AE101GT• BZ-R)
- Corolla FX (AE101)
- Toyota Celica (T200) SS-II, SS-III (ST202)
- Celica GT-Four (ST205)
- Toyota Celica (T230) SS-II (ZZT231)
- Curren (ST206)
- Carina E (ST190 series) (export)
- Carina ED (ST200 series)
- Corona EXiV (ST200 series)

== See also ==
- Active Stabilizer Suspension System
- Kinetic Dynamic Suspension System
- Toyota Active Control Suspension
- Active Body Control
