= Toyota Active Control Suspension =

Toyota Active Control Suspension was (according to Toyota) the world's first fully active suspension.

Two versions of Toyota's Active Control Suspension system went into production - the first was a very limited production run from 1990 to 1991 of 300 units of the ST183 Celica, called the Active Sports. This was the first production car in the world to utilise an active suspension system. The suspension employed conventional coil-spring struts and 4-wheel steering. No anti-roll (stabiliser) bars were fitted as the strut damping was actively controlled by a combined power steering/suspension fluid pump and valve body that counteracted roll and pitch forces. This system of controlling damping force while utilising conventional springs was largely achieved with the much simpler Toyota Electronic Modulated Suspension system (TEMS).

The second version of the Active Suspension system came with the UZZ32 Soarer produced between 1991 and 1996. It was a complex, computer-controlled system that removed both conventional springs and anti-roll (stabiliser) bars in favour of fully hydropneumatic struts controlled by an array of sensors (such as axis accelerometers, suspension height and wheel speed) that detected cornering, acceleration and braking forces. The system worked well and gave an unusually controlled yet smooth ride with no body roll. However, the additional weight and power requirements of the system affected straight-line performance somewhat. Due to the complexity and cost of the UZZ32 Soarer, only 873 were produced.

Mercedes-Benz introduced a very similar active suspension, called Active Body Control, on the Mercedes-Benz CL-Class in 1999.

== Vehicles ==
- Toyota Celica GT-R based "Active Sports" (ST183) 1990-1991
- Toyota Soarer (UZZ32) 1991–1996
- Toyota Curren (ST207) 1994-1995 XS Touring Selection

== See also ==
- Active Body Control
- Toyota Electronic Modulated Suspension
