= Wescom Resources Group =

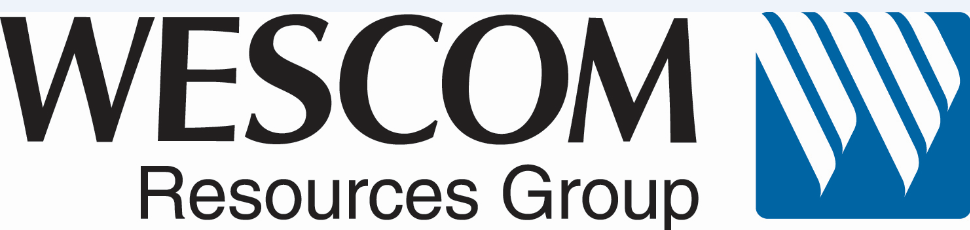
- Type: Credit union service organization
- Industry: Financial services
- Founded: 2002; 24 years ago
- Headquarters: Pasadena, California,, United States
- Key people: Dave Cerwinski, President; Patti Quinteros, Director – Projects & Implementation; Kerry Schiappa, Director – Sales & Marketing
- Products: Service bureau, Application Hosting Services, POS Software
- Website: wescomresources.com

Wescom Resources Group (WRG) is an American wholly owned subsidiary of Wescom Credit Union that operates as a credit union service organization (CUSO) headquartered in Pasadena, California, providing technology products and services to credit unions in the United States. WRG primarily delivers its services from its Operations Center located in Anaheim, California.

== History ==
Wescom Resources Group was formed in 2002 as a CUSO of Wescom Financial to supply credit unions seeking similar technology products that Wescom Credit Union had developed for its membership. Initially, the CUSO's products and services included Online Banking, Bill Pay, Automated Lending, and New Member Application. Each of these leveraged Wescom's use of integration techniques to the Episys host financial system from Symitar, now a division of Jack Henry, Inc. In addition, the CUSO offered a hosted Service Bureau platform for some of its initial clients.

The first services Wescom Resources Group (WRG) offered to credit unions in the Southern California area was ATM Deposit Processing, with Kinecta FCU being WRG's first ATM Deposit Processing client in October 2002.

In 2003, John Best joined WRG to lead development projects in home electronic banking, and by 2009 led the WRG development team to completing its first mobile banking app. Wescom was among the first credit unions to deploy a native smart phone app on the then nascent Android operating system. Best formed the WRG Mobile Advisory Group consisting of a small number of prominent credit unions to foster additional collaboration between WRG and its clients. In 2014, Best left WRG.

== Services ==
Wescom Resources Group's flagship product, Unitri Service Bureau, delivers outsourced core processing, back-office automation, network and application connectivity, and data storage, backup and security to its client credit unions. The platform operates on two third-party host processing systems – Keystone, by Corelation Inc. and Episys, by Symitar, a division of Jack Henry & Associates. WRG provides Unitri Service Bureau data processing to approximately 40 credit unions.

Tellergy, WRG's most recent product, is an interactive teller station application that resides on a multimedia digital display device from Verifone.

=== Services ===
- Service Bureau processing
- Retail point-of-sale terminals
- Custom Programming services
