= Toyota Soarer =

Personal luxury car/grand tourer made by Toyota

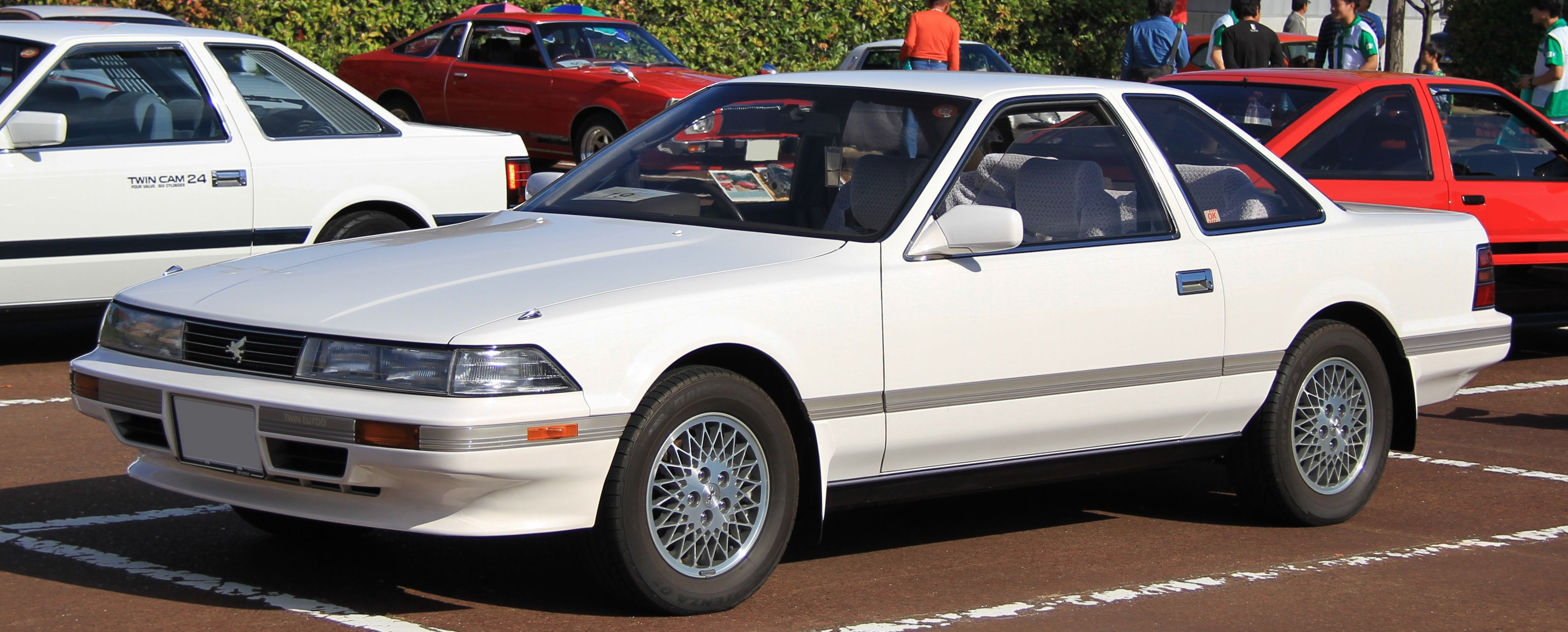
- 1988 Toyota Soarer 2.0GT Twin Turbo (GZ20)

Overview
- Manufacturer: Toyota
- Also called: Lexus SC (1991–2010)
- Production: February 1981 – July 2005 (the succeeding SC nameplate continued production until July 2010)
- Assembly: Japan: Tahara, Aichi (Tahara plant, February 1981 – February 1991); Toyota City, Aichi (Motomachi plant, April 1991 – April 1997); Susono, Shizuoka (Higashi Fuji plant, commenced March 1989)

Body and chassis
- Class: Grand tourer; Personal luxury car
- Layout: Front-engine, rear-wheel-drive

Chronology
- Predecessor: Toyota Mark II coupé (X30/X40); Toyota Chaser coupé (X30/X40); Toyota Crown coupé (S110); Toyota Carina coupé (A40)
- Successor: Lexus SC 430 (Japan, 2005)

The Toyota Soarer (Japanese: トヨタ・ソアラ, Hepburn: Toyota Soara) is a personal luxury GT coupé produced from 1981 to 2005 by Toyota and sold in Japan. It was available at both Japanese Toyota dealerships called Toyota Store and Toyopet Store, and it debuted with the Z10 series, replacing the Toyopet Store exclusive Mark II coupé, the Toyota Auto Store exclusive Chaser coupé, and both the Toyota Store exclusive Crown coupé and Carina coupé.

In 1986, the Z20 series Soarer was launched, based on the then-new A70 series Supra platform, which was exclusive to Toyota Corolla Store locations. In 1991, the Z30 series Soarer premiered in Japan, while its Lexus equivalent, the SC 300/400, debuted in the US market (where the Soarer nameplate was not available).

Soarer logo

While externally identical to the SC, the Z30 series Soarer lineup offered different powertrain specifications and multiple unique vehicle configurations. In 2001, Toyota introduced a convertible-only successor in Japan as the Z40 series Soarer and elsewhere as the SC 430. In contrast to the previous series, the Z40 series Soarer and SC were based on a single model and were largely equivalent. In 2005, following the introduction of Lexus in Japan, the Soarer name and emblem were discontinued, and the Z40 model became the SC 430 in common with worldwide markets.

When introduced in Japan, the Soarer competed with the Nissan Skyline, Nissan Leopard, and Mazda Cosmo coupés and served as Toyota's halo car, often introducing new technologies before they were installed on other Toyota products. All versions of the Soarer featured a unique winged lion emblem (often mistakenly called a Griffin) as the logo throughout the vehicle.

== First generation (1981–1985) ==
Toyota Soarer
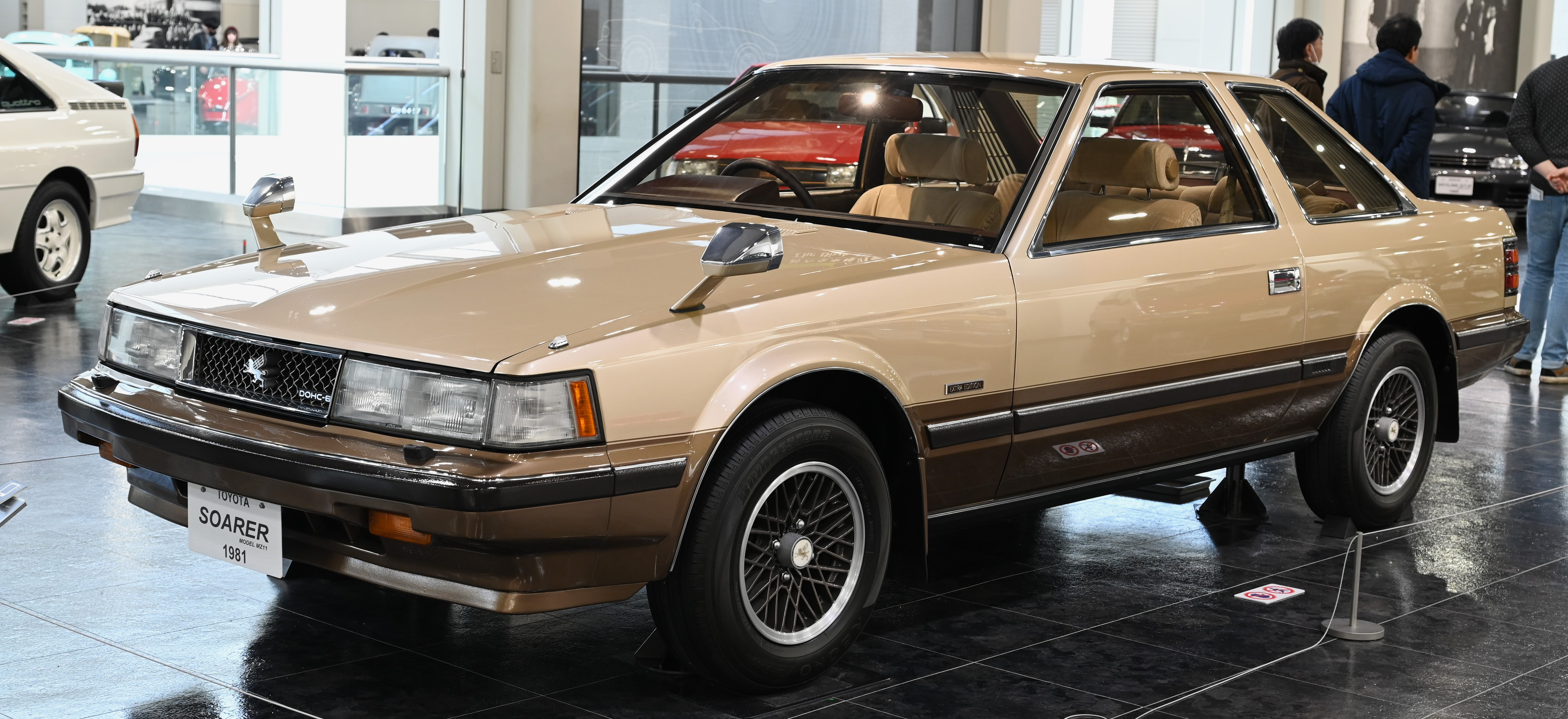
- 1981 Toyota Soarer 2.8GT Extra (MZ11)

Overview
- Model code: Z10
- Production: 1981–1985

Body and chassis
- Body style: 2-door coupé
- Related: Toyota Carina A60; Toyota Celica A60; Toyota Supra A60

Powertrain
- Engine: 2.0 L 1G-EU I6; 2.0 L 1G-GEU I6; 2.0 L M-TEU turbo I6 (after 1983); 2.8 L 5M-GEU I6; 3.0 L 6M-GEU I6
- Transmission: 5-speed R154 manual (5M-GEU); 5-speed W57 manual (1G-GEU); 4-speed A340E automatic

Dimensions
- Wheelbase: 2,660 mm (104.7 in)
- Length: 4,655 mm (183.3 in)
- Width: 1,695 mm (66.7 in)
- Height: 1,360 mm (53.5 in)
- Curb weight: 1,220–1,580 kg (2,690–3,483 lb)

The Soarer, introduced as the EX-8, first appeared at the 1980 Osaka International Motor Show. At its introduction in 1981, it won the Car of the Year Japan Award. Toyota sought to introduce a grand touring coupe, offering a powerful straight-six engine, luxurious accommodations, and a modern, aerodynamic appearance. Internationally, personal luxury cars were popular in the West, and Toyota saw an opportunity to offer the same type of car to Japanese buyers. The Soarer complied with Japanese external dimension regulations, and the first-generation models were classified as "compacts," which gave Japanese buyers tax-saving advantages. The engine displacements were also limited to above 2 liters but below 3 liters, so Japanese buyers could determine how much annual road tax they were willing to pay.

It debuted with a rear-wheel-drive configuration based on the A60 Supra, which utilized MacPherson struts for the front, with a semi-trailing arm rear suspension with coil springs. Cruise control, audible warning messages, 7-way adjustable driver's seat, digital Automatic climate control, and digital speed and tachometer display using LEDs were included on top and mid-model trim packages. At the same time, ventilated disc brakes for all wheels and self-diagnosis maintenance reminders, among other electronic features, were standard equipment.

The AM/FM stereo cassette had the ability to record on higher-quality metal tapes. On the face of the stereo was a microphone jack that would accommodate a microphone. If it was installed with a digital instrument cluster a trip computer was included. The digital cluster featured a digital tachometer, digital speedometer, electronic fuel, and coolant level gauges. The trip computer could calculate and display various things such as fuel economy in kilometers-per-liter, estimated time of arrival (ETA), and distance remaining to the destination. It was offered in four exterior colors with contrasting dark gray or dark brown interiors, while the six trim packages offered optional equipment as standard on the three top-level packages. The trim package names were the 2800GT-Extra, 2800GT, 2000VX, 2000VR, 2000V II with the entry-level 2000V I.

When the mid-model refresh was introduced, several technological improvements were added. The digital speedometer was augmented with Electro MultiVision display, on the 3.0 GT-Limited with the automatic transmission installed. It consisted of a six-inch CRT TV display installed in the instrument cluster showing engine revolutions, shift position, fuel consumption trends, and TEMS suspension settings. It would also notify if any maintenance warnings on linked systems should be done. Different functions would be displayed by touching a button; however, the screen was not touch-sensitive. If the car was stationary with the transmission in park and the parking brake applied, broadcast TV could be watched.

The Soarer was the first Toyota automobile with Toyota Electronic Modulated Suspension (TEMS) and an all-new double wishbone suspension was installed for the front and rear wheels, labeled as PEGASUS (Precision Engineered Geometrically Advanced SUSpension) to accommodate the adjustable shock absorbers and anti-lock brakes were included. All mid-model refresh cars can be distinguished by where the side view mirrors are installed, whereby after 1983, the mirrors were relocated to the doors. The trim package names were updated to the 2.8 GT-Limited, 2.8 GT, 2.0 GT, 2.0 Turbo, 2.0VX, and 2.0VR with the entry-level 2.0V II, and for 1984 the 2.8 engine was upgraded to the 3.0-liter engine.

The Z10 series Toyota Soarer was produced from February 1981 to December 1985 in 2.0L, 2.8L, or 3.0L DOHC straight-six engines, and all engines came standard with electronic fuel injection. Early M-TEU-powered MZ11 models were different from later MZ11s in some regards. Later improvements to the MZ11 engine included a water-to-air intercooler, and further enhancements were made to an oil-and-water-cooled turbo, as opposed to the oil-cooled-only turbo in the early MZ11s.

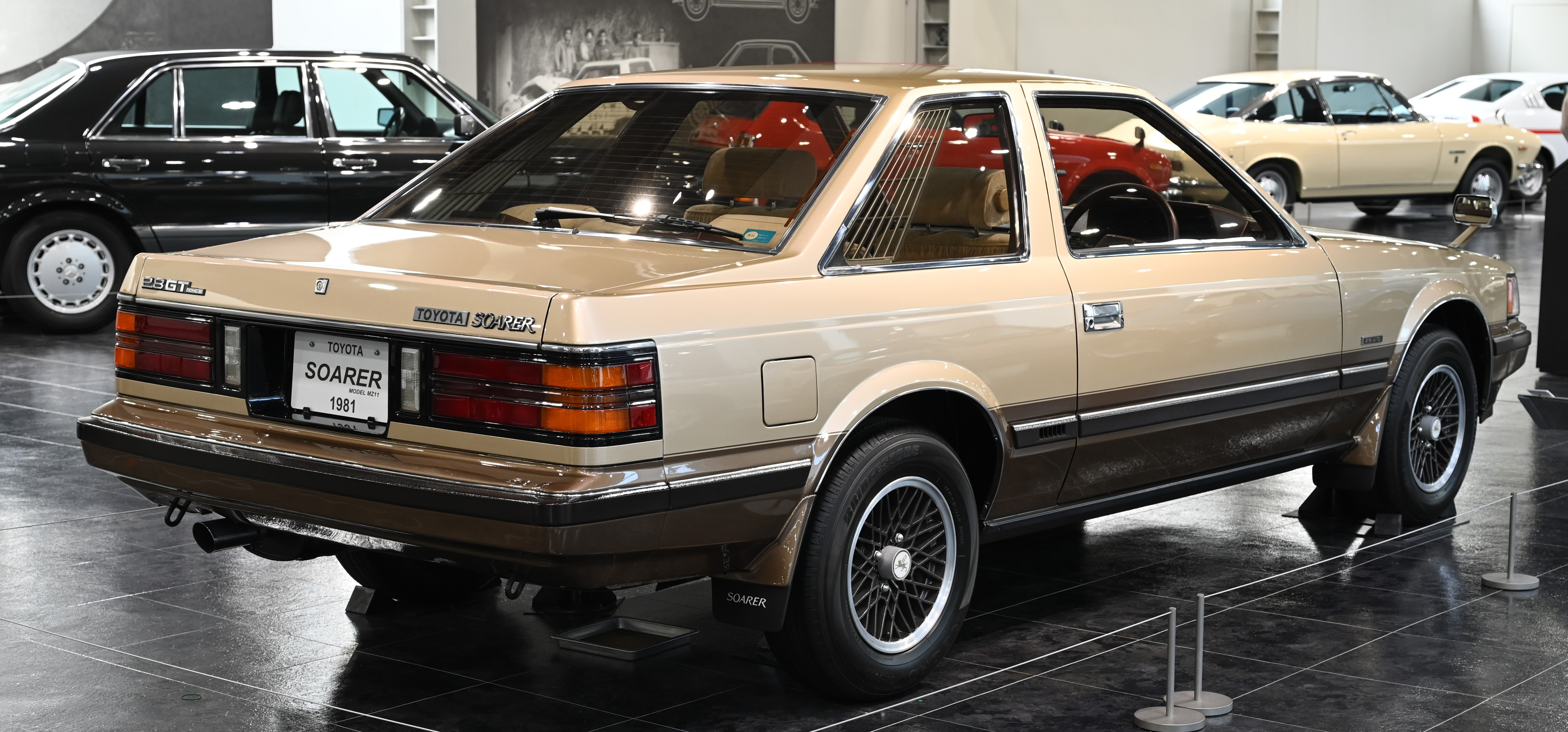
1981 Soarer 2800GT Extra (MZ11)

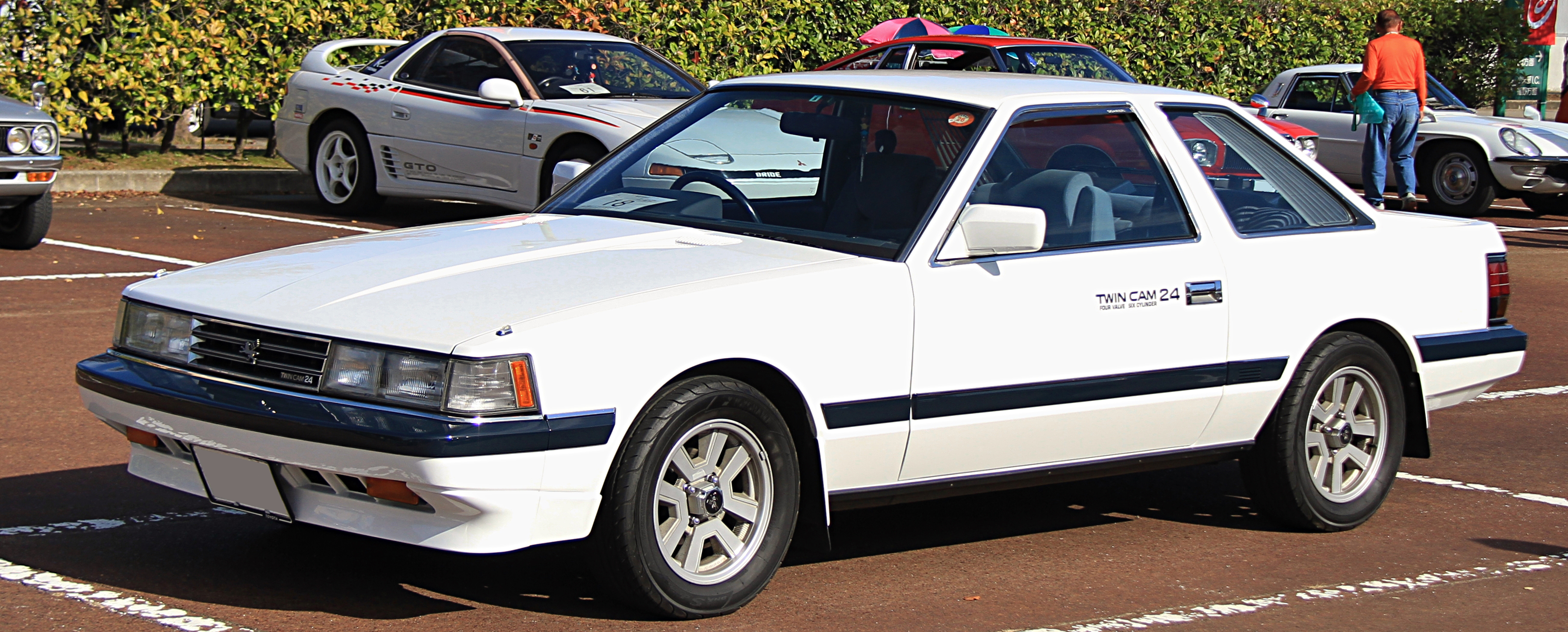
1984 Toyota Soarer 2.0 GT (facelift)

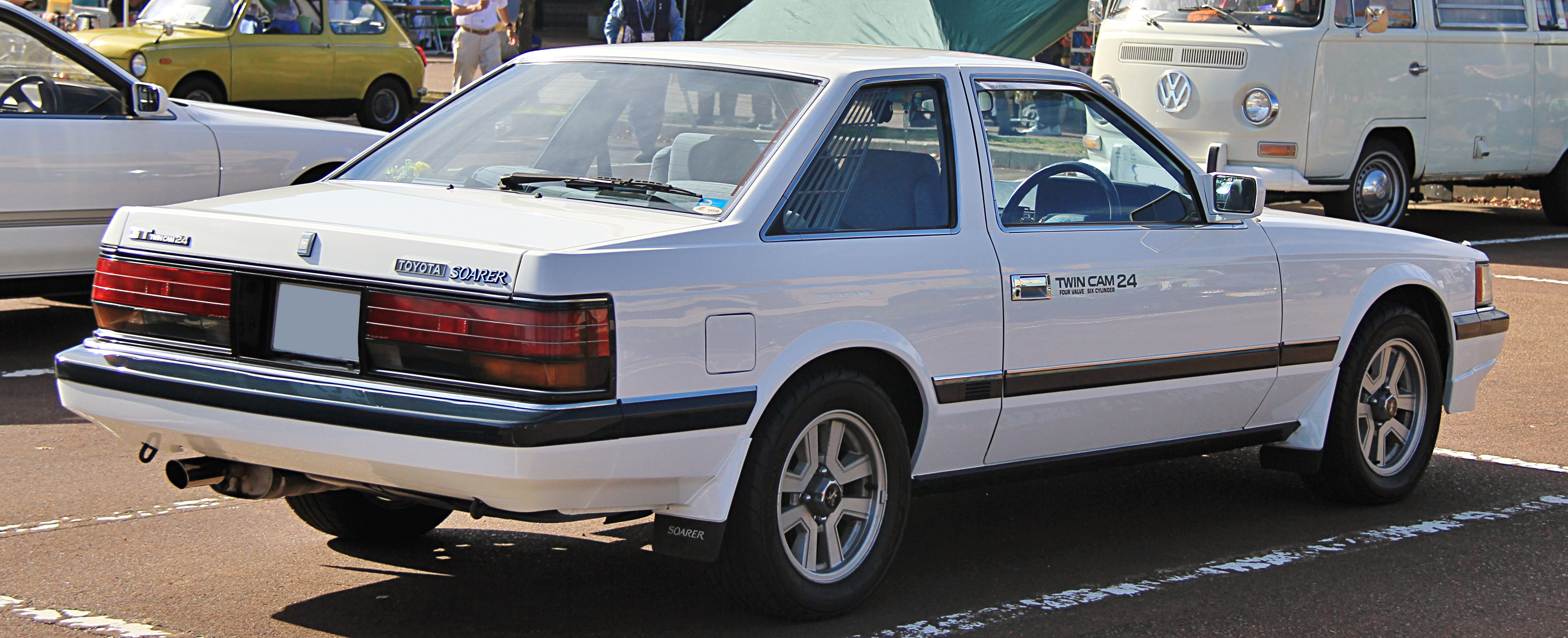
1984 Toyota Soarer 2.0GT (GZ10, facelift)

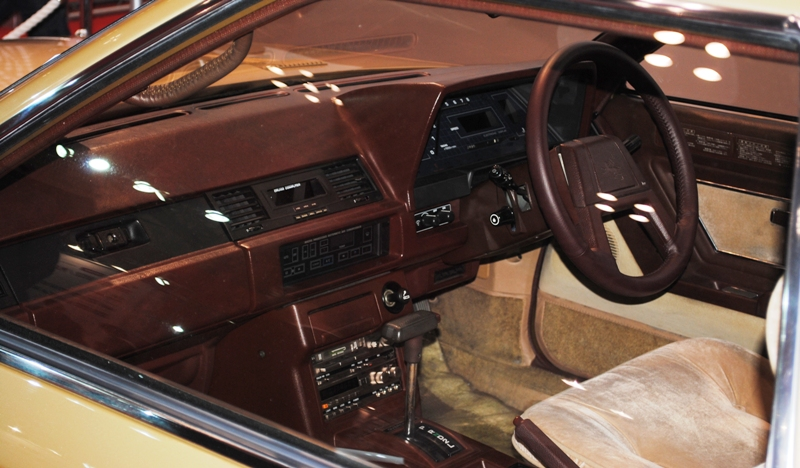
Z10 Toyota Soarer interior

== Second generation (1986–1991) ==
Toyota Soarer
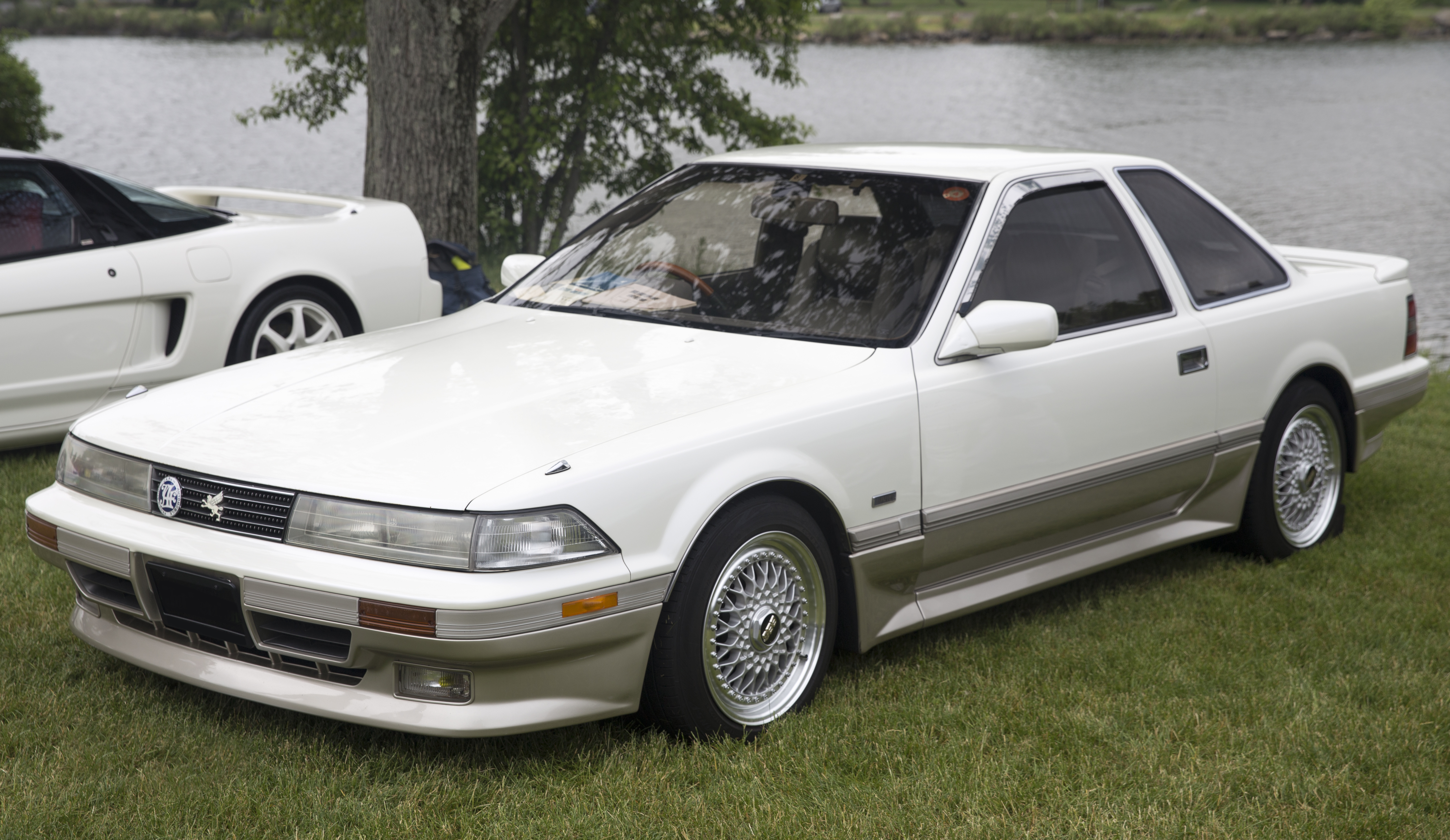
- Toyota Soarer 3.0 GT Limited

Overview
- Model code: Z20
- Production: January 1986 – April 1991

Body and chassis
- Body style: 2-door coupé (GZ20, MZ20); 2-door convertible (MZ20 Aerocabin)
- Related: Toyota Supra (A70)

Powertrain
- Engine: 2.0 L 1G-E I6; 2.0 L 1G-GE I6; 2.0 L 1G-FE I6; 2.0 L 1G-GTE twin-turbo I6; 3.0 L 7M-GTE turbo I6
- Transmission: 5-speed R154 manual (7M-GTE); 5-speed W57/W58 manual (1G-GE/GTE); 4-speed A340E automatic

Dimensions
- Wheelbase: 2,670 mm (105.1 in)
- Length: 4,675 mm (184.1 in)
- Width: 1,725 mm (67.9 in) (3.0L engine); 1,690 mm (66.5 in)
- Height: 1,335 mm (52.6 in)
- Curb weight: 1,300–1,520 kg (2,866–3,351 lb)

The Z20 series Toyota Soarer was produced from January 1986 to April 1991 and was available in several variants. The styling of the second-generation Soarer is similar of that of the X80 series Cressida, Mark II, Chaser and Cresta. The Soarer shared its platform with the newly introduced A70 series Supra.

The Z20 Soarer revised the previous generation Electro MultiVision CRT display installation from the instrument cluster to a location below the automatic climate control, which could be upgraded to a touch-sensitive interface. A new feature offered navigation information uploaded by the use of cassette tapes then upgraded to CD-ROM. The digital speedometer display was upgraded and provided more information at a glance. The cloth upholstery was unique to each trim package, and the sport bucket seats used in the Toyota Supra (A70) were offered only on GT trim packages upholstered in cloth or leather.

In 1986, the electronically controlled shock absorber (TEMS) carried over from the previous generation, and the double wishbone suspension was now shared with the A70 Supra. An electronically controlled airbag suspension was also available on the GT Limited model.

In 1988, TOM'S released a limited-model package for the 7M-GTE equipped vehicles named the C5. The TOM'S C5 Soarer could be optioned with a remapped ECU, larger turbocharger compressor, a woven fibre intake pipe, KYB shock absorbers with lowered springs, bespoke 16x8" ±50 TOM'S C5 wheels that were manufactured by Ray's Engineering and TOM'S C5 badges for the rear of the vehicle.

In April 1989, a limited 500-unit variant called the Aerocabin was introduced. This variant had only 2 seats and an electric folding roof. The Aerocabin had the same specs as the GT-Limited but was only available with the 7M-GTE engine, 4-speed automatic transmission, tan leather interior, and pearlescent paint.

In 1988, the Soarer Z20 was given a facelift. The grille and rear taillights were redesigned and minor interior changes were made (climate control, dash). Other than that engines were improved, with power increases as follows:

- 1G-GTEU 180 to 200 PS (132 to 147 kW; 178 to 197 hp)
- 7M-GTEU 230 to 240 PS (169 to 177 kW; 227 to 237 hp)

Unlike the A70 Supra, the 2.5 L twin turbo 1JZ-GTE was not made available for the Z20 Soarer. However, all models built from May 1989 including the Aerocabin did have a revised crossmember.

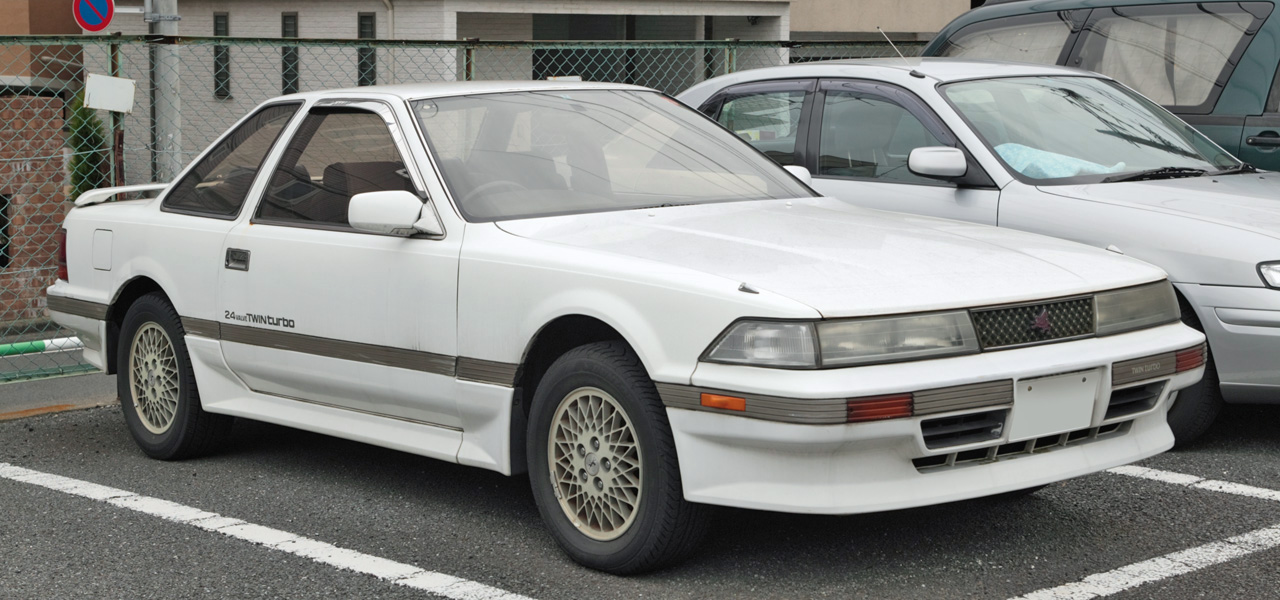
Toyota Soarer 2.0 GT Twin-turbo (GZ20)

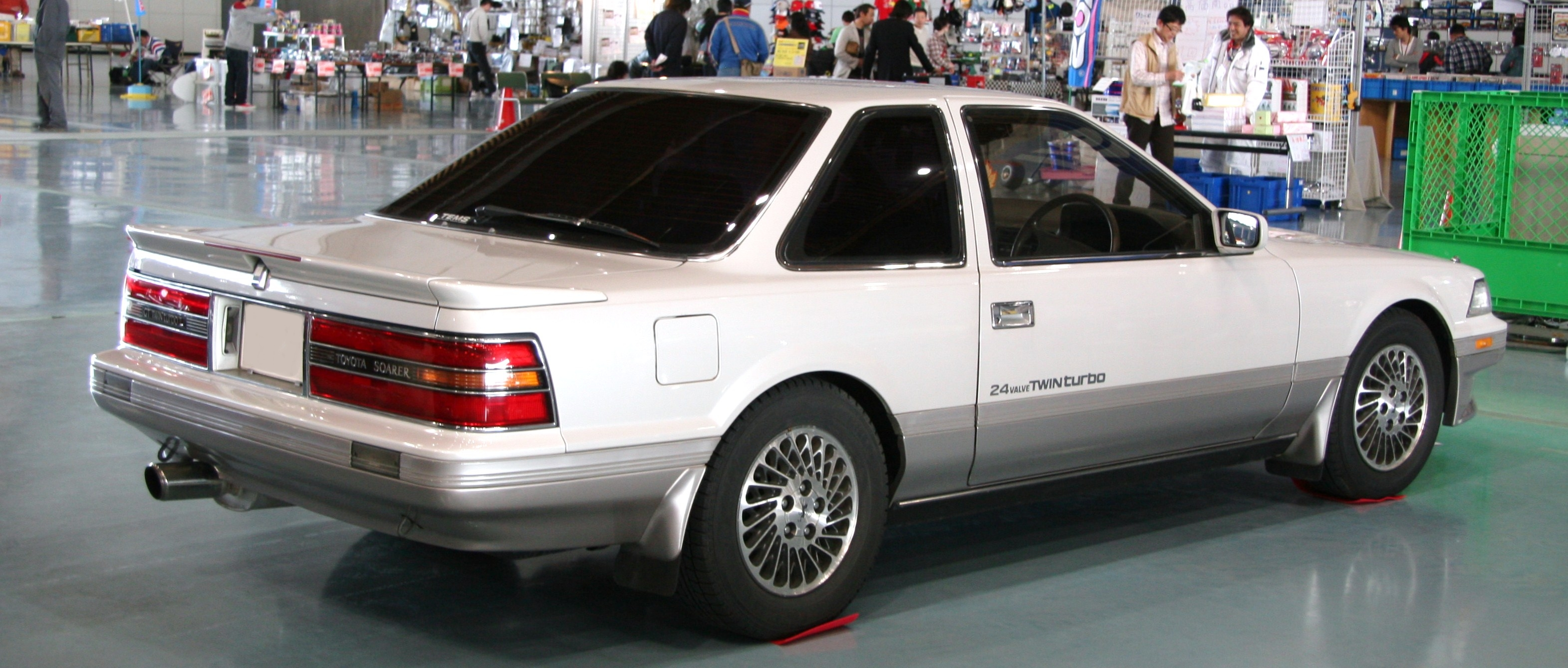
1988–1991 Toyota Soarer 2.0 GT Twin-turbo L (GZ20); rear view

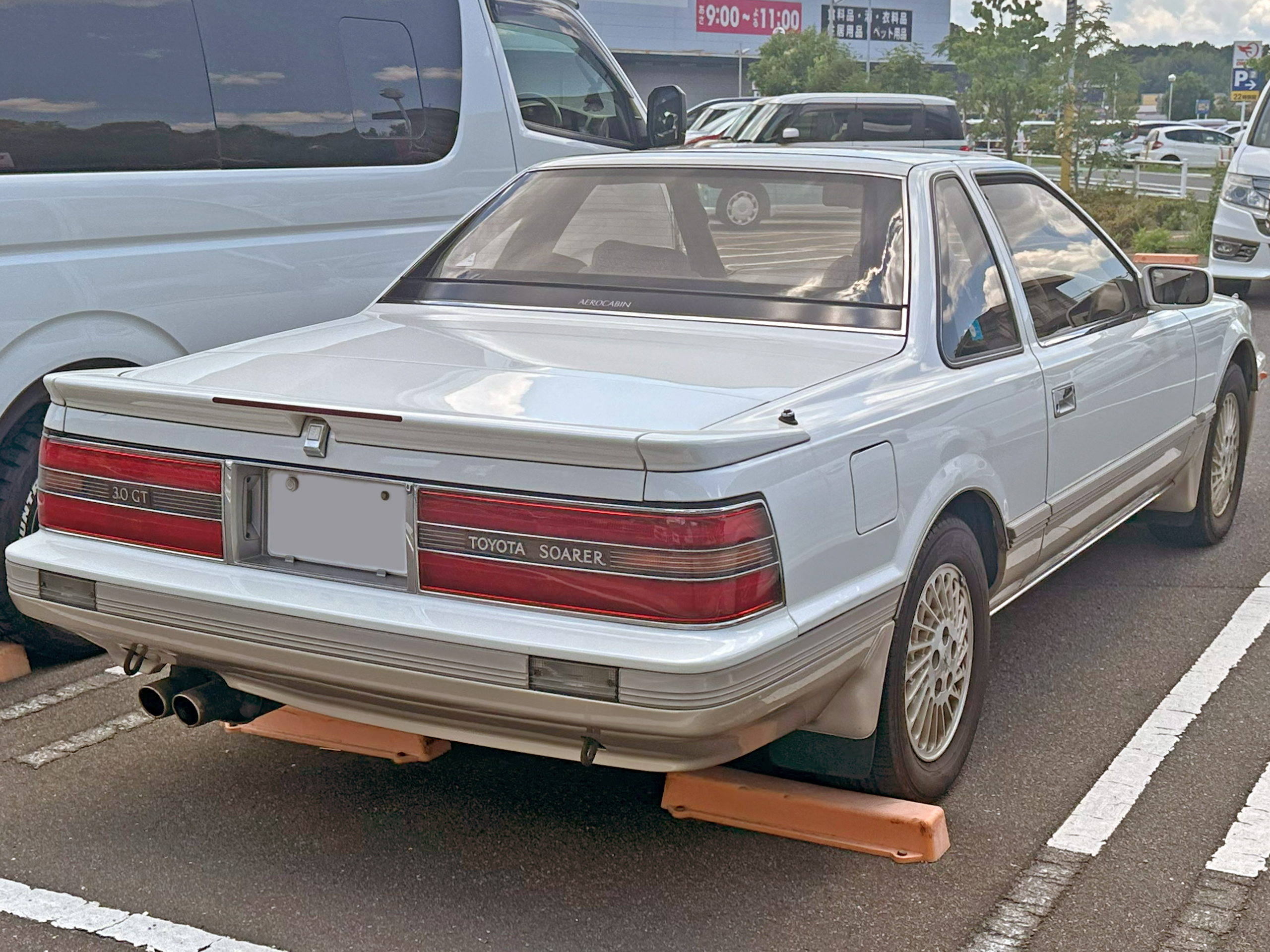
Soarer AeroCabin rear view

model code	chassis code	grade	year	engine	transmission	weight (kg)	turbo	notes	
GZ20	HCMEE	2.0 VZ	1986.1–1987.12	1G-EU	W57 5-speed M/T	1300	N/A	87.1- +10 kg	
GZ20	HCPEE	2.0 VZ	1986.1–1987.12	1G-EU	A42DL 4-speed A/T	1310	N/A	87.1- +10 kg	
GZ20	HCMGE	2.0 VX	1986.1–1988.12	1G-EU	W57 5-speed M/T	1320	N/A	87.1- +10 kg	88.1- +20 kg
GZ20	HCPGE	2.0 VX	1986.1–1988.12	1G-EU	A42DE 4-speed A/T	1330	N/A	87.1- +10 kg	88.1- +20 kg
GZ20	HCMGK	2.0 VX	1989.1–1991.4	1G-FE	W57 5-speed M/T	1350	N/A	ESC	
GZ20	HCPGK	2.0 VX	1989.1–1991.4	1G-FE	A42DE 4-speed A/T	1360	N/A	ESC	
GZ20	HCMVF	2.0 GT	1986.1–1991.4	1G-GEU	W55 5-speed M/T	1330	N/A	87.1- +10 kg, 88.1- +30 kg and ESC	
GZ20	HCPVF	2.0 GT	1986.1–1991.4	1G-GEU	A42DE 4-speed A/T	1340	N/A	87.1- +10 kg, 88.1- +30 kg and ESC	89.1- A340E 4-speed A/T
GZ20	HCMVZ	2.0 GT-TWIN TURBO	1986.1–1991.4	1G-GTE	W57 5-speed M/T	1400	Twin CT-12	87.1- +10 kg and ESC, 88.1- +20 kg	88.1- W58 5-speed M/T
GZ20	HCPVZ	2.0 GT-TWIN TURBO	1986.1–1991.4	1G-GTE	A340E 4-speed A/T	1420	Twin CT-12	87.1- +10 kg and ESC, 88.1- +20 kg	
GZ20	HCMZZ	2.0 GT-TWIN TURBO L	1988.1–1991.4	1G-GTE	W58 5-speed M/T	1430	Twin CT-12	ESC	
GZ20	HCPZZ	2.0 GT-TWIN TURBO L	1988.1–1991.4	1G-GTE	A340E 4-speed A/T	1450	Twin CT-12	ESC	
MZ20	HCMZZ	3.0 GT	1987.1–1991.4	7M-GTE	R154 5-speed M/T	1490	CT-26	87.1- +20 kg, 88.1-+ 20 kg, 89.1- +10 kg	
MZ20	HCPVZ	3.0 GT	1986.1–1991.4	7M-GTE	A340E 4-speed A/T	1470	CT-26	87.1- +20 kg, 88.1-+ 20 kg, 89.1- +10 kg	
MZ20	HJPVZ	3.0 GT AEROCABIN	1989.4	7M-GTE	A340E 4-speed A/T	1610	CT-26	Limited run of 500 units	
MZ20	HCMZZ	3.0 GT LIMITED	1987.1–1991.4	7M-GTE	R154 5-speed M/T	1520	CT-26	87.1- +20 kg	88.1- +10 kg
MZ20	HCPZZ	3.0 GT LIMITED	1986.1–1991.4	7M-GTE	A340E 4-speed A/T	1500	CT-26	87.1- +20 kg	88.1- +10 kg
MZ21	HCMZZ	3.0 GT LIMITED	1987.1–1991.4	7M-GTE	R154 5-speed M/T	1520	CT-26	Air suspension	88.1- +10 kg
MZ21	HCPZZ	3.0 GT LIMITED	1986.1–1991.4	7M-GTE	A340E 4-speed A/T	1520	CT-26	Air suspension	88.1- +10 kg
ESC (optional) = +10 kg, Sunroof (optional on all models except the aerocabin)= +20 kg

== Third generation (1991–2001) ==
Toyota Soarer
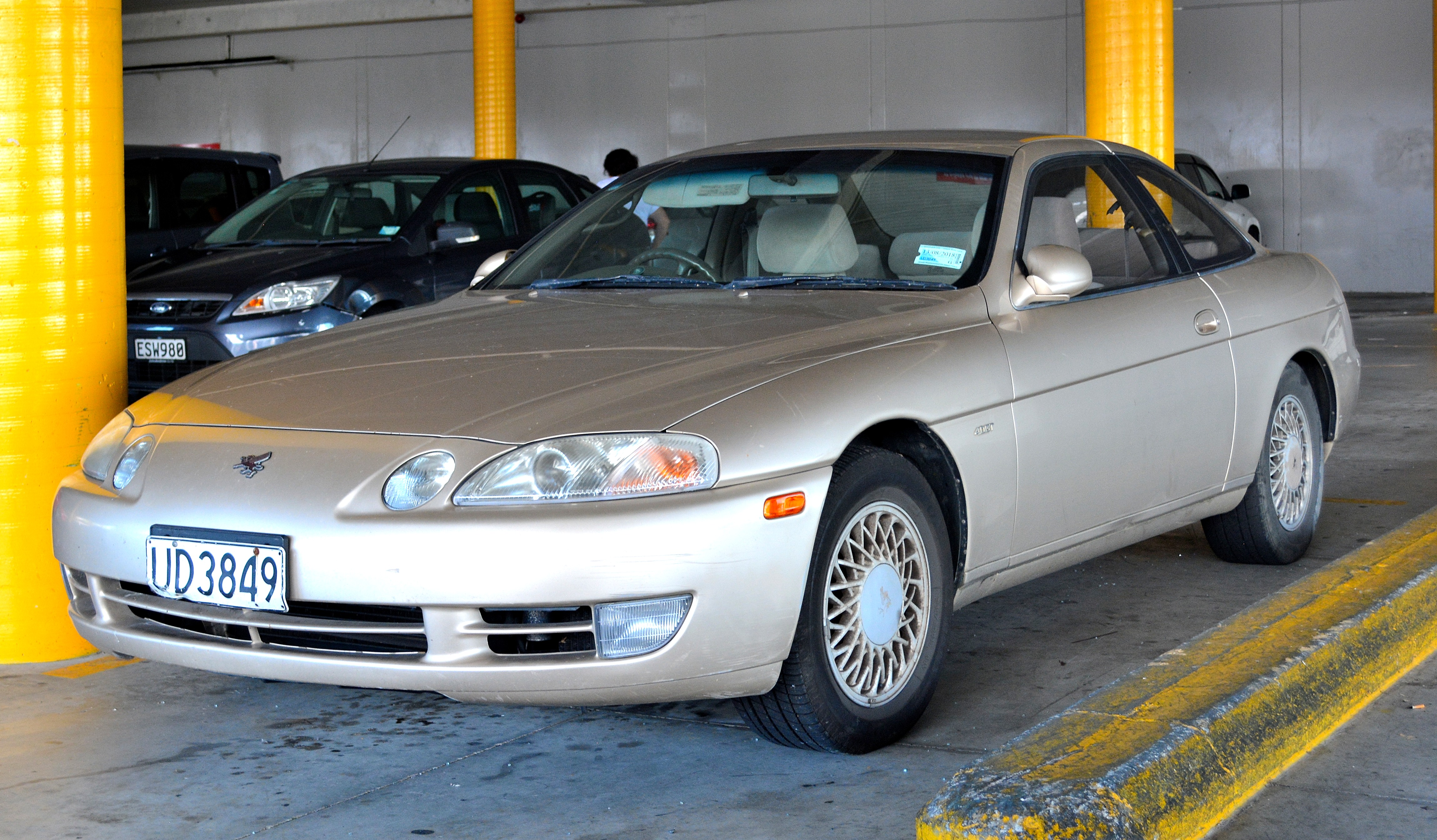
- 1991 Toyota Soarer 4.0 GT (UZZ31)

Overview
- Model code: Z30
- Also called: Lexus SC (Z30)
- Production: May 1991 - March 2001
- Designer: Erwin Lui and Dennis Campbell (1988–1989)

Body and chassis
- Body style: 2-door coupé
- Related: Toyota Supra (A80)

Powertrain
- Engine: 2.5 L 1JZ-GTE turbo/twin-turbo I6 (JZZ30); 3.0 L 2JZ-GE I6 (JZZ31); 4.0 L 1UZ-FE V8 (UZZ30/31/32)
- Transmission: 5-speed manual (JZZ30 only); 4-speed automatic

Dimensions
- Wheelbase: 2,690 mm (105.9 in)
- Length: 4,860–4,890 mm (191.3–192.5 in)
- Width: 1,790–1,800 mm (70.5–70.9 in)
- Height: 1,330–1,350 mm (52.4–53.1 in)
- Curb weight: 1,540–1,730 kg (3,395–3,814 lb)

In 1987, following the design freeze of Lexus division's flagship UCF10 LS 400 (Celsior) sedan due in 1989, Toyota commissioned its California design studio Calty to develop a new luxury coupe. In mid 1991, the vehicle designed by the studio debuted in the U.S. as the Lexus SC 300/400.

That same year, Toyota debuted the third-generation Z30 series Soarer in Japan, replacing the Z20 series. The Z30 series Soarer shared the body and key components with the Lexus SC, with different interior features, powertrain configurations, and enhanced performance. The trim packages were the 4.0 GT-Limited, 4.0 GT, 2.5 GT-TwinTurbo-L and the 2.5 GT-TwinTurbo.

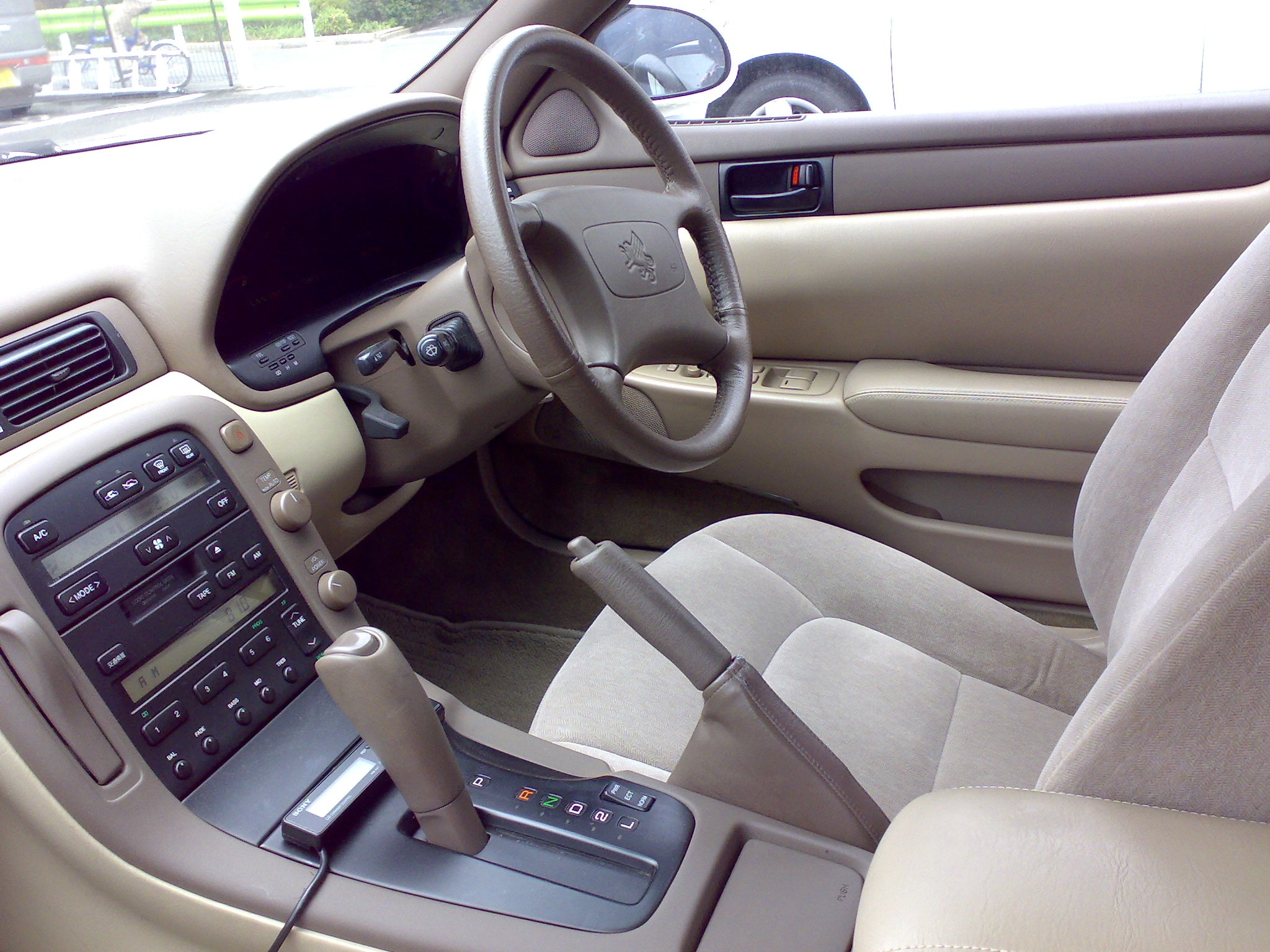
2.5 GT-Twin Turbo interior

The new Soarer continued some of the features of earlier models, such as digital dashboard instrumentation and integrated car systems control via the in-dash EMV touchscreen. It was also one of the first cars in the world to feature a factory GPS automotive navigation system via CD-ROM overlaid with VICS traffic information for Japanese driving conditions. This generation of the Soarer was considered an expensive and extravagant luxury car in Japan. It was longer and wider than a Crown, while comfortably accommodating two passengers, with only modest space available for rear seat passengers. It did not comply with Japanese Government dimension regulations which made buyers liable for yearly taxes due to its size. The larger engines also obliged Japanese buyers to pay more annual road tax.

One of the distinctive features was the articulating door hinges. When the doors opened, the hinges moved out and forward, allowing entry and exit in confined spaces.

From launch in 1991 until 2000 all models were available with a 4-speed automatic transmission. In addition, the sportier JZZ30 Soarer could be had with a 5-speed manual transmission. All models were available with a Torsen torque-sensing differential. Unlike their US Lexus equivalents, the Z30-series Soarer lineup never received a 5-speed automatic, and only the six-cylinder versions received variable valve timing (VVTi) engines, in 1996.

Styling-wise, the Soarer received only minor changes during its 9-year production run, mostly external. External changes were shared with the U.S Lexus models. Changes were:

- Series 1, May 1991 - December 1993: original body and style.

From May 1992 Series 1 received an update with heated seats and exterior temperature display.

- Series 2, January 1994 - August 1996: new front bumper with one-piece lower grille, fog lights replace cornering lights, new tail lights.
- Series 3, August 1996 - December 2000: new front bumper with upper grille, oval fog lights, new tail lights, longer rear bumper, standard side skirts, elevated rear spoiler, body stripe.

Starting in 1997, the Soarer was used as a high speed patrol car in multiple Japanese prefectures, using the 2.5GT trim with a 5-speed manual transmission.

=== Z30 series Soarer models ===
Model	Year	Engine	Power (kW)	Torque (Nm)	Turbo	Transmissions	Notes
JZZ30	1991–1996	1JZ-GTE (2.5 L I6)	280 PS (206 kW; 276 hp)	363 N⋅m (268 lb⋅ft)	twin parallel	manual (R154), auto	
	1997–2000	1JZ-GTE (2.5 L I6), VVT-i	280 PS (206 kW; 276 hp)	378 N⋅m (279 lb⋅ft)	single	manual (R154), auto	
JZZ31	1994–1996	2JZ-GE (3.0 L I6)	225 PS (165 kW; 222 hp)	285 N⋅m (210 lb⋅ft)	none	auto	equivalent to Lexus SC300
	1997–2000	2JZ-GE (3.0 L I6), VVT-i	230 PS (169 kW; 227 hp)	304 N⋅m (224 lb⋅ft)	none	auto	equivalent to Lexus SC300
UZZ30	1991–1993	1UZ-FE (4.0 V8)	260 PS (191 kW; 256 hp)	353 N⋅m (260 lb⋅ft)	none	auto	equivalent to Lexus SC400
UZZ31	1991–1997	1UZ-FE (4.0 V8)	until 1994: 260 PS (191 kW; 256 hp) after 1994: 265 PS (195 kW; 261 hp)	until 1994: 353 N⋅m (260 lb⋅ft) after 1994: 363 N⋅m (268 lb⋅ft)	none	auto	airbag suspension, "EMV" TV/touchscreen system
UZZ32	1991–1996	1UZ-FE (4.0 V8)	until 1994: 260 PS (191 kW; 256 hp) after 1994: 265 PS (195 kW; 261 hp)	until 1994: 353 N⋅m (260 lb⋅ft) after 1994: 363 N⋅m (268 lb⋅ft)	none	auto	active hydraulic suspension, four-wheel steering, "EMV" TV/touchscreen system

=== JZZ30 Soarer ===
The JZZ30 was the only model sold continuously from the introduction of the 30 series in 1991 until production ceased in 2001. As the sportiest model in the range it was also the only one available with a R154 manual transmission. Like other models in the range there were two different equipment grades available, the base GT-T and the better-equipped GT-TL which added electric seats, wood trim, cruise control and Toyota's TEMS electronic damper adjustment to the list of standard features.

The JZZ30 was powered by the 2.5-litre 1JZ-GTE turbocharged engine. Initially featuring two identical small turbos running together (unlike the sequential twin turbo systems of the Supra and Mazda RX-7, for example), it was officially rated at 208 kW (283 PS; 279 hp) and 363 N⋅m (268 lb⋅ft) of torque at 4,800 rpm. This was in keeping with the Japanese Manufacturers' advertised power limit agreement, however real-world power outputs were somewhat higher. In August 1996, the engine received Toyota's variable valve timing system (VVTi) and in conjunction with a single, more efficient turbocharger, produced much better high and mid-range torque and better fuel economy. Official power output remained limited to 280 PS, although torque was now 378 N⋅m (279 lb⋅ft) at 2,400 rpm.

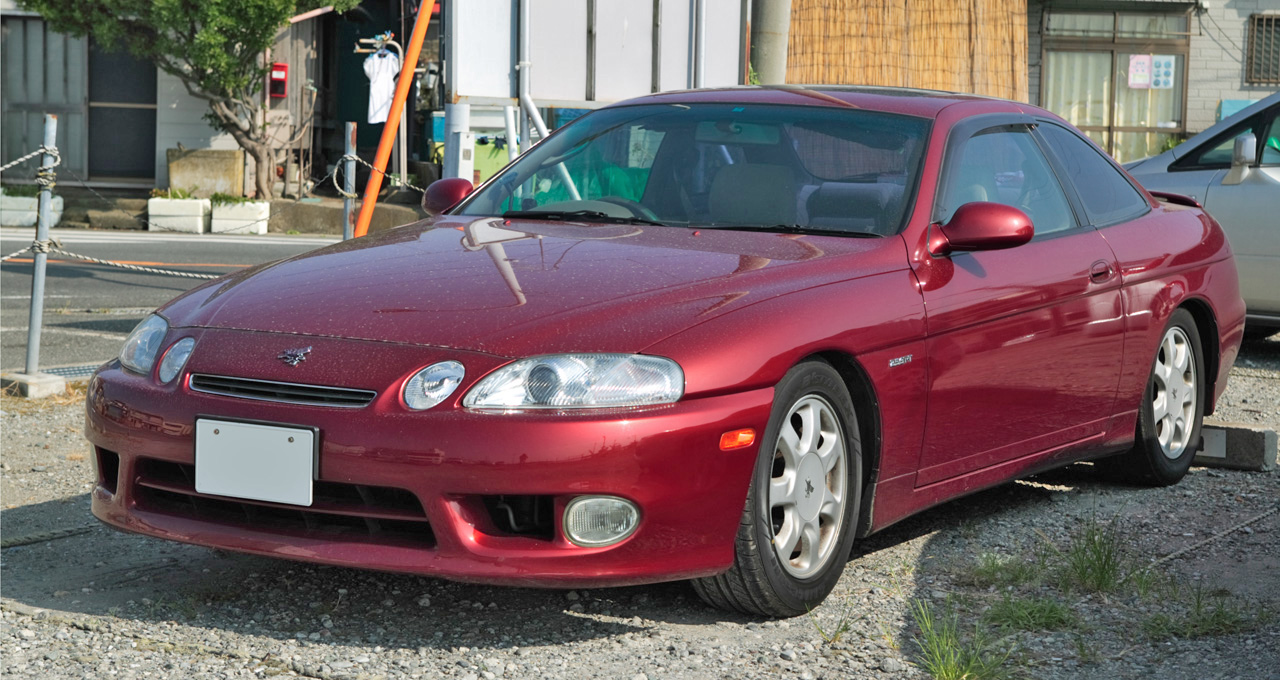
JZZ30 Toyota Soarer (1996-2001)

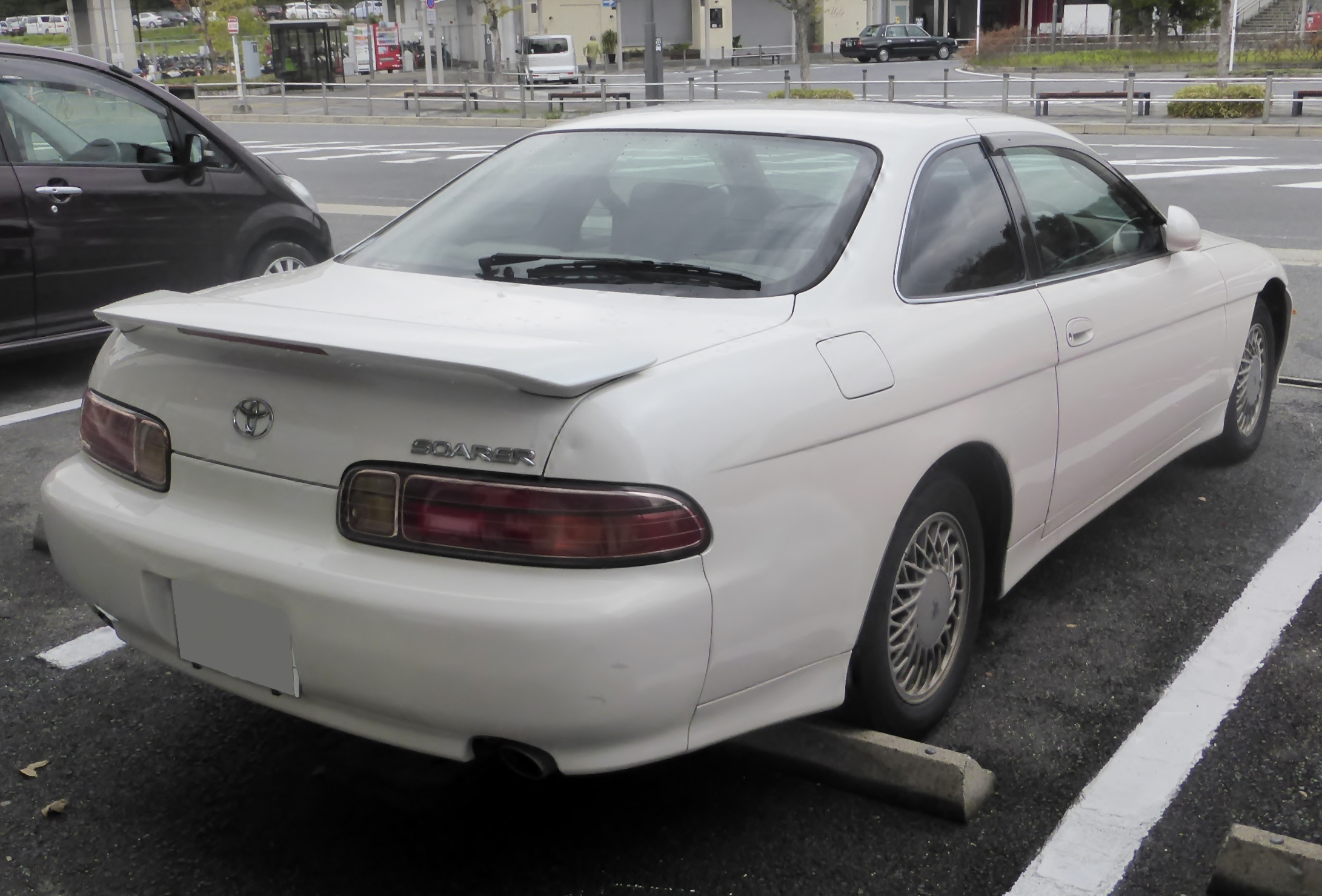
JZZ30 Toyota Soarer, third generation (1996-2001)

=== JZZ31 Soarer ===
While the Lexus SC300 was available from the start of the new series' US introduction in 1991, the equivalent Japan-market Soarer model — the JZZ31 — was not introduced until 1994, where it was marketed as the "new base model" Soarer. 1994 also saw the introduction of the new black interior colour scheme which replaced the grey colour scheme used in blue, red, and black external colour cars until the end of 1993. The JZZ31 was the only one of the two JZZ models to feature manually adjustable black leather seats. The black interior scheme became the prominent interior scheme for all Japanese Soarers by the end of production.

The JZZ31 was powered by the 3-litre 2JZ-GE engine, which initially was rated at 225 PS (165 kW; 222 hp) at 5,800 rpm and 285 N⋅m (210 lb⋅ft) of torque at 4,800 rpm. Like the JZZ30 the engine also received Toyota's VVTi system in 1997 which increased output to 230 PS (169 kW; 227 hp) at 6,000 rpm and 304 N⋅m (224 lb⋅ft) at 4,000 rpm while simultaneously improving fuel economy.

While the increasing cost and slowing sales of the V8 models in the mid-to-late 1990s led to their discontinuation, the six-cylinder JZZ31 and JZZ30 were to remain in production until the Z30 series was replaced by the Z40 series in April 2001.

=== UZZ30 Soarer ===
The UZZ30 was introduced in Japan as the 'base' model of the V8 powered 30 series lineup. Fitted with the same 4.0-litre quad-cam V8 as the UZZ31/32, it benefited in the performance stakes due to its considerably lighter weight. The UZZ30 used a standard Tokico coilover suspension setup, basic stereo system, manual steering column, and very few electronic aids. While the UZZ31 and UZZ32 models had electrically adjusted heated leather seats with memory, those in the UZZ30 were upholstered in velour and had no heating or memory. The UZZ30 also came without sunroof or rear wiper. As the car was substantially lighter due to the exclusion of all the luxury amenities, it was a considered a driver's car, with good power, handling and braking.

The UZZ30 series Soarer was used as the base vehicle for the Lexus SC400 (model code UZZ30) exported to the United States, although to satisfy U.S. requirements, a comprehensive range of luxury options was offered, including some features of the UZZ31, such as seat memory position, traction control, sunroof, sun visors with courtesy light and electronic steering position adjustment. Local Japanese Soarers had an electronic dashboard which used an integral mirror to display the instruments holographically. This design was never offered on a USA spec model. Those cars came with a standard dash layout of round dials and lit needles similar to the LS400 Lexus sedan. Whereas the left hand drive version of UZZ30 was made throughout the entire 9-year production run, the right hand drive version was made from 1991 until 1993.

=== UZZ31 Soarer "Limited" ===
The UZZ31 and UZZ32 Soarers were the luxury GT versions of the range, with more features and equipment than the UZZ30 and the 6-cylinder models, and even the U.S market Lexus SC300/400. The EMV (Electro Multi Vision) touchscreen system which was pioneered in the Z10 and Z20 Soarers was again available and provided a screen with television, GPS navigation, diagnostics, car computer, reversing camera and touch control of all functions of the climate control and audio system. The latter was highly sophisticated, with balanced-signal digital signal processing, 12-disc CD stacker and 7 speakers with subwoofer.

All three V8 models were powered by Toyota's acclaimed 1UZ-FE quad-cam all-alloy 4-litre V8. While rated at marginally less power and torque than the turbocharged JZZ30 counterpart (191 kW (260 PS; 256 hp) at 5,400 rpm, 353 N⋅m (260 lb⋅ft) at 4,600 rpm) the V8, called the 4.0GT-L was renowned for its smoothness and refinement. Although receiving a minor update in 1995 which improved responsiveness and bumped outputs to 195 kW (265 PS; 261 hp) 363 N⋅m (268 lb⋅ft), production of the V8-equipped Soarers ended before the powerplant received VVTi which substantially increased outputs in the Lexus SC400 and other models.

The UZZ31 featured a driver-adjustable air suspension system that had two settings for both ride height and damper stiffness. The high-pressure air was provided by an electric pump mounted at the front of the car. Also featured on the UZZ31 series were a host of electronic features including automatic headlights (shared also with the UZZ30), speed-sensitive wipers, electric-controlled 2-position memory seats with heated feature as an additional factory option, electronically adjustable steering column with memory, optional reversing camera, cabin air purifying system (also shared with the JZZ31 from 1994), touch screen TV with 12-stack CD player, touch screen SatNav, and a full onboard computer diagnostic system which would output to the TV display unit. Like the JZZ30, the UZZ31 came with optional sunroof and rear wiper.

Additionally, the UZZ31 could be "special ordered" from Toyota Japan without the EMV, instead being fitted with the radio/CD unit of the UZZ30 with separate climate control. Additionally, electric velour seats from the UZZ30 and JZZ30 models could be special ordered in place of the standard UZZ31 / UZZ32 leather electric seats. These special-order cars would take only a week to produce from the time of the order to completed product. It is not known how many non-EMV UZZ31s were made, although they were offered from the very start of production in 1991. These non-EMV UZZ31 Soarers are uncommon, with only the UZZ32 more rare.

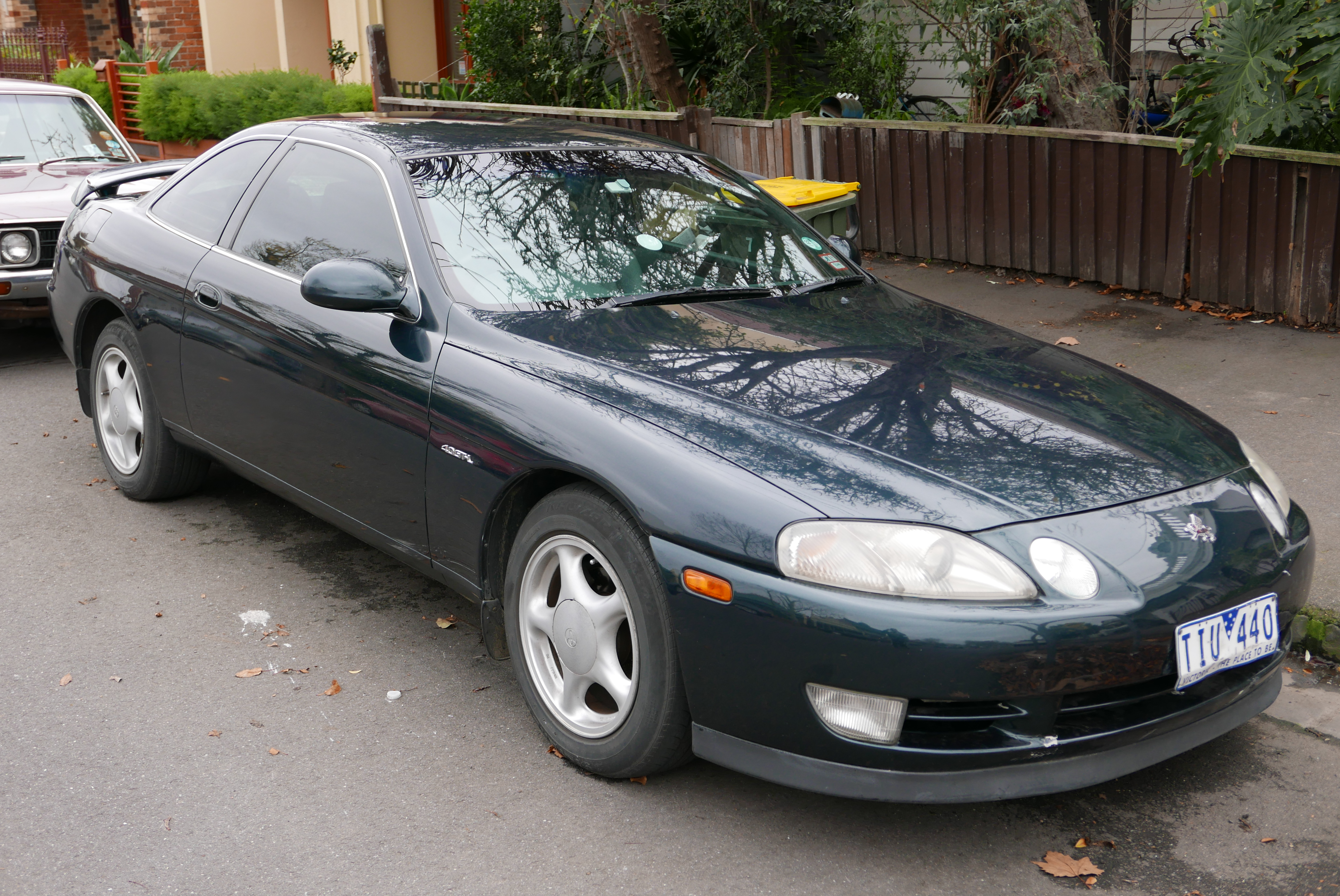
1992 UZZ31 Toyota Soarer (Australia)

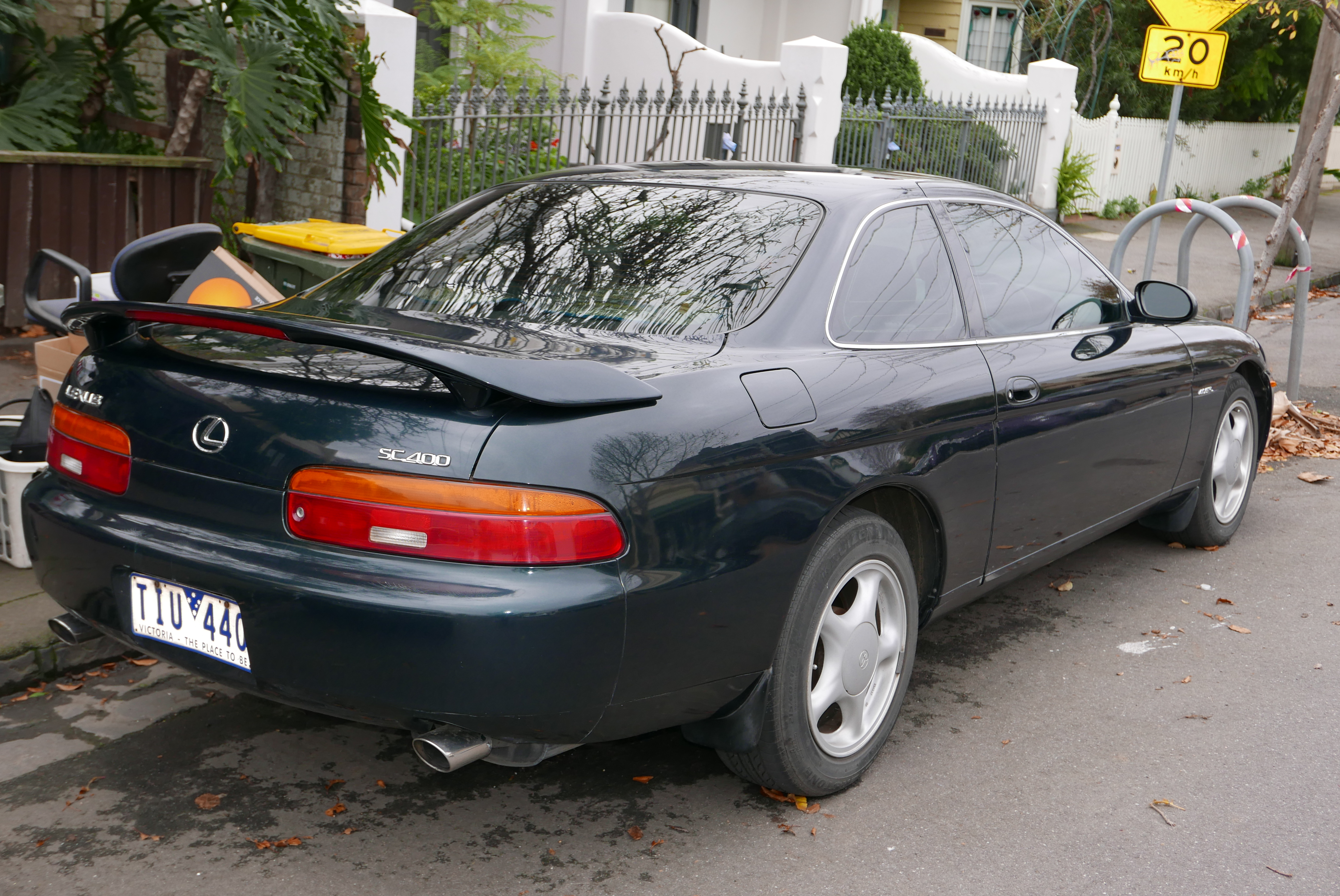
1992 UZZ31 Toyota Soarer (rear view)

=== UZZ32 Soarer "Limited" ===
The UZZ32 was the top-of-the-line 30 series, featuring all of the options available on the UZZ31 with the addition of the computer-controlled Toyota Active Control Suspension with four-wheel steering. The UZZ32 had no conventional suspension springs or anti-roll (stabiliser) bars, instead utilising self-levelling, fully hydropneumatic struts controlled by an array of sensors (such as axis accelerometers, suspension height, wheel speed and steering angle) that detected cornering, acceleration and braking forces.

The system worked well and gave an unusually controlled yet smooth ride with no body roll. However, the additional 110 kg (243 lb) weight of hydraulic componentry and power requirements of the system affected performance and reduced fuel economy compared to the standard UZZ30 and UZZ31 models.

The car was also costly to produce and at over ¥7,600,000 in 1995, expensive to buy. As a result, only 873 UZZ32s were made and are typically the most sought-after model in right-hand drive markets such as the Japan, UK, Australia and New Zealand.

=== Colours ===
Japanese Soarers were available in many colours. Some were offered continuously throughout the run and some as limited runs or one-offs. These colour runs did not always match the equivalent U.S. market offerings on the Lexus SC.

Colour	Code	Remark
Pearl white	051 (early); 057 (latter)	1991–2000
Black Onyx	202	1992–2000
Silver	176 (early); 1A0 (middle); 1C0 (latter)	1991–2000
Royal Jade Pearl (aka Bluish Green Metallic)	6M2	1991–1996
Classic Green Pearl	6P2	1996–2000
Beige Metallic	4K9	1991–1993
Red Mica	3K3	1991–1993
Renaissance Red (aka Super Red IV)	3L2	1994–2000
Dark Blue Mica	8J5	1991–1996
Blue Mica Metallic	8L5	1996–2000
Silver Spruce Metallic (aka Teal)	6M3	1991–1993
Teal Mist Metallic (aka Teal)	6N1	1994–1995

From 1991 until 1993, Soarers with external paint codes 8J5 and 202 came with a grey interior colour scheme. Those in 6M2 were available with both grey and "spruce" (blue-grey) interior schemes. Models in 3k3 could have grey or tan interiors. Models with paint codes 4k9, 051 (1991–1998) and 057 (1998–2001) came with tan interiors exclusively. Similarly, those with paint code 176 and 6M3 came with spruce interior colour exclusively.

From 1994, a black interior scheme replaced grey (becoming the predominant interior colour from 1998–2001) and from 1994–2001, cars with external paint code 202 came exclusively with the black interior. Models in 3L2 were available with either black or tan interiors.

In 1995, a limited edition was offered with Baltic Blue Metallic (752) paint that was shared with the 1993–1996 Toyota Supra and the 1994–1999 Toyota Celica. Roughly 199 SC300s were imported into the US with this exterior paint code and tan only interior, as well as 256 SC400s.

In 1996, exterior colour 6P2 replaced exterior colour 6M2 and 8L5 replaced 8J5. The spruce interior was discontinued in 1998. Thereafter, models in 1A0 and 1C0 which had come with spruce interiors were changed to black interiors and 6P2 cars became available with black or tan interior schemes.

== Fourth generation (2001–2005) ==
Toyota Soarer
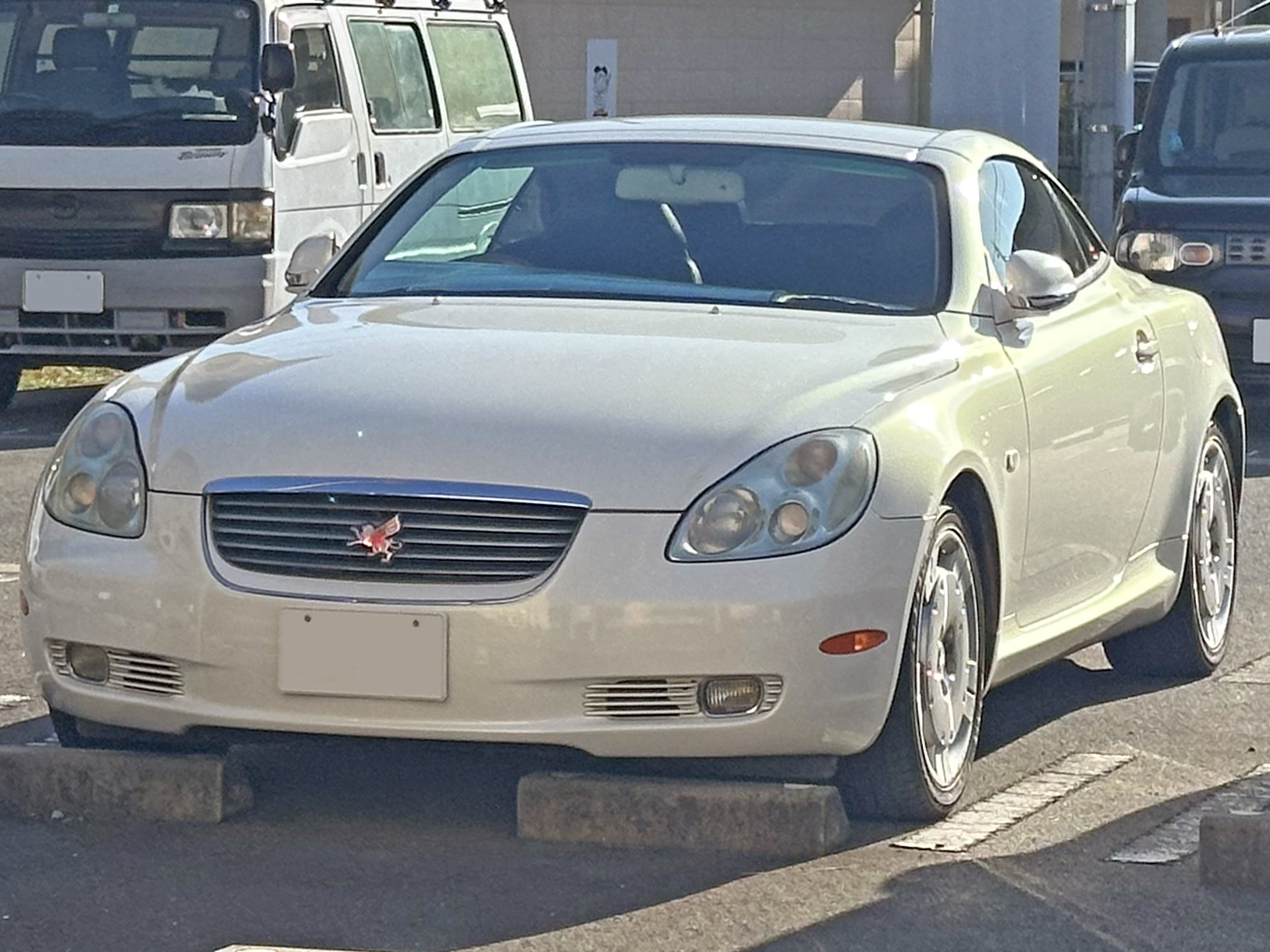
- Toyota Soarer 430SCV

Overview
- Model code: Z40
- Also called: Lexus SC (Z40)
- Production: April 2001–July 2005 (renamed in 2006 as Lexus SC)
- Designer: Sotiris Kovos (1997–1998)

Body and chassis
- Body style: 2-door retractable hardtop convertible

Powertrain
- Engine: 4.3 L 3UZ-FE V8
- Transmission: 5-speed automatic; 6-speed automatic (renamed model)

Dimensions
- Wheelbase: 2,620 mm (103.1 in)
- Length: 4,515 mm (177.8 in)
- Width: 1,825 mm (71.9 in)
- Height: 1,355 mm (53.3 in)
- Curb weight: 1,730 kg (3,814 lb)

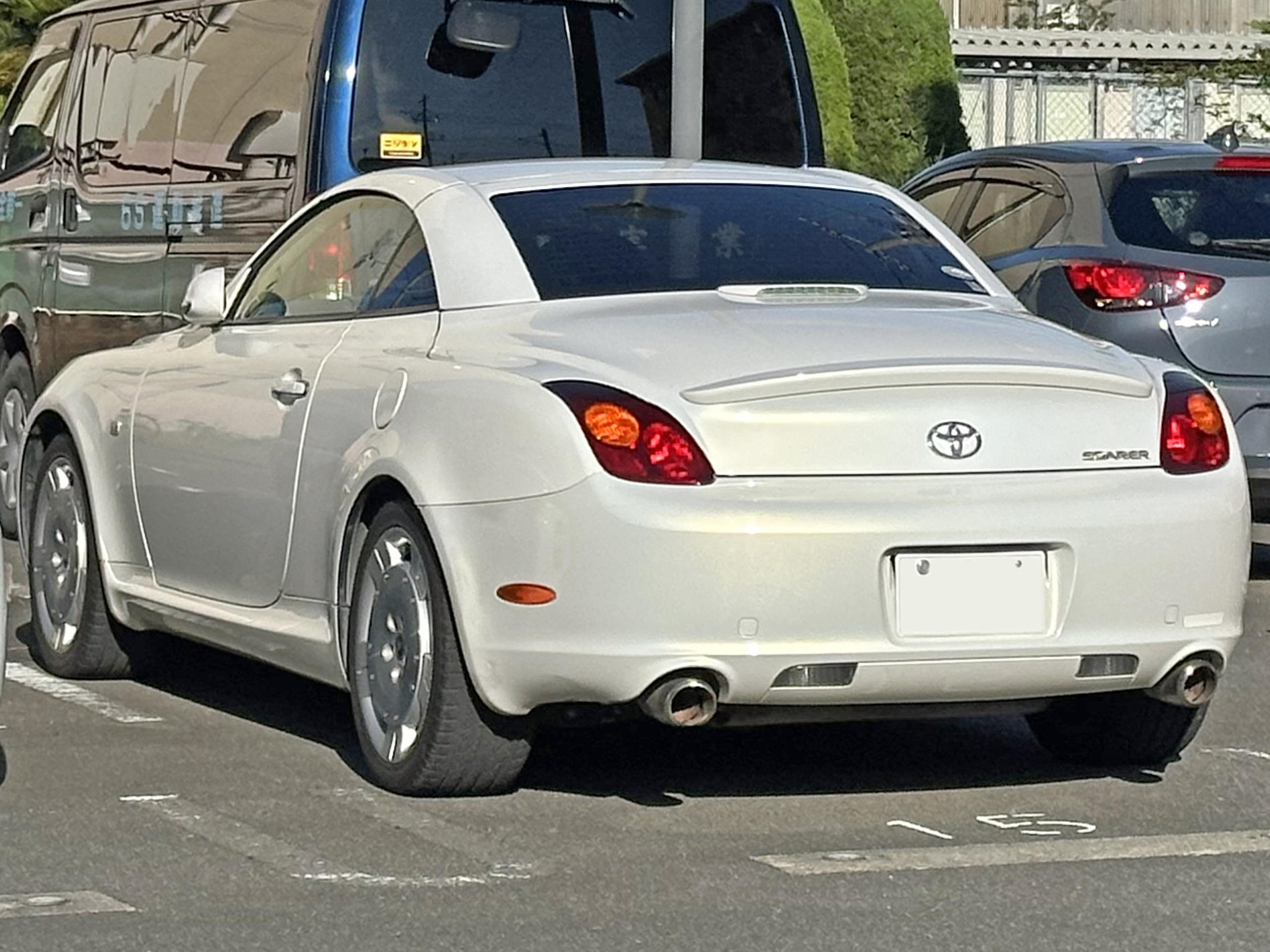
Toyota Soarer (Z40)

The 40-series Soarer model was largely identical to its Lexus equivalent, sold outside Japan as the Lexus SC 430 since 2001. The Z40 series Soarer 430SCV featured a hardtop which could fold into the boot of the car, in the fashion of the contemporary Mercedes-Benz SL. It was equipped with the 3UZ-FE VVTi (variable valve timing) 4.3-litre V8 engine, as was available in the Lexus LS 430 luxury sedan. It was rated at 280 PS (206 kW; 276 hp) and 430 N⋅m (317 lb⋅ft) of torque. This enabled the coupé to accelerate from a standstill to 100 km/h (62 mph) in 6 seconds. The shared body style of the Z40 series Soarer/SC 430 was developed by Toyota designers at design studios in France and Japan. Compared with the Z30 series, some observers generally considered the fourth generation a retreat in visual style due to its more compact and top heavy appearance.

With the Z40 series Soarer, design and production synergies culminated in the development of a single shared design configuration for both the Soarer and Lexus models, unlike the previous generations. The rise of Lexus as Toyota's premium worldwide marque also contributed to the design focus on the Lexus model configuration rather than a separate Toyota-branded series of Soarer coupes. On July 26, 2005, Lexus was introduced in Japan with the 2006 SC 430 TSOOH in its lineup. The debut of Lexus and the SC 430 coincided with the conclusion of Toyota Soarer sales, after 6,486 examples had been sold with Soarer badging.
