= Maserati Merak =

Mid-engined sports car produced by Maserati between 1972 and 1983

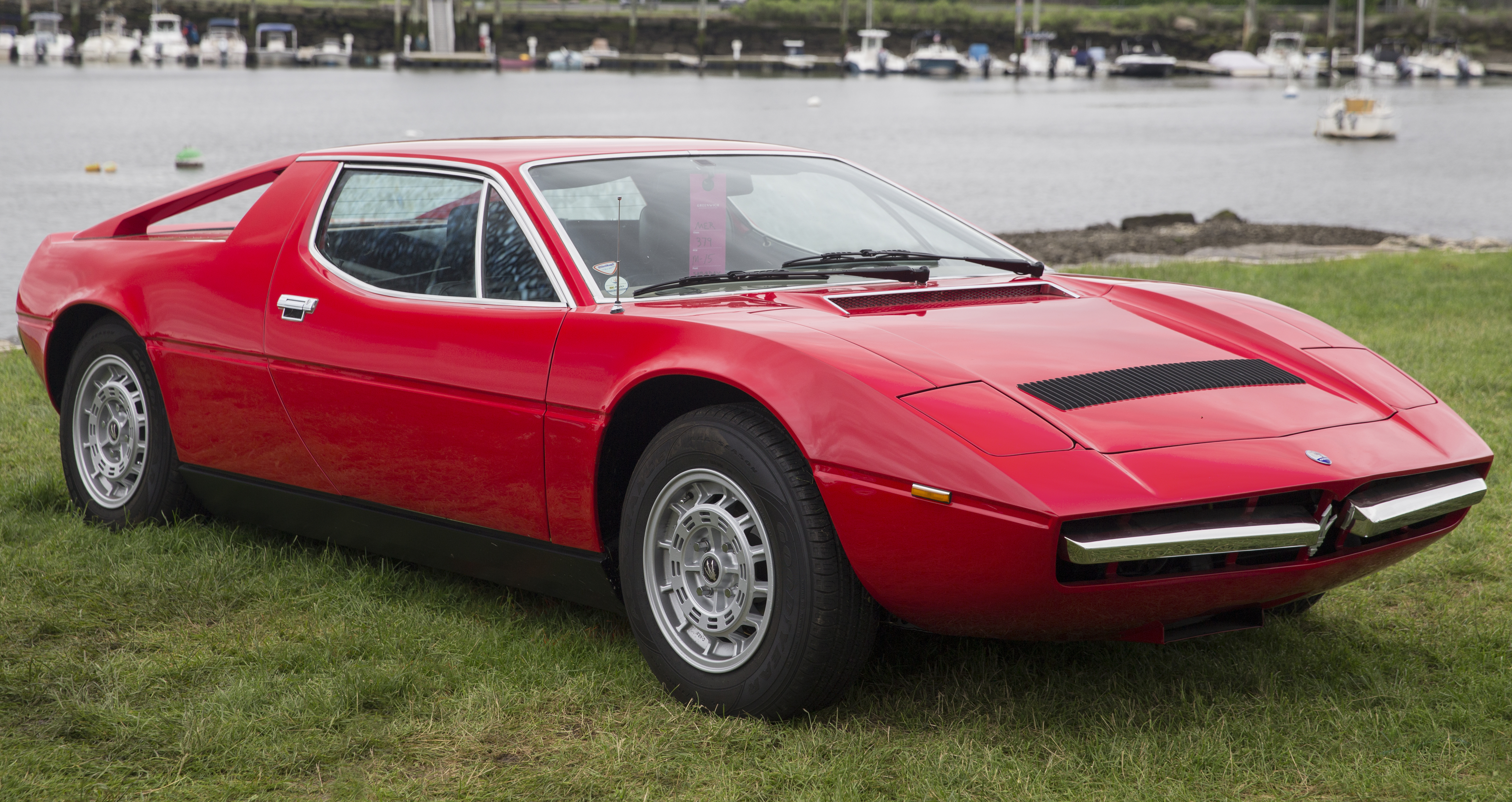

Overview
- Manufacturer: Maserati
- Production: 1972–1983; 1,830 produced
- Assembly: Italy: Modena
- Designer: Giorgetto Giugiaro at Italdesign

Body and chassis
- Class: Sports car (S)
- Body style: 2-door 2+2 coupé
- Layout: Rear mid-engine, rear-wheel drive layout
- Related: Maserati Bora; Citroën SM

Powertrain
- Engine: 3.0 L 90° V6; 2.0 L 90° V6
- Transmission: 5-speed Citroën C35 manual

Dimensions
- Wheelbase: 2,600 mm (102.4 in)
- Length: 4,335 mm (170.7 in)
- Width: 1,768 mm (69.6 in)
- Height: 1,134 mm (44.6 in)
- Kerb weight: 1,400–1,430 kg (3,086–3,153 lb) (dry)

The Maserati Merak (Tipo AM122) is a mid-engined 2+2 sports car produced by Maserati between 1972 and 1983. The Merak was closely related to the Maserati Bora, sharing part of its structure and body panels, but was powered by a 3.0 L V6 in place of the latter's 4.7 L V8. The extra cabin space gained by fitting a smaller and more compact powertrain was used to carve out a second row of seats—suitable for children or very small adults—making the Merak not just a less expensive alternative to the Bora but also a 2+2.

== History ==
The Maserati Merak was introduced at the 1972 Paris Auto Show, over a year after the Bora. The model was named after Merak, a star in the constellation of Ursa Major. The Merak shares the front part of its bodyshell with the Bora up to the doors. The front ends differ, mainly by the use of dual chrome bumpers on the Merak, in place of twin trapezoidal grilles on the Bora, but the similarities end at the B-pillar.

Giorgetto Giugiaro at Italdesign was commissioned to transform the Bora into the Merak. Unlike its bigger sister the Merak doesn't have a full glass fastback, but rather a cabin ending abruptly with a vertical rear window and a flat, horizontal engine cover pierced by four series of ventilation slats. Giugiaro completed the vehicle's silhouette by adding open flying buttresses, visually extending the roofline to the tail.

The main competitors of the Merak were the similarly Italian, mid-engine, 3-litre and 2+2 Dino 308 GT4 and Lamborghini Urraco. However unlike its transverse V8-engined rivals the Merak used a more compact V6, that could therefore be mounted longitudinally.

Having been designed during the Citroën ownership of Maserati (1968–1975) certain Citroën hydropneumatic systems were used in the Merak and the early Merak SS. In these cars the braking system was hydraulically assisted and operated, and the pop-up headlights hydraulically actuated. The clutches on these cars used the same hydropneumatic system as the brakes, but only some cars included servo assistance on the clutch. After 1976, when the French manufacturer gave up control of Maserati, the Citroën-derived parts were gradually replaced by more conventional systems.

When Alejandro de Tomaso purchased Maserati in 1977, the Bora was discontinued after a production run of less than 600 cars, while the Merak remained on sale for six more years.

== Specifications ==
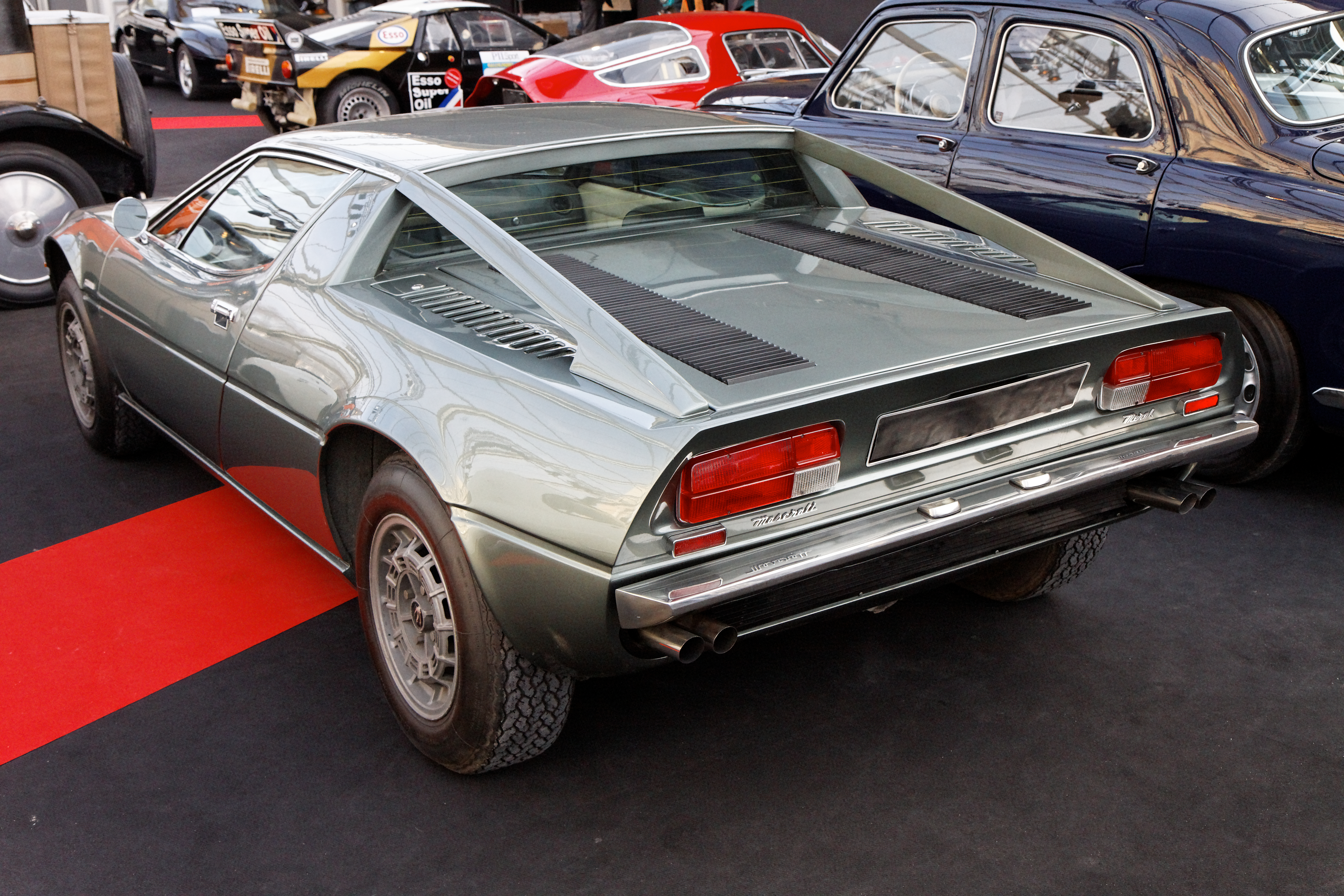
The rear view of an early Merak

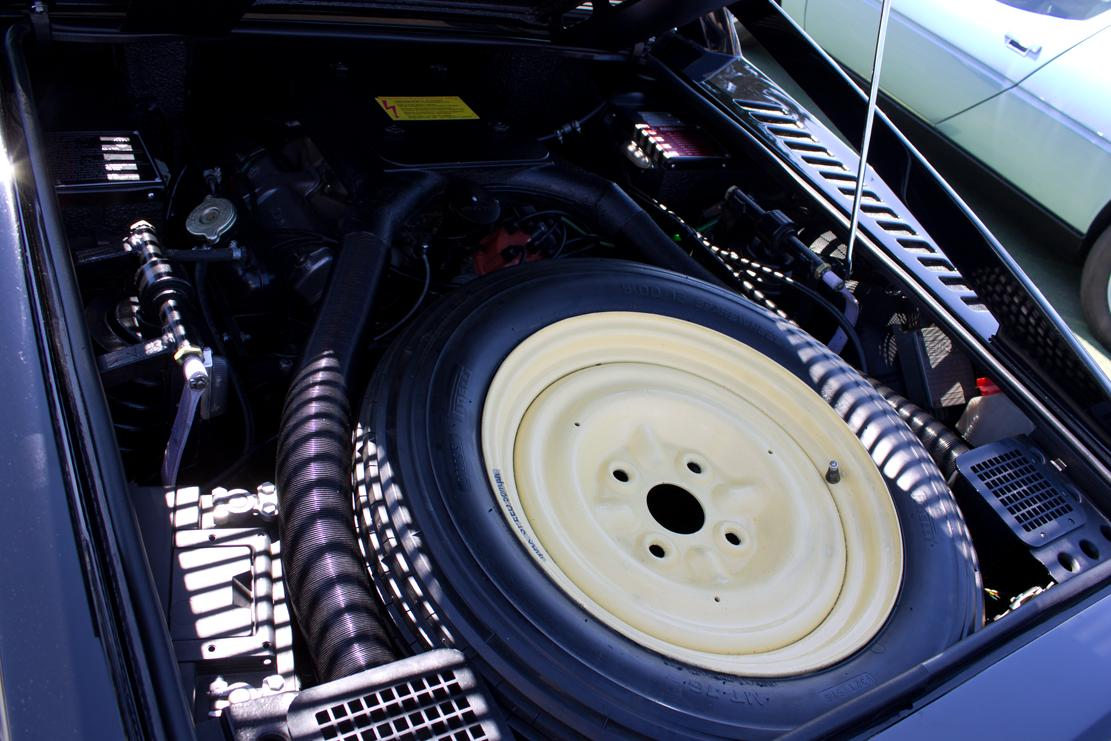
The spare tyre in the engine compartment

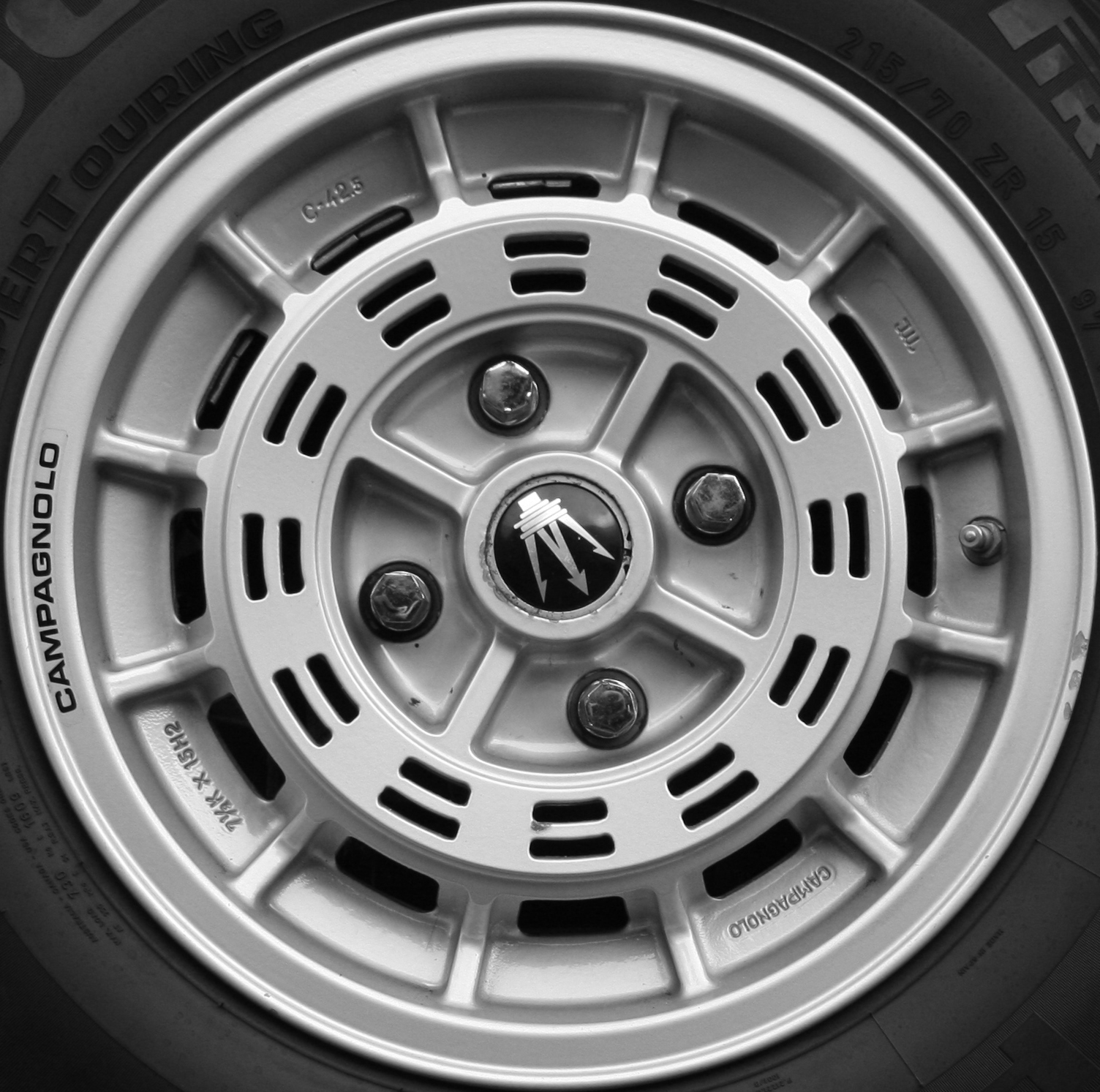
The light alloy Campagnolo 7½J x 15" wheels used on the Merak

The Merak used a steel monocoque construction paired to a rear tubular subframe supporting the powertrain and rear suspension. This was of unequal length A-arms type all around, with coaxial coil springs and telescopic shock absorbers. The braking system consisted of discs on both axles with the front ones vented. On early models with the Citroën hydraulics, the rear brakes were inboard so as to reduce the unsprung weight.

Wheels were cast light alloy Campagnolo 7½J x 15", fitted with Michelin XWX tyres measuring 185/70 at the front and 205/70 at the rear. The compact spare tyre was stored in the engine compartment, above the transmission. On most US delivered models, the spare tyre was full size, requiring a modification to the engine cover (the humpback) and lowering the muffler.

The Merak's V6 engine descended from the 2.7 L Tipo C.114 originally designed by Giulio Alfieri in 1967 for use in the Citroën SM, that was bored out to 91.6 mm (piston stroke remained 75 mm) to displace 3 litres (2,965 cc). It was a chain-driven double overhead camshaft, 12-valve unit featuring an unusual 90-degree angle between the cylinder banks as it was a version of Maserati's V8 engine with one pair of cylinders removed. The lubrication system used a wet sump and an oil cooler.

The powerplant was mounted longitudinally behind the passenger compartment, and joined through a single-plate dry clutch to a 5-speed, all synchromesh Citroën transaxle gearbox and a standard open differential.

== Models ==
=== Merak ===
The original Merak's three-litre engine was rated at 190 PS (140 kW; 187 hp) at 6,000 rpm and 255 N⋅m (188 lb⋅ft) of torque at 4,000 rpm. Three twin-choke Weber carburetors (one 42 DCNF 31 and two 42 DCNF 32) fed the engine, and the compression ratio was 8.75:1. Maserati declared a top speed of over 240 km/h (149 mph).

Early left hand drive Meraks (1972 to 1975) were fitted with the same dashboard as the Citroën SM, characterized by oval instrument gauges inset in a brushed metal fascia and a single-spoke steering wheel. 630 cars were made in this configuration up to 1974. Right hand drive Meraks from this period were fitted with the same dashboard as the Bora with a three-spoke steering wheel.

=== Merak SS ===
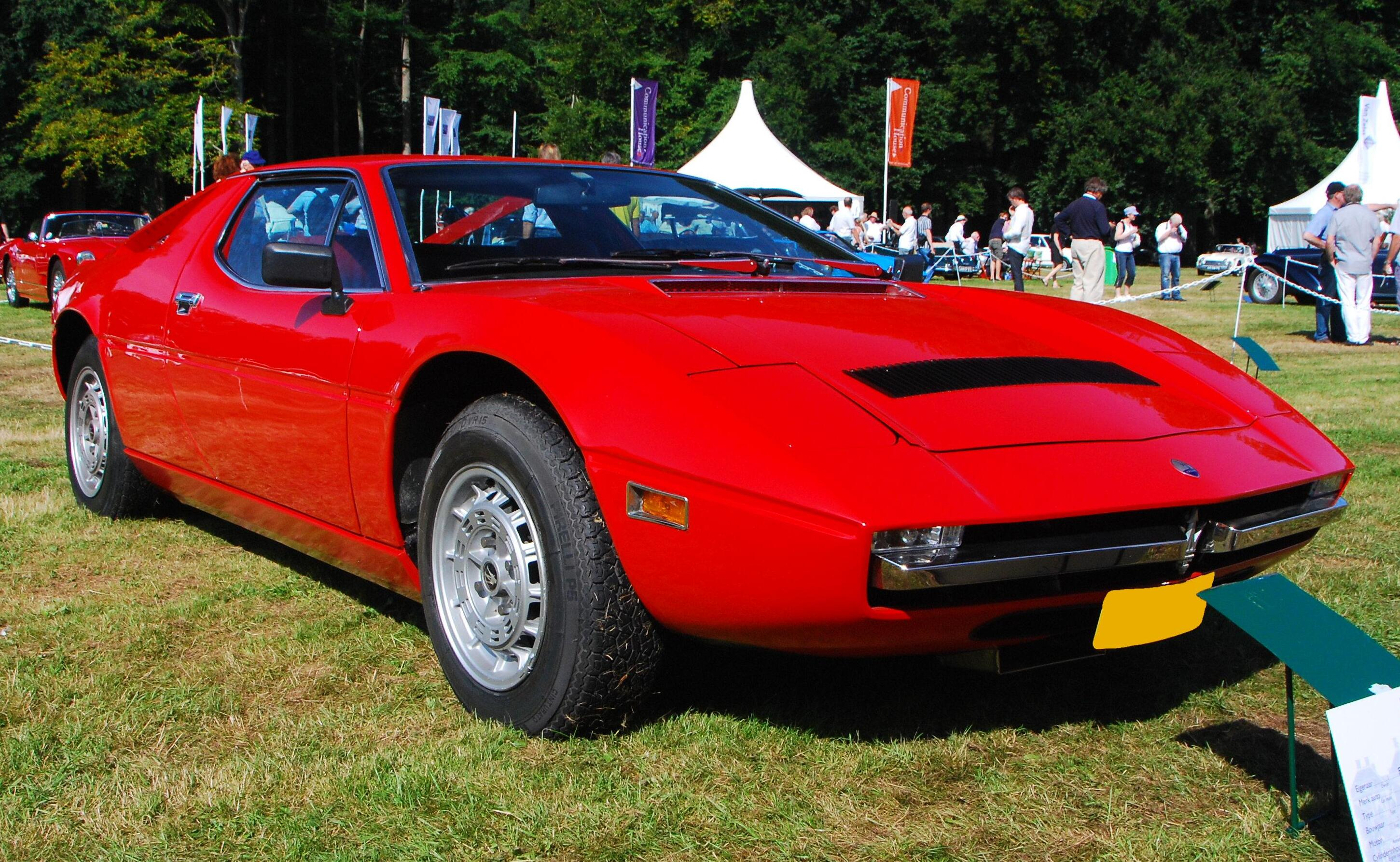
Maserati Merak SS

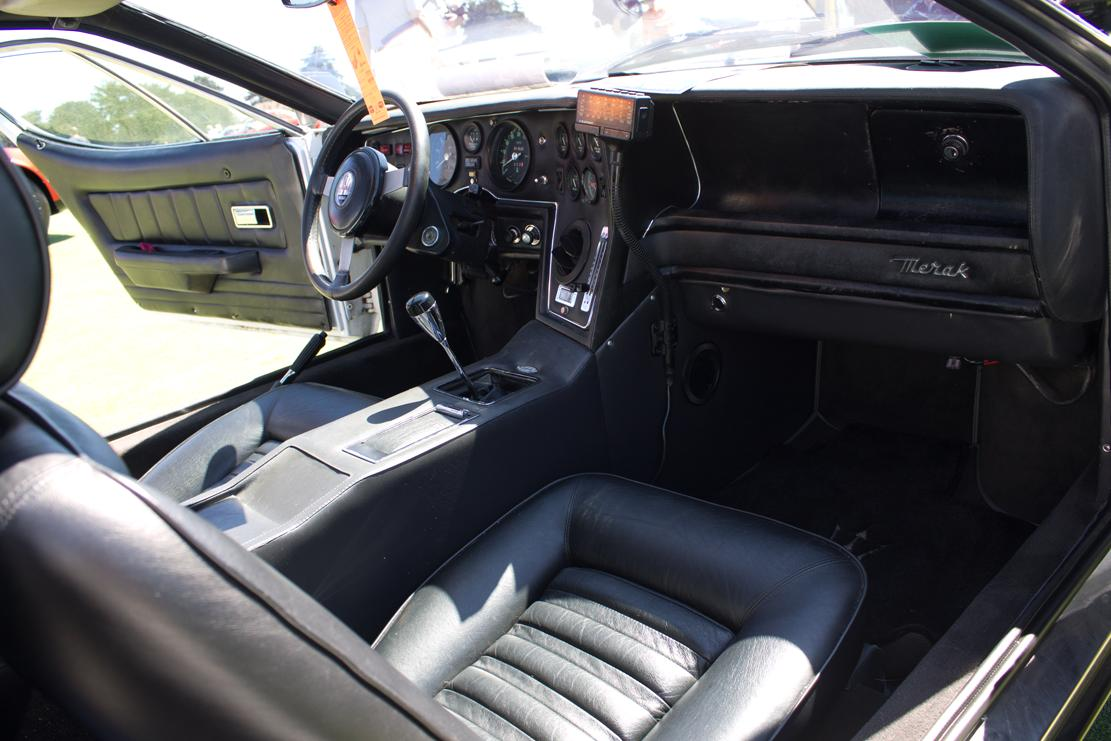
Interior showing the three-spoke steering wheel

The lightweight and more powerful Merak SS (Tipo AM122/A) was introduced at the 41st Geneva Motor Show in March 1975, although it did not enter production until the next year. The SS featured a 50 kg (110 lb) weight reduction and a 30 PS power increase to 220 PS (162 kW; 217 hp), due to the adoption of three larger 44 DCNF 44 carburettors and a higher 9:1 compression ratio. The SS was recognizable from a black grille between the pop-up headlights. A Maserati-designed upper fascia with round instruments and a four-spoke steering wheel replaced the previous SM-derived interior. Later cars were bestowed with the full driver-oriented dashboard and three-spoke padded steering wheel of the Maserati Bora. The US-spec version of the Merak SS also saw a return to traditional hydraulics, eliminating the last of the Citroën high pressure system. 1000 units of the SS had been made by 1983, when the Merak was discontinued.

=== Merak 2000 GT ===
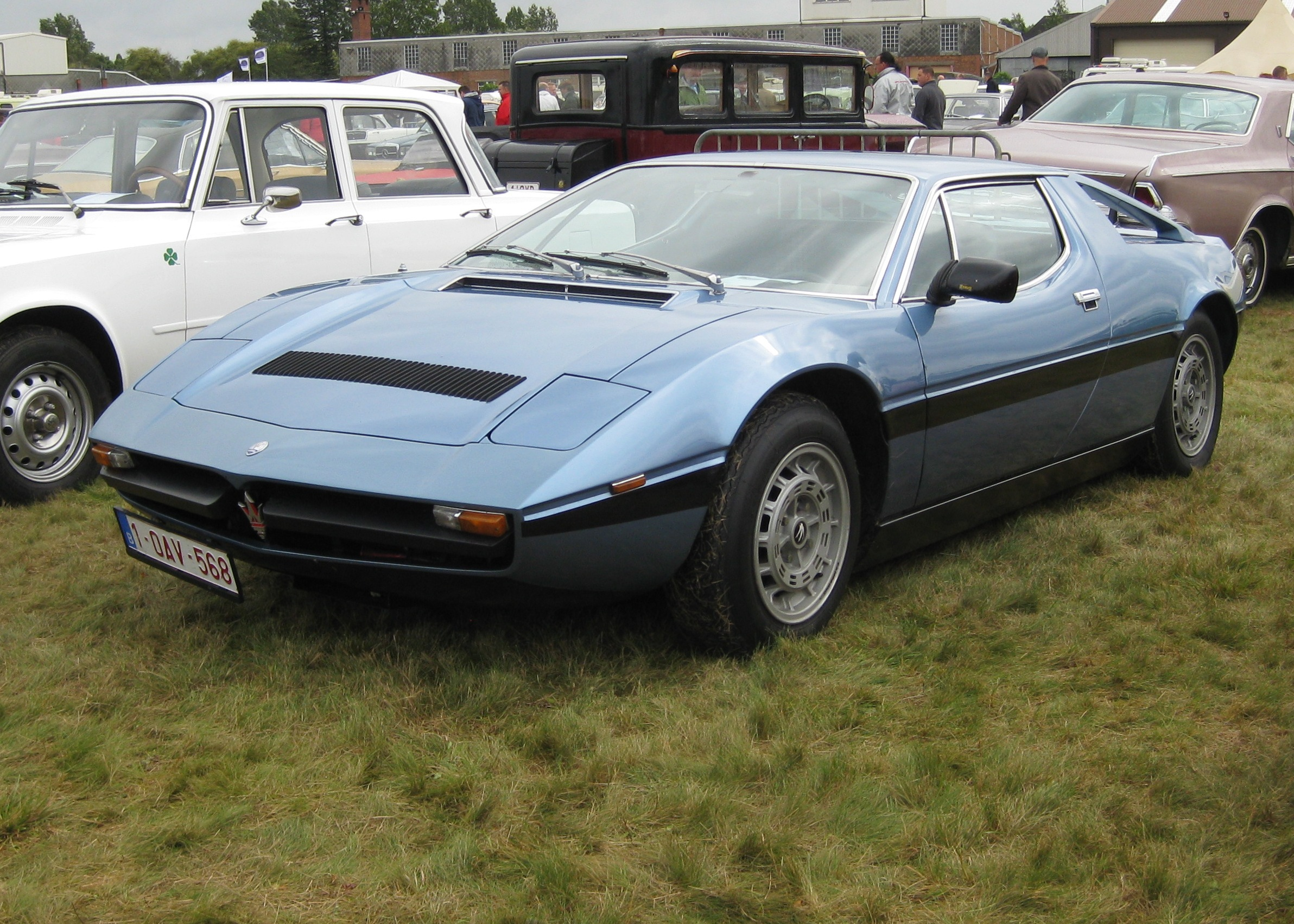
Maserati Merak 2000 GT

In November 1977, at the Turin Auto Show, Alejandro de Tomaso presented the Merak 2000 GT (Tipo AM122/D), basically a Merak with a smaller two-litre powerplant. It was built almost exclusively for the Italian market, where a newly introduced law strongly penalized cars with engine capacity over 2,000 cc by subjecting them to a 38% Value Added Tax (VAT) against the usual 19% VAT. The Merak's competitors were similar two-litre models, specifically the Urraco P200 and Dino 208 GT4.

The Merak 2000 GT featured a 2-litre (1,999 cc) engine rated at 170 PS (125 kW; 168 hp) at 7,000 rpm and 186 N⋅m (137 lb⋅ft) at 4,000 rpm, obtained by de-stroking and de-boring the V6 to 80 mm × 66.3 mm (3.1 in × 2.6 in).

Colour choice was limited to two shades: metallic light blue or gold. The two-litre cars were also distinguished by a black tape stripe running just below the mid-body character line, matte black bumpers in place of the usual chrome and the absence of the front spoiler, available as an option. The SS's front bonnet with the grille between the headlights was used on 2000 GTs. When production ended in 1983 just 200 of the 2-litre engined cars had been made.
