= Maserati Khamsin =

Italian grand touring car

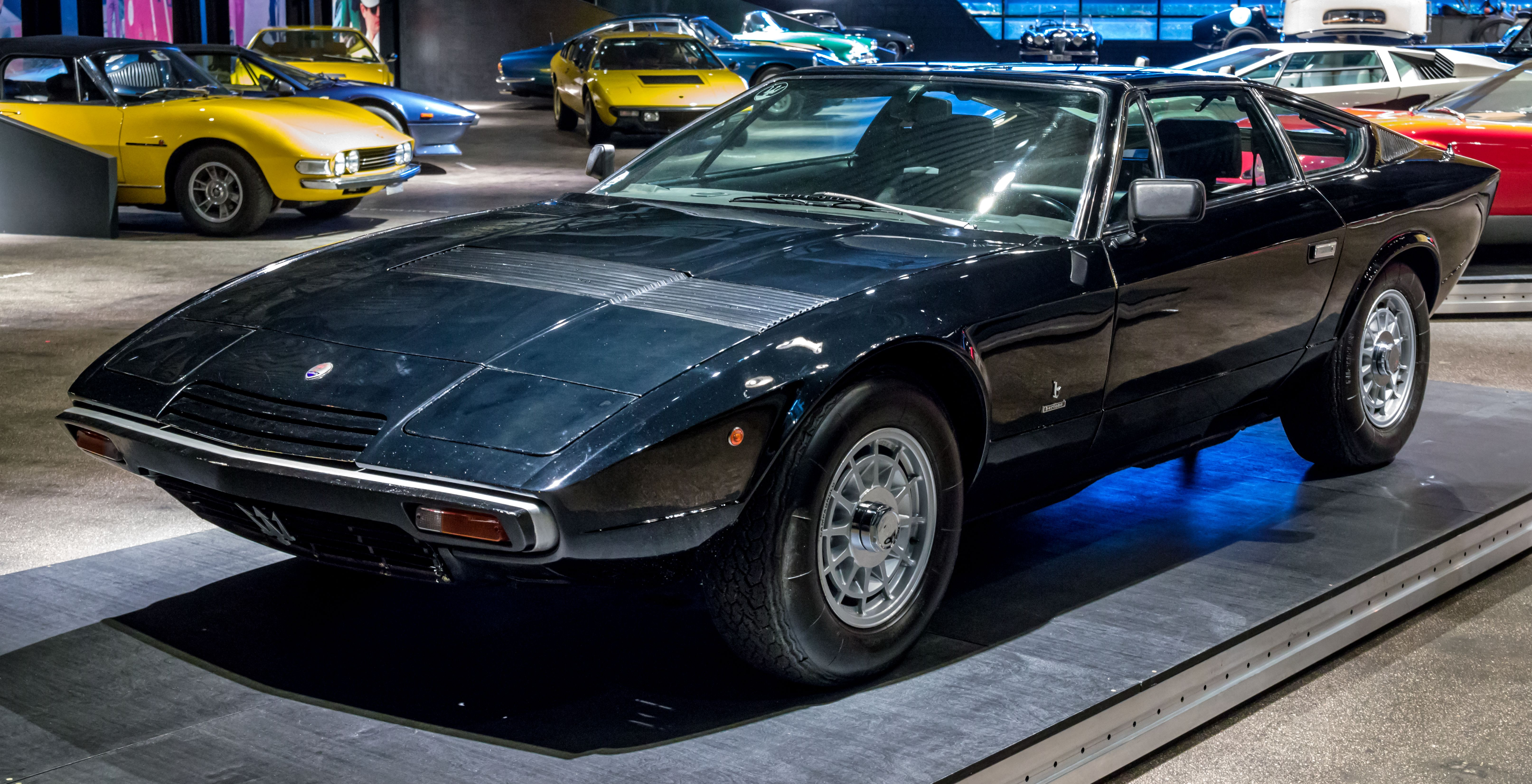

Overview
- Manufacturer: Maserati
- Production: 1974–1982; 435 produced
- Assembly: Italy: Modena
- Designer: Marcello Gandini at Bertone

Body and chassis
- Class: Grand tourer (S)
- Body style: 2-door 2+2 coupé
- Layout: Front mid-engine, rear-wheel-drive

Powertrain
- Engine: 4.9 L AM 115.10.49 V8
- Transmission: 5-speed ZF manual 3-speed Borg Warner automatic

Dimensions
- Wheelbase: 2,550 mm (100.4 in)
- Length: 4,400 mm (173.2 in)
- Width: 1,804 mm (71.0 in)
- Height: 1,180 mm (46.5 in)
- Kerb weight: 1,500 kg (3,307 lb)

Chronology
- Predecessor: Maserati Ghibli (AM115)
- Successor: Maserati Shamal

The Maserati Khamsin (Tipo AM120) is a grand tourer produced by Italian automobile manufacturer Maserati between 1974 and 1982. The Khamsin was sold alongside the DeTomaso-based Maserati Kyalami - also a V8 GT car - between 1976 and 1982.

Following Maserati's tradition it was named after a wind: the Khamsin, a hot, violent gust blowing in the Egyptian desert for fifty days a year.

== History ==
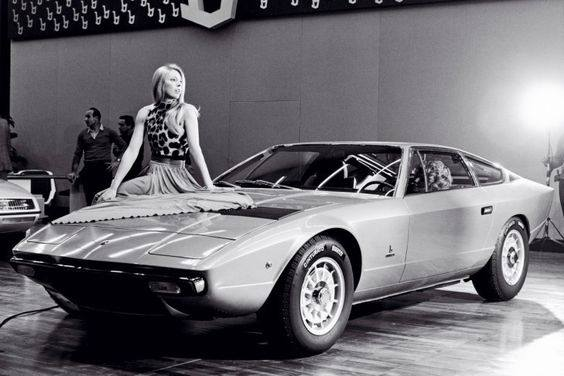
At Turin Auto Show in 1972

The Khamsin was introduced on the Bertone stand at the November 1972 Turin Auto Show as a concept car. Designed by Marcello Gandini, it was Bertone's first work for Maserati. Its design highlight was a clear rear section which housed the tail lights along with a sharp, angular design in contrast to its predecessor. In March 1973, the production model was shown at the Paris Motor Show. Regular production of the vehicle started only a year later, in 1974.

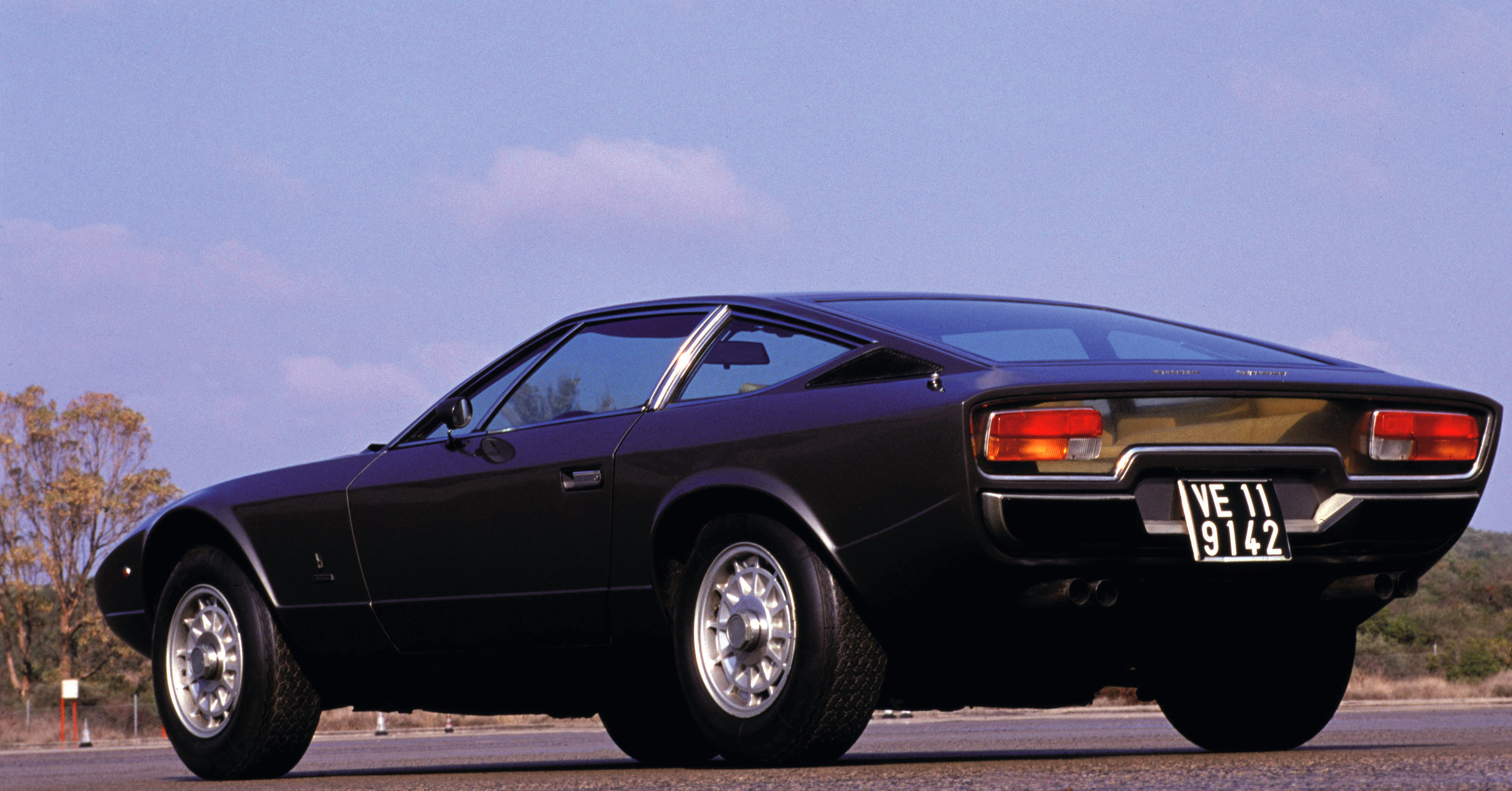
Rear view

The Khamsin was developed under Citroën's ownership for a clientele that demanded a front-engined grand tourer on the lines of the previous Ghibli, a more conventional proposition than the mid-engined Bora.

In 1977 a mild facelift added three horizontal slats on the Khamsin's nose to aid cooling. Inside, it brought a restyled dashboard and a new padded steering wheel.

Despite the many improvements over its predecessor, the Khamsin did not replicate its success, partly due to the ongoing fuel crisis that reduced demand for cars with large displacement engines.

Production ended in 1982, with 435 vehicles made, 155 of which had been exported to the United States - barely a third of the Ghibli's production total of 1,295.

== Design ==
The Khamsin's body is prominently wedge-shaped, with a fastback roofline and kammback rear end. The tail is characterized by a full-width glass rear panel, carrying inset "floating" tail lights.

Combined with the wide, almost all-glass rear hatch this gave exceptional rear visibility in comparison to most cars, especially similar sports cars. Cosmetic triangular vented panels are inlaid in the C-pillar, with the right-hand one hiding the fuel filler cap. Another distinguishing feature is the bonnet, pierced by asymmetrical vents. Design features such as the wedge body, glazed tail panel and the location of the fuel filler cap all carry Gandini's signature. They were all present on his earlier Lamborghini Espada.

Despite being marketed as a 2+2, the leather-trimmed rear seats, nestled between the two fuel tanks, were found too lacking in headroom and legroom to be usable.

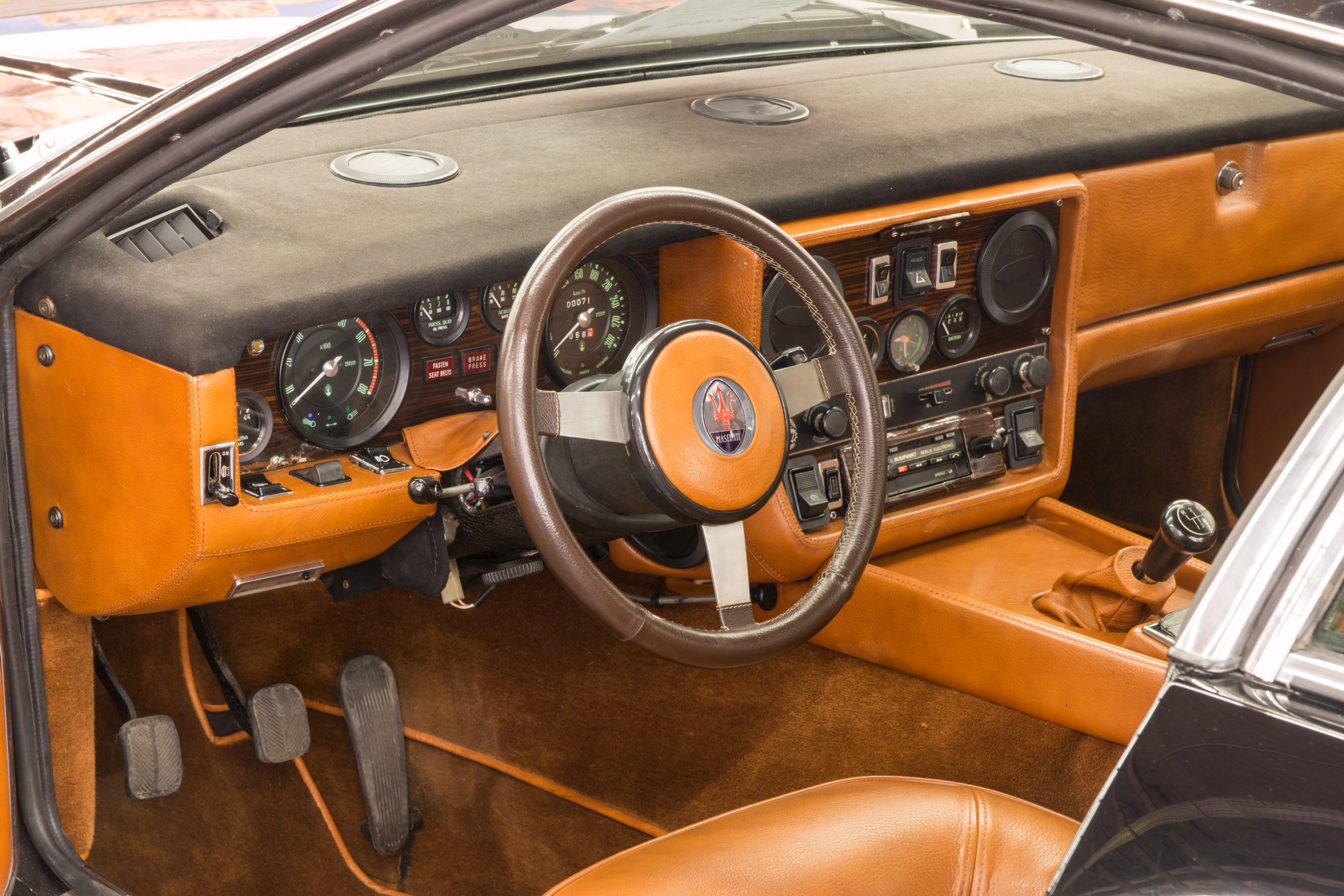
Interior

The complete instrumentation included gauges for speedometer, tachometer, water temperature, oil temperature, oil pressure, voltmeter and a clock.

== Specifications ==
The Khamsin used an all-steel monocoque construction, with a rear Silentbloc-bushing insulated tubular subframe supporting the rear suspension and differential. Suspension was double wishbones all around - a major improvement over the Ghibli's leaf-sprung solid axle - with coaxial springs and shock absorbers (single upfront, double at the rear) and anti-roll bars.

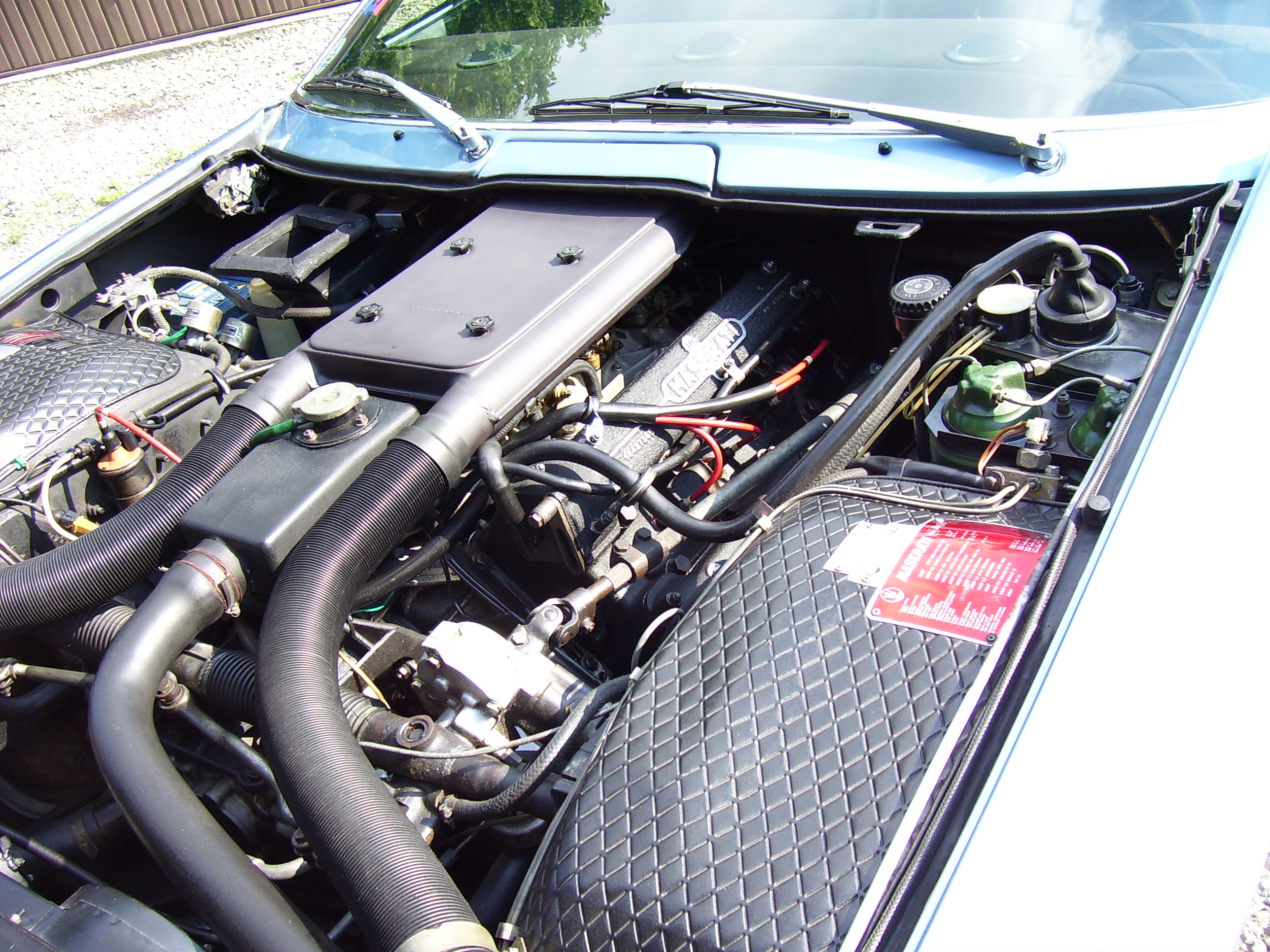
Khamsin's engine bay. The green components are part of the hydraulic system.

The front-mid mounted engine gave the car a 50/50 weight distribution; it was pushed so far back towards the firewall that the full size spare tyre could be stored beneath the radiator in front of it, thus freeing up space in the boot. Apart from the adoption of Bosch electronic ignition, Maserati's 4.9 L (4,930 cc) DOHC, 16-valve V8 engine was carried over from the Ghibli SS and delivered 240 kW (330 PS; 320 hp) at 5,500 rpm and 482.0 N⋅m (355.5 lb⋅ft) of torque at 4,000 rpm. It was fed through four double barrel 42 DCNF 41 Weber carburetors and used dry-sump lubrication. The dual fuel tanks were retained from the Ghibli, but not of similar size. A small tank is on the right and it is connected to the main tank below the cargo floor, with a single fuel filler on the right hand side feeding directly the small tank. The dual exhaust system ended with two resonators, each with twin exhaust tips.

Power was routed to the rear wheels through a 5-speed, all synchromesh ZF manual gearbox with a single-plate dry clutch; a 3-speed Borg Warner automatic transmission was also available on request. The car rode on 215/70 Michelin XWX or Pirelli Cinturato CN12 tyres on 7½J 15" Campagnolo alloy wheels.

Having been developed under the Citroën ownership, the Khamsin made large use of its high-pressure hydraulic systems. The power steering used the Citroën SM's DIRAVI speed-sensitive variable assistance, which made steering lighter for easier parking and decreased its intervention with speed. The all-round vented disc brakes and the clutch command were both hydraulically actuated and assisted. The adjustable seats and the pop-up headlights were also hydraulically actuated. An adjustable steering column (an innovative feature at the time), air conditioning, electric windows, a radio and full leather upholstery were standard.

Maserati claimed a 270 km/h (170 mph) top speed for the European-specification model. The Citroën SM-derived power steering is not power "assisted", but rather full power with no mechanical connection between the steering wheel shaft and the steering linkage yoke attached to the power piston rod. Only if hydraulic pressure is lost will the mechanical pinion gear drive the rack gear, and that with significant free play at the steering wheel rim. In normal operation the rack gear, which is connected to the power piston rod, turns the pinion to give feedback to the power valve. This is exactly like the Citroën DS, though the mechanical arrangement is quite different. The power is the same at all speeds as the steering hydraulic pressure is supplied directly from the main pressure accumulator "sphere". A flyweight driven by the transmission output shaft controls the hydraulic pressure supplied to the piston of the steering shaft centring cylinder, which presses a roller against a heart-shaped cam geared 2:1 to the steering input shaft. In automatic transmission cars the pressure is tapped from the automatic transmission hydraulic pressure to a control valve, similarly to the setup on the Citroën SM. ATF and LHM (central hydraulic system fluid) do not mix, and are at quite different pressures. At standstill enough pressure is applied to recentre the steering. At high speeds (approximately 80 mph/130 kmh in the Citroën SM) the centring force is at maximum, which makes the steering wheel very strongly resistant to being turned by the driver ("stiff"). By this strategy the steering can be very quick (2 turns lock-to-lock in the Citroën SM), yet not sensitive to the "sneeze factor" at high speed.

== Aftermarket modifications ==
One Khamsin (chassis 1030) was professionally converted to a Spyder (convertible), by the US Maserati distributor. This vehicle sold at auction for EUR 76,375 (US$100,445) in 2007.

One Khamsin (chassis 1142) was professionally converted to a T-Top by Hurst Hatches on behalf of Bob Grossmann, the US west coast distributor of Maserati Automobiles in California. This vehicle sold at auction for EUR €195,500 (US$221,200) in 2015.

Recent Khamsin sales reflect the car's rarity, including the 2015 auction of a non-running, low mileage car, sold for EUR €162,400 (US$175,411) at Artcurial.

Luxembourg-based trading house Khamsin Capital is named after the founders' mutual appreciation of the Khamsin, which they believe to be the ultimate wedge-shaped supercar of the 70s.

== US-spec models ==
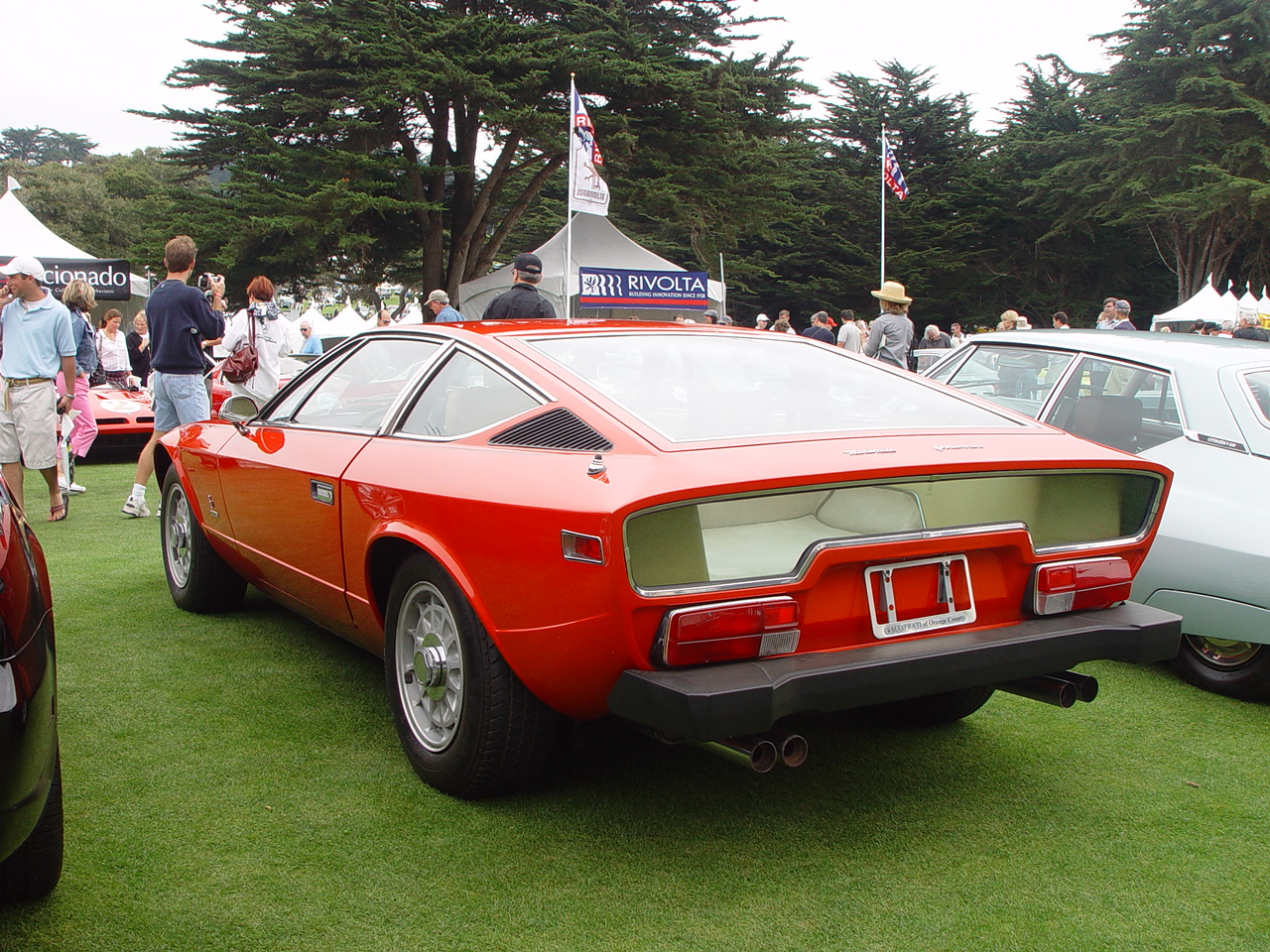
US-spec Maserati Khamsin

Khamsin models destined for the United States were subject to significant design alterations to comply with newly enacted legislation with respect to bumper height/strength and placement of tail lights. Maserati and Bertone designer Marcello Gandini strongly objected to the NHTSA's decision prohibiting tail light assembly fitment in the rear vertical glass panel. After a lengthy and unfruitful appeal process, Maserati ultimately capitulated to obtain federalization of the Khamsin and introduce it to their most vital export market.

The federalized Khamsin went on sale in 1975. These models required fitting a solid version of the glass tail panel. The tail lights had to be moved downward, to the rear bumpers' former location; the new, protruding bumper was mounted below the tail lights. This new configuration of components left the exhaust tips unable to clear the bumper, a problem resolved by flipping the exhaust resonators upside down. The front bumper was also replaced by a thick rubber bumper. Square side markers found their way on the front and rear fenders. The engine received revisions as well, gaining smog control equipment (air injection, thermal reactors in the exhaust manifolds, different carburettors and leaner fuel mixture) reducing its power output by 5 hp.

American automotive publications and the buying public found this visually awkward arrangement to be an unattractive compromise compared with the intended design available to the rest of the world.
