= Citroën SM =

Car produced by Citroën from 1970 to 1975

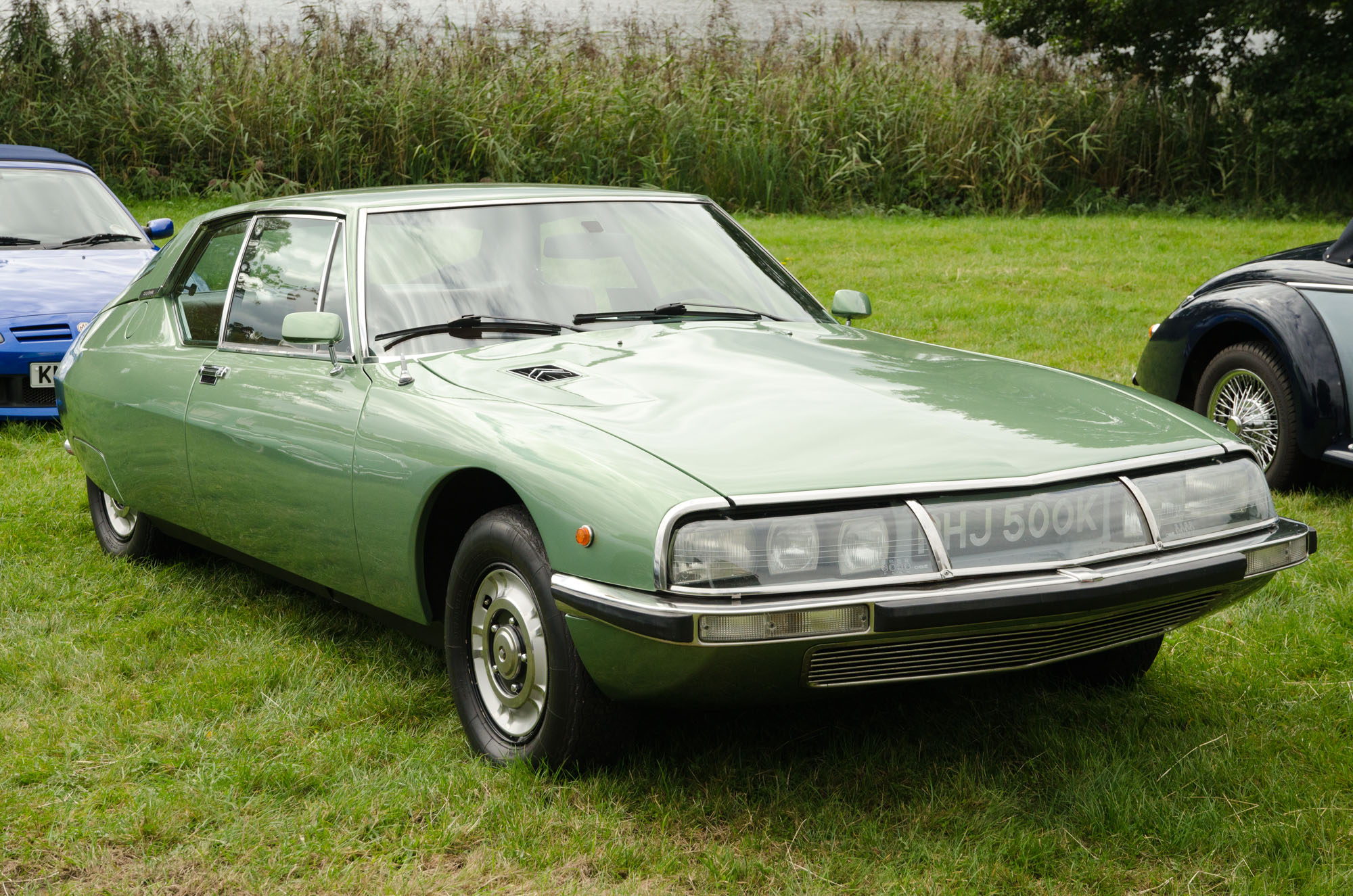

Overview
- Manufacturer: Citroën
- Production: 1970–1975
- Assembly: France: Javel, Paris; France: Abrest
- Designer: Robert Opron

Body and chassis
- Class: Grand tourer
- Body style: 3-door hatchback coupé
- Layout: MF layout
- Related: Citroën DS; Maserati Merak; Maserati Quattroporte II

Powertrain
- Engine: 2.7 L 90° V6; 3.0 L 90° V6
- Transmission: 5-speed manual 3-speed automatic

Dimensions
- Wheelbase: 2,900 mm (114.2 in)
- Length: 4,893 mm (192.6 in)
- Width: 1,836 mm (72.3 in)
- Height: 1,324 mm (52.1 in)
- Curb weight: 1,460 kg (3,219 lb) (carburetted version); 1,520 kg (3,351 lb) (fuel-injection version)

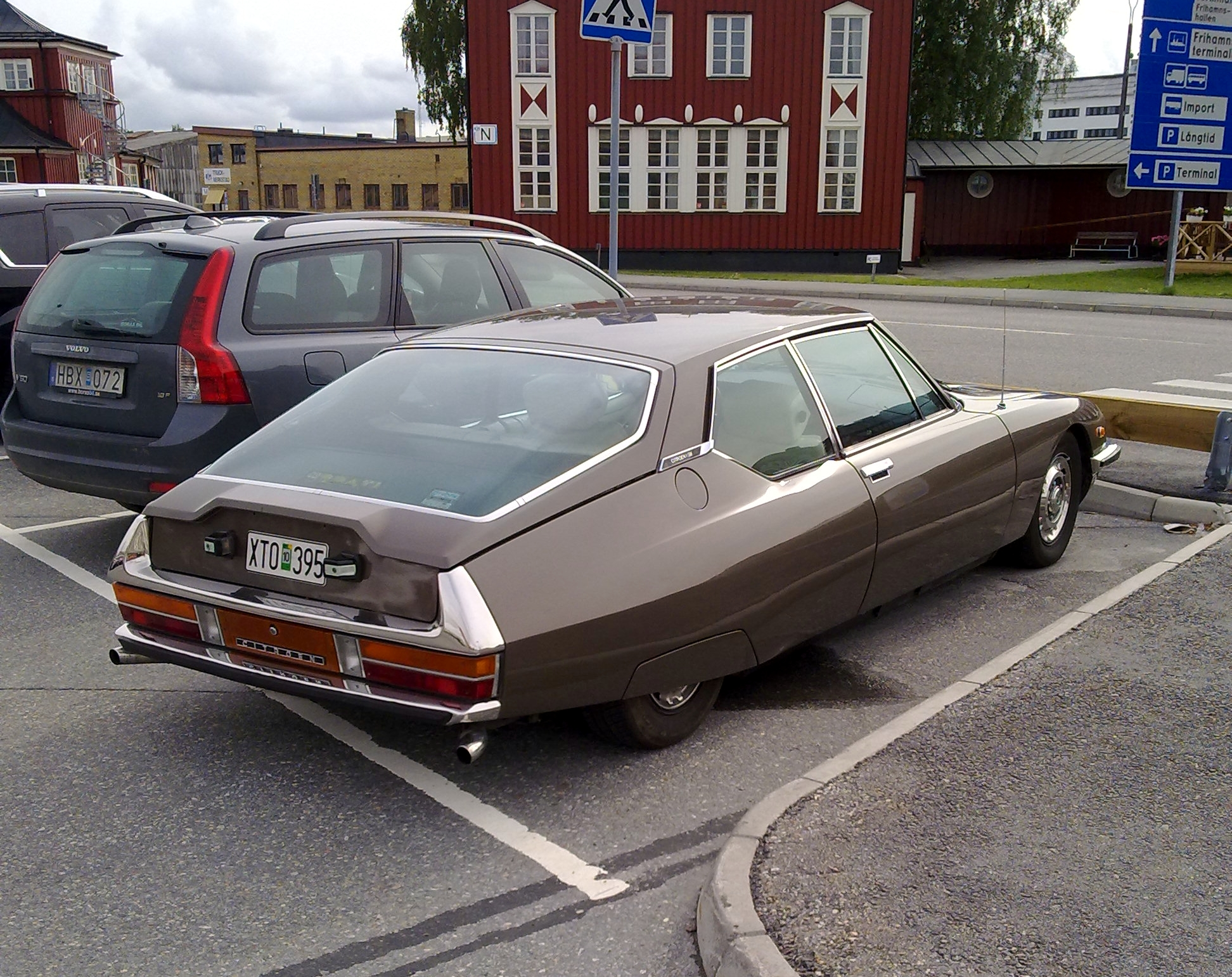
Rear view – in low position

The Citroën SM is a high-performance coupé produced by the French manufacturer Citroën from 1970 to 1975. The SM placed third in the 1971 European Car of the Year contest, trailing its stablemate Citroën GS, and won the 1972 Motor Trend Car of the Year award in the US.

== History ==
In 1961, Citroën began work on 'Project S' – a sports variant of the Citroën DS. As was customary for the firm, many running concept vehicles were developed, increasingly complex and upmarket from the DS. At some stage in the 9-year project, it evolved from developing a faster variant of the 1955 DS to developing an entirely new, thoroughly engineered car – in terms of engineering effort, a replacement for the high volume DS model. Citroën purchased Maserati in 1968 with the intention of harnessing Maserati's high-performance engine technology to produce a true Gran Tourer car, combining the sophisticated Citroën suspension with a Maserati V6.

The result was the Citroën SM, first shown at the Geneva Motor Show in March 1970. It went on sale in France in September of that year. Factory produced cars were all left-hand-drive, although RHD conversions were done in the UK and Australia.

This car was unusual for France – production of luxury cars was heavily restricted in the country by post-World War II puissance fiscale horsepower tax, so France had not had a production vehicle in this market sector since before World War II. The SM had an engine of only 2.7 liters owing to these regulations; it was the first response to the luxury/performance sector since the export oriented Chrysler Hemi V8 engine Facel Vega in the late 1950s. Citroën's flagship vehicle competed with high-performance GTs of the time from other nations and manufacturers, such as Jaguar, Ferrari, Aston Martin, Alfa Romeo, Mercedes-Benz, Porsche and Maserati's Merak.

The origin of the model name 'SM' is not completely clear. The 'S' may derive from the Project 'S' designation, the aim of which was to produce what is essentially a sports variant of the Citroën DS, and the 'M' perhaps refers to Maserati, hence SM is often assumed to stand for "Systeme Maserati" or "Sports Maserati". Another common alternative is Série Maserati, but others have suggested it is short for 'Sa Majesté' (Her Majesty in French), which aligns with the common DS model's nickname 'La déesse' (The Goddess).

The SM did not find a sufficient customer base in the small European GT market, but much of the SM's technology was carried forward to the successful Citroën CX, launched in 1974 the DIRAVI steering being the most obvious example. The same basic engine in enlarged 3.0 L form (some in Italy had 2.0 L) was used in Maserati's own Merak (1,800 units) and later with some modification in the Biturbo (40,000 units). The Merak, Khamsin, and Bora, used Citroën's high-pressure hydraulics for some functions, and the Citroën gearbox in the Merak, during the Citroën-Maserati alliance.

== Performance ==
Contemporary automotive journalists were effusive about the SM's dynamic qualities, which were unlike anything they had experienced before. The SM provided a combination of comfort, sharp handling, and braking not available in any other car at the time. The magazine Popular Science reported that the SM had the shortest stopping distance of any car they had tested.

Automotive journalists marveled at the resulting ability to travel for hours at 200 km/h (124 mph) in comfort. In 1972 Motorsport (U.K.) noted ..."that rare quality of being a nice car to be in at any speed, from stationary to maximum." The touring range based on the SM's fuel economy and the large 90 L (20 imp gal; 24 US gal) fuel tank made long, fast, relaxing journeys possible.

Because the SM had a smaller 170 PS (125 kW) engine than competitors, the acceleration was adequate rather than exemplary – some competitors were quicker. Some owners have fitted the similar sized 220 PS (162 kW) Maserati Merak SS engine, which does improve the driving experience considerably. The fuel consumption compared favorably to its competitors.

Performance against competitors
Make & model	Power 'SAE net'	Top speed	Acceleration 0 to 60 mph (0–97 km/h)	Fuel economy
Citroën SM	170 PS (125 kW)	220 km/h (137 mph)	8.5 sec	12.5 L/100 km (22.6 mpg_{‑imp}; 18.8 mpg_{‑US})
Jensen Interceptor	254 PS (187 kW)	217 km/h (135 mph)	7.5 sec	24 L/100 km (12 mpg_{‑imp}; 9.8 mpg_{‑US})
Alfa Romeo Montreal	171 kW (229 hp)	224 km/h (139 mph)	7.5 sec	13.7 L/100 km (20.6 mpg_{‑imp}; 17.2 mpg_{‑US})
BMW 3.0CS	193 PS (142 kW)	200 km/h (124 mph)	7.9 sec	15.5 L/100 km (18.2 mpg_{‑imp}; 15.2 mpg_{‑US})
Mercedes-Benz 450 SLC	192 PS (141 kW)	202 km/h (126 mph)	9.5 sec	15 L/100 km (19 mpg_{‑imp}; 16 mpg_{‑US})
Jaguar XKE Series III V12	254 PS (187 kW)	217 km/h (135 mph)	6.8 sec	18 L/100 km (16 mpg_{‑imp}; 13 mpg_{‑US})
Continental Mark IV	215 PS (158 kW)	190 km/h (118 mph)	10.8 sec	25.3 L/100 km (11.2 mpg_{‑imp}; 9.3 mpg_{‑US})
Cadillac Eldorado	238 PS (175 kW)	189 km/h (117 mph)	9.7 sec	26.2 L/100 km (10.8 mpg_{‑imp}; 9.0 mpg_{‑US})

== Technical innovations ==
The SM combined many unusual and innovative features, some of which were only becoming commonplace on cars manufactured many decades later. It borrowed heavily from the innovations introduced on the DS, by including hydro-pneumatic (oleo pneumatic) self-leveling suspension, and self-leveling lights that swiveled with the steering (except in the United States, where these were illegal at the time).

The SM was Citroën's means of demonstrating just how much power and performance could be accommodated in a front-wheel drive design. This was novel, and many technical issues needed to be overcome, especially related to torque steer, where excessive steering feedback affects control of the vehicle.

A solution was found – no road feedback at all – the driver points and goes, regardless of what the driven wheels are experiencing. Hitting a pothole at high speed would not turn the steering wheel in the driver's hands.

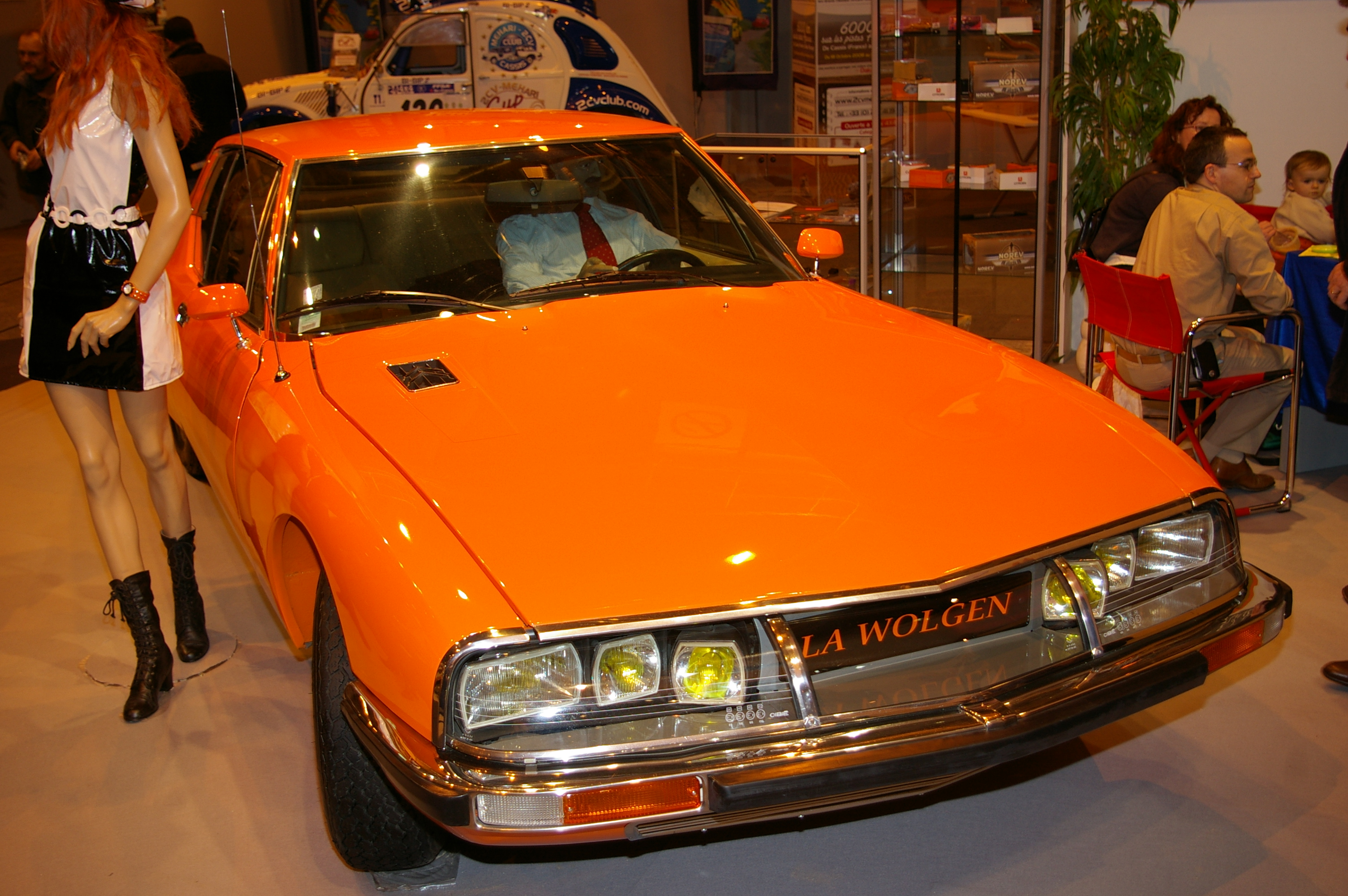
Headlights turn with front wheels, to see around corners

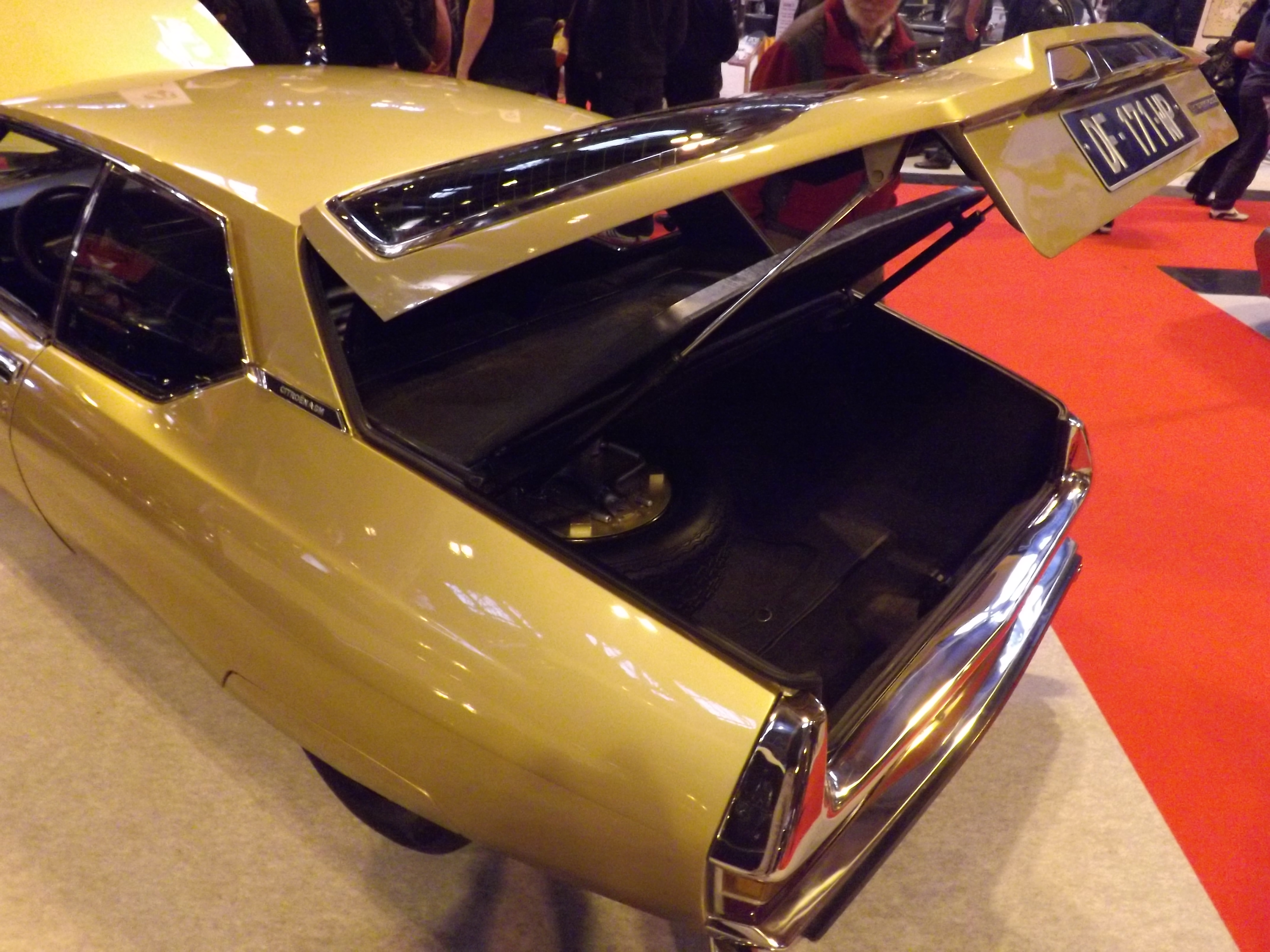
Tailgate open

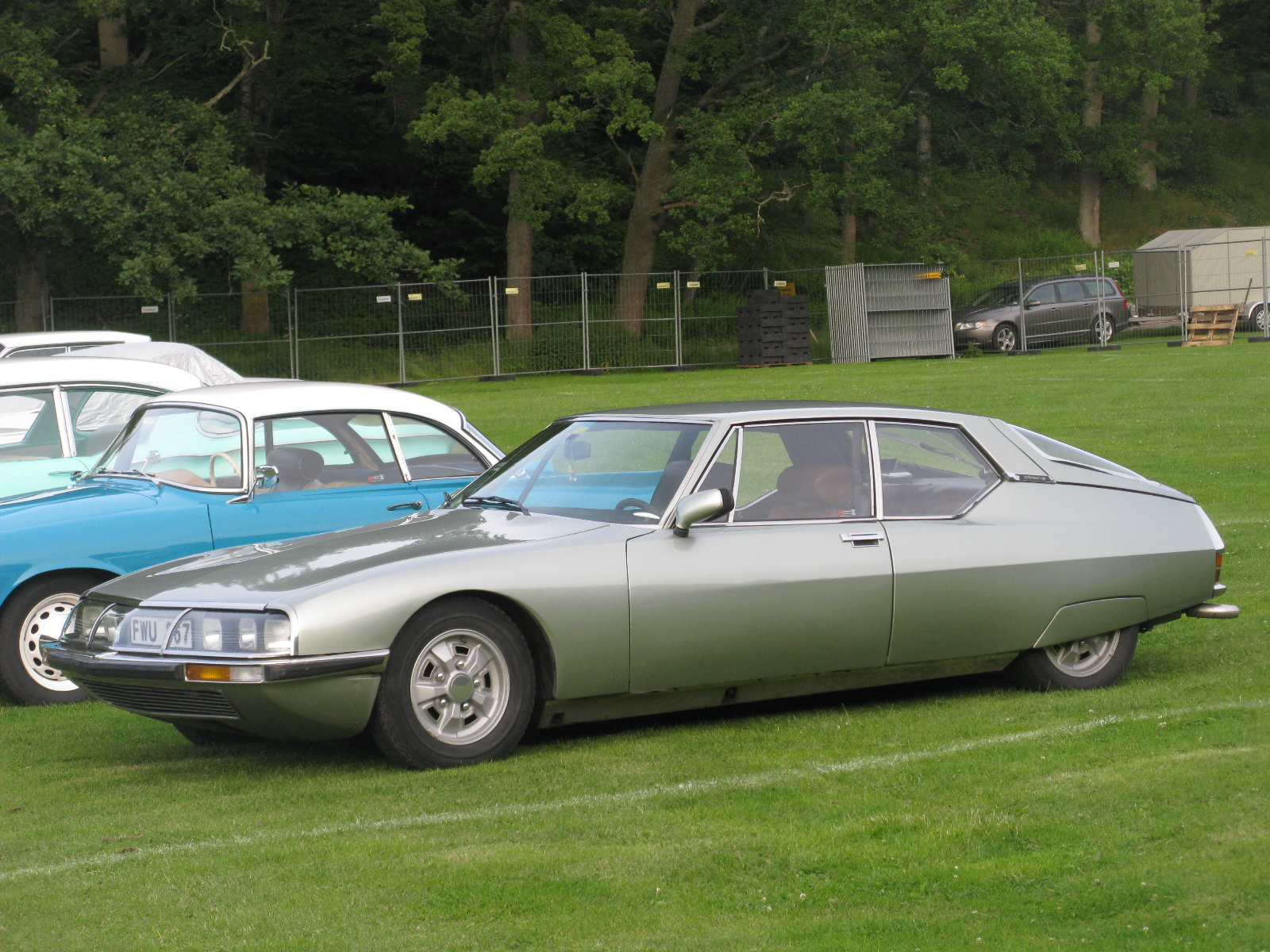
Fiberglass wheels option

This new type of variable assist power steering was later fitted to the Citroën CX in large numbers and its basic principle has since spread throughout the vehicle production. DIRAVI as it was called, allowed great assistance to the motorist while parking, but little assistance at motorway speeds. The system adjusts the hydraulic pressure on the steering centering cam according to vehicle speed so that the amount of steering feel remained almost constant at any speed, counteracting the tendency of manual and ordinary power assisted steering to feel light at high speed. Thus the car turns easily at low speed, emphasized by high gearing given two turns lock-lock, and relatively more effort is required at higher speed.

If the driver released the steering wheel, then the steering would center back to the straight ahead position. It was geared for minimal steering input – with two turns from lock to lock, it is often described as go kart-like.

Many contemporary reviewers remarked that this system would take at least 80 km (50 mi) of driving to become familiar, but once the driver is accustomed to the system, then traditional steering feels old-fashioned.

This steering was controversial at the time – the exaggerated, strong-arm steering inputs required in contemporary cars could cause abrupt manoeuvres in the SM. When the SM was cast as a TV series regular on The Protectors (1972), the lead actress refused to drive it, because of the familiarization required from the steering.

The DIRAVI steering is self-centering and fully powered (as opposed to hydraulically assisted). This feature allows the front wheels to run near-zero caster, and means that there is no camber change as lock is applied, and also ensures that the maximum amount of tyre area is in contact with the road at all times.

The wiper mechanism, when on the "low speed" setting, is 'sensitive' to rain, by measuring the current needed to drive the wiper motor, while the steering column is adjustable in both height and reach.

The braking system, adapted from the DS, employs disc brakes at all four corners (the DS has drums at the rear), with the front brakes being inboard, and cooled via large ducts on the front underside of the car. The hydraulic braking pressure front to rear balance is self-adjusting according to the weight in the rear of the car, so on hard braking the entire car lowers evenly.

Standard wheels are steel with stainless trims, but for the rigors of off-road racing, Michelin developed a unique solution – a lightweight fiberglass wheel, which became a factory fitted option. These plastic wheels weigh less than half the standard weight and were decades in advance of similar applications. Hemmings and others are wrong when mentioning Michelin's "Roues Resin" as carbon fiber wheels, the wheels contain glass fibers, not carbon fibers. This is very clear when seeing the backside of the rims. Jalopnik also wrongly states that the wheels are made with carbon fibers.

== Styling ==
Designed in-house by Citroën's chief designer Robert Opron, the SM bears a family resemblance to the Citroën CX and Citroën GS, and to some extent the Maserati Mistral. Like the CX, the SM retains the rear fender skirts, and seen from above, the SM resembles a teardrop, with a wide front track tapering to a narrower rear track.

The SM was unusually aerodynamic for its era, with a Kamm tail and low drag coefficient. At launch, Citroën claimed a drag coefficient of 0.26, although it later published a revised figure of 0.339. The ventilation intake is located in a "neutral" area on the hood, which makes the ventilator fan regulate the interior ventilation at all road speeds.

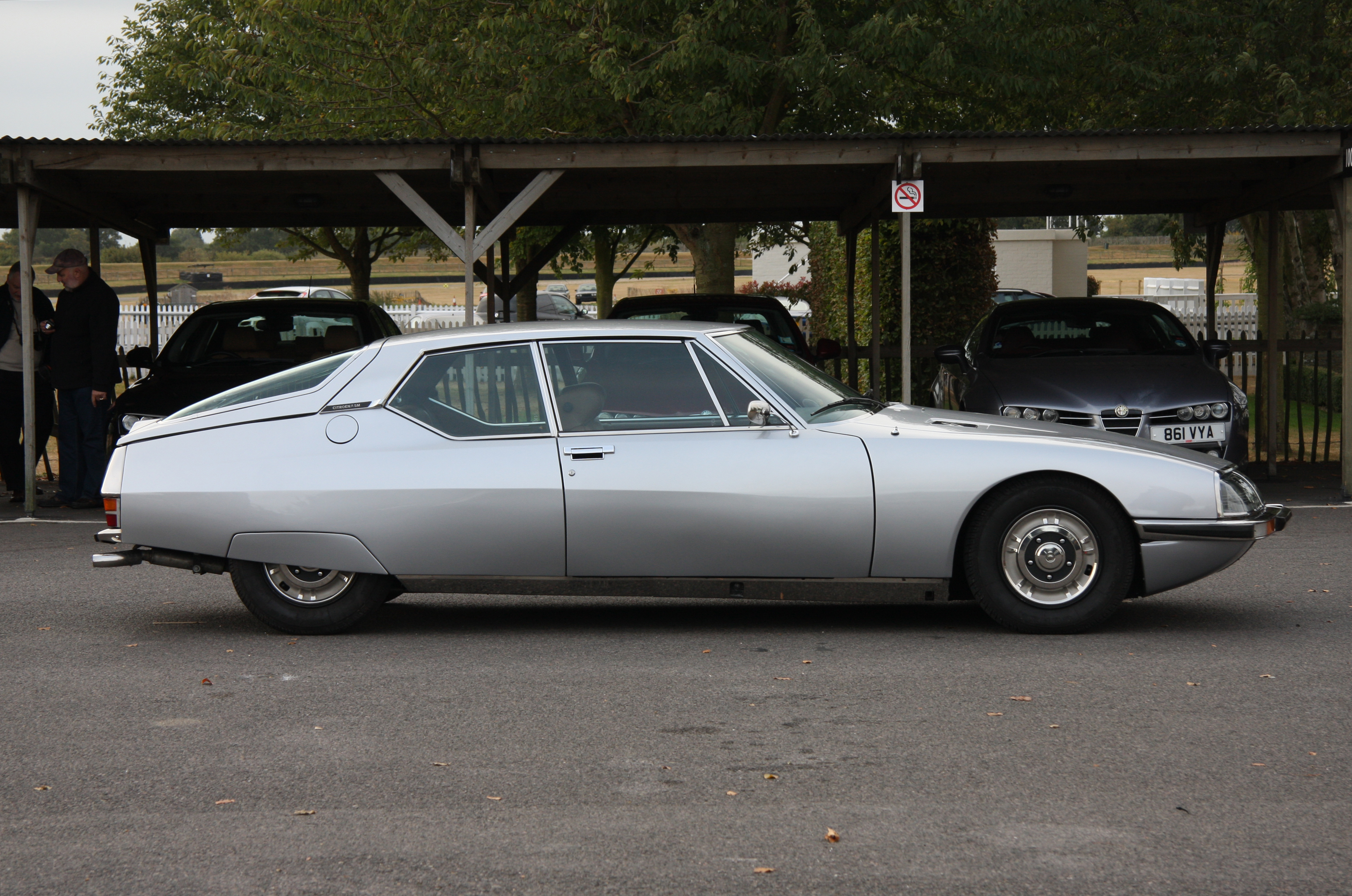
The SM in profile

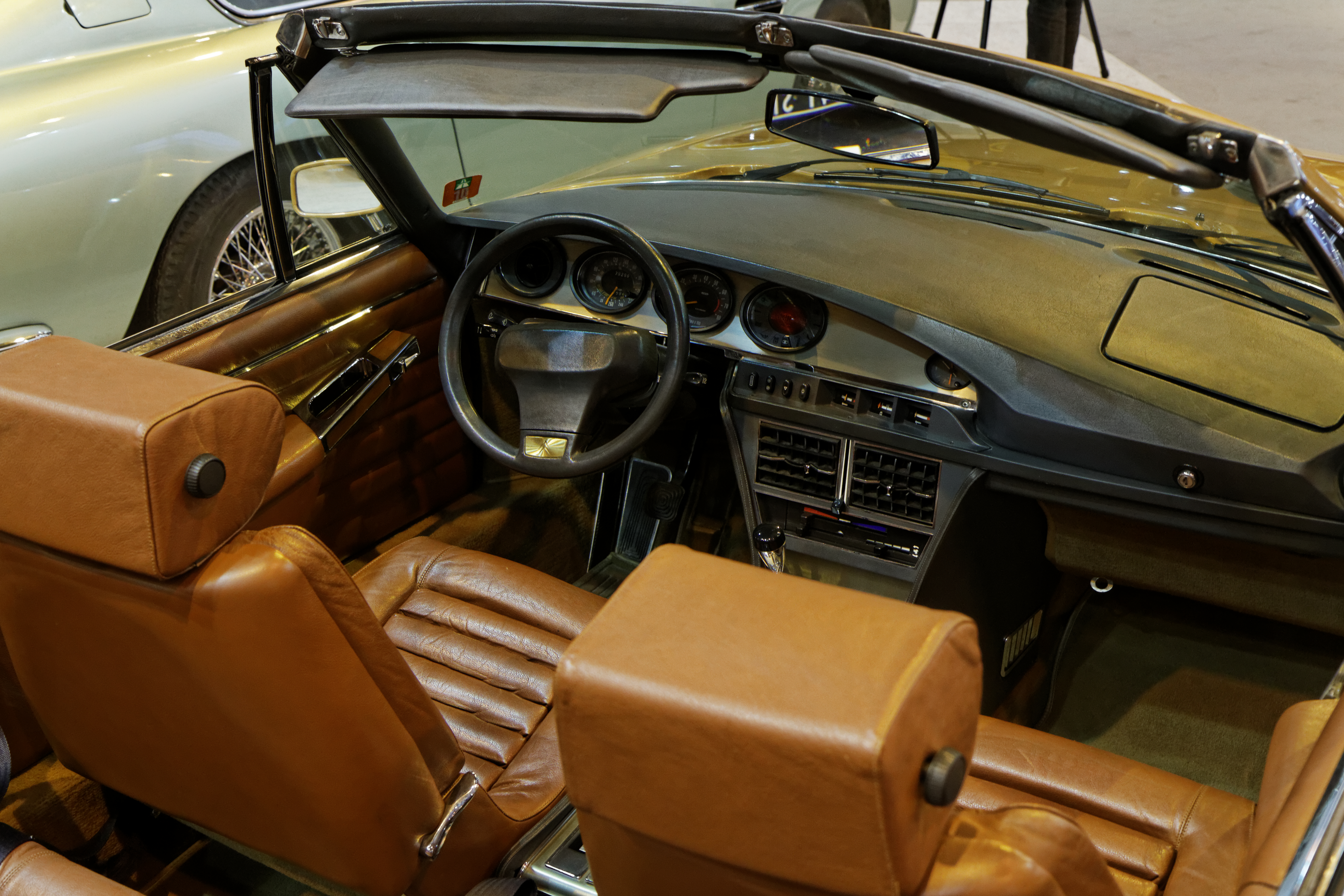
The SM interior

With its distinctly modernist influence, the interior styling of the SM is as dramatic as the exterior. The small oval steering wheel is matched by oval gauges. The manual shift lever 'boot' is a highly stylized chrome gate. The seats are highly adjustable buckets with centre padding composed of many individual 'rolls'. High-quality materials are used throughout. The bonnet is aircraft grade aluminum, while the external bright work is stainless steel, rather than 'cheaper' chrome (except for "plastichrome" "SM" trim at the rear base of the rain gutter).

In 1970, it was the fastest front-wheel-drive car, with a factory-quoted top speed of 220 km/h (137 mph), and independent tests achieving as much as 235 km/h (146 mph). It was an example of the car as a symbol of optimism and progressive technology, similar to the SM's contemporary, the Concorde aircraft.

The SM's design placed eleventh on Automobile Magazine's 2005 "100 Coolest Cars" listing.

== US exports ==
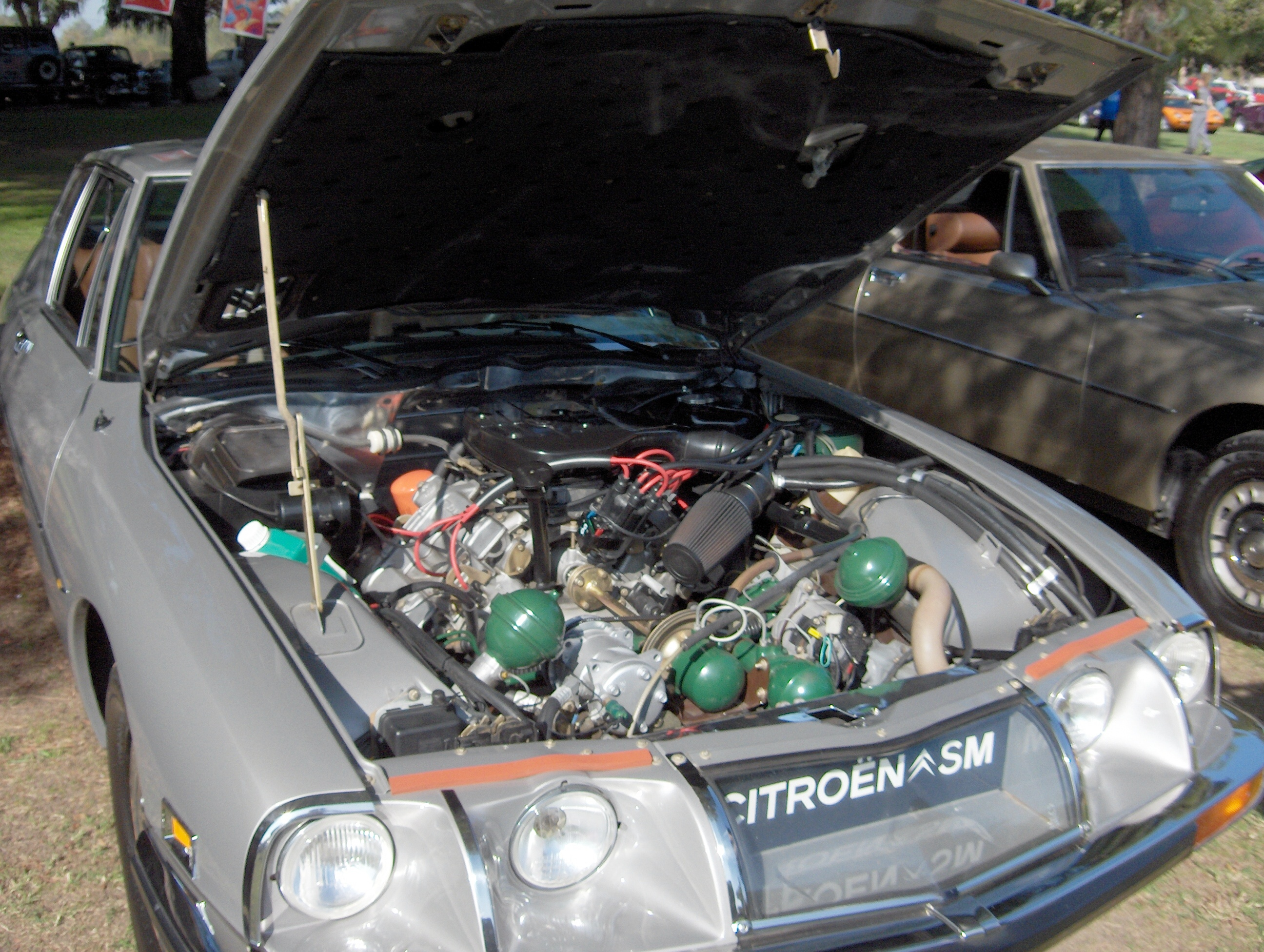
A US-spec Citroën SM with round headlamps. The green spheres are part of the hydropneumatic suspension system.

The main export market for the SM was the US, where the market for personal luxury cars was much larger than in Europe. Competitors included the Cadillac Eldorado, Lincoln Mark IV and Ford Thunderbird alongside Italian, British, and German imports. The unique design of the SM made quite a splash and won the Motor Trend magazine's Car of the Year award in 1972, unheard of for a non-US vehicle at the time.

The SM's system of six replaceable-bulb composite halogen headlamps with swivelling high beams was illegal in the US, where regulations at the time required all vehicles to have two or four round sealed-beam headlamps on fixed mounts and with no lens or other covering in front of them. SMs for the US market were fitted with four exposed round non-swivelling sealed beams.

Despite initial success, US sales ceased suddenly when Citroën did not receive an expected exemption for the 1974 model year 5 mph (8.0 km/h) bumper regulation imposed by the NHTSA. The integral variable height suspension of the SM made compliance impossible. The 1974 SMs built for the US market (134 cars), could not be supplied to Americans due to the effective date of the bumper regulation, so were sold in Japan instead.

== Engines ==
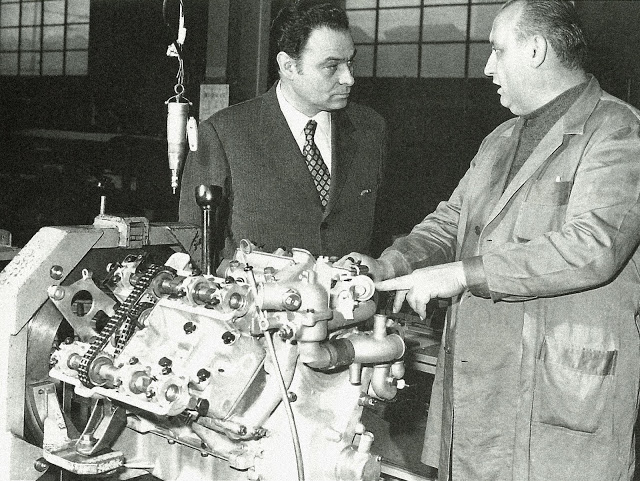
Giulio Alfieri and SM engine in May 1969

The SM was sold with a small, lightweight engine in various forms, designed from scratch by Giulio Alfieri but capable of being assembled on the existing tooling for the Maserati V8 engine. Because of this, the engine sported an unusual 90° angle between cylinder banks – a trait shared with the later PRV V6. It was a very compact and innovative design that allowed the use of just one pattern for the cylinder heads and an intermediate shaft extended out to drive the auxiliaries.

The engine was aluminum, weighing just 140 kg (309 lb), and was always mounted behind the front axle.

Model	Serial number	Engine	Displacement cc	Fuel supply	Power (DIN)	Transmission/ N° gears	Weight	Top Speed	Years of production	Number produced
SM 2.7	type SB	C114-1	2,670	3 Weber carburetors 42DCNF	170 PS (125 kW; 168 hp)	M/5	1,450 kg (3,197 lb)	220 km/h (137 mph)	1970–72	7.133
SM 2.7 Automatique	type SB	C114-1	2,670	3 Weber carburetors 42DCNF	170 PS (125 kW; 168 hp)	A/3	1,480 kg (3,263 lb)	205 km/h (127 mph)	1972	675
SM 2.7 Injection	type SC	C114-3	2,670	Electronic Injection; Bosch D-Jetronic	178 PS (131 kW; 176 hp)	M/5	1,490 kg (3,285 lb)	228 km/h (142 mph)	1972–75	3.500
SM 3.0	type SD	C114-11	2,965	3 Weber carburetors 42DCNF	180 PS (132 kW; 178 hp)	M/5	1,450 kg (3,197 lb)	225 km/h (140 mph)	1973	600
SM 3.0 Automatique	type SD	C114-11	2,965	3 Weber carburetors 42DCNF	180 PS (132 kW; 178 hp)	A/3	1,480 kg (3,263 lb)	205 km/h (127 mph)	1973–75	1.012

The size of the 2.7 L engine was limited by French puissance fiscale taxation, which made large displacement vehicles too expensive to sell in any quantity in France.

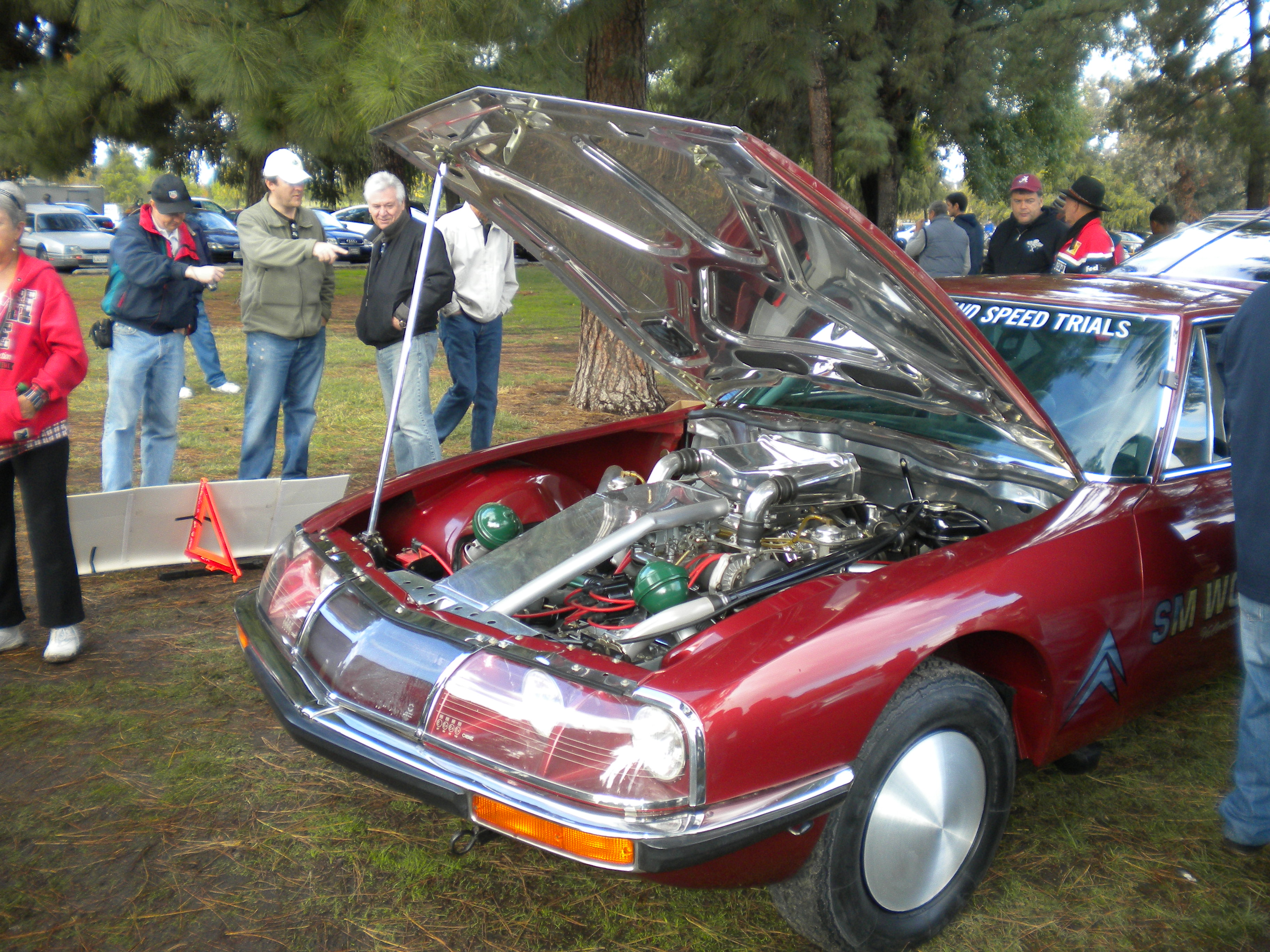
Twin Turbo V6 SM developed by SM World in Los Angeles, California – achieved 325 km/h (202 mph) at Bonneville Salt Flats

One SM had a Maserati V8 motor – this was a heavily used test bed developed by Maserati for the 1974 Maserati Quattroporte II. Despite developing 190 kW (260 hp), the car required relatively modest adjustments, and the performance made the SM into a true sporting car.

One SM had a V6 twin Turbo – developed by specialist Jerry Hathaway (SM World) for land speed record testing at Bonneville Salt Flats – achieving 325 km/h (202 mph).

Smooth shifting 5-speed manual transmissions were fitted to most SMs. A 3-speed Borg Warner fully automatic transmission was an option in North America in 1972–73, and in Europe 1974–75.

The engine was also used in the Maserati Merak from 1972 to 1982. Later versions of the Merak SS had much larger valves and developed 160 kW (220 hp). The Ligier JS2 sports car also used this V6 engine. The final SMs were produced in the Ligier factory in Vichy.

Under new ownership, Maserati developed the 1981 Biturbo model, by applying turbocharging to this engine, and sold 40,000 units.

== Motorsport ==
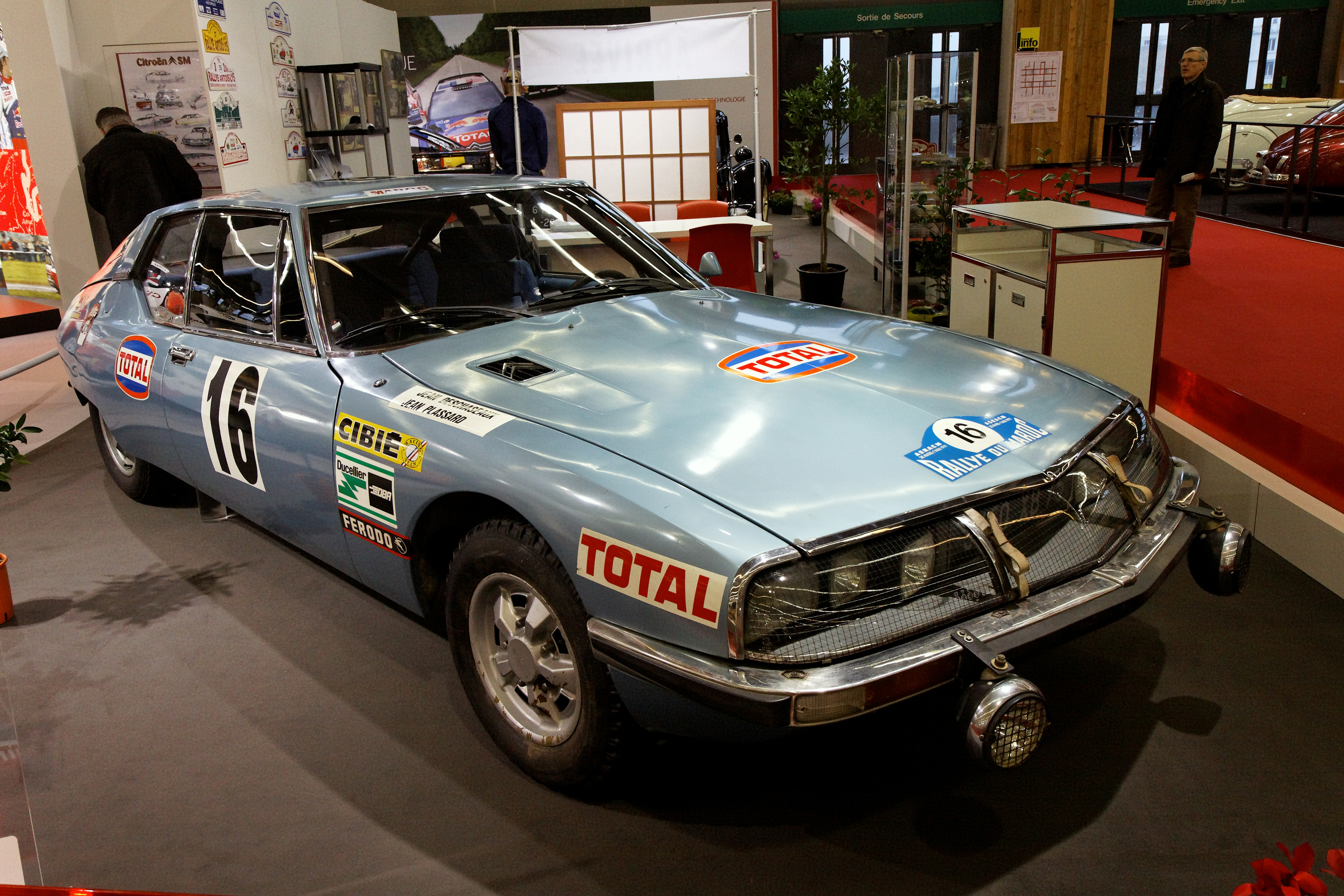
Citroën SM that raced in the 1971 Rallye du Maroc

The SM won its first competitive outing, the gruelling 1971 Rallye du Maroc. Citroën continued rallying the SM, eventually developing a "breadvan" short-wheelbase racing variant.

SM World, a marque specialist in Los Angeles, California, produced a turbocharged SM, which in 1987 set the land speed record for production vehicles in its class at the Bonneville Salt Flats, Utah – traveling 325 km/h (202 mph).

== Demise ==
After the 1974 bankruptcy of Citroën, Peugeot took ownership of the company and, in May 1975, divested from Maserati. Peugeot quickly decided to stop building the SM, as production had dropped to 294 cars in 1974 and 115 units the final year.

Observers often attribute the demise of the SM to the 1973 oil crisis and economic recession.

While the oil shock certainly affected sales, many far more profligate cars were introduced at the same time the SM ceased production, including the hydropneumatically suspended Mercedes-Benz 450SEL 6.9. Peugeot even introduced a V6 powered car of similar displacement and fuel consumption in 1975, the 604. In the US (the main export market for the SM), the SM was actually an economical vehicle relative to its competitors. However, the US National Highway Traffic Safety Administration (NHTSA) imposed new automotive design regulations in 1974, effectively banning the Citroën from the US market.

As illustrated under production numbers, SM sales declined starting in 1972. This appears to be attributable to maintenance issues. Like an exotic Italian car, the Weber carburetors require frequent adjustment. Many engines experienced failure at 60,000 kilometres (37,000 mi) – it was unclear to most owners that the interference engine design has timing chains that require manual adjustment, an issue not corrected until long after production ceased. The 90° engine timing was unfamiliar to mechanics in the 1970s. Only Buick (1962–66; 1975–) and Jeep (1966–71) used a V6 with 90° between banks of cylinders. Another issue that has been resolved with retrofit is the unreliable ignition breaker cassettes.

Most vehicles require only generalist maintenance, where any competent mechanic can properly maintain the vehicle. Certain vehicles – like Citroëns and Ferraris – require specialist care due to their unique design. While a sturdy car if maintained rigorously, an SM requires two sets of specialist care – Citroën specialists, which are widespread in Europe, and a rarer Maserati specialist, to keep the engine in tune. Once potential buyers began to realize this, sales dropped precipitously.

The Quai André-Citroën factory on the banks of the Seine River in Paris closed in 1974, necessitating new manufacturing facilities for both the DS and the SM. The runout DS models were built at the new Aulnay-sous-Bois factory, while the final 135 examples of the SM were built by Ligier.

Components of the SM lived on, albeit mirror imaged – in the Maserati Merak (engine, transmission) and the Lotus Esprit (transmission). The successful Citroën CX carried forward most of the SM's dynamic qualities, including the trendsetting speed sensitive power steering.

== Production numbers ==
A total of 12,920 SMs were produced during its lifetime. Sales declined steeply each year following the first full year of production. The North American market took 2,400 cars in 1972 and 1973.

Year	Europe/Asia/Middle East/Africa	Sales Change	US and Canada	>>TOTAL>>
1970	868	–	0	868
1971	4,988	475%	0	4,988
1972	2,786	(44%)	1,250	4,036
1973	1,469	(47%)	1,150	2,619
1974	294	(80%)	0	294
1975	115	(61%)	0	115

== Variants ==
The factory produced just a single body style – a LHD two-door fastback fixed head coupé, but the design did inspire a variety of derivatives, none produced in any quantity.

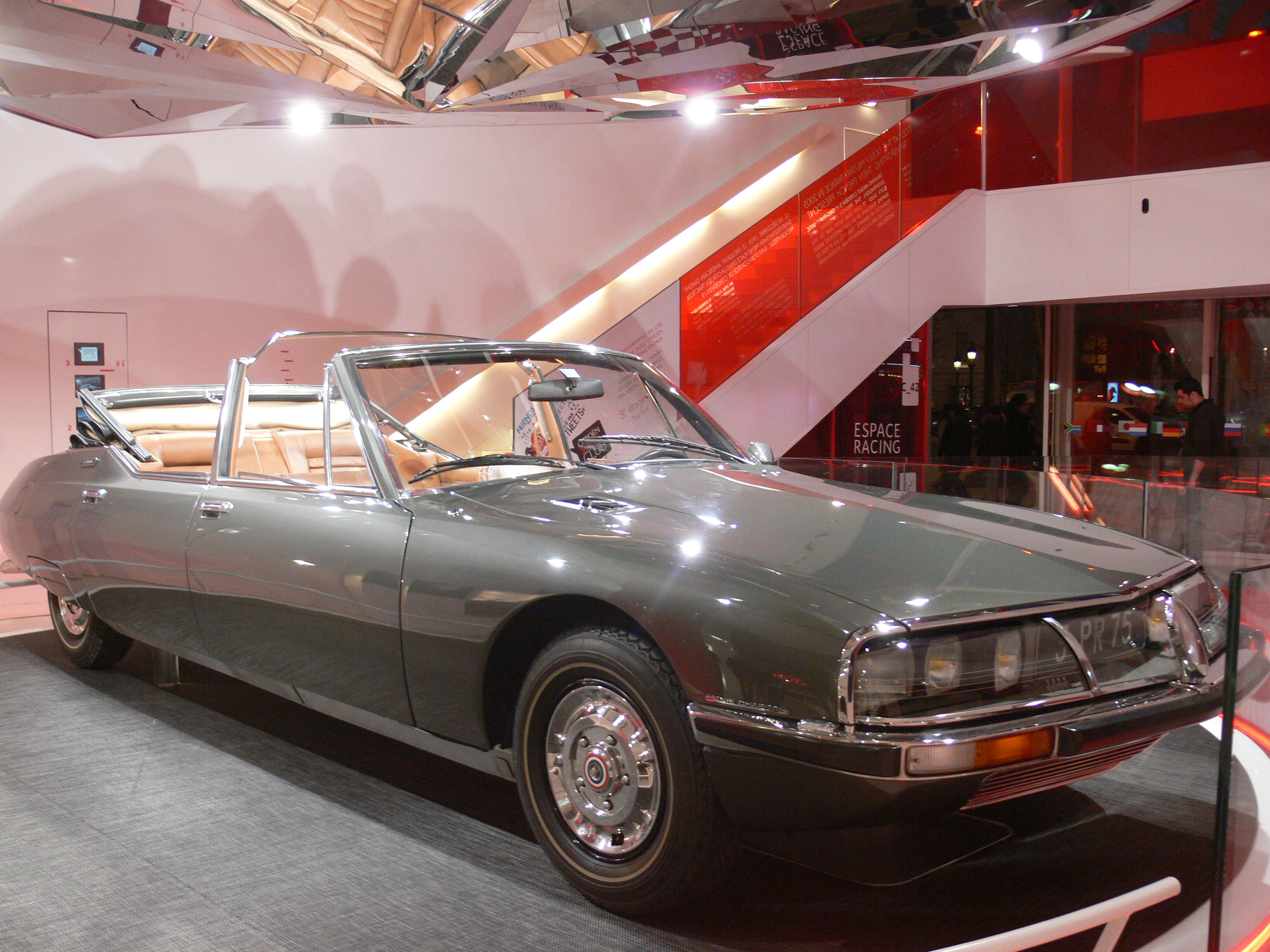
1972 Citroën SM présidentielle

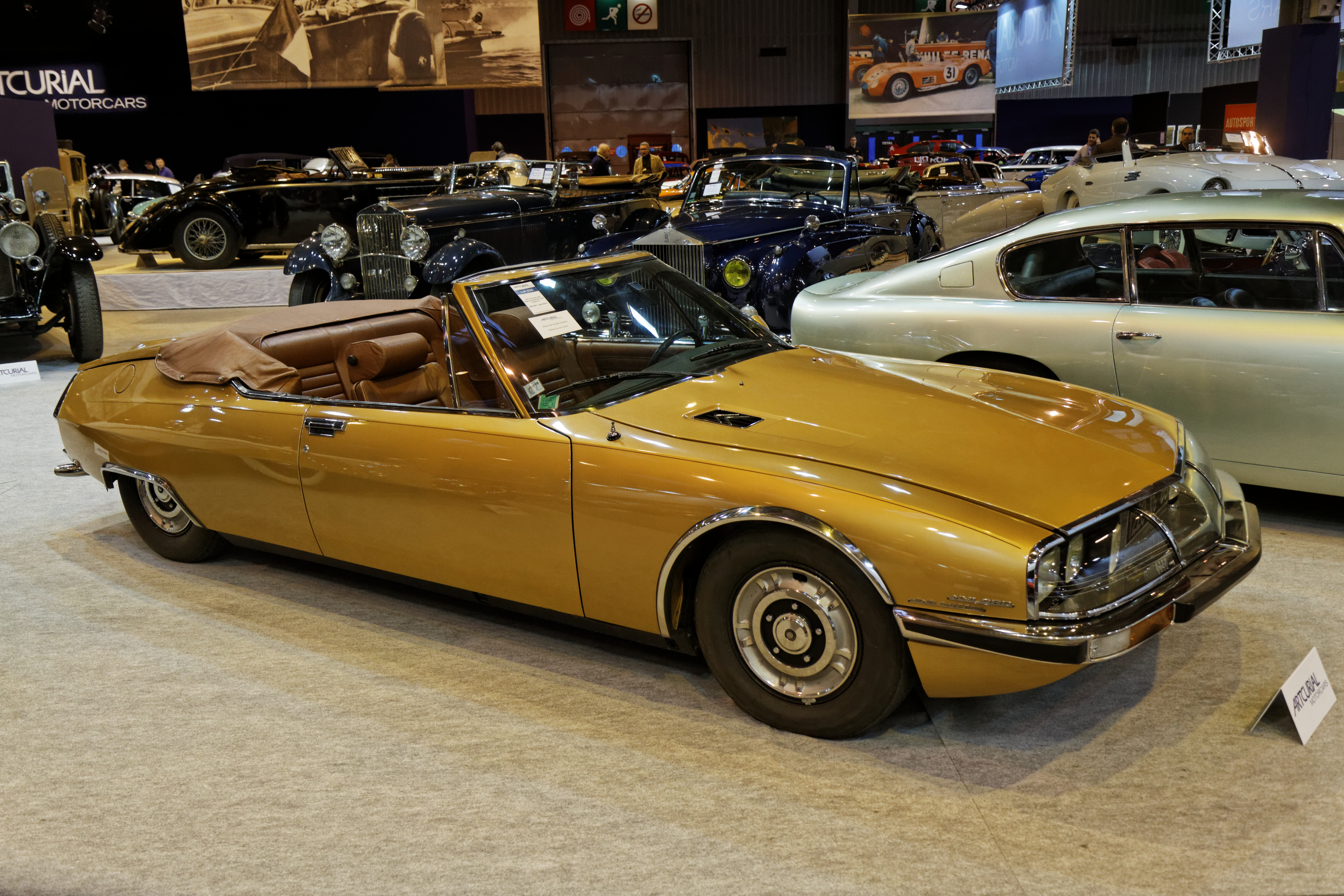
1975 Citroën SM Mylord – sold at auction in 2014 for €548,320 (US$754,220)

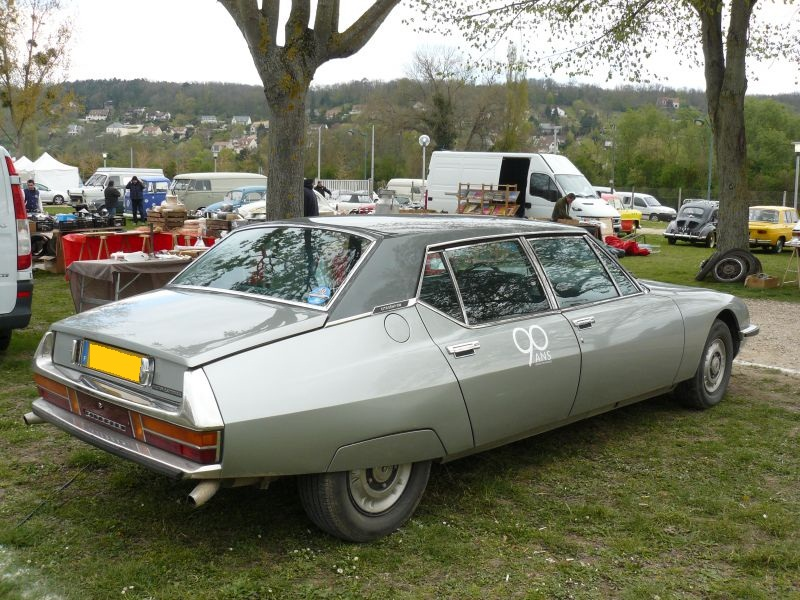
1974 Citroën SM Opéra

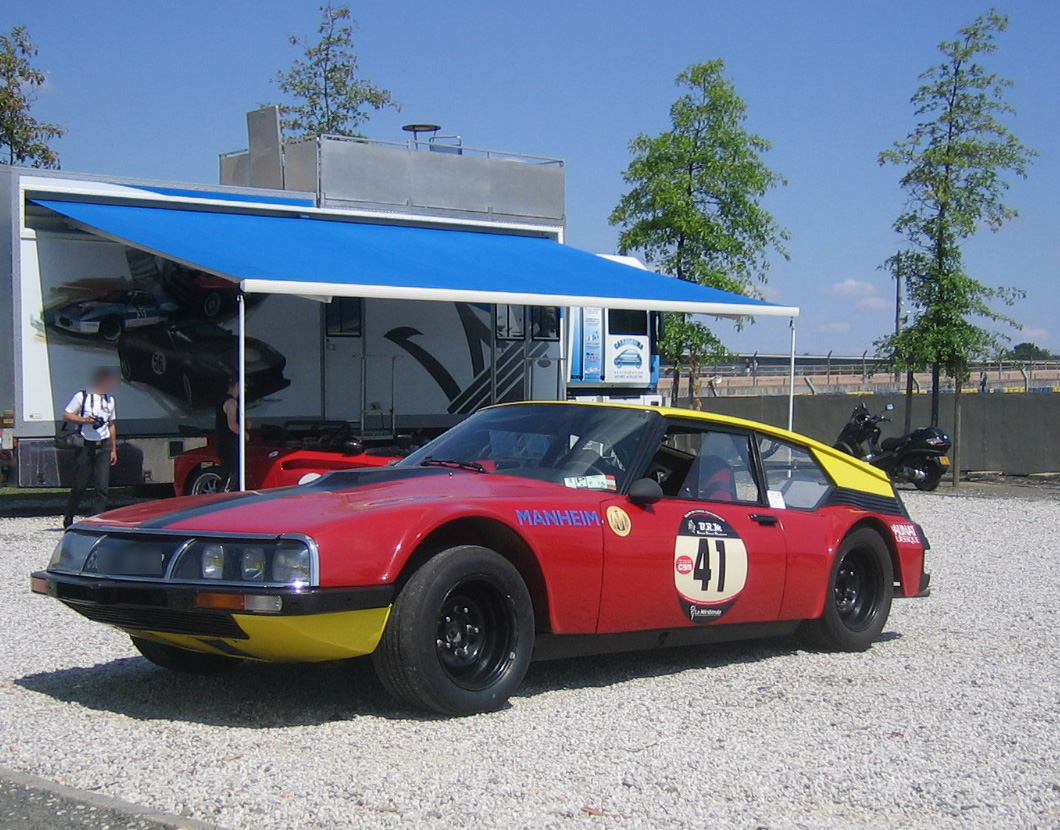
"Breadvan", short-wheelbase racing variant

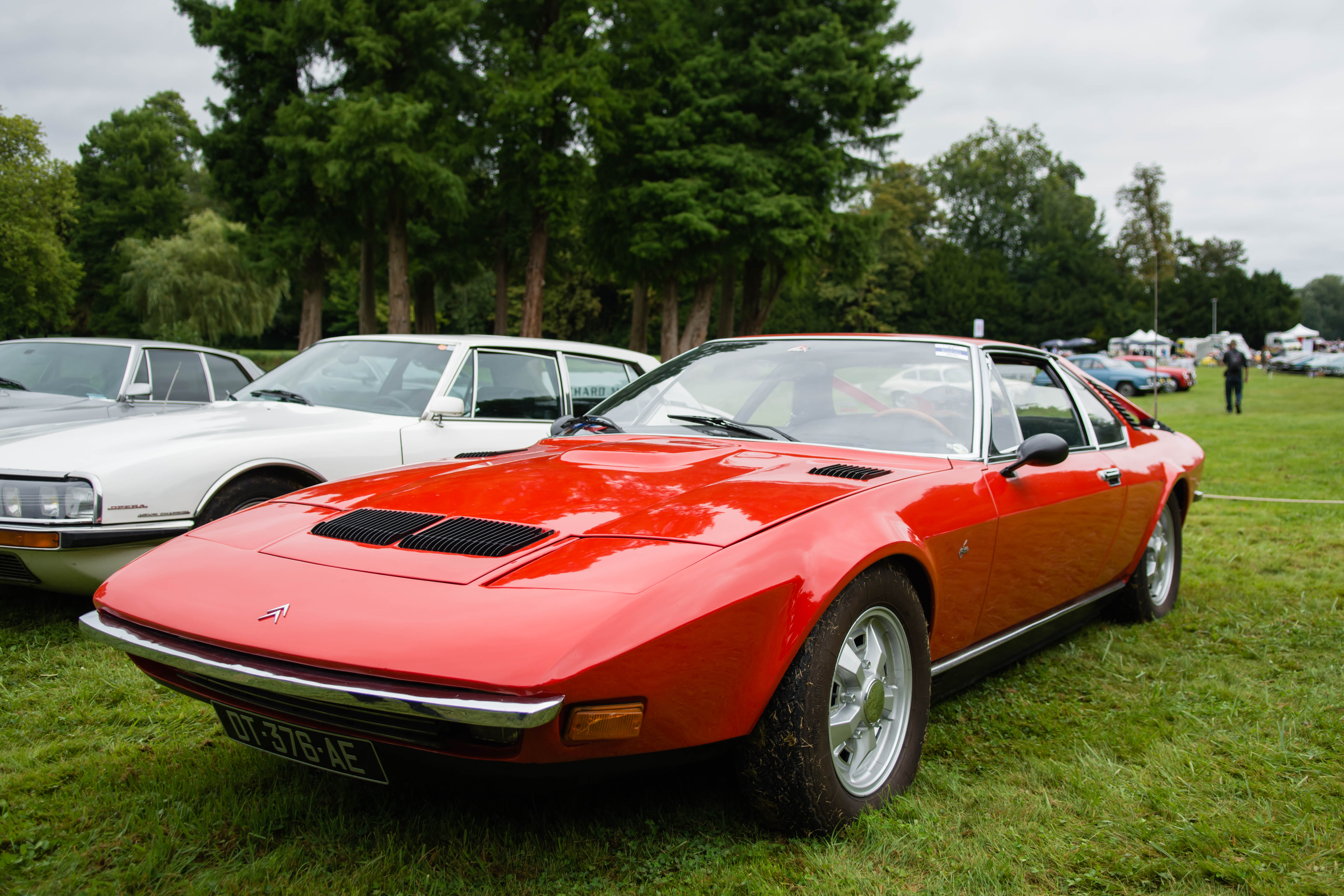
1972 Citroën SM Frua concept

Coachbuilder Henri Chapron from Levallois-Perret produced several very collectible variants of the SM.

French Presidents from Georges Pompidou to Jacques Chirac enjoyed touring Paris in the two 4-door convertible Citroën SM présidentielle models, sharing them with such notables as Pope John Paul II and visiting heads of state. The inaugural drive for this version was a month after completion, by Pompidou and Queen Elizabeth II in May 1972. Built by Chapron to a design by Citroën, the chassis was stretched by 52 cm (20.5 in) to an overall length of 5.60 m (220.5 in). These manual transmission cars have special low gearing and additional cooling suitable for parade use, allowing them to travel at a speed of 6–7 km/h (3.7–4.3 mph). They also feature a small, rearward-facing dropdown seat for the use of a translator or secretary, and an electrically powered top with hydraulic actuators. The SM présidentielles served for 37 years and were retired with around 25,000 km (16,000 mi) on their odometers.

Chapron also created five convertibles (SM Mylord) and seven sedans (SM Opéra). Original examples of these rare models are very valuable – the last MyLord sale recorded was for €548,320 in February 2014. Some SM owners have made their own copies of the SM convertible in particular. Unlike the DS, the factory never authorized a convertible model, as Citroën felt the roof was integral to the structure of the SM. On the SM, the roof and rear quarter panels were welded on.

In 1971, Heuliez produced two examples of pillarless targa top convertible, the SM Espace. Unlike the factory SM, the rear quarter windows could retract into the bodywork.

Just before the SM's demise, Citroën produced several short-wheelbase racing versions with squared-off rear sections and highly tuned engines – known as the "breadvan" model.

In the UK, three official RHD prototypes were constructed by Middleton Motors, a Citroën dealer in Hertfordshire, England. At least one of these prototypes still survives.

In Australia, 12 cars were converted to RHD by Chappel Engineering in Melbourne, Australia for Dutton's (the Australian importer of Citroën at the time). Cars are still being modified with RHD controls and dashboards for the Australian market, where RHD is mandatory.

In the US, 100 cars were fitted with an electric sliding steel sunroof built by ASC.

Frua also proposed a concept car based on the SM, a front-wheel-drive car that closely resembled the mid-engine Maserati Merak.

In the spring of 1974, Maserati created a special 194 kW (260 hp) 4.0 L V8 engine based on the latest C114-11 engine variant. This engine, installed in a standard SM, tested over 12,000 kilometers. The engine was then removed and preserved, while the rest of the car was destroyed by Alejandro de Tomaso. The SM Club of France created an exact replica of this car using the actual engine from the original and displayed it at the Rétromobile 2010 show.

Unfortunately, the intended recipient never received this V8. The Maserati Quattroporte II was a Maserati-badged, four-door variant of the SM with an angular body and lengthened floorpan. The six headlights were retained and the later 'SS' version of the engine fitted. This model was introduced at the time of Citroën's bankruptcy in 1974. It entered production in 1976 and only twelve were produced between then and 1978.

== Prominent owners ==
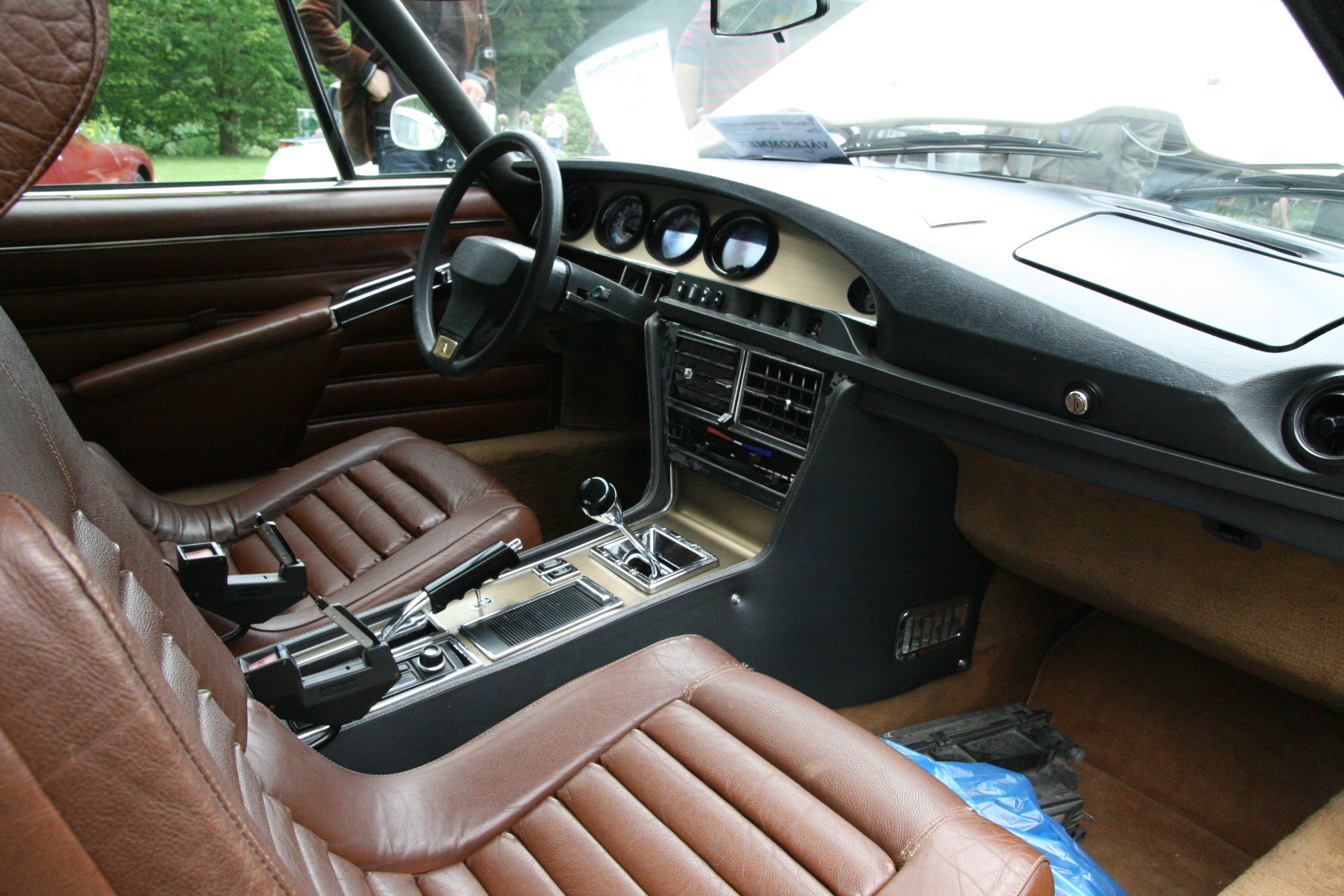
The dramatic dashboard was shared with the Maserati Merak

Like the Citroën DS, the SM has had many celebrity owners. General Secretary of the Communist Party of the USSR Leonid Brezhnev, Rolling Stones bassist Bill Wyman, Adam Clayton of the rock group U2, and Emperor Haile Selassie I of Ethiopia each drove SMs, while Ugandan dictator Idi Amin had seven of them. The Shah of Iran drove an SM.

Actors Lorne Greene and Lee Majors, composer John Williams, author Graham Greene, and former Mauritian QC and Politician Sir Gaetan Duval (1930–1996), football player Johan Cruijff, Rolling Stones drummer Charlie Watts, Cheech & Chong's Cheech Marin and Thomas Chong, motorcycle racer Mike Hailwood, composer John Barry, and musician Carlos Santana, all owned SMs as well. Yugoslav and Croatian singer Mišo Kovač had his very own golden SM.

As of 2019, Guy Berryman of Coldplay was driving an SM. Television host and comedian Jay Leno's SM is seen frequently in the background of his Jay Leno's Garage YouTube videos.
