= DIRAVI =

Proprietary power steering system by Citroën

DIRAVI is the name given by Citroën to its proprietary power steering system, first seen in 1970.

== Name ==
DIRAVI is an acronym for "Direction à rappel asservi" translated directly from French as "steering with controlled return", though more descriptively described in English as "power steering with power assisted return". In the UK, it was marketed as VariPower and in the U.S. as SpeedFeel.

== Purpose ==
DIRAVI was the first commercially available variable assist power steering arrangement, allowing the motorist power assist when parking, but accounting for less steering assistance being needed at high speed. Variable assist power steering has recently been implemented in more mainstream vehicles, using electrical motors rather than hydraulic actuation.

Citroën engineer Paul Magès invented the system as part of its effort to engineer a practical high power, front-wheel drive car - a new type of vehicle at the time.

The DIRAVI system is an addition to the integrated Citroën hydropneumatic suspension and braking system, with all of them drawing power from an engine-driven pump and hydraulic accumulator.

This steering system is fitted to the Citroën SM, the Citroën CX (most), the Citroën XM (most V6 PRVs, and left-hand drive only), the Maserati Quattroporte II, and the Maserati Khamsin.

== Functionality ==
The steering wheel is connected to the hydraulic control unit, which contains a slide valve, the control gears and linkage, and the centring piston and cam. The steering rack pinion is connected to the hydraulic control unit through an adjuster, to allow setting of the centre point of the steering. This then drives one of the control gears, the other being driven by the steering wheel. The control linkage consists of two gears coupled with rods through ball-joints. When the gears are turned relative to each other, the rods move the slide valve, allowing fluid in or out of the rack. This moves the rack, which in turn moves its pinion, turning the control gears back to their centre position. Compare this with a conventional power steering system, which relies on the flexing of a strong spring to control the valve.

The steering rack is almost conventional. As with a normal power-assisted steering setup, there is a rack-and-pinion, and a stepped hydraulic ram with a dividing plate (the piston) in the middle. On one side of the plate, the piston area is half the area of the other, giving twice the area for the fluid to work on. Thus, with full system pressure on the small area side of the ram, and half system pressure on the large area side, the ram remains perfectly balanced and centred. This is because the lower pressure is working on a larger surface area. The smaller side of the piston is at constant hydraulic pressure, the other side only varies in pressure. NOTE: The author seems to be describing the DS power steering piston and rod, on which the piston is in the middle of the rod. The SM's steering cylinder has the piston on the end of the rod, which rod's cross-sectional area is half the area of the other side of the piston. Full hydraulic pressure is admitted to the rod side at all times while the pressure on the other side of the piston (its "head") is regulated.

The steering actually had the same "assist" at all speeds — the steering was hydraulically locked against steering movement of the wheels from the road ("feedback") up to the capacity of the unit. The reduction in 'assist' was achieved by a piston/roller pushing on a heart shaped cam geared to the steering shaft (hence the one turn to full lock), which was fed with system pressure so that as its pressure rose with increasing road speed, the steering assistance seemingly reduced and the steering centring effort rose. However, full steering wheel turning was available at all speeds, though considerable force was necessary to turn the steering wheel at high road speed. Enough pressure was admitted to the centring unit to return the wheels to the straight ahead position when the car was not moving. The centering pressure was regulated by a flyweight centrifugal governor driven by the pinion (secondary) shaft of the manual gearbox and by a proportioning valve connected to the fluid pressure in the automatic gearbox, which pressure was proportional to the speed of the output shaft. The pressure increased all the way to 190 km/h (120 mph), and a subsidiary function of this feed was to turn off the air conditioning fans above 50 km/h (31 mph).

When there is no pressure available to operate the ram, the steering wheel will mechanically move the rack directly but with significant play through a split shaft. One side from the steering wheel drives a pin which mates with a slot on the output shaft connected to the rack. The free play in this emergency mechanical system is necessary for the normal play free pressure operated Diravi system to operate its feedback control loop. In practice this heavy and inaccurate manual steering character of Diravi is only required when the hydraulic system has failed, whence emergency system prioritisation firstly sacrifices the steering system. Added NOTE: The mechanical unpowered steering effort is very heavy. Driving the car without power to the steering should be used only to guide the car to a safe place to stop. Attempting to turn the steering wheel without power when the car is not moving may break the steering wheel.

Because the DIRAVI system is much more sensitive than conventional systems, something must be done to prevent the driver over-controlling at high speeds. This is the job of the heart shaped centring cam inside the unit. A pressure-loaded piston with a roller on the end runs against the edge of this cam. This pressure comes from a centrifugal governor proportioning valve driven from the gearbox (on manual gearboxes - on automatic gearboxes the gearbox's internal governor pressure controls the centring pressure). At low speeds, the centring piston pressure is 2.0 MPa (290 psi), to provide a light degree of self centring when parking etc. Proportionally the self-centring pressure rises to a maximum of about 5.5 MPa (800 psi) at 80 km/h (50 mph), at which self-centring forces become a maximum, stiffening the steering but not excessively so.

== Features ==
- Fully hydraulic (no direct mechanical connection between the steering wheel shaft and the steering pinion during normal operation). Specifically it is hydrostatic, and the angle of the steering/road wheels is hydrostatically locked solid by the angle chosen at the steering wheel - just like the hydrostatic ram of a bulldozer: no road disturbance/force can disturb it.
- Power-operated, unlike conventional power-assisted steering systems.
- Rapid self-centering to straight ahead position - whenever the engine is running the steering wheel will return to center, even when parked
- Artificial feel inbuilt - centering force varies in proportion to vehicle speed and/or steering wheel deflection.
- Power for the system from a regulated high-pressure hydraulic pump which also operates the brakes and suspension system.
- The steering is operated by a rack and pinion system which normally only works as a feedback loop.
- The rack takes the form of a double acting hydraulic ram, but is capable of taking over full steering function in the event of a hydraulic failure. During normal operation the rack and pinion merely provides a position indication to the steering control valve through the pinion shaft. The rack and pinion do the actual steering only in the absence of system hydraulic pressure.
- A hydraulic power safety prioritisation valve sets hydraulic fluid availability to each circuit in the Citroën system.
- In a hydraulic system failure, order of loss is first steering, then suspension, then brakes

== Advantages ==
- No steering kickback - blowouts, potholes, ruts, etc. cannot affect the steering wheel or the direction of the steered wheels which can only be moved by steering wheel input, since apparent feedback is entirely artificial and bears no relation to the actual forces on the front wheels from the vehicle's inertia and the roadway.
- Requires minimal physical exertion - In the SM the steering wheel can be turned lock-to-lock with one finger when the car is standing
- Very fast (minor steering inputs cause large front-wheel movements) – 2.0 turns lock-to-lock in SM configuration, 2.5 in the CX
- Can be set up permitting vehicle to travel in a straight line without driver input on a constant-camber road in still conditions.
- la Diravi transforms the experience of steering the long, front-heavy vehicle into child's play, permitting even a small person to steer a big SM precisely, able to respond instantly to sudden surprises

== Disadvantages ==
- No feedback to the driver - apparent feedback is entirely artificial and bears no relation to the actual forces on the front wheels from the vehicle's inertia and the roadway.
- Requires familiarization - novices find DIRAVI too fast and sensitive.
- Cannot allow both hands to leave steering wheel when navigating curves - because of rapid self centering.
- The absence of a firm mechanical linkage between the road wheels and the steering wheel means that any hydraulic-system malfunction could engender a serious loss of vehicle-control accuracy.
