= Veleno =

Veleno may refer to:

== Music ==
- Veleno (Fleshgod Apocalypse album), 2019
- Veleno (Mina album), 2002 album
- Veleno (guitar), a series of aluminum guitars built by John Veleno
- Cor Veleno, an Italian hardcore hip hop music group

== Other uses ==
- Rinspeed Veleno, a modified Dodge Viper built by Rinspeed
- Joe Veleno, a Canadian ice hockey player
- Bocadillo (dessert), a Colombian dessert also known as bocadillo veleño
