= Head-up display =

Transparent display presenting data within normal sight lines of the user

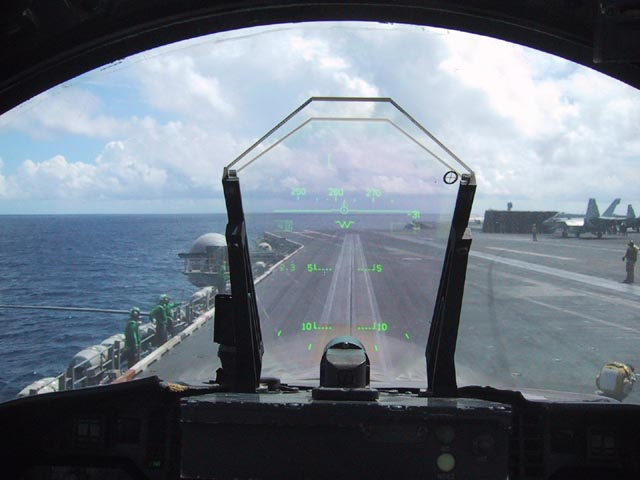
HUD of an F/A-18 Hornet

A head-up display (also called heads-up display in North American English), also known as a HUD (/hʌd/) or head-up guidance system (HGS), is any transparent display that presents data without requiring users to look away from their usual viewpoints. The origin of the name stems from a pilot being able to view information with the head positioned "up" and looking forward, instead of angled down looking at lower instruments. A HUD also has the advantage that the pilot's eyes do not need to refocus to view the outside after looking at the optically nearer instruments.

Although they were initially developed for military aviation, HUDs are now used in commercial aircraft, automobiles, and other (mostly professional) applications.

Head-up displays were a precursor technology to augmented reality (AR), incorporating a subset of the features needed for the full AR experience, but lacking the necessary registration and tracking between the virtual content and the user's real-world environment.

== Overview ==
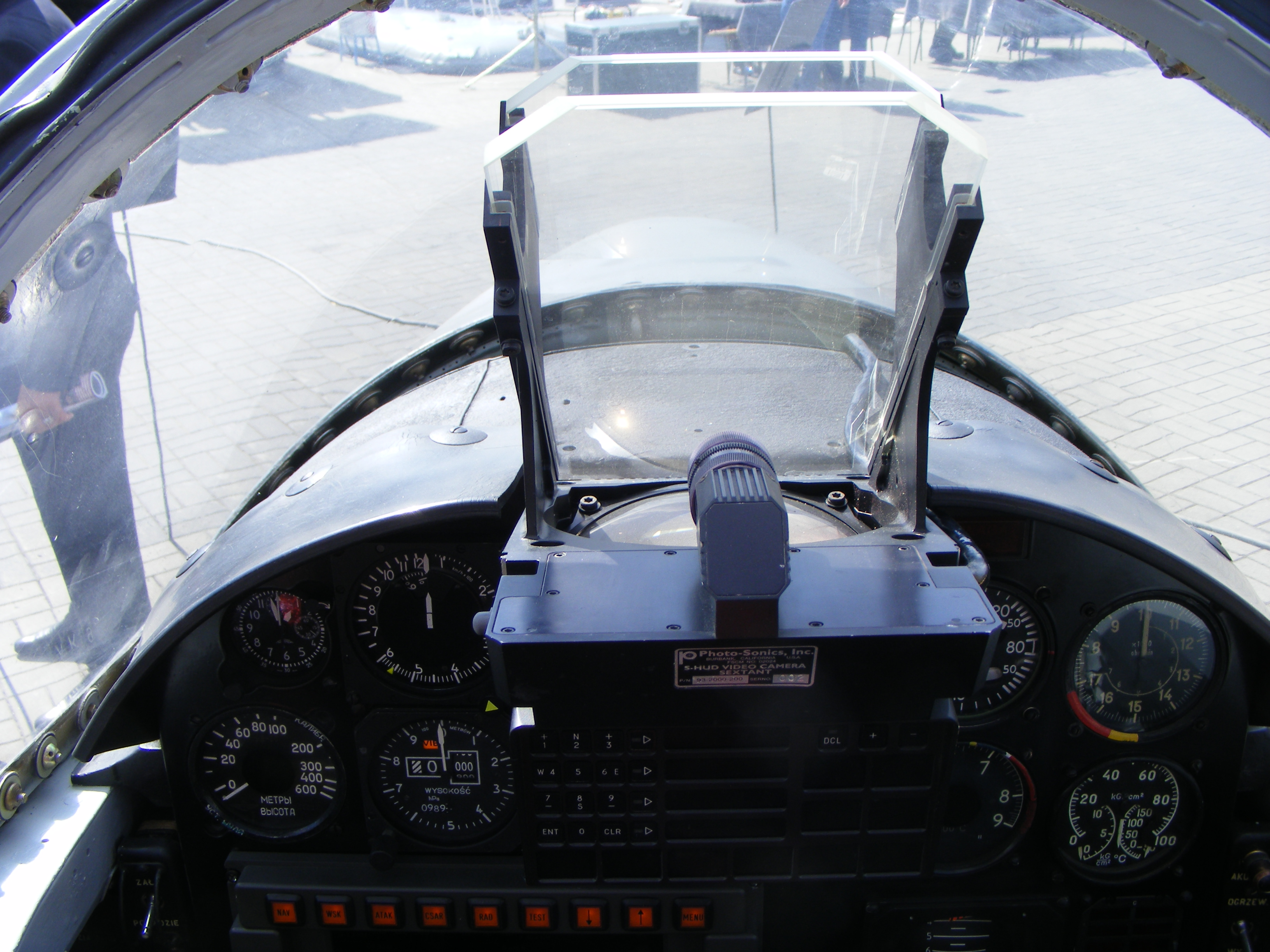
HUD mounted in a PZL TS-11 Iskra jet trainer aircraft with a glass plate combiner and a convex collimating lens just below it

A typical HUD contains three primary components: a projector unit, a combiner, and a video generation computer.

The projection unit in a typical HUD is an optical collimator setup: a convex lens or concave mirror with a cathode-ray tube, light emitting diode display, or liquid crystal display at its focus. This setup (a design that has been around since the invention of the reflector sight in 1900) produces an image where the light is collimated, i.e., the focal point is perceived to be at infinity.

The combiner is typically an angled flat piece of glass (a beam splitter) located directly in front of the viewer, that redirects the projected image from projector in such a way as to see the field of view and the projected infinity image at the same time. Combiners may have special coatings that reflect the monochromatic light projected onto it from the projector unit while allowing all other wavelengths of light to pass through. In some optical layouts combiners may also have a curved surface to refocus the image from the projector.

The computer provides the interface between the HUD (i.e., the projection unit) and the systems/data to be displayed and generates the imagery and symbology to be displayed by the projection unit.

=== Types ===
Other than fixed mounted HUD, there are also head-mounted displays (HMDs). These include helmet-mounted displays (both abbreviated HMDs), forms of HUD that feature a display element that moves with the orientation of the user's head.

Many modern fighters (such as the F/A-18, F-16, and Eurofighter) use both a HUD and HMD concurrently. The F-35 Lightning II was designed without a HUD, relying solely on the HMD, making it the first modern military fighter not to have a fixed HUD.

=== Generations ===
HUDs are split into four generations reflecting the technology used to generate the images:

- First Generation—Use a CRT to generate an image on a phosphor screen, having the disadvantage of the phosphor screen coating degrading over time. The majority of HUDs in operation today are of this type.
- Second Generation—Use a solid-state light source, for example LED, which is modulated by an LCD screen to display an image. These systems do not fade or require the high voltages of first generation systems. These systems are on commercial aircraft.
- Third Generation—Use optical waveguides to produce images directly in the combiner rather than use a projection system.
- Fourth Generation—Use a scanning laser to display images and even video imagery on a clear transparent medium.

Newer micro-display imaging technologies are being introduced, including liquid-crystal display (LCD), liquid crystal on silicon (LCoS), digital micro-mirrors (DMD), and organic light-emitting diode (OLED).

== History ==
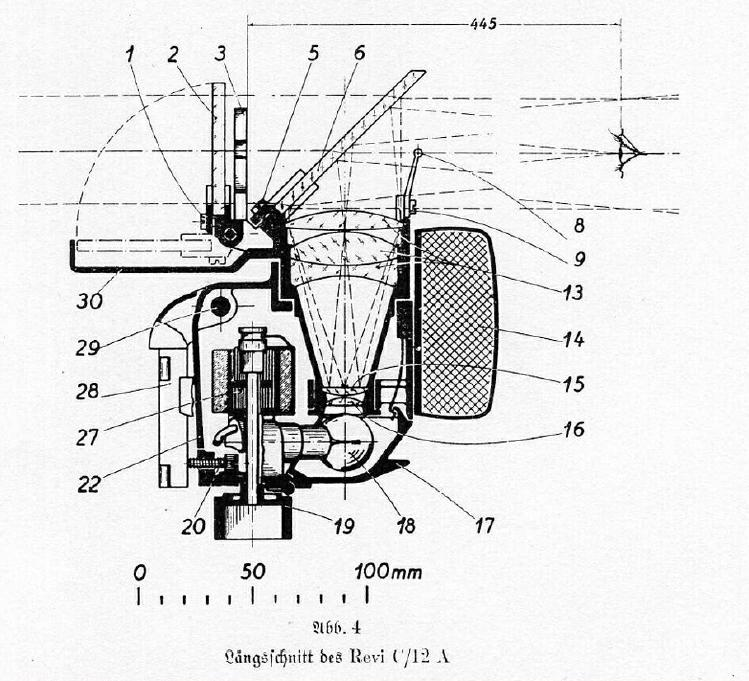
Longitudinal cross-section of a basic reflector sight (1937 German Revi C12/A)

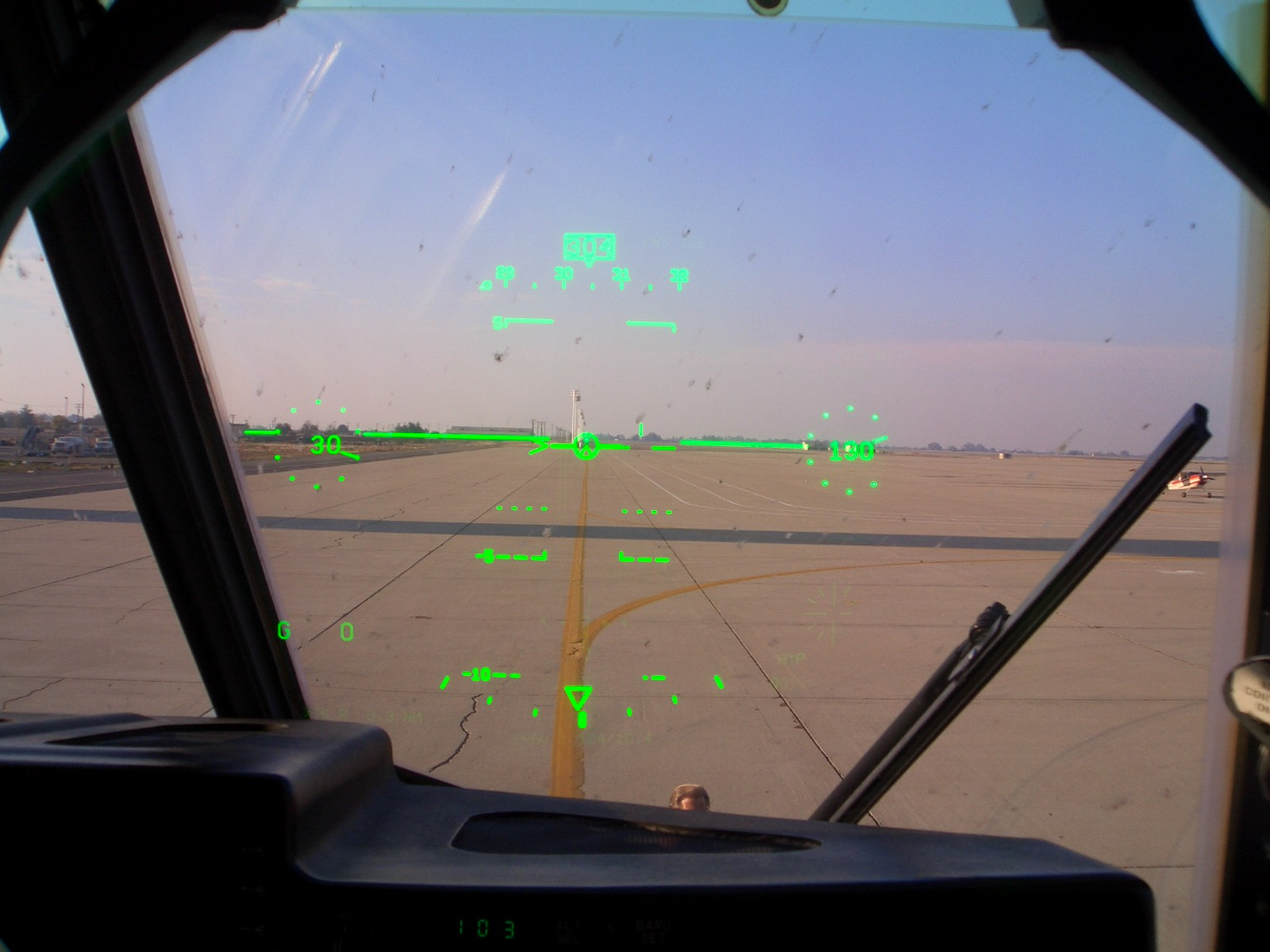
Copilot's HUD of a C-130J

HUDs evolved from the reflector sight, a pre-World War II parallax-free optical sight technology for military fighter aircraft. The gyro gunsight added a reticle that moved based on the speed and turn rate to solve for the amount of lead needed to hit a target while maneuvering.

During the early 1940s, the Telecommunications Research Establishment (TRE), in charge of UK radar development, found that Royal Air Force (RAF) night fighter pilots were having a hard time reacting to the verbal instruction of the radar operator as they approached their targets. They experimented with the addition of a second radar display for the pilot, but found they had trouble looking up from the lit screen into the dark sky in order to find the target. In October 1942 they had successfully combined the image from the radar tube with a projection from their standard GGS Mk. II gyro gunsight on a flat area of the windscreen, and later in the gunsight itself. A key upgrade was the move from the original AI Mk. IV radar to the microwave-frequency AI Mk. VIII radar found on the de Havilland Mosquito night fighter. This set produced an artificial horizon that further eased head-up flying.

In 1955 the US Navy's Office of Naval Research and Development did some research with a mockup HUD concept unit along with a sidestick controller in an attempt to ease the pilot's burden flying modern jet aircraft and make the instrumentation less complicated during flight. While their research was never incorporated in any aircraft of that time, the crude HUD mockup they built had all the features of today's modern HUD units.

HUD technology was next advanced by the Royal Navy in the Buccaneer, the prototype of which first flew on 30 April 1958. The aircraft was designed to fly at very low altitudes at very high speeds and drop bombs in engagements lasting seconds. As such, there was no time for the pilot to look up from the instruments to a bombsight. This led to the concept of a "Strike Sight" that would combine altitude, airspeed and the gun/bombsight into a single gunsight-like display. There was fierce competition between supporters of the new HUD design and supporters of the old electro-mechanical gunsight, with the HUD being described as a radical, even foolhardy option.

The Air Arm branch of the UK Ministry of Defence sponsored the development of a Strike Sight. The Royal Aircraft Establishment (RAE) designed the equipment and the earliest usage of the term "head-up-display" can be traced to this time. Production units were built by Rank Cintel, and the system was first integrated in 1958. The Cintel HUD business was taken over by Elliott Flight Automation and the Buccaneer HUD was manufactured and further developed, continuing up to a Mark III version with a total of 375 systems made; it was given a 'fit and forget' title by the Royal Navy and it was still in service nearly 25 years later. BAE Systems, as the successor to Elliotts via GEC-Marconi Avionics, thus has a claim to the world's first head-up display in operational service. A similar version that replaced the bombing modes with missile-attack modes was part of the AIRPASS HUD fitted to the English Electric Lightning from 1959.

In the United Kingdom, it was soon noted that pilots flying with the new gunsights were becoming better at piloting their aircraft. At this point, the HUD expanded its purpose beyond weapon aiming to general piloting. In the 1960s, French test-pilot Gilbert Klopfstein created the first modern HUD and a standardized system of HUD symbols so that pilots would only have to learn one system and could more easily transition between aircraft. The modern HUD used in instrument flight rules approaches to landing was developed in 1975. Klopfstein pioneered HUD technology in military fighter jets and helicopters, aiming to centralize critical flight data within the pilot's field of vision. This approach sought to increase the pilot's scan efficiency and reduce "task saturation" and information overload.

Use of HUDs then expanded beyond military aircraft. In the 1970s, the HUD was introduced to commercial aviation, and in 1988, the Oldsmobile Cutlass Supreme became the first production car with a head-up display.

Until a few years ago, the Embraer 190, Saab 2000, Boeing 727, and Boeing 737 Classic (737-300/400/500) and Next Generation aircraft (737-600/700/800/900 series) were the only commercial passenger aircraft available with HUDs. However, the technology is becoming more common with aircraft such as the Canadair RJ, Airbus A318 and several business jets featuring the displays. HUDs have become standard equipment on the Boeing 787. Furthermore, the Airbus A320, A330, A340 and A380 families are currently undergoing the certification process for a HUD. HUDs were also added to the Space Shuttle orbiter.

== Design factors ==
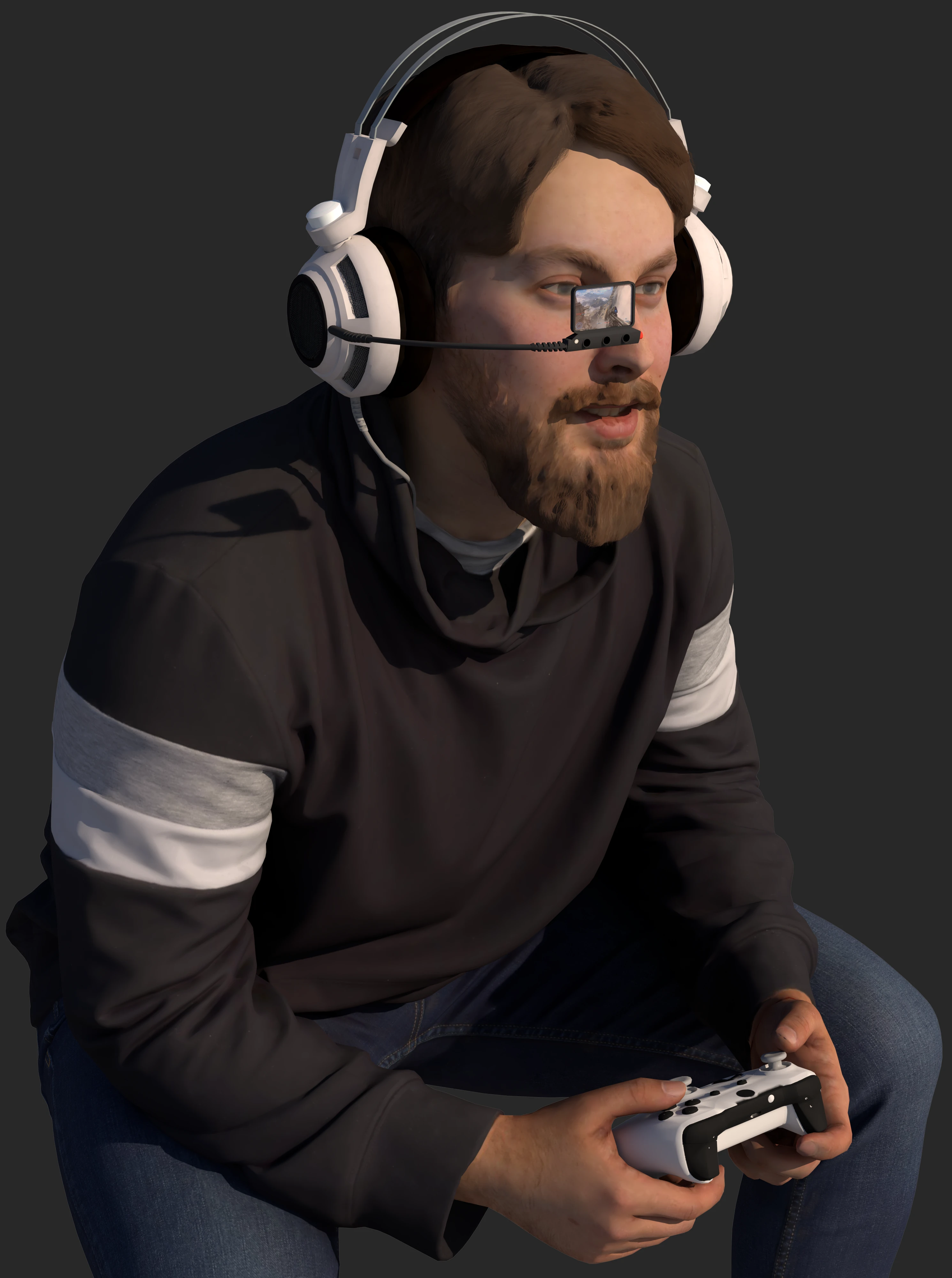
Headset computer concept

There are several factors that interplay in the design of a HUD:

- Field of View – also "FOV", indicates the angle(s), vertically as well as horizontally, subtended at the pilot's eye, at which the combiner displays symbology in relation to the outside view. A narrow FOV means that the view (of a runway, for example) through the combiner might include little additional information beyond the perimeters of the runway environment; whereas a wide FOV would allow a 'broader' view. For aviation applications, the major benefit of a wide FOV is that an aircraft approaching the runway in a crosswind might still have the runway in view through the combiner, even though the aircraft is pointed well away from the runway threshold; whereas with a narrow FOV the runway would be 'off the edge' of the combiner, out of the HUD's view. Because human eyes are separated, each eye receives a different image. The HUD image is viewable by one or both eyes, depending on technical and budget limitations in the design process. Modern expectations are that both eyes view the same image, in other words a "binocular Field of View (FOV)".
- Collimation – The projected image is collimated which makes the light rays parallel. Because the light rays are parallel the lens of the human eye focuses on infinity to get a clear image. Collimated images on the HUD combiner are perceived as existing at or near optical infinity. This means that the pilot's eyes do not need to refocus to view the outside world and the HUD display – the image appears to be "out there", overlaying the outside world. This feature is critical for effective HUDs: not having to refocus between HUD-displayed symbolic information and the outside world onto which that information is overlaid is one of the main advantages of collimated HUDs. It gives HUDs special consideration in safety-critical and time-critical manoeuvres, when the few seconds a pilot needs in order to re-focus inside the cockpit, and then back outside, are very critical: for example, in the final stages of landing. Collimation is therefore a primary distinguishing feature of high-performance HUDs and differentiates them from consumer-quality systems that, for example, simply reflect uncollimated information off a car's windshield (causing drivers to refocus and shift attention from the road ahead.)
- Eyebox – The optical collimator produces a cylinder of parallel light so the display can only be viewed while the viewer's eyes are somewhere within that cylinder, a three-dimensional area called the head motion box or eyebox. Modern HUD eyeboxes are usually about 5 lateral by 3 vertical by 6 longitudinal inches (13x8x15 cm.) This allows the viewer some freedom of head movement but movement too far up/down or left/right will cause the display to vanish off the edge of the collimator and movement too far back will cause it to crop off around the edge (vignette.) The pilot is able to view the entire display as long as one eye is inside the eyebox.
- Luminance/contrast – Displays have adjustments in luminance and contrast to account for ambient lighting, which can vary widely (e.g. from the glare of bright clouds to moonless night approaches to minimally lit fields.)
- Boresight – Aircraft HUD components are very accurately aligned with the aircraft's three axes – a process called boresighting – so that displayed data conforms to reality typically with an accuracy of ±7.0 milliradians (±24 minutes of arc), and may vary across the HUD's FOV. In this case the word "conform" means, "when an object is projected on the combiner and the actual object is visible, they will be aligned". This allows the display to show the pilot exactly where the artificial horizon is, as well as the aircraft's projected path with great accuracy. When Enhanced Vision is used, for example, the display of runway lights is aligned with the actual runway lights when the real lights become visible. Boresighting is done during the aircraft's building process and can also be performed in the field on many aircraft.
- Scaling – The displayed image (flight path, pitch and yaw scaling, etc.), is scaled to present to the pilot a picture that overlays the outside world in an exact 1:1 relationship. For example, objects (such as a runway threshold) that are 3 degrees below the horizon as viewed from the cockpit must appear at the −3 degree index on the HUD display.
- Compatibility – HUD components are designed to be compatible with other avionics, displays, etc.

== Aircraft ==
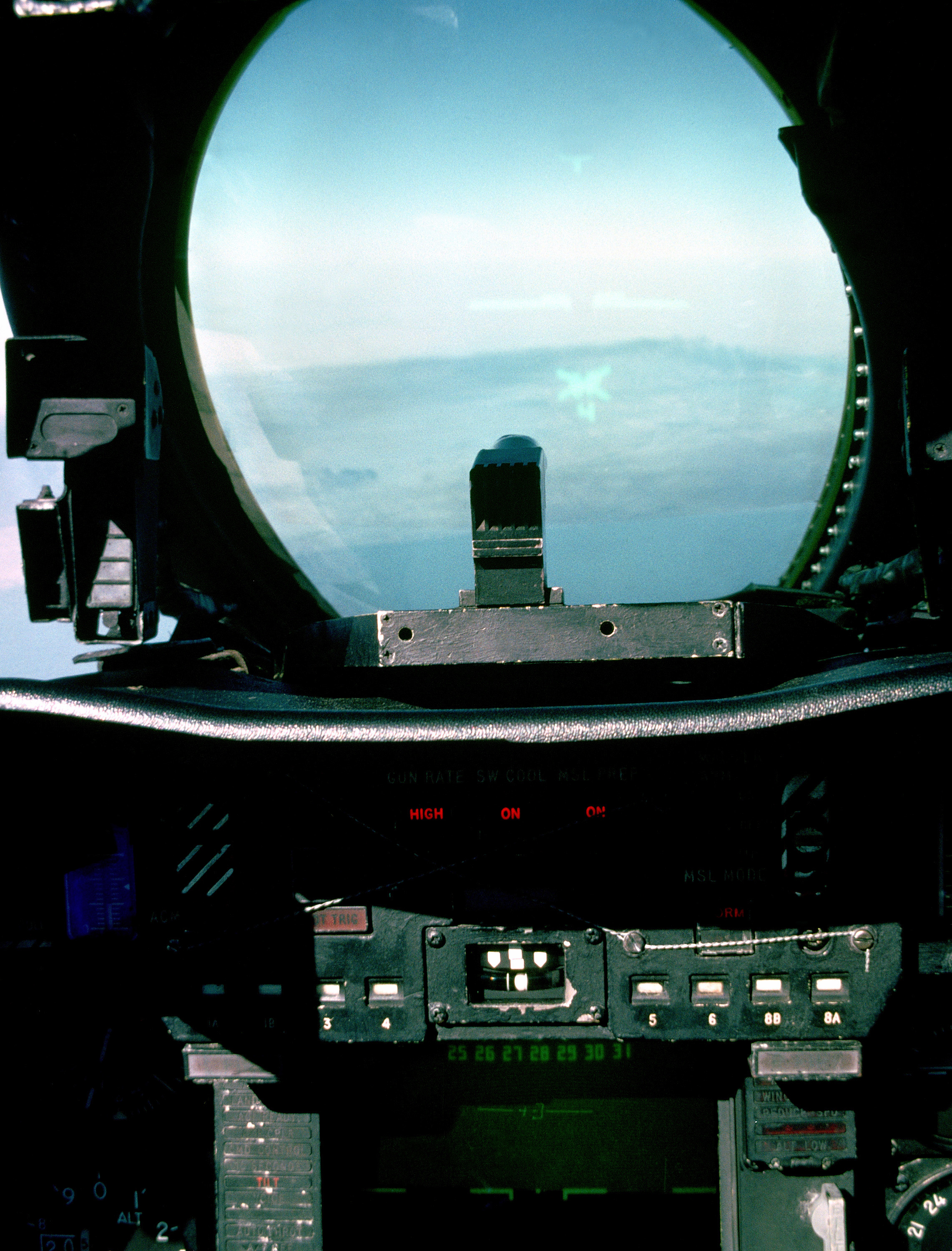
Head-up display of an F-14A Tomcat

On aircraft avionics systems, HUDs typically operate from dual independent redundant computer systems. They receive input directly from the sensors (pitot-static, gyroscopic, navigation, etc.) aboard the aircraft and perform their own computations rather than receiving previously computed data from the flight computers. On other aircraft (the Boeing 787, for example) the HUD guidance computation for Low Visibility Take-off (LVTO) and low visibility approach comes from the same flight guidance computer that drives the autopilot. Computers are integrated with the aircraft's systems and allow connectivity onto several different data buses such as the ARINC 429, ARINC 629, and MIL-STD-1553.

=== Displayed data ===
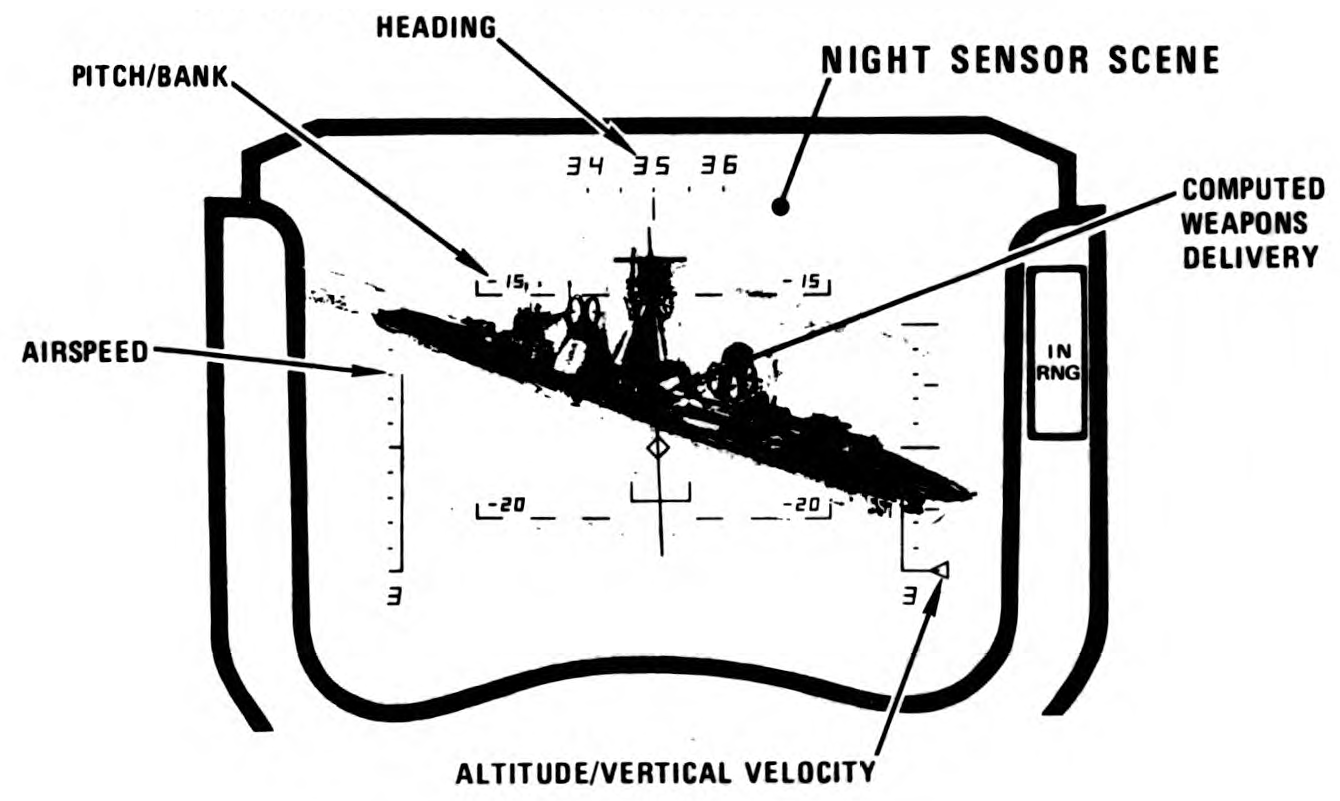
Displayed data symbology of a head-up display

Typical aircraft HUDs display airspeed, altitude, a horizon line, heading, turn/bank and slip/skid indicators. These instruments are the minimum required by 14 CFR Part 91.

Other symbols and data are also available in some HUDs:

- boresight or waterline symbol — is fixed on the display and shows where the nose of the aircraft is actually pointing.
- flight path vector (FPV) or velocity vector symbol — shows where the aircraft is actually going, as opposed to merely where it is pointed as with the boresight. For example, if the aircraft is pitched up but descending as may occur in high angle of attack flight or in flight through descending air, then the FPV symbol will be below the horizon even though the boresight symbol is above the horizon. During approach and landing, a pilot can fly the approach by keeping the FPV symbol at the desired descent angle and touchdown point on the runway.
- acceleration indicator or energy cue — typically to the left of the FPV symbol, it is above it if the aircraft is accelerating, and below the FPV symbol if decelerating.
- angle of attack indicator — shows the wing's angle relative to the airflow, often displayed as "α".
- navigation data and symbols — for approaches and landings, the flight guidance systems can provide visual cues based on navigation aids such as an Instrument Landing System or augmented Global Positioning System such as the Wide Area Augmentation System. Typically this is a circle which fits inside the flight path vector symbol. Pilots can fly along the correct flight path by "flying to" the guidance cue.

Since being introduced on HUDs, both the FPV and acceleration symbols are becoming standard on head-down displays (HDD.) The actual form of the FPV symbol on an HDD is not standardized but is usually a simple aircraft drawing, such as a circle with two short angled lines, (180 ± 30 degrees) and "wings" on the ends of the descending line. Keeping the FPV on the horizon allows the pilot to fly level turns in various angles of bank.

=== Military aircraft specific applications ===
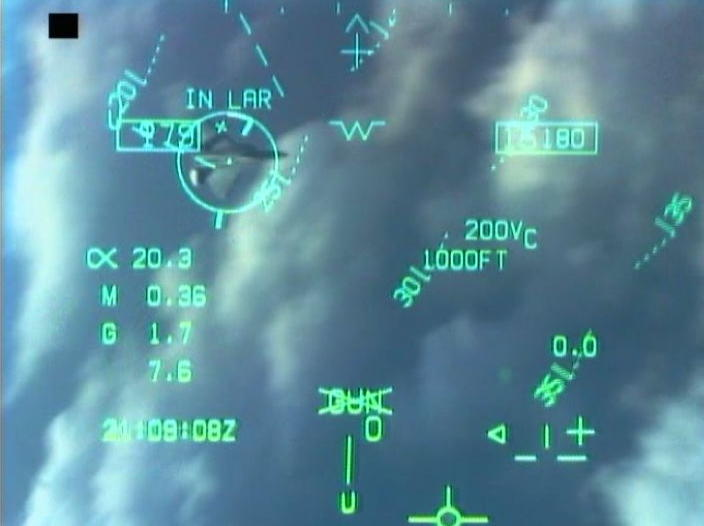
FA-18 HUD while engaged in a mock dogfight

In addition to the generic information described above, military applications include weapons system and sensor data such as:

- target designation (TD) indicator — places a cue over an air or ground target (which is typically derived from radar or inertial navigation system data.)
- V_{c} — closing velocity with target.
- Range — to target, waypoint, etc.
- weapon seeker or sensor line of sight — shows where a seeker or sensor is pointing.
- weapon status — includes type and number of weapons selected, available, arming, etc.

=== VTOL/STOL approaches and landings ===
During the 1980s, the United States military tested the use of HUDs in vertical take off and landing (VTOL) and short take off and landing (STOL) aircraft. A HUD format was developed at NASA Ames Research Center to provide pilots of VTOL and STOL aircraft with complete flight guidance and control information for Category III C terminal-area flight operations. This includes a large variety of flight operations, from STOL flights on land-based runways to VTOL operations on aircraft carriers. The principal features of this display format are the integration of the flightpath and pursuit guidance information into a narrow field of view, easily assimilated by the pilot with a single glance, and the superposition of vertical and horizontal situation information. The display is a derivative of a successful design developed for conventional transport aircraft.

=== Civil aircraft specific applications ===
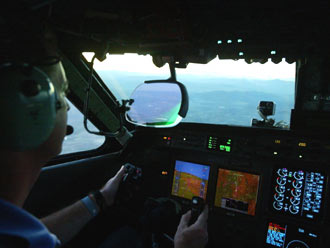
The cockpit of NASA's Gulfstream GV with a synthetic vision system display. The HUD combiner is in front of the pilot (with a projector mounted above it). This combiner uses a curved surface to focus the image.

The use of head-up displays allows commercial aircraft substantial flexibility in their operations. Systems have been approved which allow reduced-visibility takeoffs, and landings, as well as full manual Category III A landings and roll-outs. Initially expensive and physically large, these systems were only installed on larger aircraft able to support them. These tended to be the same aircraft that as standard supported autoland (with the exception of certain turbo-prop types that had HUD as an option) making the head-up display unnecessary for Cat III landings. This delayed the adoption of HUD in commercial aircraft. At the same time, studies have shown that the use of a HUD during landings decreases the lateral deviation from centerline in all landing conditions, although the touchdown point along the centerline is not changed.

For general aviation, MyGoFlight expects to receive a STC and to retail its SkyDisplay HUD for $25,000 without installation for a single piston-engine as the Cirrus SR22s and more for Cessna Caravans or Pilatus PC-12s single-engine turboprops: 5 to 10% of a traditional HUD cost albeit it is non-conformal, not matching exactly the outside terrain. Flight data from a tablet computer can be projected on the $1,800 Epic Optix Eagle 1 HUD.

=== Enhanced flight vision systems ===
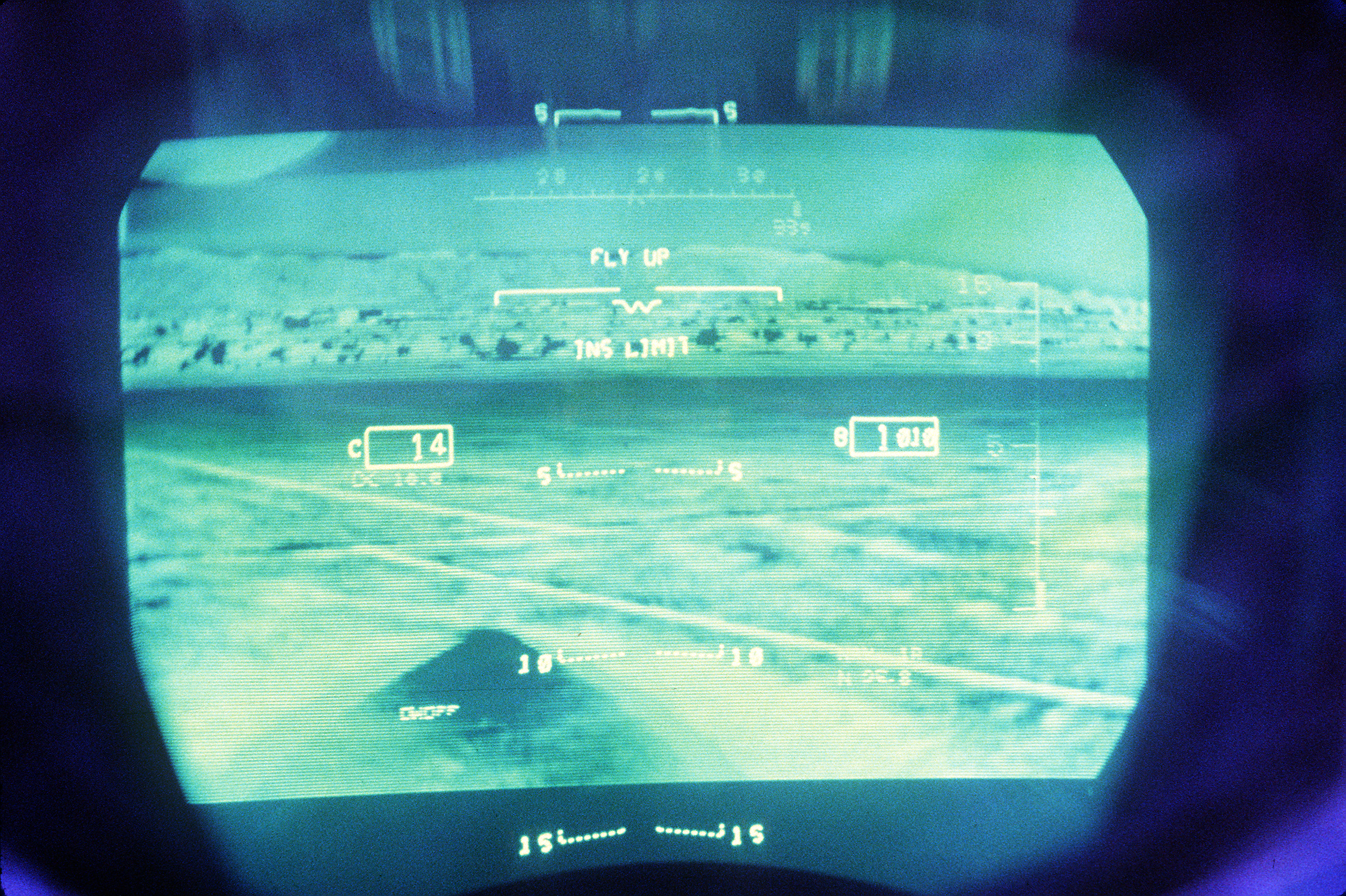
Thermal image viewed through a head-up display

In more advanced systems, such as the US Federal Aviation Administration (FAA)-labeled 'Enhanced Flight Vision System', a real-world visual image can be overlaid onto the combiner. Typically an infrared camera (either single or multi-band) is installed in the nose of the aircraft to display a conformed image to the pilot. "EVS Enhanced Vision System" is an industry-accepted term which the FAA decided not to use because "the FAA believes [it] could be confused with the system definition and operational concept found in 91.175(l) and (m)" In one EVS installation, the camera is actually installed at the top of the vertical stabilizer rather than "as close as practical to the pilots eye position". When used with a HUD however, the camera must be mounted as close as possible to the pilots eye point as the image is expected to "overlay" the real world as the pilot looks through the combiner.

"Registration", or the accurate overlay of the EVS image with the real world image, is one feature closely examined by authorities prior to approval of a HUD based EVS. This is because of the importance of the HUD matching the real world and therefore being able to provide accurate data rather than misleading information.

While the EVS display can greatly help, the FAA has only relaxed operating regulations so an aircraft with EVS can perform a CATEGORY I approach to CATEGORY II minimums. In all other cases the flight crew must comply with all "unaided" visual restrictions. (For example, if the runway visibility is restricted because of fog, even though EVS may provide a clear visual image it is not appropriate (or legal) to maneuver the aircraft using only the EVS below 100 feet above ground level.)

=== Synthetic vision systems ===
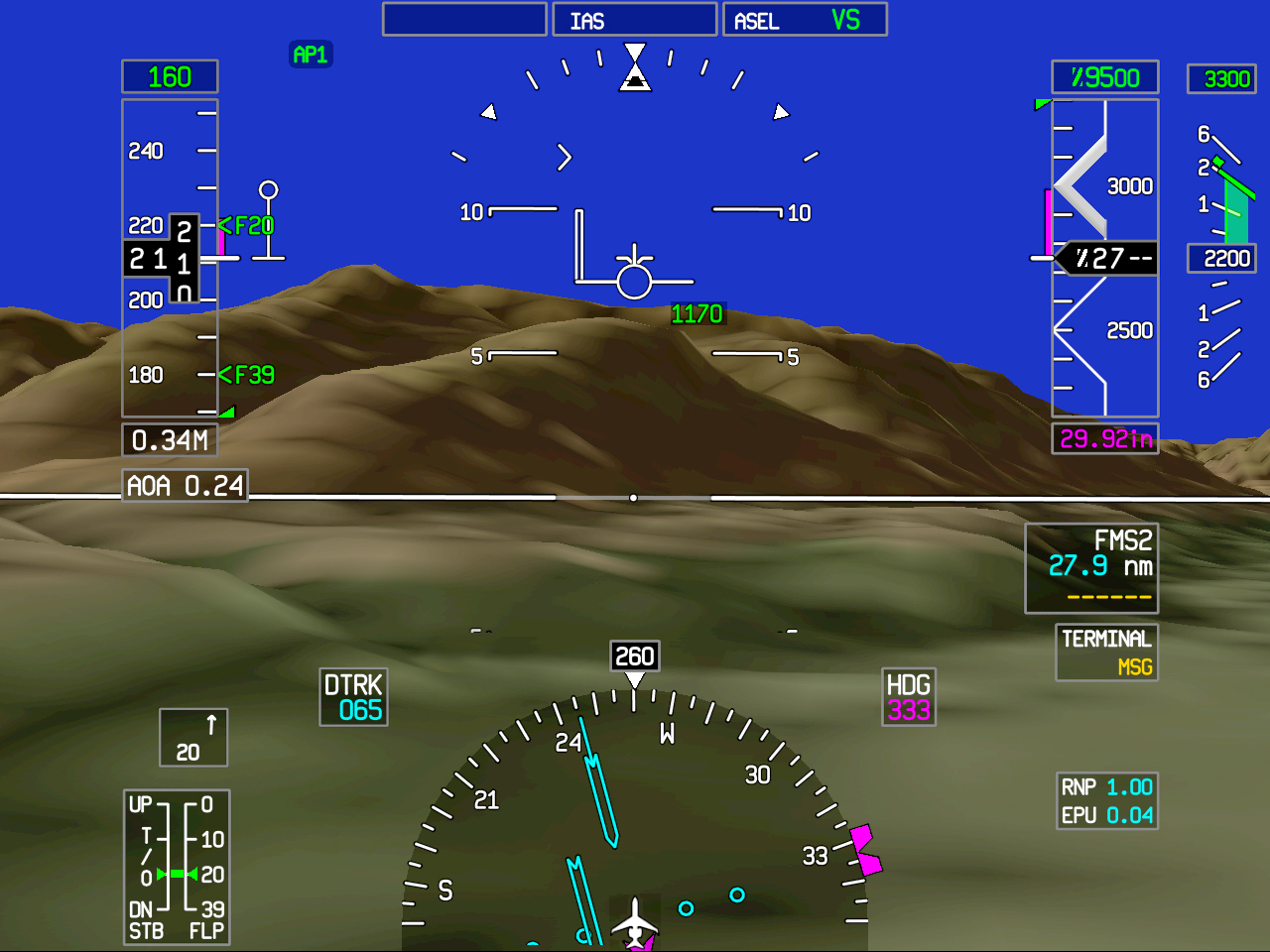
A synthetic vision system display (Honeywell)

HUD systems are also being designed to display a synthetic vision system (SVS) graphic image, which uses high precision navigation, attitude, altitude and terrain databases to create realistic and intuitive views of the outside world.

In the 1st SVS head down image shown on the right, immediately visible indicators include the airspeed tape on the left, altitude tape on the right, and turn/bank/slip/skid displays at the top center. The boresight symbol (-v-) is in the center and directly below that is the flight path vector (FPV) symbol (the circle with short wings and a vertical stabilizer.) The horizon line is visible running across the display with a break at the center, and directly to the left are numbers at ±10 degrees with a short line at ±5 degrees (the +5 degree line is easier to see) which, along with the horizon line, show the pitch of the aircraft. Unlike this color depiction of SVS on a head down primary flight display, the SVS displayed on a HUD is monochrome – that is, typically, in shades of green.

The image indicates a wings level aircraft (i.e. the flight path vector symbol is flat relative to the horizon line and there is zero roll on the turn/bank indicator.) Airspeed is 140 knots, altitude is 9,450 feet, heading is 343 degrees (the number below the turn/bank indicator.) Close inspection of the image shows a small purple circle which is displaced from the flight path vector slightly to the lower right. This is the guidance cue coming from the Flight Guidance System. When stabilized on the approach, this purple symbol should be centered within the FPV.

The terrain is entirely computer generated from a high resolution terrain database.

In some systems, the SVS will calculate the aircraft's current flight path, or possible flight path (based on an aircraft performance model, the aircraft's current energy, and surrounding terrain) and then turn any obstructions red to alert the flight crew. Such a system might have helped prevent the crash of American Airlines Flight 965 into a mountain in December 1995.

On the left side of the display is an SVS-unique symbol, with the appearance of a purple, diminishing sideways ladder, and which continues on the right of the display. The two lines define a "tunnel in the sky". This symbol defines the desired trajectory of the aircraft in three dimensions. For example, if the pilot had selected an airport to the left, then this symbol would curve off to the left and down. If the pilot keeps the flight path vector alongside the trajectory symbol, the craft will fly the optimum path. This path would be based on information stored in the Flight Management System's database and would show the FAA-approved approach for that airport.

The tunnel in the sky can also greatly assist the pilot when more precise four-dimensional flying is required, such as the decreased vertical or horizontal clearance requirements of Required Navigation Performance (RNP.) Under such conditions the pilot is given a graphical depiction of where the aircraft should be and where it should be going rather than the pilot having to mentally integrate altitude, airspeed, heading, energy and longitude and latitude to correctly fly the aircraft.

== Tanks ==
In mid-2017, the Israel Defense Forces will begin trials of Elbit's Iron Vision, the world's first helmet-mounted head-up display for tanks. Israel's Elbit, which developed the helmet-mounted display system for the F-35, plans Iron Vision to use a number of externally mounted cameras to project the 360° view of a tank's surroundings onto the helmet-mounted visors of its crew members. This allows the crew members to stay inside the tank, without having to open the hatches to see outside.

A program announced in 2025 by a collaboration of Patria Technologies and Distance Technologies aims to place the head-up display on the windshield of vehicles, so as to not require a helmet. The program also intends on using AI to aid in data display and processing.

== Automobiles ==
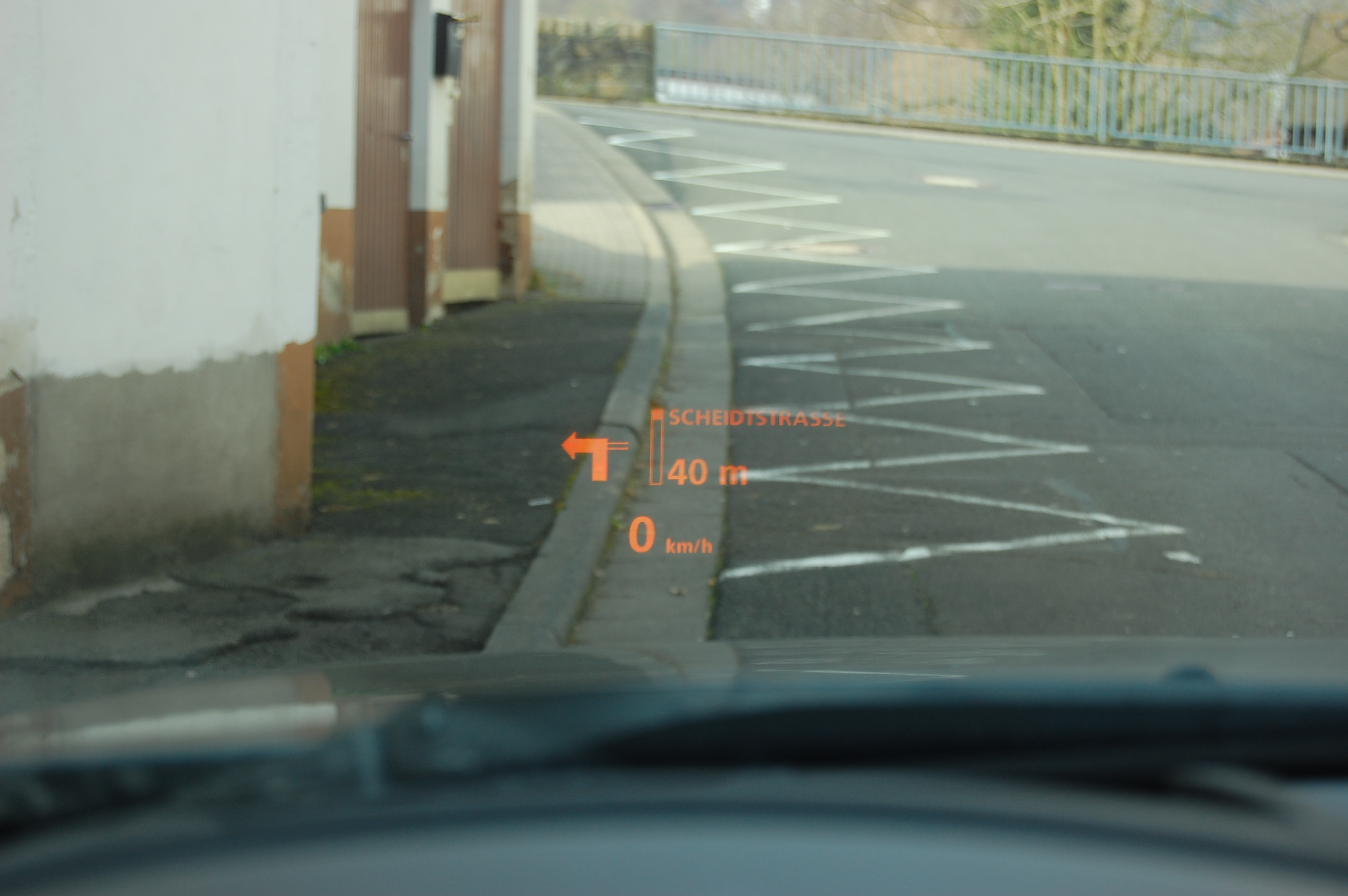
HUD in a BMW E60

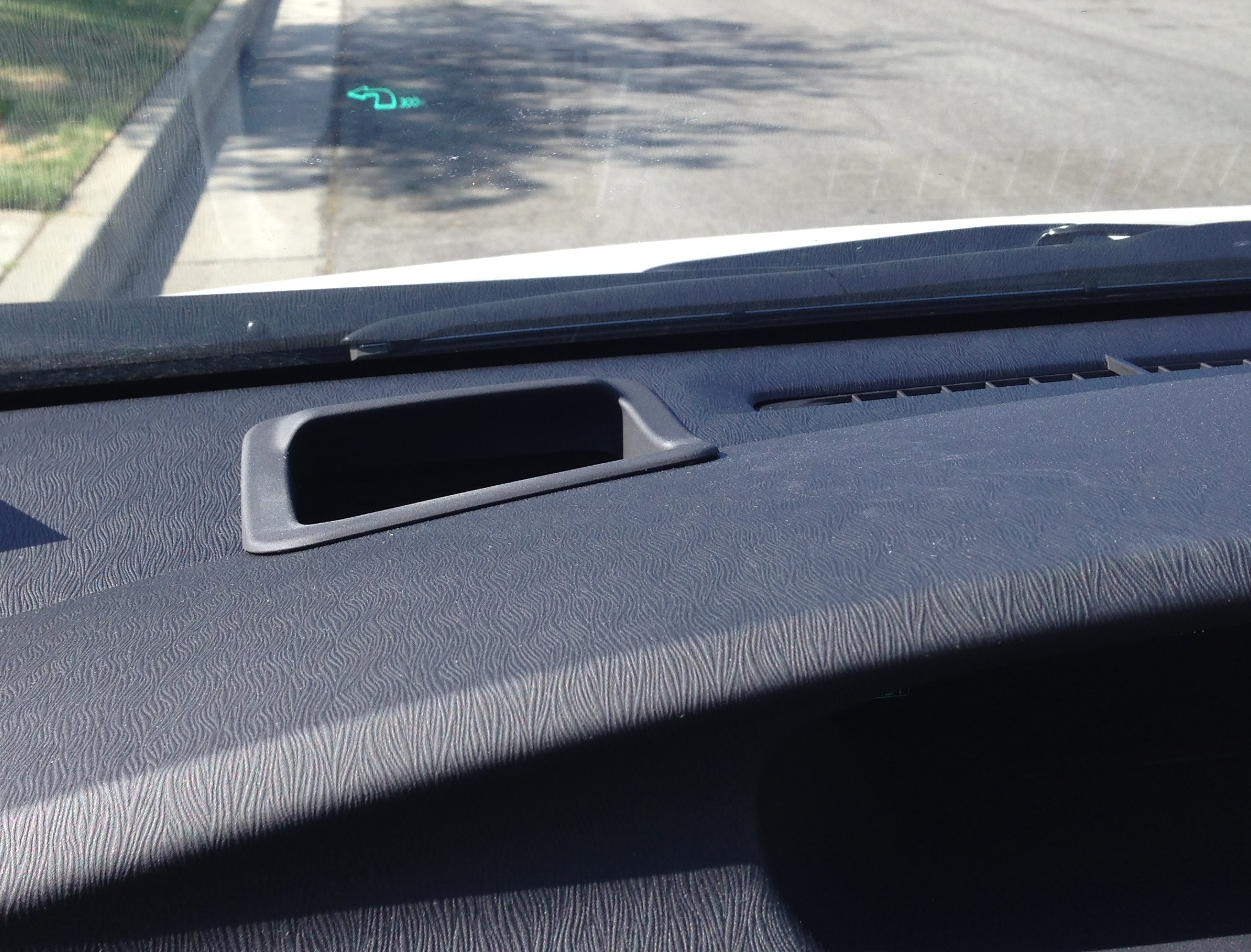
The green arrow on the windshield near the top of this picture is a Head-Up Display on a 2013 Toyota Prius. It toggles between the GPS navigation instruction arrow and the speedometer. The arrow is animated to appear scrolling forward as the car approaches the turn. The image is projected without any kind of glass combiner.

These displays are becoming increasingly available in production cars, and usually offer speedometer, tachometer, and navigation system displays. Night vision information is also displayed via HUD on certain automobiles. In contrast to most HUDs found in aircraft, automotive head-up displays are not parallax-free. The display may not be visible to a driver wearing sunglasses with polarised lenses.

Add-on HUD systems also exist, projecting the display onto a glass combiner mounted above or below the windshield, or using the windshield itself as the combiner.

The first in-car HUD was developed by General Motors Corporation in 1999 with the function of displaying the navigation service in front of the driver's line of sight. Moving into 2010, AR technology was introduced and combined with the existing in-car HUD. Based on this technology, the navigation service began to be displayed on the windshield of the vehicle.

In 2012, Pioneer Corporation introduced a HUD navigation system that replaces the driver-side sun visor and visually overlays animations of conditions ahead, a form of augmented reality (AR). Developed by Pioneer Corporation, AR-HUD became the first aftermarket automotive Head-Up Display to use a direct-to-eye laser beam scanning method, also known as virtual retinal display (VRD.) AR-HUD's core technology involves a miniature laser beam scanning display developed by MicroVision, Inc.

Motorcycle helmet HUDs are also commercially available.

In recent years, it has been argued that conventional HUDs will be replaced by holographic AR technologies, such as the ones developed by WayRay that use holographic optical elements (HOE.) The HOE allows for a wider field of view while reducing the size of the device and making the solution customizable for any car model. Mercedes Benz introduced an Augmented Reality-based Head Up Display while Faurecia invested in an eye gaze and finger controlled head up display.

== Further development and experimental uses ==
HUDs have been proposed or are being experimentally developed for a number of other applications. In military settings, a HUD can be used to overlay tactical information such as the output of a laser rangefinder or squadmate locations to infantrymen. A prototype HUD has also been developed that displays information on the inside of a swimmer's goggles or of a scuba diver's mask. HUD systems that project information directly onto the wearer's retina with a low-powered laser (virtual retinal display) are also being tested.

A HUD product developed in 2012 could perform real-time language translation. In an implementation of an Optical head-mounted display, the EyeTap product allows superimposed computer-generated graphic files to be displayed on a lens. The Google Glass was another early product.

== See also ==
- Index of aviation articles
- Acronyms and abbreviations in avionics
- Augmented reality
- Eyes-on-the-Road-Benefit
- HUD (video gaming)
- Pepper's ghost - Stage play version of a similar reflection effect
- Smartglasses
- Virtual retinal display
- VR positional tracking
- Wearable computer
