= Rinspeed Presto =

The Rinspeed Presto is a concept car from the Swiss company Rinspeed, unveiled in 2002. At the touch of a button, it would expand it from a 2.7 metre, two-seat cabrio to a 3.6 metre, four-seater. It has a Pre-preg composite plastic body and runs on natural gas.

The transformation is made possible by a centrally located electric motor, which stretches the vehicle with the help of two mechanical screw-and-nut gears by exactly 746 millimetres to its full extended length of 3.74 metres. The longitudinal members run on low-friction precision rollers and disappear like a drawer in the rear of the floor pan. Despite its variable length the engineers succeeded in designing the adjustable floor pan with the torsional rigidity necessary for a roadster. To ensure absolute operational safety the extension mechanism also features self-locking safety latches. The car lacks a roof and doors.

Conversion: A four-cylinder, 1.7-litre common-rail turbo diesel engine in dual-fuel configuration, based on a Mercedes-Benz A-Class, runs on a mixture of natural gas and diesel fuel at a 40/60 ratio. Natural gas is a very clean-burning fuel, which consists almost entirely of methane with sulfur content near zero. However, since a diesel engine has no spark plug to act as an ignition source, operation on natural gas alone is technically impossible. The operating principle of the dual-fuel engine is simple: Natural gas is injected into the intake air of the engine. Just like in the production engine the diesel fuel is injected into the combustion chamber where it ignites a mixture of natural gas and air rather than just plain air.

To configure the turbocharged in-line engine for dual-fuel operation, a number of modifications are required, including installation of a tank for the natural gas and a gas-injection system. At the heart of the modifications is a reprogrammed engine management system. Should the system malfunction it reverts to the standard diesel mapped ignition, thus offering the same reliability as the production car.
