= Rinspeed sQuba =

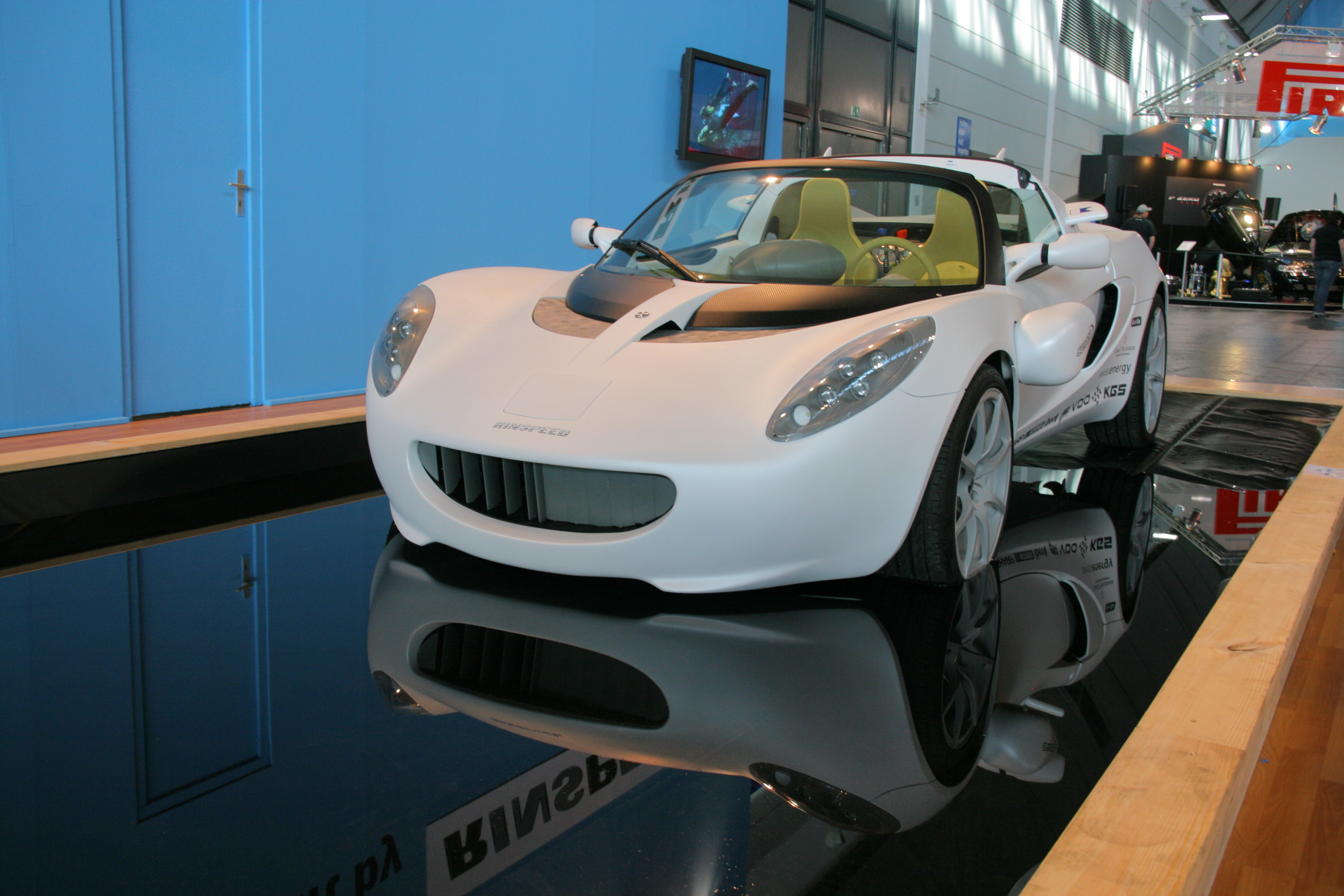

Overview
- Manufacturer: Rinspeed
- Production: Concept car (completed in 2008)
- Assembly: Zumikon, Switzerland

Body and chassis
- Class: Amphibious; Convertible
- Body style: 2-door convertible
- Layout: FR layout
- Related: Lotus Elise

Powertrain
- Engine: Street: 54 kW electric Propeller: 2 × 800 W electric Blow jets: 2 × 3.6 kW Rotinor
- Transmission: R - N - F
- Battery: rechargeable Li-ion

Dimensions
- Wheelbase: 2,300 mm (91 in)
- Length: 3,785 mm (149.0 in)
- Width: 1,940 mm (76 in)
- Height: 1,117 mm (44.0 in)

The sQuba, developed by Swiss company Rinspeed, is the world's first car that can be driven both on land and underwater. The original idea by Rinspeed founder and CEO Frank M. Rinderknecht was inspired by the 1977 James Bond film The Spy Who Loved Me. The chassis from the Lotus Elise is used as the base for this vehicle.

== Description ==
The sQuba is a zero-emission, all electric vehicle which uses three electric motors, one for land travel, two for water. It drives on land powered by its electric rear-wheel drive powertrain, using rechargeable lithium-ion batteries. Upon entering water, it floats on the surface until the operator floods the interior to submerge it. It can be submerged to a depth of 10 metres (33 ft), powered by twin electric-powered propellers supplemented by two Seabob water jets. It travels through the water like a submarine, rather than driving along the river- or sea-bed. The car's top land speed is 120 km/h (75 mph). On the surface of water, the top speed is 6 km/h (3.2 kn; 3.7 mph) and underwater it is 3 km/h (1.6 kn; 1.9 mph).

The vehicle has an open cockpit to allow the occupants to escape easily in case of emergency. It can transport a driver and passenger. When underwater, the occupants breathe air carried in the vehicle through scuba-style diving regulators. Without occupants, the sQuba will surface automatically. The twin water jets mounted on rotating louvers at the front of the vehicle provide steering and lift while it is underwater, and the propellers at the rear provide forward movement.

The vehicle's interior is water- and salt-resistant so that it can be driven in the ocean.

The sQuba also comes equipped with a laser sensor system made by autonomous cruise control system manufacturer Ibeo to allow autonomous operation.

== Announcement ==
The sQuba was presented to the public for the first time at the Geneva Motor Show on 16 March 2008.

== Prototype and production ==
The inspiration for the sQuba was the Lotus Esprit driven by James Bond in The Spy Who Loved Me. During the thirty years since the movie premiered, Rinspeed founder and CEO Frank M. Rinderknecht wanted to build a car that could move underwater like a submarine.

The existing, functioning prototype cost more than US$1.5 million to build. When the sQuba enters production, they are expected to "cost less than a Rolls-Royce", according to Rinderknecht. A production schedule has not been made.

Rinderknecht admitted in 2008 that there would be limited appeal for a car that can dive underwater. The car was to be marketed as a "toy for rich people".

As of 2021 the "2008 Rinspeed sQuba" was listed as a project on the Rinspeed Website, with no new information or indication of availability or price.
