= Dodge Viper (SR I) =

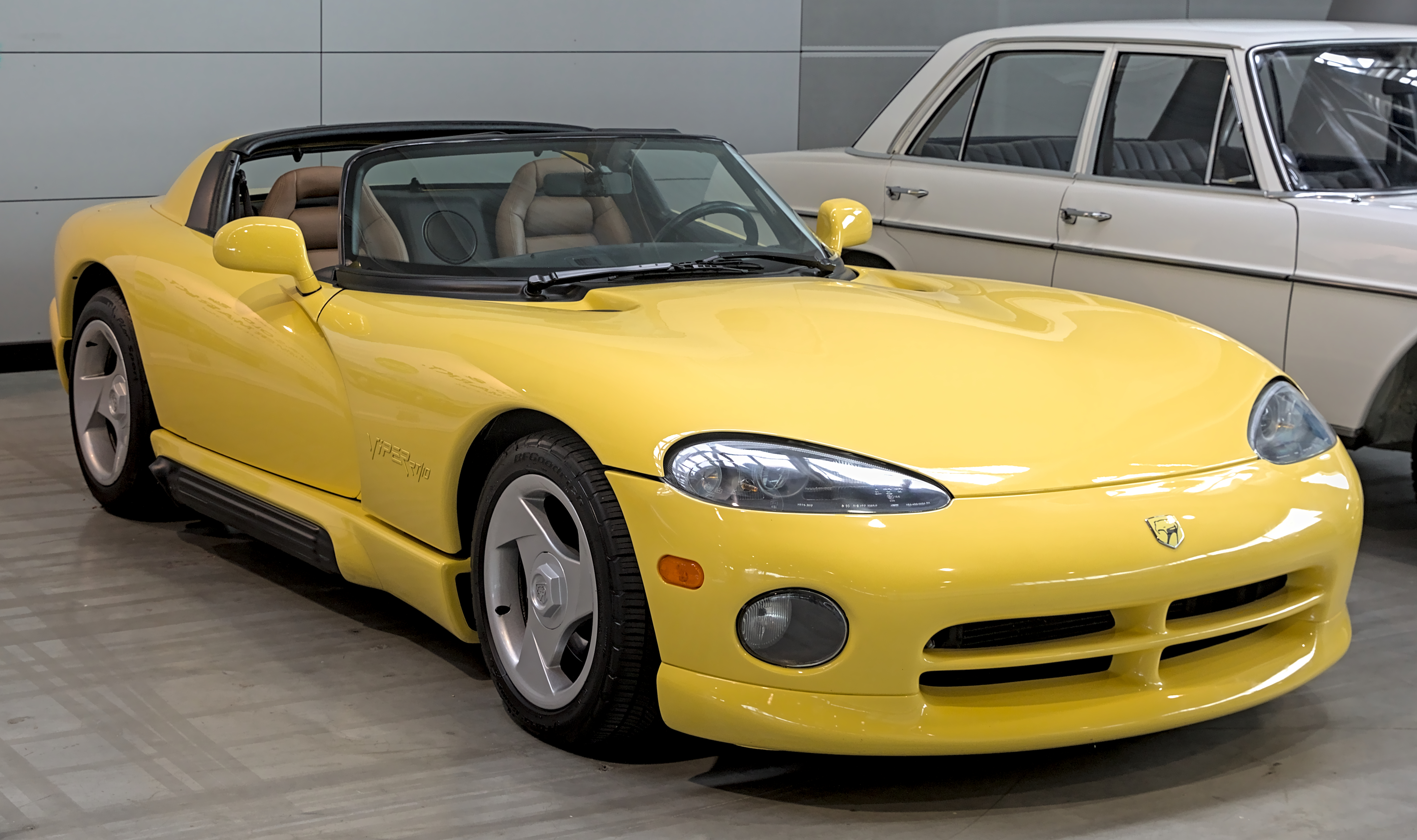

Overview
- Also called: Chrysler Viper (Europe)
- Production: 1991–1995; 5,988 units
- Model years: 1992–1995
- Assembly: New Mack Assembly, Detroit, Michigan, United States
- Designer: Tom Gale (1990)

Body and chassis
- Class: Sports car (S)
- Body style: 2-door targa
- Layout: FR layout
- Related: Rinspeed Veleno

Powertrain
- Engine: 8.0-liter (488.1 cu in) odd-firing Viper EWA V10
- Power output: 400 hp (298 kW); 465 lb⋅ft (630 N⋅m)
- Transmission: 6-speed BorgWarner T56 manual

Dimensions
- Wheelbase: 2,446 mm (96.3 in)
- Length: 4,450 mm (175.2 in)
- Width: 1,920 mm (75.6 in)
- Height: 1,120 mm (44.1 in)
- Curb weight: 1,490 kg (3,285 lb)

Chronology
- Successor: Dodge Viper (SR II)

The Dodge Viper (SR I) is the first-generation Viper sports car, manufactured by American automobile manufacturer Dodge. It was originally tested in January 1989 as a prototype, then later introduced in 1991 as a pace car for the Indianapolis 500, then finally going on sale in January 1992.

The SR I began the Dodge Viper model lineup, which would continue on until 2017, consisting of five generations.

The SRI was replaced by the updated SRII after a series of updates in 1995.

== History and development ==
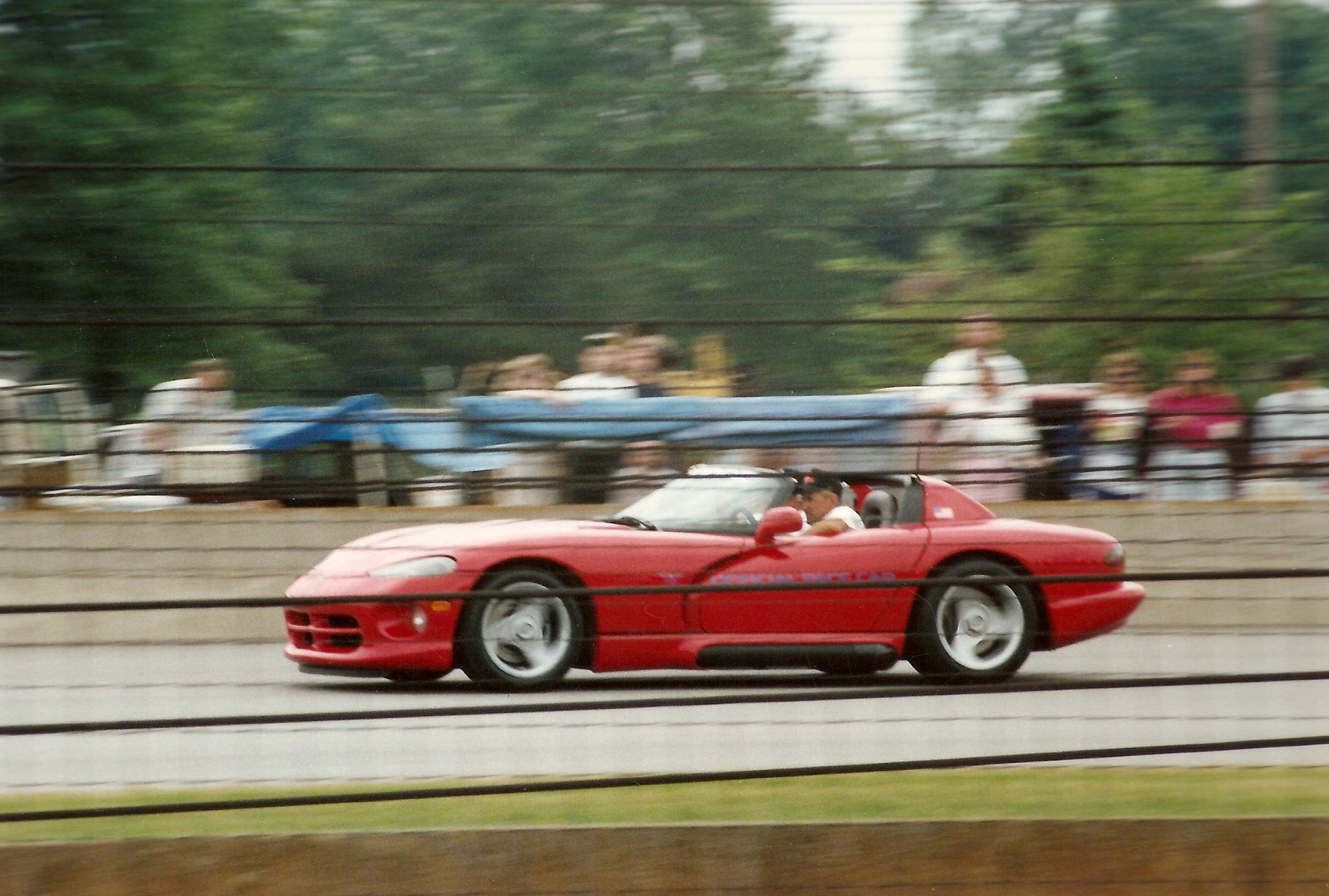
The pre-production Dodge Viper (SR I) as the pace car for the 1991 Indianapolis 500.

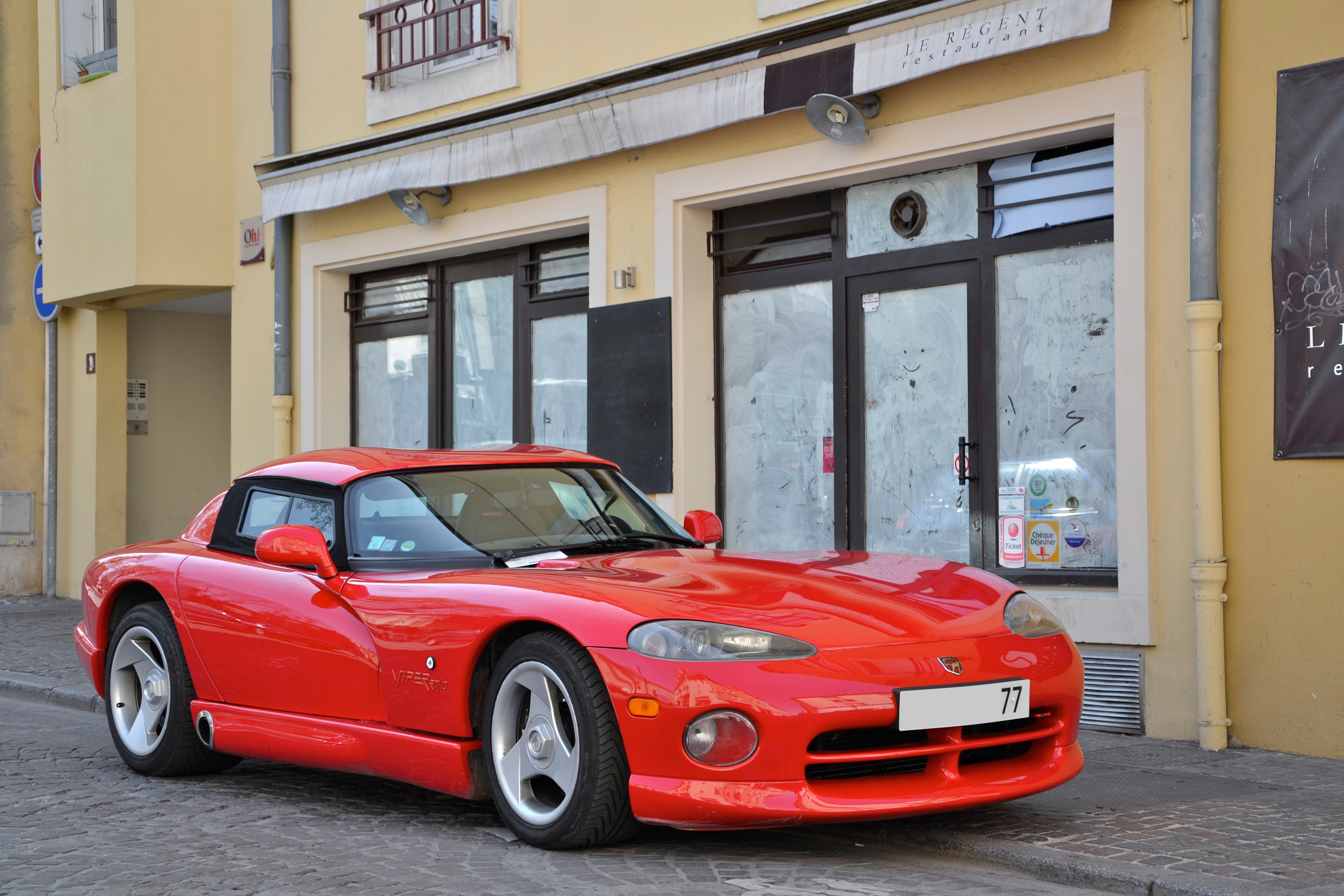
The lightweight hard top became an option for the Viper in 1994

The original Viper was intended to be a performance sports car. The project was started in 1988 at Chrysler's Advanced Design Studios, when then-president Bob Lutz suggested to Tom Gale that the company should consider the production of a modern Cobra. A clay model was created months later, and the car later appeared as a concept in 1989 at the North American International Auto Show. Chief engineer Roy Sjoberg was then directed to develop the car after public reactions of the initial concept were highly positive.

"Team Viper" was later formed with 85 engineers selected by Sjoberg, and development of the car began in March 1989, with full completion in February 1990.

It was later introduced in 1991 at the Indianapolis 500 of that year with a pre-production car driven by Carroll Shelby, being forced to replace the Dodge Stealth because of complaints coming from the United Automobile Workers. It later went on sale as the Dodge Viper RT/10 Roadster in January 1992.

== Engineering and design ==
The Viper lacks modern driver aids such as traction control and anti-lock brakes. The car also has no exterior-mounted door handles or key locks, and instead, entry is done by unzipping a vinyl window to reach the interior door release handle (when the canvas/hard top is in place). No air conditioning was installed on the car (the option for A/C was added in later 1994 models). There were also no airbags for weight reduction. The roof was made from canvas, and the windows were made from vinyl and used zippers to open and close. Despite these lack of features, the car still had some features in order for it to be tolerable as a daily driving car, such as manually-adjustable seats with lumbar support, an AM/FM cassette stereo player, a clock, and carpeting.

Later models of the Viper allowed the option for a lightweight fiberglass hard top to replace the standard canvas soft top.

Lamborghini, who was owned by Chrysler Corporation at the time, assisted with the design of the aluminum-alloy V10 engine for the car, with the design based on Chrysler's LA engine. Dick Winkles, the chief power engineer, was a major contributor on the engine project, and had spent time in Italy for the purpose of the engine's development.

== Specifications and performance ==
The V10 engine generated a maximum power output of 400 hp (298 kW; 406 PS) at 4,600 rpm and 450 lb⋅ft (610 N⋅m) at 3,600 rpm, and weighed 323 kg (712 lb). Fuel economy rated by the United States Environmental Protection Agency was 12 mpg_{‑US} (20 L/100 km; 14 mpg_{‑imp}) during city driving and 20 mpg_{‑US} (12 L/100 km; 24 mpg_{‑imp}) on the highway, all made possible due to long gearing.

The Viper has a curb weight of 1,490 kg (3,285 lb), with the body's tubular steel frame and resin-transfer molding fiberglass panels. It uses an unequal length double wishbone suspension system with four wheel 13.0 inch vented disc brakes.

Chrysler claimed the Viper is able to accelerate from 0–60 mph (0–97 km/h) in 4.5 seconds and can complete a quarter mile (402 m) in 12.9 seconds at 113 mph (182 km/h). Car and Driver achieved a 0–60 mph (0–97 km/h) time of 4.4 seconds, a 0–100 mph (0–161 km/h) time of 10.8 seconds, a quarter mile time of 13.1 seconds at 108 mph (174 km/h) and a maximum speed of 163 mph (262 km/h). Its large tires allowed the car to average a claimed 0.95 lateral g in corners, which placed it among the best performance cars of its day; however, the car's handling proved tricky for unskilled drivers.

== Gallery ==
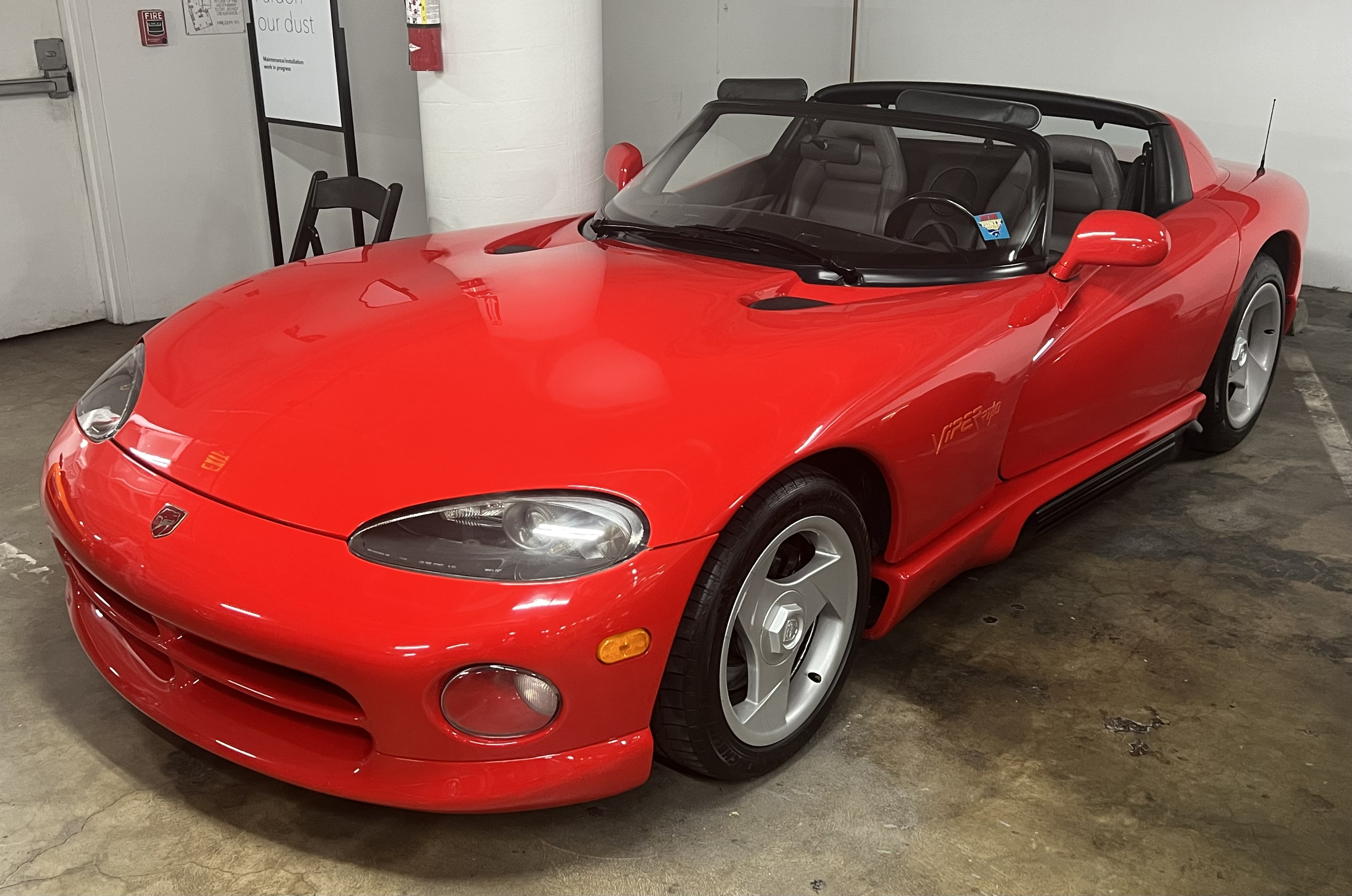
Front view (open top) of the fifth Viper to roll off the production line, part of the Viper's pilot program

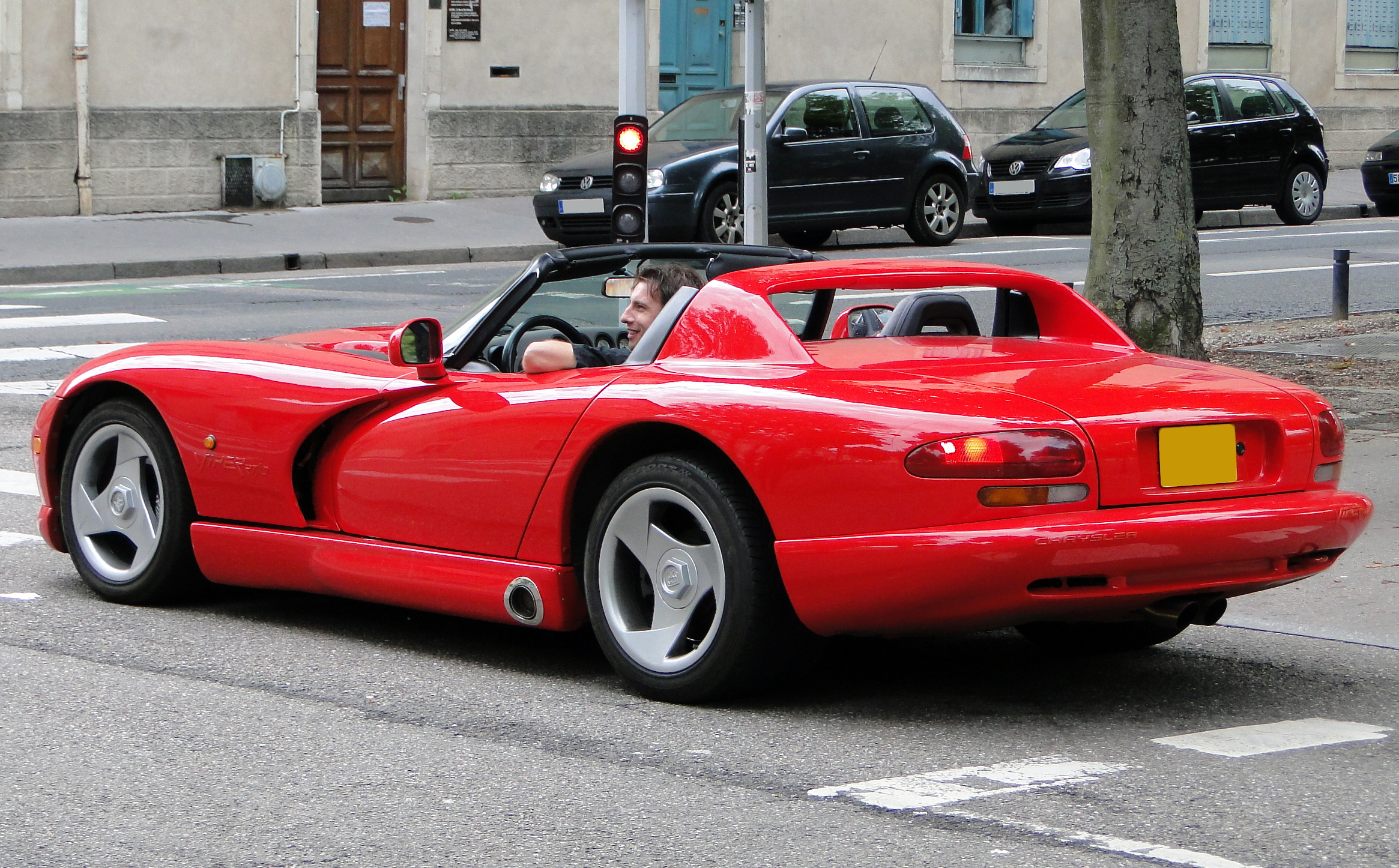
Rear view (open top) of Chrysler version

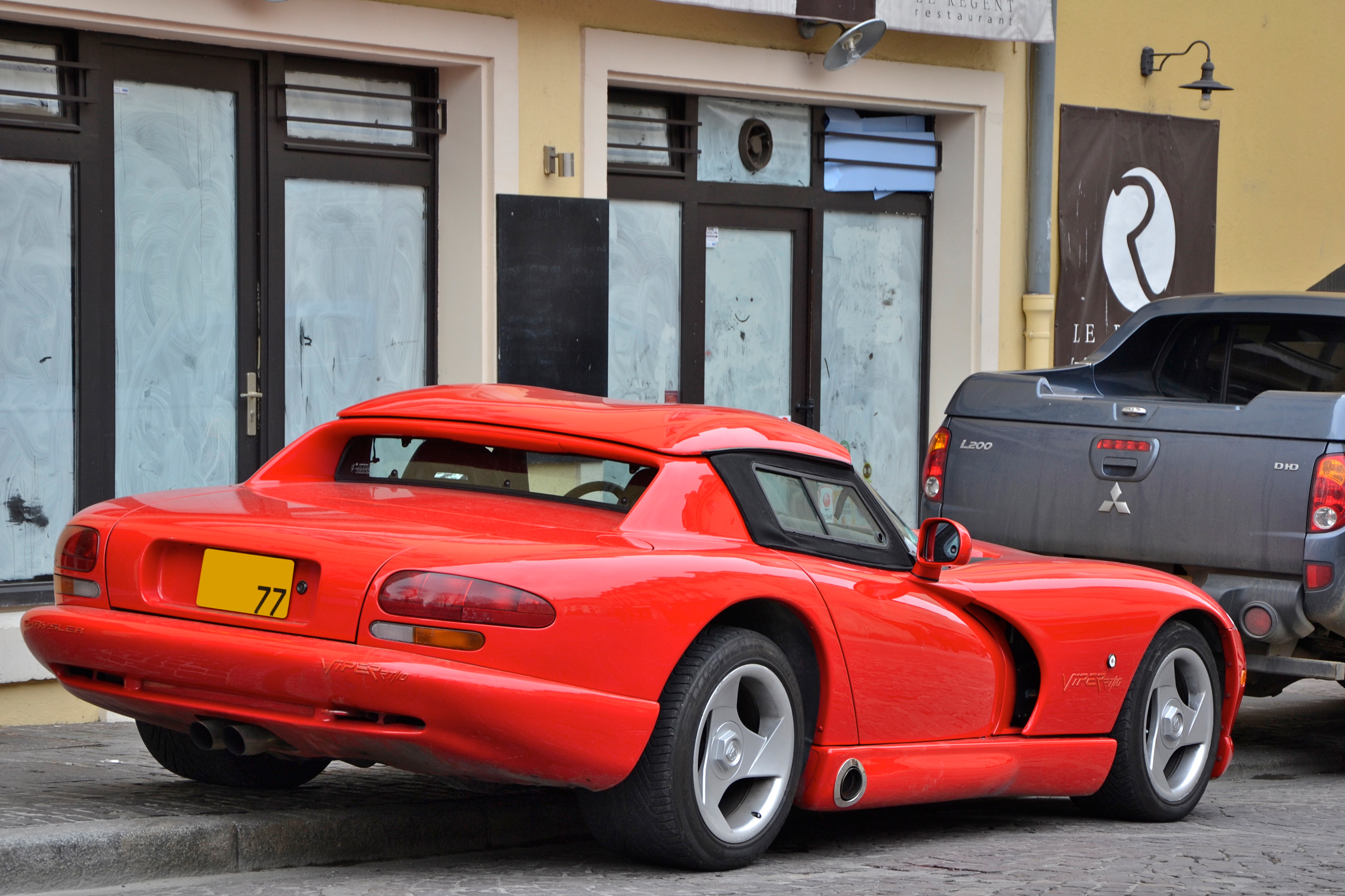
Rear view (hard top) of Chrysler version

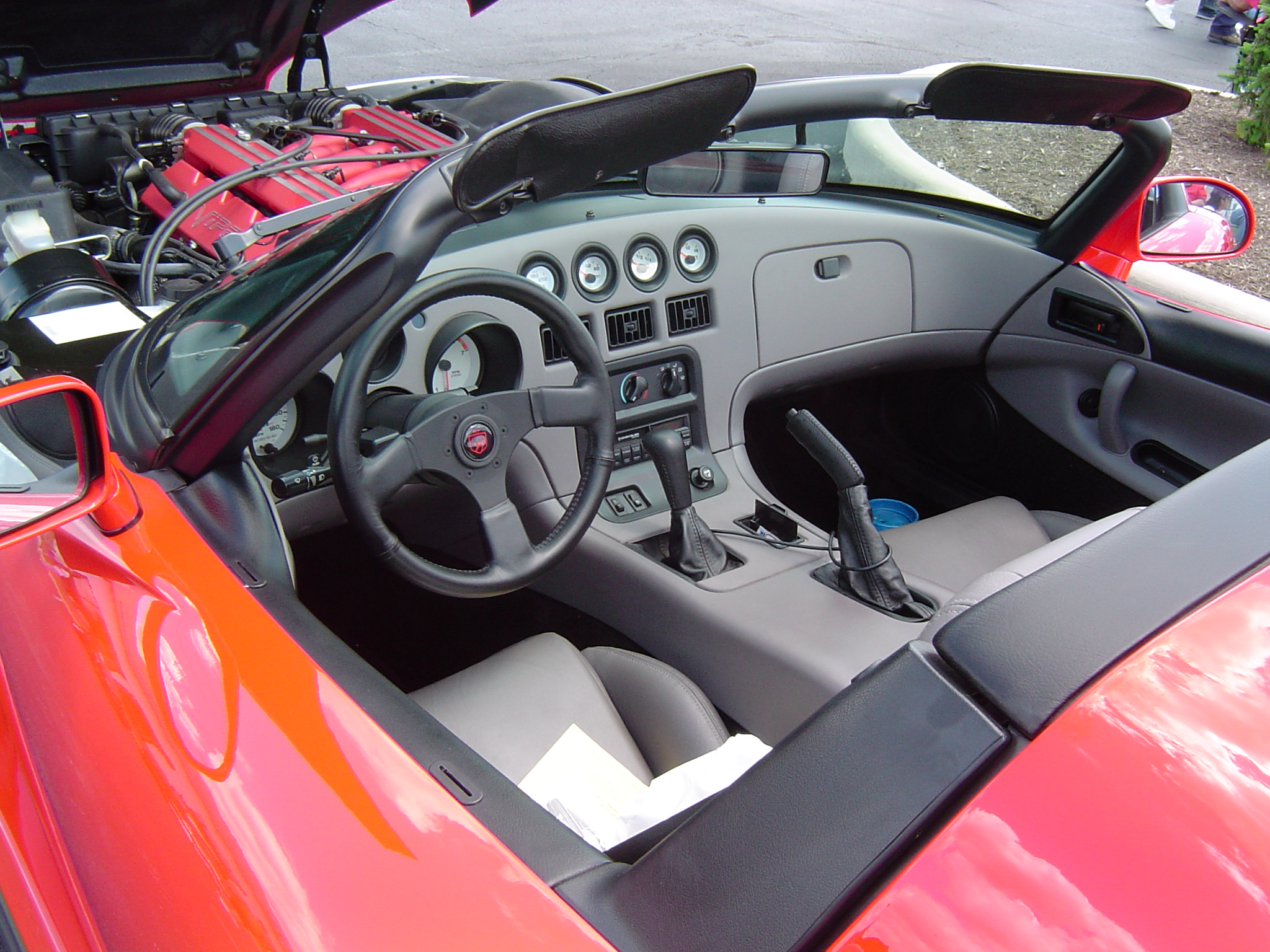
Interior

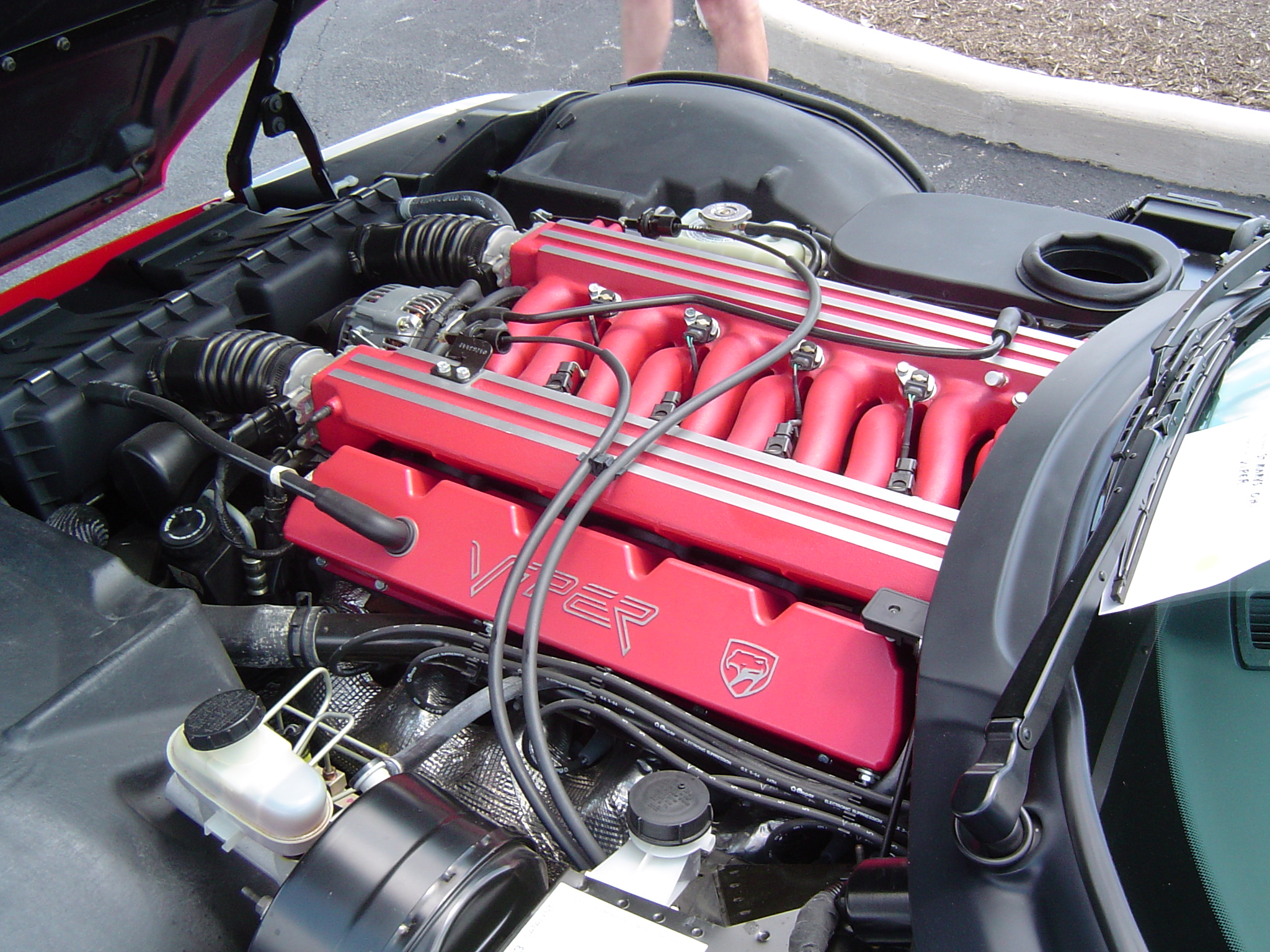
8.0-liter V10 engine
