= Rinspeed Mono Ego =

Motor vehicle

Overview
- Manufacturer: Rinspeed
- Production: 1997
- Designer: Jean-Charles de Castelbajac

Body and chassis
- Class: Concept car

Powertrain
- Engine: V8; 410 bhp (306 kW)

To celebrate 20 years of Rinspeed, Frank Rinderknecht created the 1997 Rinspeed Mono Ego. The French fashion designer Jean-Charles de Castelbajac was involved in its design. It was shown at the Geneva Motor Show. Its aluminium V8 engine, from Korean manufacturer Hyundai, has an output of 410 bhp (306 kW).
