= Rinspeed =

Swiss concept car builder

Rinspeed Inc

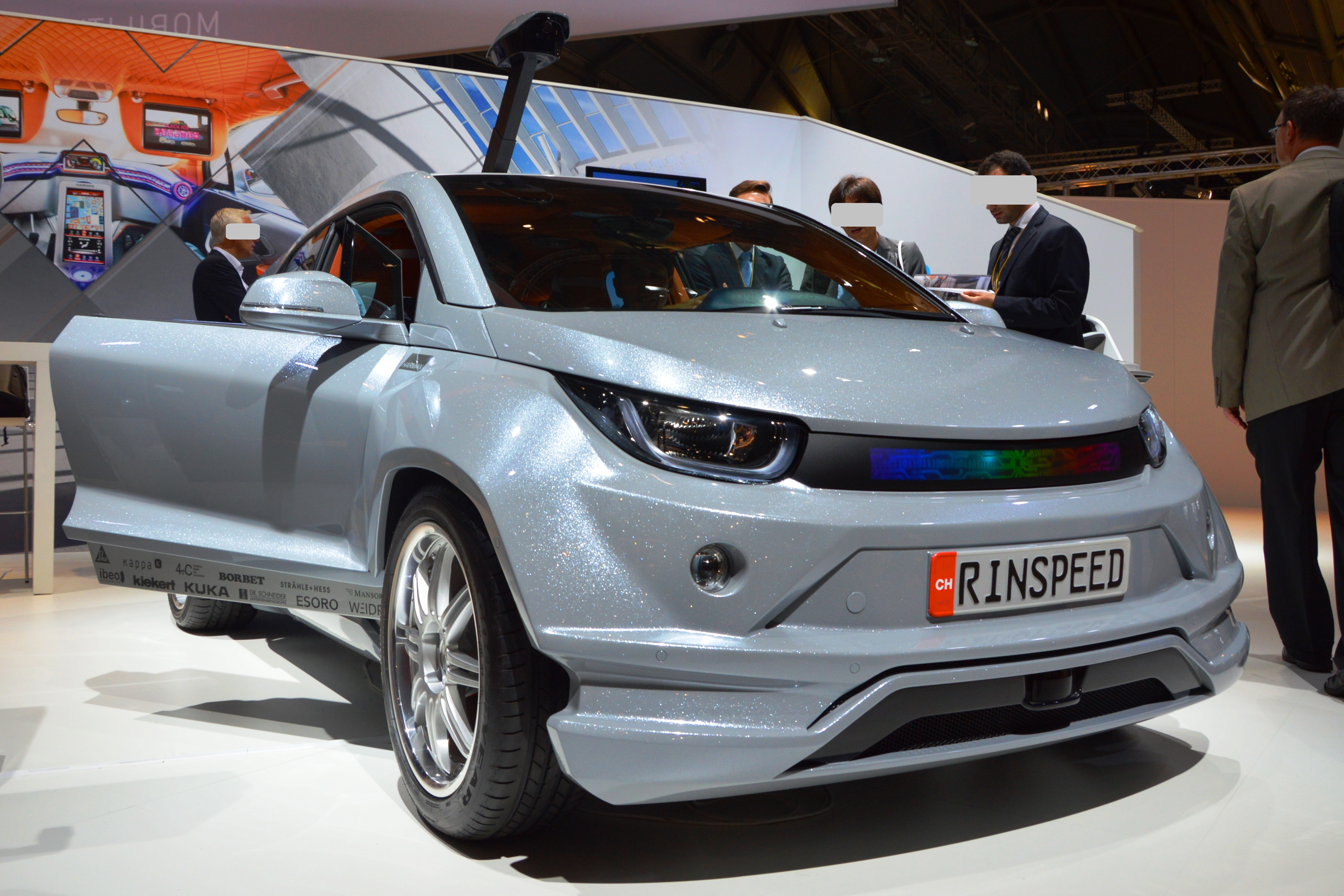
- Type: Aktiengesellschaft
- Industry: Automotive
- Founded: 1979
- Headquarters: Zumikon, Switzerland
- Key people: Frank M. Rinderknecht (Founder & CEO)
- Website: Official website

Rinspeed Inc. is a Swiss concept car manufacturer founded in 1979. Rinspeed often show their designs at CES in Las Vegas and the Geneva Motor Show.

== History ==
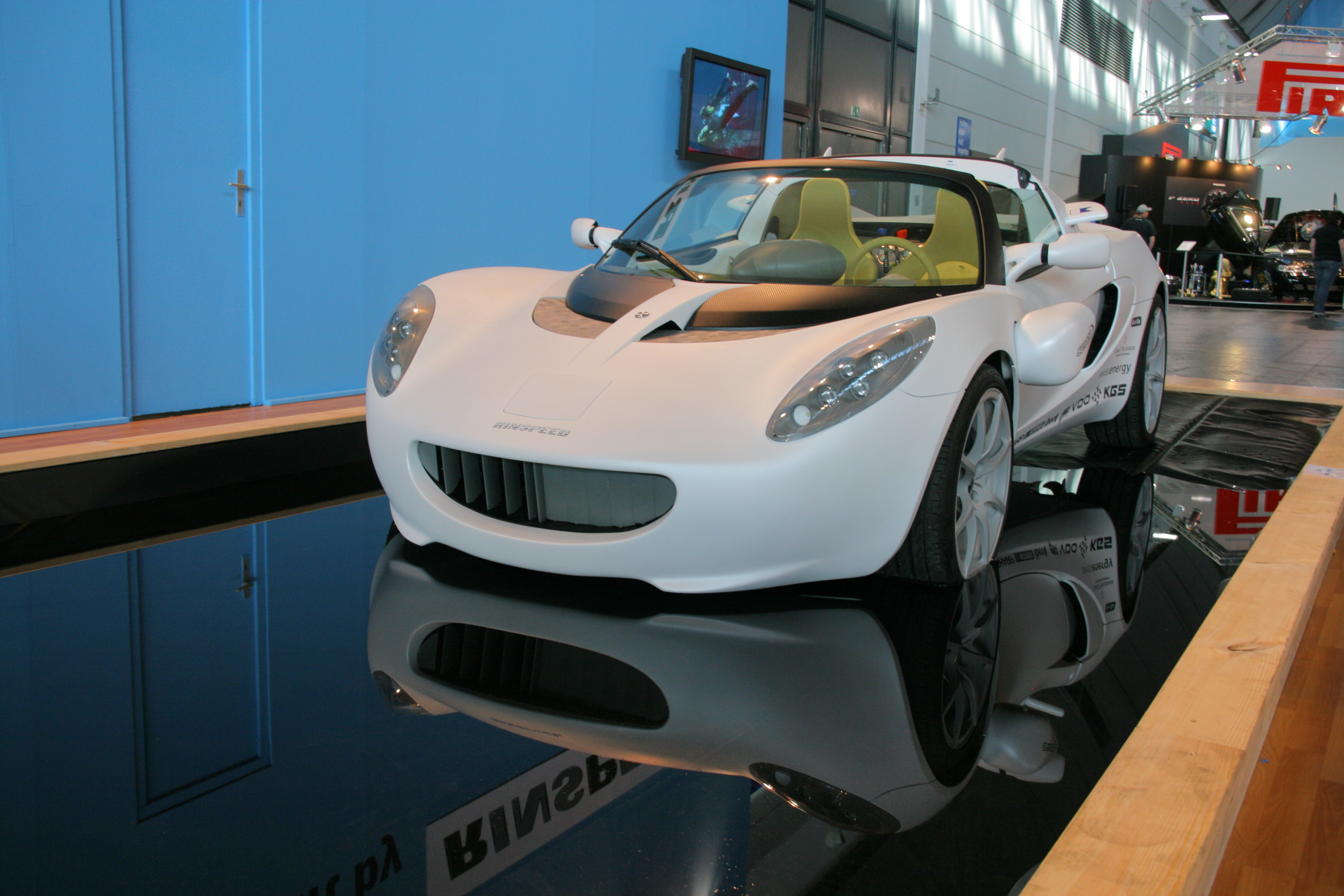
sQuba concept car at the Tuning World Bodensee 2008

Rinspeed Inc. was founded in 1979 by Frank M. Rinderknecht and by the 1980s, Rinspeed had become the exclusive Swiss importer of AMG and AC Schnitzer vehicles. Rinspeed became synonymous with launches at the Geneva Motor Show, with their first unveiling being a turbocharged, modified Volkswagen Golf GTI with squared grille and headlamps. In 1981, Rinspeed returned to the show with a more heavily modified Golf called the Aliporta, featuring gullwing doors similar to those on the DeLorean. In the following years, Rinspeed showed concept Porsche's at the Geneva Motor Show, including a heavily modified 930 Turbo known as the Rinspeed R39, at the time becoming a unique convertible 911 Turbo that was not in mainstream production and a R69 Turbo concept, a 911 Turbo coupe inspired by the Ferrari Testarossa. It is estimated that 12 of the R69s were produced.

In the early 1990s, Rinspeed collaborated with Swiss artist Rolf Knie who hand painted a horse inspired design onto a Nissan 300ZX. Alongside the art, the Nissan was heavily modified with parts from suppliers including HKS. Moving through the 1990s and 2000s, Rinspeed continued to demonstrate heavily modified and unique concept cars including futuristic aluminimum bodied sports cars such as the R Roadster, the single seat kompogas powered Advantige R1, a Bugatti EB110 called the Cyan, and a two door, low roof Porsche Cayenne.

In 2006, Rinspeed achieved the world record time for a hydrofoil crossing the English Channel utilising their Splash concept vehicle, taking 3h 14 minutes to cover 36km. Rinspeed continued with their amphibious car concepts in 2008 with the sQuba, the world's first car that can be driven both on land and underwater. Rinspeed were inspired by the 1977 James Bond film The Spy Who Loved Me. The chassis from the Lotus Elise was used as the base for the sQuba.

Moving into the 2020s, Rinspeed have begun to specialise in micro and city mobility on projects such as the microSNAP.

== Concept cars ==
- Speed-Art (1992)
- Veleno (1993)
- Cyan (1994)
- Roadster R + SC-R (1995)
- Yello Talbo (1996)
- Mono Ego (1997)
- E-Go Rocket (1998)
- X-Trem (1999)
- Tatooo.com (2000)
- Rone (2001)
- Presto (2002)
- Bedouin (2003)
- Splash (2004)
- Chopster (2005)
- Senso (2005)
- zaZen (2006)
- eXasis (2007)
- Le Mans 600 (2007)
- sQuba (2008)
- iChange (2009)
- UC? (2010)
- BamBoo (2011)
- Dock+Go (2012)
- MicroMax (2013)
- Etos (2016)
- Oasis (2017)

=== zaZen ===
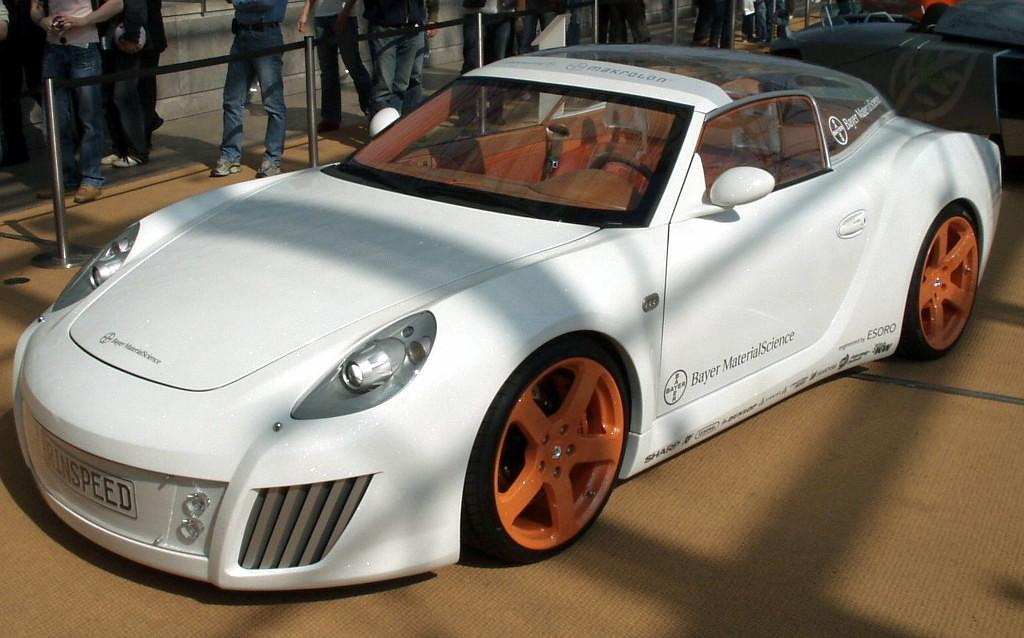
Rinspeed zaZen

The zaZen is a concept car shown for the first time at the 2006 Geneva Motor Show. It is based on the Porsche 911 (997) Carrera S platform and developed in collaboration with Bayer MaterialScience. The zaZen is powered by a flat-6 engine that has a displacement of 3,824 cc (233.4 cu in) and develops a maximum power of 355 bhp (261 kW) at 6600 rpm. The car is able to accelerate from 0 to 100 km/h (62 mph) in 4.8 seconds and reach a top speed of 182 mph (293 km/h).

=== sQuba ===
The sQuba is a concept car that can 'fly' underwater and has zero emissions. It debuted at the 2008 Geneva Motor Show, 30 years after its inspiration: the movie The Spy Who Loved Me, and is based on a Lotus Elise. The sQuba was featured in the first episode of 14th season of UK motoring show Fifth Gear.

=== Splash ===
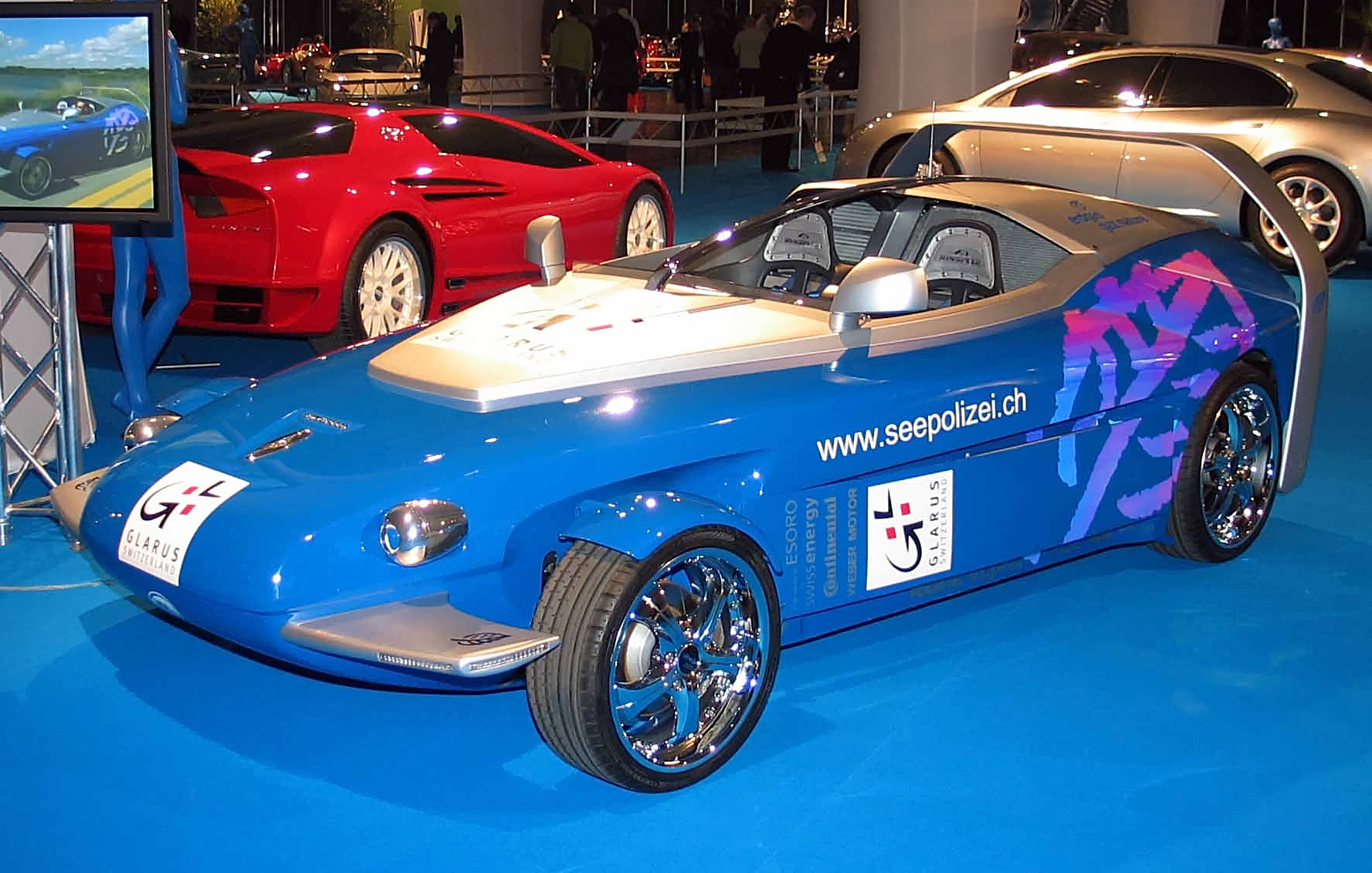
Rinspeed Splash at the 2004 Essen Motor Show

The Splash is a concept amphibious vehicle with a hydrofoil design capable of 45 knots on water or nearly 200 km/h (120 mph) on land. The concept weighs 825 kg (1,819 lb) and is propelled by a 750 cc two cylinder turbocharged engine burning natural gas which produces 140 hp (104 kW) at 7000 rpm, allowing it to accelerate from 0 to 100 km/h (62 mph) in 5.9 seconds. It premiered at the 2004 Geneva Motor Show. The Splash was featured in an episode of Top Gear. In 2006, it set a record for crossing the English Channel in a hydrofoil car, making the journey in 3 hours 14 minutes.

=== iChange ===
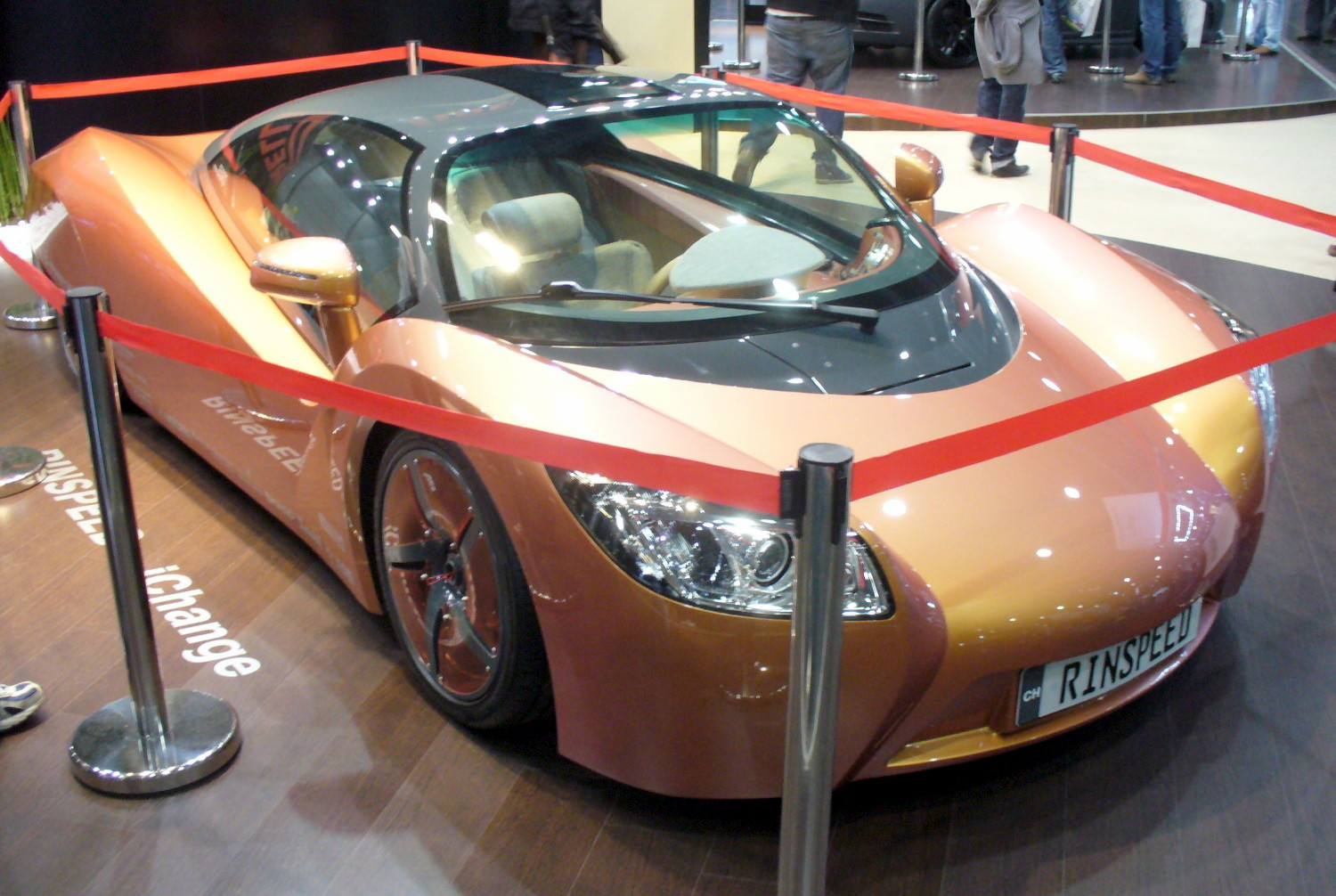
Rinspeed iChange in April 2009

The iChange is a concept car that changes shape and configuration based on the number of passengers inside, up to three. It was unveiled at the 2009 Geneva Motor Show. The car features are controlled by an Apple iPhone and it is powered by a 150 kW (201 hp) electric motor. The iChange has a 0–100 km/h (62 mph) speed of slightly over four seconds, and can hit a top speed of 136 mph (219 km/h).

=== UC ===
The UC is a micro concept electric car that was presented at the 2010 Geneva Motor Show. The name UC stands for "Urban Commuter" or "You see". It is a 2.5 metres long micro vehicle, operated with a central joystick. The electric motor delivers 130 N⋅m (96 lbf⋅ft) of torque. The concept car can reach a top speed of 120 km/h (75 mph), and on-board batteries enable the car a capable of 105 km (65 mi) range in one charge.

=== Budii ===
The Budii concept displayed at the 2015 Geneva Motor Show is worked around the future possibilities of self driven cars. Budii displays experiments to include vehicle-to-vehicle (V2V) and vehicle-to-infrastructure (V2X) radio-based communications, radar and motion sensing systems including advanced camera monitoring. It is also equipped with telescoping laser scanner on the roof called TrackView which can be raised by 70 centimeters and delivers a precise 3D perspective by combining data from all the various sensors to map the surrounding terrain.

=== Ʃtos ===
Concept Ʃtos is a concept presented in the Consumer Electronics Show in 2016. It is based on the BMW i8.

=== Oasis ===
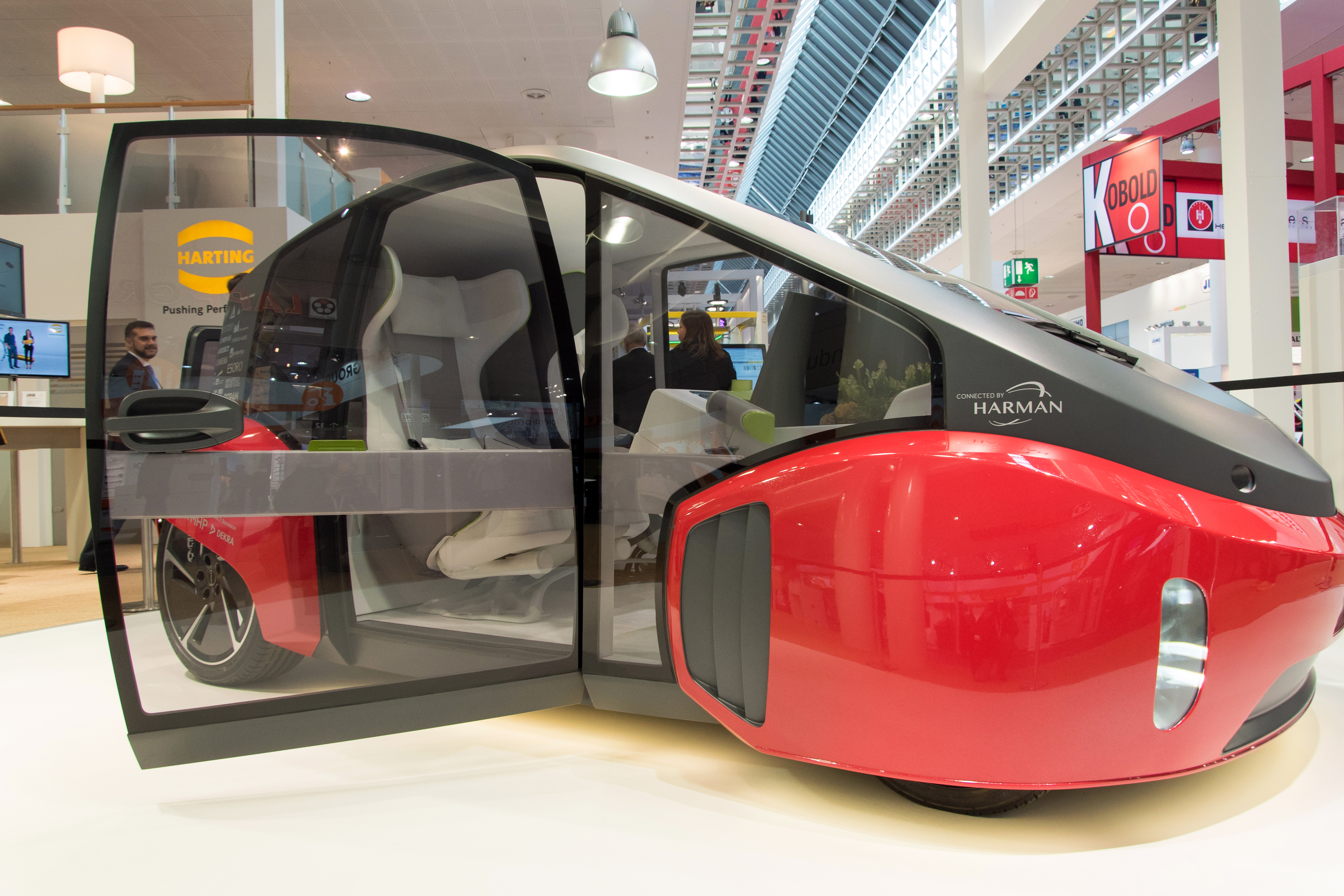
Rinspeed Oasis in 2017

Announced late in 2016 and first shown at the Consumer Electronics Show in Las Vegas in January 2017, the Oasis concept takes Rinspeed's 2015 Budii and 2016 Etos concept cars further, integrating autonomous vehicle technologies, social media, and Mobility as a Service into a compact car described as a "living room" on wheels. It also features floor to ceiling glass doors, a battery-electric engine, retractable steering wheel, solar panels integrated into the roof, and an augmented reality display. An unusual feature, for a car, is the dash-mounted garden with sensors to advise the user when to feed the plants. It was also shown at the Detroit Motor Show. Partners on the project included Kostal (electronics), Harman (electronic controls), and WayRay (infotainment system), among a wide range of other firms.
