= Rinspeed Le Mans 600 =

The Rinspeed Le Mans 600 is a rear-engined sportscar built by Rinspeed and based on the Porsche 997 911 Turbo.

== Model Information ==
Released in 2007, the Le Mans sports a new front fascia, a large rear wing, reshaped air intakes, modified side skirts, reshaped rear valance, new daytime driving lights, 20 inch Rinspeed aluminum wheels and carbon fiber in the mirrors. The Le Mans also features upgraded brakes with 8 piston calipers in front and 6 piston in the rear, and an adjustable suspension system developed with the help of Bilstein. As for power, the 600 receives revised turbochargers, a carbon air intake system with sport air filters, and improved intercoolers and exhaust system. These modifications boost the power rating of the Le Mans 600 from a stock 358 kW (480 hp) on the 911 Turbo to 448 kW (600 hp) at 6,700 rpm, and torque from 620 N·m (457 lbf-ft) to 800 N·m (590 lbf-ft) at 4,000 rpm. The Le Mans can accelerate from 0-100 km/h (62 mph) in 3.3 seconds, 0-200 km/h (124 mph) in 10.9 seconds and reportedly reach a top speed of 343 km/h (213 mph).
