= Rinspeed Yello Talbo =

Yello Talbo
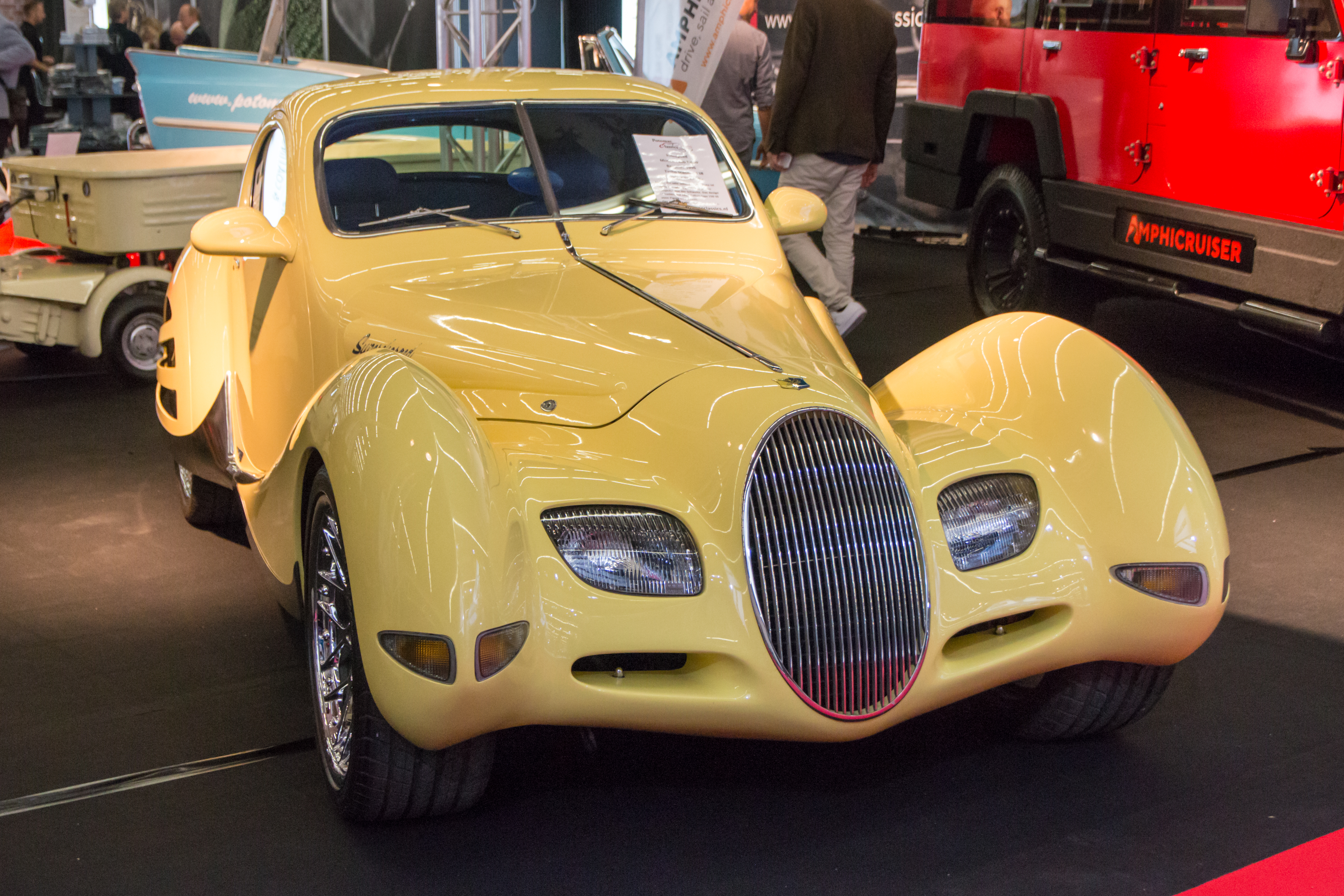
- Yello Talbo at IAA 2019

Overview
- Manufacturer: Rinspeed
- Production: 1996

Body and chassis
- Class: Sports car
- Body style: Coupé
- Layout: Front engine, rear-wheel drive

Powertrain
- Engine: 5.0 litre V8 Otto (235 kW)
- Transmission: Automatic gearbox

The Rinspeed Yello Talbo is a Swiss sports car produced by Rinspeed in association with Dieter Meier and Boris Blank of the eclectic electronic group Yello. It debuted at the Geneva Motor Show in 1996.

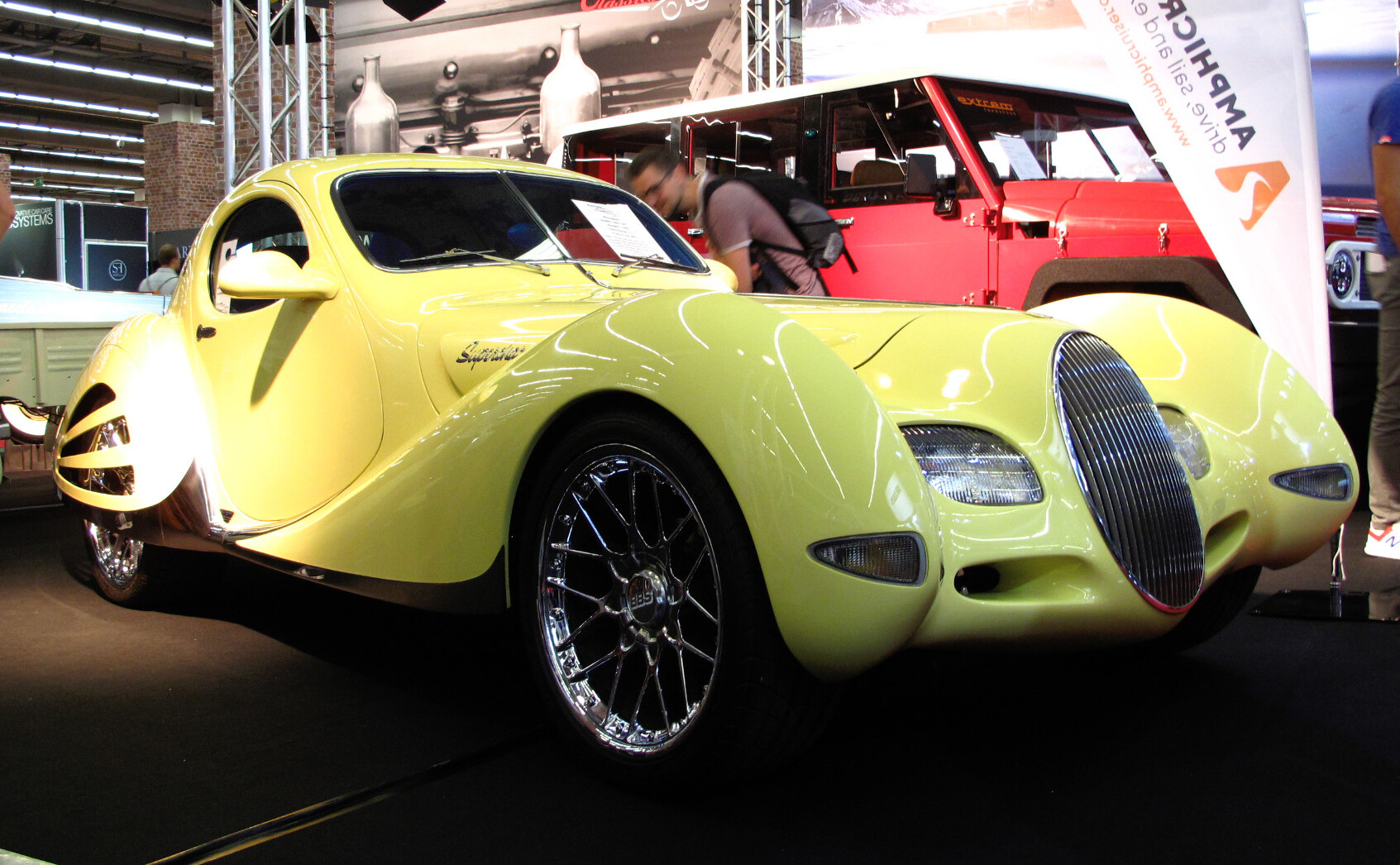
Yello Talbo at IAA 2019

The car has nostalgic design cues, taking inspiration from designs of the late 1930s, and more specifically taking inspiration from a 1938 Talbot-Lago SS by Figoni & Falaschi. The Yello Talbo is powered by a supercharged 5.0L V8-engine producing 320 hp (239 kW) and coupled to an automatic gearbox. This allows it to accelerate from 0–100 km/h (0–62 mph) in 5.5 seconds.
