= Rinspeed Veleno =

Overview
- Manufacturer: Rinspeed
- Production: 1993
- Designer: Frank Rinderknecht

Body and chassis
- Class: Concept car
- Body style: 2-door roadster
- Related: Dodge Viper

Powertrain
- Engine: 8.0-liter (488.1 cu in) odd-firing Viper EWA V10

The Rinspeed Veleno was a heavily modified Dodge Viper built by Rinspeed, that debuted in 1993 at the Geneva Motor Show.

The Veleno was fitted with an electronically controlled nitrous-oxide injection system, which increased power from the Viper's 400 bhp (298 kW), to 550 bhp (410 kW) and increase torque from 630 N⋅m (465 lb⋅ft) to 820 N⋅m (605 lbf⋅ft). On the exterior, the Veleno features a viper green paint job, 3 piece OZ Racing wheels fitted with Pirelli PZero tires, new front lip, modified rear roll protection with an integrated spoiler, windshield frame mounted rear view mirrors, and integrated rear lower lights. On the interior, the Veleno features Vinerus upholstery in place of the original leather, green painted instrument panel and center console, integrated Alpine CD changer and a Nokia 121 cellular phone.
