= WayRay =

Technology company

- Type: Private
- Industry: Automotive
- Founded: 2012; 14 years ago
- Defunct: 2023
- Fate: bankrupt
- Headquarters: Zürich, Switzerland
- Number of locations: Moscow, Russia
- Key people: Vitaly Ponomarev, Philippe Monnier
- Products: Augmented_reality
- Number of employees: 0
- Website: http://wayray.com/

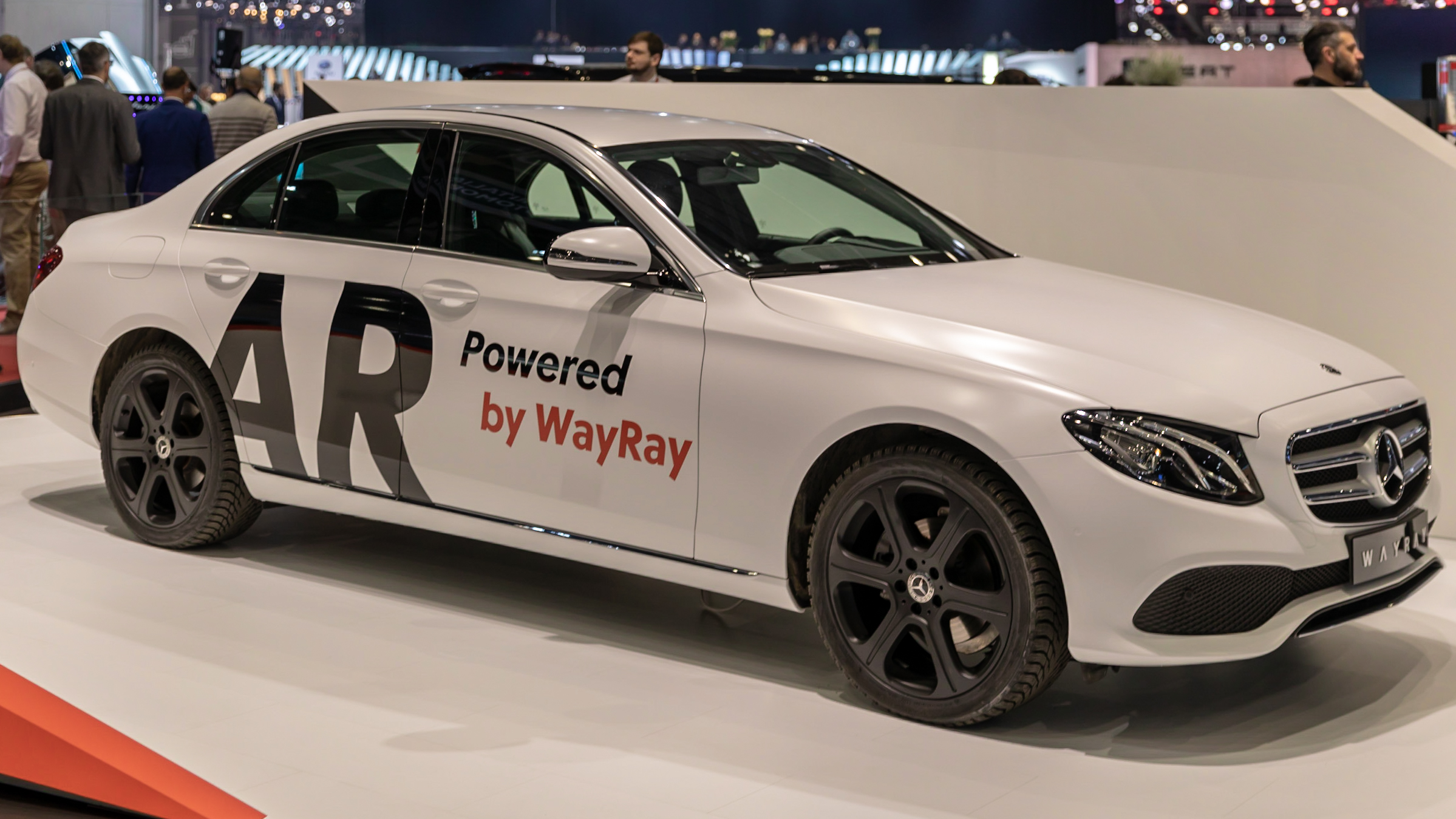
WayRay AR demonstrator at Geneva International Motor Show 2019

WayRay was a Russian start-up with offices in Switzerland and Russia. It developed holographic AR technologies for connected cars.

With effect of 14 August 2023, the Zurich probate court declared the bankruptcy of the WayRay AG, Switzerland. The company's assets have been officially liquidated since this date.

== History ==
According to Vitaly Ponomarev, company's founder, the idea of a device that projects navigational information on the windshield of the car came to him after the accident into which he got when he was distracted by the GPS navigator. The concept was gradually supplemented by social network and augmented reality. By December 2011, the idea became a project of a portable collimator to be installed on a car's front panel. Using a thin holographic film on the windshield instead of a mirror system made it possible to reduce the dimensions of the device. In the spring of 2012, the device was presented for the first time.

In October 2013, WayRay took the prize at the Intel Global Challenge, UC Berkeley, California, and the following month got shortlisted as a finalist at Slush, a startup competition in Helsinki, Finland.

In November 2017, at the LA Auto Show, WayRay was selected as the grand prize winner of the 2017 Top Ten Automotive Startups Competition.

WayRay's achievements have been covered by various media: in 2013, Business Insider magazine listed WayRay among the 11 Hottest Startups in Northern Europe; in 2017, Wired magazine included WayRay in the Top 10 Startups Racing to Remake The Auto Industry. Later in 2018, VentureBeat named the company one of “7 promising tech startups shaking up the auto industry.”

== Investments ==
Initial capital of WayRay was 300,000 USD of personal and borrowed funds of the founder, which was aimed at designing electronics and developing a chemical formula of the film, later ordered at DuPont.

In 2017, the Chinese internet giant Alibaba Group led an $18 million Series B round. In September 2018, the company raised another $80 million in Series C round led by Porsche. As of then, WayRay had a valuation of $500 million.

== Developments ==
The company had announced several development projects in the field of augmented reality for the automotive industry:

- Deep Reality Display was supposed to be a new generation of WayRay's True AR HUD where different parts of the virtual image can appear at different distances.
- Holograktor was supposed to be a ride-sharing concept car from Swiss deep-tech with its True AR HUD. The WayRay Holograktor EV would have run three separate “Real Augmented Reality” holographic displays, with one for each of its three occupants.
- True AR SDK was an augmented reality development framework for third-party developers which allows building AR apps for cars. These apps would have been able to run on holographic AR displays and complemented the native AR interface.

In November 2017 WayRay won the grand prize in the Top Ten Automotive Startups Competition at LA Auto Show. In addition to the prize money, the company was granted other perks from companies represented among panel judges. Those perks included access to Microsoft Azure cloud infrastructure, a new Nvidia Drive PX 2 AI computer and access to Elektrobit's software network for automated driving and consulting services from Porsche Consulting.

In January 2018, the CES-2018 company showed off its Navion navigation system for the first time. Also at CES, WayRay demonstrated its development platform True AR SDK, which was created to allow others to build augmented reality apps for automobiles. In February 2018, the company announced a new competition seeking developers for its True SDK Challenge, a competition to create AR applications for cars.

In November 2021 WayRay launched its own Holograktor car to showcase the holographic technology.

== Automotive collaborations ==
WayRay's business model included both retail sales Navion Navigator and OEM-contracts with automakers on the supply of AR-system. In December 2015, the company announced a partnership agreement with the French provider of telecommunications services, Orange Business Services, under which it would have provided wireless connection and maintenance of WayRay products in the US.

In January 2017, at the CES-2017 Consumer Electronics Show in Las Vegas, the company announced a strategic partnership with the US automotive electronics manufacturer Harman International Industries and the planned introduction of WayRay technologies into Harman's solutions for automakers. The autonomous concept car Oasis of the Swiss company Rinspeed was presented at the exhibition. It is equipped with the infotainment system with augmented reality developed by WayRay.

Banma Technologies, a joint venture between Alibaba Group and Chinese auto concern SAIC Motor, was a WayRay's partner which worked with carmakers on its behalf.

At Startup Autobahn 2018, Europe's largest innovation platform initiated by Daimler AG and Plug and Play, WayRay announced its joint pilot project with the German automobile manufacturer Porsche and took home the People's Choice Award and the prize in the AR/VR category. The company also cooperated with a number of automakers.

== Links ==
- Official website
