= 1955 in science =

The year 1955 in science and technology included many events, some of which are listed below.

== Astronomy and space sciences ==
- January 8 – Penumbral lunar eclipse.
- June
  - Fred Hoyle and Martin Schwarzschild describe the mechanism for the creation of red giant stars.
  - The first evidence for existence of a magnetosphere of Jupiter, a record of decametric radio emission (DAM) with a spectrum extending up to 40 MHz, is published.
- June 5 – Penumbral lunar eclipse.
- June 20 – Total solar eclipse of 7 min 8 sec duration, the longest between the 11th and 22nd centuries, visible in Southeast Asia. During the entire Second Millennium, only seven such eclipses exceed seven minutes of totality.
- August – The United States Department of Defense approves Project Vanguard to launch a satellite.
- November 29 – Partial lunar eclipse.
- December 14 – Annular solar eclipse.
- Jan Oort confirms that polarized light from the Crab Nebula is produced by synchrotron radiation.

== Biochemistry ==
- February 26 – Rosalind Franklin publishes her observation that tobacco mosaic virus rods are all of identical length.
- December 22 – Cytogeneticist Joe Hin Tjio working with Albert Levan at Lund University demonstrates that there are forty-six human chromosomes.
- Edmond H. Fischer and Edwin G. Krebs discover reversible protein phosphorylation.
- Heinz Fraenkel-Conrat shows that a virus consists of an infective RNA core and a non-infective protein coat; and with Robley C. Williams assembles a functional tobacco mosaic virus from purified versions of these components.
- Avian influenza is confirmed to be caused by Influenza A virus.
- Severo Ochoa develops enzymes that cause nucleic acid bases to form RNA.
- James F. Bonner and Paul Ts'o isolate mitochondria from cells.

== Chemistry ==
- January 11 – Lloyd Conover is granted a patent for tetracycline in the United States.
- February 19 – Mendelevium (atomic number 101) is first synthesized by Albert Ghiorso, Glenn T. Seaborg, Gregory R. Choppin, Bernard G. Harvey, and Stanley G. Thompson (team leader) at the University of California, Berkeley.
- August 20 – Dorothy Hodgkin and colleagues publish the structure of vitamin B_{12}.
- Diquat's properties as a contact herbicide are recognized at the Imperial Chemical Industries laboratories at Jealott's Hill in England.
- Renewable ion-exchange resin cartridges for water softening and purification are used in a device by Walter F. Lorch.

== Climatology ==
- August 9 – Gilbert Plass submits his seminal article "The Carbon Dioxide Theory of Climate Change".

== Computer science ==
- October 2 (11:45 p.m.) – The ENIAC computer is deactivated at Aberdeen Proving Ground, Maryland, having been in continuous operation since 1947.
- Former Luftwaffe flying ace Ulrich Steinhilper, a German IBM typewriter salesman, coins and popularizes the term "Textverarbeitung" ("word processing").
- Maurice Wilkes publishes a description of microprogramming in Electrical Engineering.
- RAND publishes A Million Random Digits with 100,000 Normal Deviates.

== Earth sciences ==
- American geophysicist Clair Cameron Patterson presents his result for the age of the Earth using lead isotopic data from the Canyon Diablo meteorite – 4.55 billion years (± 70 million).

== History of science and technology ==
- October – The term "Industrial archaeology" is popularised.

== Mathematics ==
- July – Statistician David Cox publishes the Cox process.
- In the classification of finite simple groups, the Brauer–Fowler theorem is published and Claude Chevalley introduces Chevalley groups.
- Gilbert–Shannon–Reeds model for probability distribution of riffle shuffle permutations in shuffling playing cards reported.
- Peter Hilton starts work with Beno Eckmann and Karol Borsuk on what becomes known as Eckmann-Hilton duality for the homotopy category, a key driver in homological algebra.
- Klaus Roth publishes Roth's theorem on the Diophantine approximation of algebraic numbers.
- The Taniyama–Shimura conjecture is first stated by Yutaka Taniyama at an international symposium in Japan.

== Pharmacology ==
- The first benzodiazepine, chlordiazepoxide (Librium), is synthesized by Leo Sternbach at Hoffmann-La Roche, although its properties are not recognized at this time.

== Physics ==
- February – Harold Hopkins and Narinder Singh Kapany publish a key paper in the development of optical fiber technology.
- March – Joseph Rotblat publishes his conclusions that contamination caused by nuclear fallout after the U.S. Castle Bravo hydrogen bomb test at Bikini Atoll is greater than officially stated.
- October – Ultra high frequency AN/FPS-31 early warning radar developed by Lincoln Laboratory begins operation on Jug Handle Hill at West Bath, Maine.
- October 11 – Erwin Müller and Kanwar Bahadur are the first people to observe individual atoms, using Müller's field ion microscope.
- November 29 – The nuclear reactor core of Experimental Breeder Reactor I near Arco, Idaho, suffers a partial meltdown during a coolant flow test.
- Emmett Leith's work on synthetic-aperture radar leads to the development of holography.
- Existence of the antiproton is experimentally confirmed by University of California, Berkeley, physicists Emilio Segrè and Owen Chamberlain.
- Enrico Fermi, John Pasta, Stanisław Ulam and Mary Tsingou numerically study a nonlinear spring model of heat conduction and discover solitary wave type behavior.
- Murray Gell-Mann and Abraham Pais investigate neutral kaon mixing.
- Luis Walter Alvarez develops the design of a liquid hydrogen bubble chamber.
- University of Liverpool cyclotron and Lawrence Berkeley National Laboratory synchrotron begin operation.

== Physiology and medicine ==
- April 12 – The Salk polio vaccine, having passed large-scale trials earlier in the United States, receives full approval by the Food and Drug Administration.
- December 24 – Henry K. Beecher publishes a paper indicating the powerful effect of placebos on patient outcomes.
- Outbreak of "Royal Free disease" or "benign myalgic encephalomyelitis", strongly resembling what will later be known as chronic fatigue syndrome, among staff at the Royal Free Hospital in London.
- G. I. M. Swyer first describes XY gonadal dysgenesis.
- First reported mitral valve replacement, by Judson Chesterman of Sheffield (England).
- Hemolytic–uremic syndrome is first described by Conrad Gasser.

== Technology ==
- January 5 – Strömsund Bridge in Sweden completed, the first significant cable-stayed bridge of the modern era.
- July 17 – The first atomic-generated electrical power is sold commercially, partially powering Arco, Idaho, from the U.S. National Reactor Testing Station; on July 18, Schenectady, New York, receives power from a prototype nuclear submarine reactor at Knolls Atomic Power Laboratory.
- August 24 – The first accurate atomic clock, a caesium standard based on a certain transition of the caesium-133 atom, is built by Louis Essen with J. V. L. Parry at the National Physical Laboratory (United Kingdom).
- December 12 – Christopher Cockerell is granted a United Kingdom patent for his design of hovercraft.
- Swiss electrical engineer George de Mestral is granted a patent for the Velcro fabric hook-and-loop fastener.
- Tappan introduce the first domestic microwave oven, in the United States.
- American electrical engineer Eugene Polley invents the Zenith Flash-Matic, the first wireless television remote control.

== Zoology ==
- French zoologist Bernard Heuvelmans publishes On the Track of Unknown Animals (Sur la piste des bêtes ignorées), pioneering the pseudoscientific field of cryptozoology.

== Events ==
- July 9 – Russell–Einstein Manifesto issued in London by Bertrand Russell with the signatures of the late Albert Einstein, Max Born and other prominent scientists drawing the attention of world political leaders to the dangers posed by nuclear weapons.

== Publications ==
- Eugene Garfield proposes the concept of citation indexing for scientific literature.

== Awards ==
- Nobel Prizes
  - Physics – Willis Eugene Lamb, Polykarp Kusch
  - Chemistry – Vincent du Vigneaud
  - Medicine – Axel Hugo Theodor Theorell
- Copley Medal (Royal Society of London) – Ronald Fisher
- Wollaston Medal (Geological Society of London) – A. E. Trueman

== Births ==
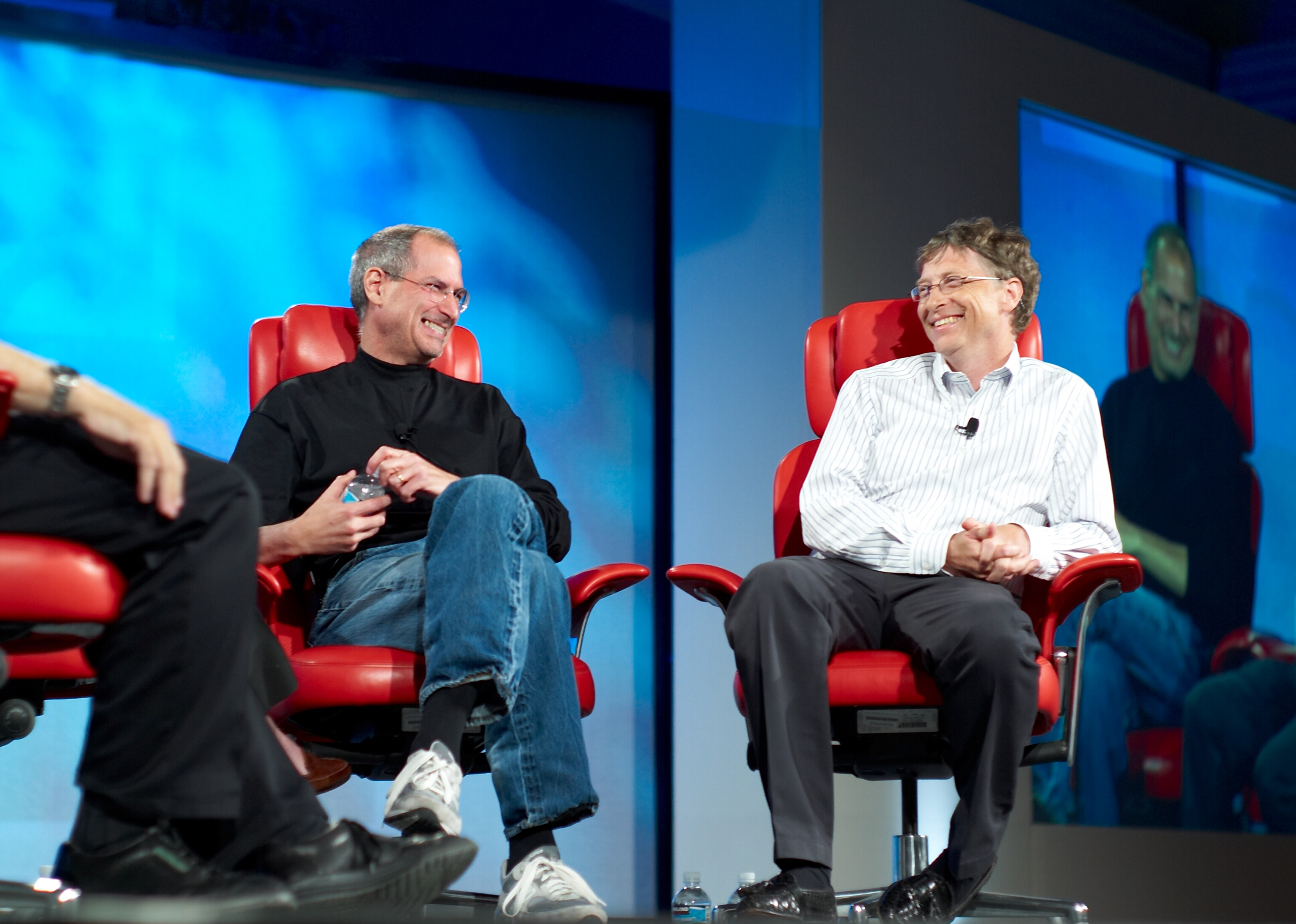
Steve Jobs and Bill Gates

- January 1 – Simon Schaffer, English historian of science.
- January 6 – Susan B. Horwitz (died 2014), American computer scientist and academic.
- January 17 – Katalin Karikó, Hungarian-born biochemist, winner of the 2023 Nobel Prize in Physiology or Medicine.
- January 24 – Alan Sokal, American mathematical physicist and proponent of scientific objectivity.
- February 3 – Sue Ion, born Susan Burrows, English nuclear scientist.
- February 24 – Steve Jobs (died 2011), American computing entrepreneur.
- April 11 – Piers Sellers (died 2016), English-born astronaut and climate scientist.
- April 20 – Svante Pääbo, Swedish evolutionary geneticist, winner of the 2022 Nobel Prize in Physiology or Medicine.
- April 30 – Francis Muguet (died 2009), French chemist and advocate of open access to information.
- May 8 – Pat Hanrahan, American computer scientist.
- May 30 – Jacqueline McGlade, British-born marine biologist and pioneer of environmental informatics.
- June 8 – Tim Berners-Lee, English creator of the World Wide Web.
- June 11 – Duncan Steel, English/Australasian space scientist.
- October 2 – Nancy Rothwell, English physiologist.
- October 28 – Bill Gates, American software designer and entrepreneur.
- November 4 – David Julius, American physiologist, winner of the 2021 Nobel Prize in Physiology or Medicine.
- December 22 – Thomas C. Südhof, German-born biochemist, winner of the 2013 Nobel Prize in Physiology or Medicine.
- Luis Álvarez-Gaumé, Spanish theoretical physicist.

== Deaths ==
- February 2 – Oswald Avery (born 1877), Canadian-American bacteriologist.
- March 11 – Sir Alexander Fleming (born 1881), British bacteriologist, winner of the 1945 Nobel Prize in Physiology or Medicine.
- March 15 – Michele Besso (born 1873), Swiss engineer, confidant of Einstein.
- April 10 – Pierre Teilhard de Chardin, SJ (born 1881), French-born paleontologist and philosopher.
- April 17 – Eduard Pernkopf (born 1888), Austrian anatomist.
- April 18 – Albert Einstein (born 1879), German-born theoretical physicist, winner of the 1921 Nobel Prize in Physics.
- April 20 – Tirukkannapuram Vijayaraghavan (born 1902), Indian mathematician.
- June 12 – Redcliffe N. Salaman (born 1874), English botanist.
- July 21 – J. B. Christopherson (born 1868), English physician.
- August 11 – Robert W. Wood (born 1868), American optical physicist.
- August 12 – James B. Sumner (born 1887), American biochemist, winner of the 1946 Nobel Prize in Chemistry.
- November 25 – Sir Arthur Tansley (born 1871), English botanist and ecologist.
- December 13 – Antonio Egas Moniz (born 1874), Portuguese neurologist, winner of the 1949 Nobel Prize in Physiology or Medicine.
