= TSO =

TSO may refer to:

== Science and technology ==
- Transmission system operator, an entity involved in transmission of electric power or natural gas
- Technical Standard Order, a minimum performance standard issued by the FAA for certain items used on civil aircraft
- Trichuris suis, a species of whipworm, a parasite of pigs

=== Computing ===
- Total store order, in memory ordering
- Time Sharing Option, an interactive command line interpreter for IBM mainframe operating systems OS/360, SVS, MVS, OS/390 and z/OS
- TCP segmentation offloading, a technique for increasing outbound throughput of high-bandwidth network connections

== Music ==
- Taipei Symphony Orchestra
- Tasmanian Symphony Orchestra
- Tehran Symphony Orchestra
- The Summer Obsession
- Tokyo Symphony Orchestra
- Toledo Symphony Orchestra
- Toronto Symphony Orchestra
- Trans-Siberian Orchestra
- Tucson Symphony Orchestra

== Transportation ==
- Tourist Standard Open, a type of British Railways loco-hauled coach
- Trailer Standard Open, a type of British Railways coach
- Marcos TSO, a sports car manufactured by Marcos Engineering Ltd
- Transportation security officer, a federal employee of the Transportation Security Administration, a division of the U.S. Department of Homeland Security
- Transaero Airlines, a former Russian airline (ICAO code: TSO)
- Tresco Heliport, a former heliport in the Scilly islands (IATA code: TSO)

== Other uses ==
- Threefold social order, a sociological theory involving the relationship of economy, polity and culture
- The Sims Online, a massively multiplayer game
- The Stationery Office, a British publisher
- Total shares outstanding, the stock held by investors, including restricted shares, as well as those held by the public; see Shares outstanding

== See also ==
- Tso (disambiguation)
