= Tso =

Tso or tso may refer to:

- Tso or Ts'o, several Chinese surnames (e.g., Cao) in dialect or Wade–Giles romanization, which may refer to:
  - Zuo Zongtang, or General Tso (左宗棠)
  - Paul Ts'o (1929–2009), Hong Kong-born biophysical chemist
  - Theodore Ts'o (born 1968), an American software developer mainly known for his contributions to the Linux kernel
- Tso language, a Savanna language of eastern Nigeria
- Tsonga language (ISO 639-2 & ISO 639-3 codes: tso)
- Ts'o, letter of the Armenian alphabet

== See also ==
- TSO (disambiguation)
