= Ilya B. Tsyrlov =

Ilya Tsyrlov
- Born: Ilya Borisovich Tsyrlov
- Education: Novosibirsk State Medical Academy; Russian Academy of Sciences
- Known for: research on metabolism and health effects of dioxins
- Scientific career
- Fields: Biomedical sciences; Environmental toxicology
- Workplaces: Russian Academy of Sciences; National Cancer Institute/NIH; Icahn School of Medicine at Mount Sinai
- Thesis: Drug-Metabolizing Enzyme Systems of Normal and Cirrhotic Liver (1973); “Induction by Xenobiotics and Functional Peculiarity of Membrane-Bound Monooxygenases”. (1983)

Ilya Borisovich Tsyrlov is a Russian-American biochemist, molecular toxicologist and virologist. He is known for his studies and research on enzymology, drug metabolism, environmental toxicology, bioinformatics, virology, and cancer. Tsyrlov has authored 4 monographs, and co-authored over 280 publications on microsomal, purified and recombinant monooxygenases, and mechanisms of CYP induction by xenobiotics.

== Education and career ==
Tsyrlov graduated in 1970 from Novosibirsk State Medical Academy, USSR, and received a PhD degree in biochemistry from the same institution (1973). In 1983 Tsyrlov earned higher Doctor of Sciences degree (biochemistry) from the Institute of Experimental Medicine, Russian Academy of Sciences. He held various positions at Institute of Molecular Biology and Biophysics in Russian Academy of Sciences, including head of laboratory and chair of the Department of Xenobiochemistry. In 1990, the US National Institutes of Health (NIH) hired him for a position of a senior enzymologist at the Laboratory of Molecular Carcinogenesis (headed by Harry Gelboin), National Cancer Institute. Since 1994 he held positions of research associate professor/professor/visiting professor at the Department of Medicine, Mount Sinai School of Medicine (Icahn School of Medicine at Mount Sinai), New York, NY.

In 2005, Tsyrlov founded Xenotox, Inc, a life sciences consulting company implementing an earlier discovered site-directed synthesis of long-acting drugs, and studying the transactivation of the human herpesviruses by body burden dioxins. He was elected an emeritus member of International Society for Study of Xenobiotics (ISSX). Dr. Tsyrlov has lectured and keynoted at research seminars and conferences on many occasions.

== Research ==
Tsyrlov used protonophores and probes affecting arachidonic acid of phospholipids in endoplasmic reticulum to show different compartmentalized hydrobobic clusters coupled with substrate-binding and electron-accepting moieties of membrane bound cytochrome P450 (CYP). Following up discovery of mechanism for “phenobarbital-type” induction of CYP2B6 and applicability of induced-fit hypothesis for membrane-bound enzymes, Tsyrlov with Konstantin Gerasimov prioritized method how to convert first-line antipyretic and antimalarial medicines into their long-acting forms. Tsyrlov and Dmitry Oshchepkov revealed numerous DREs in genes encoding XAP2 and HSP90AA1 chaperone proteins complexing with ligand-free cytoplasmic Ah-receptor. Tsyrlov also conducted research on cDNA-expressed mammalian CYPs as preferred tests for major medical conditions. Tsyrlov revealed that human CYP1A2 is the catalyst of ethanol and uroporphyrinogen oxidation. Tsyrlov and Andrey Pokrovsky discovered TCDD ability to increase HIV-1 reverse transcriptase activity, HIV-1 p24 antigen, and augment HIV-1-LTR CAT construct in HIV-1-infected CD4+ cells, all mediated via the AhR/(bHLH)/Per-Arnt-Sim transcriptional pathway, which thereafter has been shown to involve in trans-activation of some human herpesviruses.

== Selected publications ==
- Tsyrlov, I.B., Gromova, O.A., Lyakhovich, V.V. (October 1976). “Mechanism of inhibition by carbonyl cyanide m-chlorophenylhydrozone and sodium deoxycholate of cytochrome P-450-catalyzed hepatic microsomal drug metabolism”. The Biochemical Journal. 160(1):75-83. DOI:10.1042/bj1600075
- Tsyrlov, I.B., Zakharova-Polyakova, N.E., Gromova, O.A., Pospelova, L.N., Lyakhovich, V.V. (October 1978). “An in vivo – in vitro comparison of the effects of bile acids on the structural organization and functional activity of liver microsomal monooxygenases”. Experimental and Molecular Pathology. 20:131-143. DOI:10.1016/0014-4800(78)90033-3
- Tsyrlov, I.B., Zakharova, N.E., Gromova, O.A., Lyakhovich, V.V. (January 1976). “Possible mechanism of induction of liver microsomal monooxygenase by phenobarbital”. Biochimica et Biophysica Acta 421:44-56. DOI:10.1016/0304-4165(76)90168-9
- Tsyrlov, I.B., Gerasimov, K.G. (May 1986). “New Approach to Production of Prolong Acting Medicines Facilitating Hepatic Drug Detoxification System“. Patent SU/EP: 1457593 A1 4 G 01 N 33/48
- Nedosekina, E.A., Oshchepkov, D.Yu., Mordvinov, V.A., Katokhin, A.V., Kuznetsova, T.N., Shamanina, M., Tsyrlov, I.B. (August 2007). “Detection of new potentially active DRE sites in the regulatory region of human genes encoding components of Ah receptor cytosolic complex”. Organohalogen Compounds 69(2):1890-1894. ISSN:1026-4892
- Tsyrlov, I.B., Goldfarb, I.S., Gelboin, H.V. (December 1993). “Enzyme-kinetic and immunochemical characteristics of mouse cDNA-expressed, microsomal, and purified CYP1A1 and CYP1A2”. Archives of Biochemistry and Biophysics 307:259-266. DOI:10.1006/abbi.1993.1588
- Tsyrlov, I.B., Mikhailenko, V.M., Gelboin, H.V. (March 1994). “Isozyme- and species-specific susceptibility of cDNA-expressed CYP1A P-450s to different flavonoids”. Biochimica et Biophysica Acta 1205:325-335. DOI:10.1016/0167-4838(94)90252-6
- Tsyrlov, I.B., Pokrovsky, A.G. (September 1993), “Stimulatory effect of the CYP1A1 inducer 2,3,7,8-tetrachlorodibenzo-p-dioxin on the reproduction of HIV-1 in human lymphoid cell culture”. Xenobiotica 23:457-467. DOI:10.3109/00498259309057034
- Tsyrlov, I.B., Shur, I.N. (August 2008). "Mechanistic Insight into Activation by Dioxin-Type Xenobiotics of Cancer-Linked Common Human Viruses and HIV-1 Virus". The Lancet Infectious Diseases 8:P496-9. DOI:10.1016/70172–5
- Tsyrlov, I.B., Shur, I.N., Oshchepkov, D.Yu., Pokrovsky, A.G. (June 2012). "Xenobiotical virology: novel mechanistic concept of hazardous human viruses upregulation by body burden level of dioxins via AhR-mediated transcriptional pathway". International Journal of Infectious Diseases 16(Suppl. 1):e112-9. DOI:org/10.1016/j.ijid.2012.05.258.e112
