= Top Gear series 8 =

Top Gear
- Series 8
- Starring: Jeremy Clarkson; Richard Hammond; James May; The Stig
- No. of episodes: 8

Release
- Original network: BBC Two
- Original release: 7 May – 30 July 2006

Series chronology
- ← Previous; Series 7 Next → Series 9

Series 8 of Top Gear, a British motoring magazine and factual television programme, was broadcast in the United Kingdom on BBC Two during 2006, consisting of eight episodes that were aired between 7 May and 30 July; because of the 2006 FIFA World Cup, the series took a month-long hiatus between its fifth and sixth episodes. This series saw the programme receive a brand new opening title sequence, a brand new studio, and a brand new car for the "Star in a Reasonably Priced Car". Throughout the series, the show also saw Richard Hammond bringing along one of his dogs for episodes, which would have small appearances in films in the following series.

This series' highlights included the presenters attempting to make amphibious cars, setting an indoor speed record with an F1 car, and conducting challenges as van drivers. A film shown in this series received several complaints, which led to Jeremy Clarkson admitting that some of its content was staged for a publicity stunt.

== Production ==
In early 2006, production of Top Gear began to outgrow the old studio that had been used for the past seven series, leading the BBC to look for a bigger site for the eighth series. Plans were put underway to shift the film site from Dunsfold to Enstone, Oxfordshire, but while negotiations were underway, West Oxfordshire council received concerns from locals who feared the move would increase noise and air pollution at the proposed site, and thus blocked the initial application for the move. The BBC thus decided against the move and went ahead with filming at the old site after revamping and expanding the studio set, despite not having a permit to do so.

In addition, the programme also opted for changing the vehicle it used for its celebrity segment, the Suzuki Liana, with a newer model for the new series. Its replacement, the Chevrolet Lacetti, meant that the Celebrity Lap Board had to be wiped clean, as the new vehicle differed in speed and performance, whilst the format of the segment was revised - celebrities would be given training over a few laps, then conduct a timed lap that would be recorded, rather than taking the best time of their practice lap. Although the Liana was replaced, it was retained for later episodes for use by F1 drivers, until the end of the twenty-second series.

== Episodes ==
No. overall	No. in series	Reviews	Features/challenges	Guest(s)	Original release date	UK viewers (millions)
67	1	Koenigsegg CCX • Honda Civic • Nissan Micra C+C	The Convertible People Carrier: (Renault Espace)	Well-spoken man • Alan Davies • Trevor Eve • Jimmy Carr • Justin Hawkins • Rick Wakeman • Les Ferdinand	7 May 2006	4.75
The trio wonder what how hard it is to create a convertible people carrier, after converting a Renault Espace into one and putting it through a number of challenges, including taking it into a safari park and subjecting it to a brand new car wash. Meanwhile, Hammond is embarrassed with driving a hot pink Nissan Micra C+C around Ledbury, Herefordshire, May looks at the newly restyled Honda Civic, Clarkson claims he's found a good way to give up smoking with the new £415,000 Koenigsegg CCX, and there's a new reasonably priced car in use – the old Suzuki Liana is gone, replaced with the Chevrolet Lacetti, so a new Lap Board is in use and several celebrities are invited to set a time in it.
68	2	Chevrolet Corvette Z06 • Jaguar XK vs. Germans: (Mercedes-Benz SL 350 • BMW 650i)	Tomcat 4WD vs. Motor powered kayak race in Iceland • Presenting a drive time radio show • The Stig does a farewell lap for the Suzuki Liana	Gordon Ramsay	14 May 2006	4.47
The group take over hosting a 3-hour block for BBC Southern Counties Radio, to see how hard it is to host a Drive Time Radio Show, and things soon go downhill from the start. Meanwhile, Hammond is in Iceland to race a man with powered canoe against a specially prepped 4x4 Tomcat, Clarkson tests out the new Jaguar XK in Yorkshire and the Chevrolet Corvette Z06 on the track, while celebrity chef Gordon Ramsay returns to try out the Lacetti and the Stig sees shows how fast he is in the Liana.
69	3	Lotus Exige S	Amphibious cars challenge: (Toyota Hilux • Volkswagen T3 • Triumph Herald)	Philip Glenister	21 May 2006	4.75
The presenters are tasked turning a car into an amphibious vehicle and capturing the public's imagination—Hammond buys a 1983 Volkswagen T3 campervan and turns it into a houseboat, May converts a 1962 Triumph Herald into a sailing craft with a mast and some sails, and Clarkson uses a 1989 Toyota Hilux pick-up truck and plants a huge outboard motor on its back. The trio soon see how their creations fare on the road, before taking them onto the waters of Rudyard Lake near Leek, Staffordshire and crossing two miles of it, where one of the presenters has a sinking feeling about their amphibious car. Meanwhile, Clarkson reviews the Lotus Exige S on the Top Gear test track, and actor Philip Glenister is the latest star in the new reasonably priced car.
70	4	BMW Z4 M • Porsche Boxster S • Mercedes-Benz S500 • Porsche Cayenne Turbo S	Koenigsegg CCX With Top Gear Wing • Designing "Anne Hathaway's Cottage" in a Mercedes S280 • Porsche Cayenne vs. parachutist	Ewan McGregor	28 May 2006	3.83
Clarkson has a look at what features will be present in cars in ten years time, that can be found on the new Mercedes-Benz S-Class, before tackling the issue of interior design on the S-Class by redoing the interior of an old 1996 Mercedes-Benz S-Class to be like his house, with Hammond and May helping by finding out how much it has changed the car's performance. Meanwhile, there's a test of how good the BMW Z4 M is on the track, Hammond races in a Porsche Cayenne Turbo S against a British army parachuter in Cyprus, Ewan McGregor talks about his car history before he sees how he fared in the Lacetti, and the Koenigsegg CCX is back to see if it is much faster after having been equipped with a rear spoiler, following its accident on the track at the beginning of the series.
71	5	Prodrive P2 • Citroën C6	Car football game II • Time-trial challenge with Sir Jackie Stewart	Sir Michael Gambon	4 June 2006	5.01
"Captain Slow" is put through his paces, as Jackie Stewart attempts to prove he can cut May's best lap time around the Oulton Park circuit by 20 seconds. Meanwhile, Clarkson hopes the madness of the Citroën CX has rubbed off on the new Citroën C6 and tries out the Prodrive P2 concept car on the track, a team of Toyota Aygos defend their honour in a match of Car Football against a team of the new Volkswagen Fox, and Sir Michael Gambon returns to discuss his role as Albus Dumbledore in the Harry Potter films before seeing how he fared in the Lacetti.
72	6	Cheap Saloons: (Ford Mondeo ST220 • Mazda 6 MPS • Vauxhall Vectra VXR)	Caravan holiday • Indoor speed record in an F1 racer	Brian Cox	16 July 2006	3.66
The boys go on a caravan holiday in Dorset to try to find out more about caravaning, seeing if the Kia Cerato is a good tow car with their "home, away from home", the Elddis Shamal XL. It's not long before they find themselves having trouble getting to the caravan site, dealing with a sick dog, damaging a neighbouring caravan and struggling to have fun, before worse follows. Meanwhile, the Stig has a go at the nonexistent indoor world speed record with a Toyota TF105 F1 car and very nearly accidentally sets it in the Lacetti, Brian Cox talks with Clarkson about his roles as villains and his Toyota Priuses before setting a time in the Lacetti, and Clarkson tests out three hot saloons—Ford Mondeo ST220, Mazda 6 MPS, and Vauxhall Vectra VXR.
73	7	Lamborghini Gallardo Spyder • Peugeot 207 1.6L Diesel • Sporty People Carriers: (Ford S-Max 2.5L 200 PS • Mercedes-Benz B200 Turbo • Vauxhall Zafira VXR)	Caterham Seven kit car race • Peugeot 207 vs. parkour masters race in Liverpool	Steve Coogan	23 July 2006	3.89
The boys find themselves in a race against The Stig, as he tries to drive a Caterham Seven kit car from Caterham's base in Caterham, Surrey, to the start line of the Knockhill Racing Circuit in Scotland, while they try to get there first after building the same model as fast as they can in the pit garage at the circuit, and there are plenty of mishaps for them as they build their car. Meanwhile, Hammond and May try out three people carriers—the Ford S-MAX, the Mercedes-Benz B-Class, and the Vauxhall Zafira VXR—to see which is best, Clarkson tests out the Lamborghini Gallardo Spyder, there's another race between May in a Peugeot 207 1.6L Diesel and two traceurs (masters of Parkour which involves running and leaping across/off buildings) across Liverpool, while Steve Coogan talks about hot tubs and Arnold Schwarzenegger after having a go in the Lacetti.
74	8	Noble M15	Being van roadies with The Who: (Volkswagen T30 TDI 174 Sportline • Ford Transit • Renault Master) • £1,000 Van Man challenge: (Ford Transit • Suzuki Super Carry • LDV Convoy)	Jenson Button • Ray Winstone	30 July 2006	5.27
The trio take a look at what it's like to drive vans, as they take a Renault Master, a Ford Transit and a Volkswagen T30 TDI 174 Sportline, and become roadies for The Who. Then later on, the trio each buy a second-hand van for less than £1,000—Clarkson plays it safe and buys a Ford Transit, May gets a sluggish LDV Convoy, and Hammond buys a small but nippy Suzuki Supercarry—before seeing who got the best deal by undertaking series of challenges, including carrying stuff, replacing a door, and staying ahead of The Stig in a police car. Meanwhile, there's a review of the most powerful Noble yet to grace the track, the Noble M15, British actor Ray Winstone discusses how got into drama before seeing his lap time in the Lacetti, and 2009 F1 World Champion Jenson Button sees if he can win a £20 bet with Clarkson that he can go faster around the track in the Liana than The Stig did.

== Criticism ==
The eighth series saw Top Gear receive criticism over its film featuring the presenters undertaking a caravanning holiday, which focused on the final scene of their caravan catching fire. Clarkson commented about the complaints during the following episode, before proclaiming that it had not been an 'accident' as first implied, but a publicity stunt to show everyone how much Top Gear hates caravans.
