= Top Gear series 7 =

Top Gear
- Series 7
- Starring: Jeremy Clarkson; Richard Hammond; James May; The Stig
- No. of episodes: 7

Release
- Original network: BBC Two
- Original release: 13 November 2005 – 12 February 2006

Series chronology
- ← Previous; Series 6 Next → Series 8

Series 7 of Top Gear, a British motoring magazine and factual television programme, was broadcast in the United Kingdom on BBC Two during 2005, consisting of six episodes between 13 October and 27 December. This series' highlights included a race involving the Bugatti Veyron, and a motoring challenge involving budget second-hand supercars.

After the series concluded, it was followed by a "Winter Olympics" special, featuring the presenters doing their own version of sporting events with cars, which aired on 12 February 2006, and a compilation series titled "Best of Top Gear" aired that same year between 13 March and 4 April, looking back over the last seven series of the programme.

== Episodes ==
No. overall	No. in series	Reviews	Features/challenges	Guest(s)	Original release date	UK viewers (millions)
60	1	Ascari KZ1	Shootout: Performance sports coupes (Aston Martin V8 Vantage • BMW M6 • Porsche 911 Carrera S) on the Isle of Man • Top Gear survey 2005 results	Trevor Eve	13 November 2005	3.74
The presenters travel back to the Isle of Man to compare a new set of sports coupes to see which the best—the Aston Martin V8 Vantage, the BMW M6, and the Porsche 911 Carrera S. Meanwhile, Hammond takes a look at the Ascari KZ1 on the Test Track, while there's a look at the results of the Top Gear survey for 2005. Finally, Trevor Eve makes a lap in the Liana and breaks a wheel in the process.
61	2	Porsche Cayman S • Audi RS4	Life-sized RC cars • History of British racing green • Audi RS4 vs Speed Climbers race	Ian Wright	20 November 2005	4.48
Clarkson reviews the Porsche Cayman S at the Test Track, and then tests out the Audi RS4 with a race against some climbers within the Verdon Gorge in France. Meanwhile, Hammond and May try out some life-size radio control cars made from real cars, and there's a brief look back to the history of British racing green since it was first introduced. Finally, footballer Ian Wright uses his feet on the pedals of the Liana.
62	3	Ford Focus ST	Supercar road trip to Millau Viaduct, France (Ford GT • Pagani Zonda S • Ferrari F430 Spider)	Stephen Ladyman	27 November 2005	4.61
The presenters go on a road trip across France to see the Millau Viaduct, each bringing along their favourite supercar—the Pagani Zonda S, the Ferrari F430 Spider, and the Ford GT—and along the way seeing how they fare on city streets, motorways and mountain roads. Meanwhile, Clarkson reviews the Ford Focus ST on the Test Track, and British transport minister Stephen Ladyman injures the Liana as he tries to set a time on the test track.
63	4	Pagani Zonda F • Renault Clio	Italian mid-engine supercars for less than £10,000 (Maserati Merak • Ferrari 308 GT4 • Lamborghini Urraco) • Renault Clio vs. downhill cyclist race in Lisbon	Dame Ellen MacArthur	4 December 2005	4.88
The presenter each buy a second-hand Italian supercar for £10,000—a Ferrari 308 GT4, a Maserati Merak, and a Lamborghini Urraco—and endure a series of challenges for their purchases between Bristol and Slough, along with a series of serious issues. Meanwhile, Hammond reviews the Pagani Zonda F, and May races the Renault Clio against a mountain biker in Lisbon. Finally, Ellen MacArthur switches sailboats for a lap in the Liana. Note: Following the death of 2001 World Rally Champion Richard Burns on 25th November 2005, this episodes news segment was made into a video montage tribute for Burns.
64	5	Marcos TSO • Bugatti Veyron	Epic race: Bugatti Veyron versus Cessna 182 light airplane from Alba, Italy to London • RWD vs. AWD Porsches debate: Porsche 911 Carrera 4 vs Porsche 911 Carrera 2	Nigel Mansell	11 December 2005	4.76
The presenters embark in another car vs. transport race, seeing which can get a truffle from Northern Italy to a restaurant in London—Clarkson in the Bugatti Veyron supercar, against Hammond and May using a Cessna 182 light aircraft. Meanwhile, there's a review of the Marcos TSO GT2, and comparisons of two Porsche 911s at the Millennium Stadium. Finally, British racing driver Nigel Mansell comes to see how fast he is in the Liana.
65	6	Volkswagen Golf R32 • BMW 130i • Mazda MX-5 • Honda NSX	Old generation vs. New generation car culture • Lap times from a video game vs. Real life in the Honda NSX • Mazda MX-5 vs. Greyhound race • Top Gear Awards 2005	David Walliams • Jimmy Carr	27 December 2005	4.52
Clarkson attempts to recreate a lap time from a video game, using the same car—the Honda NSX – and the same circuit—the Laguna Seca racetrack. Meanwhile, there are reviews of the Volkswagen Golf R32, BMW 130i, and Mazda MX-5, classic and modified cars compete at the Prescott Hill Climb Course, and the 2005 Top Gear Awards are announced, Finally, comedian David Walliams is in the Liana, with a surprise appearance from Jimmy Carr.
66	7	None – Special	Top Gear Winter Olympics	None	12 February 2006	5.22
Top Gear does the Winter Olympics from the former venue at Lillehammer, Norway. Clarkson and May get to work with three car-based events—cross-country racing, speed skating, and off-road slalom. Meanwhile, the Bobsleigh challenge from the fifth series is revisited, and there's a survival challenge between Hammond and a car in Arctic temperatures. Finally, the presenters conduct "Car Ice Hockey", and getting a Mini to do a sky jump. Note: The closing credits referenced the Swedish pop group ABBA by replacing the first name of the presenters and production crew members with those of the group's members.

=== Compilation episodes ===
Total	No.	Title	Feature	Original air date
S4	CE–1	"The Best of Top Gear: 2005 #1"	Best Moments from Last Seven Series – Part 1	13 March 2006
A look back to some of the best moments from the last seven series. Highlights include the Heathrow To Oslo Race between the presenters, and the reviews of the Ford Focus ST, the Volkswagen Golf R32, and the BMW 130i.
S5	CE–2	"The Best of Top Gear: 2005 #2 – The Special Guests"	Best Moments from Last Seven Series – Part 2 • Tour of Top Gear Studio by Jimmy Carr	13 March 2006
A look back to some of the best moments from the last seven series. Highlights include best moments from past special guests, getting a Transit Van around the Nurburgring, the supercar shootout between the Aston Martin Vanquish S and the Ferrari 575M, and the Audi RS4's race against the Speed Mountain-Climbers. In addition, Jimmy Carr gives a behind-the-scenes look of Top Gear during a day of filming for an episode.
S6	CE–3	"The Best of Top Gear: 2005 #3 – The Challenges"	Best Moments from Last Seven Series – Part 3	20 March 2006
A look back to some of the best moments from the last seven series. Highlights include a look at some of the show's best challenges, including the difficulties faced in finding a second-hand Italian, Mid-Engined Supercar, the Range Rover Sport vs. Challenger 2 Tank duel, and the Renault Clio's race with the Urban Biker.
S7	CE–4	"The Best of Top Gear: 2005 #4 – The Supercars"	Best Moments from Last Seven Series – Part 4	27 March 2006
A look back to some of the best moments from the last seven series. Highlights include the best moments with supercars driven on Top Gear, including the Bugatti Veyron vs. Cessna Aeroplane race, the Aston Martin DB9 vs. Train race, as well as a compilation of moments from the Stig's Power Laps and Cool Wall segments.
S8	CE–5	"The Best of Top Gear: 2005 #5 – The Best of British"	Best Moments from Last Seven Series – Part 5	4 April 2006
A look back to some of the best moments from the last seven series. Highlights include some of the best British moments from the show, including the review of the Ascari KZ1, and the laps in the Liana by Stephen Fry, Joanna Lumley, Sir Ranulph Fiennes and Ellen MacArthur.
