= Mercedes-Benz B-Class =

Subcompact executive MPV produced by Mercedes-Benz

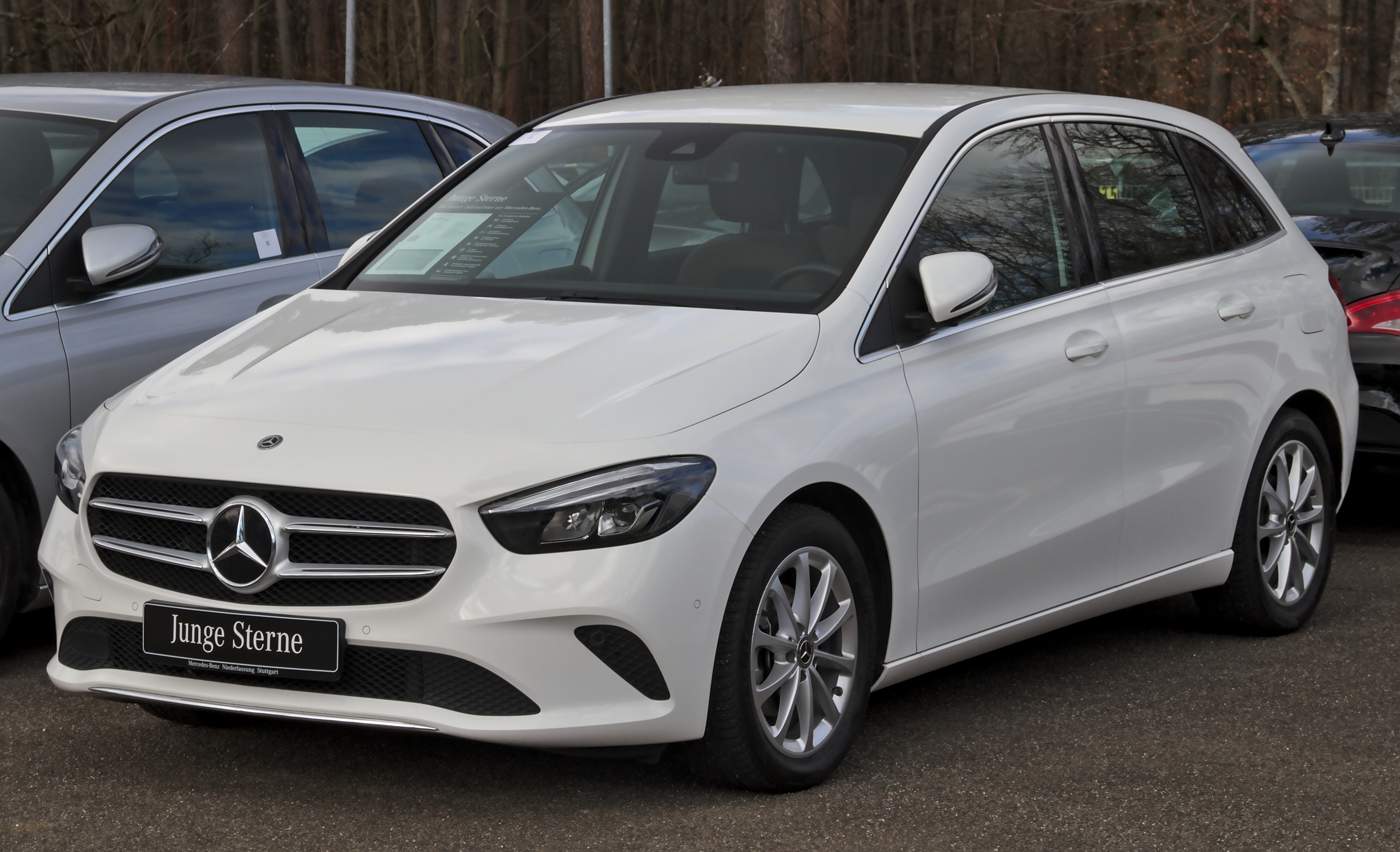

Overview
- Manufacturer: DaimlerChrysler (2005–2007); Daimler AG (2007–2022); Mercedes-Benz Group (2022–2026)
- Also called: B-Class Sports Tourer
- Production: June 2005 – 2026

Body and chassis
- Class: Subcompact executive MPV
- Body style: 5-door hatchback
- Layout: Front-engine, front-wheel-drive / four-wheel-drive

The Mercedes-Benz B-Class is a subcompact executive car manufactured and marketed by Mercedes-Benz since 2005. Based on the A-Class with larger dimensions, the European New Car Assessment Programme (Euro NCAP) classifies it as a small MPV.

Mercedes-Benz had presented a concept car Vision B Compact Sports Tourer at the 2004 Paris Motor Show. The concept previewed some features that would be available on the production B-Class. The Vision B was based on the layered platform, so that the drivetrain would be placed partly in front of and underneath the passengers.

As of 20 December 2013, delivery of B-Class vehicles reached 1 million sales worldwide since its launch in 2005.

== First generation (W245; 2005) ==
First generation
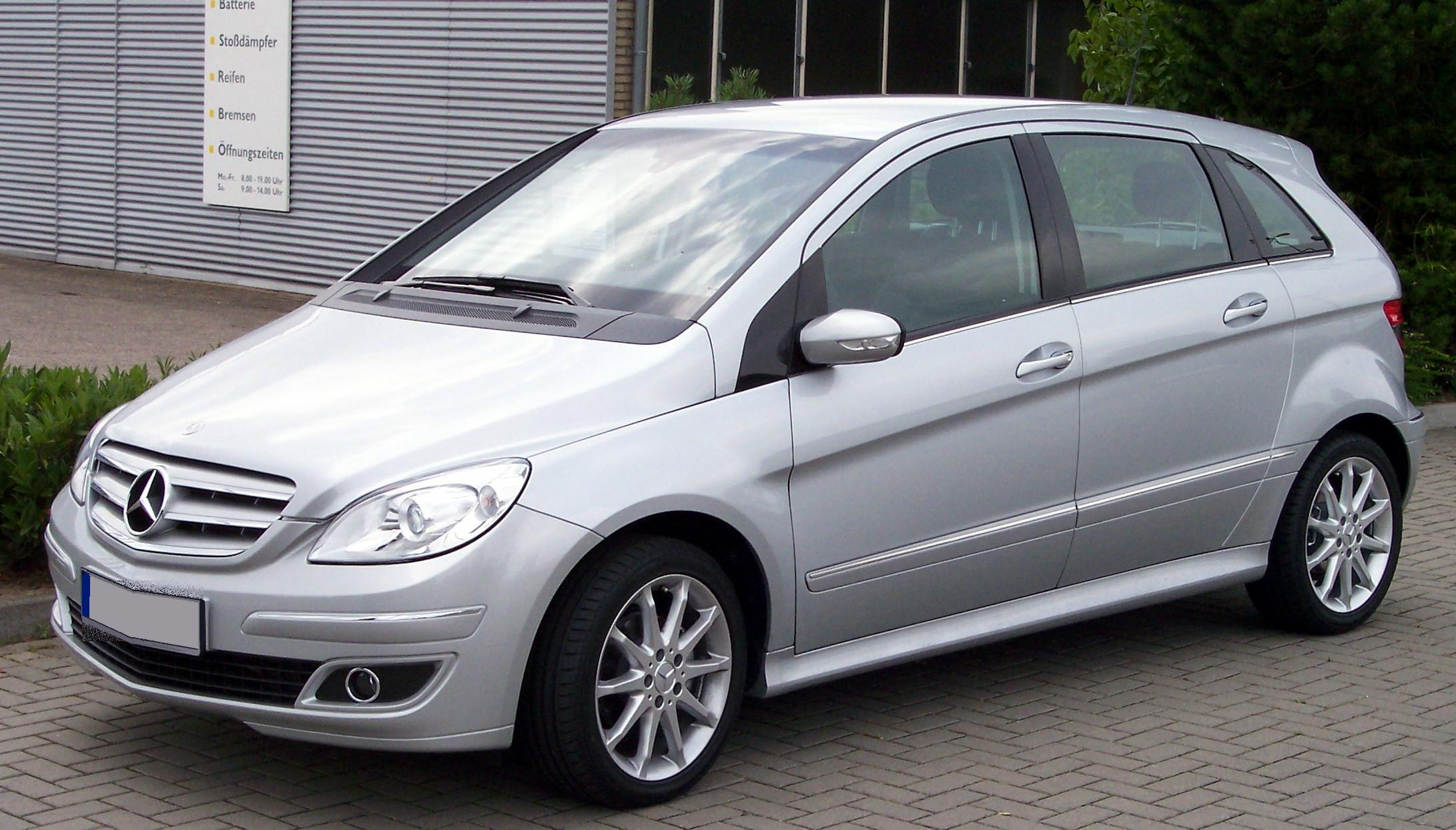
- Pre-facelift

Overview
- Model code: W245
- Production: June 2005 – 2011
- Assembly: Germany: Rastatt

Body and chassis
- Related: A-Class (W169)

Powertrain
- Engine: Petrol: 1.5 L M266.920 I4; 1.7 L M266.940 I4; 2.0 L M266.960 I4; 2.0 L M266.980 turbo I4; Diesel: 2.0 L OM640 CDI turbo I4
- Transmission: 5/6-speed manual CVT

Dimensions
- Wheelbase: 2006–08: 2,786 mm (109.7 in); 2009–11: 2,779 mm (109.4 in)
- Length: 4,270 mm (168.1 in)
- Width: 1,778 mm (70.0 in)
- Height: 2006–08: 1,613 mm (63.5 in); 2009–11: 1,603 mm (63.1 in)

The first-generation B-Class was introduced in Europe, Australia, and other parts of the world in early 2005, and in Canada in late 2005. It was marketed globally except in the United States, where it was unable to price match the vehicle for profit. The B-Class uses front-wheel drive with sandwich floor construction, parabolic rear suspension, and a two-box design — one for the drivetrain and another for the shared passenger and luggage compartment. The B-Class maximises its interior volume via its height. Having derived from the smaller A-Class, it retained that car's sandwich floor concept.

All models included passive automobile safety systems including ESP, ABS, traction control, cornering lights, active lighting system, and headlamp assist. In the event of a frontal impact the engine and transmission slide beneath the passenger compartment.

In 2008, it was updated with a start-stop system and a BlueEFFICIENCY option. A new NGT variant was added, which could burn either petrol or natural gas.

In 2011, Mercedes-Benz did a world tour with three of its Mercedes-Benz F-Cell vehicles, one of which was the B-Class. The hydrogen-powered fuel cell vehicle was driven more than 30,000 kilometres in a circumnavigation of the globe, starting and ending in Stuttgart.

=== Pre-facelift ===
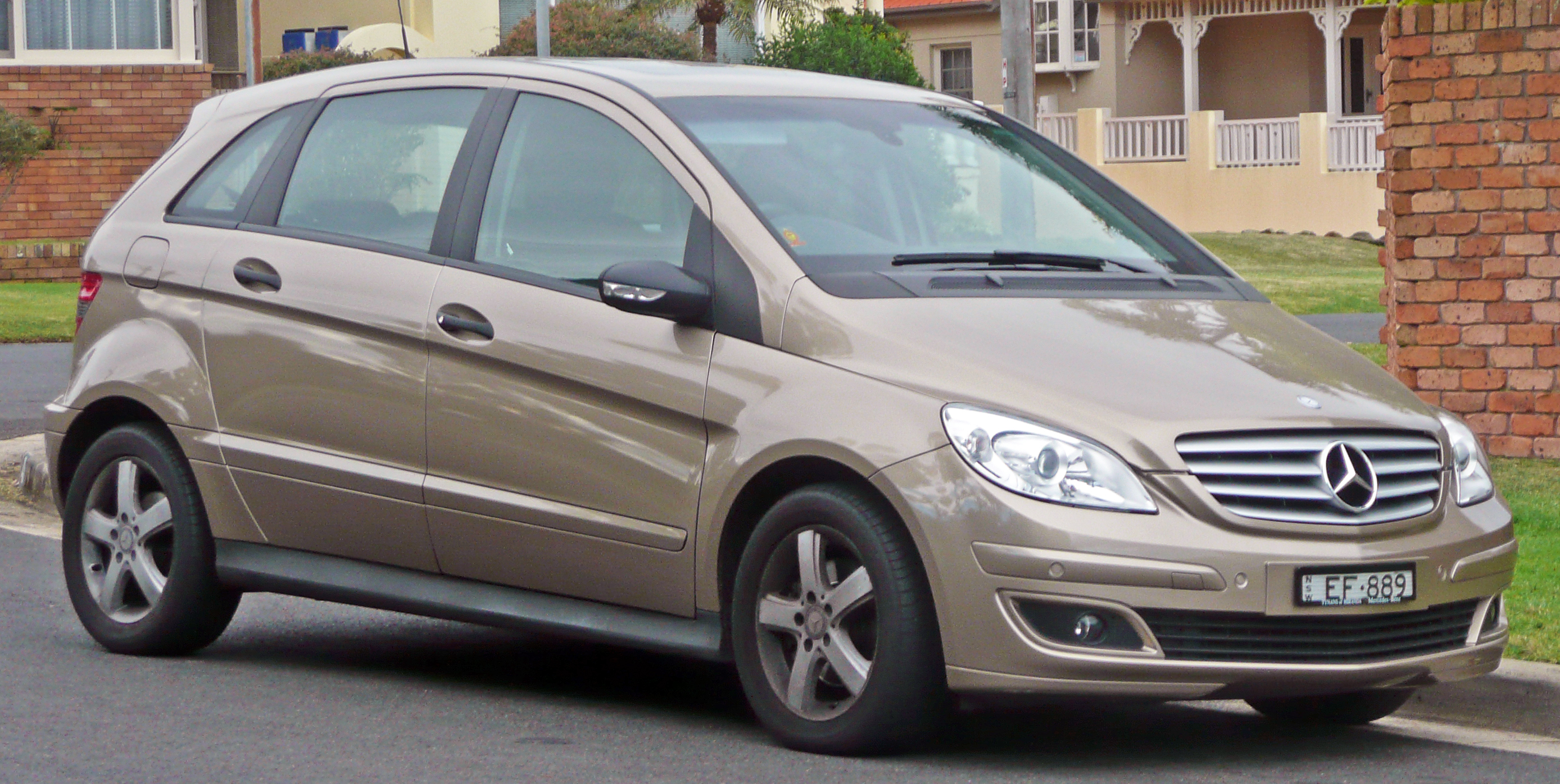
Pre-facelift (front)

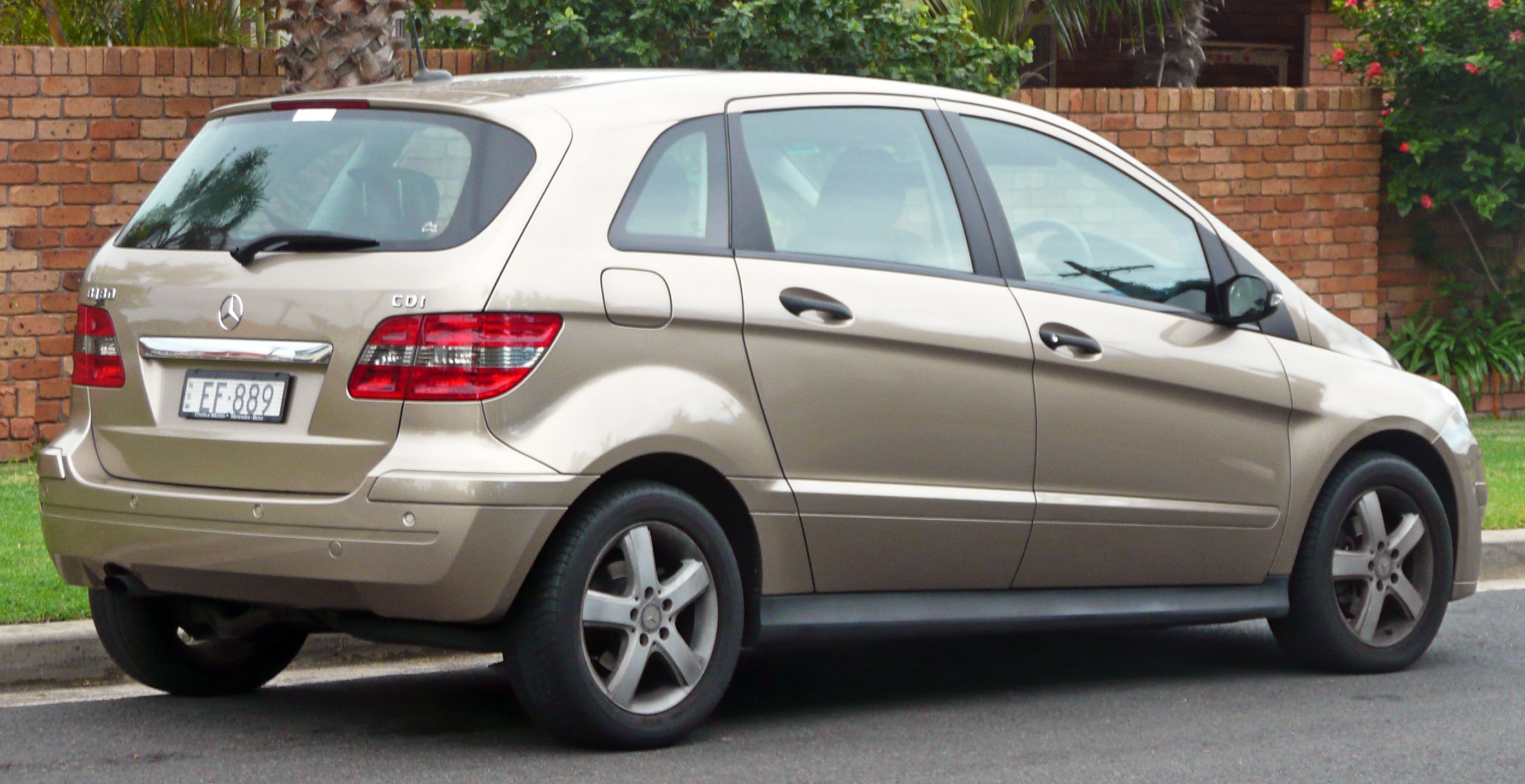
Pre-facelift (rear)

=== Facelift ===
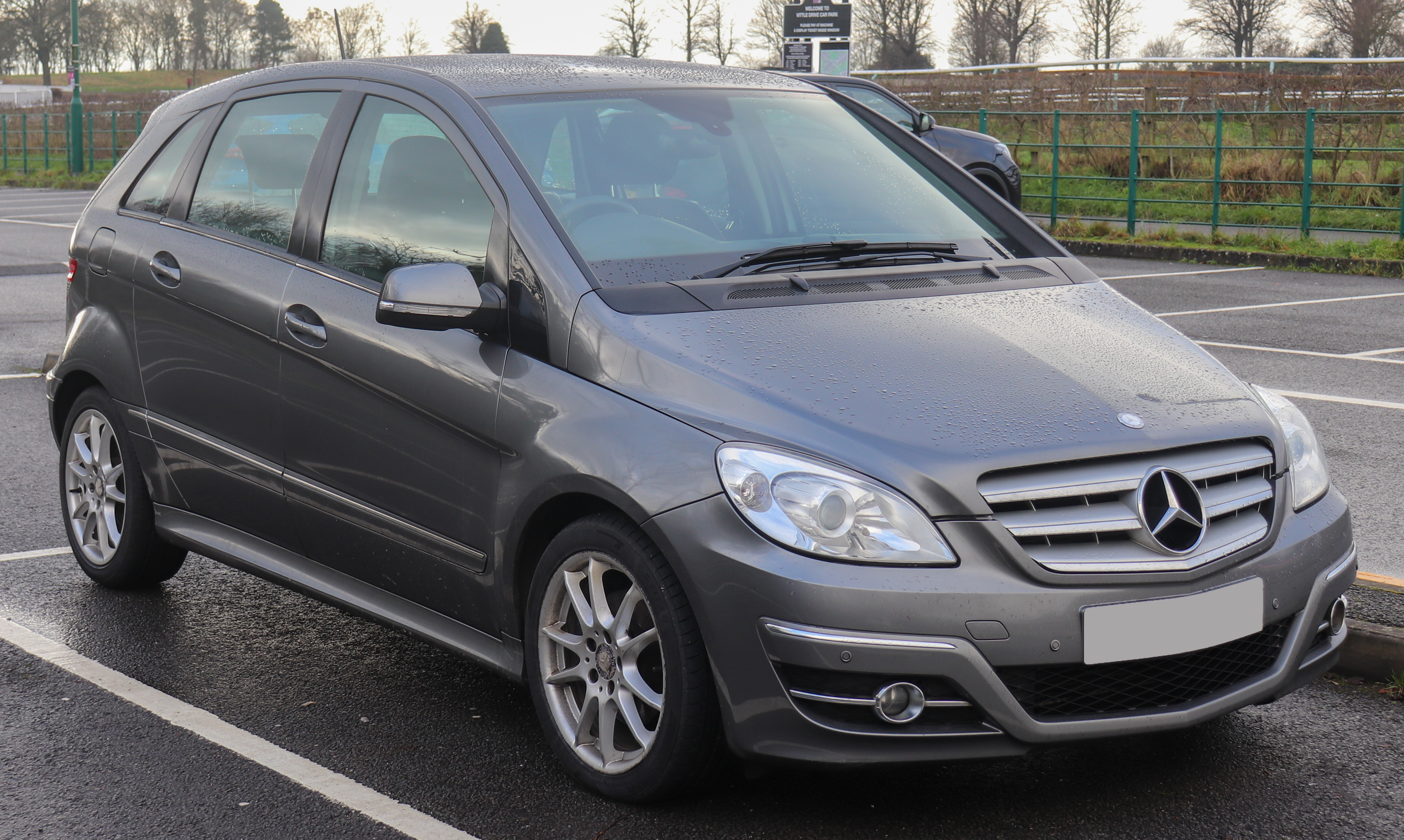
Facelift (front)

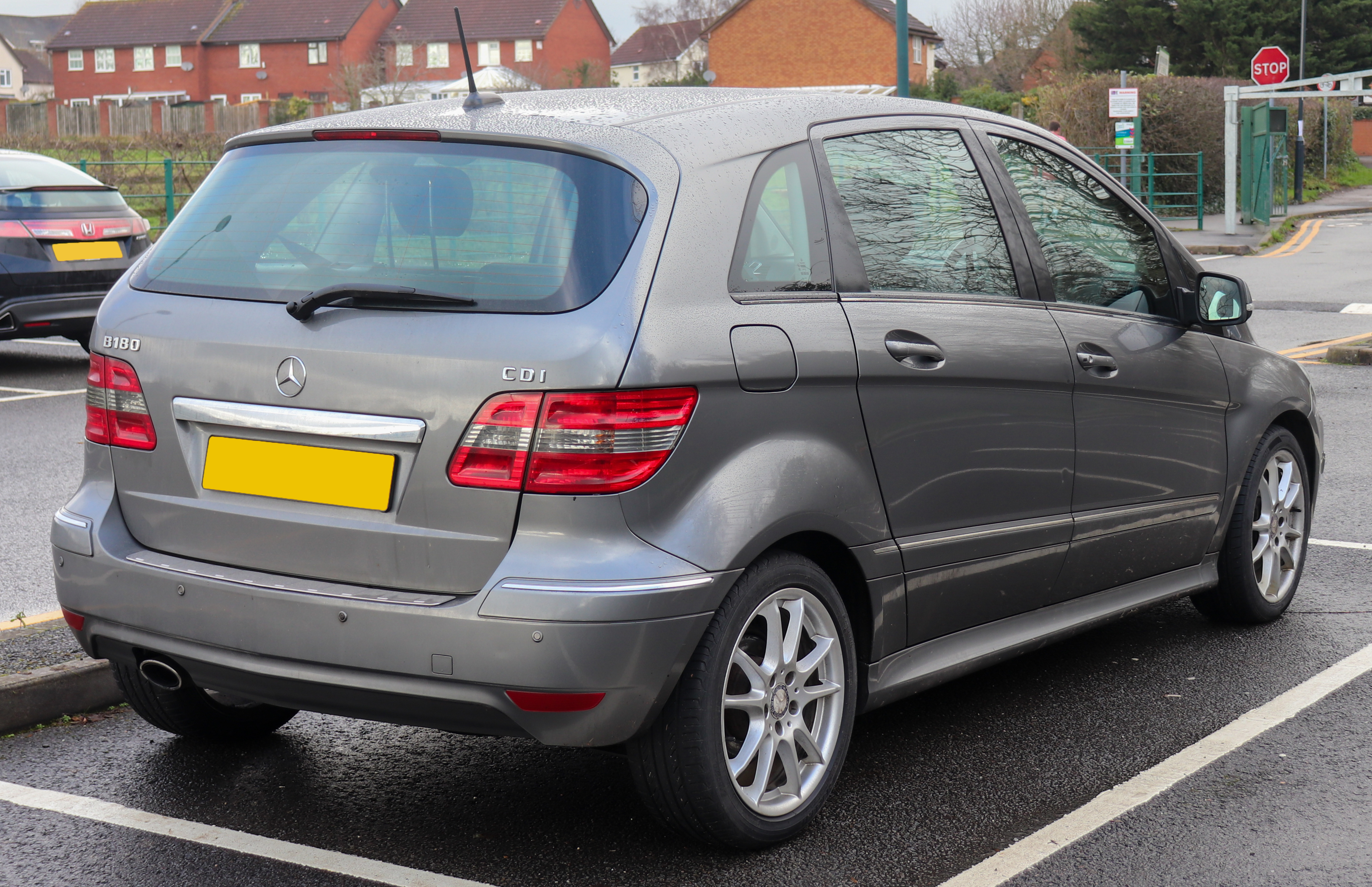
Facelift (rear)

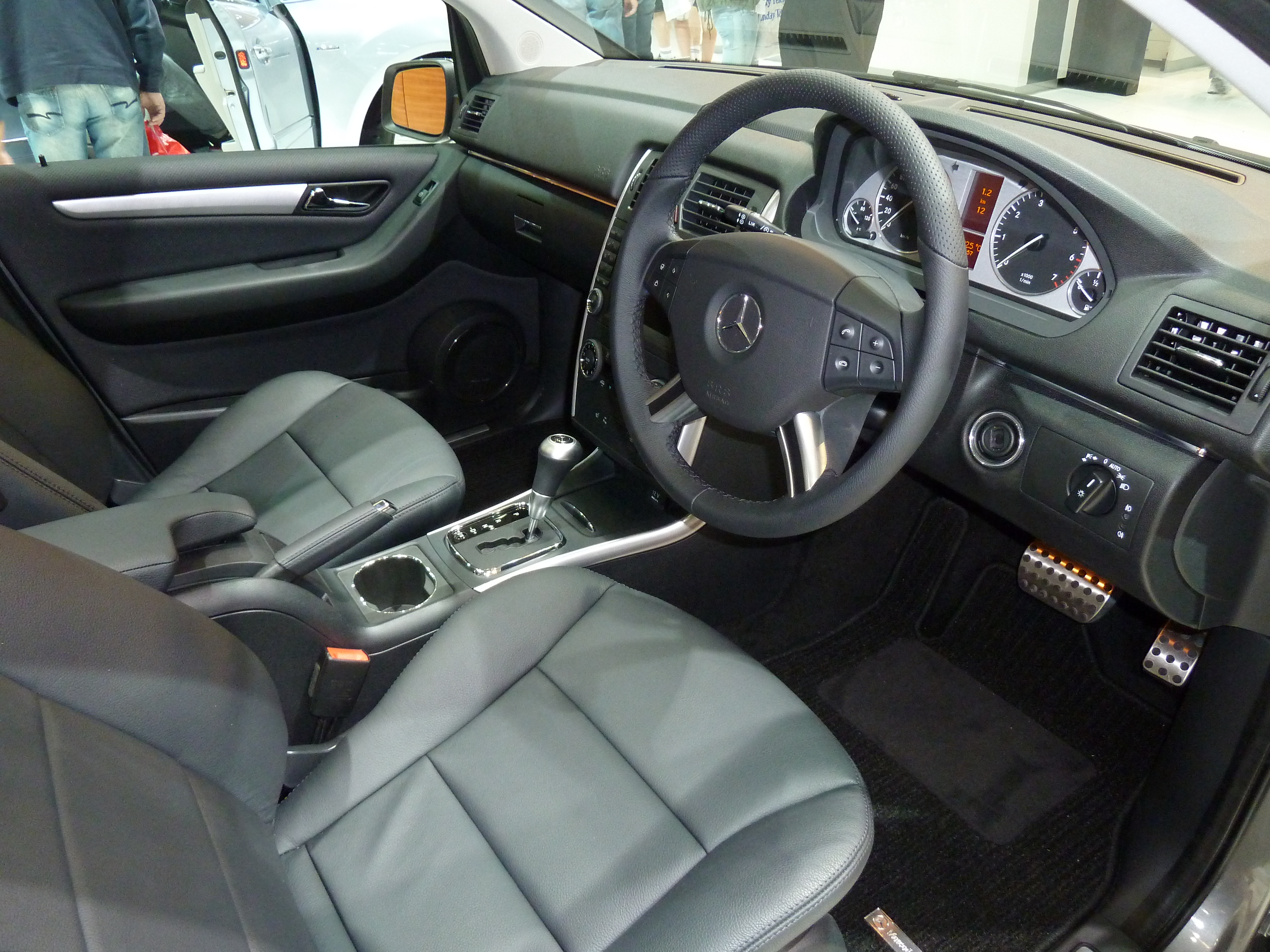
Interior (facelift)

=== Engines ===
The B160 and B180 conform to Euro V emission standards. The rest of the engines conform to Euro IV emission standards. A diesel particulate filter is available as an option for the diesel units (this reduces about 99% of the particle emissions, without the need for additives).

Model	Type	Power	Torque	Transmission	Top Speed	0–100 km/h (0–62 mph)	Economy (MPG)	Emissions	Years
Petrol
B160	1.5 L I4	95 PS (70 kW; 94 hp)	140 N⋅m (103 lb⋅ft)	5-speed Manual	174 km/h (108 mph)	13.2 secs	44.1 mpg	149 g/km	
B170; B180	1.7 L I4	116 PS (85 kW; 114 hp)	155 N⋅m (114 lb⋅ft)	5-speed Manual CVT	184 km/h (114 mph)	11.3 secs	44.8 mpg	146 g/km	2005–2009; 2009–2011
B200	2.0 L I4	136 PS (100 kW; 134 hp)	185 N⋅m (136 lb⋅ft)	5-Speed Manual; CVT	196 km/h (122 mph)	10.1 secs	39.2 mpg	173 g/km	
B200 Turbo	2.0 L I4 turbo	193 PS (142 kW; 190 hp)	280 N⋅m (207 lb⋅ft)	6-Speed Manual; CVT	225 km/h (140 mph)	7.6 secs	35.8 mpg	190 g/km	
Diesel
B180 CDI	2.0 L I4	109 PS (80 kW; 108 hp)	250 N⋅m (184 lb⋅ft)	6-Speed Manual; CVT	183 km/h (114 mph)	11.3 secs	54.3 mpg	136 g/km	
B200 CDI	2.0 L I4	140 PS (103 kW; 138 hp)	300 N⋅m (221 lb⋅ft)	6-Speed Manual; CVT	200 km/h (124 mph)	9.6 secs	54.3 mpg	136 g/km	
Natural Gas
B170 NGT	2.0 L I4	116 PS (85 kW; 114 hp)	165 N⋅m (122 lb⋅ft)	5-Speed Manual	184 km/h (114 mph)	12.4 secs	38.7 mpg	135 g/km	

=== Specifications ===
Specification	B180 CDI	B200 CDI	B150	B170/B180	B200	B200 Turbo	B170 NGT FuelEfficiency
length	4,270 mm (168.1 in)						
width	1,777 mm (70.0 in)						
height	1,603 mm (63.1 in)						
wheelbase	2,778 mm (109.4 in)						
Kerb weight	1,435 kg (3,164 lb)	1,435 kg (3,164 lb)	1,300 kg (2,866 lb)	1,310 kg (2,888 lb)	1,345 kg (2,965 lb)	1,370 kg (3,020 lb)	1,445 kg (3,186 lb)
tank capacity	54 L (14 US gal; 12 imp gal)						
tank reserve	6 L (2 US gal; 1 imp gal)						Unknown
Cylinders	inline-four						
Output hp/rpm	109 hp (81 kW; 111 PS) /4200	140 hp (104 kW; 142 PS) /4200	106 hp (79 kW; 107 PS) /5800	116 hp (87 kW; 118 PS) /5500	136 hp (101 kW; 138 PS) /5750	193 hp (144 kW; 196 PS) /5000	116 hp (87 kW; 118 PS)
Torque Nm/rpm	250 N⋅m (184 lb⋅ft) /1600-2600	300 N⋅m (221 lb⋅ft) /1600-3000	160 N⋅m (118 lb⋅ft) /4000-4500	155 N⋅m (114 lb⋅ft) /3500-4000	185 N⋅m (136 lb⋅ft) /3500-4000	280 N⋅m (207 lb⋅ft) /1800-4850	165 N⋅m (122 lb⋅ft) /1800-
Top Speed	183 km/h (114 mph)	200 km/h (124 mph)	185 km/h (115 mph)	183 km/h (114 mph)	196 km/h (122 mph)	225 km/h (140 mph)	184 km/h (114 mph)
Tires	205/55 R 16	205/55 R 16	195/65 R 15	195/65 R 15	205/55 R 16	215/40 R 18	195/65 R 15

=== Safety ===
Euro NCAP test results Mercedes-Benz B180 CDI 'Chrompaket' (LHD) (2006)
Test	Score	Rating
Adult occupant:	34	5 /5 stars
Child occupant:	37	4 /5 stars
Pedestrian:	12	2 /4 stars

ANCAP test results Mercedes-Benz B-Class (2006)
Test	Score
Overall	5 /5 stars
Frontal offset	12.57/16
Side impact	16/16
Pole	2/2
Seat belt reminders	3/3
Whiplash protection	Not Assessed
Pedestrian protection	Marginal
Electronic stability control	Standard

== Second generation (W246; 2011) ==
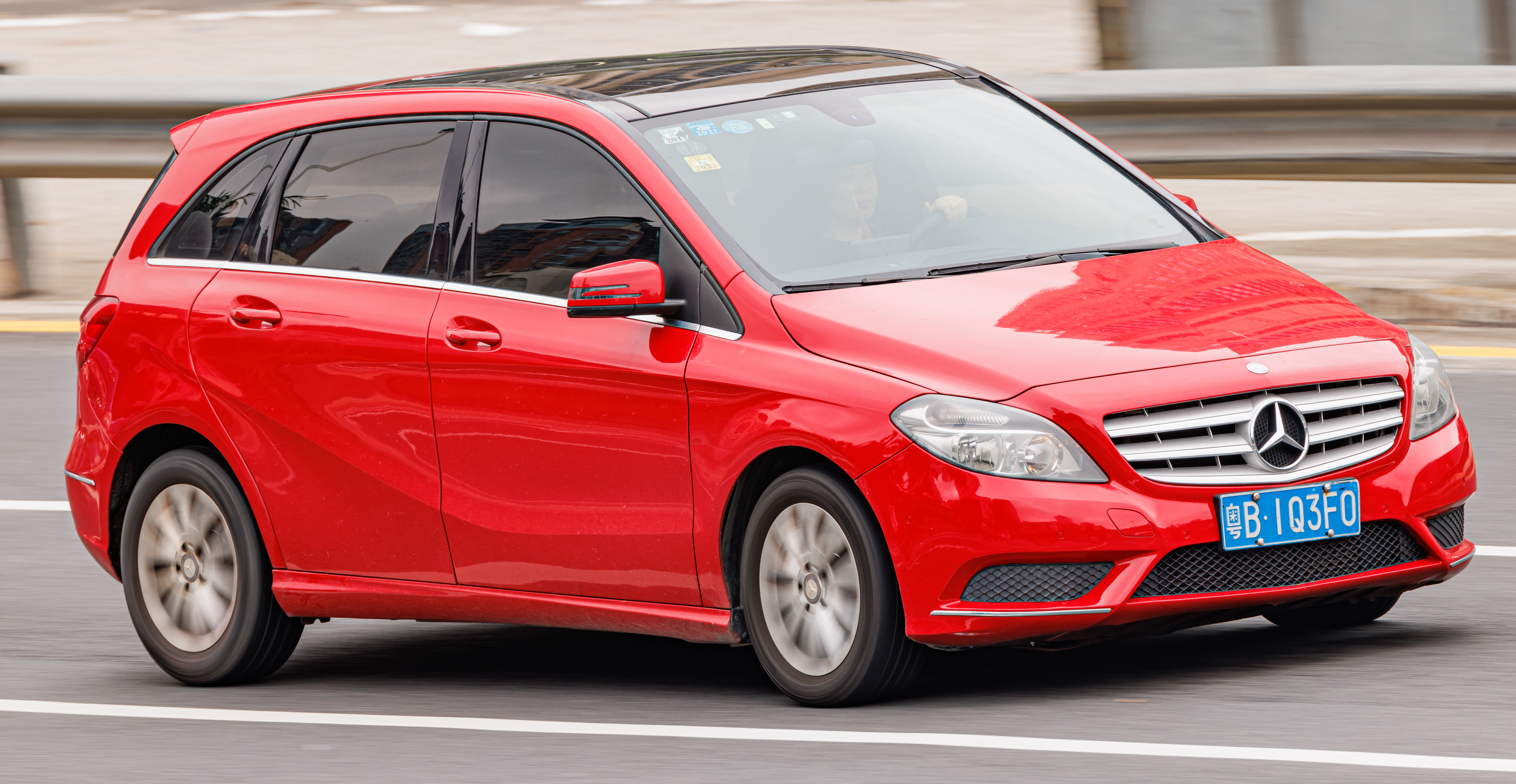
Pre-facelift B 200

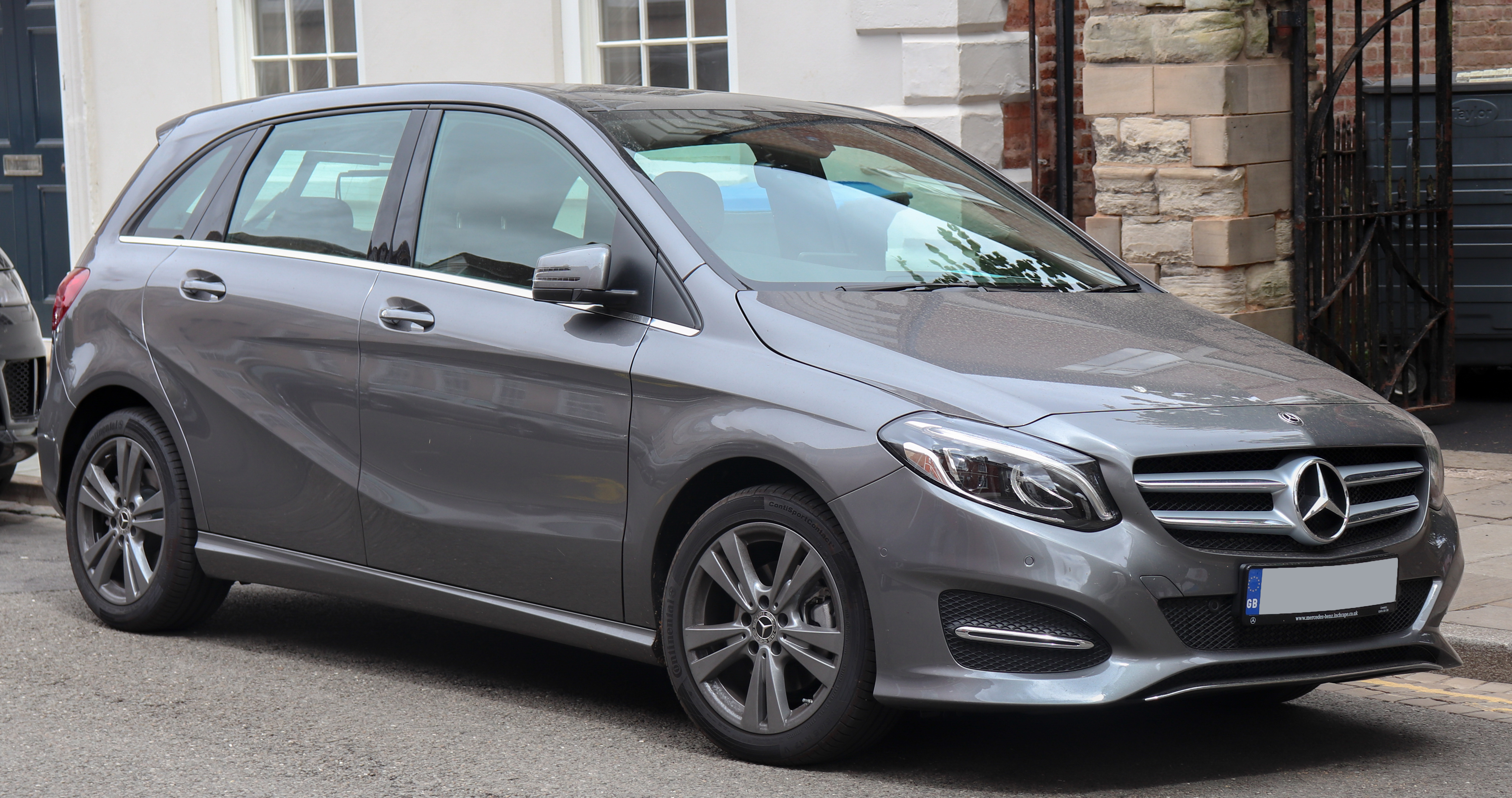
Facelift B 220d Exclusive

The W246 was revealed in August 2011, and made its public debut in September 2011 at the 2011 International Motor Show Germany. It was announced that the B-Class would come standard with a 6-speed manual transmission, as well as an optional 7G-Tronic automatic. The start/stop technology was standard on all models.

Mass production of the B-Class started in November 2011 at the Rastatt plant in Germany. Additionally, the B-Class was the first vehicle to use the MFA platform.

Safety features include seven to nine airbags, hill-start assist, driver drowsiness detection, tyre pressure monitoring, Pre-Safe system that will tighten seatbelts, and a system that will automatically close the windows and the sunroof if the systems detect an approaching accident. Other safety systems include anti-lock braking (ABS), electronic stability control (ESC), and brake assistant (BA).

The B-Class Electric Drive was introduced to the U.S. in December 2013 as an early 2014 model. It is one of the only B-Class models to ever be sold in the U.S. market, as well as being the first Mercedes-Benz vehicle to ever be offered in an electric variant, though it was only available in certain states that required ZEV mandates. It was originally rebadged as the B-Class Electric Drive, but in 2017, it was renamed the B250e.

== Third generation (W247; 2018) ==
Third generation
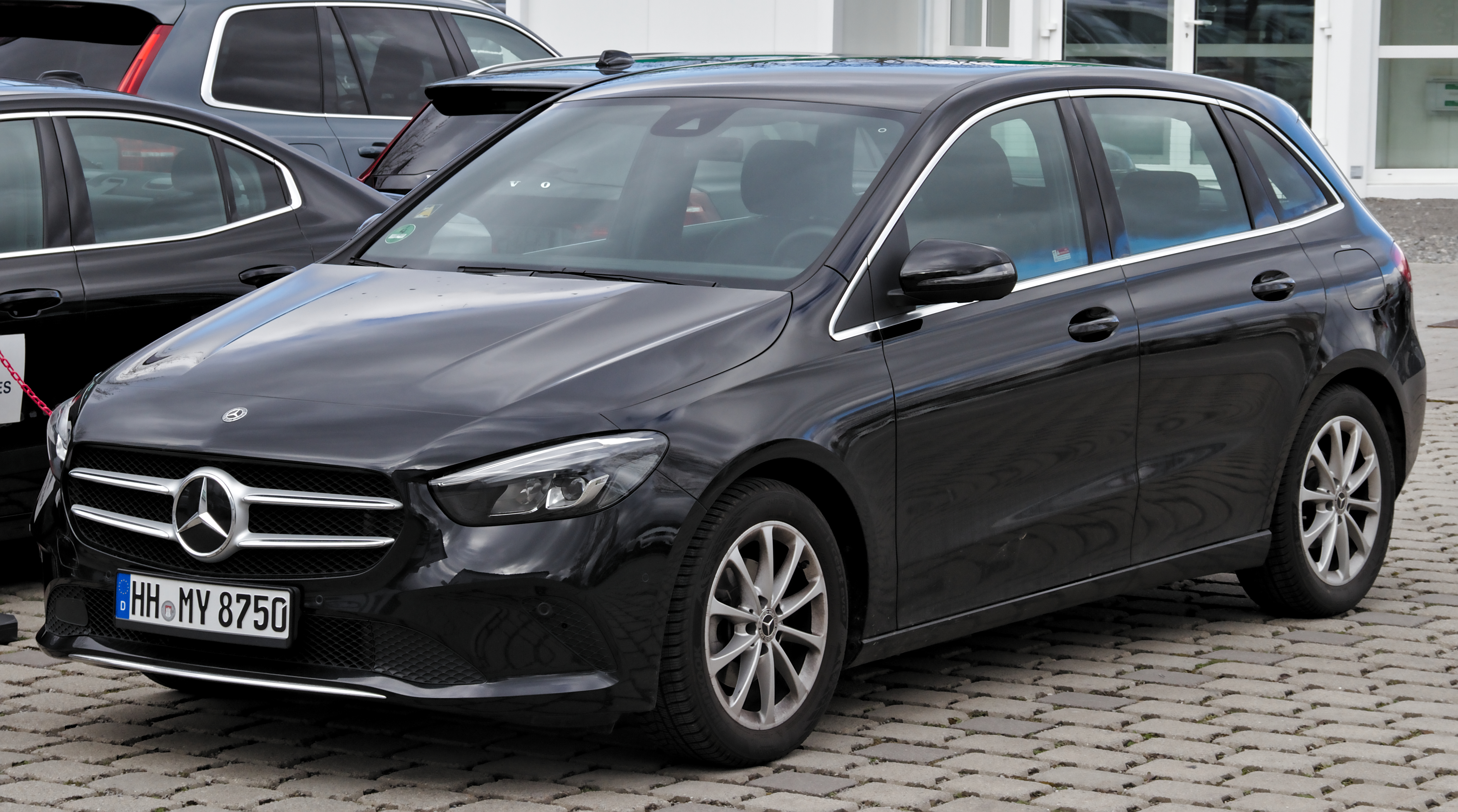

Overview
- Model code: W247
- Production: December 2018 – 2026
- Model years: 2019–2026
- Assembly: Germany: Rastatt; Hungary: Kecskemét
- Designer: Slavche Tanevski

Body and chassis
- Platform: MFA2
- Related: A-Class (W177); GLA-Class (H247); CLA-Class (C118); GLB-Class (X247)

Powertrain
- Engine: Petrol: 1.3 L M282 turbo I4; 2.0 L M260 turbo I4; Petrol plug-in hybrid: 1.3 L M282 turbo I4; Diesel: 1.5 L OM608 turbo I4; 2.0 L OM654 turbo I4
- Transmission: 6-speed manual (2018–2023); 7-speed DCT 7G-DCT; 8-speed DCT 8G-DCT
- Hybrid drivetrain: Mild Hybrid; Plug-in hybrid (B 250 e)
- Battery: 15.6 kWh lithium-ion (Plug-in hybrid)

Dimensions
- Wheelbase: 2,729 mm (107.4 in)
- Length: 4,419 mm (174.0 in)
- Width: 1,796 mm (70.7 in)
- Height: 1,562 mm (61.5 in)
- Curb weight: 1,385–1,725 kg (3,053–3,803 lb)

The third generation B-Class was launched at the Paris Motor Show on 2 October 2018. At launch, the vehicle was claimed to feature the Intelligent Drive semi-automated driving system borrowed from the S-Class.

The design was improved with a much shorter front overhang. The controversial sculpting on the side part of the vehicle was not carried over to the W247 B-Class. Three infotainment system options is available, with entry-level models getting dual seven-inch displays. A seven-inch display with the larger 10.25-inch display is available, with top-tier models getting a pair of the large displays. It is powered by a full MBUX infotainment system, giving B-Class buyers access to its functions through a standard touchscreen. Features such as intelligent voice control, augmented reality, and a head-up display are optional. The all-electric configuration was removed, but a plug-in hybrid option was introduced. The plug-in hybrid comes with a 10.9 kWh battery which optionally supports DC charging and provides a WLTP combined cycle range of 66 km.

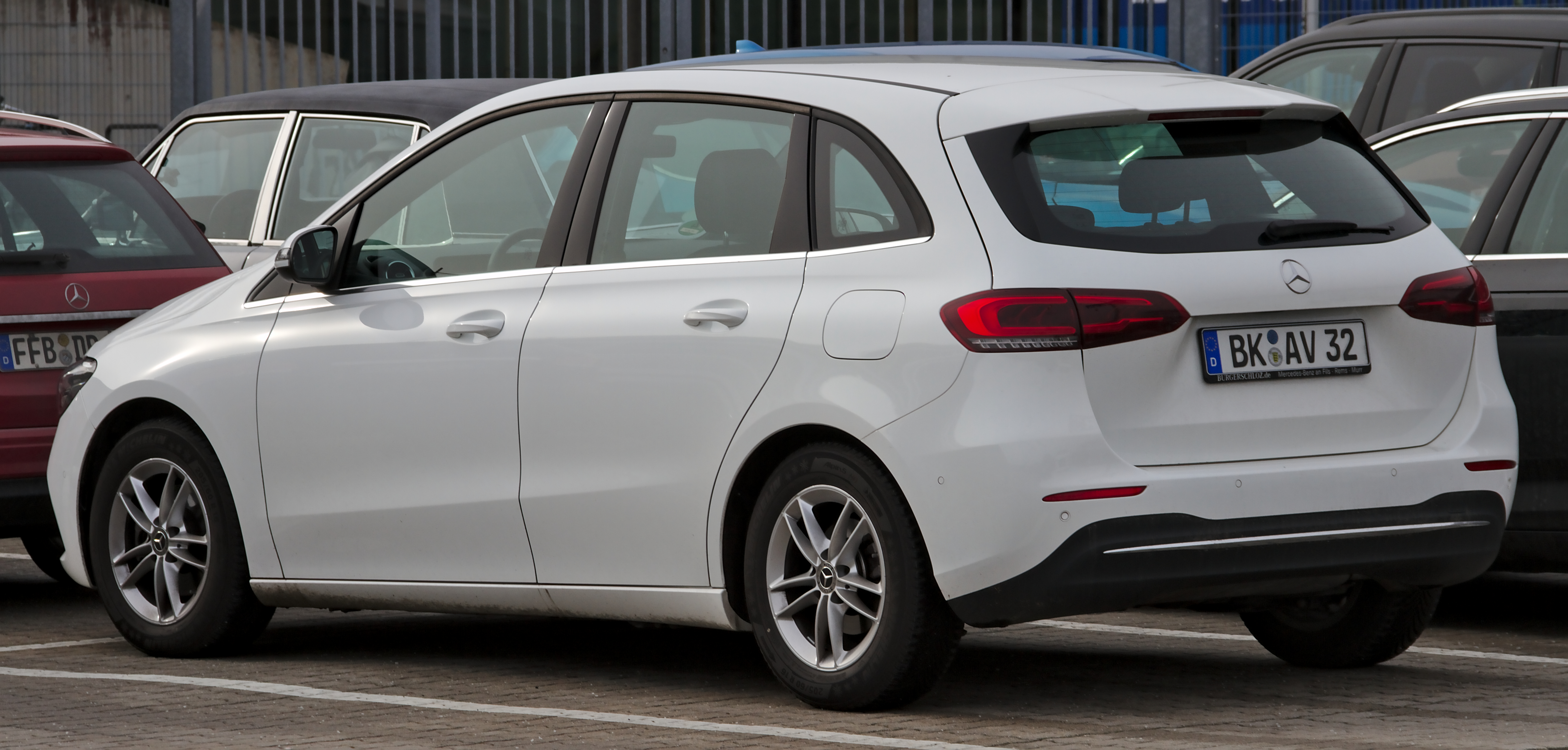
Rear view

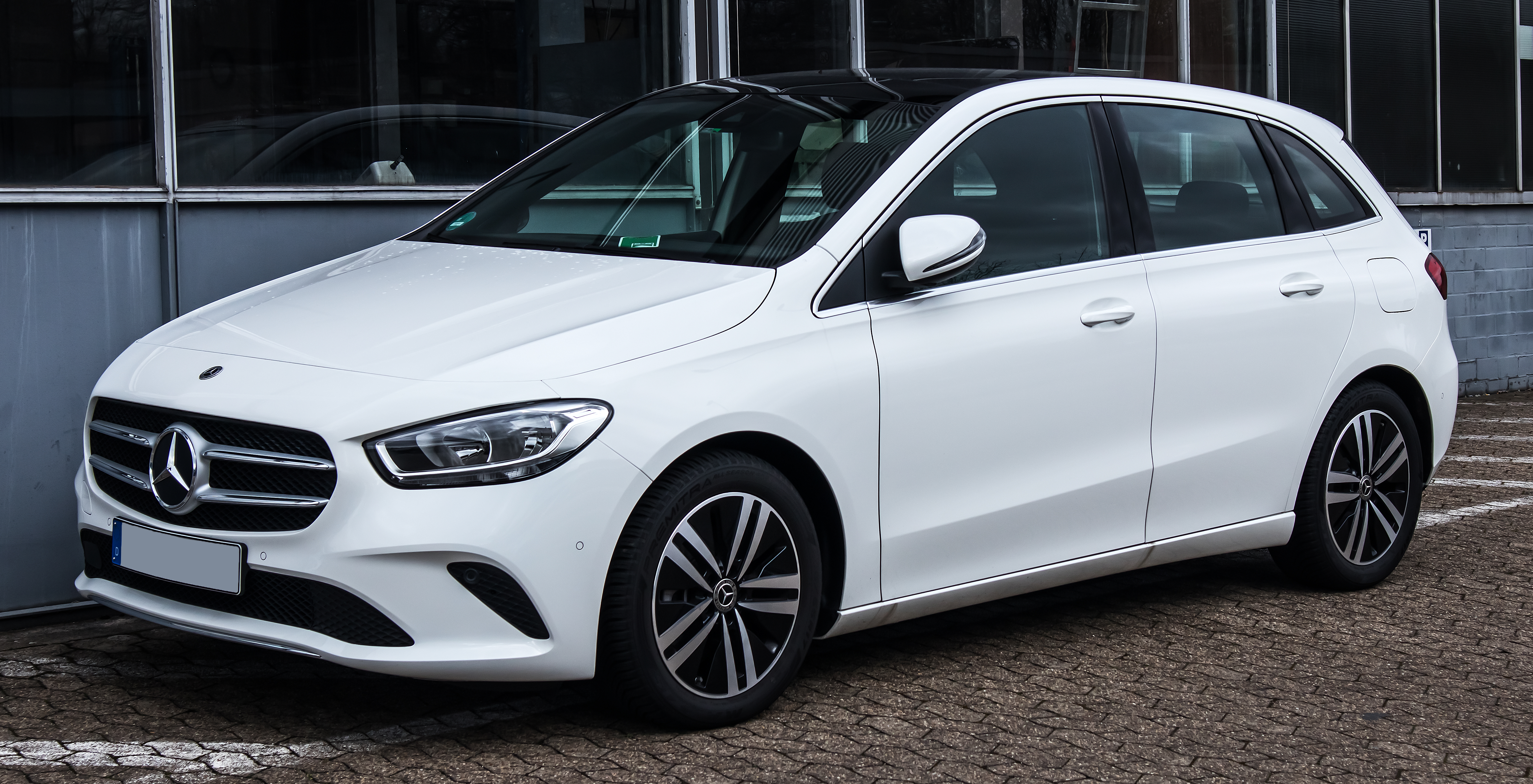
Progressive (front)

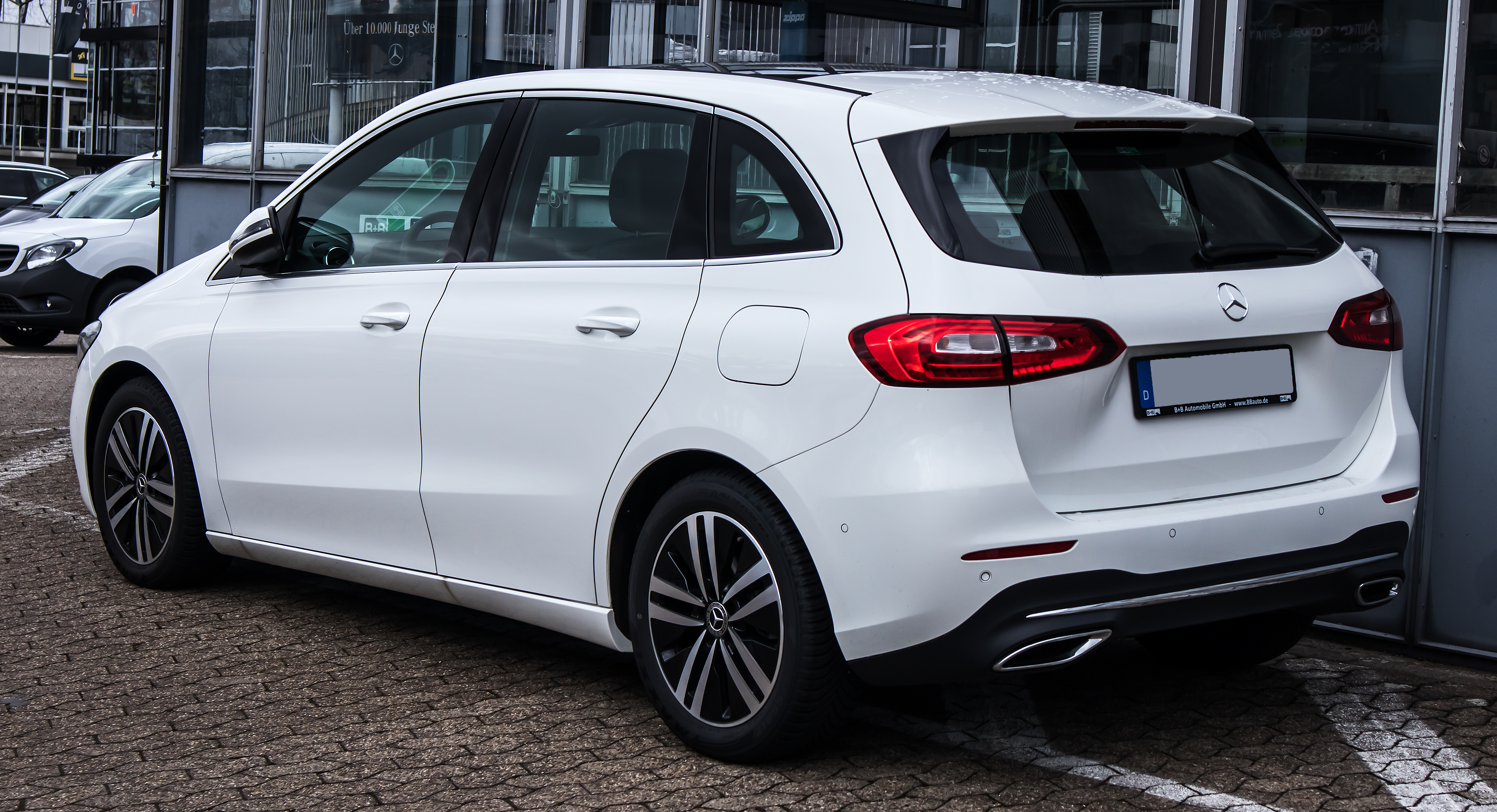
Progressive (rear)

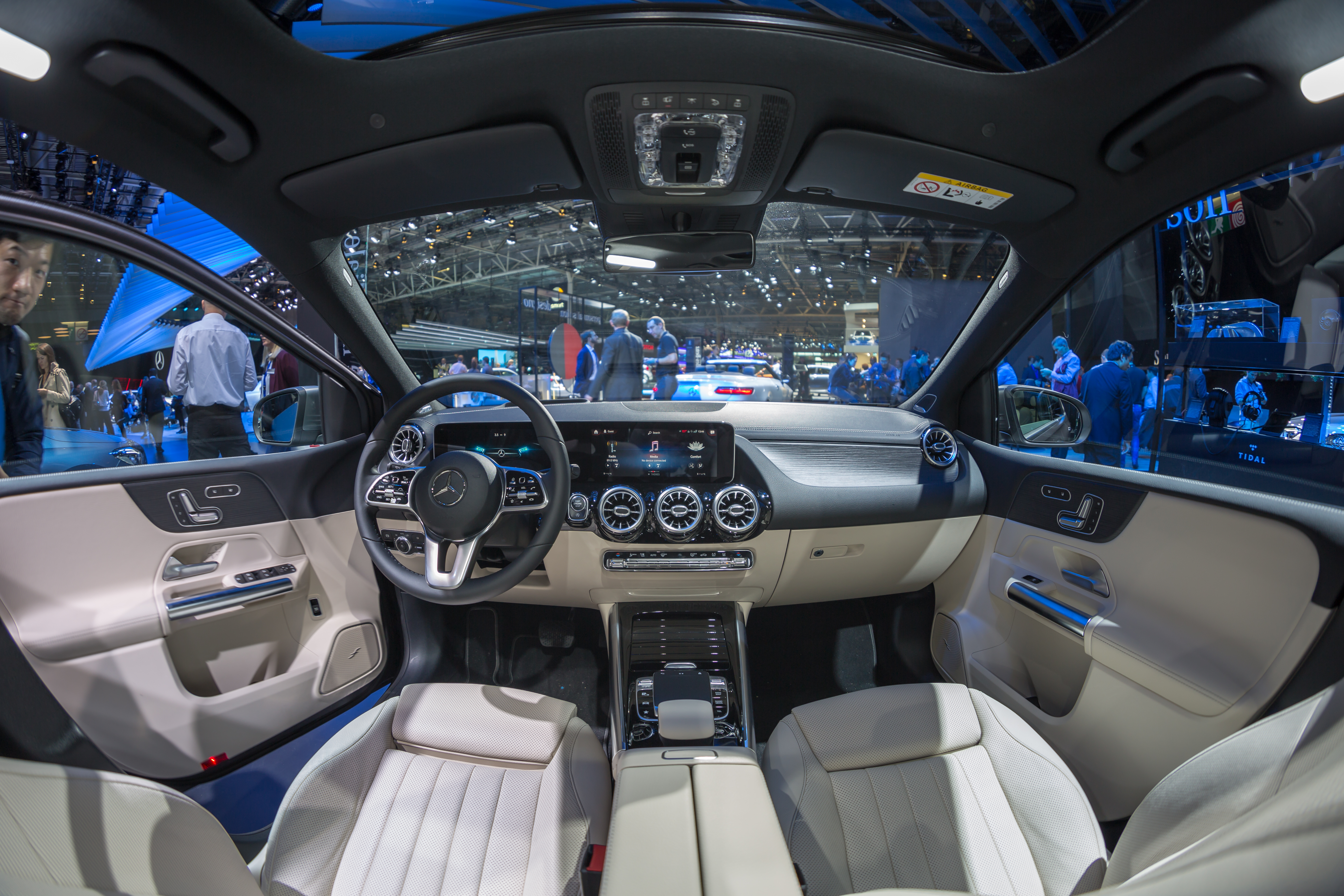
Interior (pre-update)

=== 2022 facelift ===
In 2022, the B-Class had received a facelift for the 2023 model year. With close resemblance to the W177 update, the B-Class includes minor differences to the headlights with significant changes to the taillights, along with a changed interior, and improved infotainment adding the newest iteration of the Mercedes-Benz MBUX system. It also removed the manual transmission, alongside the A-Class and CLA as part of Mercedes-Benz's plan to retire manual transmissions.

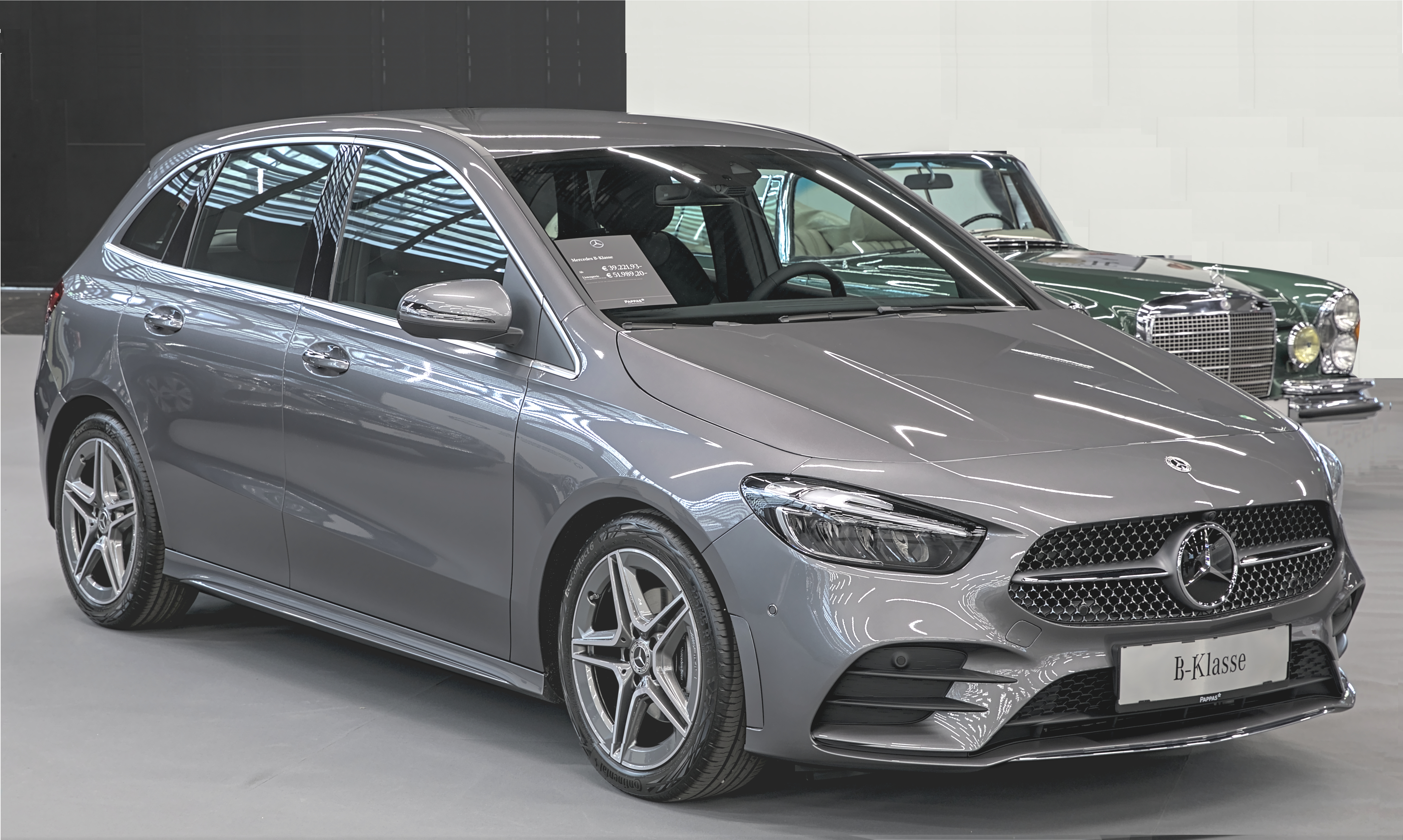
2023 facelift (AMG line)

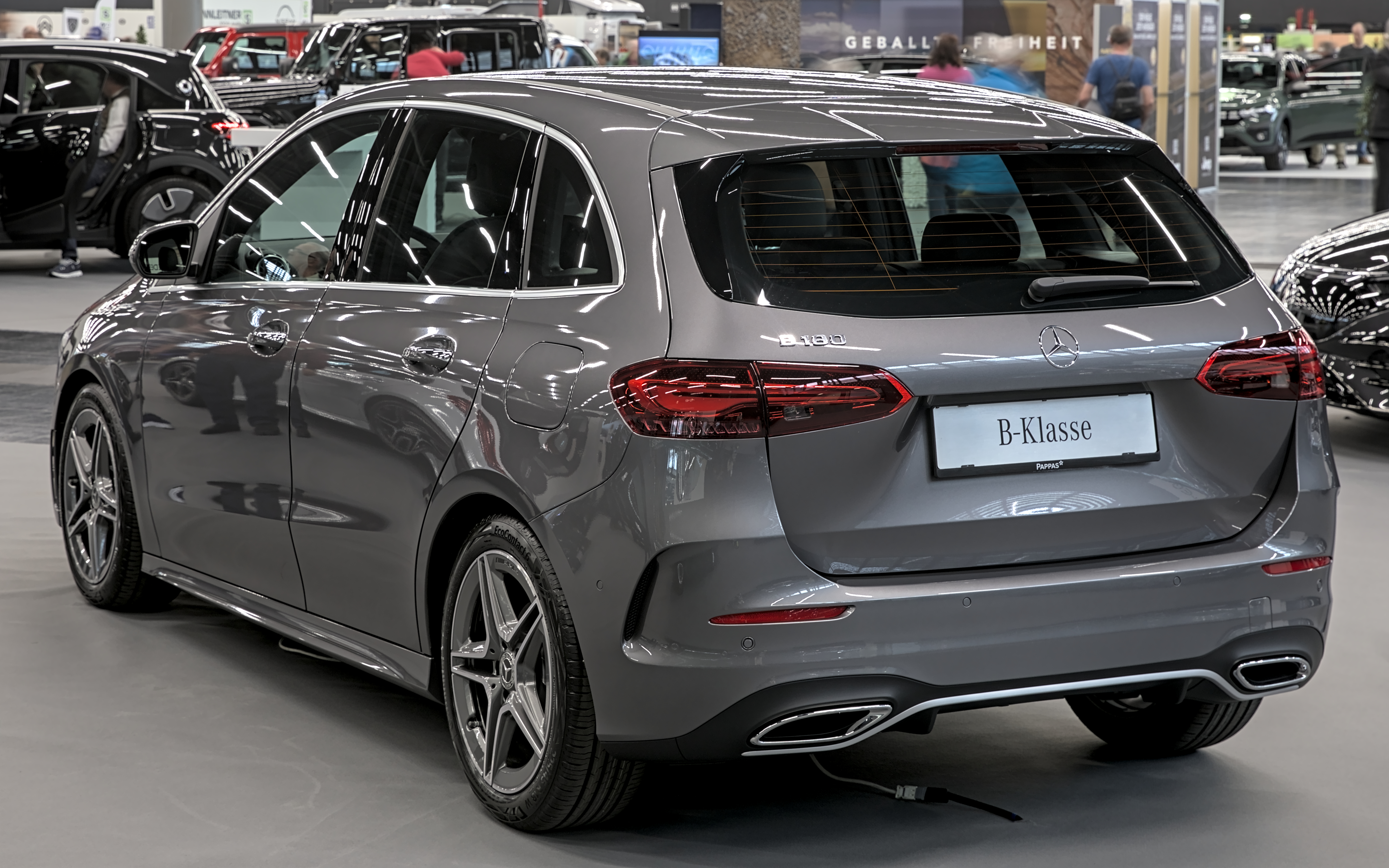
Rear

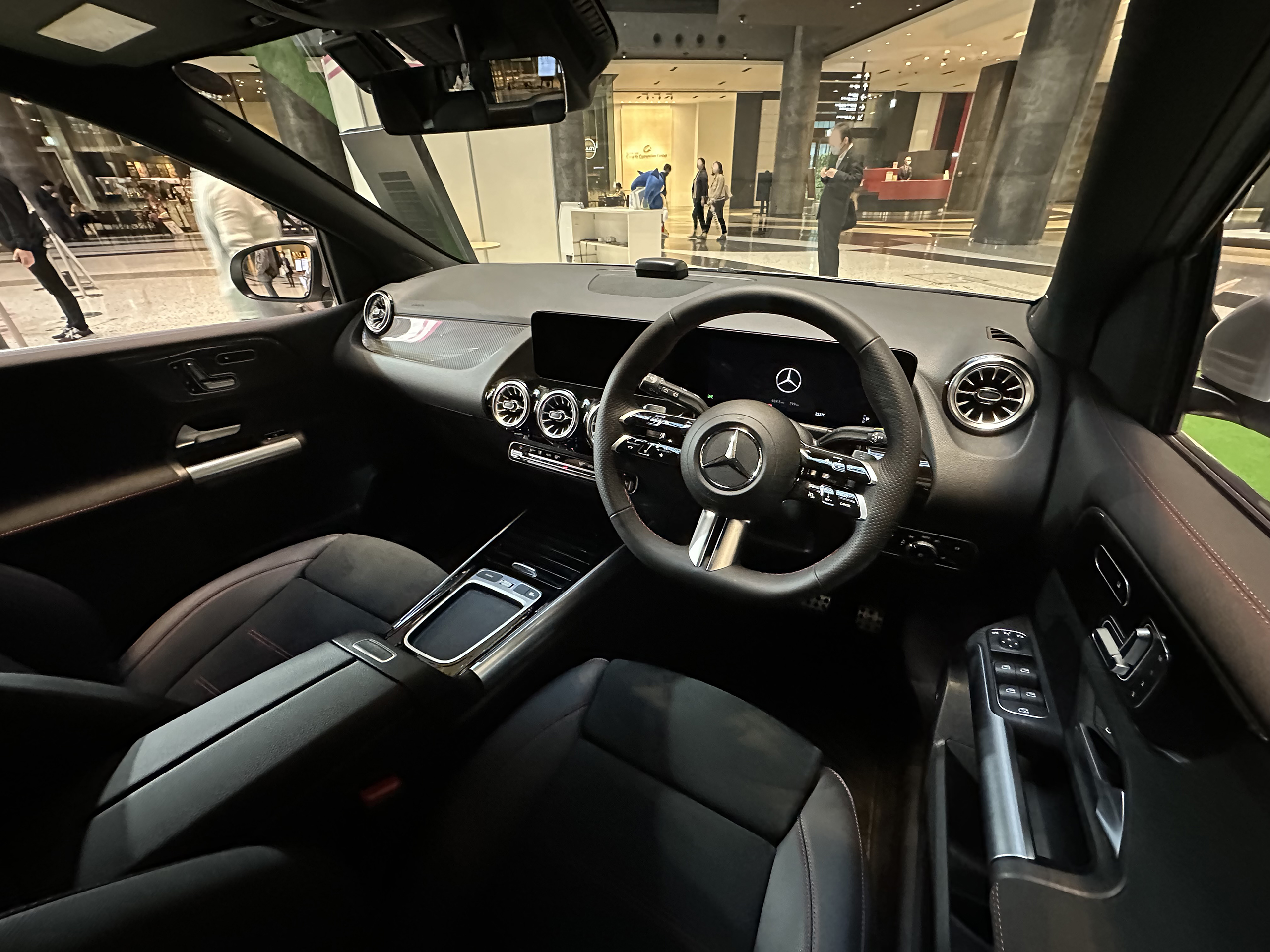
Interior update

=== Engines ===
The hatchback has slightly updated models from pre-facelift and facelift. The AWD models uses Mercedes’ four-wheel drive technology called ‘4Matic’, and with the facelift, petrol models use a 48-volt mild hybrid system.

==== Pre-facelift models (2018–2022) ====
Engines (W247)
Spec Model	Engine	Power	Torque	Displacement	Top speed	Transmission	Acceleration (0-60/100)	Drive
Petrol models
B 160	1.3 L M282 turbo I4	80 kW (109 PS; 108 hp)	180 N⋅m (133 lb⋅ft)	1,332 cc (81.3 cu in)	198 km/h (123 mph)	6-speed manual	11.3 sec	FWD
B 180	1.3 L M282 turbo I4	100 kW (136 PS; 134 hp)	200 N⋅m (148 lb⋅ft) at 1460	1,332 cc (81.3 cu in)	212 km/h (132 mph)	6-speed manual 7-speed dual-clutch	9.4 sec 9.0 sec (DCT models)	FWD
B 200	1.3 L M282 turbo I4	120 kW (163 PS; 161 hp)	250 N⋅m (184 lb⋅ft) at 1630	1,332 cc (81.3 cu in)	223 km/h (139 mph)	6-speed manual 7 or 8-speed dual-clutch	8.5 sec 8.2 sec (DCT)	FWD; AWD (8-sp. DCT)
B 220	2.0 L M260 turbo I4	140 kW (190 PS; 187 hp)	300 N⋅m (221 lb⋅ft)	1,991 cc (121.5 cu in)	239 km/h (149 mph)	7-speed dual-clutch	7.1 sec	FWD; AWD (DCT)
B 250	2.0 L M260 turbo I4	165 kW (224 PS; 221 hp)	350 N⋅m (258 lb⋅ft) at 1800	1,991 cc (121.5 cu in)	250 km/h (155 mph)	7-speed dual-clutch	7.1 sec	FWD; AWD
Diesel models
B 180 d		85 kW (116 PS; 114 hp) at 3400	260 N⋅m (192 lb⋅ft) at 1750		200 km/h (124 mph)	6-speed manual 7 or 8-speed dual-clutch	10.4 sec	FWD
B 200 d	2.0 L OM654 turbo I4	110 kW (150 PS; 148 hp)	320 N⋅m (236 lb⋅ft)	1,950 cc (119.0 cu in)	219 km/h (136 mph)	7 or 8-speed dual-clutch	8.3 sec	FWD; AWD
B 220 d	2.0 L OM654 turbo I4	140 kW (190 PS; 187 hp)	400 N⋅m (295 lb⋅ft)	1,950 cc (119.0 cu in)	234 km/h (145 mph)	7 or 8-speed dual-clutch	7.2 sec	FWD; AWD (8-sp. DCT)
Plug-in hybrid models
B 250 e	1.3 L M282 turbo I4	118 kW (160 PS; 158 hp) at 5500	230 N⋅m (170 lb⋅ft)	1,332 cc (81.3 cu in)	235 km/h (146 mph)	8-speed dual-clutch	6.8 sec	FWD

Electric details
Spec Model	All-electric range (WLTP)	All-electric range (NEDC)	Electric motor power	Electric motor torque	Electric top speed	Battery
B 250 e	56–67 km (35–42 mi)	70–77 km (43–48 mi)	75 kW (102 PS; 101 hp)	330 N⋅m (243 lb⋅ft)	140 km/h (87 mph)	15.6 kWh lithium-ion

==== Facelift models (2023–present) ====
Engines (W247 facelift)
Spec Model	Engine	Power	Torque	Displacement	Top speed	Transmission	Acceleration (0-60/100)	Drive
Petrol models
B 180	1.3 L M282 turbo I4	100 kW (136 PS; 134 hp)	200 N⋅m (148 lb⋅ft)	1,332 cc (81.3 cu in)	212 km/h (132 mph)	7-speed dual-clutch	9.0 sec	FWD
B 200	1.3 L M282 turbo I4	120 kW (163 PS; 161 hp)	270 N⋅m (199 lb⋅ft)	1,332 cc (81.3 cu in)	223 km/h (139 mph)	7-speed dual-clutch	8.4 sec	FWD
B 220	2.0 L M260 turbo I4	140 kW (190 PS; 187 hp)	300 N⋅m (221 lb⋅ft)	1,991 cc (121.5 cu in)	234 km/h (145 mph)	8-speed dual-clutch	7.3 sec	AWD
B 250	2.0 L M260 turbo I4	165 kW (224 PS; 221 hp)	350 N⋅m (258 lb⋅ft)	1,991 cc (121.5 cu in)	250 km/h (155 mph)	8-speed dual-clutch	6.5 sec	AWD
Diesel models
B 180 d	2.0 L OM654 turbo I4	85 kW (116 PS; 114 hp)	280 N⋅m (207 lb⋅ft)	1,991 cc (121.5 cu in)	200 km/h (124 mph)	8-speed dual-clutch		FWD
B 200 d	2.0 L OM654 turbo I4	110 kW (150 PS; 148 hp)	320 N⋅m (236 lb⋅ft)	1,991 cc (121.5 cu in)	219 km/h (136 mph)	8-speed dual-clutch	8.5 sec	FWD
B 220 d	2.0 L OM654 turbo I4	140 kW (190 PS; 187 hp)	400 N⋅m (295 lb⋅ft)	1,991 cc (121.5 cu in)	234 km/h (145 mph)	8-speed dual-clutch	7.4 sec	FWD
Plug-in hybrid models
B 250 e	1.3 L M282 turbo I4	160 kW (218 PS; 215 hp)	270 N⋅m (199 lb⋅ft)	1,332 cc (81.3 cu in)	223 km/h (139 mph)	8-speed dual-clutch	7.6 sec	FWD

Electric details
Spec Model	All-electric range (WLTP)	All-electric range (NEDC)	Electric motor power	Electric motor torque	Electric top speed	Battery
B 180, B 200, B 220, B 250	N/A	N/A	10 kW (14 PS; 14 hp)	150 N⋅m (111 lb⋅ft)	N/A	N/A
B 250 e	67–77 km (42–48 mi)	N/A	80 kW (109 PS; 108 hp)	300 N⋅m (221 lb⋅ft)	N/A	15.6 kWh lithium-ion

=== Safety ===
Euro NCAP test results Mercedes-Benz B180 Progressive Line (LHD) (2019)
Test	Points	%
Overall:	5 /5 stars	
Adult occupant:	36.6	96%
Child occupant:	44.5	90%
Pedestrian:	37.7	78%
Safety assist:	9.8	75%

ANCAP test results Mercedes-Benz B-Class (2019, aligned with Euro NCAP)
Test	Points	%
Overall:	5 /5 stars	
Adult occupant:	36.6	96%
Child occupant:	45.4	92%
Pedestrian:	37.7	78%
Safety assist:	10	77%

== Sales ==
Year	Europe	Canada	U.S.	Mexico	Australia	South Africa
2005	52,942					
2006	114,766	2,617				
2007	108,699	3,035				
2008	101,072	3,207				
2009	86,073	2,865				
2010	82,844	2,994				
2011	64,198	2,218				
2012	119,871	1,523				
2013	100,533	3,207				
2014	83,597	2,695	774		2,364	2,002
2015	79,721	2,423	1,906		1,967	1,377
2016	73,768	2,461	632		1,849	1,192
2017	64,683	2,369	744		1,330	338
2018	61,022	1,622			844	113
2019	73,997	306		193	1,272	147
2020	44,664				513	86
2021	27,694				388	34
2022					284	
