= Paul Ts'o =

Hong Kong-born biophysical chemist (1929–2009)

Paul On Pong Ts'o (Chinese: 曹安邦; 17 July 1929 – 2 December 2009) was a Hong Kong-born biophysical chemist.

Paul On Pong Ts'o was born on 17 July 1929 in British Hong Kong to parents Paul S. F. Ts’o and Amy Hoh Ts'o. Ts'o's father was an Episcopalian clergyman. For a portion of the Second Sino-Japanese War, the Ts'o family resided in Guilin. The younger Paul Ts'o attended in Hong Kong's True Light School, where Amy Hoh Ts'o was principal. After graduating from Lingnan University in 1949, Paul O. P. Ts'o emigrated to the United States, where he earned a master's degree in at Michigan State University in 1951. He then completed a doctorate in biochemistry at Caltech, where he was advised by James F. Bonner, in 1955. Ts'o remained with the Bonnor laboratory for seven years as a research fellow, then joined the Johns Hopkins University faculty. He was appointed to a full professorship in 1967 and retired from teaching in 2002, thereafter a senior associate at Johns Hopkins. After leaving academia, Ts'o cofounded Genta, was chief executive and technology officer of Cell Works, Inc, and established Comprehensive Cancer Cell Diagnostics.

Ts'o was elected a member of Taiwan's Academia Sinica in 1972. His activities in Taiwan included chairing the Advisory Committee of the Academia Sinica's Molecular Biology Institute and organizing what became the Clinical Cancer Research Center. From 1994, Ts'o was convenor of the Academia Sinica's Medical Biotechnology Subcommittee.

Ts'o died on 2 December 2009 at Johns Hopkins Hospital, aged 80.

== Selected books ==
- Ts'o, Paul (1974). Basic Principles in Nucleic Acid Chemistry. Academic Press. ISBN 9780127019017.
- Ts'o, Paul; Gelboin, Harry (1978). Polycyclic Hydrocarbons and Cancer. Academic Press.
