= Lloyd Conover =

American inventor (1923–2017)

- Born: Lloyd Hillyard Conover; June 13, 1923; Orange, New Jersey, U.S.
- Died: March 11, 2017 (aged 93); St. Petersburg, Florida, U.S.
- Education: University of Rochester
- Occupation: Chemist
- Known for: Inventor of tetracycline
- Spouses: Virginia Kirk (m. 1944; died 1988); Marie Solomons; Katharine Meacham (m. 2005)

Lloyd Hillyard Conover (June 13, 1923 – March 11, 2017) was an American chemist and the inventor of tetracycline. For this invention, he was inducted into the National Inventors Hall of Fame. Conover was the first to make an antibiotic by chemically modifying a naturally produced drug. He had close to 300 patents to his name.

== Career ==
In 1941, Conover began studying chemistry at Amherst College, but his studies were interrupted by World War II. He then joined the Navy, serving three years in the Pacific on an amphibious landing ship, ultimately rising to the rank of lieutenant junior grade. After the war, he returned to Amherst, receiving his B.A. degree in 1947. He went on to earn his Ph.D. in chemistry from the University of Rochester in 1950.

Upon completion of his studies, Conover joined Pfizer's chemical research department. He was part of a team exploring the molecular architecture of the broad-spectrum antibiotics Terramycin and Aureomycin. Both of these drugs had been discovered as natural products produced by actinomycetes. Working in conjunction with Harvard Professor R.B. Woodward, the team began to recognize that it was possible to chemically alter an antibiotic to produce other antibiotics that were effective in treating various types of illnesses. In 1952, he developed tetracycline in this way. Specifically, he was able to produce tetracycline by dechlorinating Aureomycin by catalytic reduction, that is, by substituting hydrogen for chlorine in chlortetracycline. His success led to the process being used to produce other superior structurally modified antibiotics. This is a standard practice in the industry today.

Conover applied for a patent on tetracycline in 1953, and one was granted in 1955. Within three years, tetracycline became the most prescribed broad spectrum antibiotic in the U.S. During this time, the patent was challenged. In 1982, the courts upheld the patent and the right of scientists to patent based on similar methods.

In 1971, Conover became research director at Pfizer Central Research in Sandwich, England. In 1984, he retired as a senior vice president.

Conover died in St. Petersburg, Florida, at the age of 93.
