= Marcos TSO =

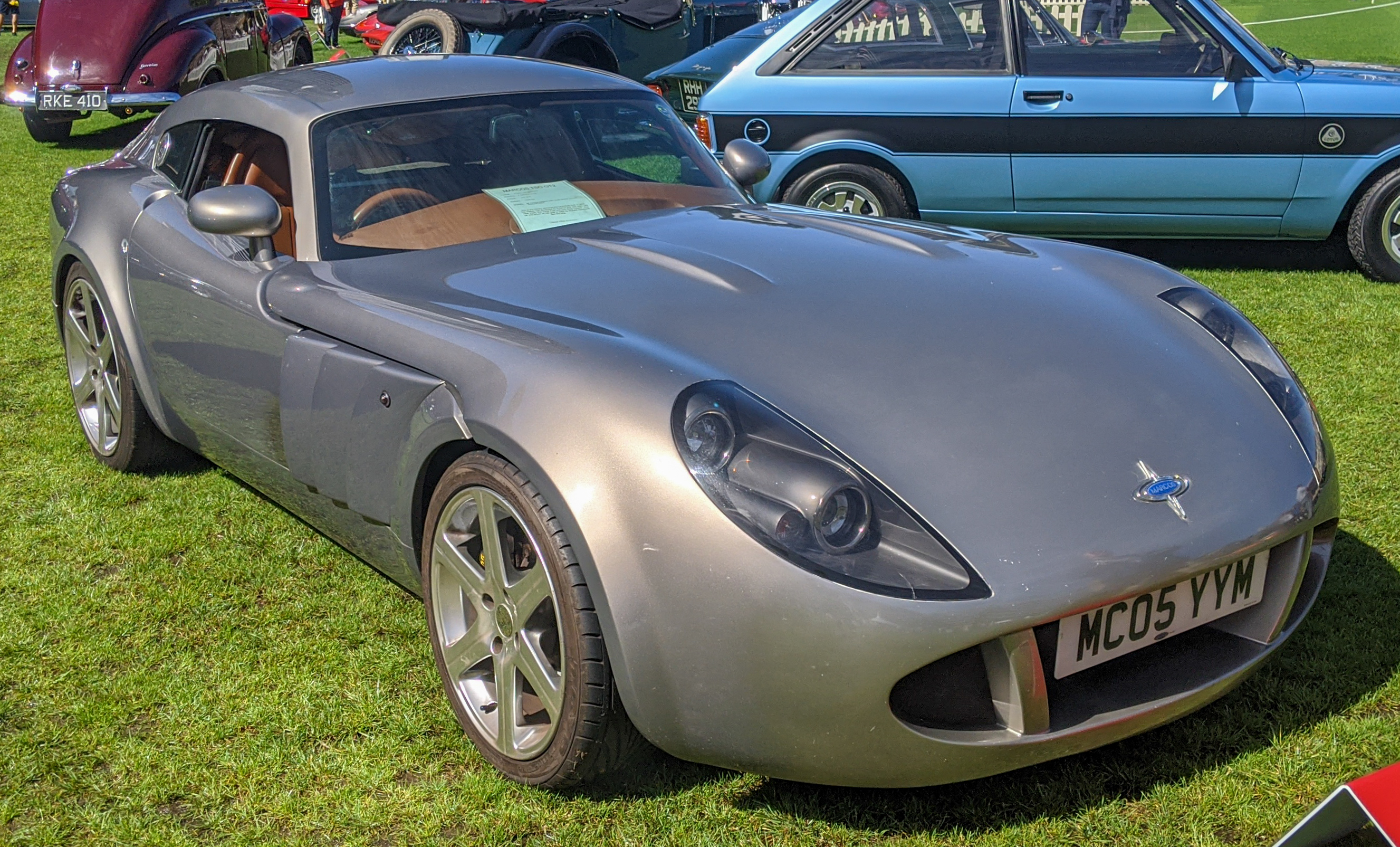
- 2005 Marcos TSO GT2 Prototype

Overview
- Manufacturer: Marcos
- Production: 2004–2007
- Designer: Damian McTaggart

Body and chassis
- Class: Sports car (S)
- Body style: Coupe

Powertrain
- Engine: 5.7 L V8
- Transmission: 6-speed manual

Dimensions
- Wheelbase: 2,280 mm (90 in)
- Length: 4,020 mm (158 in)
- Width: 1,680 mm (66 in)
- Height: 1,150 mm (45 in)

The Marcos TSO is a sports car manufactured between 2004 and 2007 by Marcos. It features a Chevrolet V8 engine in either 350 bhp (261 kW) or 400 bhp (298 kW) versions. The car's components were CAD designed in England, with chassis engineering carried out by Prodrive.

In 2004, the 5.7-litre Chevrolet Corvette (LS1) V8 TSO GT was announced, but solely for the Australian market. It was joined in 2005 by the GT2 for the European market. The T50 GT2 was tested on British Motoring Show Top Gear by presenter Richard Hammond, the episode airing in December 2005. Hammond broadly praised the car as a mix a of an American muscle car and a traditional British Sports car, though criticised its reliability issues and tendency to oversteer. The car completed a lap of the track in 1:28.2.

In 2006 Marcos announced the TSO GTC, a modified version of the current TSO with a racing suspension, racing brakes and a rear diffuser. The car still featured a Chevrolet-sourced 420 bhp (313 kW) V8. A 462 bhp (345 kW) Performance Pack was also available. With the extra power from the Performance Pack the TSO GTC accelerated to 60 mph (97 km/h) in 4.1 seconds and to 100 mph (161 km/h) in 8.5 seconds. With the bigger brakes, 340 mm AP Racing brakes, the TSO GTC delivered a 0-100-0 time of 12.9 seconds. With the extra power, its 50 to 70 mph (110 km/h) time was 2.1 seconds. Top speed was over 185 mph (298 km/h).

Marcos Engineering Ltd went into administration on 9 October 2007. Only 5 or 6 road cars were produced, some incomplete.

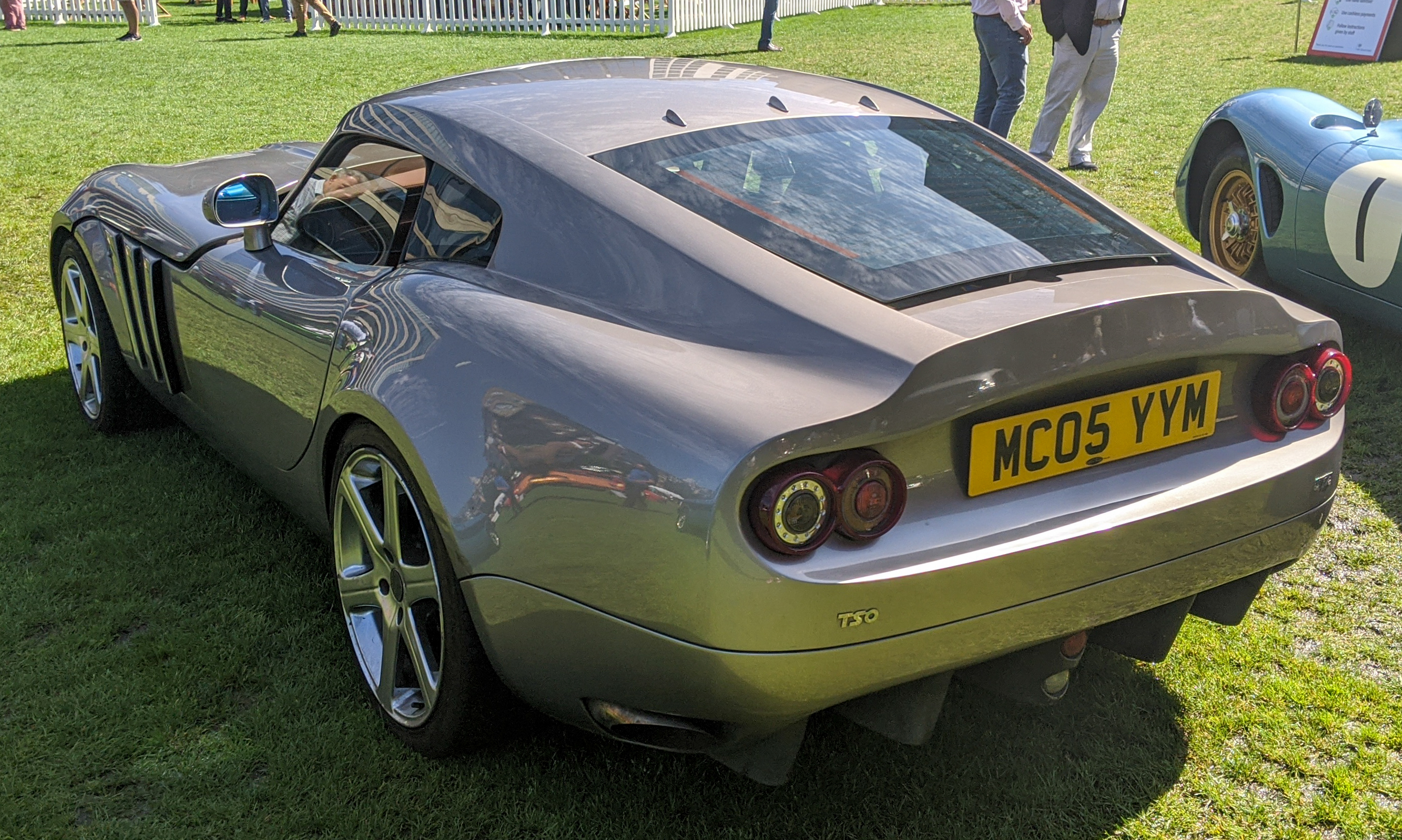
Rear

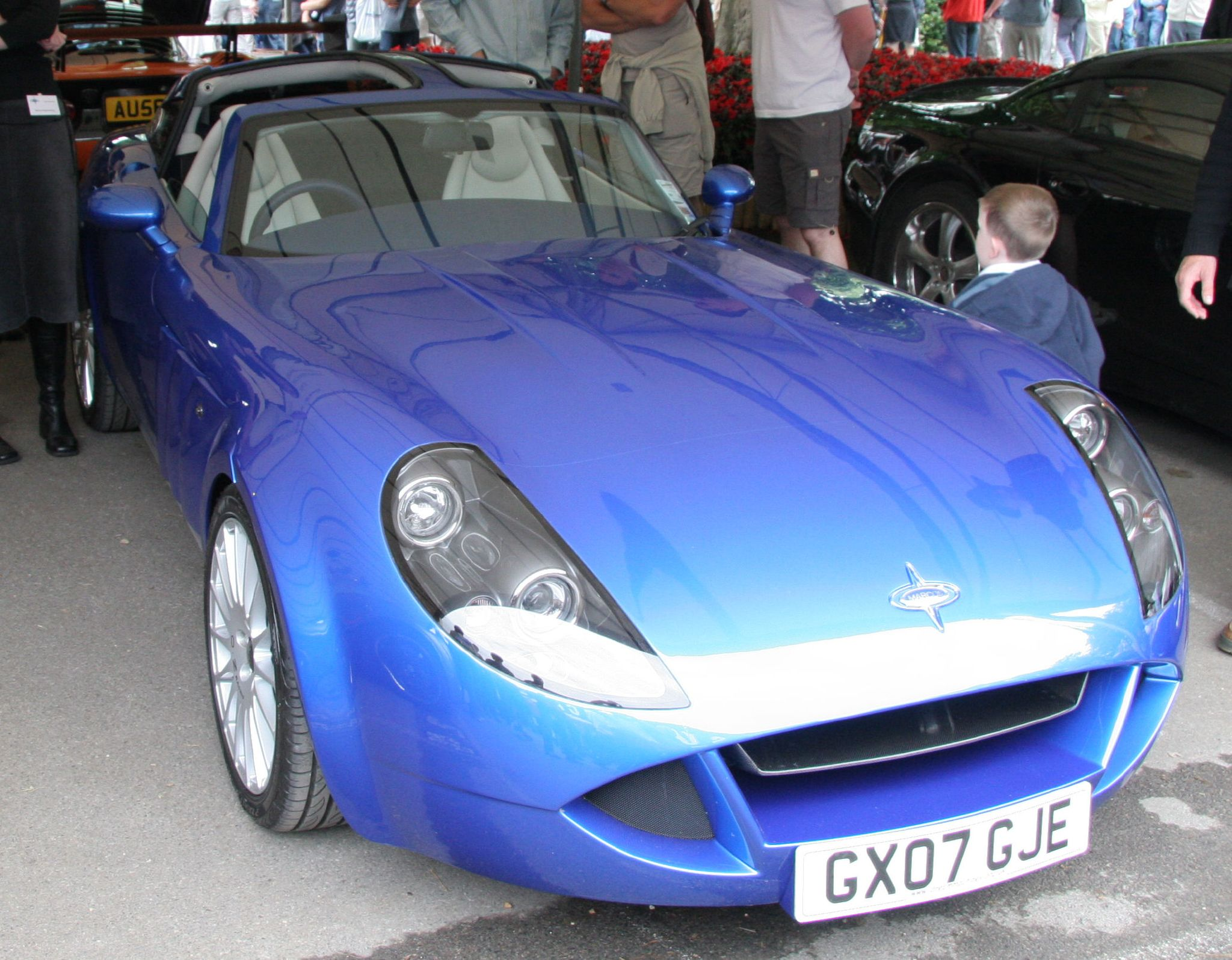
Marcos GT2
