= Harry Gelboin =

American cancer researcher

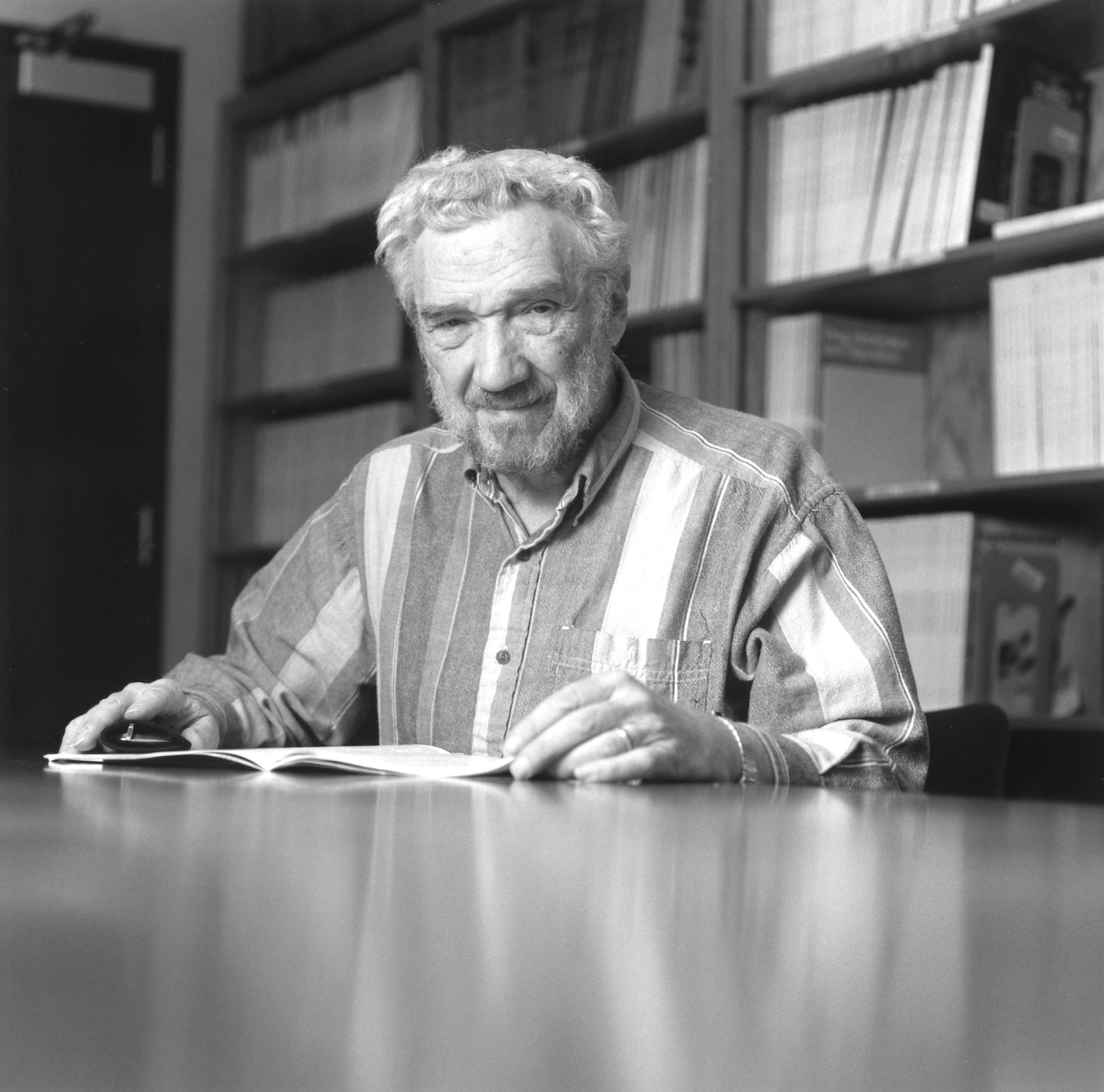
Harry V. Gelboin

Harry V. Gelboin (1929–2010) was an American cancer research scientist, particularly in chemical carcinogenesis. From 1966 to 1999, he was Chief of the Laboratory of Molecular Carcinogenics (now called the Laboratory of Metabolism) at the National Cancer Institute (NCI), part of the National Institutes of Health (NIH). His research focused on the activation and detoxification of drugs and carcinogens. He is best known for his studies of the genetic mechanisms by which normal cells transform into malignancy, which constituted a major advance in cancer research.

== Biography ==
Gelboin was born in Chicago in 1929, the oldest child of Eva (Jurkowsky/Jerkowsky) and Herman Gelboim, recent immigrants from Poland and Russia. He had one younger sister, Helen Friedman. He grew up in a working class Jewish family in the Humboldt Park section of Chicago. His parents ran a stall and later a store at Chicago's Maxwell Street market.

He attended Chicago public schools, graduating from Tuley High School. He received a B.S. in Chemistry from the University of Illinois (3 years at University of Illinois at Navy Pier and 1 year at University of Illinois, Urbana-Champaign), and after graduation briefly worked as a chemist for the U.S. Rubber Company. Gelboin subsequently earned a PhD in Biochemistry and Oncology from the McArdle Laboratory for Cancer Research at the University of Wisconsin-Madison, where he was mentored by James and Elizabeth Miller.

Gelboin accepted a position at the National Institutes of Health (NIH) in 1958, initially working with Louis Sokoloff and Giulio Cantoni at the National Institute of Mental Health. From 1966 to 1999, he served as Chief of the Laboratory of Molecular Carcinogenesis (now called the Laboratory of Metabolism) at the National Cancer Institute (NCI).

Gelboin died in Chevy Chase on April 13, 2010, of lymphoma.

== Research contributions ==
Gelboin's research at NCI centered on working out how the body metabolizes environmental carcinogens, for example, benzopyrene, which occurs in tobacco smoke, auto exhaust, and other smoke-producing sources. Gelboin's laboratory identified the genes for the many cytochrome P-450 enzymes that detoxify various environmental carcinogens. These enzymes break down hazardous chemicals into molecules that can be safely excreted by the kidney. He developed the foundation for a genetic profile that could screen individuals for susceptibility to certain carcinogens, foods, and drugs.

Gelboin pioneered early research on how chemicals, drugs, and carcinogens are metabolized by enzymes in small lipid vesicles (microsomes) in the liver. He demonstrated that microsomal enzymes convert certain carcinogens to a form that tightly bound to DNA, and he then showed that those enzymes were of the cytochrome P-450 class. That finding revealed how pro-carcinogens can be converted in the body to substances that damage DNA and that can lead to mutations or cancer.

He developed monoclonal antibodies to the cytochrome P-450 enzymes and, not only used them for research in his laboratory, but distributed them worldwide to allow other laboratories and pharmaceutical companies to use them in their development of new drugs.

His work served as the foundation for the concept of in vitro activation of procarcinogens to substances that damage DNA, which was the basis for a widely used test of chemicals for their cancer-producing potential (the Ames test). His laboratory was the first to introduce high-performance liquid chromatography to the study of metabolism (chemical conversions in the body) of certain hazardous chemicals to which people may be exposed. His work had a huge impact on the fields of chemical carcinogenesis, drug and carcinogen metabolism, and on studies of the cytochrome P-450 drug and carcinogen metabolizing enzymes.

Gelboin authored or co-authored over 400 scientific papers in medical publications, edited/co-edited nine books and held eight patents. From 1965-1978, he was among the 300 most cited scientists in the world, and from 1973-1982 he was among the 500 most cited scientists in the world. He lectured extensively throughout the United States and in 26 foreign countries.

After his retirement in 2000, Gelboin continued working actively as a Scientist Emeritus in the Laboratory of Metabolism.

Gelboin has left behind a number of former colleagues and trainees now working at laboratories around the world, many of whom have achieved leadership positions in the areas of drug and carcinogen metabolism and who continue to carry out his legacy of scientific inquiry.

== Awards ==
Gelboin received numerous awards, including four NIH Merit awards, a technology transfer award, an honorary D.Sc. degree, a Nakasone Lecture Award and a Claude Bernard Award. He presented many keynote lectures, organized research conferences, participated in the work of several committees that evaluated research proposals, and edited several books on chemical carcinogenesis. One of his publications, a paper on development of a widely used assay for a key enzyme in the metabolism of carcinogens, became an Institute for Scientific Exchange Citation Classic.

== Selected publications ==
- "Cytochrome P450 Mediated Drug and Carcinogen Metabolism using Monoclonal Antibodies". home.ccr.cancer.gov.
- Yang, Tian J.; Krausz, Kristopher W.; Sai, Yang; Gonzalez, Frank J.; Gelboin, Harry V. (1999-01-01). "Eight Inhibitory Monoclonal Antibodies Define the Role of Individual P-450s in Human Liver Microsomal Diazepam, 7-Ethoxycoumarin, and Imipramine Metabolism". Drug Metabolism and Disposition. 27 (1): 102–109. doi:10.1016/S0090-9556(24)14891-X. ISSN 0090-9556. PMID 9884317.
- "Harry V. Gelboin's research works | National Institutes of Health, MD (NIH) and other places".
- Gonzalez, F. J.; Conney, A. H. (2010-07-01). "Harry V. Gelboin, 1929-2010". Carcinogenesis. 31 (7): 1308–1309. doi:10.1093/carcin/bgq093. ISSN 0143-3334.
- "Polycyclic Hydrocarbons and Cancer. Harry V. Gelboin and Paul O. P. Ts'o, Editors. Volume 1. Environment, Chemistry, and Metabolism, 408 pp, $37.50; Volume 2. Molecular and Cell Biology, 452 pp, $42.00, Academic Press, New York, 1978". Journal of Occupational and Environmental Medicine. 21 (6): 393. June 1979. ISSN 1076-2752.
