= Trafikmagasinet =

- Country of origin: Sweden
- Original language: Swedish

Original release
- Network: SVT
- Release: 15 March 1978 – 29 December 2003

Trafikmagasinet (The traffic magazine) was a Swedish TV-show about traffic and motoring, broadcast on the Swedish public service network SVT from 1978 to 2003. Aside from reviewing new cars (which were graded by awarding "steering wheels"), Trafikmagasinet featured news, educational content, and consumer reports. The show was created by Carl Ingemar Perstad who also hosted the show until 2002. Christer Glenning co-hosted the show and was responsible for car testing until his death in 1998.

== History ==
Trafikmagasinet launched on 15 March 1978. The show was an immediate success and its ratings were higher than many popular entertainment shows. Internationally, the show was a pioneer. The type of road tests first introduced in Trafikmagasinet became very popular and used by motor journalists in several countries.

Beside the TV-audience, journalists and car industry looked upon Trafikmagasinet with high confidence. In 1987 Carl-Ingemar Perstad received an award from the Swedish Royal Automobile Club for his contribution to enhance and improve the level of Swedish road and traffic safety.

An important event in the show's history was when a Škoda failed miserably in a road test, flipping over while turning in 30 km/h. History repeated itself in 1997, when Trafikmagasinet together with the car magazine Teknikens Värld overturned the new Mercedes-Benz A-Class during testing. Mercedes-Benz initially claimed that the car had been manipulated and threatened to sue the journalists, but finally had to admit that the car was unsafe during sharp turns at high speed. The A-Class was re-released with Electronic Stability Control, and the episode gave some fame to the expression moose test - this due to Mercedes-Benz' initial attempt to ridicule the failed test and claim that it was only of interest to Swedes.

During the 1990s and onward new co-hosts joined Trafikmagasinet. Sofia Lindahl was followed by Bodil Karlsson and later Veronica Marklund. When Christer Glenning died in 1998, Staffan Borglund replaced him as car tester.

During its last year, Trafikmagasinet left the studio-based concept. The show was one of many that were axed when SVT were forced to make major budget-cuts in 2003.
