= Citroën Xantia =

Large family car

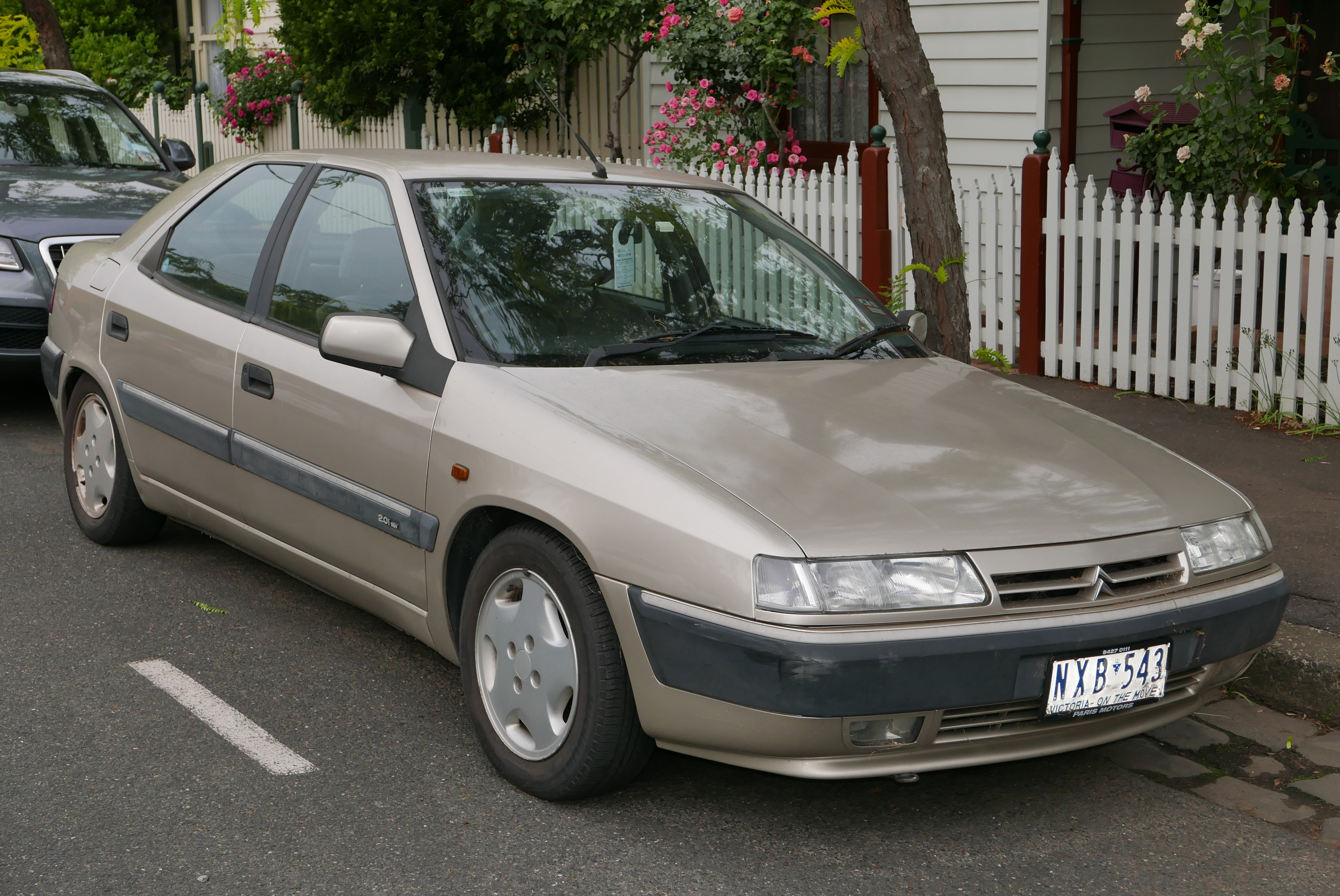

Overview
- Manufacturer: Citroën
- Also called: Saipa Citroën Xantia (Iran); Fengshen Xuetielong XM (China)
- Production: 1992–2001 (France); 2001–2010 (Iran); 1996–1997 (China)
- Assembly: France: PSA Rennes Plant; France: Cerizay (Heuliez: Xantia Break); Iran: Tehran (Saipa Motor Corporation); China: Huizhou, Guangdong (CKD)
- Designer: Bertone

Body and chassis
- Class: Large family car (D)
- Body style: 5-door hatchback (Berline); 5-door estate (Break)
- Layout: FF layout
- Related: Peugeot 406

Powertrain
- Engine: petrol: 1.6 L I4; 1.8 L I4; 1.8 L 16V I4; 2.0 L I4; 2.0 L 16V I4; 2.0 L turbo I4; 3.0 L V6; diesel: 1.9 L I4; 1.9 L turbo I4; 2.0 L I4; 2.1 L 12V turbo I4

Dimensions
- Wheelbase: 2,740 mm (108 in) (Berline)
- Length: 4,440 mm (175 in) (Berline)
- Width: 1,755 mm (69.1 in) (Berline)
- Height: 1,380 mm (54 in) (Berline)
- Curb weight: 1,250 kg (2,760 lb)–1,430 kg (3,150 lb) (Activa CT)

Chronology
- Predecessor: Citroën BX
- Successor: Citroën C5

The Citroën Xantia (pronounced "Zan–ti–a") is a large family car (D) produced by the French automaker Citroën, and designed by Bertone. Presented to the press in December 1992, the car was produced between 1992 and 2001 in France, with a facelift in the end of 1997.

The Citroën Xantia Activa V6 used to hold the record speed (85 km/h (53 mph)) through the moose test maneuver, due to its active anti-roll bars. This test is conducted by the magazine Teknikens Värld's, as a test of avoiding a moose in the road. The second place car, Porsche 997 GT3 RS was able to manage 82 km/h (51 mph).

Citroën produced 1,216,734 Xantias during its nine years of production at the PSA Rennes Plant. The Xantia was replaced with the Citroën C5 in 2001, although in its native France stock models continued to be offered as a cheaper alternative until October 2002.

Production of the Xantia at SAIPA, Tehran Iran from 2001 to 2010 resulted in an undisclosed number of additional units.

== Name ==
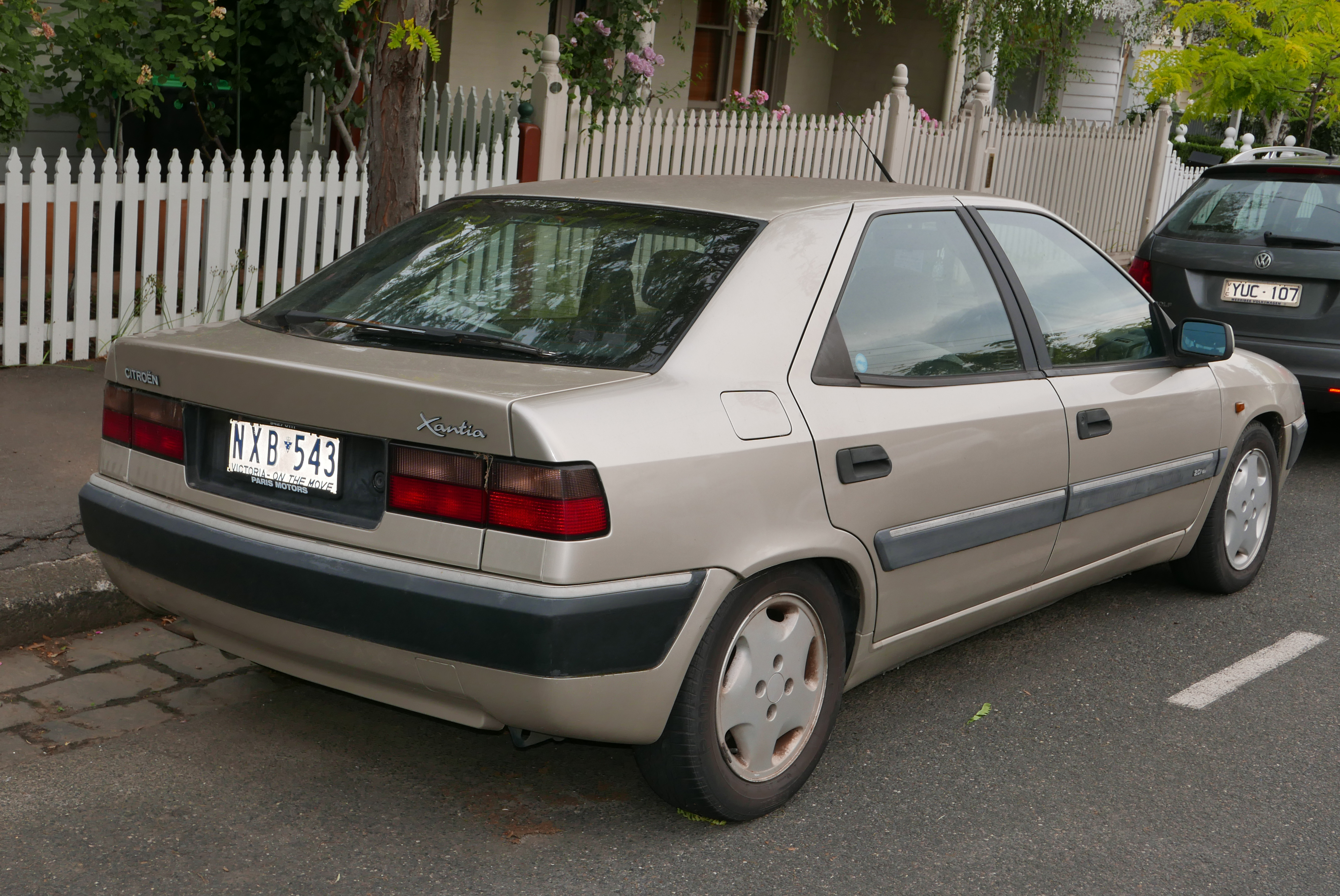
Citroën Xantia hatchback (pre-facelift)

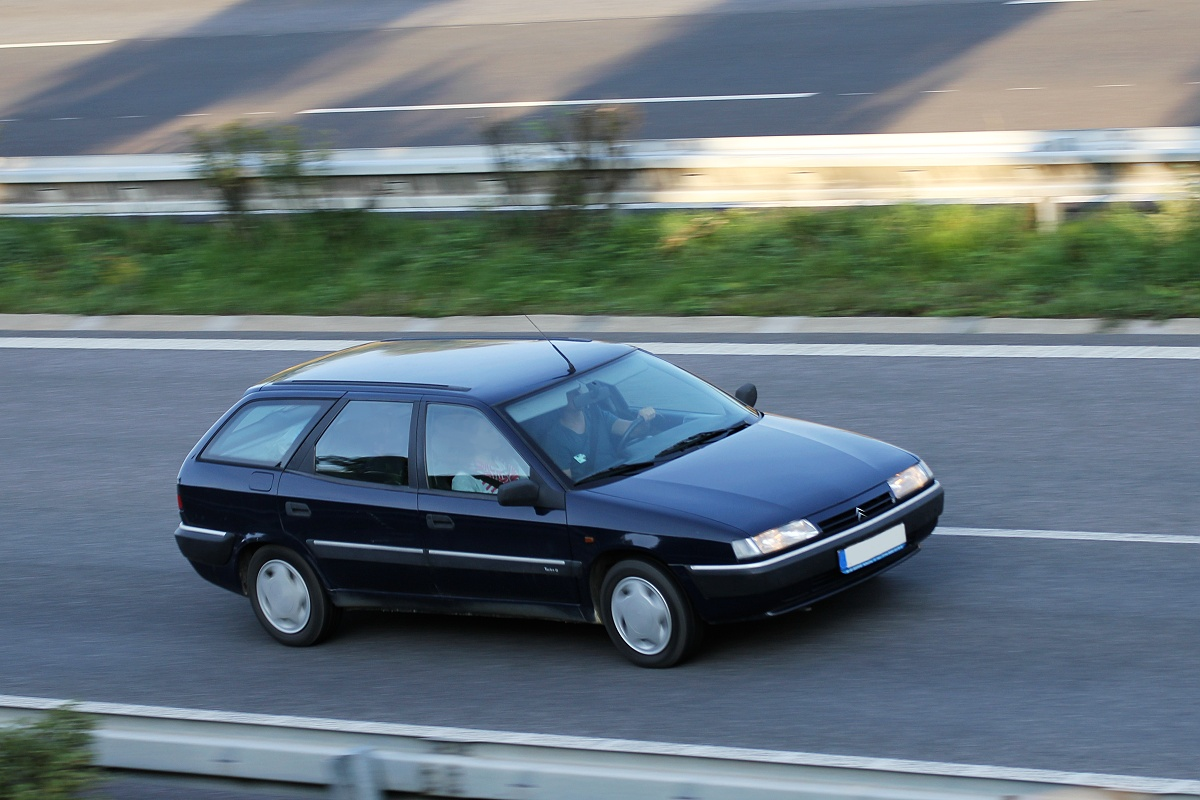
Citroën Xantia estate (pre-facelift)

The name "Xantia", like some other names used by Citroën before (like Athena or Pallas) comes from ancient Greek history and mythology.

"Xantia" is derived from Xanthos, mean golden or blond in Greek language. Xanthos is name of an ancient Lycian city (meaning "golden city") in ancient Lycia region. The name is also known for Xanthian Obelisk, An bilingual Obelisk from Persian Achaemenid Empire era found in ruins of Xanthos city.

The letter X was used in many Citroën models of this era. Citroën worked closely with Michelin, who were promoting their 'X' brand of tyres.

== History ==
The Xantia replaced the earlier Citroën BX (which straddled both small and large family car segments), and maintained the high level of popularity of that model, but brought the car more into the mainstream to compete harder with its mid-size rivals, such as the Ford Mondeo and Opel Vectra/Vauxhall Cavalier.

The Citroën Xantia was unveiled for the first time on 16 December 1992. The event took place at the CNIT in La Défense, near Paris, in the presence of 350 journalists from around the world and Jacques Calvet.

The car was built from November 1992 to October 2002 in France, totalling almost ten years, including the facelift in December 1997.

It signalled that Citroën had learned from the reception given to the staid Citroën ZX, introduced two years earlier, and criticised by contemporary journalists for its lack of traditional Citroën flair, in engineering and design. Citroën addressed these concerns in the Xantia.

The Xantia also used the traditional Citroën hydropneumatic suspension system, which was pioneered by the older DS. It was initially only available as a hatchback (notchback) (Berline), but an estate (station wagon) (Break) version, built by Heuliez, appeared in September 1995.

Inline with PSA Group policy, the Peugeot 406, launched two years later, used the same floorpan, core structure and engines as the Xantia. The Hydractive suspension system was not carried over, and the 406 utilised a more traditional spring suspension.

Sales in the United Kingdom were strong, and even though it was never able to match the volume of British favourites, such as the Ford Mondeo or Vauxhall Vectra, the car did help Citroën establish a strong foothold in the business car market in the United Kingdom.

== 1998 facelift ==
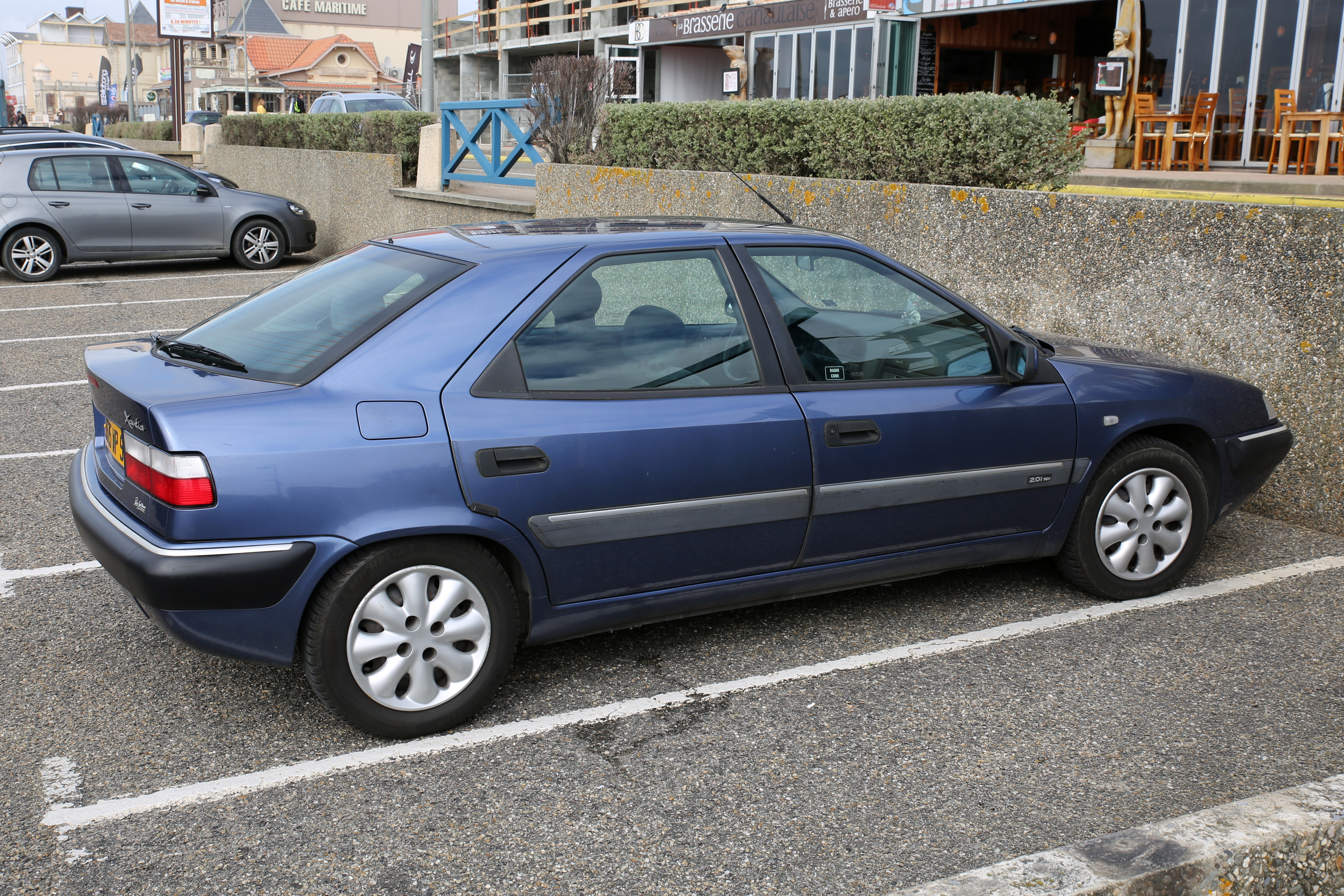
Citroën Xantia hatchback (facelift)

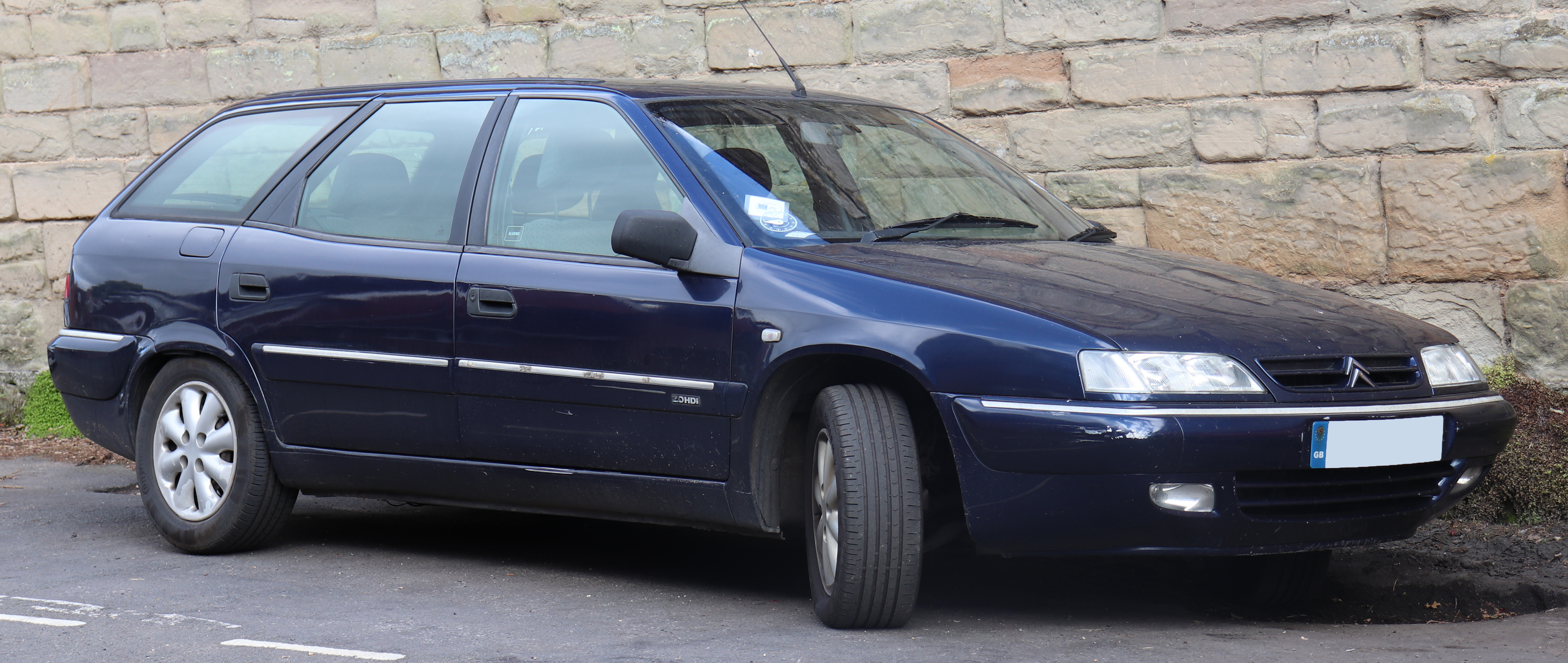
Citroën Xantia estate (facelift)

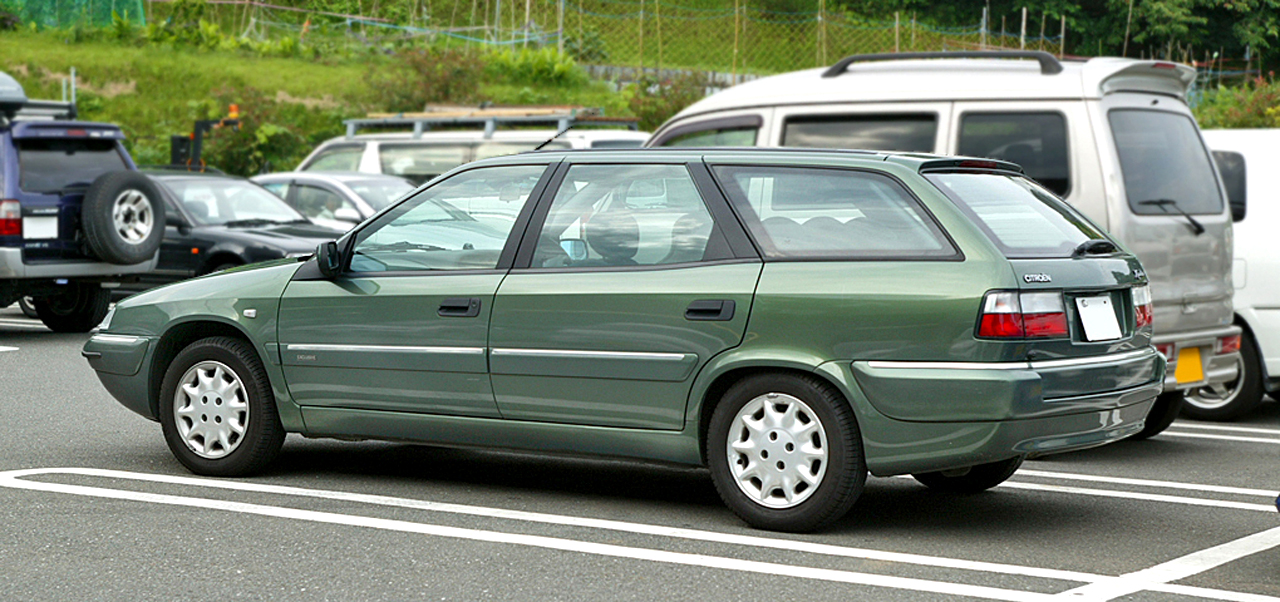
Citroën Xantia estate (facelift)

The Xantia was given a facelift at the end of 1997. The Mark 1, produced between 1993 and 1997, can be distinguished by the grille integrated with the body of the car. On the Mark 2, produced between 1998 and 2001, the grille is attached to the bonnet. The facelift model also features body colored bumpers and a revised dashboard.

== Xantia Activa ==
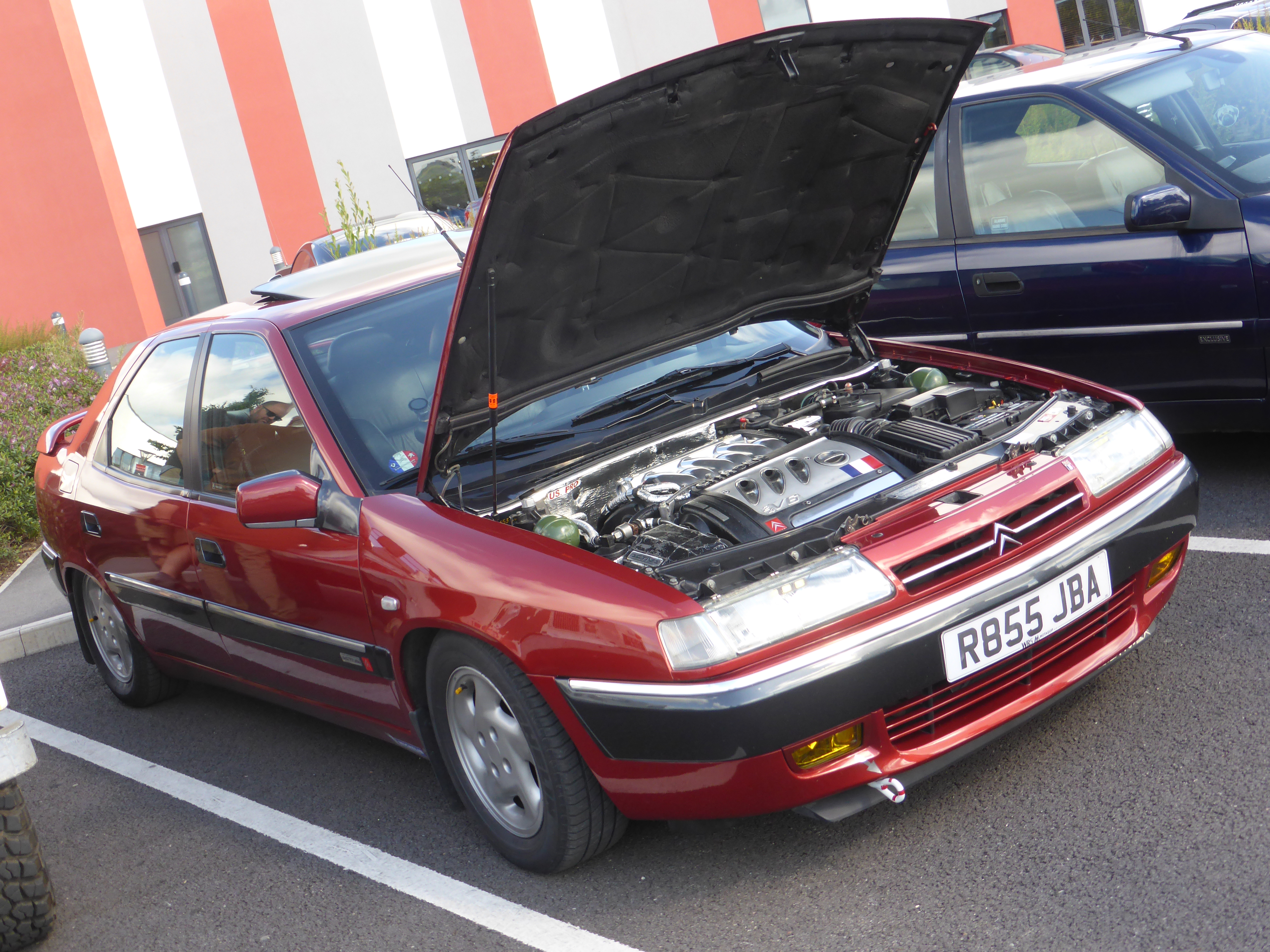
Citroen Xantia Activa V6 (1997)

The top model in Citroën's Xantia series was the highly engineered Activa. The model was introduced at the end of 1994, and between the spring of 1995 and the autumn of 2001 was built in just over 18,000 examples.

The name refers to the Citroën Activa showcar. The distinguishing feature of the Activa was the ability to drive around curves without any chassis roll. This technology is more broadly known as active suspension.

This lack of roll is achieved by active chassis intervention. In addition to Hydractive II, Activa also had undercarriage stabilization (AFS) (in French SC.CAR = Système Citroën de Contrôle Actif du Roulis), which was the first standard-fitted, active cross-stabilizer in automobile construction. With this system, the lateral inclination could be reduced to a minimum (−0.2 ° to 1 °) by means of mechanical control with hydraulic cylinders acting on the cross-stabilizer bars. This technique enabled (according to the manufacturer's specifications) with optimal road grip transverse accelerations of up to 1.2 g and despite this also offered an above-average high suspension comfort and thus a safer road position. Compared to the standard models, Activa had seats with reinforced side rails, which on the first series (X1) were also pneumatically adjustable.

=== Activa active anti-roll bars ===
In 1994, the Activa technology was introduced, which is an extension to the Hydractive II suspension, where two additional spheres and two hydraulic cylinders are used together with computer control to eliminate body roll completely.

=== Moose test ===
The Citroën Xantia V6 Activa formerly held the record speed (85 km/h (53 mph)) through the moose test maneuver, due to its active anti-roll bars, before being dethroned after 26 years by the Porsche Cayman GT4 RS Manthey. This test is conducted by the magazine Teknikens Värld's, as a test of avoiding a moose in the road. The second place car, a Nissan Qashqai DIG-T 160 Acenta was able to manage 84 km/h (52 mph).

A TikTok video compared a 1996 Citroën Xantia to a 2021 BMW M4 Competition in the moose test: The Xantia was able to pass the obstacles at 73 km/h (45 mph) without flipping a single traffic cone, whereas the M4 had to slow down to 29 km/h (18 mph), while still knocking down three cones in the process.

=== Detailed description for AFS / SC.CAR ===
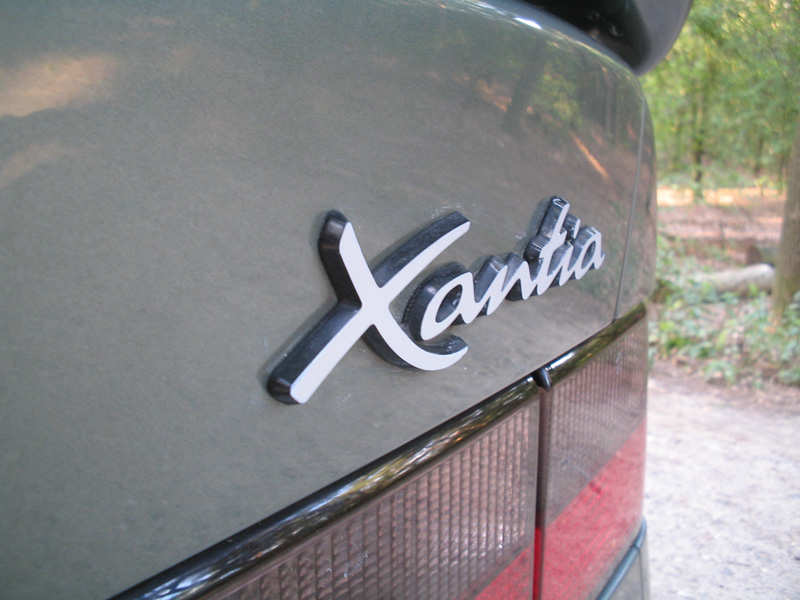
Xantia badge

Both (relatively thick) transverse stabilizers (front 28 mm, rear 25 mm dimensions) were located diagonally (front left and rear right), and were connected to the wheel joints by a differential hydraulic cylinder.

These cylinders were connected to a control valve, which was operated directly by the front cross joints with connecting rods over a spring-handle mechanism. The occurring rolling moment (side slope) had the opposite effect on the cross joints - one wheel springs in and the other out. Thereby, the control valve (inclination corrector) was pulled out / pushed in by means of the connecting rods in a direction out of its rest position (straight ahead), whereby a pressure proportional to the rolling moment was formed in the hydraulic cylinders.

Thereby the hydraulic cylinders changed position and acted against the bias of the cross stabilizer. They "pressed" the body over the cross-stabilizer bars against the rolling torque further horizontally, enabling cornering with up to 0.6g transverse acceleration with −0.2 to 0.5° lateral inclination. From 0.6g transverse acceleration, the cylinders returned to the starting position, from which the Xantia Activa tilted up to 1° in the curve until the curve limit area was reached, which corresponded to the value of a sports car with a correspondingly tighter tuning.

As these active roller stabilizers worked independently of the Hydractive II undercarriage, the suspension could be almost completely maintained even at extreme cornering, giving a significantly better road position in these situations than with conventional wheel suspensions. When driving straight ahead, a solenoid valve was operated by the control unit for the Hydractive suspension, which connected an additional spring ball in the hydraulic control circuit of the cylinder. Thereby, the stiffness of the tightly tuned stabilizer bars could be minimized "virtually" by gas filling the spring ball to reduce the movements and increase the comfort. Likewise, they had a damping effect on the control circuit, so that there were no undesired oscillations during straight-ahead driving due to suspension-related, short-term operation of the inclination corrector.

=== Activa engines ===
The Xantia Activa was available with the following engines (not all engines were necessarily available in all countries):

Petrol: 2.0i 16V 97 kW (132 hp), 2.0i 16V 110 kW (150 hp), 2.0i Turbo CT 108 kW (147 hp) and 3.0i V6 140 kW (190 hp). Diesel: 2.1 Turbo D12 80 kW (109 hp) and 2.0 HDi 80 kW (109 hp).

The Activa could be recognized by the standard-fitted rear spoiler, the "Venise" alloy wheels, the car-painted bumpers (on the first series), the black roof canopy (depending on the year of construction), special front seats with distinctive side members and the Activa logo instead of engine displacement badge.

== Hydraulic suspension ==
The Xantia was the last Citroën to use the green fluid, LHM (Liquide Hydraulique Minéral), a mineral oil. Later cars, such as the C5, used LDS instead.

The Xantia also was the last Citroën vehicle to use a common hydraulic circuit for suspension, brakes and steering like the pioneering Citroën DS.

The Xantia had several variants of the Hydraulic system:

- Hydropneumatic suspension (5 spheres)
- Hydractive 2 suspension (7 spheres)
- Hydropneumatic (anti-sink) suspension (6 spheres)
- Hydractive 2 (anti-sink) suspension (8 spheres)
- Activa active suspension SC.CAR (10 spheres)

=== Hydractive ===
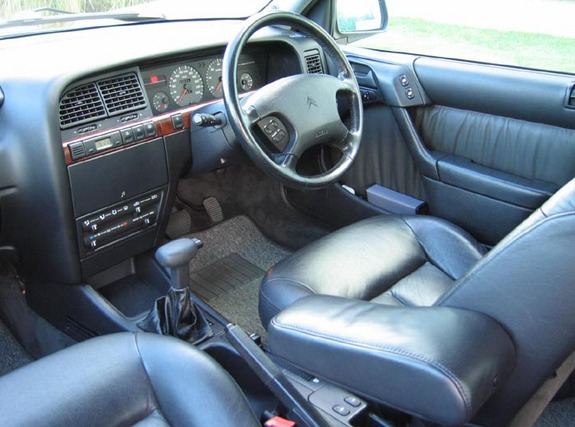
Xantia interior

From an engineering perspective, the Xantia's biggest advance was the suspension. From launch, the more expensive models were available with an enhanced version of the XM's Hydractive, Hydractive II or H2, computer controlled version of the hydropneumatic self-leveling suspension.

This used extra suspension spheres to allow a soft ride in normal conditions, but taut body control during hard braking, acceleration or cornering.

These models feature an innovation first seen on the ZX, and then subsequently fitted to the facelifted XM, a programmed self steer rear axle. On sweeping curves and tight bends alike, the rear wheels turn in line with the front wheels, sharpening responses and adding to driver pleasure.

== Engines ==
Power came from the familiar PSA XU series petrol engines, this time in 1.6, 1.8 and 2.0 displacements, a 2.0 16 valve version for the Xantia VSX, a turbocharged 2.0 engine, from 1995 onwards, a 1.8 16 valve and a 2.0 16 valve engine. In 1997, a 3.0 V6 engine was offered as top-of-the-line. This engine was also offered with the Activa suspension system, a rare version with fewer than 2600 built.

The popular XUD turbodiesel units in 1.9 (turbocharged: 92 hp (69 kW), low pressure turbo: 75 hp (56 kW), or not: 71 hp) displacement proved to be the best selling engine.

The biggest diesel was a 2.1 TD with 109 hp (81 kW). In 1998, PSA introduced the HDi direct injection turbodiesel (in two versions: 90 PS (66 kW), and intercooled 109 PS). For an economical diesel engine, the HDi offered the kind of throttle response normally seen in a gasoline engine and quiet high speed cruising at a top speed of 118 mph (190 km/h).

United Kingdom models of the Activa came fitted with a XU10 2 litre turbocharged engine also fitted to the Citroën XM 2.0CT and Peugeot 605 SRi. It produced 150 bhp and 171 lb ft of torque and was a 'low-blow' type for smooth power delivery rather than outright bhp.

| Model | Years | Type | Engine code | Displ. | Power | Torque |
Petrol engines
| 1.6 i | 1993–1995 | I4 8V | XU5 M3/Z (BFZ) | 1580 cc | 65 kW (88 PS; 87 hp) at 6000 rpm | 130 N⋅m (96 lb⋅ft) at 2600 rpm |
| 1.8 i | 1993–1998 | I4 8V | XU7 JP (LFZ) | 1762 cc | 74 kW (101 PS; 99 hp) at 6000 rpm | 153 N⋅m (113 lb⋅ft) at 3000 rpm |
| 1.8 i | 1995–2000 | I4 8V | XU7 JB (LFX) | 1762 cc | 66 kW (90 PS; 89 hp) at 5000 rpm | 147 N⋅m (108 lb⋅ft) at 2600 rpm |
| 1.8 i 16V | 1995–2001 | I4 16V | XU7 JP4 (LFY) | 1762 cc | 81 kW (110 PS; 109 hp) at 5500 rpm | 155 N⋅m (114 lb⋅ft) at 4250 rpm |
| 2.0 i | 1993–1998 | I4 8V | XU10 J2C (RFX) | 1998 cc | 89 kW (121 PS; 119 hp) at 5750 rpm | 176 N⋅m (130 lb⋅ft) at 2750 rpm |
| 2.0 i 16V | 1993–1994 | I4 16V | XU10 J4D/Z (RFY) | 1998 cc | 112 kW (152 PS; 150 hp) at 6500 rpm | 183 N⋅m (135 lb⋅ft) at 3500 rpm |
| 2.0 i 16V | 1994–1995 | I4 16V | XU10 J4D/Z (RFT) | 1998 cc | 110 kW (150 PS; 148 hp) at 6500 rpm | 183 N⋅m (135 lb⋅ft) at 3500 rpm |
| 2.0 i 16V | 1995–2001 | I4 16V | XU10 J4R (RFV) | 1998 cc | 97 kW (132 PS; 130 hp) at 5500 rpm | 180 N⋅m (130 lb⋅ft) at 4200 rpm |
| 2.0 i Turbo CT | 1995–2000 | I4 8V | XU10 J2TE (RGX) | 1998 cc | 108 kW (147 PS; 145 hp) at 5300 rpm | 235 N⋅m (173 lb⋅ft) at 2500 rpm |
| 3.0 i V6 | 1997–2000 | V6 24V | ES9 (XFZ) | 2946 cc | 150 kW (204 PS; 201 hp) at 5500 rpm | 267 N⋅m (197 lb⋅ft) at 4000 rpm |
Diesel engines
| 1.9 D | 1993–1995 | I4 8V | XUD9 A (D9B) | 1905 cc | 51 kW (69 PS; 68 hp) at 4600 rpm | 120 N⋅m (89 lb⋅ft) at 2000 rpm |
| 1.9 D | 1995–1996 | I4 8V | XUD9 Y (DJZ) | 1905 cc | 50 kW (68 PS; 67 hp) at 4600 rpm | 120 N⋅m (89 lb⋅ft) at 2000 rpm |
| 1.9 SD | 1996–2000 | I4 8V | XUD9 SD (DHW) | 1905 cc | 55 kW (75 PS; 74 hp) at 4600 rpm | 135 N⋅m (100 lb⋅ft) at 2250 rpm |
| 1.9 Turbo D | 1993–1996 | I4 8V | XUD9 TE/L (D8B) | 1905 cc | 68 kW (92 PS; 91 hp) at 4000 rpm | 196 N⋅m (145 lb⋅ft) at 2250 rpm |
| 1.9 Turbo D | 1996–2000 | I4 8V | XUD9 TE/Y (DHX) | 1905 cc | 66 kW (90 PS; 89 hp) at 4000 rpm | 196 N⋅m (145 lb⋅ft) at 2250 rpm |
| 2.0 HDi | 1998–2001 | I4 8V | DW10 TD (RHY) | 1997 cc | 66 kW (90 PS; 89 hp) at 4000 rpm | 205 N⋅m (151 lb⋅ft) at 1900 rpm |
| 2.0 HDi | 1998–2001 | I4 8V | DW10 ATED (RHZ) | 1997 cc | 80 kW (109 PS; 107 hp) at 4000 rpm | 250 N⋅m (180 lb⋅ft) at 1750 rpm |
| 2.1 Turbo D12 | 1995–1999 | I4 12V | XUD11 BTE (P8C) | 2088 cc | 80 kW (109 PS; 107 hp) at 4300 rpm | 235 N⋅m (173 lb⋅ft) at 2000 rpm |

== Iranian production ==
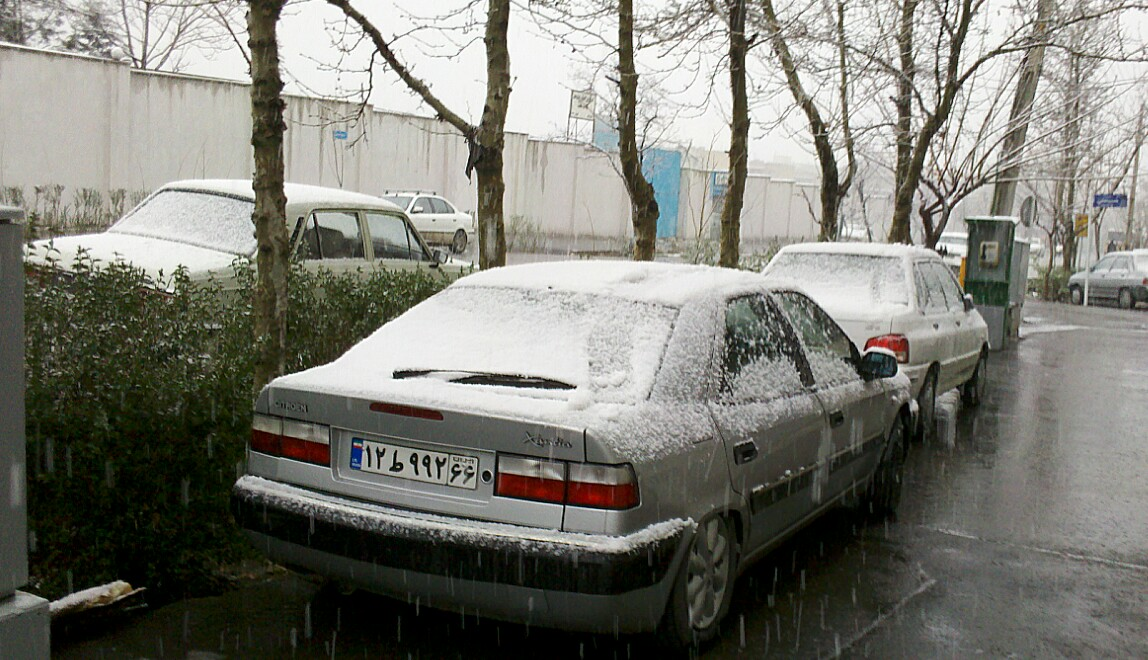
Citroën Xantia in Tehran

The Citroën Xantia was produced in Iran from 2001 to 2010 in four different Variants. All models produced in Iran were produced only with a five-speed manual gearbox and a five-door liftback body. The Xantia was the first Citroën produced by SAIPA ever since the Citroën Dyane Jian (1967-1980).

The February 18, 2000 contract, that renewed the relationship, called for SAIPA to serve as a center for exporting Xantia to the Middle East, Central Asia, Russia and Ukraine. In 2001, 9,500 out of a total 12,000 cars to be made in Iran, were expected to be sent abroad for being sold. At least 40% of parts would be made in Iran.

According to SAIPA, The Xantia was one of the best products produced in the history of car manufacturing in Iran. Production of the Xantia ended in 2010 due to the lack of spare parts from France and Citroën.

Full production figures of the Xantia in Iran are unknown.

=== Sales ===
Sales in Iran and production by SAIPA.

| Year | Sales in Iran | Production |
|---|---|---|
| 2001 | 3,370 | unknown |
| 2002 | 3,692 | unknown |
| 2003 | 4,695 | 3,800 |
| 2004 | 11,947 | 11,900 |
| 2005 | 13,669 | 14,200 |
| 2006 | 12,995 | 11,300 |
| 2007 | unknown | 10,400 |
| 2008 | unknown | 12,500 |
| 2009 | unknown | 11,800 |
| 2010 | 7,594 | 4,000 |

=== Iranian models ===
Xantia 1800 Superlux: This model is based on the French model 1.8i 16V SX with the removal of some equipment such as the sunroof, rear wing, body-colored flaps, aluminum wheels, cruise control and removal of a number of electronic car alarm sensors and a different car audio system.

Xantia 2000 X: This model is based on the French 2.0i 16V SX model with the removal of some equipment such as front passenger airbags and side airbags, ABS anti-lock brakes, sunroof, rear wing, body-colored flaps, front fenders, cruise control and the removal of a number of sensors. The Electronic car alarm and car sound system were changed.

Xantia 2000 SX: This model is based on the French 2.0i16V SX model with the removal of some equipment such as side airbags, sunroof, rear wing, body-colored flaps, cruise control and the removal of a number of electronic car alarm sensors, it also had a different car audio system.

Xantia Facelift or Xantia 2: Essentially a 2000 SX with no real changes other than a redesign of the front and rear bumpers.

== Chinese production ==
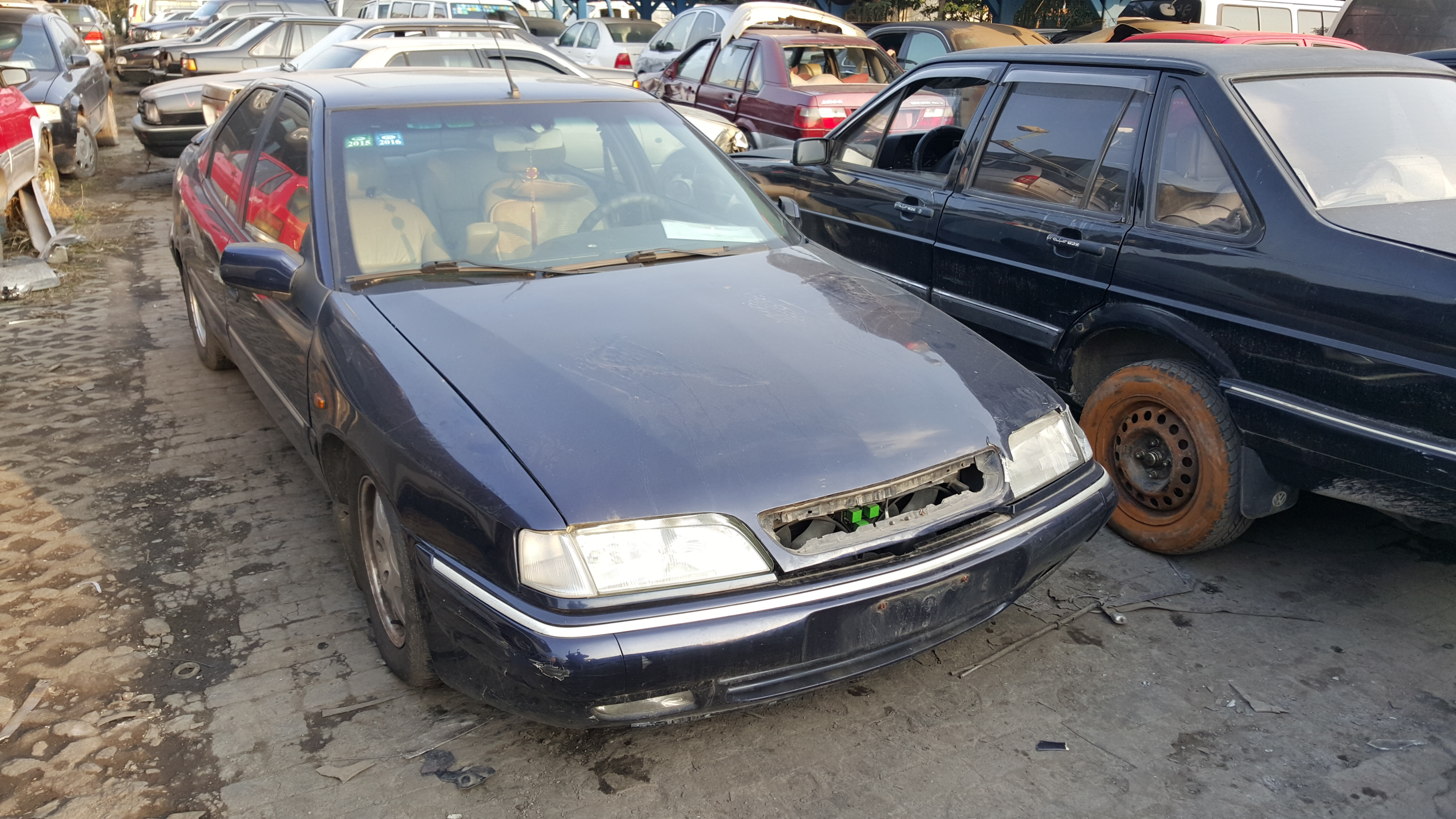
Front view of a Chinese made Citroën XM (Xantia).

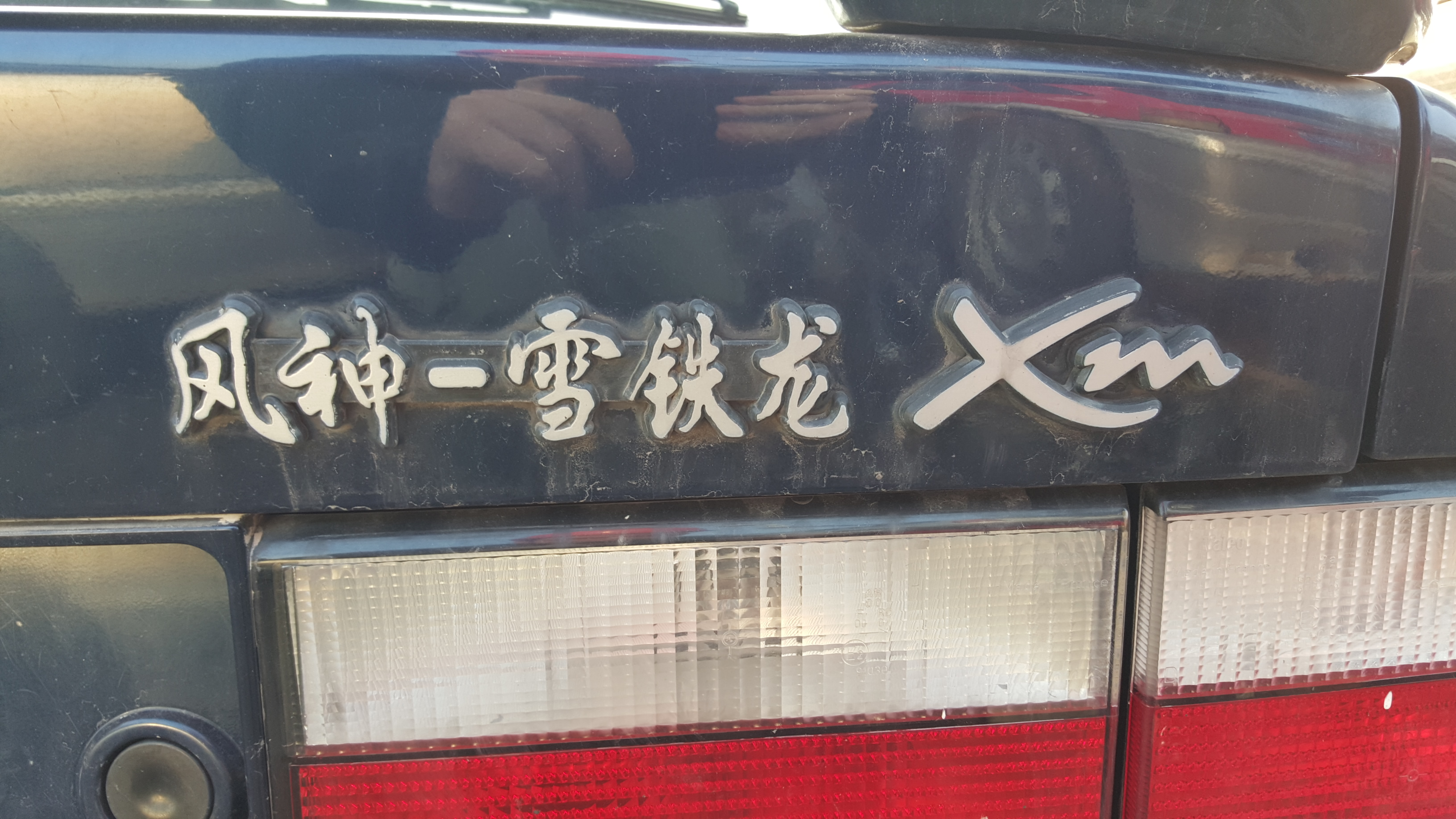
Fengshen Citroën Badge

The Citroën Xantia, along with the Citroën XM were assembled in form of Citroën-shipped CKD knockdown kits in Huizhou, Guangdong province. This venture lasted for only two years from 1996 to 1997, and production numbers were extremely low. The cars were imported to China more or less fully assembled with only minor additions done in China as a way to avoid the high import tariffs on cars that existed at the time. Both cars were badged as XM.

The vehicles full name was Fengshen Xietuolong XM.
