= Moose test =

Evasive maneuver vehicle test

The evasive manoeuvre test (Swedish: Undanmanöverprov, German: Ausweichmanövertest; colloquial: moose test or elk test; Swedish: Älgtest, German: Elchtest) is performed to determine how well a certain vehicle evades a suddenly appearing obstacle. This test has been standardized in ISO 3888-2.

Forms of the test have been performed in Sweden since the 1970s. The colloquial and internationally better-known name for the test was coined in 1997 by the German newspaper Süddeutsche Zeitung after the Swedish motor magazine Teknikens Värld together with the TV-show Trafikmagasinet flipped a First generation Mercedes-Benz A-Class in a test ostensibly made to measure the car's ability to avoid hitting a moose.

In reality, the test is constructed to simulate, for example, a reversing car or a child rushing out onto the road. This is because it is more likely that the moose will continue across the road than remain in place or turn back, making it more advisable to brake hard and try to slip behind the animal than to swerve in front of it.

== Test specifications ==
The test is performed on a dry road surface. Traffic cones are set up in an S shape to simulate the obstacle, road, and road edges. The car to be tested has one belted person in each available seat and weights in the boot to achieve maximum load. In order to qualify as a "pass" the vehicle must successfully navigate the course at 72 km/h (45 mph).

After coming onto the track, the driver quickly swerves into the oncoming lane to avoid the object and then immediately swerves back to avoid potential oncoming traffic. The test is repeated at an increased speeds until the car skids, knocks down cones, or spins around.

== 1997 Mercedes A-Class test ==
On 21 October 1997 the journalist Robert Collin from Teknikens Värld overturned the new (now First generation) Mercedes-Benz A-Class in the moose test at 60 km/h (37 mph), while a Trabant—a much older, and widely mocked car from the former East Germany—managed it successfully.

During an interview in Süddeutsche Zeitung, Collin tried to explain this test by the example of an evasive manoeuvre for a moose on the road. It was soon called Elchtest (moose test).

Mercedes initially denied the problem, but then took the step of recalling all units sold to date (2,600), rebuilding 17,000 cars and suspending sales for three months until the problem was solved by adding electronic stability control and modifying the suspension. The company spent DM 2.5 billion in developing the car, with a further DM 300 million to fix it.

== Ongoing testing ==
Teknikens Värld tests "hundreds of cars every year". with the moose test. It publishes test results since 1983 on their website. The car with the slowest speed to successfully complete the manoeuvre is the Reliant Rialto at 42.5 km/h (26.4 mph).

Some current vehicles, such as the 2021–present Mitsubishi Outlander and Volvo XC40 Recharge T4, still fail this test. The Toyota RAV4 EV originally also failed, but after the latest software revision now passes.

== Current champion ==
In 2025, the IM Motors IM5 set a new benchmark in the moose test (ISO 3888-2 NV), achieving a recorded speed of 90.96 km/h. The previous record holder was the Citroën Xantia 3.0i V6 Activa at 85 km/h (52.8 mph), holding the record for 26 years.

== Actual moose collision testing ==
Although the moose test itself is based on the avoidance of hitting an obstruction in the road, testing is also carried out on actual collision with animals in the road. Both Volvo and Saab have a tradition of taking moose crashes into account when building cars. Saab assisted Magnus Gens in creating a crash test dummy moose to simulate moose–vehicle collisions.

The Swedish National Road and Transport Research Institute has developed a moose crash test dummy called "Mooses". The dummy (which is made with similar weight, centre of gravity and dimensions to a live moose) is used to simulate realistic moose collisions.

Australian car manufacturers use crash test kangaroo dummies for similar reasons.

In a 2008 episode of MythBusters, the urban legend that accelerating to hit a moose would cause less damage than braking was investigated and busted using a modified version of Gens's model. It was found that regardless of car type and speed, the damage to a vehicle was catastrophic in all cases.

== See also ==
- Tilt test (vehicle safety test)
