= VertiGo =

VertiGo is a remotely controlled wheeled robot that can climb walls by using two 360° tiltable propellers that produce thrust angled both upwards and against the wall surface. It can roll horizontally up to a vertical wall, and then transition to climbing by coordinated changes in the propeller direction and thrust and the wheel traction. The VertiGo project is a collaboration between researchers of ETH Zurich and Disney Research Zurich. The VertiGo's chassis is a central carbon fiber baseplate. It has 3-D printed joints and wheel suspension parts that vary the propeller thrust and vehicle weight distribution.
