= Citroën Activa =

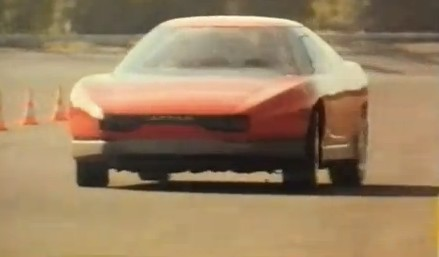
- Activa I (1988)

Overview
- Manufacturer: Citroën
- Production: 1988 / 1990
- Designer: Art Blakeslee (Head of Design); Dan Abramson (exterior, both Activa I & II)

Body and chassis
- Class: Concept car
- Body style: 2-door coupe

Dimensions
- Wheelbase: Activa 2: 2,850 mm (112.2 in)
- Length: Activa 2: 4,940 mm (194.5 in)
- Width: Activa 2: 1,840 mm (72.4 in)
- Height: Activa 2: 1,280 mm (50.4 in)

The Citroën Activa and Activa 2 were two concept cars produced by the French manufacturer Citroën as a means to test and to showcase features intended for future use in their production cars. Both were unveiled at the Paris Motor Show in 1988 and 1990 respectively.

The name Activa was later used to refer to the production Xantia fitted with Activa suspension.

== Overview ==
Among the features seen on the Activa models was the electronically controlled hydropneumatic suspension (known as the "Hydractive" system) combined with an active anti-roll bar. This married Citroën's famous hydropneumatic suspension system to sophisticated electronics, enabling the handling of the car to automatically adapt to how it was being driven as well as virtually eliminating body roll (one of the main criticisms of Citroën's hydropneumatic system was the amount of body roll). The Hydractive system was soon to become available to the public first in Citroën's XM model 1989, and Xantia model 1993. In 1995 Activa prototypes' active anti-roll-bar was introduced in the Xantia Activa, making it one of the few production cars to have active suspension.

== Activa 1 ==
The Activa 1 included full hydraulically connected, single wheel independent four-wheel steering, anti-lock brakes and traction control, which were high-tech for the time, while the Activa 2 was more conventional, except the anti-roll-system and featured a center console keypad instead of a gear lever and a navigation system. In addition, the Activa 1 featured electronically operated doors which could all be opened at once using a remote control. Mechanically, the Activa 1 was powered by a 3.0L SOHC PRV 24 valve V6 engine producing 200 PS (147 kW; 197 hp) at 6000 rpm and 260 N⋅m (192 lb⋅ft) of torque at 3600 rpm, coupled to a 4-speed automatic transmission. This gave the Activa 1 a claimed top speed of 136 mph (219 km/h).

== Activa 2 ==
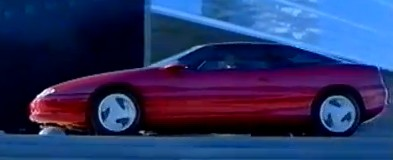
Activa 2 (1990)

The Activa 2 was considered for production as a successor to the SM, but it was eventually decided that Citroën's image would make it too hard to compete with prestigious marques such as Mercedes-Benz and Porsche in the grand touring market. The Activa 2 was a fully functional prototype, based on the XM's bottom plate and equipped with the same 24-valve, 3-liter V6 engine and four-speed automatic transmission which had also been used on the Activa 1. Claimed top speed increased to 235 km/h (146 mph). The prototype was mainly built by Bertone, who possessed the expertise to build running prototypes. The Activa 2 was test driven by journalists in period, as part of a push to build excitement about the Hydractive suspension.
