= Old car =

Old car may refer to:

- Antique car, a collectible car of age that has been preserved or restored
- Classic car, a car of age that has been preserved or restored, but is short of the age in which it is considered antique
- Decrepit car, an old car in poor condition
- Veteran car, pre-20th century car
- Vintage car, cars from model years 1919–1930
