= Weight distribution =

Spread of weight in a vehicle

Weight distribution is the apportioning of weight within a vehicle, especially cars, airplanes, and trains. Typically, it is written in the form x/y, where x is the percentage of weight in the front, and y is the percentage in the back.

In a vehicle which relies on gravity in some way, weight distribution directly affects a variety of vehicle characteristics, including handling, acceleration, traction, and component life. For this reason weight distribution varies with the vehicle's intended usage. For example, a drag car maximizes traction at the rear axle while countering the reactionary pitch-up torque. It generates this counter-torque by placing a small amount of counterweight at a great distance forward of the rear axle.

In the airline industry, load balancing is used to evenly distribute the weight of passengers, cargo, and fuel throughout an aircraft, so as to keep the aircraft's center of gravity close to its center of pressure to avoid losing pitch control. In military transport aircraft, it is common to have a loadmaster as a part of the crew; their responsibilities include calculating accurate load information for center of gravity calculations, and ensuring cargo is properly secured to prevent it shifting.

In large aircraft and ships, multiple fuel tanks and pumps are often used, so that as fuel is consumed, the remaining fuel can be positioned to keep the vehicle balanced, and to reduce stability problems associated with the free surface effect.

In the trucking industry, individual axle weight limits require balancing the cargo when the gross vehicle weight nears the legal limit.

== See also ==
- Center of mass
- Center of percussion
- Load transfer
- Mass distribution
- Roll center
- Tilt test
- Weight transfer
