= Tilt test (vehicle safety test) =

The tilt test is a safety test that certain government vehicle certification bodies require new vehicle designs to pass before being allowed on the road, race, or rail track.

The test assesses the weight distribution and hence the position of the centre of gravity of the vehicle, and can be carried out in a laden or unladen state, i.e. with or without passengers or freight. The test can be applied to automobiles, trucks, buses, and rail vehicles.

The test involves tilting the vehicle in the notional direction of its side on a movable platform. To pass the test, the vehicle must not tip over before the table reaches the specified tilt angle.

== United States ==
In the United States, an automotive tilt table testing center in Nevada designed and built an in-house tilt table to test vehicle capabilities in accordance with regulatory and industry standards. The table tilts at approximately 0.09 degrees per second and determines the static roll properties of vehicles. It has a surface area of 800 sq. ft. and a lifting capacity of 350,000 lbs.

== United Kingdom ==
In the United Kingdom, double-decker buses must be capable of leaning fully laden at an angle of 28 degrees without tipping over.

== Hong Kong ==
The same 28-degree requirement applies in Hong Kong to double-decker buses. For single-deckers, the requirement is 35 degrees.

== See also ==
- Vehicle metrics
- Weight distribution
- Moose test
