= Johnson Electric =

Hong Kong automotive and industrial company

Johnson Electric Holdings Limited
- Industry: Automotive, Industrial
- Key people: Dr. Patrick Shui-Chung Wang (Chairman and CEO)
- Number of employees: 30,000
- Divisions: Automotive Products Group; Industry Products Group; Components & Services
- Website: www.johnsonelectric.com

Johnson Electric (德昌電機控股有限公司) (SEHK: 179) is a provider of motors, actuators, motion subsystems and related electro-mechanical components for automotive, industrial and medical applications. Johnson Electric has manufacturing facilities in 22 countries.

For the 12 months ending 31 March 2024, the company's net income was US$229 million on revenues of US$3.8 billion.

The company's motion systems, motors and switches businesses are managed through two operating divisions: the Automotive Products Group and the Industry Products Group. Supporting the two divisions is the Group's Component & Services (C&S) function which produces plastic and metal parts, tooling and production equipment for motor and motion-related products.

Johnson Electric has its head office in Shatin, Hong Kong, and is listed on the Hong Kong stock exchange. Johnson Electric has over 30,000 employees and subcontract workers in more than 22 countries, with the majority of the workforce engaged in production activities in China. Engineering centers are located in Canada, China, France, Germany, Hong Kong, Hungary, Italy, Israel, Switzerland, the UK and the USA.

== Company history ==
The company was founded in 1959.

In 2000 the Johnson Electric Chairman Patrick Wang was named the DHL International (HK)/South China Morning Post Businessman of the Year.

In 2004 the company acquired Nihon Mini Motor for camera and optical disc drive products. In 2005 the company acquired Parlex, a USA manufacturer of flexible printed circuits.

In 2012 the company divested Saia Burgess Controls Division.

In 2015 the company acquired Stackpole, a manufacturer of engine and transmission pumps and powder metal components. In 2016 the company acquired AML Systems, a supplier of active modules for vehicle headlamp systems.

In 2016 Johnson Electric was named as among the best companies to work for in Asia by HR Asia Magazine.

In October, 2022, Johnson Electric acquired the Zwickau-headquartered eBike drive system company, Pendix.

== Recent Events ==
- 2017: Agreed to increase its equity interest in Halla Stackpole Corp. from 30% to 80% for approx. US$84 million
- 2017: Opened new production plant in Arujá, Brazil
