= Body roll =

Axial rotation of a vehicle's body

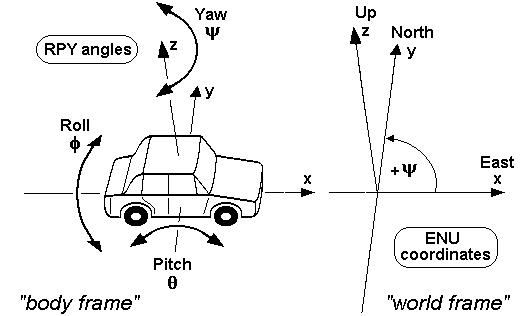
Body roll, represented by the character ɸ

Body roll is the axial rotation of a vehicle’s body towards the outside of a turn. Body roll occurs because the compliance in vehicle suspension allows the vehicle body, which sits upon the suspension, to lean in the direction of the perceived centrifugal force acting upon the vehicle.

== Cause ==
Vehicle suspension allows a vehicle’s wheels to move independently of its body. This smooths the ride for occupants and cargo while allowing the wheels to stay in contact with the ground over bumps. In a corner, the range of motion in the suspension allows the vehicle body to lean over toward the outside of the turn as the body tries to continue in a line tangential to the corner. Softer suspension with more travel will allow more body roll than harder suspension with less travel.

== Adverse effects ==
Body roll allows a vehicle’s centre of mass to move towards the outside of the turn, increasing the load transfer to the outside wheels. This can cause understeer or oversteer to occur more easily than if body roll was not a factor. Body roll can also be uncomfortable for passengers and cause damage to cargo.

== Mitigation ==
Anti-roll bars are suspension components designed to mitigate body roll. They do this by connecting the wheels at either end of an axle with a torsion bar attached to the vehicle body. Body roll can also be reduced by lowering centre of mass of the vehicle body, fitting stiffer suspension springs and reducing the sprung mass of the vehicle.

== See also ==
- Weight transfer
- Vehicle rollover
