= Teknikens Värld =

Swedish motor magazine

Teknikens värld (English: World of Technology) is a motor magazine published in Stockholm, Sweden.

== History and profile ==
Teknikens Värld was founded in 1948. The magazine is owned by Bonnier Group. Its publisher is Bonnier Tidskrifter AB, a subsidiary of the Group. The headquarters of the magazine is in Stockholm. Daniel Frodin is the editor-in-chief.

The magazine is known for their thorough automobile tests and gained worldwide attention in 1997 when the First generation Mercedes-Benz A-Class overturned in their moose test. It primarily features automotive news, reviews and test drives of passenger cars from various segments. Books are also published under the name, e.g. annual new and used cars guides.

In 2009 Teknikens värld had a circulation of 44,000 copies. The magazine had a circulation of 32,900 copies in 2014.
