= Mercedes-Benz A-Class =

Subcompact executive car

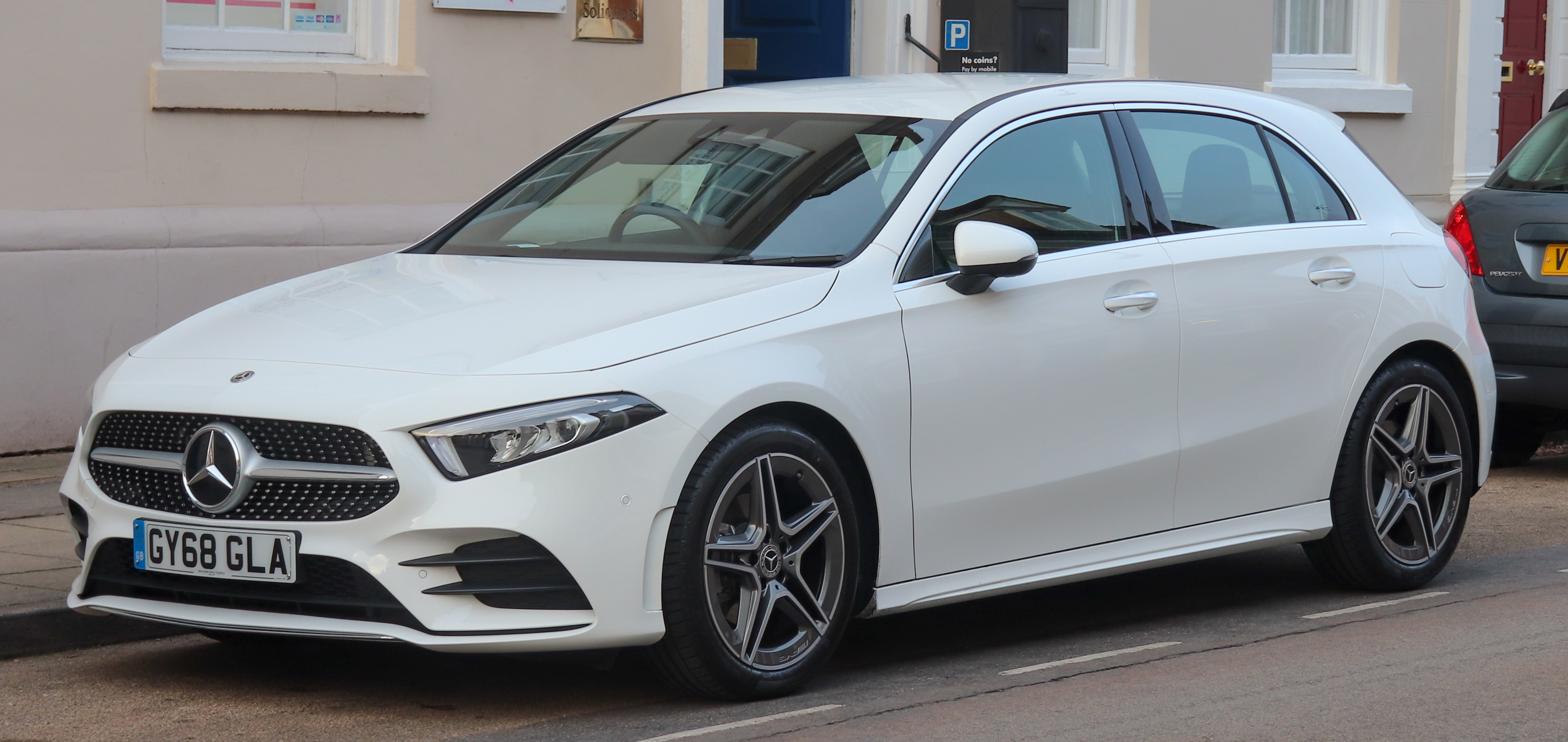
- Mercedes-Benz A-Class (W177)

Overview
- Manufacturer: Daimler-Benz (1996–1998); DaimlerChrysler (1998–2007); Daimler AG (2007–2022); Mercedes-Benz Group (2022–present)
- Production: 1996–present

Body and chassis
- Class: Supermini (B) (1997–2012); Subcompact executive car (C) (2012–present); Sport compact (AMG models)
- Body style: 3-door hatchback (2004–2012); 5-door hatchback; 4-door Sedan (2018–present)
- Layout: Front-engine, front-wheel-drive; Front-engine, all-wheel-drive (4MATIC, 2013–present)

The Mercedes-Benz A-Class is a car manufactured by German luxury automaker Mercedes-Benz. It has been marketed across four generations as a front-engine, front-wheel drive, five-passenger, five-door hatchback, with a three-door hatchback offered for the second generation, as well as a saloon version for the fourth.

As the brand's entry-level vehicle, the first generation A-Class, internally coded W168, was introduced in 1997, the second generation (W169) in late 2004 and the third generation (W176) in 2012. The fourth generation model (W177), which was launched in 2018, marked the first time the A-Class was offered in the United States and Canada. This fourth generation A-Class is also the first to be offered both as a hatchback (W177) and sedan (V177).

Styled by Steve Mattin and launched at the 1997 Frankfurt Motor Show, the A-Class was noted for its short, narrow footprint, its overall height, and an interior volume and level of equipment competing with larger cars. The A-Class subsequently gained length and width over its successive generations, losing some of its height. Approximately 3.3 million A-Class models had been manufactured by the 2021 model year.

== First generation (W168; 1996) ==
First generation
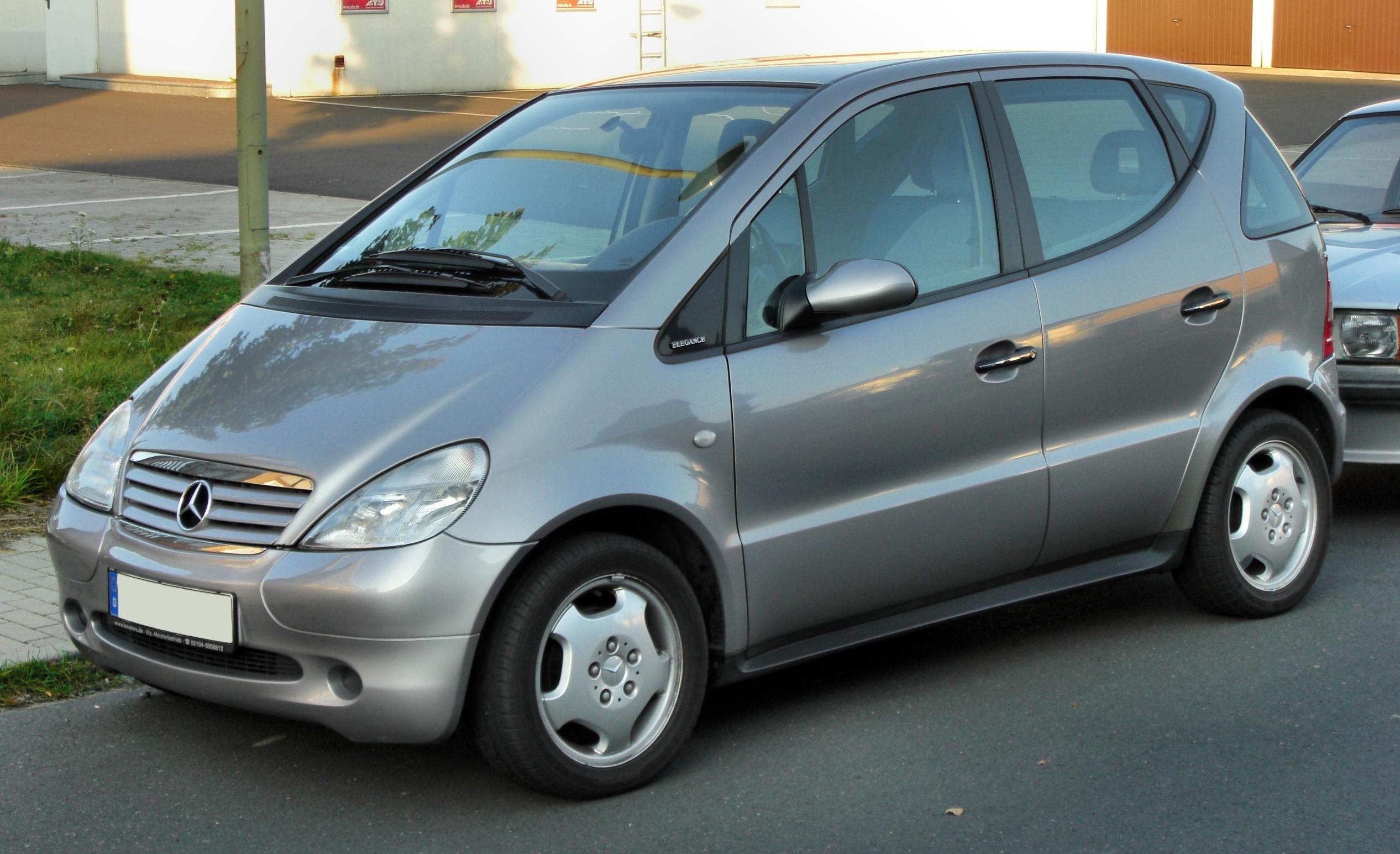

Overview
- Model code: W168
- Production: October 1996 – May 2004; February 1999 – September 2005 (Brazil)
- Assembly: Germany: Rastatt; Brazil: Juiz de Fora (Mercedes-Benz Brazil); Thailand: Samut Prakan (TAAP)
- Designer: Steve Mattin (1994)

Body and chassis
- Body style: 5-door hatchback
- Related: Mercedes-Benz Vaneo (W414)

Powertrain
- Engine: Petrol: 1.4 L M166 I4; 1.6 L M166 I4; 1.9 L M166 I4; 2.1 L M166 I4; Diesel: 1.7 L OM668 I4 CDI (turbo diesel)
- Transmission: 5-speed manual; 5-speed automated manual; 5-speed automatic

Dimensions
- Wheelbase: 2,423 mm (95.4 in); 2,593 mm (102.1 in) (LWB)
- Length: 3,606 mm (142.0 in); 3,780 mm (148.8 in) (LWB)
- Width: 1,719 mm (67.7 in)
- Height: 1,587 mm (62.5 in)

=== History ===
In 1994, Mercedes-Benz confirmed that it would be launching a compact car - the A-Class (A 160) - by early 1997, and (A 190) by early 1999, which would be the company's first venture in this sector of the market; it was hinted at this stage that the new car would be shorter than the average supermini but as spacious and practical inside as a large family car.

The A-Class was presented to the motoring press late in 1996, and launched at the Frankfurt Motor Show in the autumn of 1997, the W168 A-Class was quite unusual for Mercedes-Benz featuring a front-wheel drive layout and unusually tall but yet short body and Avantgarde at the 1999 Geneva Motor Show and 1999 Frankfurt Motor Show.

This was the first complete exterior designed by Coventry University trained Steve Mattin, for which he was named Autocar magazine's 'Designer of the Year'. Earlier, Mattin had mostly worked on design for the W210 E-Class in 1991. Concurrent to the W168, he designed the exterior of the W220 S-Class. The final design freeze occurred in January 1995, at 32 months before August 1997 start of production.

Between 1997 and 2004, 1.1 million first generation A-Class models had been sold. Overall, Daimler lost €1,440 per vehicle produced.

The A-Class was facelifted in February 2001, with minor alterations to the headlights, front and rear bumper design and the addition of a new 170 mm (6.7 in) longer wheelbase version. It was launched at the Geneva Motor Show.

=== Moose test issue and recall ===
The W168 became infamous in 1997 after flipping over during the traditional "moose test" performed by the Swedish automobile publication Teknikens Värld. According to the report, the W168 overturned when manoeuvring to avoid the "moose". Mercedes initially denied the problem, but then took the surprising step of recalling all units sold to date (2,600) and suspending sales for three months until the problem was solved by adding electronic stability control and modifying the suspension. The company spent DM 2.5 billion in developing the car, with a further DM 300 million to fix it.

=== Engines ===
All A-Class models are powered by four-cylinder engines, with 1.4 L and 1.6 L petrol models at launch (M 166 series), followed by two versions of a 1.7 L diesel engine (OM 668 series). In 1999, a larger 1.9 L petrol model was added, with the 2.1 the last W168 version to be launched in 2002. Also two AMG versions were produced, a 3.2 in 2001 and a 3.8 in 2000, though very few of these were made.

Model	Years	Configuration	Displacement	Power	Torque	0–100 km/h (0–62 mph)	Top Speed	Fuel Consumption/Efficiency (EU-Norm combined)
Petrol engines
A 140	1997–2004	M 166 E 14	1397 cm^{3}	60 kW (82 PS; 80 hp) at 5,000 rpm	130 N⋅m (96 lb⋅ft) at 3,750 rpm		170 km/h (106 mph)	6.8 L/100 km (35 mpg_{‑US})
A 140 L	2001–2004	M 166 E 14	1397 cm^{3}	60 kW (82 PS; 80 hp) at 5,000 rpm	130 N⋅m (96 lb⋅ft) at 3,750 rpm		170 km/h (106 mph)	6.8 L/100 km (35 mpg_{‑US})
A 140 Automatic	2000–2004	M 166 E 16 red.	1598 cm^{3}	60 kW (82 PS; 80 hp) at 5,000 rpm	140 N⋅m (103 lb⋅ft) at 2,500 rpm		166 km/h (103 mph)	6.8 L/100 km (35 mpg_{‑US})
A 140 L Automatic	2001–2004	M 166 E 16 red.	1598 cm^{3}	60 kW (82 PS; 80 hp) at 5,000 rpm	140 N⋅m (103 lb⋅ft) at 2,500 rpm		166 km/h (103 mph)	6.8 L/100 km (35 mpg_{‑US})
A 160	1997–2004	M 166 E 16	1598 cm^{3}	75 kW (102 PS; 101 hp) at 5,250 rpm	150 N⋅m (111 lb⋅ft) at 4,000 rpm		182 km/h (113 mph)	6.8 L/100 km (35 mpg_{‑US})
A 160 L	2001–2004	M 166 E 16	1598 cm^{3}	75 kW (102 PS; 101 hp) at 5,250 rpm	150 N⋅m (111 lb⋅ft) at 4,000 rpm		182 km/h (113 mph)	6.8 L/100 km (35 mpg_{‑US})
A 190	1999–2004	M 166 E 19	1898 cm^{3}	92 kW (125 PS; 123 hp) at 5,500 rpm	180 N⋅m (133 lb⋅ft) at 4,000 rpm		198 km/h (123 mph)	7.5 L/100 km (31 mpg_{‑US})
A 190 L	2001–2004	M 166 E 19	1898 cm^{3}	92 kW (125 PS; 123 hp) at 5,500 rpm	180 N⋅m (133 lb⋅ft) at 4,000 rpm		198 km/h (123 mph)	7.5 L/100 km (31 mpg_{‑US})
A 210 Evolution	2002 – 2004	M 166 E 21	2084 cm^{3}	103 kW (140 PS; 138 hp) at 5,500 rpm	205 N⋅m (151 lb⋅ft) at 4,000 rpm		203 km/h (126 mph)	7.9 L/100 km (30 mpg_{‑US})
A 210 Evolution L	2002 – 2004	M 166 E 21	2084 cm^{3}	103 kW (140 PS; 138 hp) at 5,500 rpm	205 N⋅m (151 lb⋅ft) at 4,000 rpm		203 km/h (126 mph)	7.9 L/100 km (30 mpg_{‑US})
A 32K AMG (Prototype)	2002	M 112 E 32 ML Supercharged	3199 cm^{3}	260 kW (354 PS; 349 hp) at 6,100 rpm	450 N⋅m (332 lb⋅ft) at 3,000–4,600 rpm		250 km/h (155 mph)	
A 38 AMG (Prototype)	1998	M 166 E 19 (two engines—front and rear)	3796 cm^{3} (2x 1898 cm^{3})	186 kW (253 PS; 249 hp) at 5,500 rpm	360 N⋅m (266 lb⋅ft) at 4,000 rpm		230 km/h (143 mph)	
Diesel engines
A 160 CDI	1998–2001	OM668 DE 17 A red.	1689 cm^{3}	44 kW (60 PS; 59 hp) at 3,600 rpm	160 N⋅m (118 lb⋅ft) at 1,500–2,400 rpm		158 km/h (98 mph)	4.5 L/100 km (52 mpg_{‑US})
A 160 CDI	2001–2004	OM 668 DE 17 LA red.	1689 cm^{3}	55 kW (75 PS; 74 hp) at 3,600 rpm	160 N⋅m (118 lb⋅ft) at 1,500–2,800 rpm		163 km/h (101 mph)	4.5 L/100 km (52 mpg_{‑US})
A 170 CDI	1998–2001	OM 668 DE 17 LA	1689 cm^{3}	66 kW (90 PS; 89 hp) at 4,200 rpm	180 N⋅m (133 lb⋅ft) at 1,600–3,200 rpm		175 km/h (109 mph)	4.9 L/100 km (48 mpg_{‑US})
A 170 CDI	2001–2004	OM 668 DE 17 LA	1689 cm^{3}	70 kW (95 PS; 94 hp) at 4,200 rpm	180 N⋅m (133 lb⋅ft) at 1,600–3,600 rpm		182 km/h (113 mph)	4.9 L/100 km (48 mpg_{‑US})
A 170 CDI L	2001–2004	OM 668 DE 17 LA	1689 cm^{3}	70 kW (95 PS; 94 hp) at 4,200 rpm	180 N⋅m (133 lb⋅ft) at 1,600–3,600 rpm		180 km/h (112 mph)	4.9 L/100 km (48 mpg_{‑US})

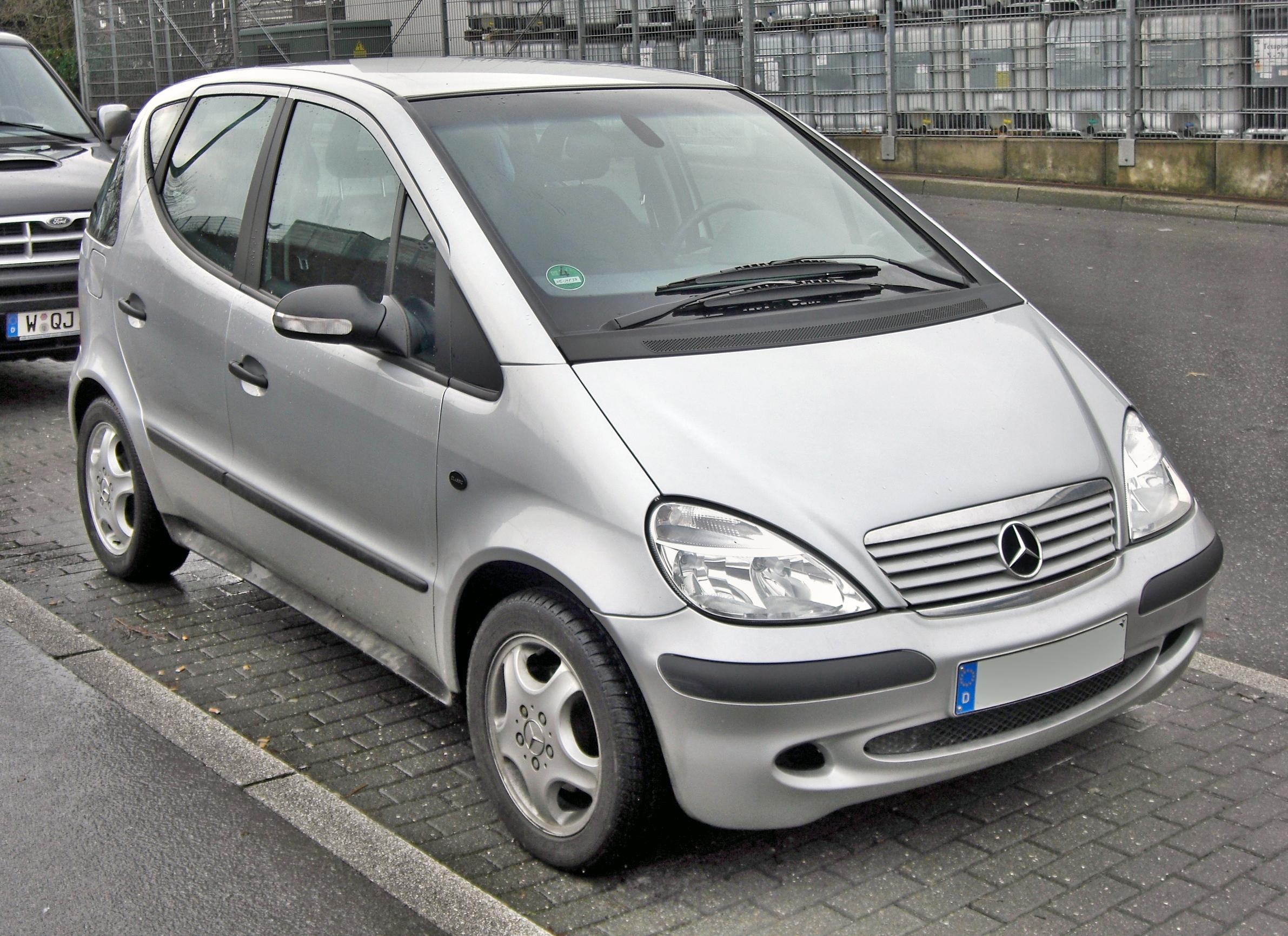
2001–2004 Facelift A 140 Classic

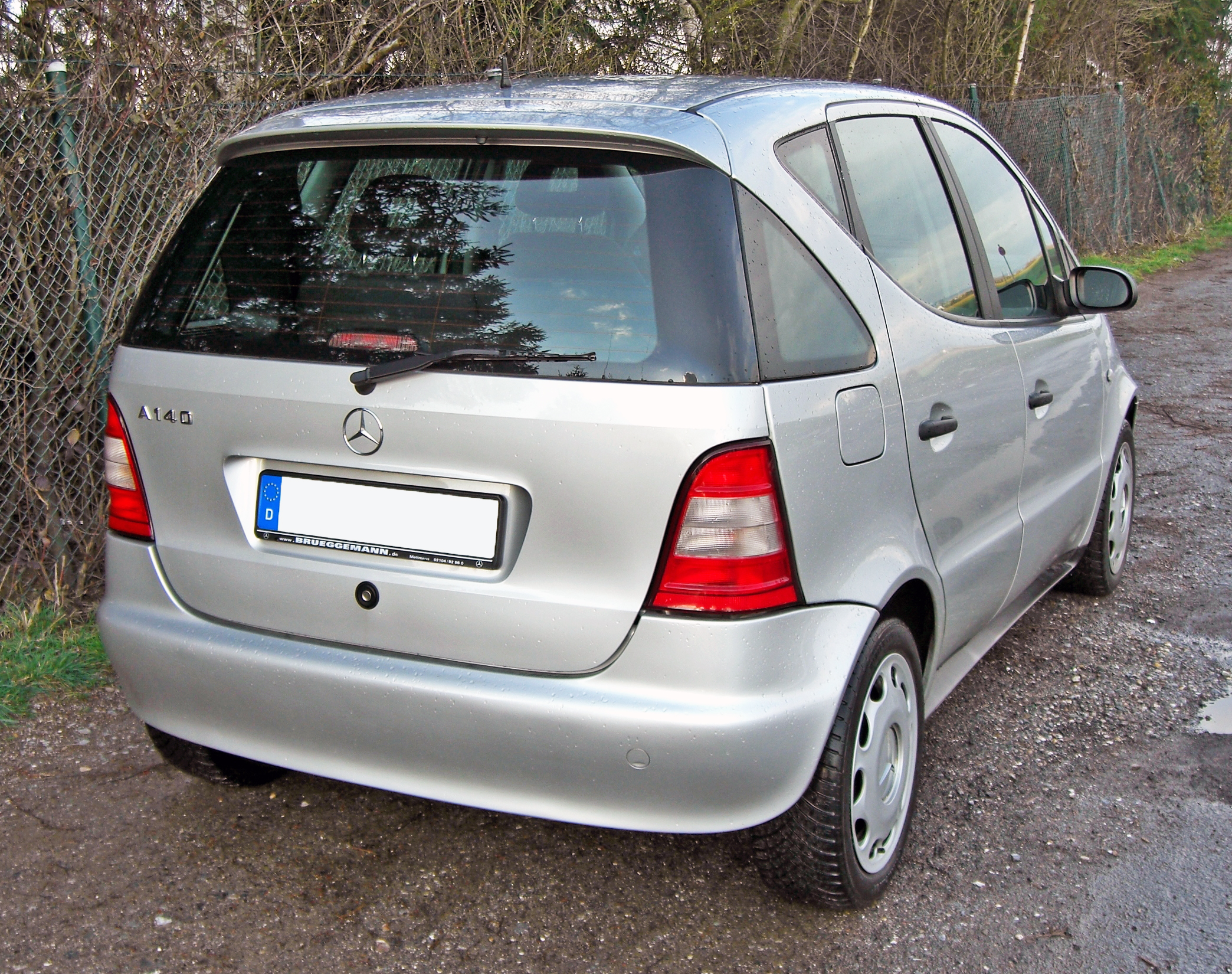
1997–2001 Pre-facelift A 140 Classic Fun

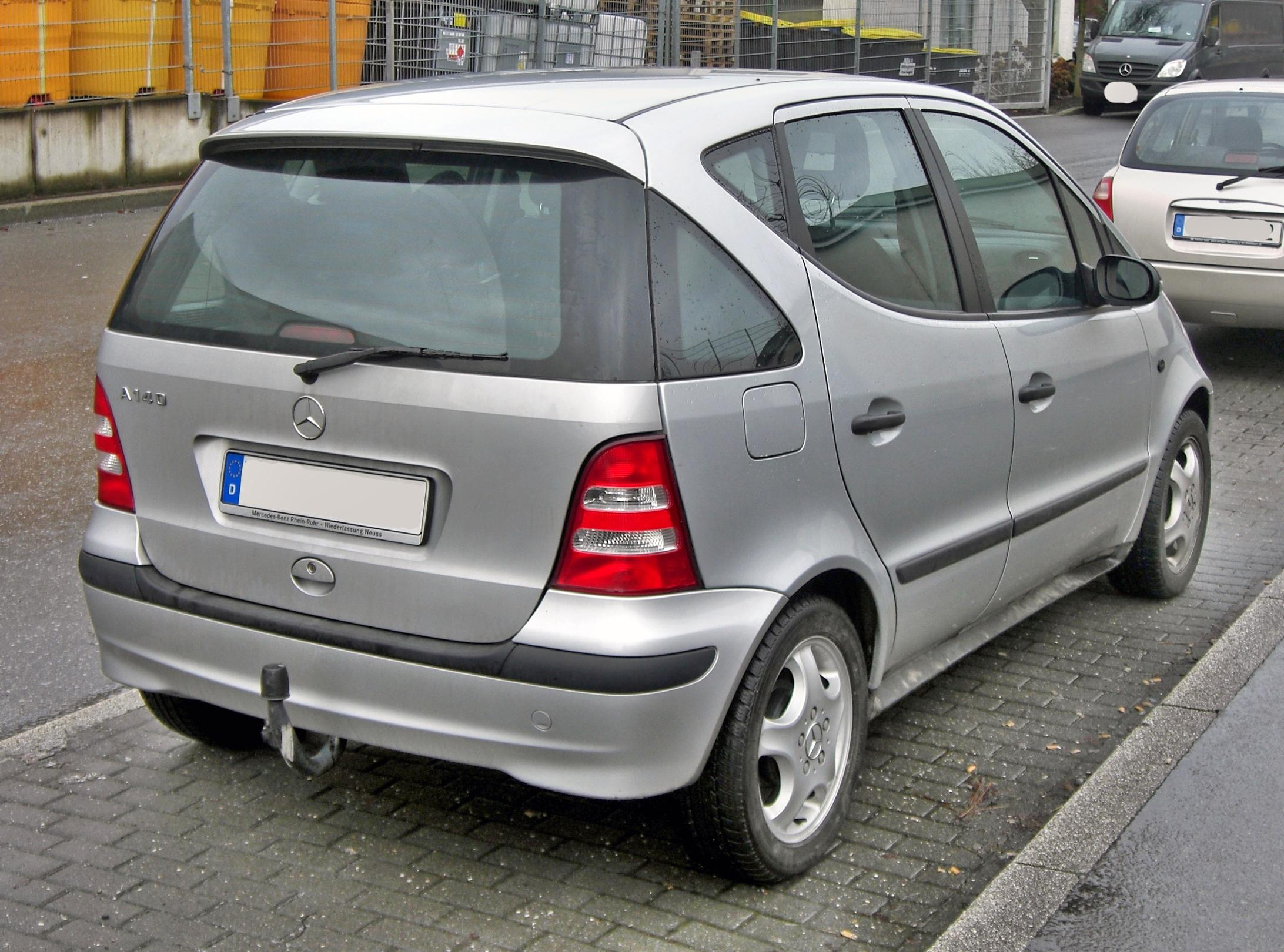
2001–2004 Facelift A 140 Classic

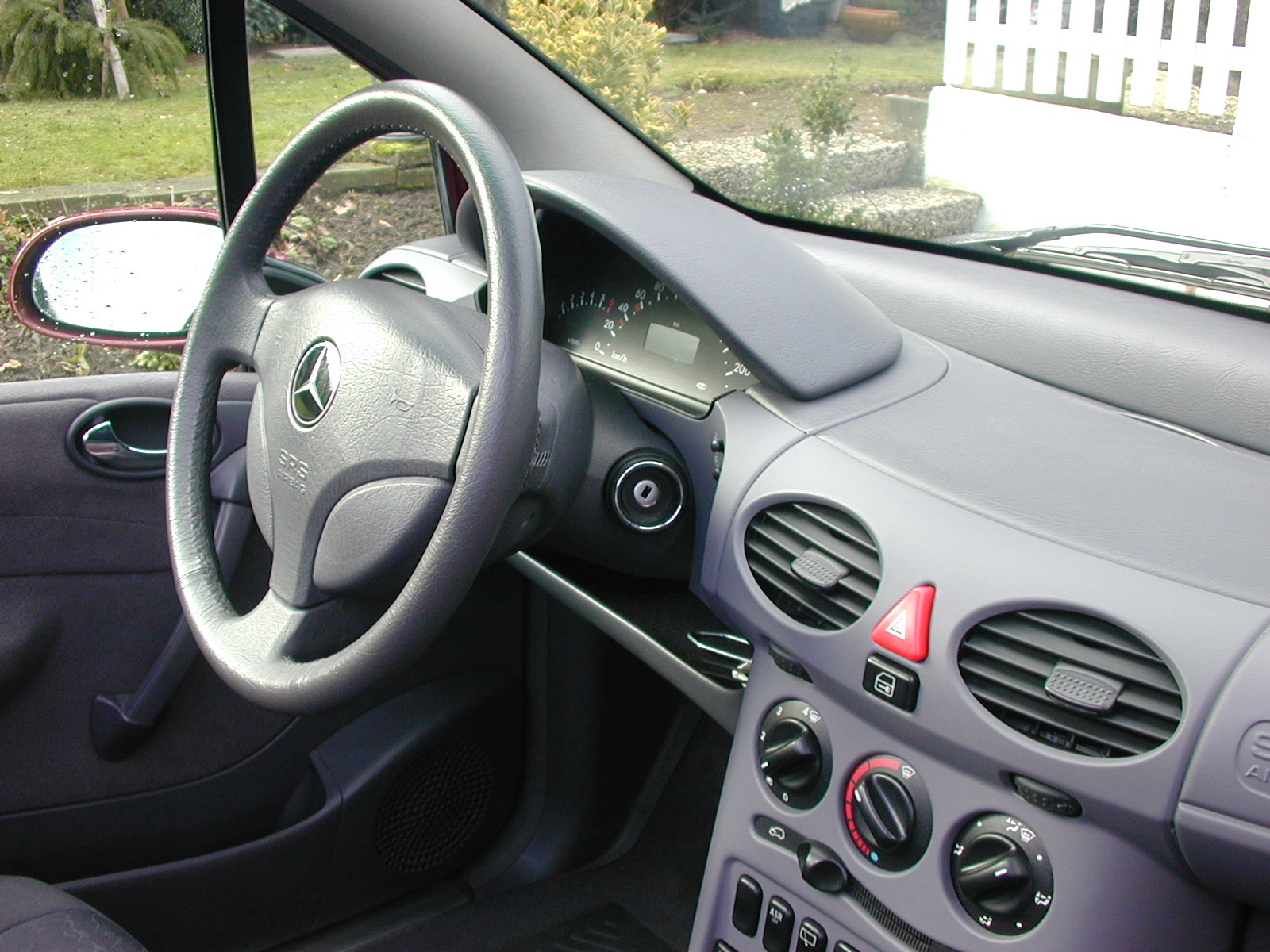
Pre-facelift Interior

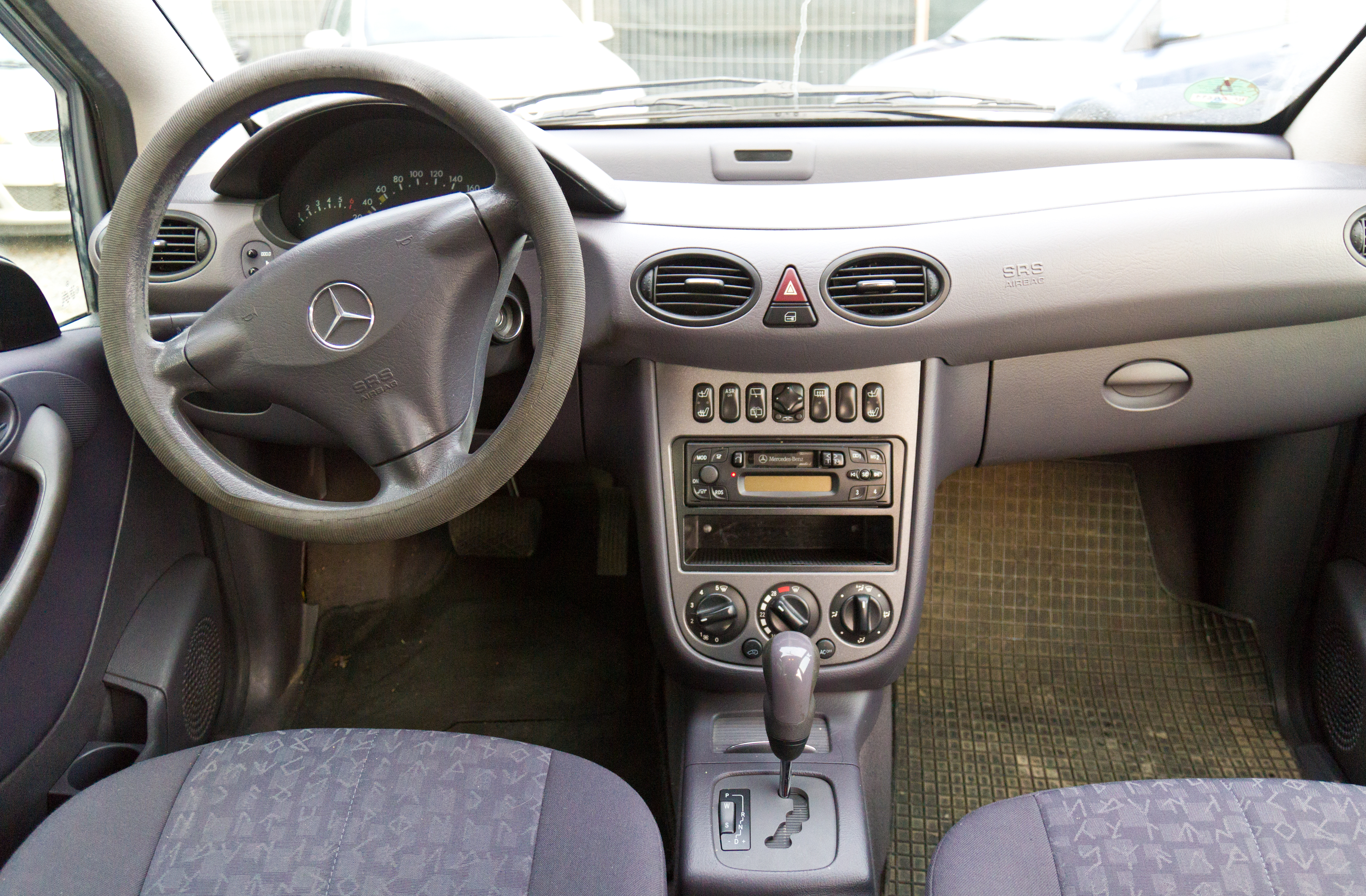
Facelift Interior

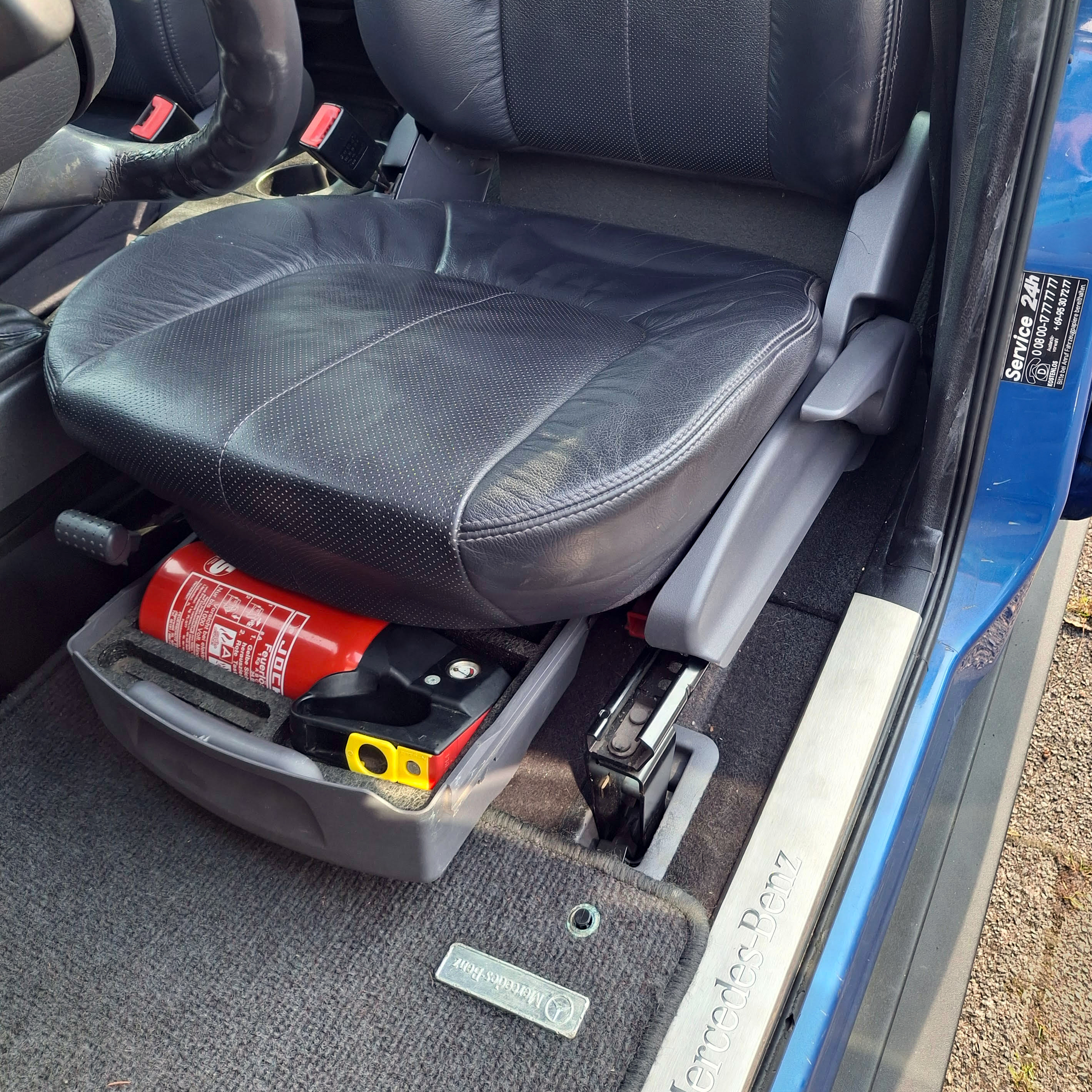
Fire extinguisher in a box, factory option

=== Safety ===
Test	Score	Points
Overall:	N/A	N/A
Adult occupant:	4/5 stars	27

ANCAP test results* Mercedes-Benz A-Class A140 5 door hatch (2001)
Test	Score
Overall	4 /5 stars
Frontal offset	11.26/16
Side impact	16/16
Pole	Not Assessed
Seat belt reminders	0/3
Whiplash protection	Not Assessed
Pedestrian protection	Not Assessed
Electronic stability control	Not Assessed

=== Production ===
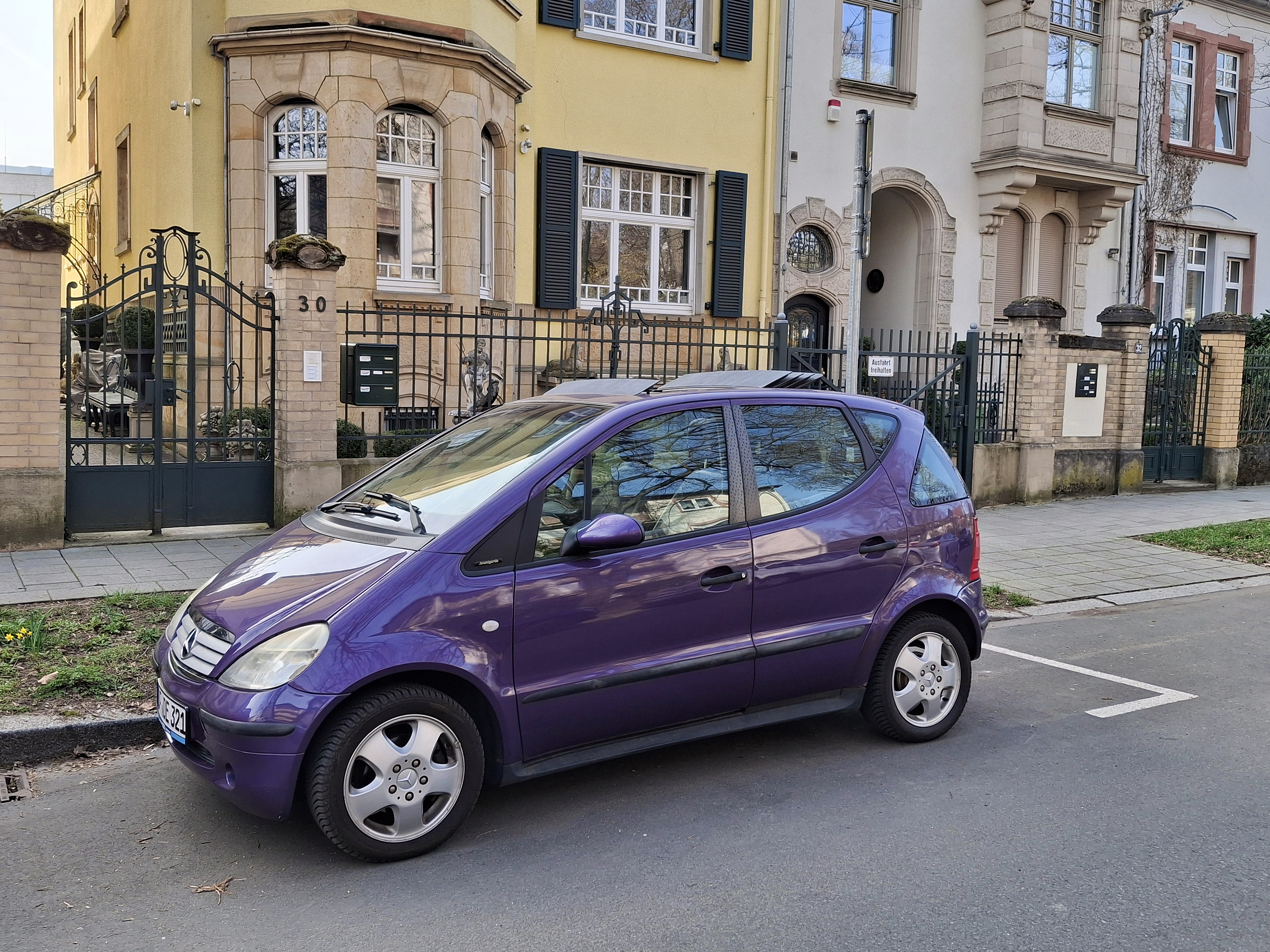
For the A-Class, numerous special color tones were developed. The color shade Novaviolet (730) is offered again by Mercedes-Benz as of 2026 as part of its MANUFAKTUR program.

DaimlerChrysler invested EUR 900 million in developing the Rastatt plant where the A-Class is produced, and created 1600 new jobs (for a total of 4700). A further 600 people work in the office building at the plant site.

Mercedes-Benz began W168 production on 17 February 1999 at its new Brazilian facility in Juiz de Fora, Minas Gerais. The Brazilian plant was the company's first factory in South America dedicated to passenger cars, with an investment of US$840 million and 10,000 employees. The factory initially produced A-Class and C-Class models, assembling them from pieces manufactured in Germany. The target for the cars was regional markets (from Argentina to Mexico) with modifications made to the cars to suit local conditions, like a protection for the motor base. By May 2004 production stopped in Rastatt plant. In September 2005 Brazilian Juiz de Fora factory stopped production of A-Class cars.

==== A210 EVOLUTION ====
The Mercedes-Benz A 210 Evolution is a limited-production, high-performance variant of the first-generation A-Class (W168). While Mercedes-AMG initially conceptualized a supercharged flagship model for the line, the company ultimately developed a more balanced iteration emphasizing refined ride comfort, daily utility, and mechanical reliability. Released as a derivative of the A 190, the A 210 Evolution was limited to 2,629 units and was produced exclusively in silver or black paint finishes. It represents only the second model in Mercedes-Benz history to utilize the "Evolution" designation.

==== Mercedes-Benz A-Class "F-Cell" (2004) ====
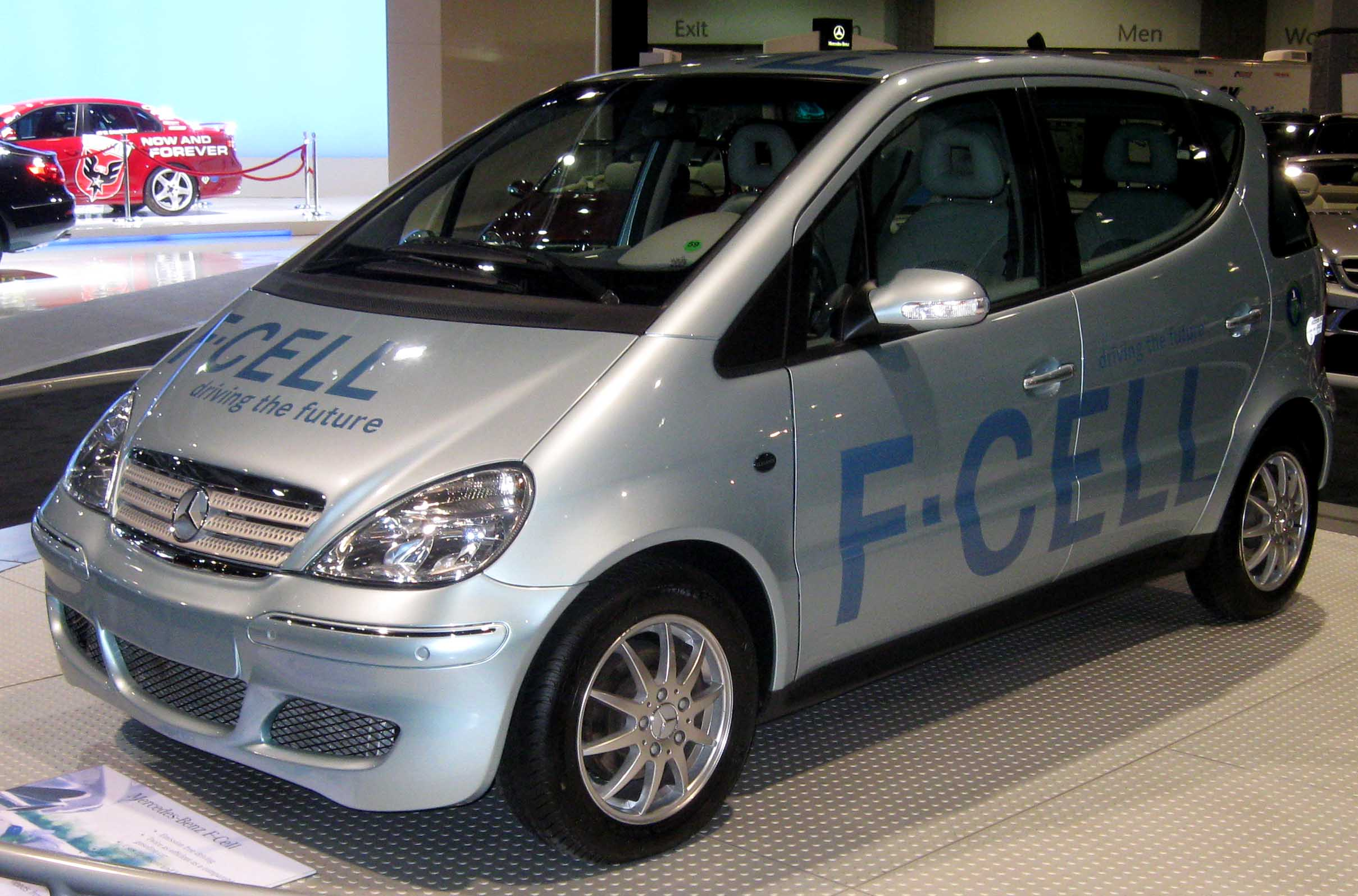
Mercedes-Benz A-Class F-Cell concept

It is a version of 5-door A-Class hydrogen fuel cell vehicle with 88 PS (65 kW; 87 hp) electric motor. It has a driving range of 160 km (99 mi).

Three A-Class F-Cell cars were used in the 2003 Frankfurt International Motor Show for press shuttle service. On 18 June 2004, 4 production F-Cell vehicles were delivered to Deutsche Telekom and BEWAG/Vattenfall Europe in Berlin.

In 2007, the A-Class F-Cell were delivered to Landsvirkjun and Reykjavik Energy.

A DHL version of F-Cell was unveiled in FC EXPO 2008.

=== Reception ===
According to a 2008 British customer satisfaction survey by Which?, the A-Class with manufacture years between 1998 and 2004 came third from bottom out of 217 models surveyed with a score of 65 percent.

== Second generation (W169; 2004) ==
Second generation
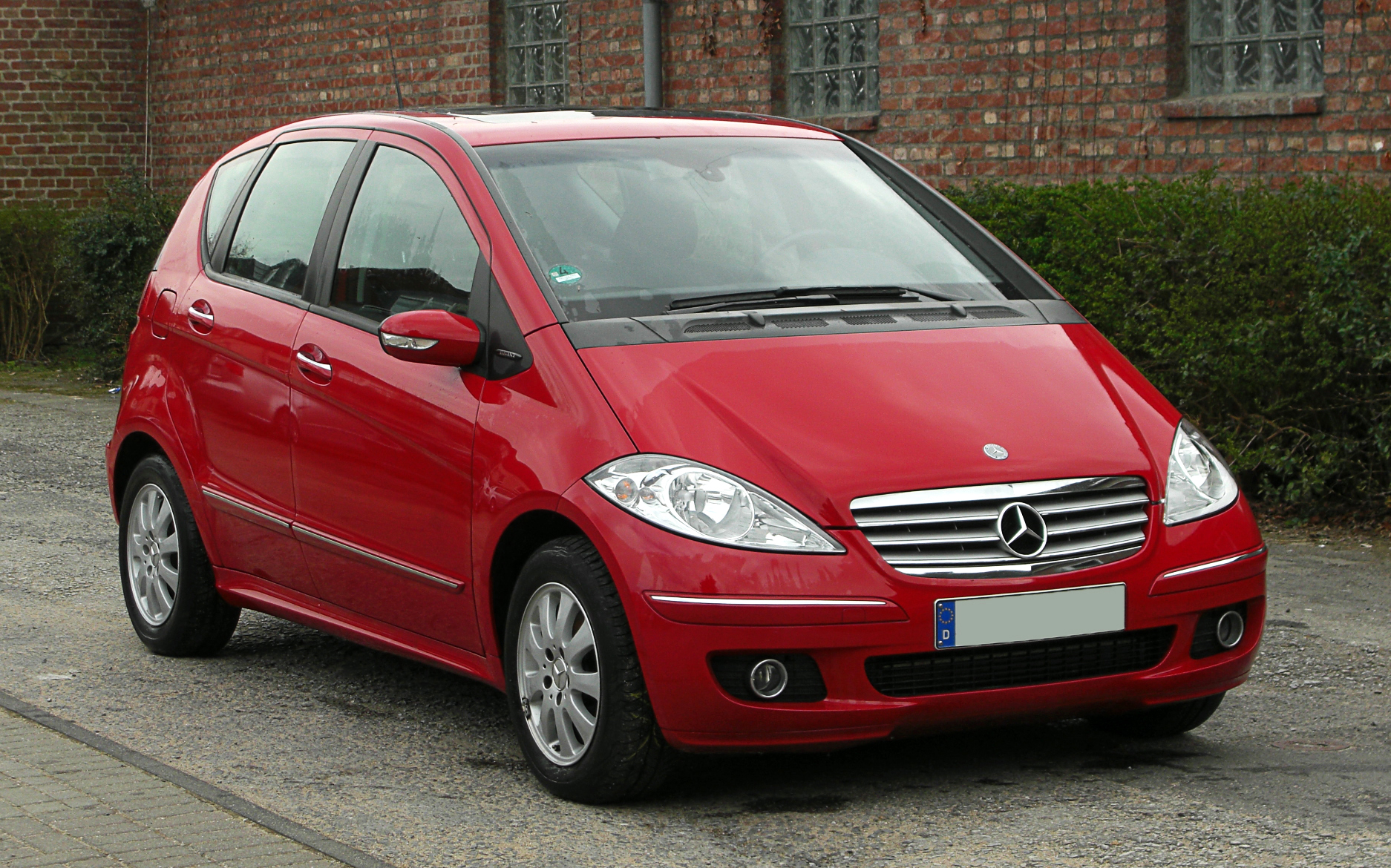

Overview
- Model code: W169
- Production: June 2004 – 2012
- Assembly: Germany: Rastatt; Thailand: Samut Prakan (TAAP)

Body and chassis
- Body style: 3-door hatchback; 5-door hatchback
- Related: Mercedes-Benz B-Class (W245)

Powertrain
- Engine: Petrol: 1.5 L M266 I4; 1.7 L M266 I4; 2.0 L M266 I4; 2.0 L M266 I4 (turbo); Diesel: 2.0 L OM640 CDI I4 (turbo)
- Transmission: 5-speed manual; 6-speed manual; CVT

Dimensions
- Wheelbase: 2,568 mm (101.1 in)
- Length: 3,838 mm (151.1 in) (2004); 3,883 mm (152.9 in) (2008)
- Width: 1,764 mm (69.4 in)
- Height: 1,593 mm (62.7 in)

=== Initial release ===
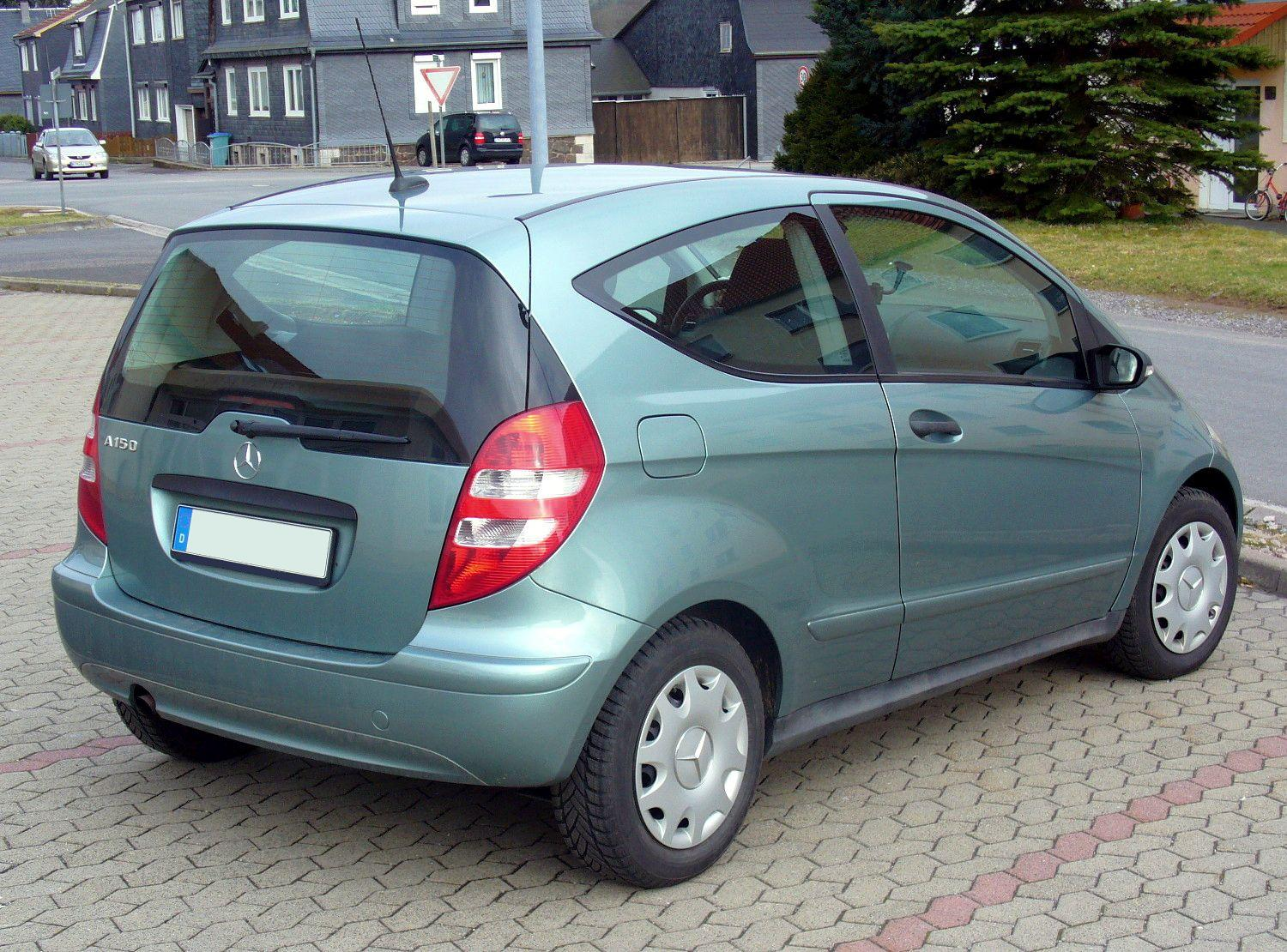
Pre-facelift A 150 3-door

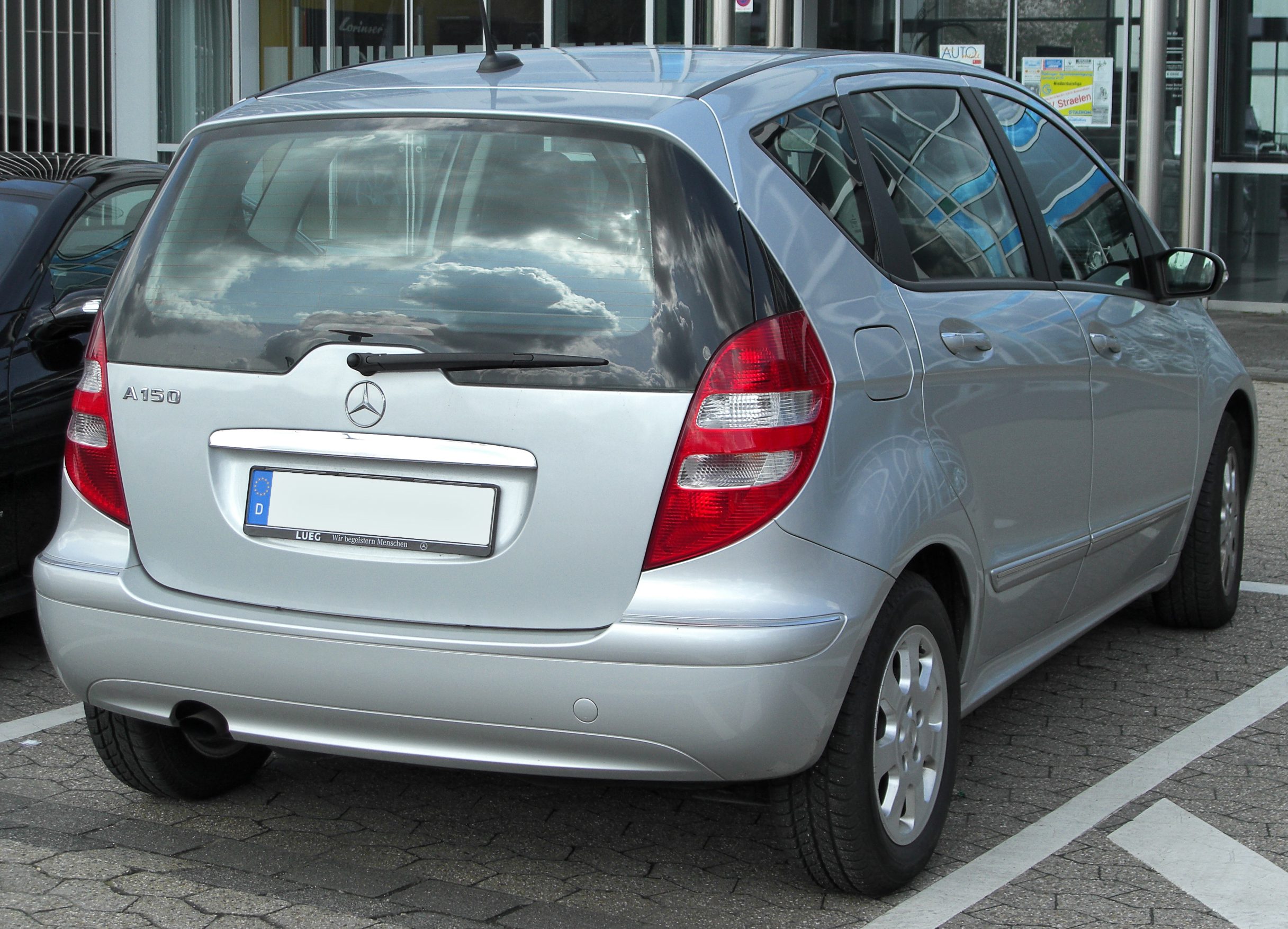
Pre-facelift A 150 Elegance 5-door

The W169 used high-strength steel alloys with bonded joints. Standard equipment included front as well as combined head and thorax-protection side airbags. The front airbags were adaptive with two-stage gas generators operating according to the severity of accident. Optionally rear side airbags (for side-impacts in the backseats) and side-curtain airbags were available.

The force exerted by the seat belt system during a collision adapted dynamically to collision characteristics. The 'active' head restraints (standard for driver and front passenger) were designed to reduce neck injury, especially in rear collisions.

The cargo capacity of the W169 was increased by 15 percent over the W168.

Seven four-cylinder engines were available: four petrol (gasoline) (A 150, A 170, A 200, A 200 Turbo) and three diesel (A 160 CDI, A 180 CDI, A 200 CDI) partnered with either five- or six-speed manual gearbox. A continuously variable transmission system called "Autotronic Constantly Variable Transmission" (CVT) is an optional feature.

The petrol A 200 Turbo provides 193 hp (144 kW) and 280 N⋅m (207 lb⋅ft) of torque (rotational force); the diesel A 200 CDI has 140 hp (104 kW) and 300 N⋅m (221 lb⋅ft).

The most powerful engine achieved 0-100 km/h (62 mph) in 8.0 seconds with a top speed of 218 km/h (135 mph). The newly developed direct-injection CDI diesel units use a common-rail direct injection system that improves fuel consumption and reduces exhaust emissions and engine noise.

All the engines met EU4 emissions limits. A particulate filter system was available as an option for the diesel units to reduce particulate emissions by about 99% without the need for additives.

The A-Class was a front wheel drive car and featured traction control (ASR) as standard, as well as electronic stability control and anti-lock brakes (ABS).

Handling was improved by precision tracking and anti-roll support, and by a Parabolic Rear Axle.

A "Selective Damping System", in which the shock absorber forces respond differently according to conditions, was standard. For example, under normal conditions it operated at soft absorption; while cornering at speed it changes to full damping force.

Sales of the W169 were targeted at 50,000 units in 2004. Dr. Joachim Schmidt, Executive Vice President Sales and Marketing, Mercedes Car Group, said that target had been reached even before vehicles arrived in dealer showrooms.

Japan models went on sale in 2005-02-04. Early models include 5-door right drive versions of A 170, A 170 Elegance, A 200 Elegance. 5-door right drive version of A 200 TURBO Elegance was added in 2005-11-10. Due to the body width being larger than 1700 mm, it could not be registered as small car in Japan. (See Vehicle size class#Japan)

=== 2008 update ===
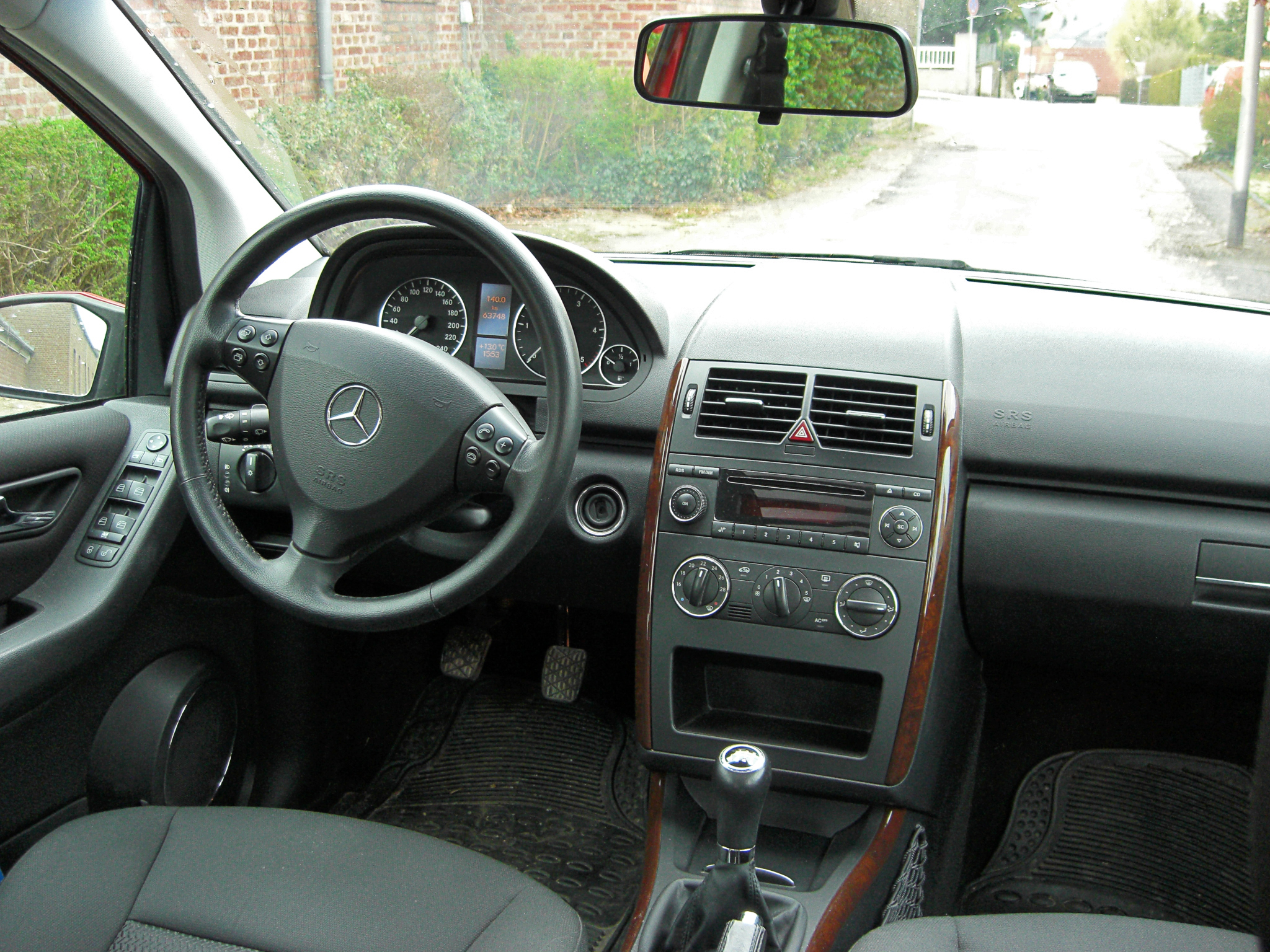
Pre-facelift interior

The W169 Model facelift changes included redesigned front and rear fascias and lights, and optional stop-start function on A 150 and 170 models. Active Park Assist enables the car to parallel park itself, with only throttle and brake inputs required from the driver.

The five-door Hatchback and the three-door Coupé vehicles debuted in spring 2008, alongside the refreshed 2009 M-Class and B-Class. Early models include A 160 CDI, A 180 CDI, A 200 CDI, A 150, A 170, A 200, A 200 TURBO.

Japan models went on sale in late August 2008. Early models 5-door versions of A 170, A 170 Elegance. Japan models of A 170 was renamed to A 180 in August 2009.

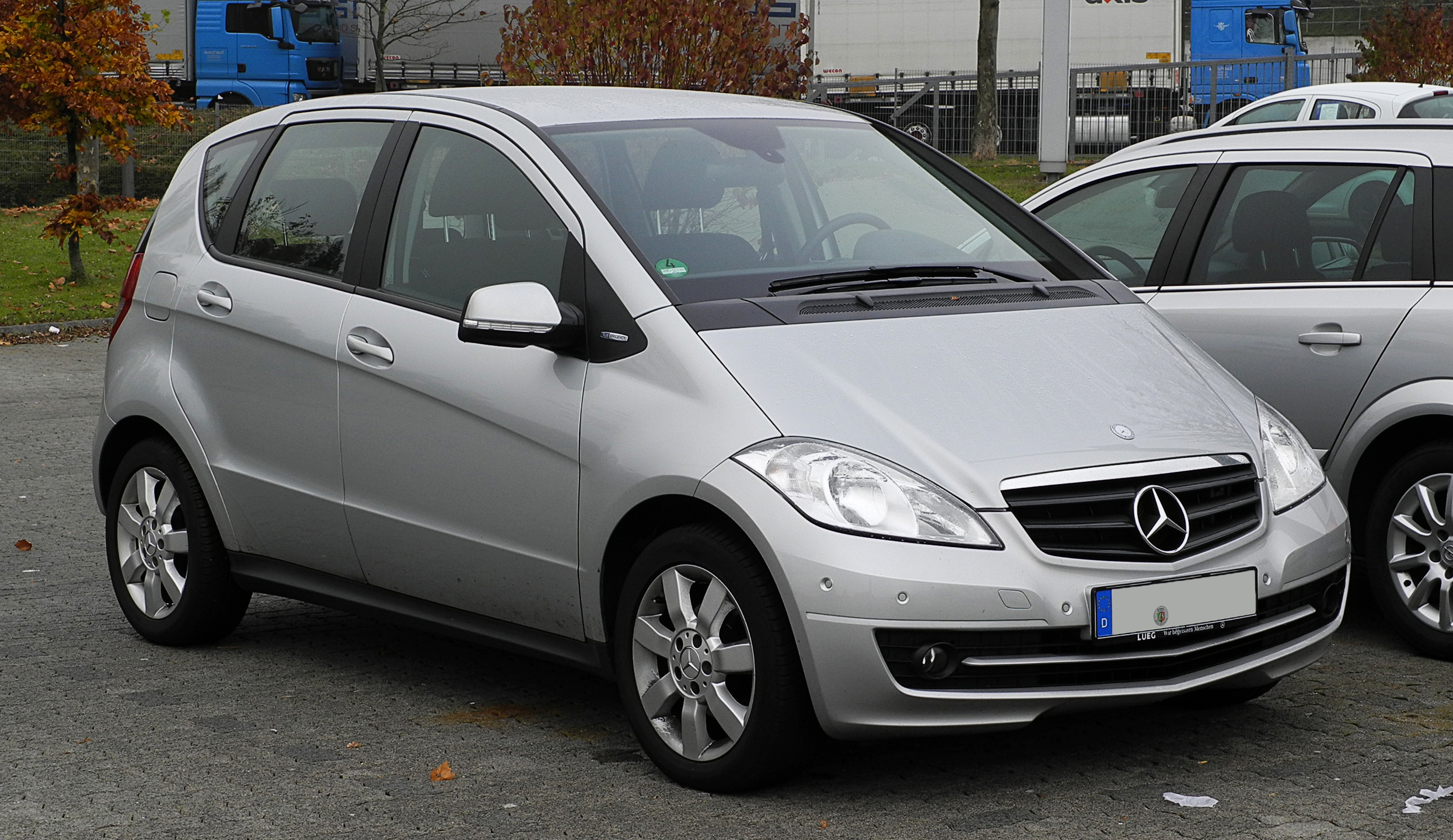
Facelift A 160 5-door

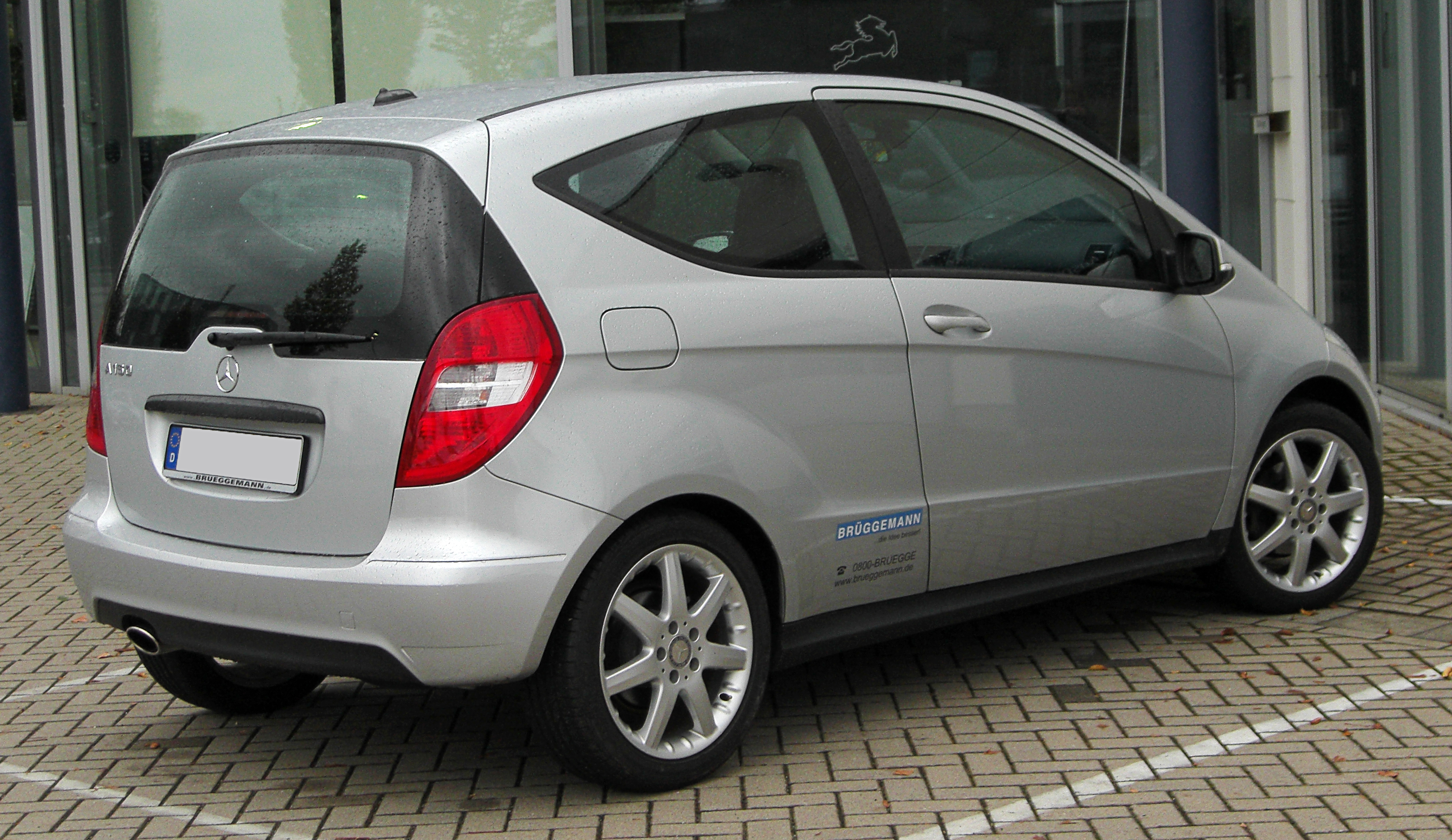
Facelift A 150 3-door

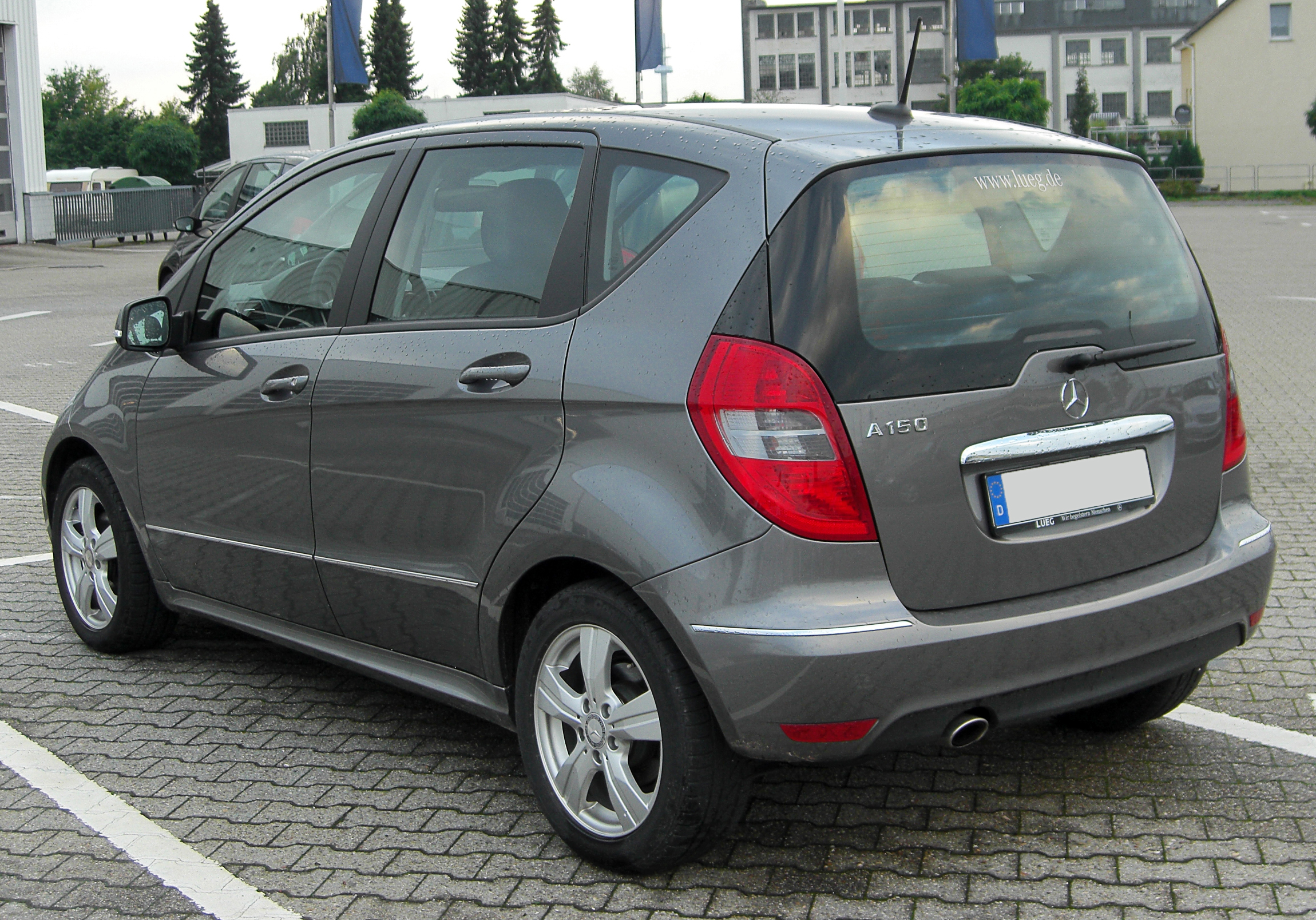
Facelift A 150 Avantgarde 5-door

==== A-Class Special Edition 2009 (2009) ====
The Special Edition is a limited (5500 units) version for all model variants of the A-Class. It includes the BlueEfficiency package, black radiator louvres, 16-inch titanium silver light-alloy wheels in a new 9-spoke design (tyre size 195/55 R16), a "Special Edition" badge on the mirror triangle, two-tone colour scheme in black and grey, Audio 20 radio with CD player and Bluetooth hands-free system and the Light and Sight package with a rain sensor, automatically dimming rear-view mirror, an illuminated vanity mirror in the sun visor, separately adjustable reading lights in the rear, a reading light for the driver and illuminated front foot wells, Seating Comfort package (height-adjustable front passenger seat, seat cushion angle adjustment and lumbar supports for the driver and front passenger). Standard exterior features also include fog lamps and a free choice of metallic paint finish.

==== Mercedes-Benz A-Class E-CELL (2010) ====
The Mercedes-Benz A-Class E-CELL was introduced in September 2010 and debuted at the October 2010 Paris Motor Show. The E-Cell has a range of 200 kilometres (120 mi) capable of developing a peak output of 70 kW (94 hp), a continuous power rating of 50 kW (67 hp) and a maximum torque of 290 N·m (214 lb·ft). The Mercedes A-Class E-Cell can accelerate from 0–60 km/h (37 mph) in 5.5 seconds, and its top speed is 150 km/h (93 mph).

Tesla Motors, as part of its collaboration with Mercedes-Benz, built electric powertrain components for the E-Cell. The 36 kWh battery contains approximately 4,000 individual lithium-ion cells. Mercedes has developed a modular system for electric vehicles with battery and fuel-cell. This system allows the efficient use of shared parts in all the brand's electric vehicles. Thanks to the modular approach the electric drive of the A‑Class E‑Cell is also used in the B‑Class F‑Cell, and the energy storage units in the A‑Class EV are the same as the battery in the Smart fortwo electric drive.

A limited production of 500 A-Class E-Cell electric cars will be built, for trial purposes, at the Mercedes Rastatt plant, near Stuttgart beginning in September 2010. As part of a demonstration program, the cars will be leased to selected customers in several European countries, including Germany, France, and the Netherlands. Daimler is not planning to sell the electric version outside Europe.

==== A 180 Final Edition (2012) ====
Mercedes offered 300 examples of the A 180 Final Edition in a 5-door, righthand drive configuration for the Japanese market. It included calcite white body colour, black interior colour, sport package (chrome exhaust tip, 17-inch 7-spoke alloy wheels, chrome iridium silver front grille, stainless acceleration and brake pedals with rubber stud, leather wrapped sport steering wheel and silver shift knob, silver meter panel), bi-xenon headlights and headlight washer, cornering lights, fog lamps (front/rear), rain sensor, sun visor with illuminating mirror, anti-glare mirrors, 'Final Edition' emblem, and floor mats with 'Final Edition' silver logo plates.

The vehicle went on sale on 28 May 2012.

=== Technical data ===
Specification	A 160 CDI	A 180 CDI	A 200 CDI	A 150	A 170	A 200	A 200 Turbo
Length	3,838 mm (151.1 in)						
Width	1,764 mm (69.4 in)						
Height	1,593 mm (62.7 in)						
Wheelbase	2,568 mm (101.1 in)						
Luggage (l)	435–1995						
(3 doors)	435–1485						
Empty weight (5-doors)	1,325 kg (2,921 lb)	1,345 kg (2,965 lb)	1,365 kg (3,009 lb)	1,225 kg (2,701 lb)	1,240 kg (2,734 lb)		1,305 kg (2,877 lb)
(3 doors)	1,300 kg (2,866 lb)	1,320 kg (2,910 lb)	1,340 kg (2,954 lb)	1,195 kg (2,635 lb)	1,210 kg (2,668 lb)		1,275 kg (2,811 lb)
Tank Capacity	54 L (14.3 US gal; 11.9 imp gal)						
Tank Reserve	6 L (1.6 US gal; 1.3 imp gal)						
Cylinders	diesel 4/in-line 4-valv/cyl - Gasoline 4/in-line 2-valv/cyl						
Displacement cc	1991	1991	1991	1498	1699	2034	2034
Engine	2.0L Turbo Diesel			1.5L Petrol	1.7L Petrol	2.0 Petrol	2.0 Turbo Petrol
Fuel per 100 km	4.9L	5.2L	5.4L	6.2L	6.6L		7.2L
Rated Output kW/hp/PS (rpm)	60/80/82 (4200)	80/107/109 (4200)	103/138/140 (4200)	70/94/95 (5200)	85/114/116 (5500)	100/134/136 (5750)	142/190/193 (4850)
Rated Torque	180 N⋅m (133 lb⋅ft) (1400–2600)	250 N⋅m (184 lb⋅ft) (1600–2600)	300 N⋅m (221 lb⋅ft) (1600–2600)	140 N⋅m (103 lb⋅ft) (3500–4000)	155 N⋅m (114 lb⋅ft) (3500–4000)	185 N⋅m (136 lb⋅ft) (3500–4000)	280 N⋅m (207 lb⋅ft) (1800–4850)
Acceleration 0–100 km/h (0-62 mph) (sec)	15.0	10.8	9.5	12.6	10.9	9.9	8.0
Top Speed	165 km/h (103 mph)	184 km/h (114 mph)	202 km/h (126 mph)	173 km/h (107 mph)	188 km/h (117 mph)	195 km/h (121 mph)	218 km/h (135 mph)
Transmission	5-speed manual	6-speed manual	6-speed manual	5-speed manual	5-speed manual		6-speed manual
Wheels	6j x 15	6j x 15	6j x 16	6j x 15	6j x 15	6j x 16	6j x 16
Tires	185/65R15	185/65R15	195/55R16	185/65R15	185/65R15	195/55R16	195/55R16

Specification	W169 (5 door)	W168 (long wheelbase)	W168 (standard)
Length	3,838 mm (151.1 in)	3,776 mm (148.7 in)	3,606 mm (142.0 in)
Width	1,764 mm (69.4 in)	1,719 mm (67.7 in)	1,719 mm (67.7 in)
Height	1,593 mm (62.7 in)	1,589 mm (62.6 in)	1,575 mm (62.0 in)
Wheelbase	2,568 mm (101.1 in)	2,593 mm (102.1 in)	2,423 mm (95.4 in)
VDA boot capacity L	435–1370	470–1180	390–1040

=== Production ===
As of 4 December 2006, 371,700 second generation A-Class units had been sold since September 2004, making it a total of 1,500,000 A-Class produced at DaimlerChrysler's Rastatt plant in ten years.

As of 26 June 2009, the 750,000th second generation A-Class vehicle was built at the Rastatt plant.

As of 1 February 2012, 1 million second generation A-Class vehicles had been delivered since autumn 2004.

In 2021, the Mercedes A-Class achieved the title of 4th best-selling car in the UK having achieved a total of 30,710 registrations.

=== Safety ===
ANCAP test results* Mercedes-Benz A-Class (2005)
Test	Score
Overall	5 /5 stars
Frontal offset	14.96/16
Side impact	16/16
Pole	2/2
Seat belt reminders	3/3
Whiplash protection	Not Assessed
Pedestrian protection	Marginal
Electronic stability control	Standard

== Third generation (W176; 2012) ==
Third generation
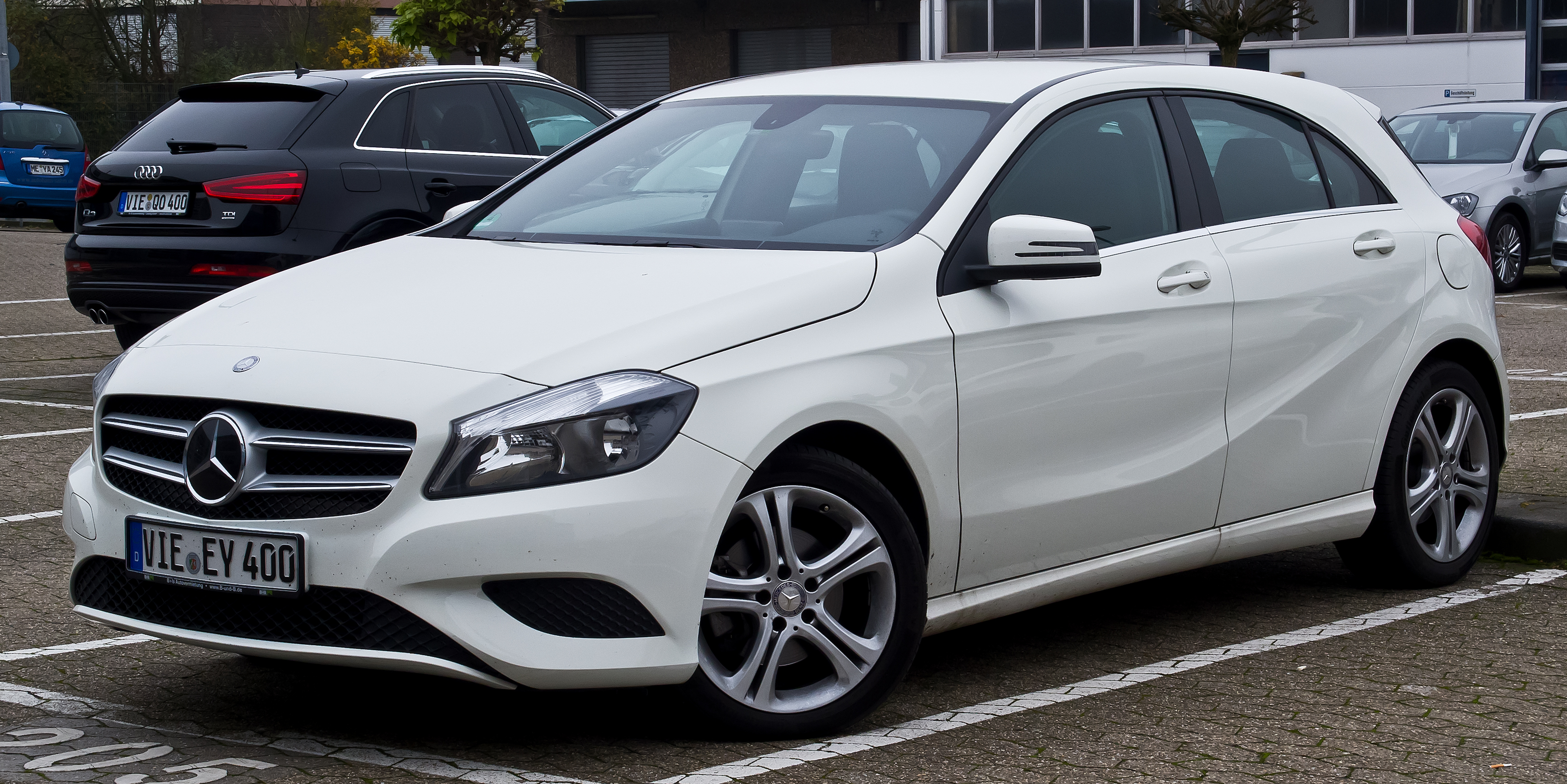
- 2014 Mercedes-Benz A 180 Urban 5-door hatchback pre-facelift (Germany)

Overview
- Model code: W176
- Production: July 2012 – May 2018 (Germany); August 2013 – May 2018 (Finland)
- Model years: 2013–2018
- Assembly: Germany: Rastatt; Finland: Uusikaupunki (Valmet)

Body and chassis
- Body style: 5-door hatchback
- Platform: Mercedes-Benz MFA

The model was introduced at the 2012 Geneva Motor Show officially as a subcompact executive / C-segment model for the first time after being a supermini / B-segment for fifteen years. This model does not offer a 3-door model, due to the decreasing popularity of 3-door models and its larger size. The W176 was available in some markets from September 2012. Models in the Japanese market went on sale in January 2013.

The design for the third generation of A-Class was based on the 2011 Concept A-Class and was unveiled at the 2012 Geneva Motor Show. The facelifted model of the W176 was presented in Q3 2015. Orders for the facelifted model had started in July 2015, and mass production started in September. The facelift had added updated lights, technology, and models. The model was initially built exclusively in Rastatt. However, from late 2013 it was also built in Uusikaupunki, Finland for certain countries.

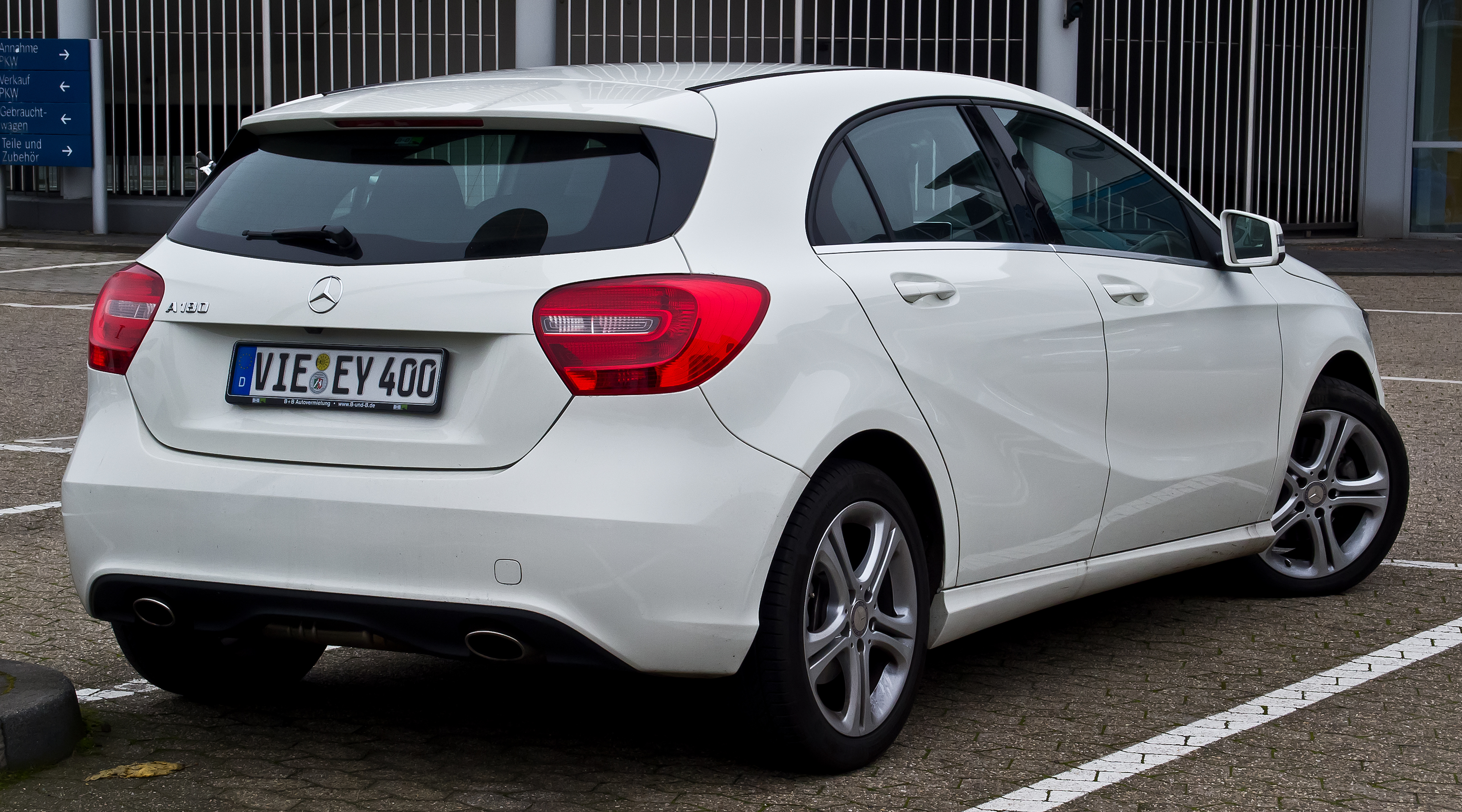
Rear view

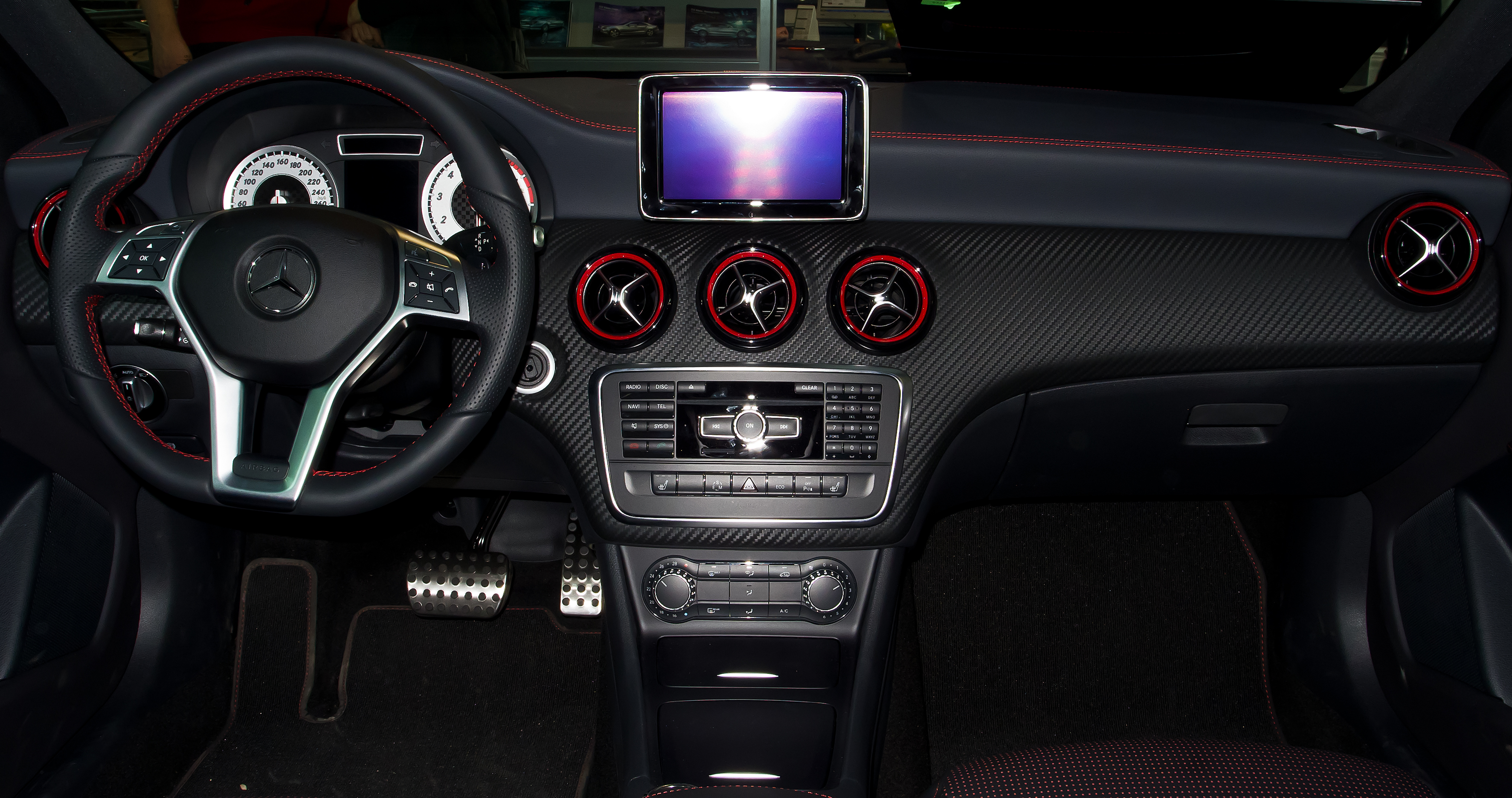
Interior

== Fourth generation (W177; 2018) ==
Fourth generation
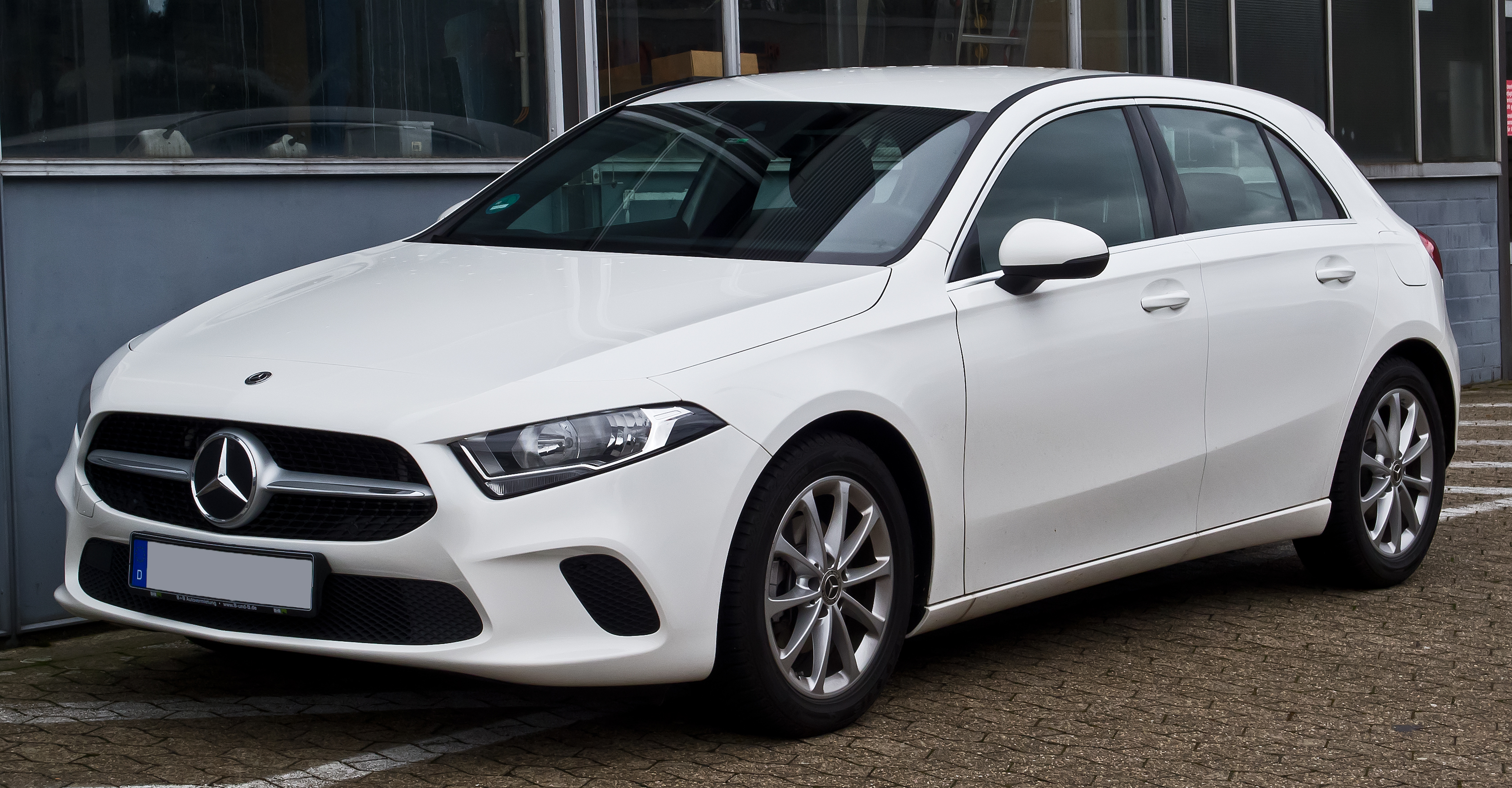
- 2019 Mercedes-Benz A 180 Progressive 5-door hatchback pre-facelift (Germany)

Overview
- Model code: W177
- Production: April 2018 – present
- Model years: 2018–present

Body and chassis
- Body style: 5-door hatchback 4-door sedan
- Platform: MFA2

The W177 hatchback was launched in 2018 as the successor to the W176 Mercedes-Benz A-Class and sales commenced in March 2018. It is available as a 5-door hatchback (W177 model code), 4-door sedan (V177), and a long-wheelbase sedan exclusive to China (Z177). In North America, the hatchback is available in Canada and Mexico, but in the US, only the sedan is available.

The fourth generation A-Class hatchback was unveiled to media in February 2018 in Amsterdam ahead of its public debut at the 2018 Geneva Motor Show. At launch Mercedes-Benz revealed the vehicle's "predator face", which is also implemented in the C257 CLS and C118 CLA, which will not spread throughout the brand's entire range of cars.

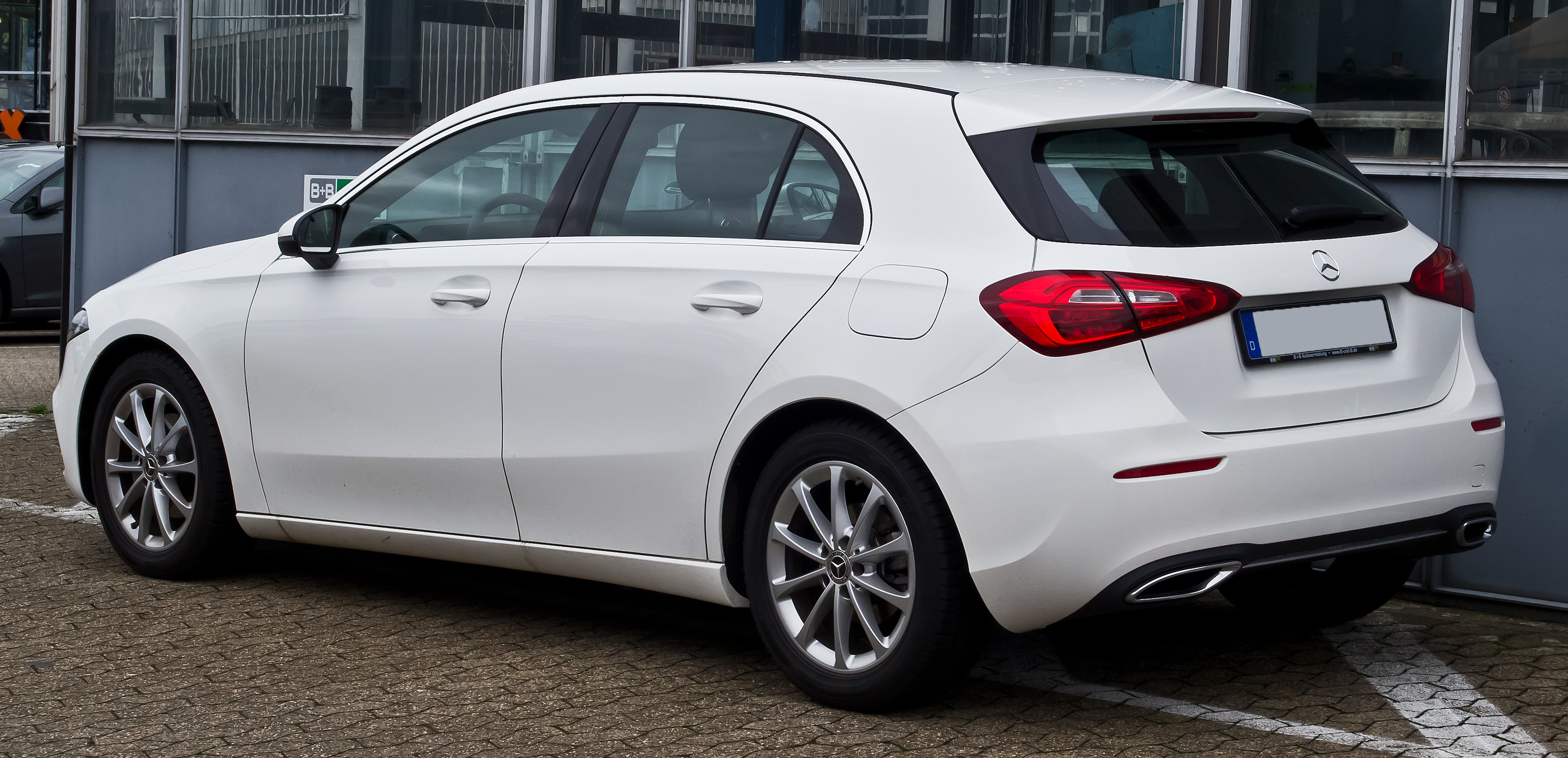
Rear view

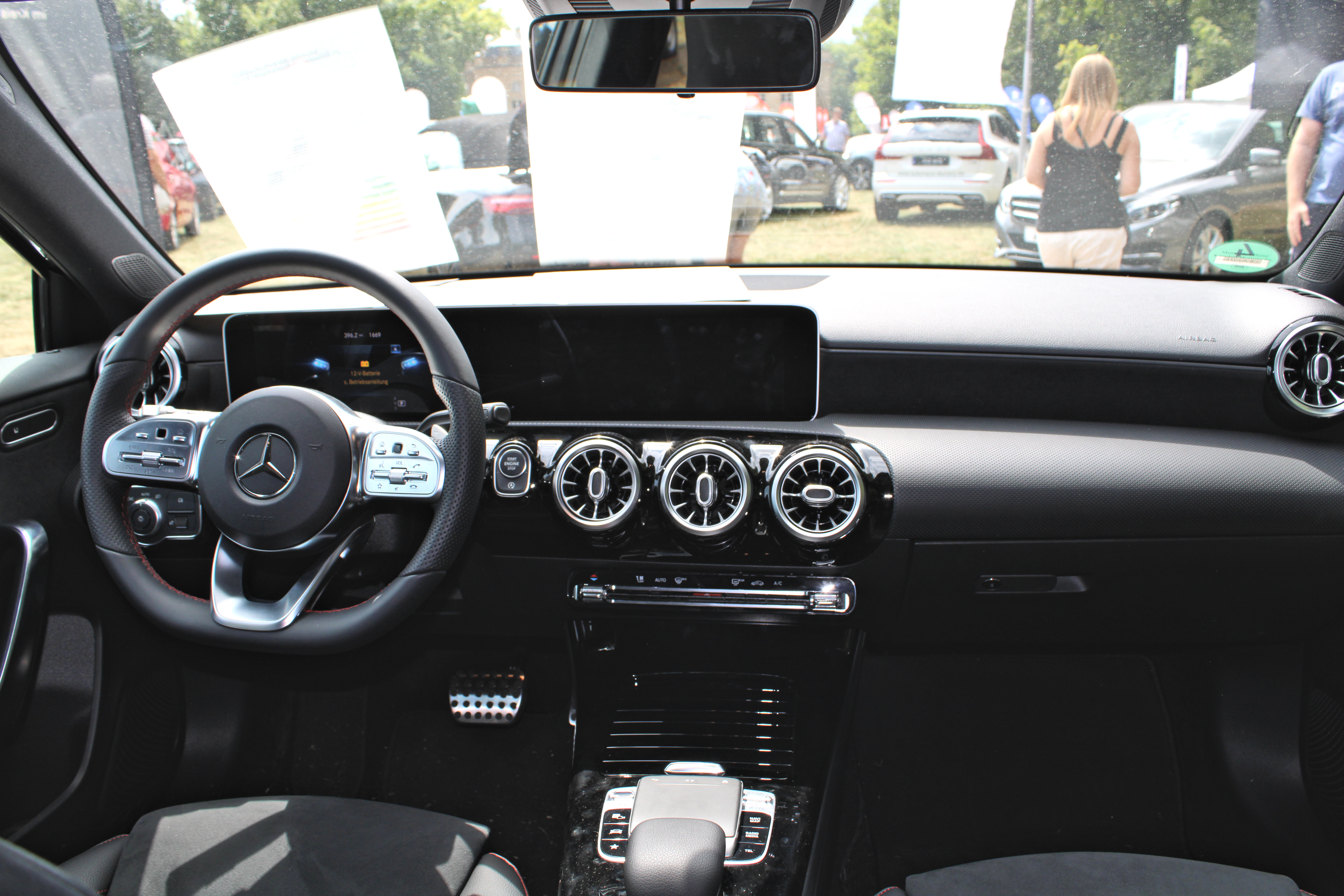
Interior

== Sales ==
Year	Europe	Australia	China
1997	6,184		
1998	118,058		
1999	177,275		
2000	168,897		
2001	161,962		
2002	149,327		
2003	130,051		
2004	126,294		
2005	173,548		
2006	148,001		
2007	136,349		
2008	125,671		
2009	109,568		
2010	106,983		
2011	88,025		
2012	70,108		
2013	131,258		
2014	121,231	4,676	
2015	119,475	3,629	
2016	141,800	4,335	
2017	143,550	4,768	
2018	153,882	4,175	
2019	198,926	4,689	
2020	158,955	6,054	
2021	118,439	3,793	
2022		2,840	
2023		2,392	51,503
2024		1,997	34,230
2025			16,157
