= Mercedes-Benz OM668 engine =

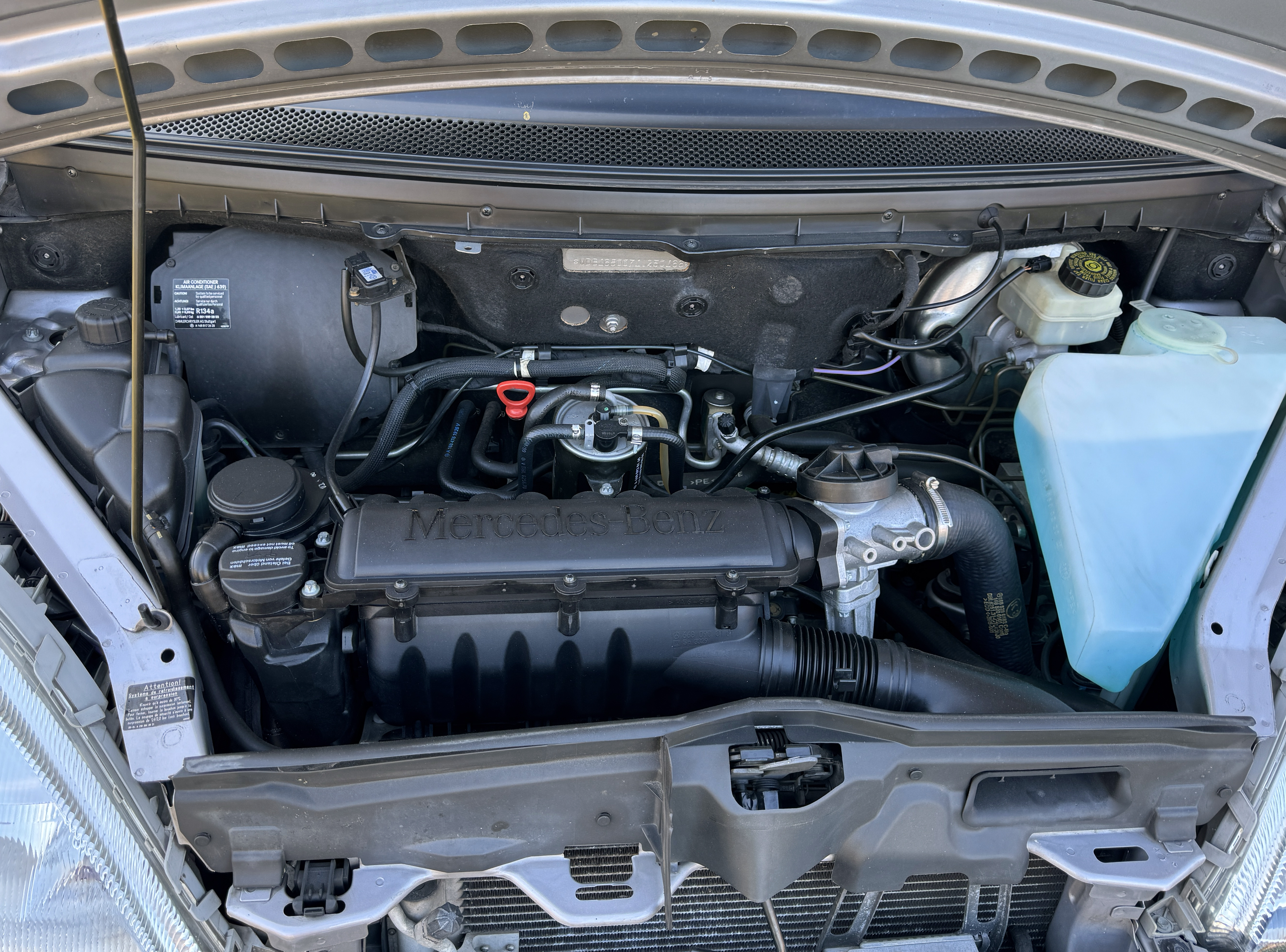

Overview
- Manufacturer: Daimler AG
- Production: 1997-

Layout
- Configuration: Inline-four engine
- Displacement: 1.7 L (1,689 cc)
- Cylinder bore: 80 mm (3.1 in)
- Piston stroke: 84 mm (3.3 in)
- Valvetrain: DOHC 4 valves x cyl.

Combustion
- Turbocharger: Single turbo with intercooler
- Fuel system: Common Rail
- Fuel type: Diesel
- Cooling system: Water cooled

Output
- Power output: 44–70 kW (60–95 PS)
- Torque output: 160–180 N⋅m (118–133 lb⋅ft)

Chronology
- Successor: Mercedes-Benz OM640

The Mercedes-Benz OM668 engine is a 1.7-litre (1,689 cc) diesel inline-four engine manufactured by the Mercedes-Benz division of Daimler AG. It was used in the Mercedes-Benz W168 from 1997 to 2004 and the Mercedes-Benz W414 from 2001 to 2005.

== Description ==
The OM 668 makes use of the common rail system. Compared to the otto engine M 166 it has 4 valves per cylinder instead of two. Two chain driven overhead camshafts are used. The intake camshaft is driven by a chain, the exhaust camshaft is connected to the intake camshaft with a gear. Another chain drives the oil pump from the crankshaft. All engines have a turbocharger and all engines with more than 44 kW (60 PS) also have an intercooler. In 1997 the OM 668 was the smallest diesel engine by Mercedes-Benz.

There are no mechanical differences between the engines, except from the 44 kW (60 PS) engine, which does not have an intercooler. In 2001, the camshaft and turbocharger were modified slightly. This increased the rated power, but not the torque, due to the weak clutch of the Mercedes-Benz W 168.

Without any physical changes to the engine, the power can be increased to 88 kW (120 PS) by simply changing the software of the ECU. This does not decrease the durability of the robust engine. Due to the increased torque of up to 200 N⋅m (148 lb⋅ft), the clutch of the W 168 may wear out faster, if the rated power is increased. The OM668 later developed into the Thielert Centurion 1.7 aero engine

== Models ==
Engine*	Name	Power	Torque	Model
OM 668 DE 17 A	668.941	44 kW (60 PS; 59 hp) at 3600 rpm	160 N⋅m (118 lb⋅ft) at 1500–2400 rpm	A 160 CDI (1997 - 2001)
OM 668 DE 17 LA red.	668.940 red.	55 kW (75 PS; 74 hp) at 3600 rpm	160 N⋅m (118 lb⋅ft) at 1500–2800 rpm	A 160 CDI (2001 - 2004) and Vaneo CDI
OM 668 DE 17 LA	668.940	66 kW (90 PS; 89 hp) at 4200 rpm	180 N⋅m (133 lb⋅ft) at 1600–3200 rpm	A 170 CDI (1997 - 2001) and Vaneo 1.7 CDI
OM 668 DE 17 LA	668.942	70 kW (95 PS; 94 hp) at 4200 rpm	180 N⋅m (133 lb⋅ft) at 1600–3600 rpm	A 170 CDI (2001 - 2004)

*OM = Oelmotor (diesel engine),
668 = engine series,
DE = Direkteinspritzung (common rail injection),
17 = approximate Displacement in dl,
A = Abgasturbolader (turbocharger),
L = Ladeluftkühler (intercooler),
red. = reduced power

== Other applications ==
The OM668 is the basis for the Thielert Centurion 1.7 aircraft engine and for the engine of concept car Rinspeed Presto.

== See also ==
- List of Mercedes-Benz engines

== Sources ==
- A-Klasse manual (MOPF 2001)
- Technical data
- W 168/OM 668 on Elchfans.de
