= M166 =

M166 may refer to:

- M-166 (Michigan highway), a state highway in Michigan
- Mercedes-Benz M166 engine, an automobile engine
- PNS Munsif (M166), a Pakistan Navy Munsif-class minehunter
