= Mercedes-Benz M166 engine =

Mercedes-Benz M166
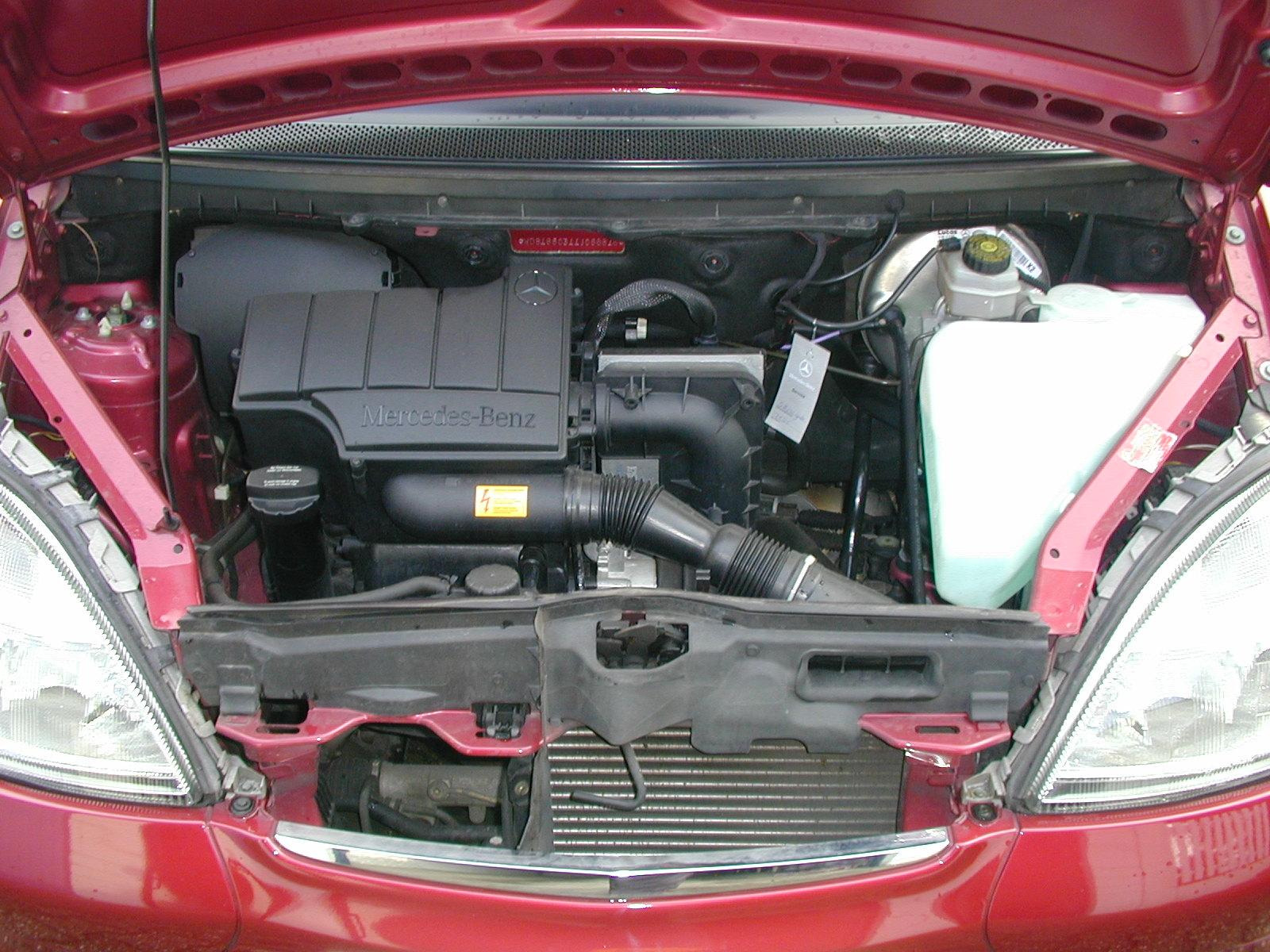

Overview
- Manufacturer: Mercedes-Benz
- Production: 1997 – 2005

Layout
- Configuration: Inline-four engine
- Displacement: 1.4 L (1,397 cc); 1.6 L (1,598 cc); 1.9 L (1,898 cc); 2.1 L (2,084 cc)
- Cylinder bore: 80 mm (3.15 in) (M166 E14, E16); 84 mm (3.31 in) (M166 E19, E21)
- Piston stroke: 69.5 mm (2.74 in) (1.4 L engines); 79.5 mm (3.13 in) (1.6 L engines); 85.6 mm (3.37 in) (1.9 L engines); 94 mm (3.70 in) (2.1 L engines)
- Cylinder block material: Aluminium alloy
- Cylinder head material: Aluminium alloy
- Valvetrain: SOHC 2 valves x cyl.
- Compression ratio: 11:1; 10.8:1 (1.9 L engines)

Combustion
- Fuel system: Multipoint injection
- Fuel type: Gasoline
- Cooling system: Water cooled

Output
- Power output: 60–103 kW (82–140 PS; 80–138 hp)
- Torque output: 130–205 N⋅m (96–151 lb⋅ft)

Chronology
- Successor: Mercedes-Benz M266 engine

The M166 is a range of inline-four engines produced by Mercedes-Benz from 1997 to 2005, before it was succeeded by the M266 engine from 2004.

== Design ==
The M166 is transversely mounted and features 2 valves per cylinder with multipoint injection. The engine is used in W168 A-Class models that feature the 'sandwich concept', where the engine is mounted at a 59-degree angle just behind the front axle. This allows for better weight distribution as well as increased safety, as the engine slides underneath the floorpan instead of into the cabin in the event of a head-on collision.

== Models ==
Engine	Displacement	Power	Torque	Years
M166 E14	1.4 L; 85.3 cu in (1,397 cc)	60 kW (82 PS; 80 hp) at 5,000 rpm	130 N⋅m (96 lb⋅ft) at 3,750 rpm	1997–2004
M166 E16 R	1.6 L; 97.5 cu in (1,598 cc)	60 kW (82 PS; 80 hp) at 5,000 rpm	140 N⋅m (103 lb⋅ft) at 2,500 rpm	1997–2005
M166 E16	1.6 L; 97.5 cu in (1,598 cc)	75 kW (102 PS; 101 hp) at 5,250 rpm	150 N⋅m (111 lb⋅ft) at 4,000 rpm	1997–2005
M166 E19	1.9 L; 115.8 cu in (1,898 cc)	92 kW (125 PS; 123 hp) at 5,500 rpm	180 N⋅m (133 lb⋅ft) at 4,000 rpm	1999–2005
M166 E21	2.1 L; 127.2 cu in (2,084 cc)	103 kW (140 PS; 138 hp) at 5,500 rpm	205 N⋅m (151 lb⋅ft) at 4,000 rpm	2002–2004

=== M166 E14 ===
- 1997–2004 W168 A140

=== M166 E16 ===
- 2001–2005 W639 Vito 1.6
- 1997–2004 W168 A160

=== M166 E19 ===
- 1999–2004 W168 A190
- 2001–2005 W639 Vito 1.9
- 2001-2005 W414 Vaneo 1.9

=== M166 E21 ===
- 2002–2004 W168 A210
