= Mercedes-Benz M266 engine =

Overview
- Manufacturer: Mercedes-Benz

Layout
- Configuration: Inline-four

Combustion
- Fuel type: Gasoline
- Cooling system: Water-cooled

Chronology
- Predecessor: Mercedes-Benz M166 engine
- Successor: Mercedes-Benz M270 engine

The M266 is a Mercedes-Benz inline-4 engine that was manufactured in Stuttgart. The most powerful engine in the family is the 2.0 turbo, found in the Mercedes-Benz B200 Turbo.

Engine	1.5	1.7	2.0	2.0 turbo
Engine code	M266.920	M266.940	M266.960	M266.980
Capacity	1498 cc	1699 cc	2034 cc	2034 cc
Valvetrain	8-valve SOHC	8-valve SOHC	8-valve SOHC	8-valve SOHC
Head	Aluminium alloy	Aluminium alloy	Aluminium alloy	Aluminium alloy
Block	Aluminium alloy	Aluminium alloy	Aluminium alloy	Aluminium alloy
Bore × stroke	83 mm × 69.2 mm (3.27 in × 2.72 in)	83 mm × 78.5 mm (3.27 in × 3.09 in)	83 mm × 94 mm (3.3 in × 3.7 in)	83 mm × 94 mm (3.3 in × 3.7 in)
Power	70 kW (95 PS; 94 hp)	85 kW (116 PS; 114 hp)	100 kW (140 PS; 130 hp)	142 kW (193 PS; 190 hp) @ 5,000 rpm
Torque				280 N⋅m (210 lb⋅ft) @ 1800-4850 rpm
Induction	Naturally aspirated	Naturally aspirated	Naturally aspirated	Turbocharged

== See also ==
- List of Mercedes-Benz engines
