= Mercedes-Benz OM640 engine =

Overview
- Manufacturer: Daimler AG (Mercedes-Benz)
- Production: 2004-2012

Layout
- Configuration: Inline-four engine
- Displacement: 1,991 cc (121.5 cu in)
- Cylinder bore: 83 mm (3.3 in)
- Piston stroke: 92 mm (3.6 in)
- Valvetrain: DOHC, 4 valves per cylinder
- Compression ratio: 18:1

Combustion
- Turbocharger: Single with intercooler
- Fuel system: Common rail
- Fuel type: Diesel

Output
- Power output: 60–103 kW (82–140 PS; 80–138 hp)

Chronology
- Predecessor: Mercedes-Benz OM668

The Mercedes-Benz OM640 is a 2.0-liter inline-four diesel engine manufactured by the Mercedes-Benz division of Daimler AG.

== Other applications ==
The OM640 is the basis for the Thielert Centurion 2.0 aircraft engine.

Also used as the basis for the Austro Engine AE-300/330 aircraft engine in Diamond DA-42 and DA-62 aircraft.

== See also ==
- List of Mercedes-Benz engines
