= Mercedes-Benz Vaneo =

Mercedes-Benz Vaneo (W414)
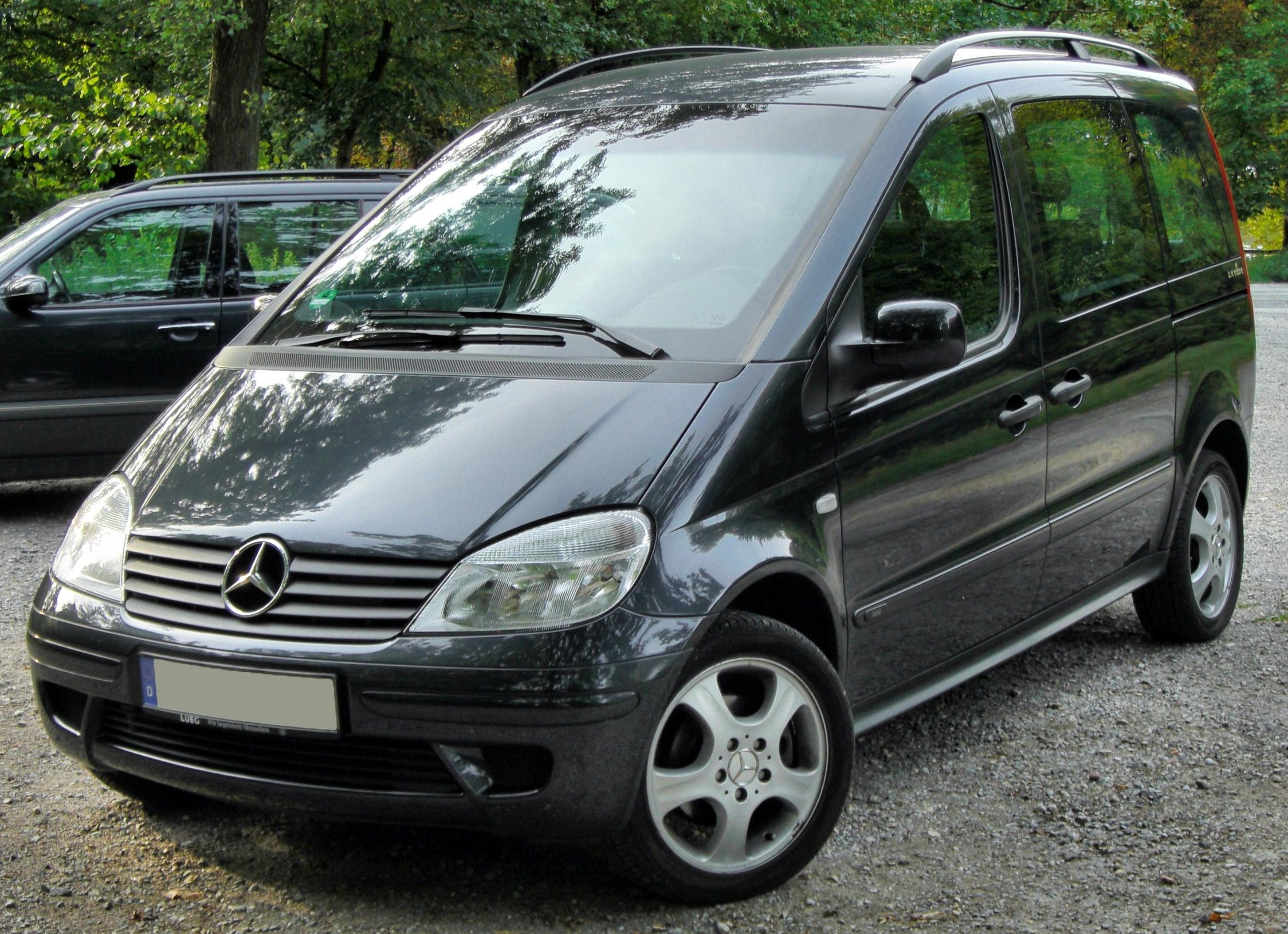

Overview
- Manufacturer: DaimlerChrysler
- Production: 2001–2005
- Assembly: Germany: Ludwigsfelde (Industriewerke Ludwigsfelde)

Body and chassis
- Class: Subcompact MPV (M)
- Body style: 5-door MPV
- Layout: FF layout
- Related: Mercedes-Benz A-Class (W168)

Powertrain
- Engine: 1.6 L L4 Petrol; 1.9 L L4 Petrol; 1.7 L L4 Diesel
- Transmission: 5-speed Manual; 5-speed ACS; 5-speed TouchShift

Dimensions
- Wheelbase: 2,900 mm (114 in)
- Length: 4,192 mm (165 in)
- Width: 1,742 mm (69 in)
- Height: 1,830 mm (72 in)

Chronology
- Successor: Mercedes-Benz B-Class

The Mercedes-Benz Vaneo is a five-door, seven-seater compact MPV (M-segment in Europe) that was produced by Mercedes-Benz from 2001 to 2005. It used the automobile platform from the first generation Mercedes-Benz A-Class. Up to seven seater capacity was available, but this vehicle was not built as a van, instead it was built as a MPV. The name Vaneo is derived from the word Van, which is used in German for the car types MPV.

== Design ==
Mercedes-Benz Vaneo rear

The Vaneo was front-wheel-drive only and limited to four-cylinder engines. The body consisted of two sliding rear doors and a 'Sandwich Floor' construction giving it a van-like driving position and a higher roof line. It was suitable for the U.K.'s Motability scheme for the disabled, as well as for use as taxicabs.

Seating for five was standard, with two third-row buckets optional. With all the rear seats removed, there was up to 3,000 litres of cargo space. A 120 kg capacity slide-out boot floor was optional. Roof rails were standard on Trend and Ambiente models, while ISOfix anchorages were included on all vehicles.

Due to quality issues and poor sales the Vaneo was discontinued after a three-year production run. It was replaced in the same year it was discontinued, by the similarly-sized B-Class.

== Safety ==
The Vaneo was tested by Euro NCAP in 2002 with the following ratings:

Euro NCAP	Rating
Adult occupant:	4/5 stars
Pedestrian:	2/4 stars

== Security ==
The Vaneo was tested by Thatcham's New Vehicle Security Ratings (NVSR) organisation and achieved the following ratings:

NVSR	Rating
Theft of car:	4/5 stars
Theft from car:	2/5 stars

== Powertrains ==
Engines complied with Euro 3 emission standards. They included: 1.6 L in two states of tune and 1.9 L petrol engines, as well as a 1.7 L diesel. Three 5-speed transmissions were available: a manual, an automated clutch system called ACS, and a regular automatic called "TouchShift."

Years	Model & Transmission	Engine	Power	Torque	Top Speed	0–100 km/h (0–62 mph)	Economy	Emissions
Petrol
2002–2005	1.6 82 Manual/ACS	1.6 L, 4 in-L	82 PS (60 kW; 81 hp)	140 N⋅m (103 lb⋅ft)	156 km/h (97 mph)	15.3 secs	36.2 mpg	187 g/km
2002–2005	1.6 102 Manual/ACS	1.6 L, 4 in-L	102 PS (75 kW; 101 hp)	150 N⋅m (111 lb⋅ft)	167 km/h (104 mph)	13.1 secs	35.3 mpg	192 g/km
2002–2005	1.6 102 TouchShift	1.6 L, 4 in-L	102 PS (75 kW; 101 hp)	150 N⋅m (111 lb⋅ft)	164 km/h (102 mph)	13.8 secs	34.0 mpg	199 g/km
2002–2005	1.9 125 Manual/ACS	1.9 L, 4 in-L	125 PS (92 kW; 123 hp)	180 N⋅m (133 lb⋅ft)	182 km/h (113 mph)	10.7 secs	34.4 mpg	197 g/km
2002–2005	1.9 125 TouchShift	1.9 L, 4 in-L	125 PS (92 kW; 123 hp)	180 N⋅m (133 lb⋅ft)	177 km/h (110 mph)	11.5 secs	33.2 mpg	204 g/km
Diesel
2002–2005	1.7 CDI 91 Manual/ACS	1.7 L, 4 in-L	91 PS (67 kW; 90 hp)	180 N⋅m (133 lb⋅ft)	161 km/h (100 mph)	13.6 secs	47.9 mpg	157 g/km
2002–2005	1.7 CDI 91 TouchShift	1.7 L, 4 in-L	91 PS (67 kW; 90 hp)	180 N⋅m (133 lb⋅ft)	158 km/h (98 mph)	15.5 secs	42.8 mpg	174 g/km

== Reviews ==
- Parker's Car Guides
  'Pros: Interior space, usefully practical, easy to drive in town
  Cons: Rattly trim, ungainly styling, firm ride'
- RAC (6.4/10)
  'Don't let the uninspiring looks and twee name put you off. The Vaneo is well built and offers a surprising amount of space in its compact footprint. It won't win any beauty contests and inviting people for 'a spin in the Merc' might be a recipe for disappointment, but to know a Vaneo is to love one. Surprisingly good.'
