= Citroën =

French car brand of Stellantis

- Logo since 2022
- Product type: Automobiles; Commercial vehicles
- Current owner: Stellantis (since 2021)
- Produced by: Stellantis France
- Country: France
- Introduced: 4 June 1919; 107 years ago
- Related brands: DS Automobiles
- Markets: Worldwide (except United States, Canada, Mexico, South Korea, Thailand, Laos, Cambodia, Myanmar, Pakistan, Bangladesh, Russia and Australia)
- Previous owners: PSA Peugeot Citroën (1976–1979; 1986–2016); PSA Peugeot Talbot Citroën (1979–1986); PSA Group (2016–2021)
- Ambassador: Xavier Chardon (CEO of Citroën brand)
- Website: www.citroen.com

Automobiles Citroën
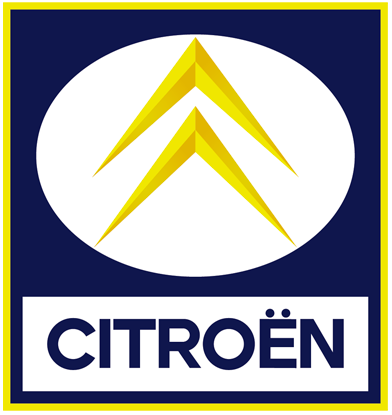
- Final logo used between 1959 and its 1976 merger with Peugeot
- Industry: Automotive
- Founded: 4 June 1919; 107 years ago
- Founder: André Citroën
- Defunct: 9 April 1976
- Fate: Merged with Peugeot to form PSA Group in 1976
- Successor: PSA Group
- Headquarters: Paris, France

Citroën (French: [sitʁɔɛn]) (Note: The double-dot diacritic over the 'e' is a diaeresis (French: tréma) indicating the two vowels are sounded separately, and not as a diphthong.) is a French automobile brand owned by Stellantis since 2021. The Automobiles Citroën manufacturing company was founded on 4 June 1919 by André Citroën. Peugeot acquired 89.95% share in Citroën in 1976, leading to the formation of PSA Peugeot Citroën, then known as PSA Group. Citroën's head office is located in the Stellantis Poissy Plant in Saint-Ouen-sur-Seine since 2021 (previously in Rueil-Malmaison) and its offices studies and research in Vélizy-Villacoublay, Poissy (CEMR), Carrières-sous-Poissy and Sochaux-Montbéliard.

In 1934, the firm established its reputation for innovative technology with the Traction Avant. This was the world's first car to be mass-produced with front-wheel drive and four-wheel independent suspension, as well as unibody construction, omitting a separate chassis, and instead using the body of the car itself as its main load-bearing structure.

In 1954, Citroën produced the world's first hydropneumatic self-levelling suspension system; then the revolutionary DS, the first mass-produced car with modern disc brakes, in 1955. In 1967, swiveling headlights that allowed for greater visibility on winding roads were introduced in several models. These cars have received various national and international awards, including three European Car of the Year awards.

== History ==
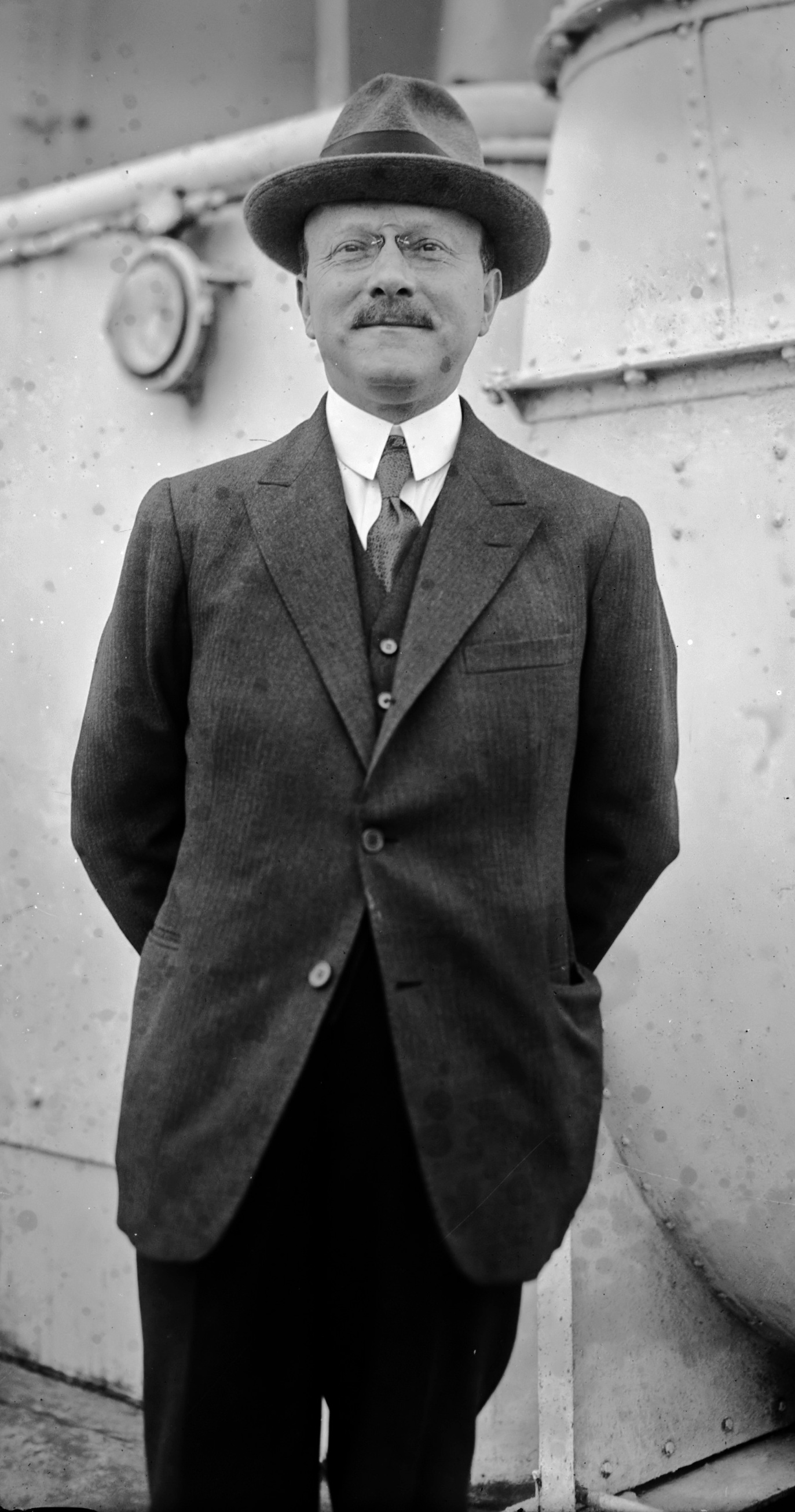
André Citroën

André Citroën graduated from the École Polytechnique in 1900 and visited his mother's homeland, Poland, shortly after she died. During that holiday, he saw a carpenter working on a set of gears with a fishbone structure that were less noisy and more efficient. Citroën bought the patent for very little money, leading to the invention of double helical gears. The next year, he and his partners invested a significant portion of his inheritance in founding "Citroën, Hinstin et Cie," a gear manufacturing business specializing in V-shaped helical gears, starting with about ten workers.

Citroën had a successful six-year stint working with Mors between 1908 and the outbreak of World War I. He built armaments for France during the war, but he realized that unless he planned ahead, he would have a modern factory without a product afterward.

=== Early years ===
Citroën began planning to switch to automobile manufacturing by 1916, when he asked the engineer Louis Dufresne, previously with Mors rival Panhard, to design a technically sophisticated 18-horsepower automobile he could produce in his factory once peace returned. Long before that happened, however, he had modified his vision and decided, like Henry Ford, that the best post-war opportunities in auto-making would involve a lighter car of good quality, but made in sufficient quantities to be priced enticingly. In February 1917, Citroën contacted the 1909 creator of Le Zèbre, French automotive engineer Jules Salomon, with a mandate that was characteristically both demanding and simple: produce an all-new design for a 10-horsepower car that would be better equipped, more robust, and less costly to produce than any rival product at the time.

The result was the Citroën Type A, announced to the press in March 1919, just four months after the guns fell silent. The first production Type A emerged from the factory—located at Quai de Javel, Vaugirard, Paris—at the end of May 1919, and in June it was exhibited at a showroom at Number 42, on the Champs-Élysées in Paris which normally sold Alda cars. Citroën persuaded the owner of the Alda business, Fernand Charron, to lend him the showroom, which is still in use today. This C42 showroom is where the company organises exhibitions and shows its vehicles and concept cars. A few years later, Charron would be persuaded to become a major investor in the Citroën business. On 7 July 1919, the first customer took delivery of a new 10HP Type A. In the same year, it produced 30 cars daily, totaling 2,810 vehicles, with 12,244 produced in 1920.

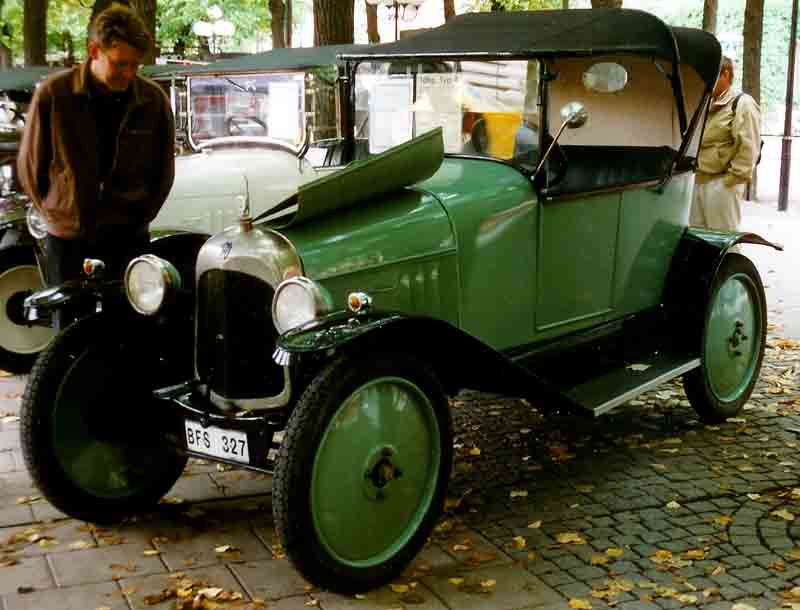
1919 Citroën A 8CV Torpedo

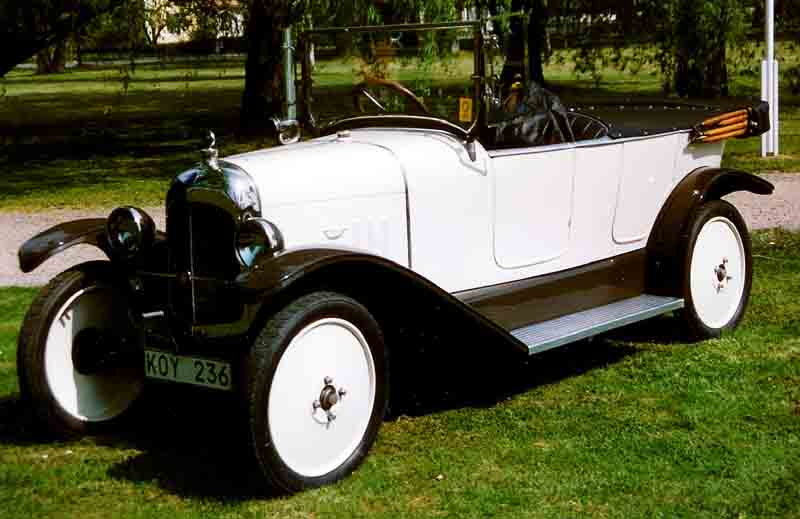
1921 Citroën B Torpedo

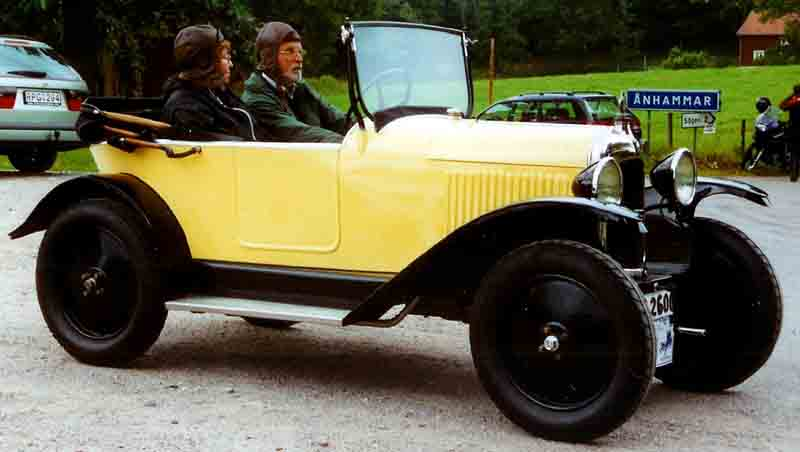
1923 Type C 5CV

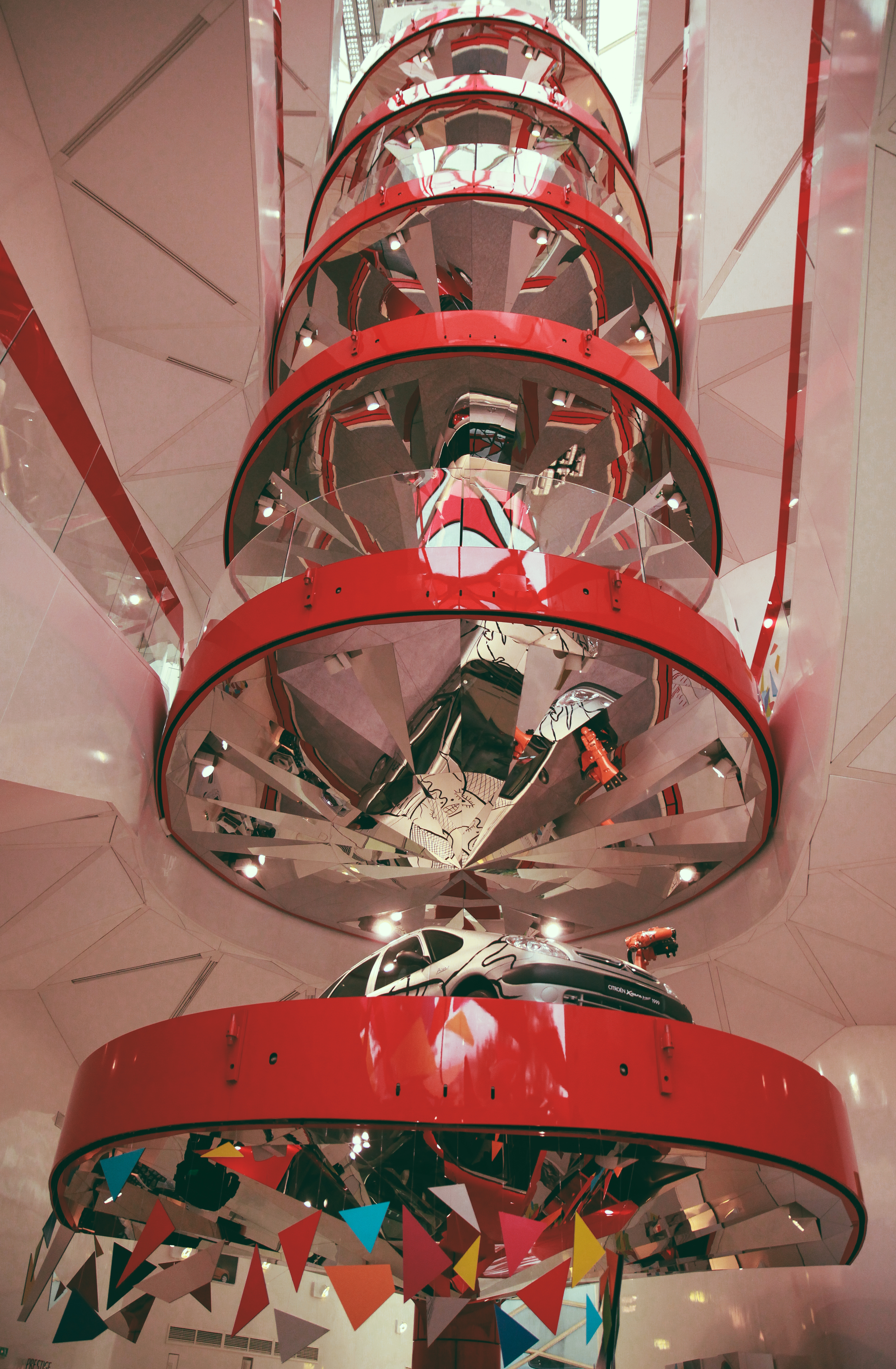
C 42 is the Citroën showroom on the Champs Elysées in Paris

That same year, André Citroën briefly negotiated with General Motors a proposed sale of the Citroën company. The deal nearly closed, but General Motors ultimately decided that its management and capital would be too overstretched by the takeover, thus, Citroën remained independent until 1935.

Between 1921 and 1937, Citroën produced half-track vehicles for off-road and military uses, using the Kégresse track system. In the 1920s, the U.S. Army purchased several Citroën-Kégresse vehicles for evaluation followed by a licence to produce them. This resulted in the United States Army Ordnance Department building a prototype in 1939. In December 1942, it went into production with the M2 Half Track Car and M3 Half-track versions. The U.S. eventually produced more than 41,000 vehicles in over 70 versions between 1940 and 1944. After their 1940 occupation of France, the Nazis captured many of the Citroën half-track vehicles and armored them for their own use.

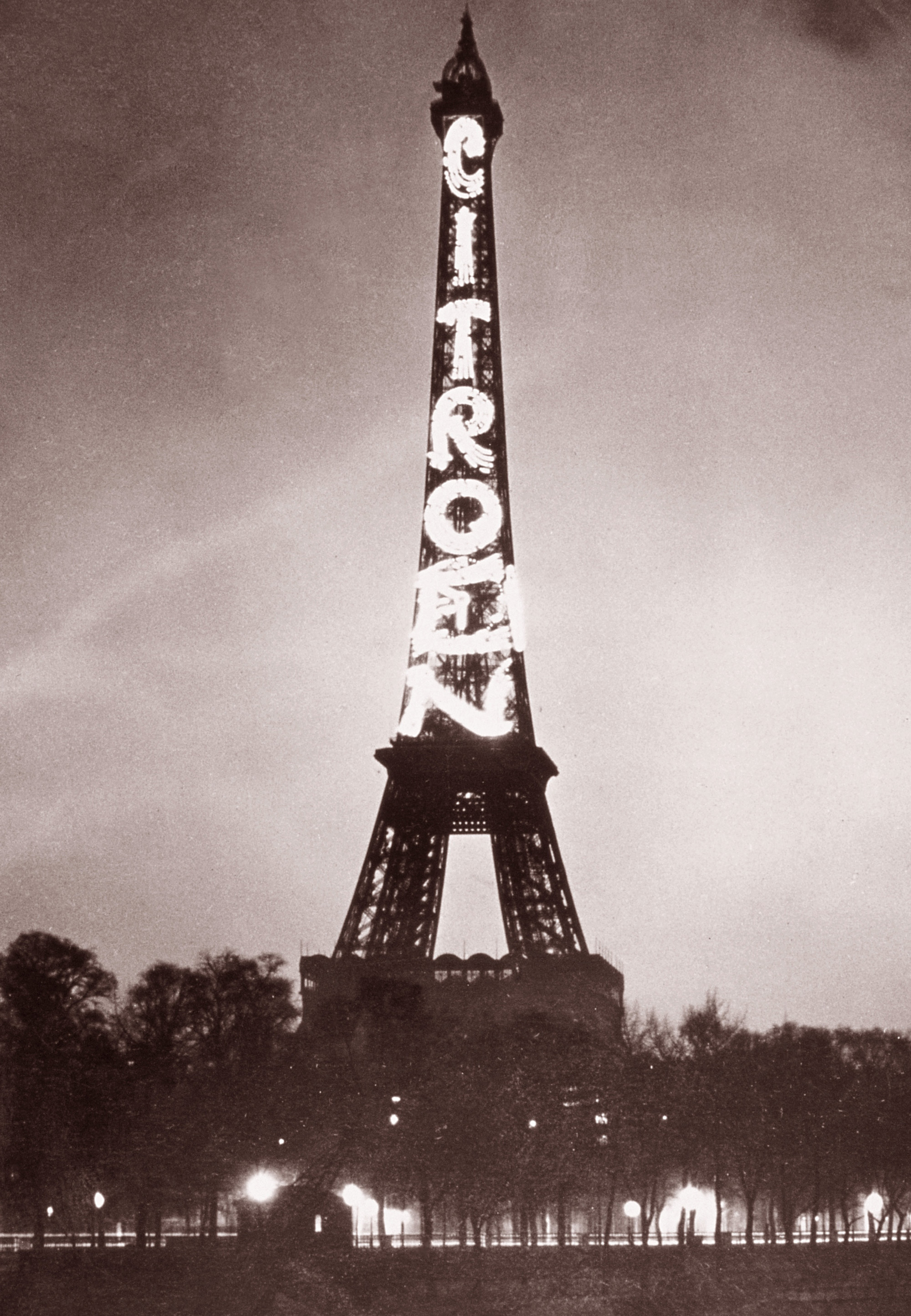
The Eiffel Tower served as a billboard for Citroën from 1925 to 1934.

Citroën used the Eiffel Tower as the world's largest advertising sign, as recorded in Guinness World Records. He also sponsored expeditions across the Sahara and in Asia (Croisière Jaune), North America (Croisière Blanche) and Africa (Croisière Noire), demonstrating the potential for motor vehicles equipped with the Kégresse track system to cross inhospitable regions. These expeditions conveyed scientists and journalists.

Demonstrating extraordinary toughness, a 1923 Citroën that had already travelled 48,000 km (30,000 mi) was the first car to be driven around Australia. The car, a 1923 Citroën 5CV Type C Torpedo, was driven by Neville Westwood from Perth, Western Australia, on a round trip from August to December 1925. This vehicle is now fully restored and in the collection of the National Museum of Australia.

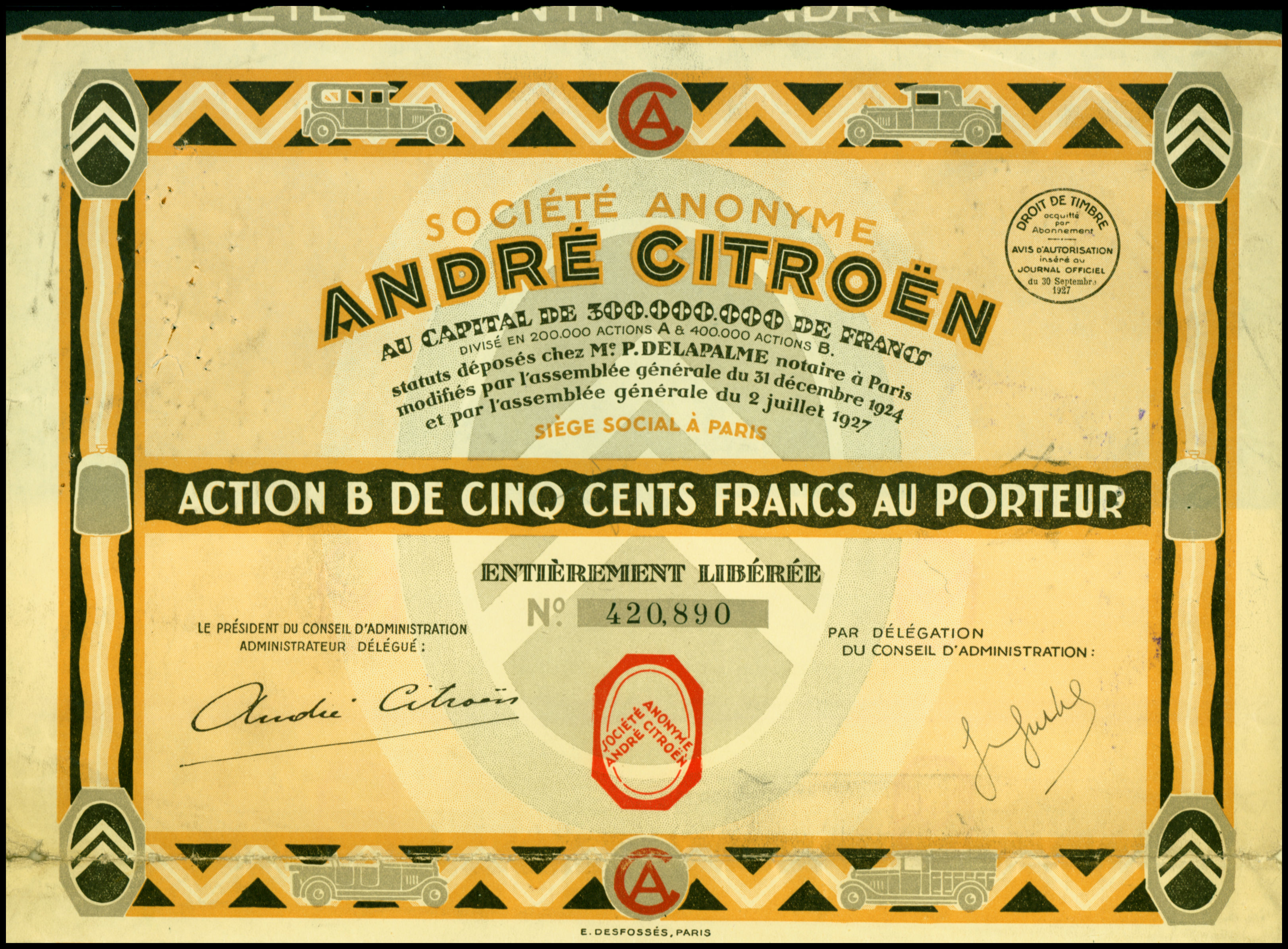
Share of the S. A. André Citroën, issued 30 September 1927

In 1924, Citroën began a business relationship with the American engineer Edward G. Budd. From 1899, Budd had worked to develop stainless steel bodies for railroad cars, for Pullman in particular. Budd went on to manufacture steel bodies for many automakers, Dodge being his first big auto client. At the Paris Motor Show in October 1924, Citroën introduced the Citroën B10, the first all-steel body in Europe. These automobiles were initially successful in the marketplace, but soon competitors who were still using a wooden structure for their vehicles, introduced new body designs. Citroën, who did not redesign the bodies of his cars, still sold in large quantities nonetheless, the cars' low price being the main selling point, which factor however caused Citroën to experience heavy losses.

In 1927, the bank Lazard helped Citroën by bringing new much-needed funds, as well as by renegotiating its debt—for example, by buying out the Société de Vente des Automobiles Citroën (SOVAC). It went even further by entering in its capital and being represented on the board; the three directors sent by Lazard were Raymond Philippe, Andre Meyer and Paul Frantzen. André Citroën perceived the need to differentiate his product, to avoid the low price competition surrounding his conventional rear drive models in the late 1920s and early 1930s. In 1933 he introduced the Rosalie, the first commercially available passenger car with a diesel engine, developed with Harry Ricardo.

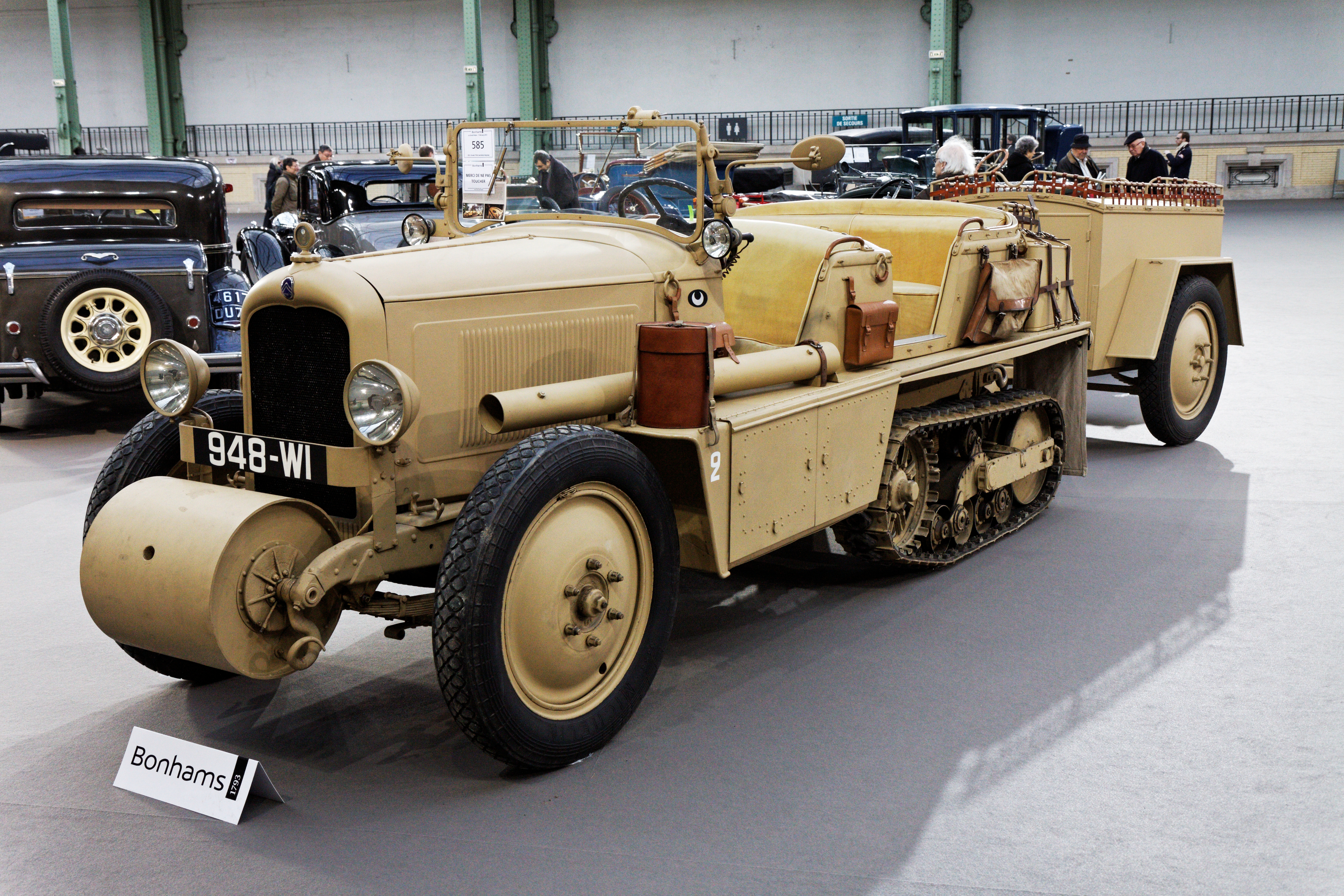
1931 C4 based Citroën P17 C Kégresse track

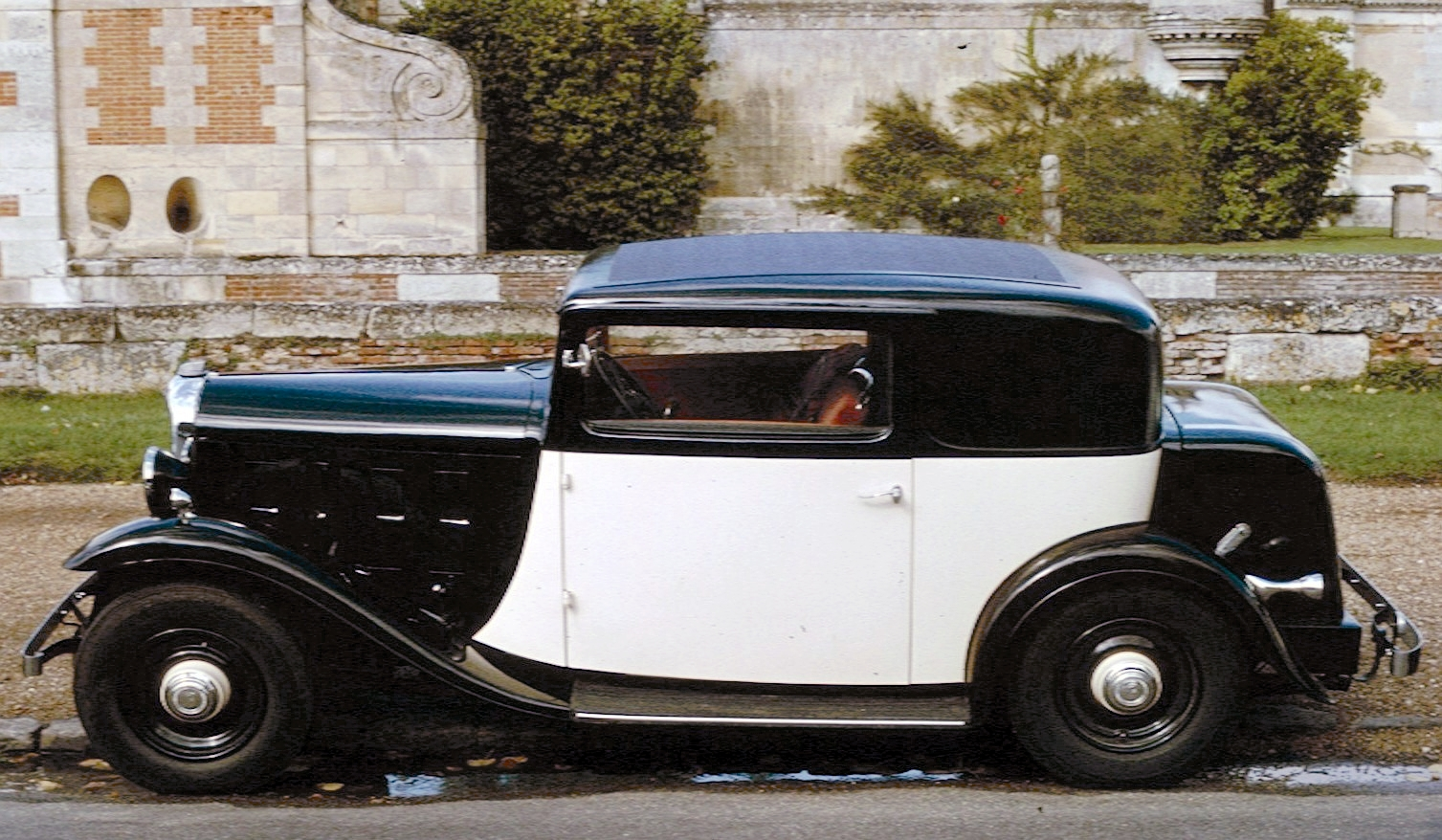
1933 Citroën Rosalie Coupe 15CV

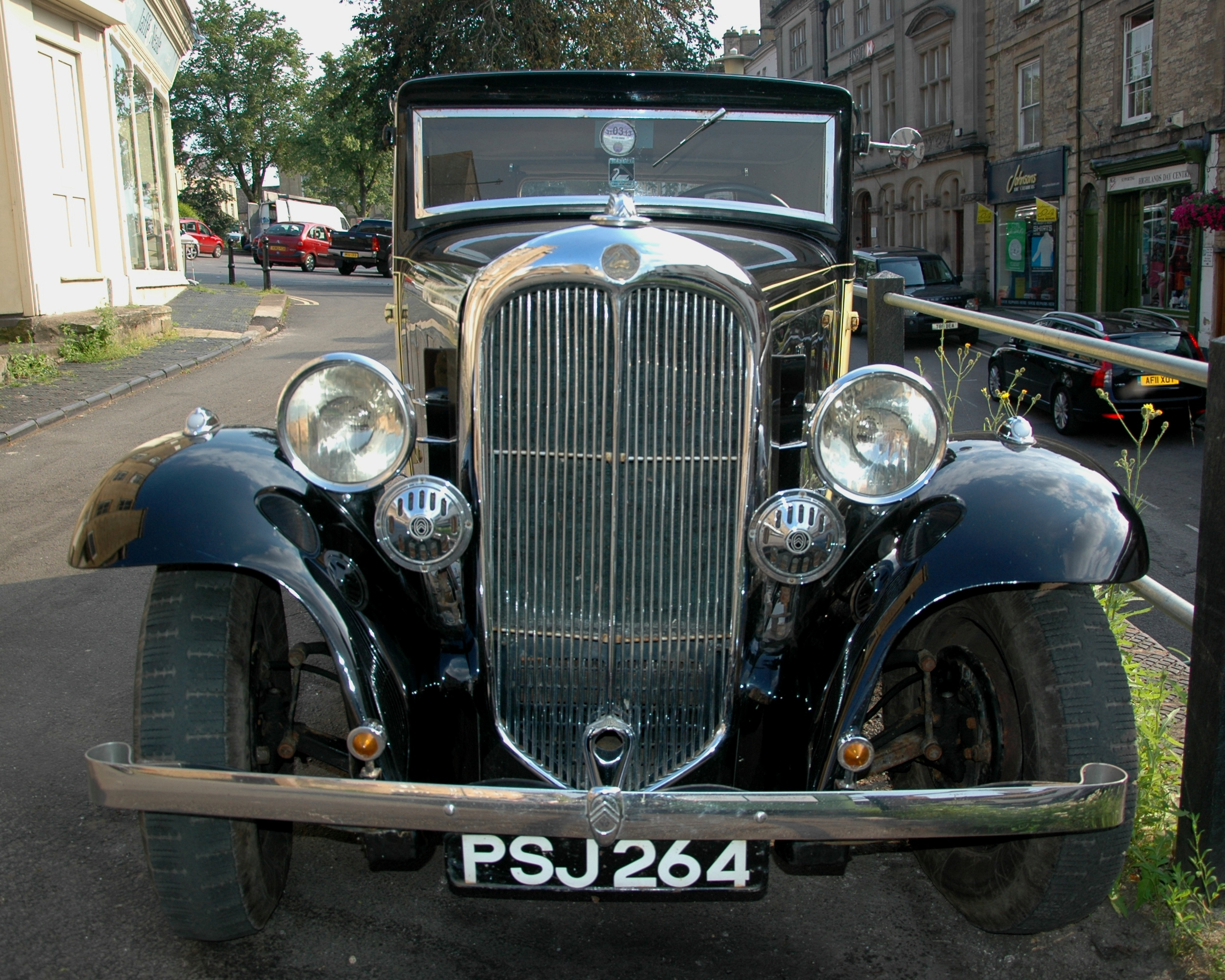
Citroën 8CV

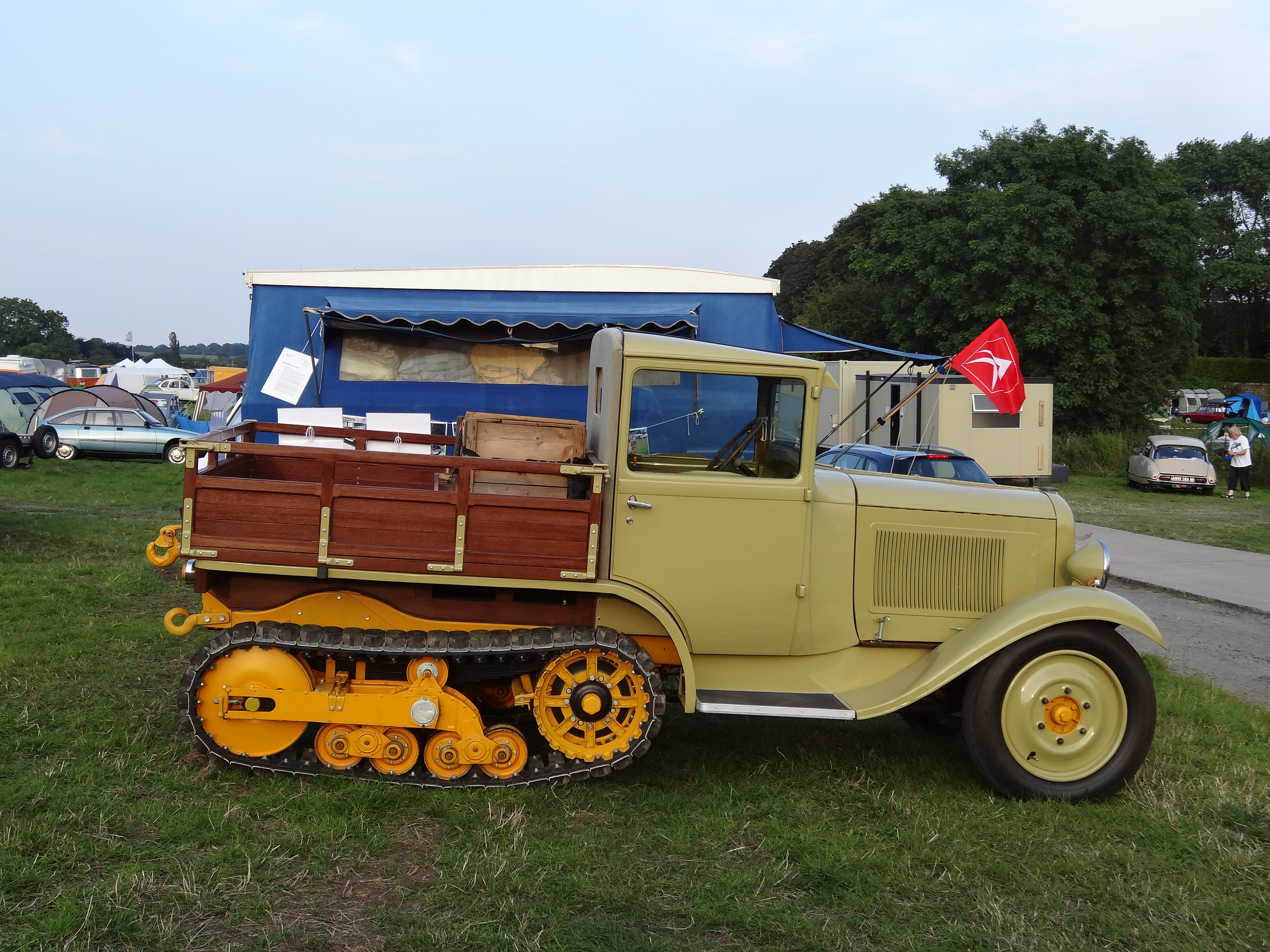
1933 C4 based Citroën P17 C Kégresse track

=== Traction Avant and Michelin ownership ===
==== Traction Avant ====
The Traction Avant is a car that pioneered the mass production of three revolutionary features that are still in use today: a unitary body with no separate frame, four wheel independent suspension and front-wheel drive. Whereas for many decades, the vast majority of motor cars were similar in conception to the Ford Model T – a body bolted onto a ladder frame which held all the mechanical elements of the car, a solid rear axle that rigidly connected the rear wheels and rear wheel drive. The Model T school of automobile engineering proved popular because it was considered cheap to build, although it did pose dynamic defects as automobiles were becoming more capable, and resulted in heavier cars, which is why today cars are more like the Traction Avant than the Model T under the skin. In 1934 Citroën commissioned the American Budd Company to create a prototype, which evolved into the 7 fiscal horsepower (CV), 32 hp (24 kW) Traction Avant.

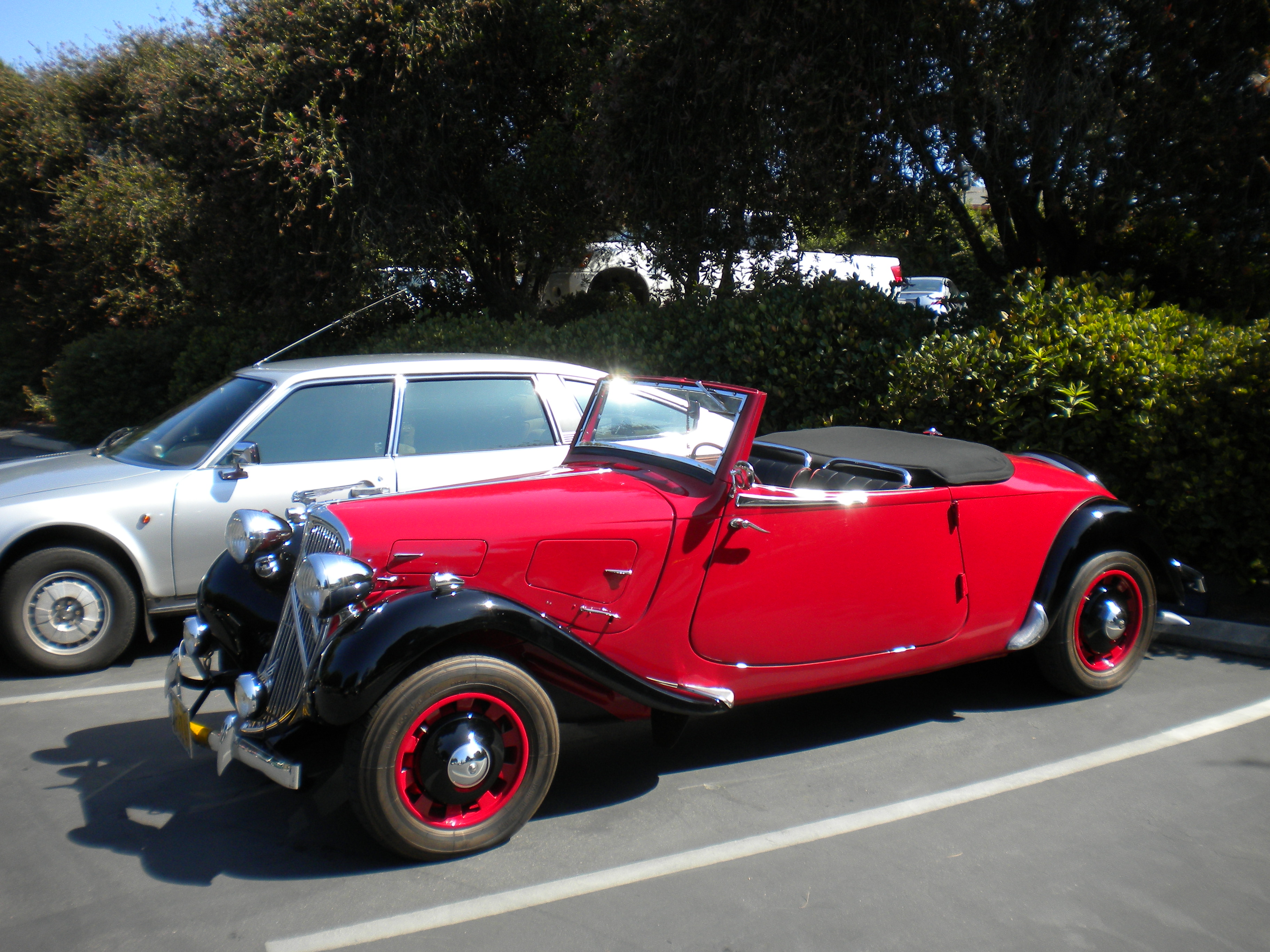
Pre-war Citroën Traction Avant Cabriolet

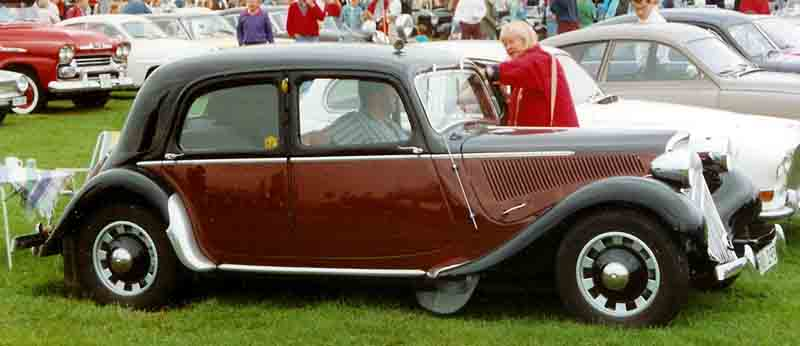
Citroën Traction Avant

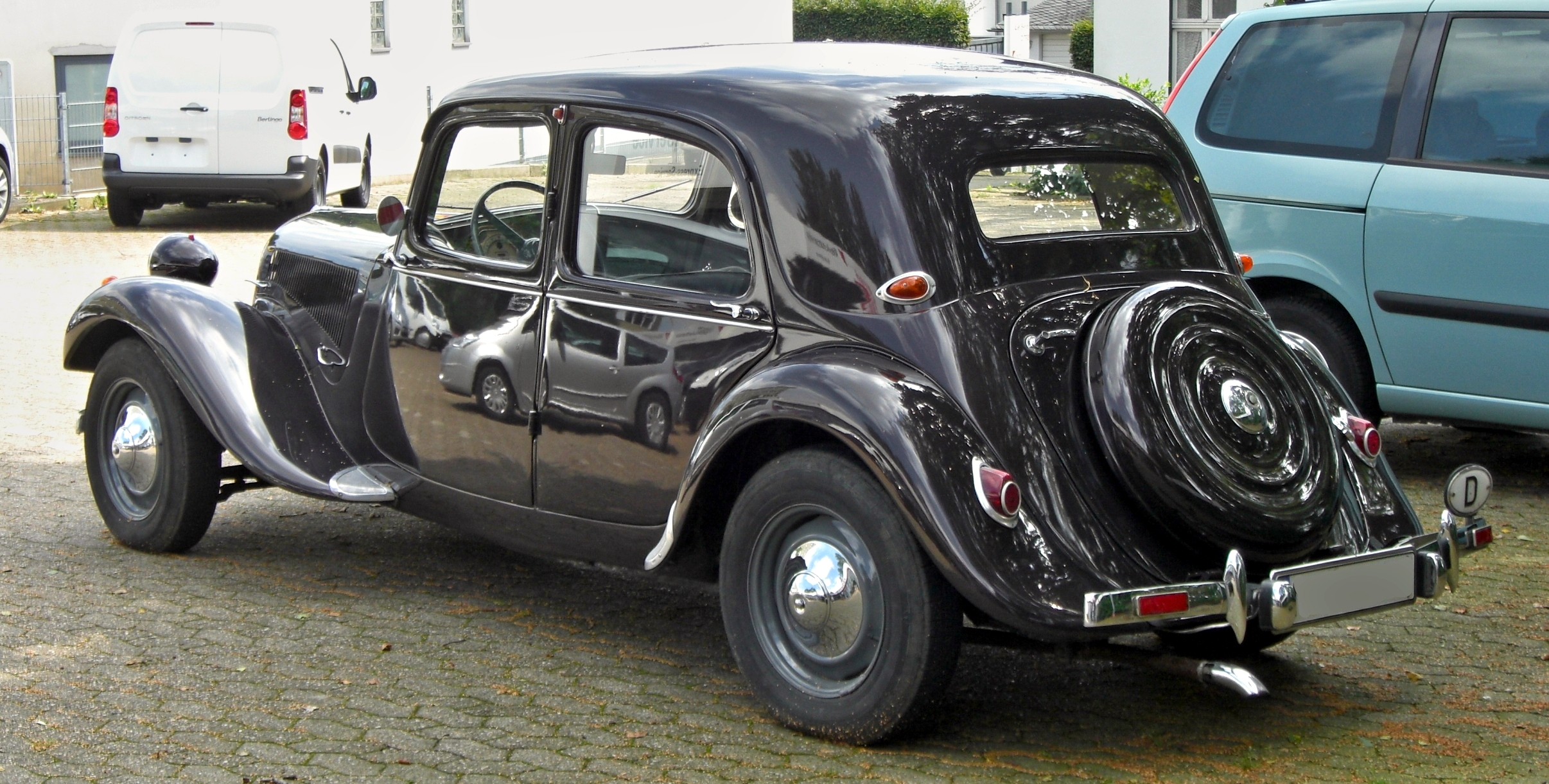
Citroën Traction Avant Légère rear view

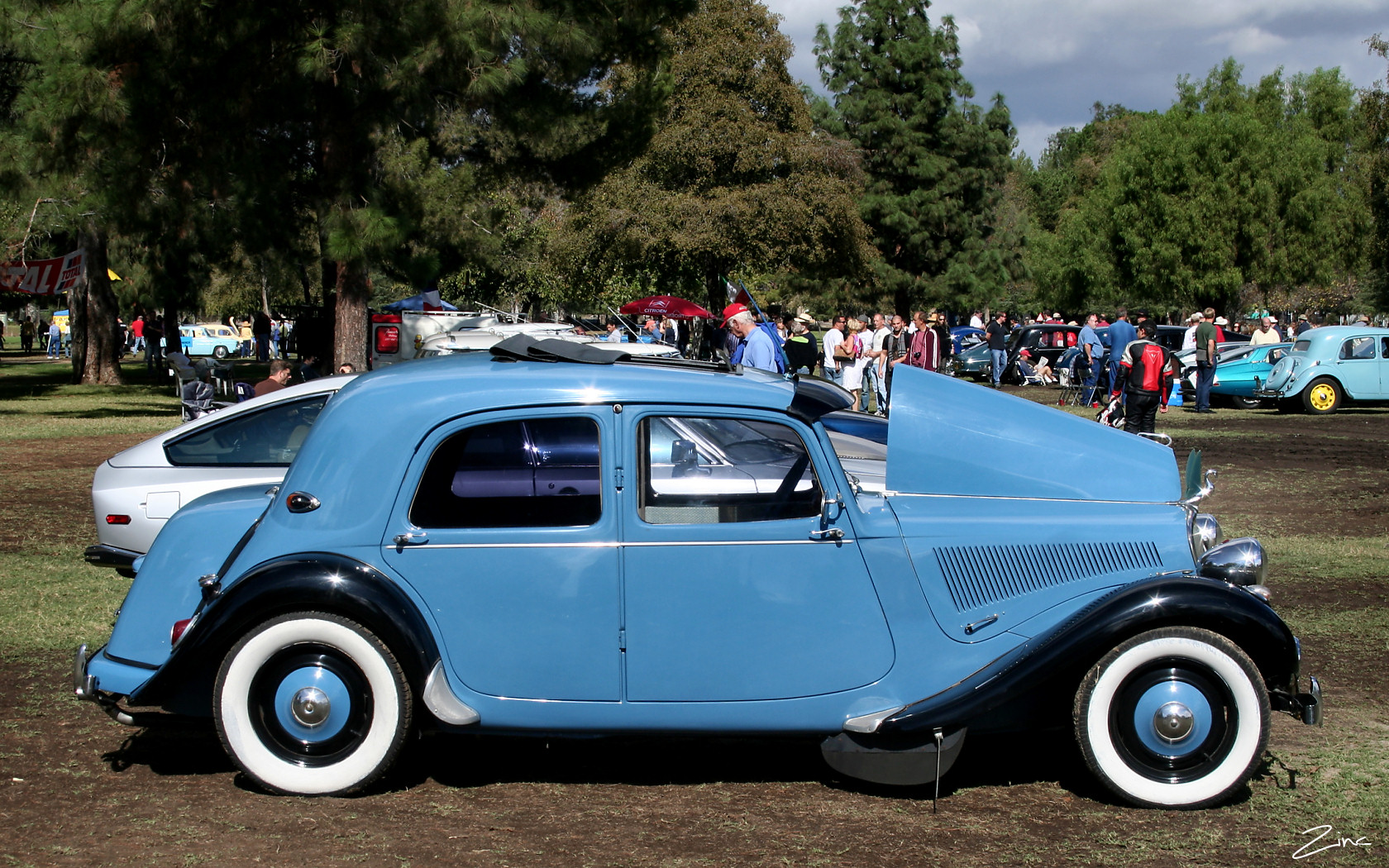
1956 Citroën Traction Avant

Achieving quick development of the Traction Avant, tearing down and rebuilding the factory (in five months) and the extensive marketing efforts, were investments that resulted too costly for Citroën to do all at once, causing the financial ruin of the company. In December 1934, despite the assistance of the Michelin company, Citroën filed for bankruptcy. Within the month, Michelin, already the car manufacturer's largest creditor, became its principal shareholder. However, the technologically advanced Traction Avant had met with market acceptance, and the basic philosophy of cutting-edge technology used as a differentiator, continued until the late 1990s. Pierre Michelin became the chairman of Citroën early in 1935. Pierre-Jules Boulanger, his deputy, became the vice-president and chief of the engineering and design departments. In 1935, the founder André Citroën died from stomach cancer.

==== Research breakthroughs ====
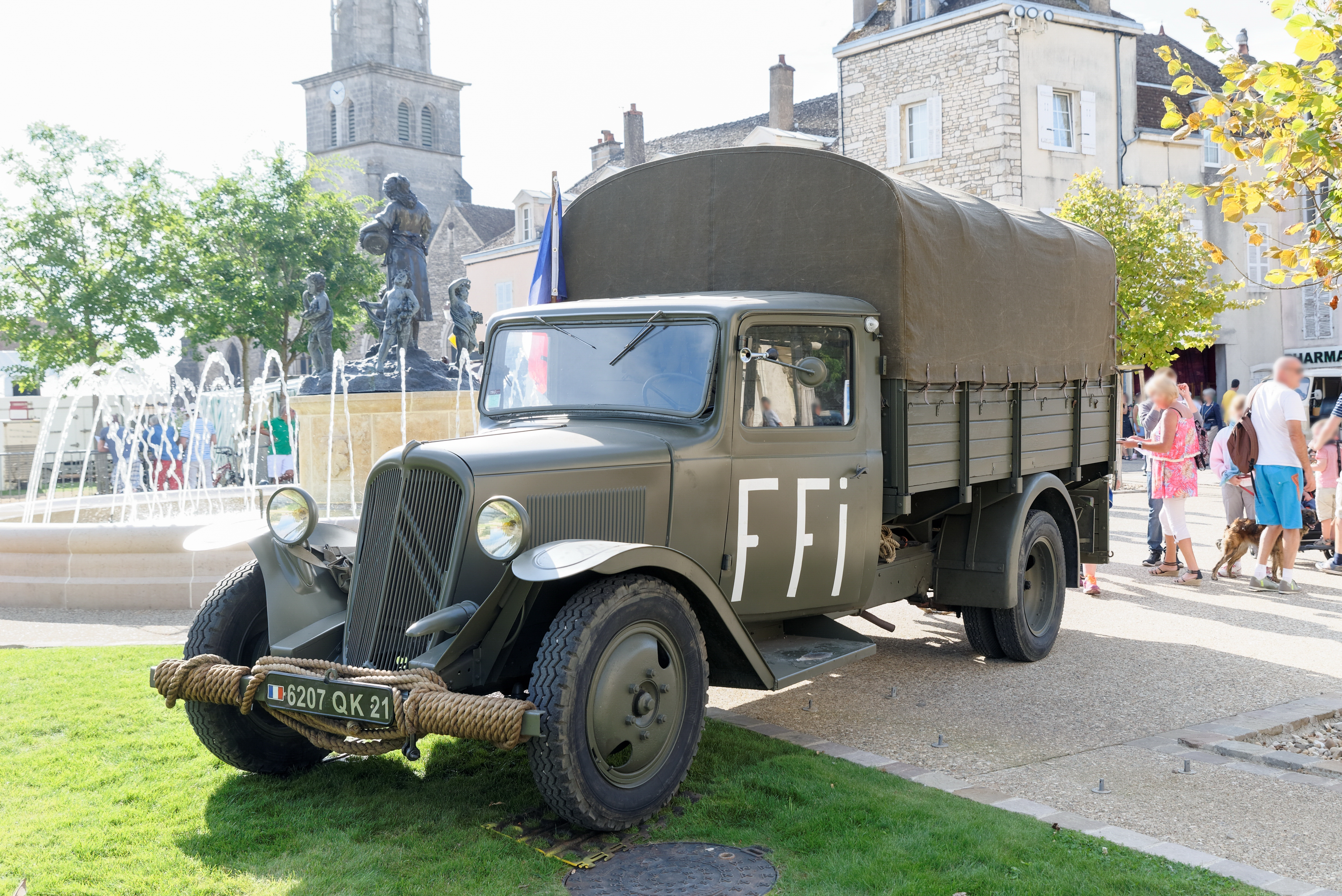
Mid 20th century Citroën military truck

Pierre-Jules Boulanger had been a First World War air reconnaissance photography specialist with the French Air Force; he was capable and efficient and finished the war with the rank of captain. He was also courageous, having been decorated with the Military Cross and the Legion of Honour. He started working for Michelin in 1918, reporting directly to Édouard Michelin, co-director and founder of the business. Boulanger joined the Michelin board in 1922 and became president of Citroën in January 1938 after the death in a road accident of his friend Pierre Michelin remaining in this position until his own death in 1950. In 1938, he also had become Michelin's joint managing director.

During the German occupation of France in World War II Boulanger refused to meet Dr. Ferdinand Porsche or communicate with the German authorities except through intermediaries. He organized a "go slow" on production of trucks for the Wehrmacht, many of which were sabotaged at the factory by putting the notch on the oil dipstick in the wrong place, which resulted in engine seizure. In 1944 when the Gestapo headquarters in Paris was sacked by the French Resistance, his name was prominent on a Nazi blacklist of the most important enemies of the Reich, to be arrested in the event of an allied invasion of France.

Citroën researchers, including Paul Magès, continued their work in secret, against the express orders of the Germans, and developed the concepts that were later brought to market in three remarkable vehicles – a small car (2CV), a delivery van (Type H) and a large, swift family car (DS). These were widely regarded by contemporary journalists as avant garde, even radical, solutions to automotive design. Thus began a decades-long period of unusual brand loyalty, normally seen in the automobile industry only in niche brands, like Porsche and Ferrari.

==== 2CV ====
Citroën unveiled the Citroën 2CV or Deux Chevaux signifying two tax horsepower and initially only 9 hp (6.6 kW), at the Paris Salon in 1948. The car became a bestseller, achieving the designer's aim of providing rural French people with a motorized alternative to the horse. It was unusually inexpensive to purchase and, with its small two cylinder engine, inexpensive to run as well. The 2CV pioneered a very soft, interconnected suspension, but did not have the more complex self-levelling feature. This car remained in production, with only minor changes, until 1990 and was a common sight on French roads until recently; 9 million 2CV variants were produced in the period 1948–1990.

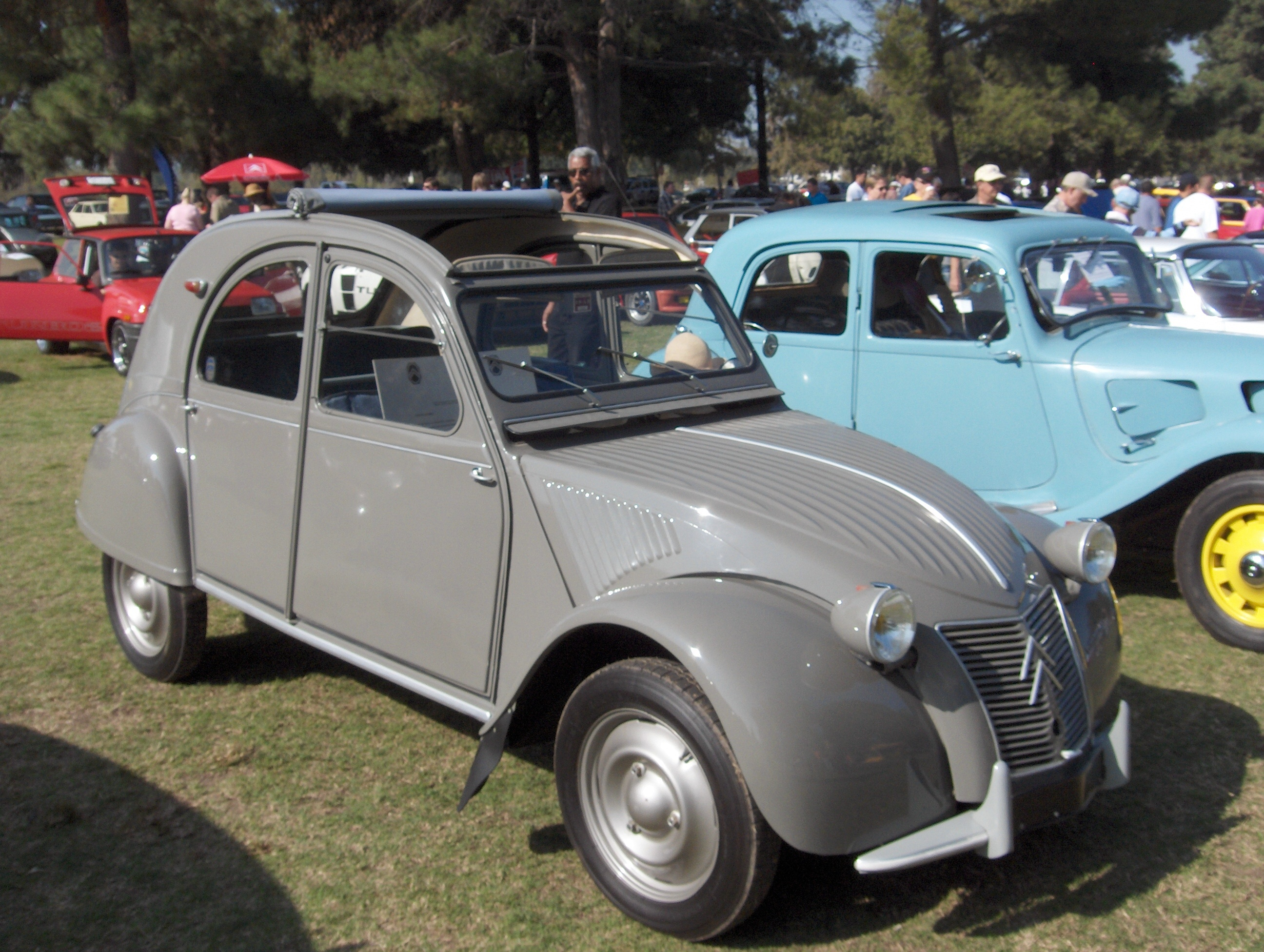
1955 Citroën 2CV

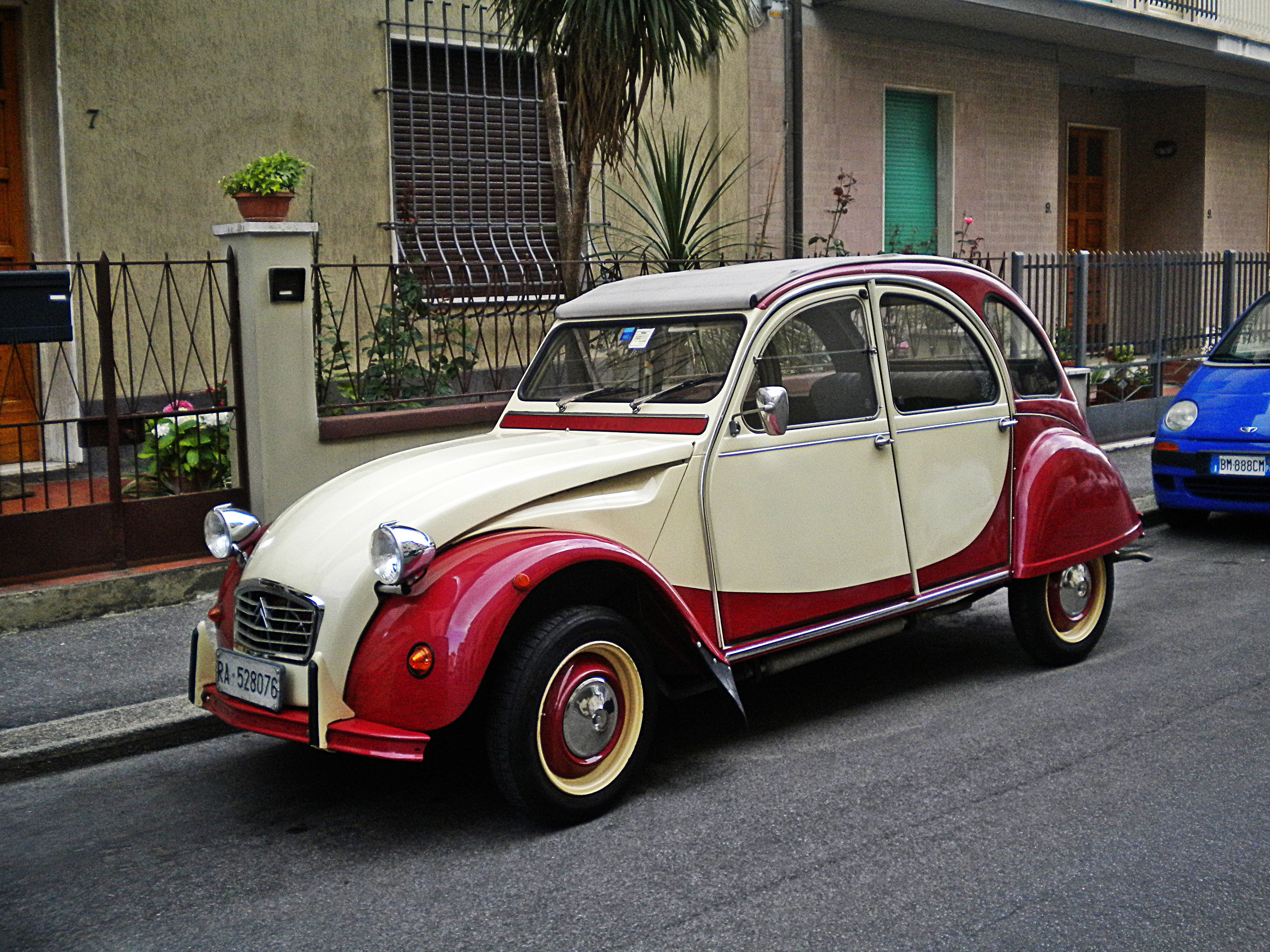
1989 Citroën 2CV, with "Charleston" colours & shapes

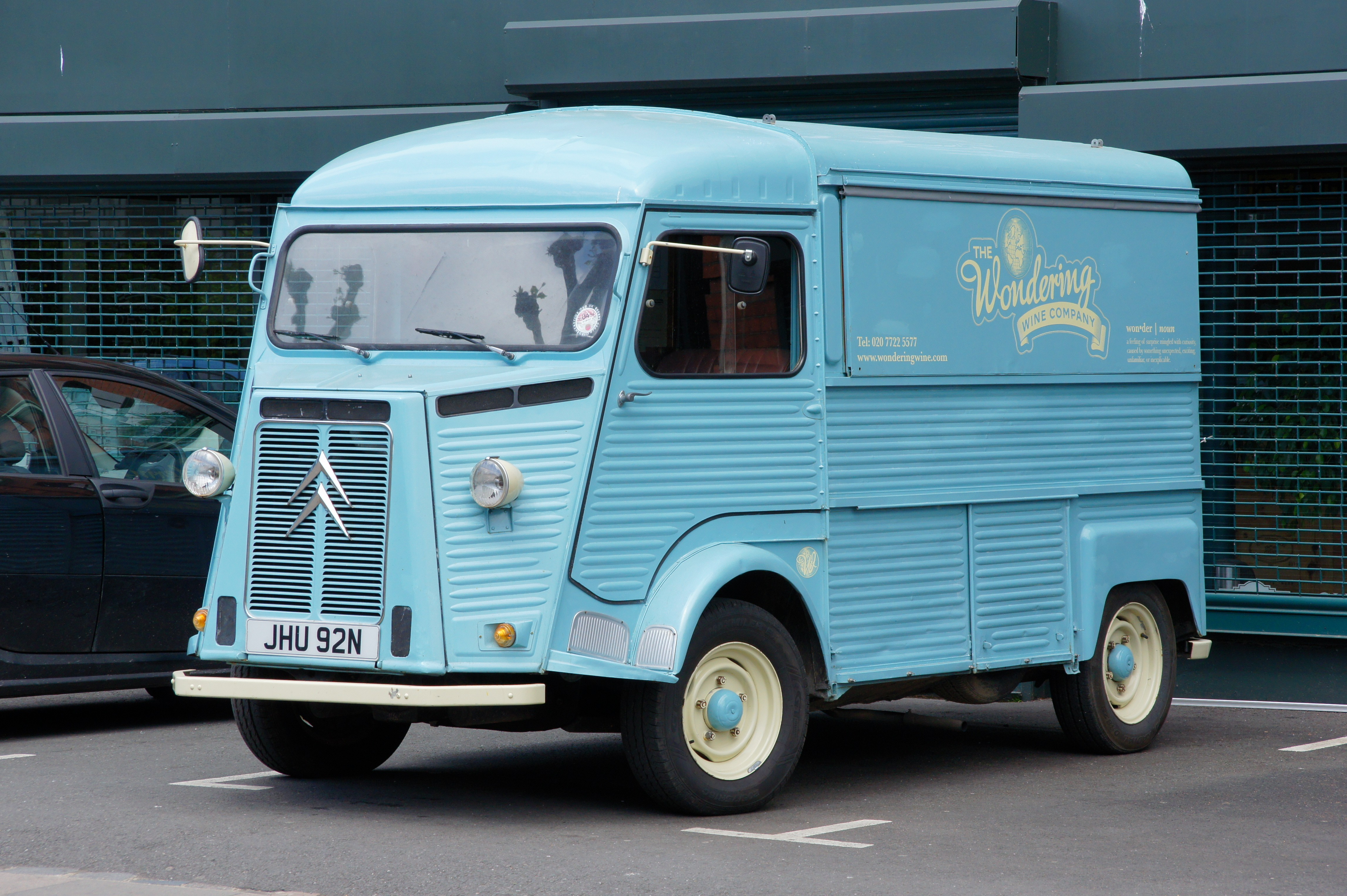
Citroën type H / HY van

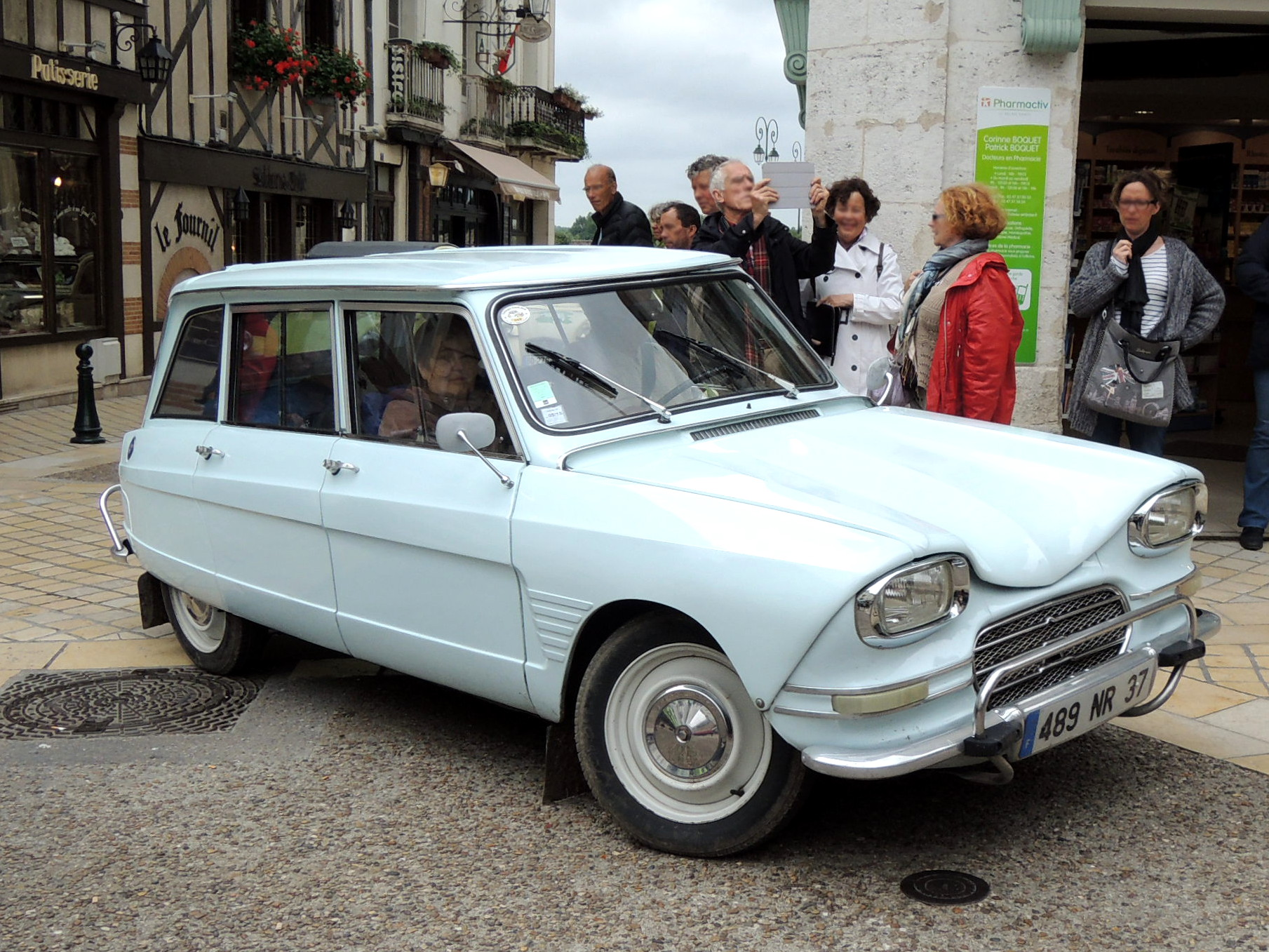
Citroën Ami

==== DS ====
1955 saw the introduction of the DS, the first full usage of Citroën's hydropneumatic self-levelling suspension system, tested on the rear suspension of the Traction in 1954. The DS was also the first production car with modern disc brakes. A single high-pressure hydraulic system was used to actuate the power steering, the suspension and brakes; the brakes were fully powered, not power assisted, as pedal force was not a component of braking power. The gearshift, (semi-automatic transmission) was also powered by the hydraulic system through a control valve, with actuating pistons in the gearbox cover to shift the gears in the transmission, and the clutch was operated automatically by the system, so there was no clutch pedal. From 1957 the ID19 model offered a simplified hydraulic system, with manual steering and conventional manual gearshift, and a significant price reduction. From 1968, with revised front end style, the DS also introduced auxiliary driving lights, that moved directionally with the steering, improving visibility at night. Production from 1956 to 1975 totalled almost 1.5 million cars. The streamlined car was remarkable for its era and had a remarkable sounding name – in French, DS is pronounced [de.ɛs], which sounds the same as déesse, which means Goddess. It placed third in the 1999 Car of the Century competition.

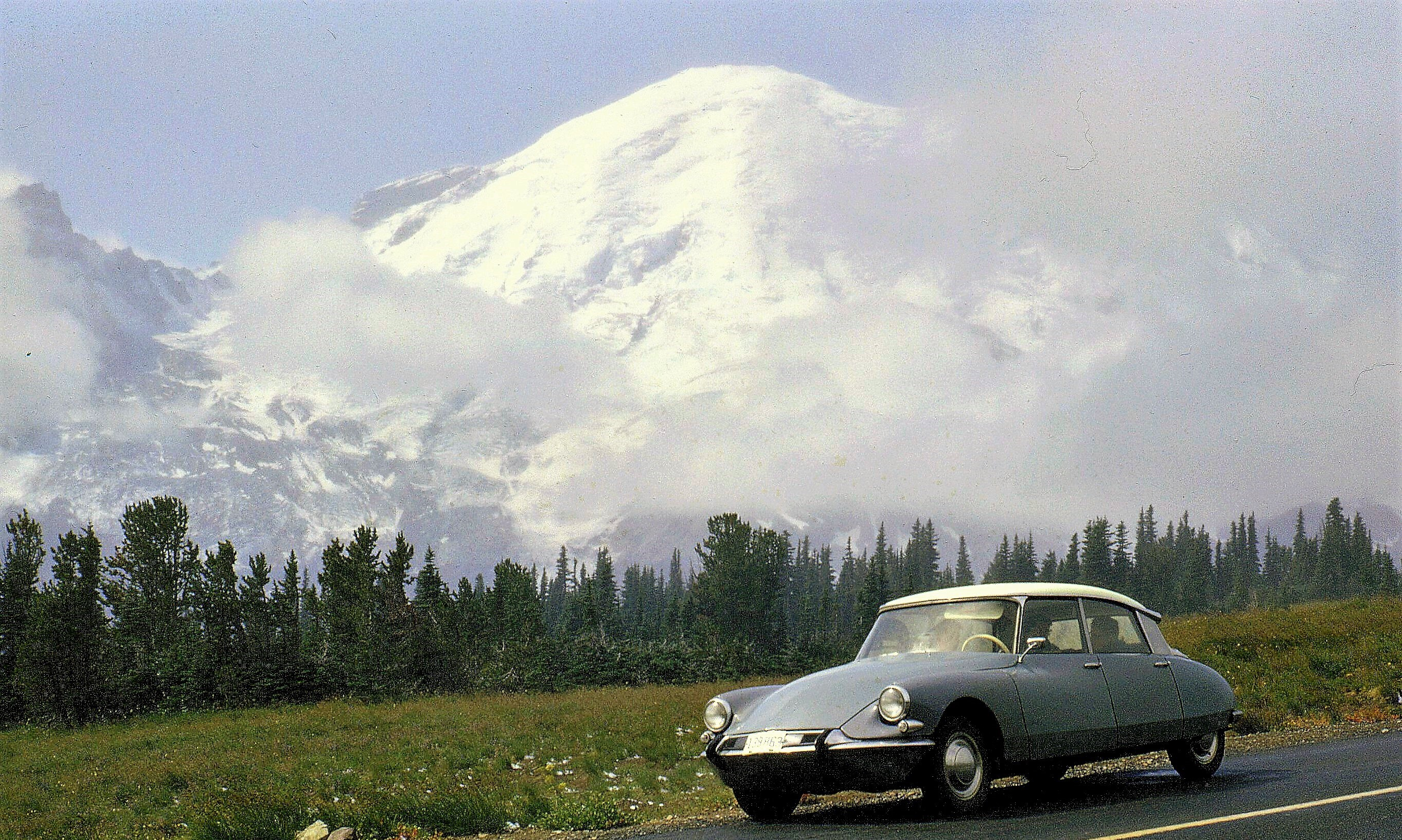
A DS near Mt. Baker circa. 1970

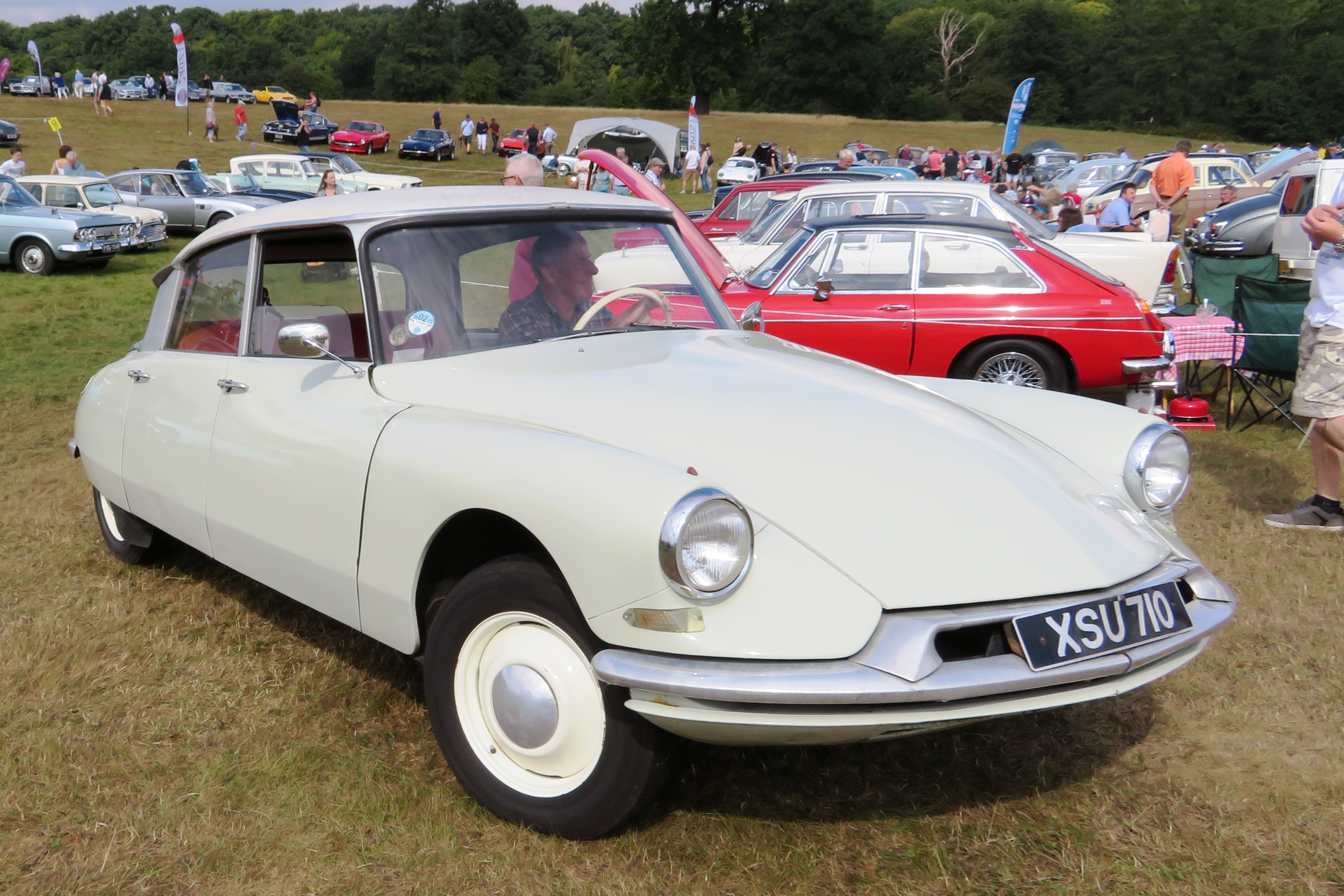
1962 Citroën ID variant of DS

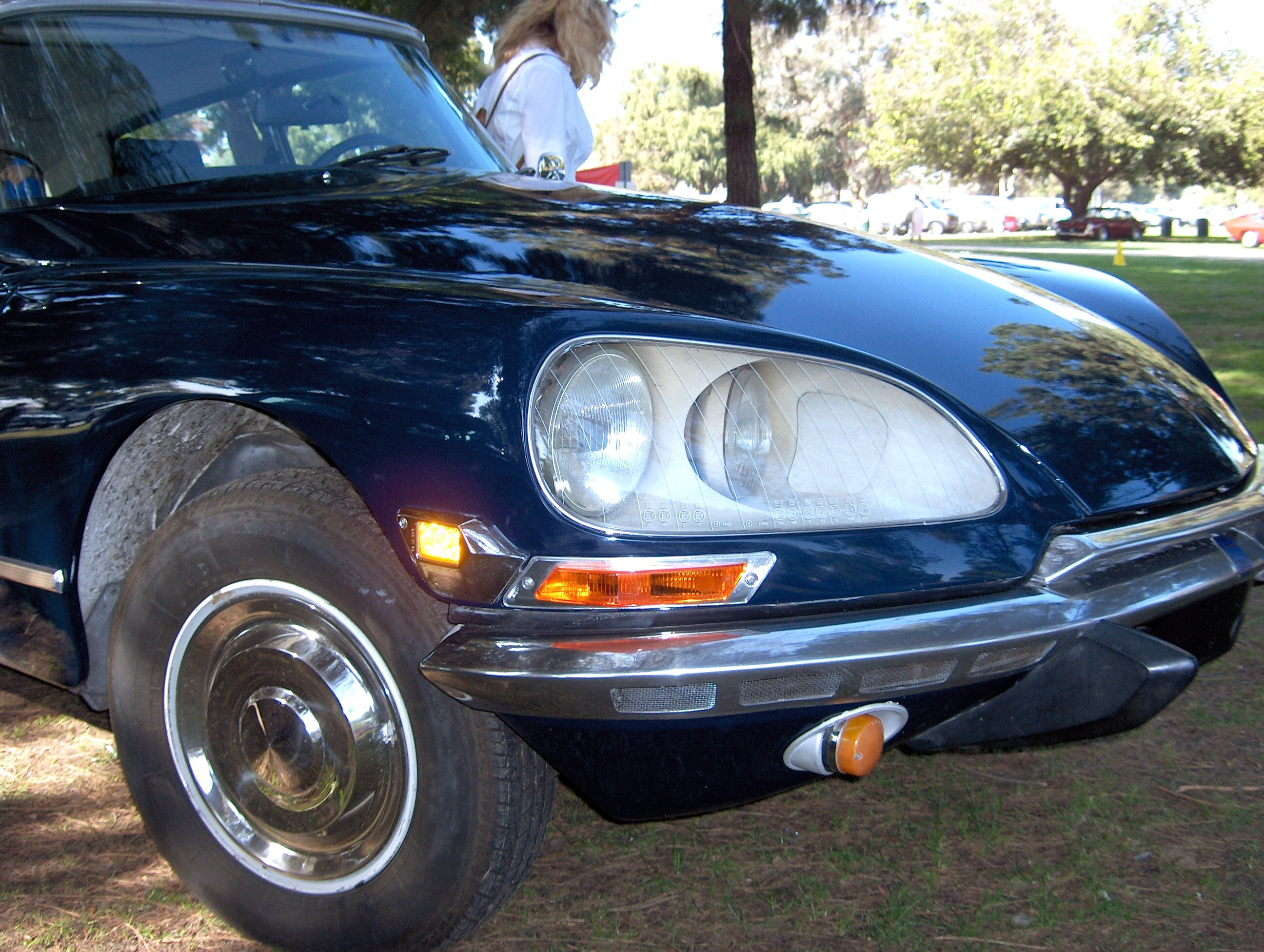
Citroën DS Pallas with directional headlights (1968–1975)

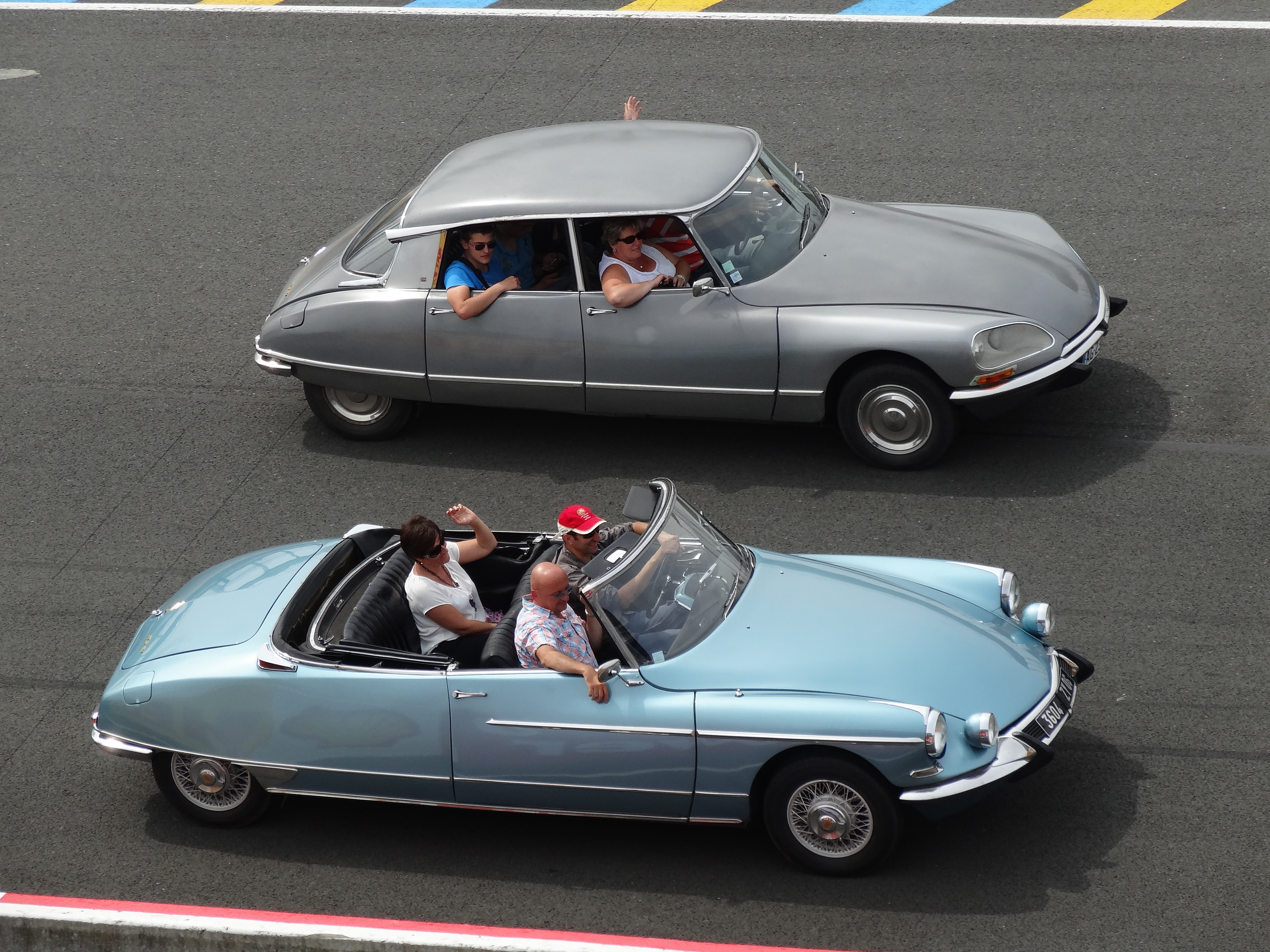
DS Sedan (1955–1975) and Cabriolet (1960–1971)

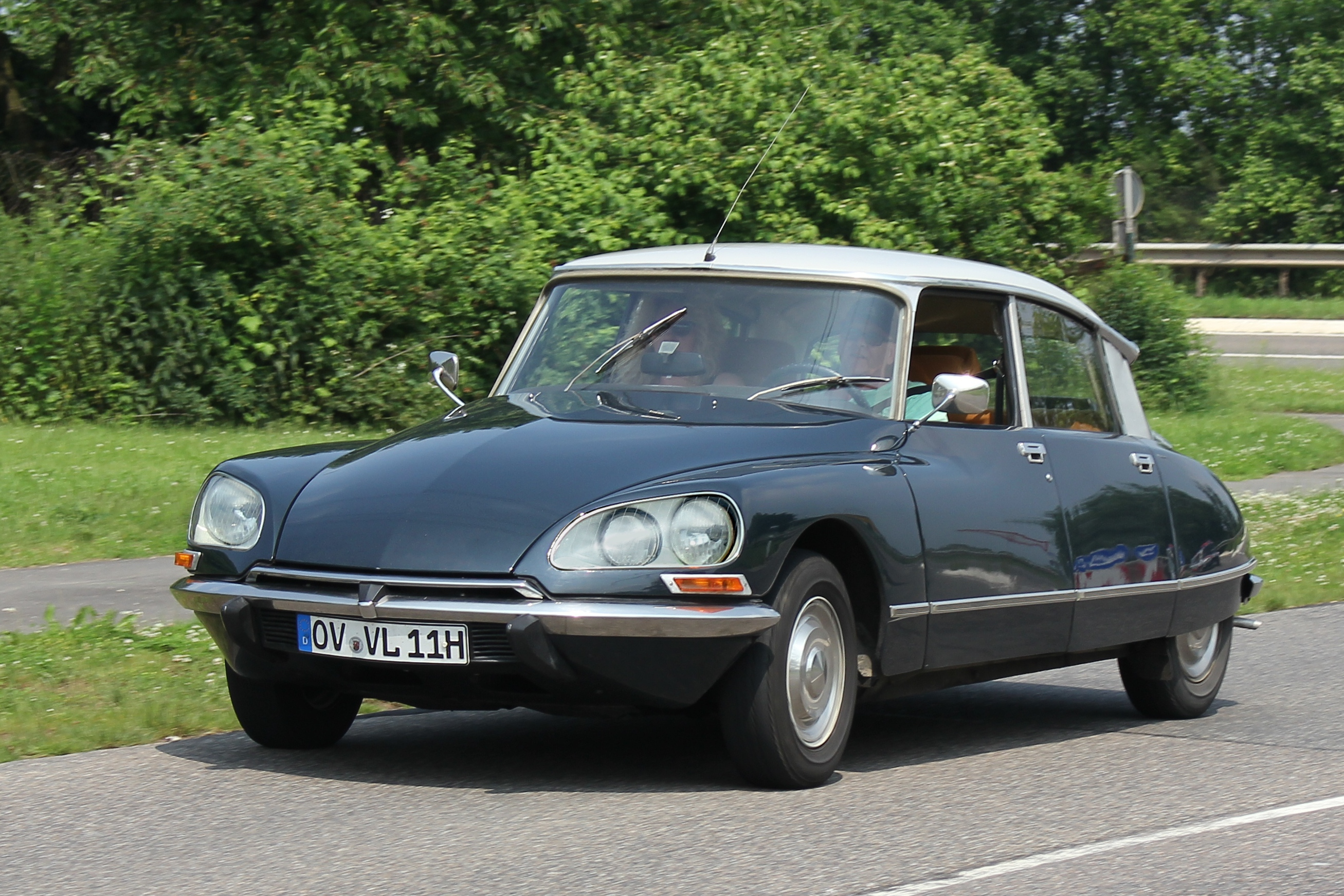

==== High pressure hydraulics ====
This high-pressure hydraulic system would form the basis of over 9 million Citroën cars, including the DS, SM, GS, CX, BX, XM, Xantia, C5, and C6. Self-levelling suspension is the principal user benefit: the car maintains a constant ride height above the road, regardless of passenger and cargo load and despite the very soft suspension. Hydropneumatic suspension is uniquely able to absorb road irregularities without disturbing the occupants and is often compared to riding on a magic carpet for this reason. These vehicles shared the distinguishing feature of rising to operating ride height when the engine was turned on, like a "mechanical camel" (per Car & Driver magazine). A lever (later replaced by an electronic switch) beside the driver's seat allowed the driver to adjust the height of the car; this height adjustability allows for the clearing of obstacles, fording shallow (slow-moving) streams and changing tyres.

Since Citroën was underfunded, its vehicles had the tendency to be underdeveloped at launch, with limited distribution and service networks outside France. Consequently, the early DS models experienced teething issues with the complex hydraulic system. Eventually, the hydraulic seals and system component design were sorted, becoming reliable. Licensing such a technological leap forward was pursued to a limited extent: in 1965 the Rolls-Royce Silver Shadow used this type of suspension, while the 1963 Mercedes-Benz 600 and Mercedes-Benz 300SEL 6.3 tried to replicate its advantages with a costly, complex and expensive to maintain, air suspension, that avoided the Citroën-patented technology. By 1975, the Mercedes-Benz 450SEL 6.9 was finally produced with this proven system and Mercedes-Benz continues to offer variations on this technology today. During Citroën's 1968–1975 venture with Maserati, the Citroën high-pressure hydraulic system was used on several Maserati models: for power clutch operation (Bora); power pedal adjustment (Bora); pop-up headlights (Bora, Merak); brakes (Bora, Merak, Khamsin); steering (Khamsin) and the entire Quattroporte II prototype, which was a four-door Citroën SM under the skin.

==== Aerodynamic pioneer ====
Citroën was one of the early pioneers of the now-widespread trend of aerodynamic automobile design, which helps to reduce fuel consumption and to improve high-speed performance, by reducing wind resistance. The DS could happily cruise at 160 km/h (100 mph) without any discomfort for the occupants. The firm began using a wind tunnel in the 1950s, helping them to create highly streamlined cars, like the DS, that were years ahead of their competitors, and so good were the aerodynamics of the CX model, that it took its name – $\mathbf c_\mathrm x\,$ – from the mathematical term used to measure the drag coefficient.

==== Expansion and financial challenges ====
In the 1960s, Citroën undertook a series of financial and development decisions, aiming to build on its strength of the 1950s with the successful 2CV, Type H, and DS models. Nevertheless, these maneuvers were insufficiently effective, and Citroën went bankrupt again in 1974.

These measures were to address two key gaps facing the company:

- First, the lack of a mid-size car, between its own range of very small, cheap passenger vehicles (2CV/Ami) and the large, expensive models (DS/ID). In today's terms, this would be similar to a brand consisting only of the Tata Nano and Jaguar XJ. Because of its potential volume, the mid-size segment was the most profitable part of the car market and, in 1965, the Citroënesque Renault 16 stepped in to fill it.
- The second major issue was the lack of a powerful engine, suitable for export markets. The post-WW2 Tax horsepower system in France was steeply progressive and vehicles over 2.0 (later 2.8) litres displacement faced a heavy annual tax, with the result that cars made in France were considered underpowered outside the country. For both the 1955 DS and 1974 CX models, development of the original engine around which the design was planned proved too expensive for the available finances, so the actual engine used in both cases was a modest and outdated four-cylinder design.

These steps include:

- 1963 – opened negotiations with Peugeot to cooperate in the purchase of raw materials and equipment, but talks broke off in 1965.
- 1964 – partnered with NSU Motorenwerke to develop the Wankel engine via the Comobil (later Comotor) subsidiary. For Citroën, this represented the chance for a technological run around the French Tax horsepower system by producing a more powerful but still small power plant. The first production car developed 106 hp from a 1-litre engine, while the standard GS delivered 55 hp with a 1-litre engine.
- 1965 – took over the French maker Panhard in the hope of using its expertise in mid-sized cars; cooperation between the two companies had begun twelve years earlier and they had agreed to a partial merger of their sales networks in 1953; Panhard ceased manufacturing in 1967.
- 1965 – purchased the truck manufacturer Berliet.
- 1968 – purchased the Italian sports car maker Maserati again with an eye to producing a more powerful car, keeping a small engine in line with the French tax horsepower system. The first production vehicle developed 170 hp with a 2.7 litre engine, this was the 1970 SM, which featured a V6 Maserati power plant, hydropneumatic suspension and a fully powered, self-centering steering system called DIRAVI; the SM was engineered as if it were replacing the DS family car, a level of investment that the small luxury Grand Touring car sector alone would never be able to support, even in the best of circumstances.
- 1968 – restructured worldwide operations under a new holding company, Citroën SA. Michelin, Citroën's longtime controlling shareholder, sold a 49% stake to Fiat in what was referred to as the PARDEVI agreement (Participation et Développement Industriels).

The teams of Charles Marchetti and Citroën began working together on the development of the RE-2 helicopter.

From a model range perspective, the 1970s started well, supported by the successful launch of the long-awaited mid-size Citroën GS, finally filling the huge gap between the 2CV and the DS – with a 1-litre, hydropneumatically suspended car. The GS went on to sell 2.5 million units; 601,918 cars were produced in 1972 alone, up from the 526,443 of 1971, and enough to lift the company past Peugeot into second place among French auto makers when ranked by sales volume. The older models continued to sell well: the peak production period of the DS was 1970, and 2CV was in 1974.

As the 1970s progressed, circumstances became more unfavourable. In 1973, Fiat sold back to Michelin its 49% stake in the PARDEVI holding company that owned Citroën, the Citroën and Fiat joint announcement indicated that the benefits foreseen for their union in 1968 had failed to materialise. This was not in line with the tyre company's long-term strategy of ending involvements in the car manufacturing business and created a very unstable ownership situation. The company suffered another financial blow with the 1973 energy crisis. The gamble on Comotor and Maserati showed that there was a serious flaw with the plan particularly for companies producing engines with high fuel consumption.

In 1974, the carmaker withdrew from North America due to U.S. design regulations that outlawed core features of Citroën cars (see Citroën SM).

Huge losses at Citroën were caused by the failure of the Comotor rotary engine venture added to the strategic management error of going the 15 years from 1955 to 1970 without a model in the profitable middle range of the European market, plus the massive development costs a string of new models: the GS, GS Birotor, CX, SM, Maserati Bora, Maserati Merak, Maserati Quattroporte II, and Maserati Khamsin. Each of these models is a technological marvel in its own right. Thus, forty years after the bankruptcy related to the Traction Avant, Citroën went bankrupt again, losing its existence as an independent entity; selling Berliet and Maserati and closing Comotor.

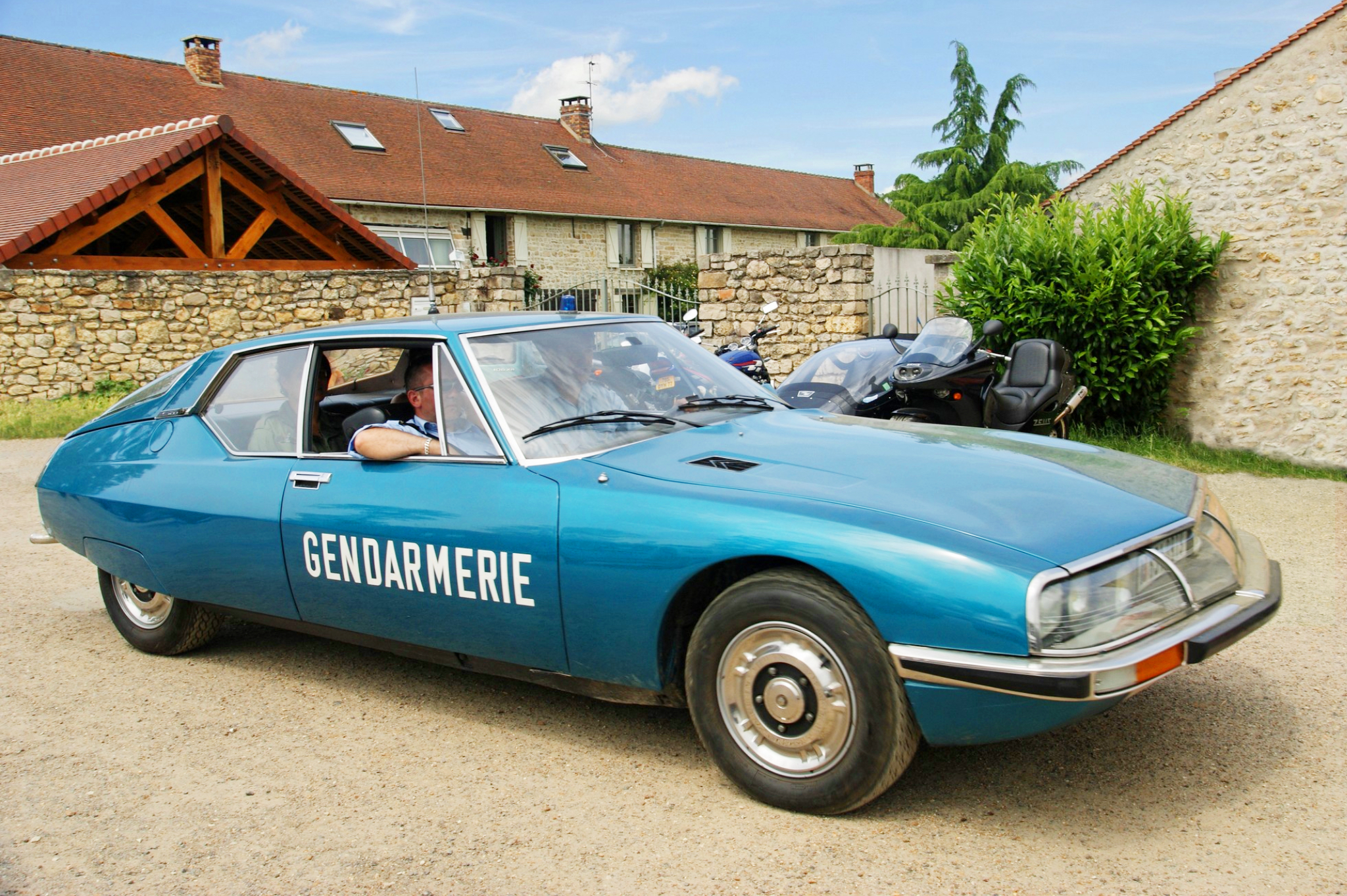
Citroën SM

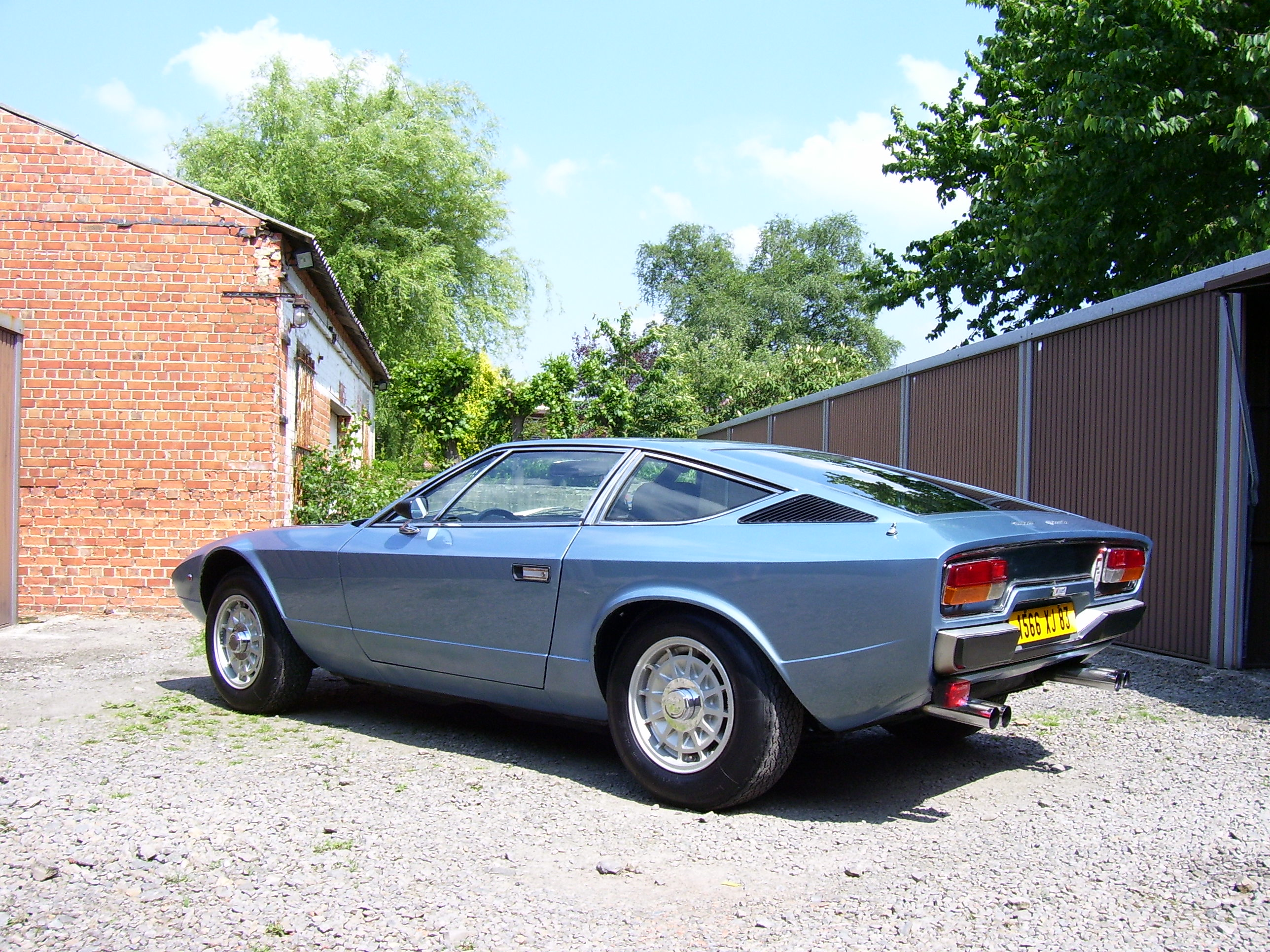
Maserati Khamsin

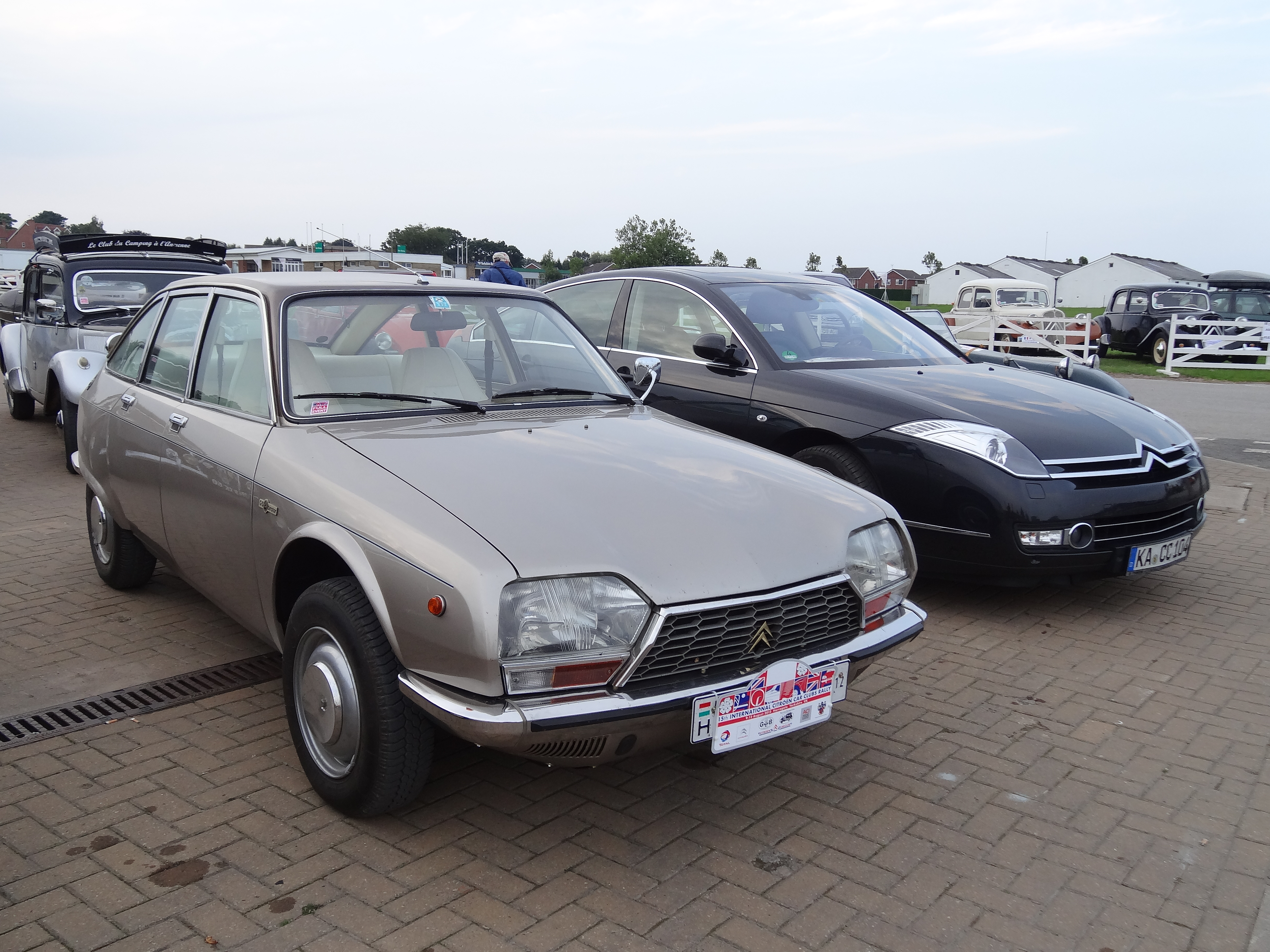
Citroën GS Birotor and Citroën C6

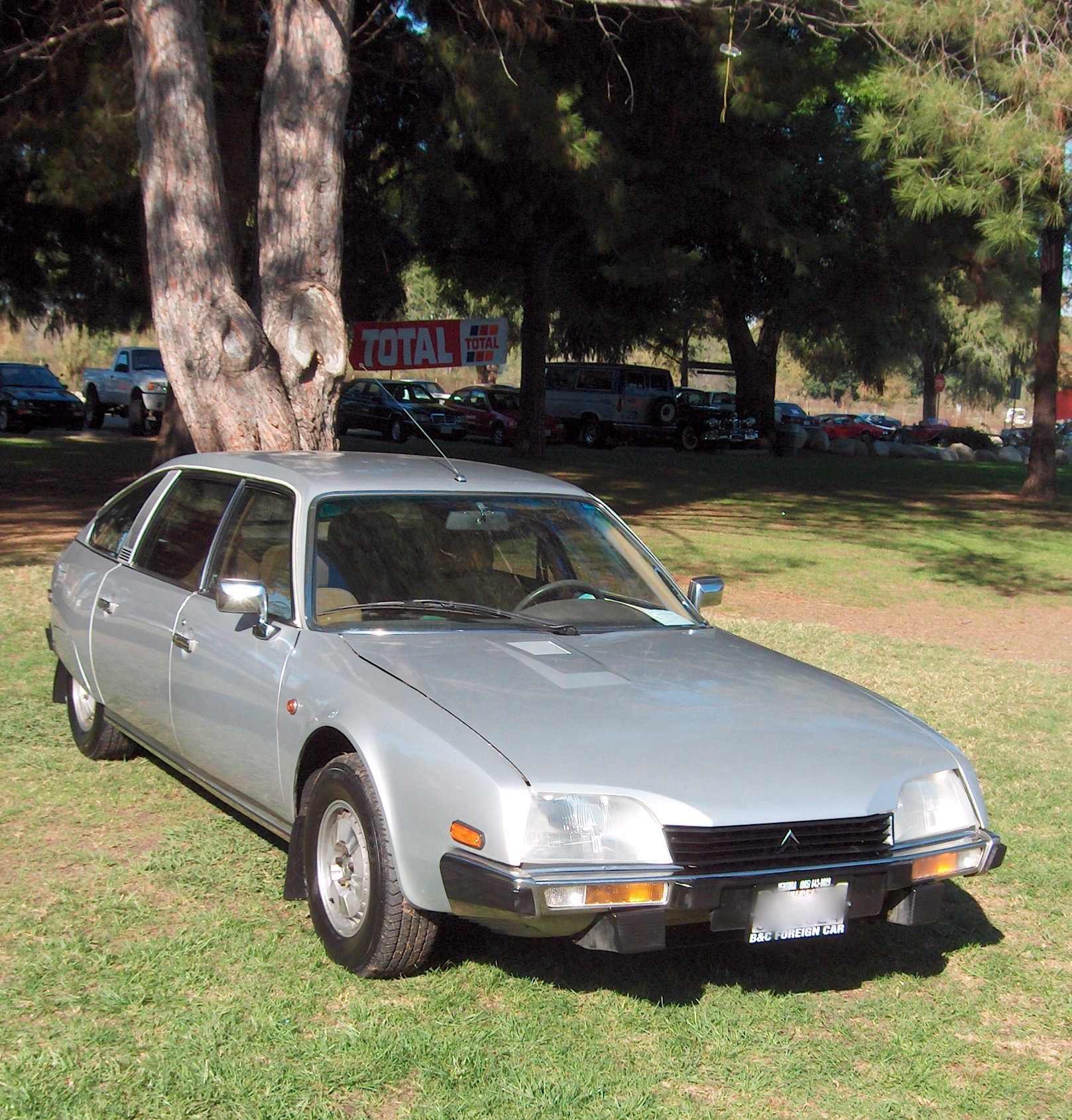
Citroën CX, the 1975 Car of the Year in Europe

=== PSA Peugeot Citroën era ===
Fearing large job losses due to the poor cash flow situation and the unstable ownership structure, the French government arranged talks between Citroën and Michelin culminating in the merger of Automobiles Citroën and Automobiles Peugeot into a single company. Thus, one year after the break with Fiat, on 24 June 1974 Citroën announced the new partnership, this time with Peugeot. to whom Michelin agreed to transfer control of the business. In December 1974 Peugeot S.A. acquired a 38.2% share of Citroën and on 9 April 1976 it increased its stake of the then bankrupt company to 89.95%, thus creating the PSA Group (where PSA is short for Peugeot Société Anonyme), becoming PSA Peugeot Citroën. In May 1975 Maserati was sold to De Tomaso and the new Italian owner was thereby able to exploit the sales potential of the models and technology developed by Citroën, as well as to utilise the image of the Maserati brand in a downward brand extension to sell 40,000 of the newly designed Bi-Turbo models. The truck manufacturing company Berliet was sold to Renault.

This new PSA venture was a financial success from 1976 to 1979. Citroën had two successful new designs in the market, the GS and CX. In the wake of the oil crisis, the brand also had resurgent sales for the 2CV and the Dyane, and soon the Peugeot 104 based Citroën Visa and Citroën LNA. Peugeot was typically prudent with its own finances. Then, PSA purchased the ageing assets and substantial liabilities of Chrysler Europe for $1, leading to losses from 1980 to 1985. PSA resurrected the Talbot name for the Chrysler cars, but stopped producing cars with the badge in 1987 as the cars were considered unreliable and poorly-made.

At the 2019 Geneva International Motor Show, the manufacturer presented the Ami One concept car to celebrate its 100th anniversary. Then, in May 2019, it unveiled the Citroën 19_19 Concept at the Viva Technology show in Paris.

==== Conflict with the trade unions ====
In the early 1980s, Citroën was targeted by union action. On 25 May 1982, events led to a mass demonstration in the streets of Paris, when approximately 27,000 workers affirmed their wish to work at a company, which was being picketed by striking workers who had been blocking access to the factories for four weeks. The demonstration was successful and six days later work at the plants resumed. Jacques Lombard, one of the company's senior managers, had gone public with his concerns, criticising the strikes.

==== Changing design language ====
PSA gradually diluted Citroën's ambitious, highly individualistic, and distinctive approach to engineering and styling. All through the 1980s, Citroën models became increasingly Peugeot-like. The 1982 BX used the hydropneumatic suspension system and had a typical Citroënesque appearance, whilst being powered by Peugeot-derived engines and using the floorpan later seen on the Peugeot 405. In this respect PSA followed the worldwide motor industry trend of platform sharing which is a logical way to reduce costs whilst selling apparently different models. By the late 1980s, many of the distinctive features of the brand had been removed or altered. Peugeot's conventional switchgear replaced Citroën's quirky but ergonomic Lunule designs, complete with self-cancelling indicators that Citroën had refused to adopt on ergonomic grounds. The cars were "more banal and conventional", but also able to break into new markets, like fleet vehicles in the UK.

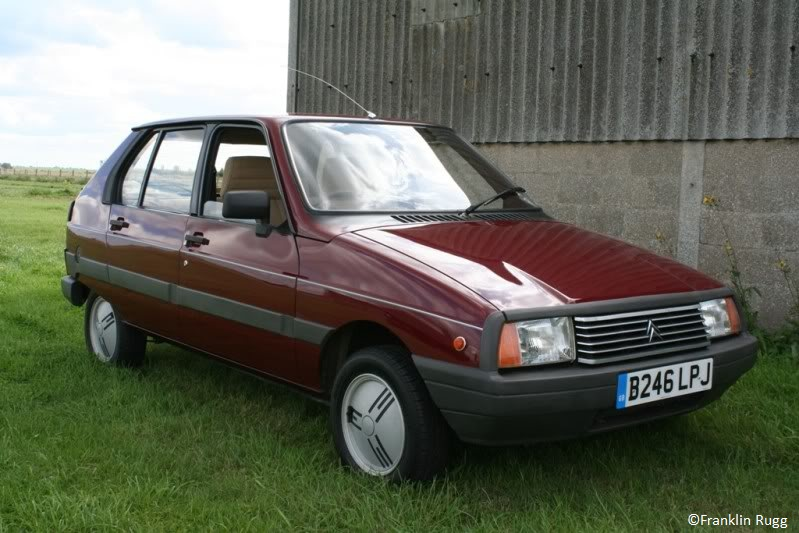
1984 Citroën Visa

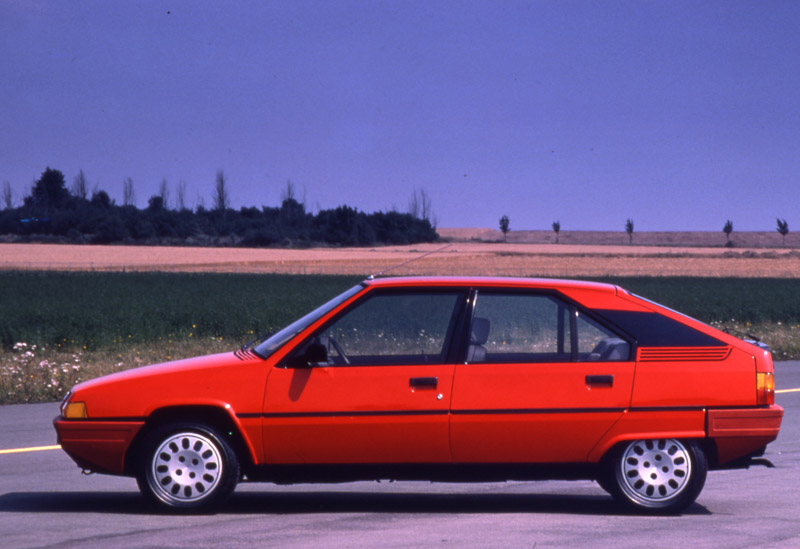
1982 Citroën BX

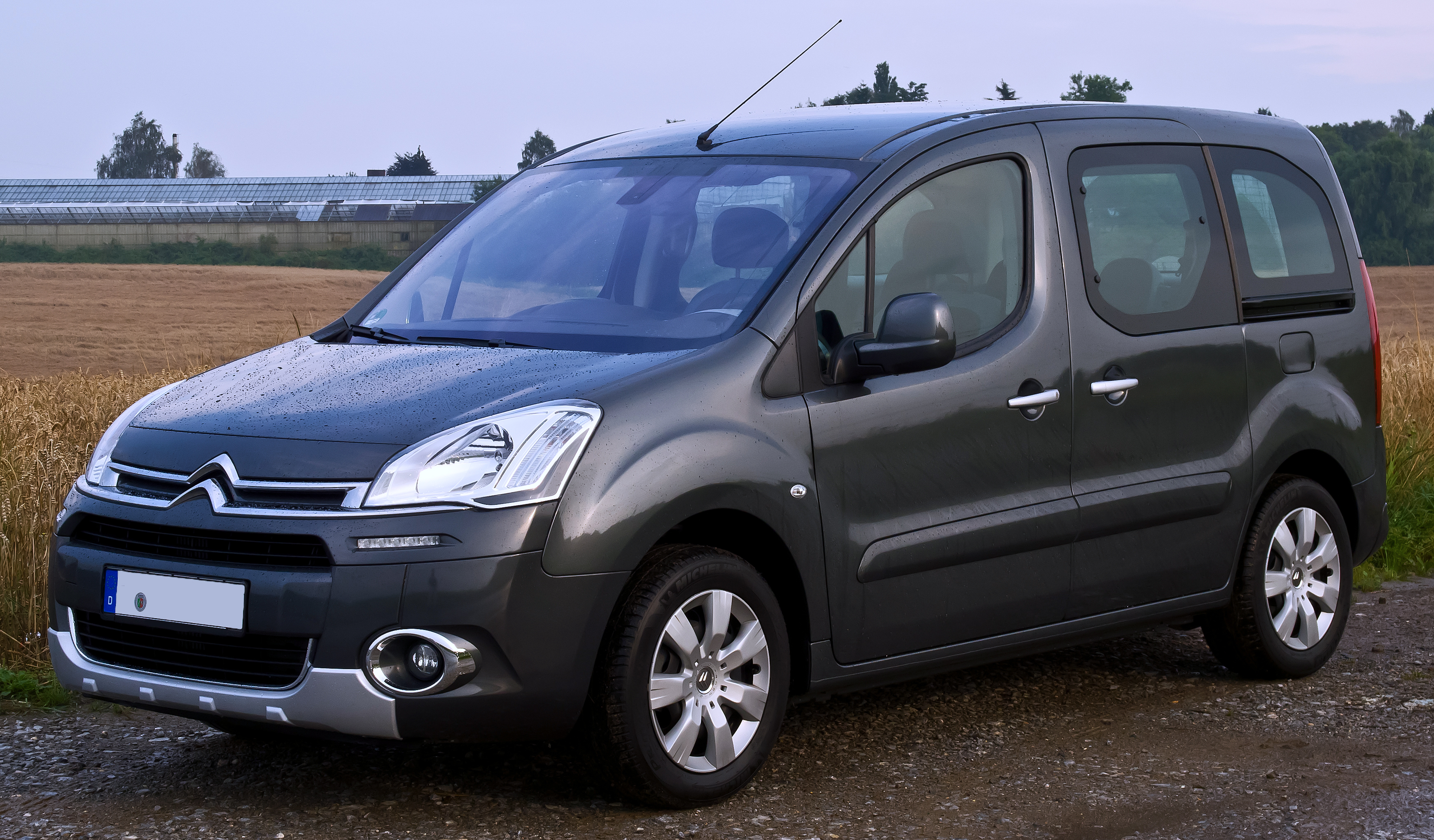
Citroën Berlingo

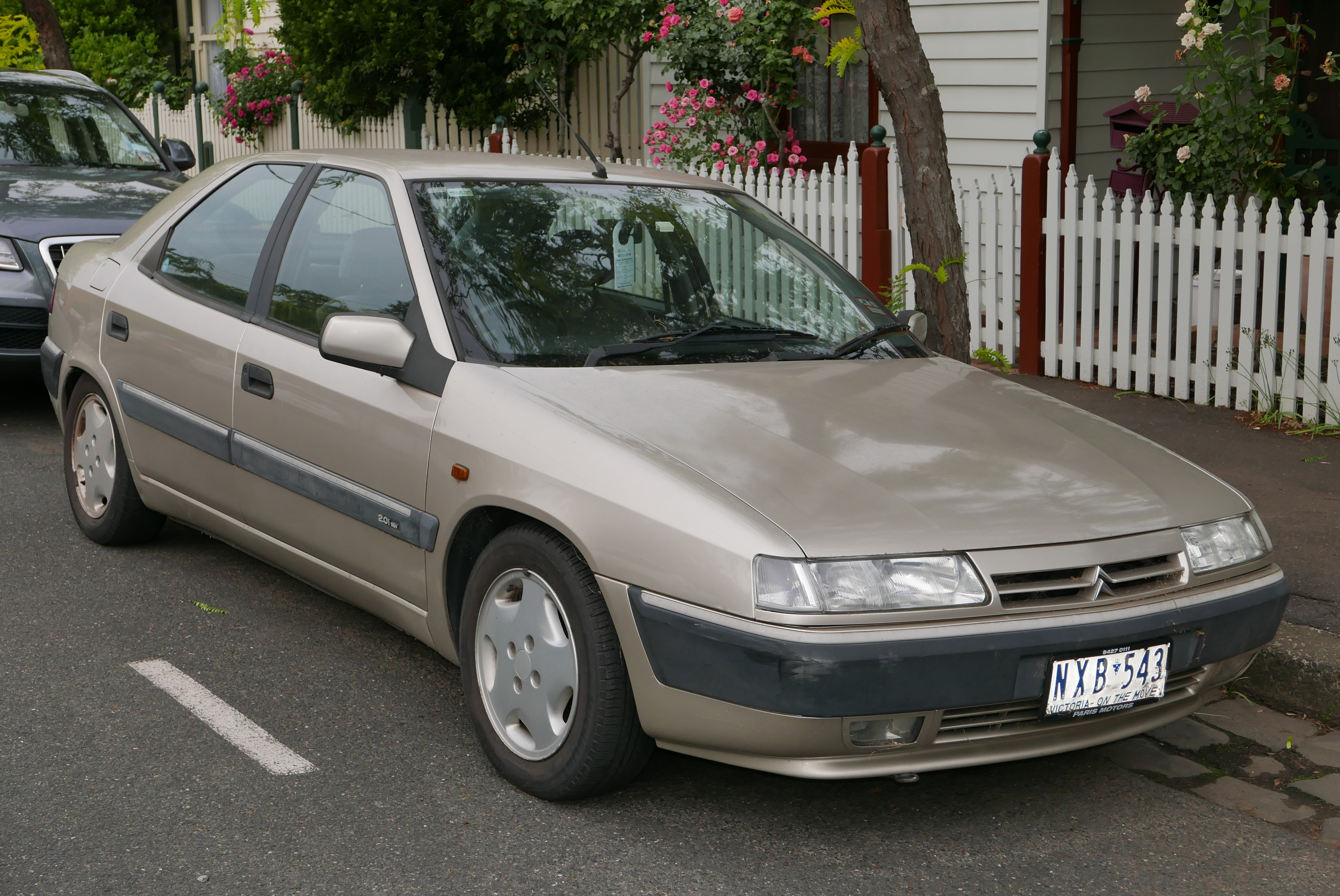
Citroën Xantia

==== Geographic expansion ====
In the meantime Citroën expanded into many new global markets. Beyond existing manufacturing plants in Argentina, Chile, Vietnam, and Yugoslavia, it added Iran, Greece, Romania, and China.

In the late 1970s, the firm developed a small car for production in Romania known as the Oltcit, which it sold in Western Europe as the Citroën Axel. That joint venture has now ended, but a new one between PSA and Toyota is now producing cars like the Citroën C1 in the Czech Republic.

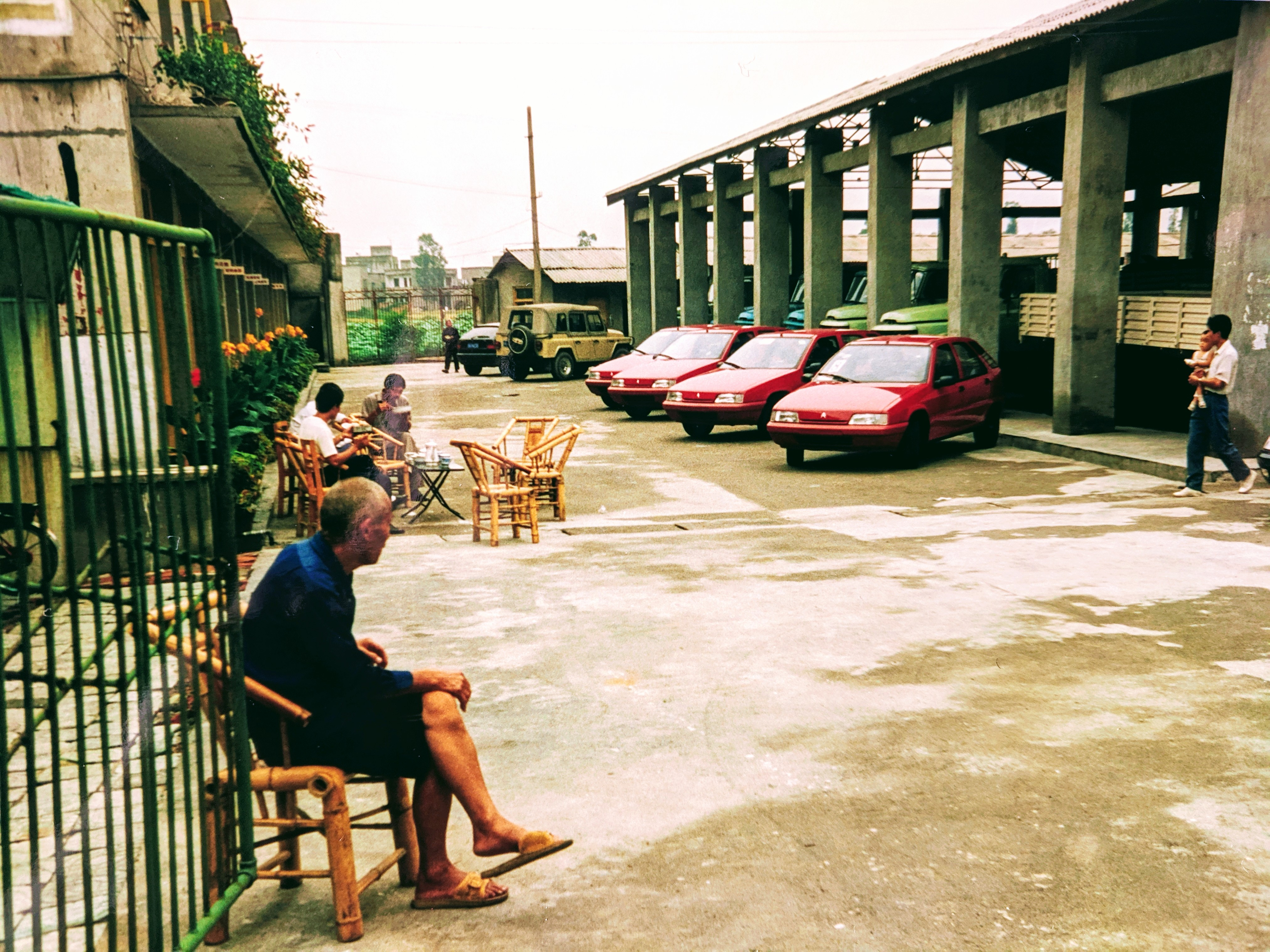
New Citroën ZX Fukang models for sale in Chengdu 1994 – made by truck manufacturer Second Automobile Works (第二汽车制造厂) through Dongfeng Peugeot-Citroën joint venture.

The China joint venture began selling cars in 1984 and building them in 1994. The range of family cars there included the C3 and Xsara and locally designed cars like the Fukang and Elysée models. By 2014 the brand had increased its Chinese sales by 30%, amid overall market growth of 11%, and ranked highest in China's 2014 JD Power satisfaction survey.

Citroën is a global brand, except in North America, where the company has not returned since the SM was effectively banned in 1974 for not meeting U.S. National Highway Traffic Safety Administration (NHTSA) bumper height regulations.

In 2015, the Spanish National Commission on Markets and Competition fined Automóviles Citroën España, S.A with over 14 million euros because it operated a cartel with other car builders and sellers controlling 91% of the Spanish market between 2006 and 2013. They shared information about sales and repairs anti-competitively.

In 2016, Peugeot–Citroën South Africa (PCSA) announced that it was going to stop importing new Citroën models into South Africa in order to focus on increasing Peugeot's sales in the country. In May 2019, it was reported that PCSA would reintroduce the Citroën brand into South Africa, this was later confirmed by PCSA, in August 2019, that new Citroën models will go on sale in the middle of October 2019.

=== Recent decades ===
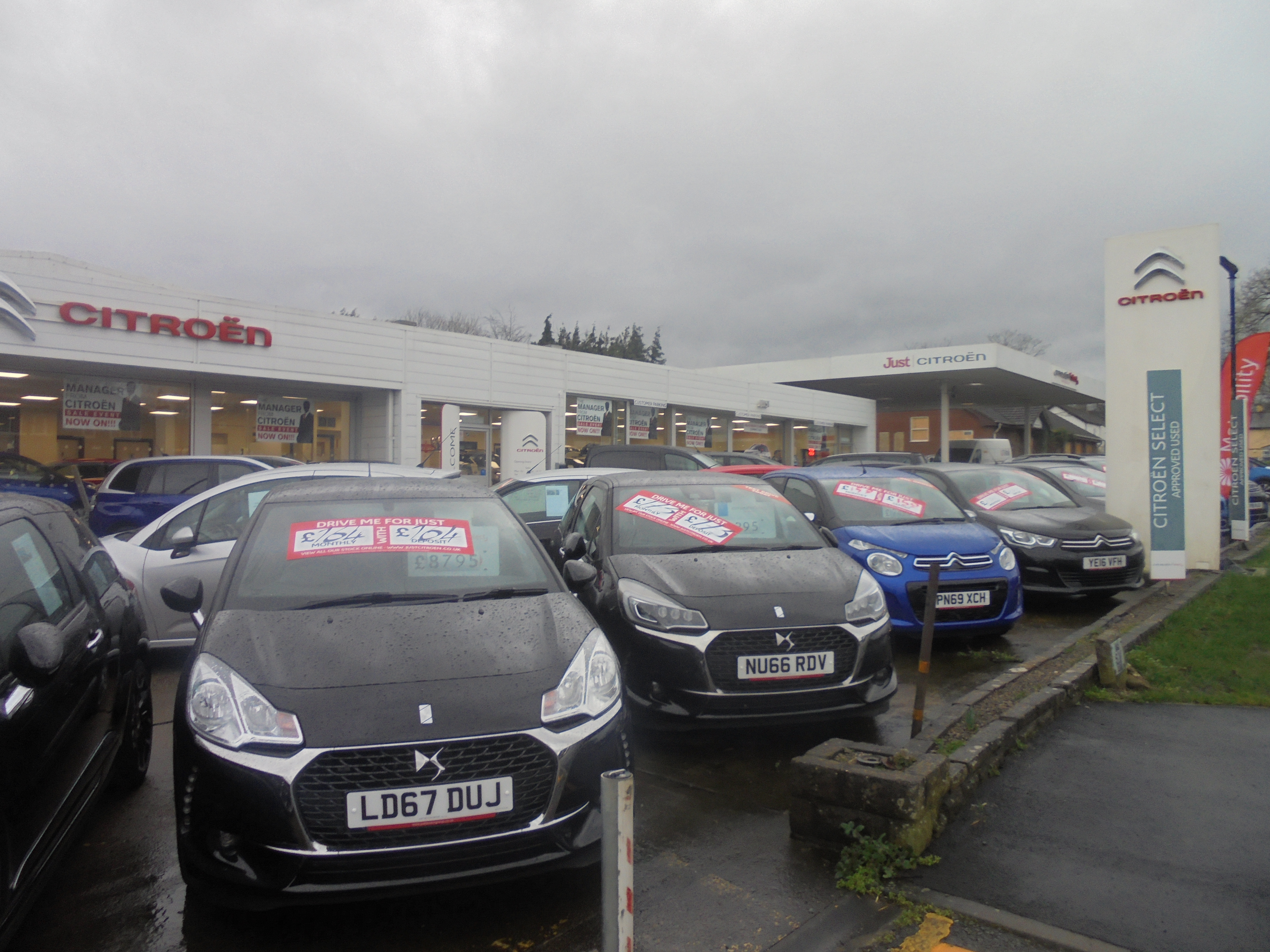
Citroën dealership in Harrogate, North Yorkshire.

From 2003 to 2010, Citroën produced the C3 Pluriel, an unusual convertible with allusions to the 1948–1990 2CV model, both in body style (such as the bonnet) and in its all-round practicality. In 2001 it celebrated its history of innovation when it opened a museum of its many significant vehicles: the Conservatoire with 300 cars. In line with the severe decline in European car sales after 2009, worldwide sales of vehicles declined from 1,460,373 in 2010 to 1,435,688 in 2011, with 961,156 of these sold in Europe.

In 2011, the PSA Group was close to forming a partnership with BMW, for the development of electric and hybrid vehicles, but the talks fell through, shortly after Groupe PSA, Citroën's parent company, had announced a partnership with GM, which later also failed. Dongfeng Peugeot-Citroën continues growing, and has developed eight new car designs exclusively for the China market. By 2016 Citroën (and Peugeot) faced the same challenge as Volkswagen in China: there were too many sedans and hatchbacks, but not enough models in the strong selling SUV and minivan/MPV categories.

The brand ranked highest in the 2014 customer satisfaction survey by JD Power in China, above luxury brands like Mercedes-Benz and BMW, and above mass market brands, like Volkswagen, ranking only thirteenth and seventeenth respectively. In the first ten months of 2014 in China, the sales of Dongfeng Citroën cars increased by 30% in an overall market growth of 11%. Despite the near-death financial experience of PSA Peugeot Citroën in 2014, and financial rescue by Dongfeng Motors, the Citroën and DS brands worked to develop new technologies with the hope to grow 15% by 2020, according to Citroën CEO Linda Jackson and DS CEO Yves Bonnefont. In the end sales of the Citroën and DS brands in Europe and China fell by 22% by 2019, and fell even further during the 2020 COVID outbreak.

In January 2020, Linda Jackson was succeeded as CEO of Citroën by the deputy CEO Vincent Cobée, and she would instead "lead a study to clarify and support brand differentiation within a brand portfolio".

Citroën entered the Indian market in early 2021 with the launch of the C5 Aircross SUV manufactured at the Hindustan Motors Thiruvallur plant in Tamil Nadu, India. In the first quarter of 2026, the brand saw a 107% increase in sales in India, driven in particular by the C3).

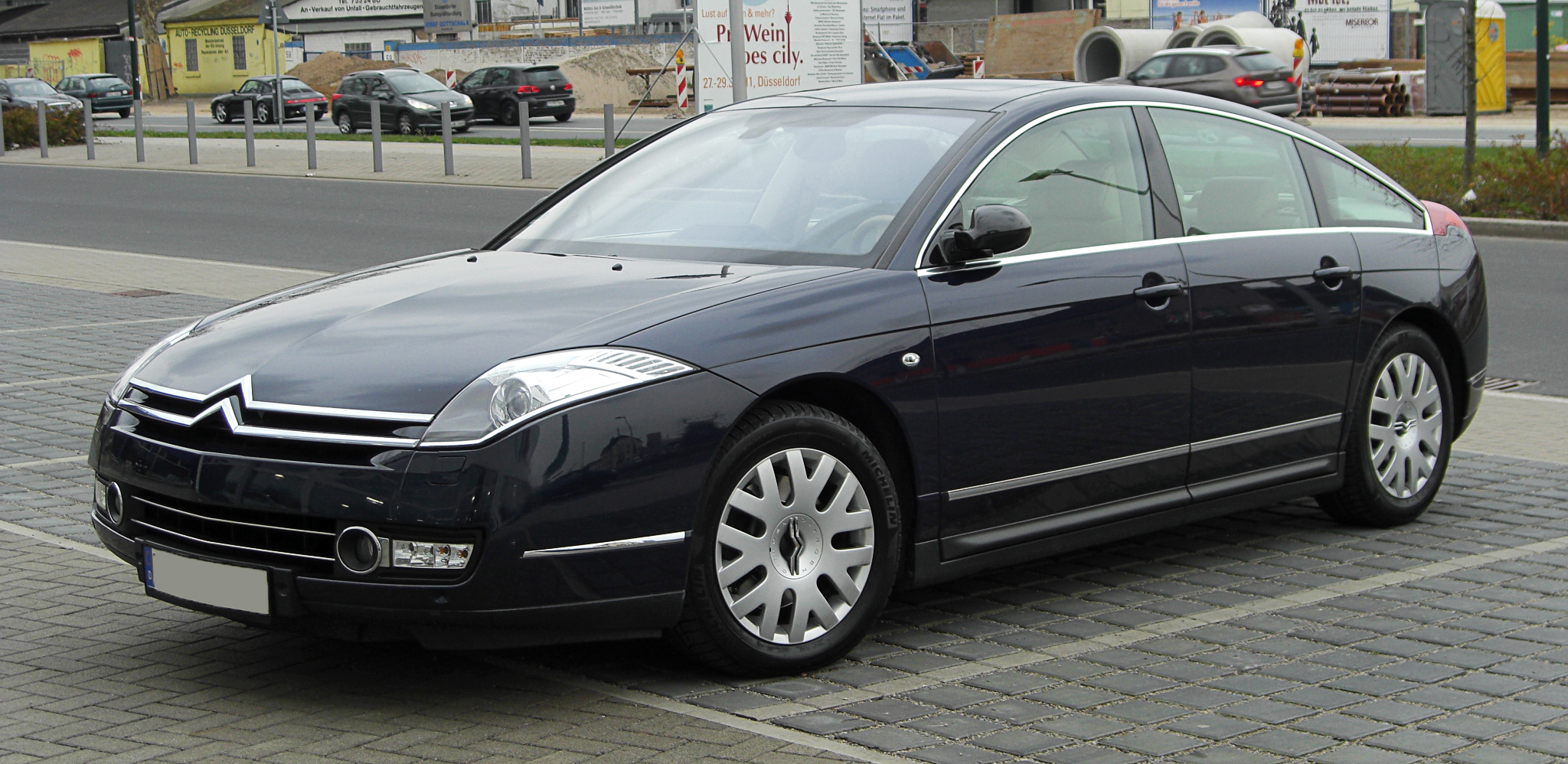
Citroën C6 production top of range sedan

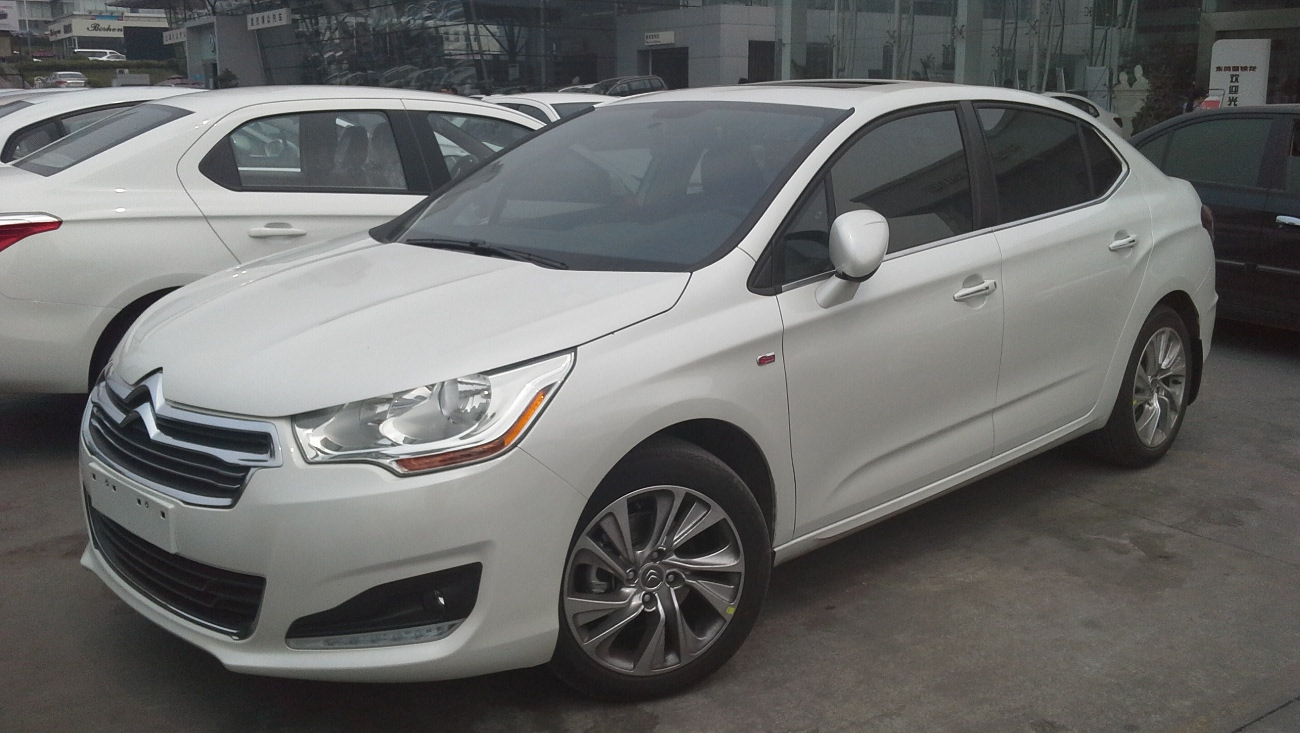
Citroën C4L built in Argentina, Russia, and China (Dongfeng Peugeot-Citroën)

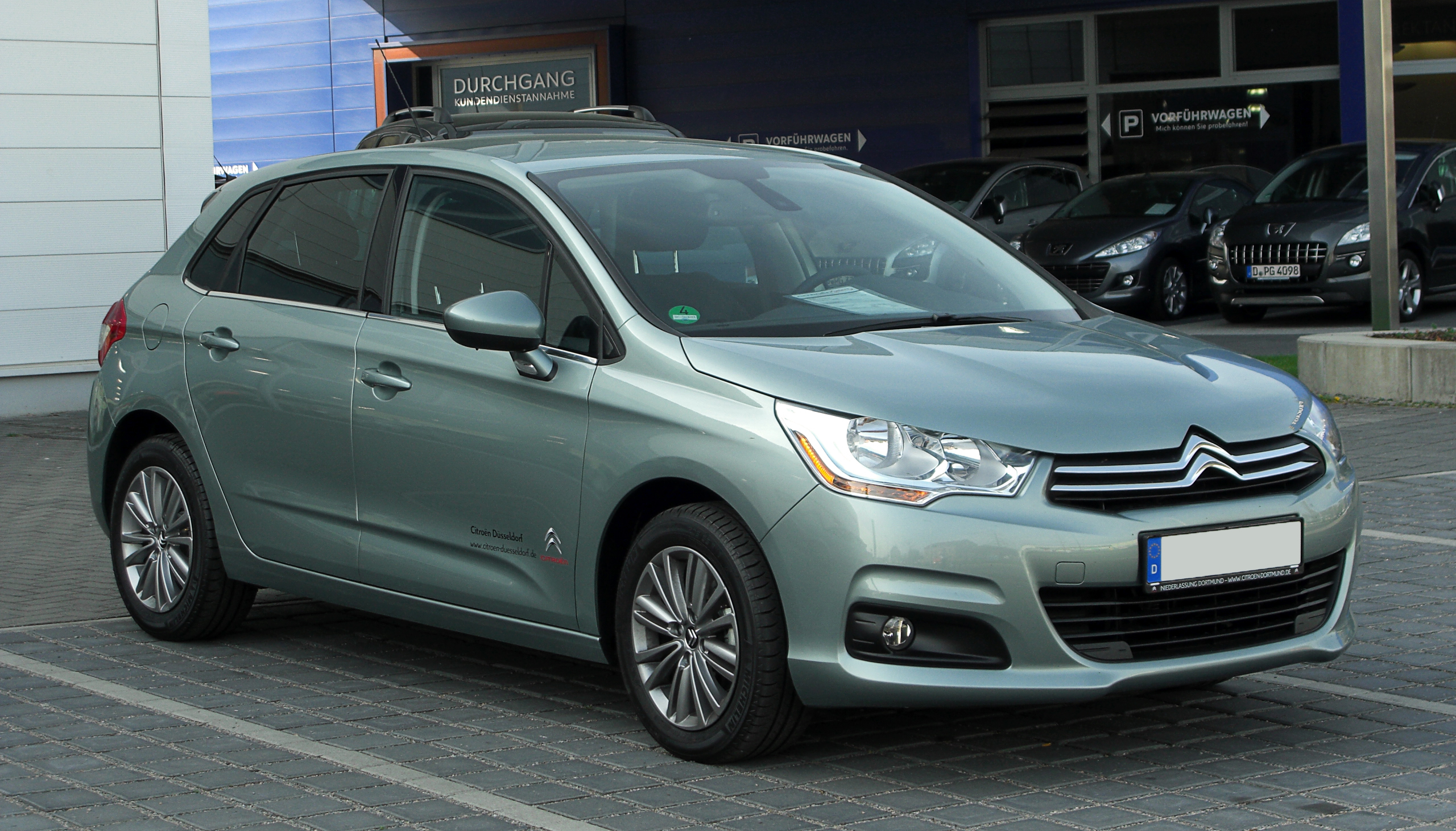
Citroën C4

=== DS brand ===
In early 2009, Citroën announced the development of the premium brand DS, for Different Spirit or Distinctive Series (although the reference to the historical Citroën DS is evident), to run in parallel to its mainstream cars. The slogan of the DS car marque is "Spirit of avant-garde".

This new series of cars started early in 2010, with the DS3, a small car based on the floorpan of the new C3. The DS3 is based on the concept that preceded the C3 Pluriel production model and the Citroën DS Inside concept car. The DS3 is customisable with various roof colours contrasting with the body panels; it was named 2010 Car of the Year by Top Gear Magazine, and was awarded best supermini four times in a row by the JD Power Satisfaction Survey UK and second most efficient supermini (Citroën DS3 1.6 e-HDi 115 Airdream: True MPG 63.0mpg) by What car? behind the C3. In 2013 the DS3 was again the best-selling premium subcompact car, with 40% of the European market share, validating the business model of this product development.

The DS series is deeply connected to Citroën, as the DS4 launched in 2010, is based on the 2008 Citroën Hypnos concept car and the DS5, which followed in 2015 being based on the 2005 C-SportLounge concept car. The rear badge is a new DS logo rather than the familiar Citroën double chevron and all will have markedly different styling from their equivalent sister cars. Citroën has produced several dramatic looking concept sports cars of late, with the fully working Citroën Survolt being badged as a DS. Indeed, the 2014 DS Divine concept car develops the Citroën Survolt prototype as the future sport coupé of the DS range.

In China, Citroën has standalone DS showrooms, as well as entire plants built specifically for the production of these vehicles. Since 2014 Citroën has sold the Chinese-built DS 5LS and DS 6WR in China.

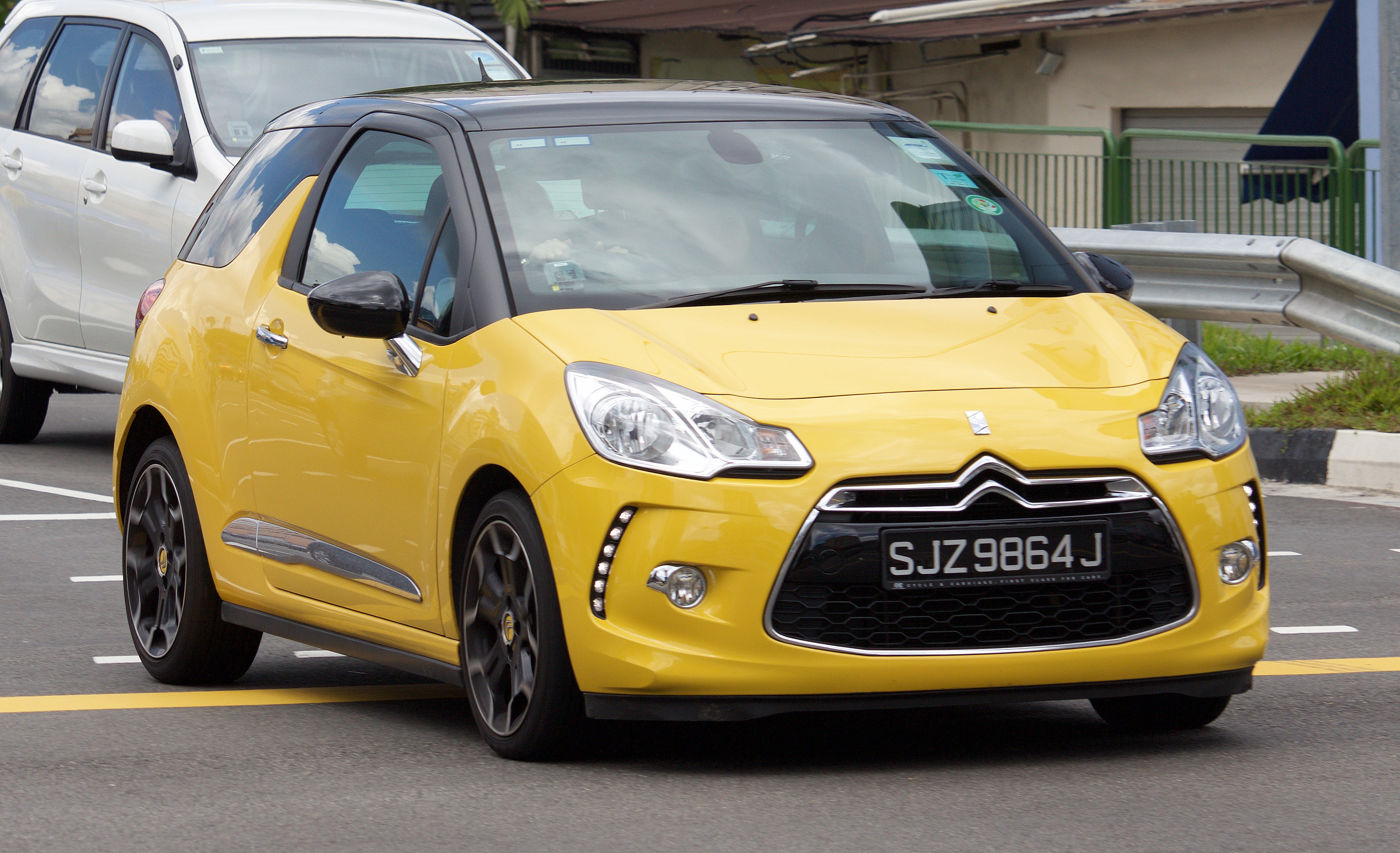
Citroën DS3, the most sold premium car of its category

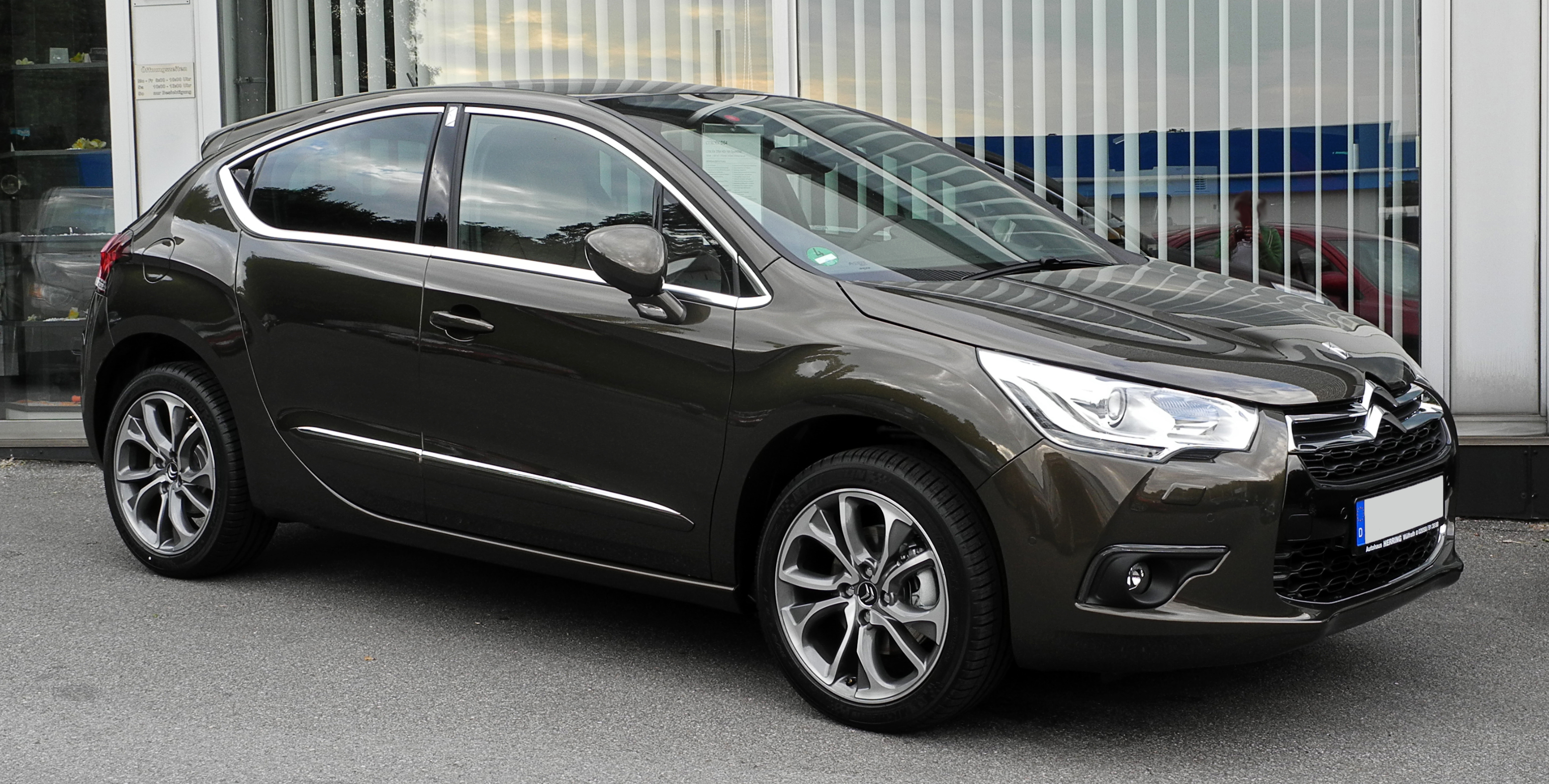
Citroën DS4 Sport Chic, C segment

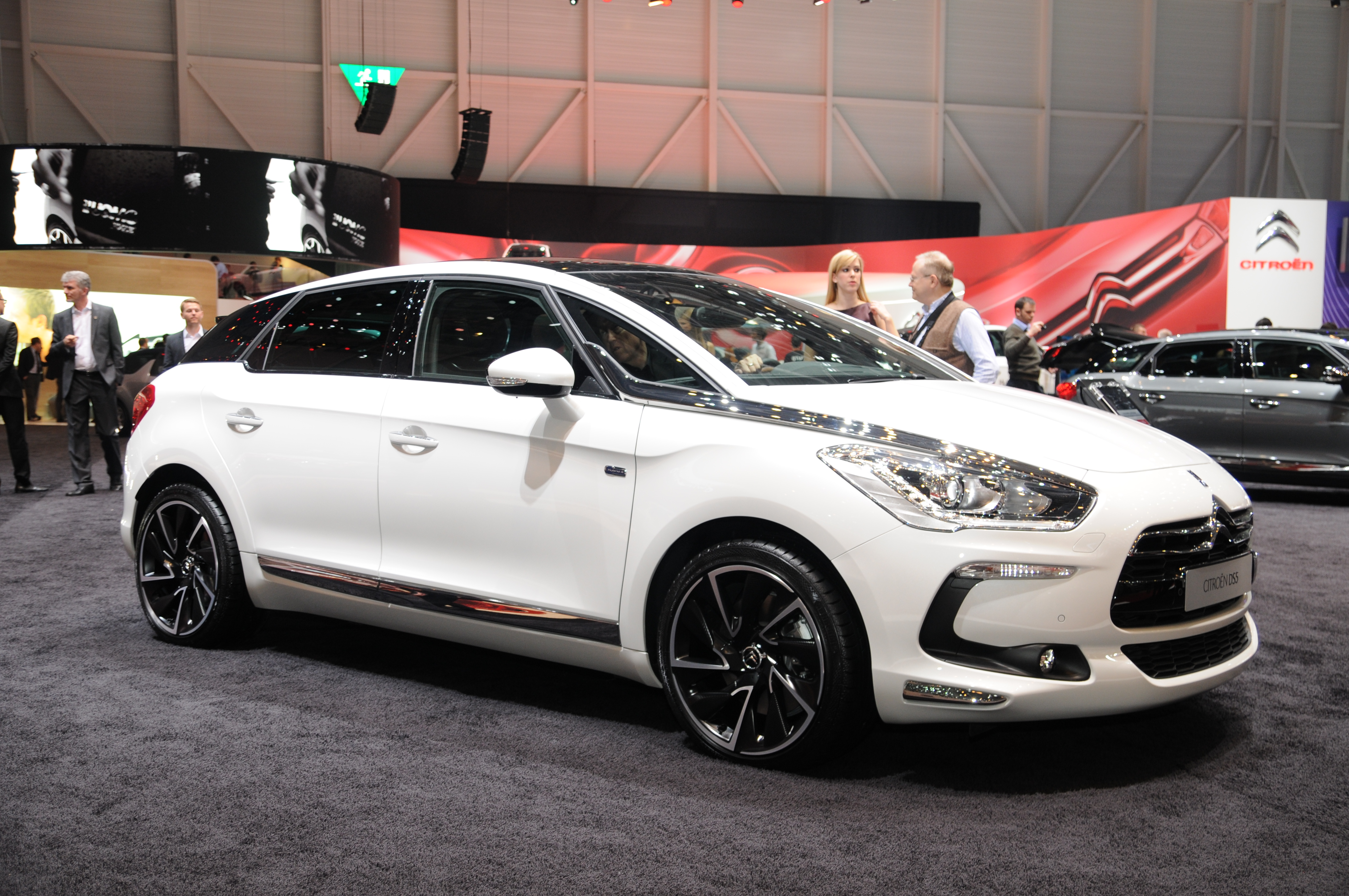
DS 5, D segment

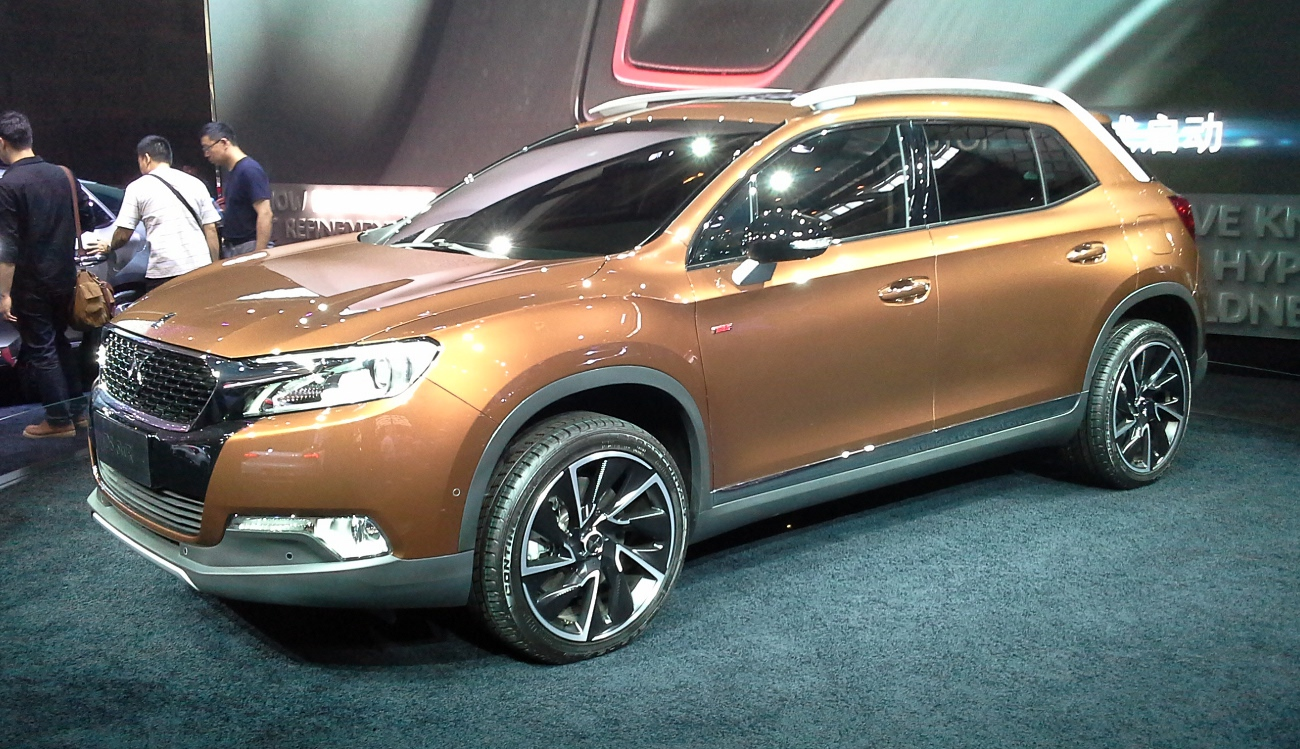
DS 6, SUV segment – developed for China

== List of CEOs ==
Current: Xavier Chardon (since May 2025)

=== Previous CEOs ===
- Claude Satinet (1998–2007)
- Giles Michel (2007–2008)
- Jean-Marc Gales (2008–2009)
- Frédéric Banzet (2009–2014)
- Linda Jackson (2014–2020)
- Vincent Cobée (2020–2023)
- Thierry Koskas (2023–2025)

== Advertising ==
Citroën was the first to write in the sky with an airplane. On 4 October 1922, during the opening of the Auto Show, a plane traced the word "Citroën" in smoke letters across the Paris sky.

The firm also contracted Jean Giraud to launch a promotion comic strip for its sales force, several years before 1987.

== Awards ==
Citroën was recognised in the 1999 Car of the Century competition as producing the third most influential car of the 20th century, the Citroën DS, behind the Ford Model T and BMC Mini.

Citroën has produced three winners of the 50-year-old European Car of the Year award, and many rated second or third place.

- 1971 – Citroën GS
- 1972 – Citroën SM
- 1975 – Citroën CX
- 1990 – Citroën XM

Citroën has produced one winner of the United States Motor Trend Car of the Year award – the original Car of the Year designation, which began in 1949. This was especially significant because this award used to be only given to cars designed and built in the United States.

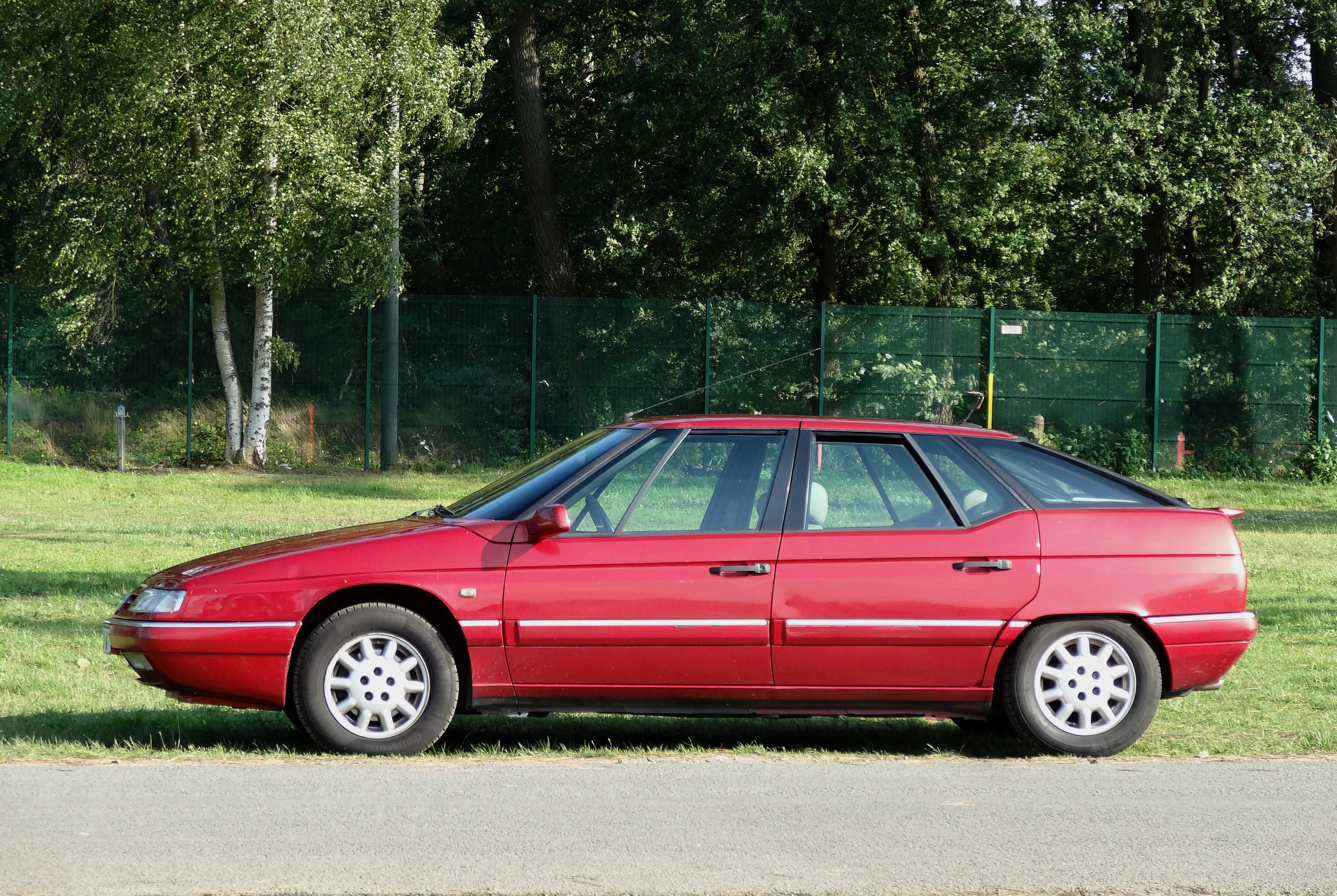
Citroën XM 1990 COTY in Europe

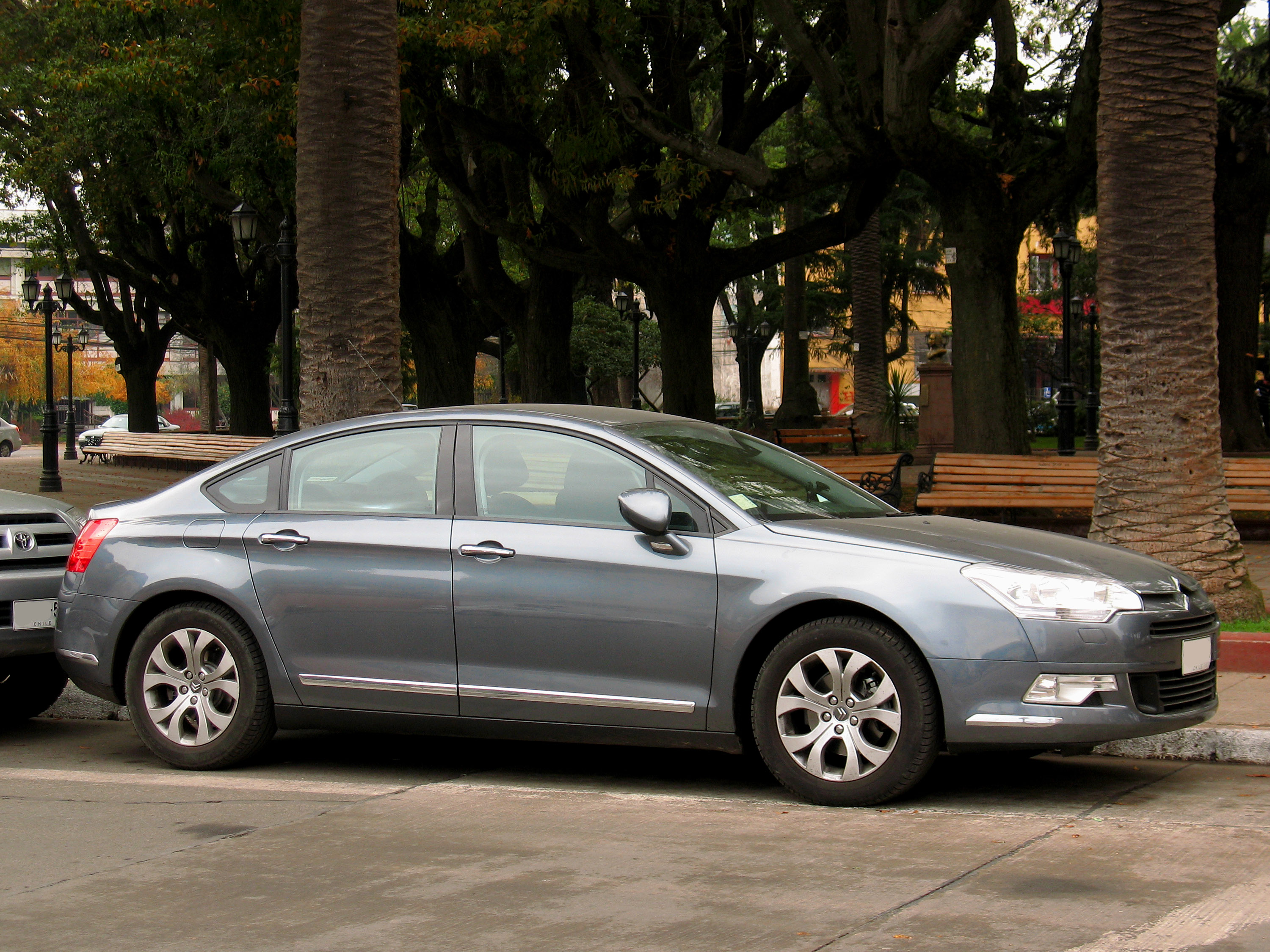
Citroën C5 2009 COTY in Ireland and Spain

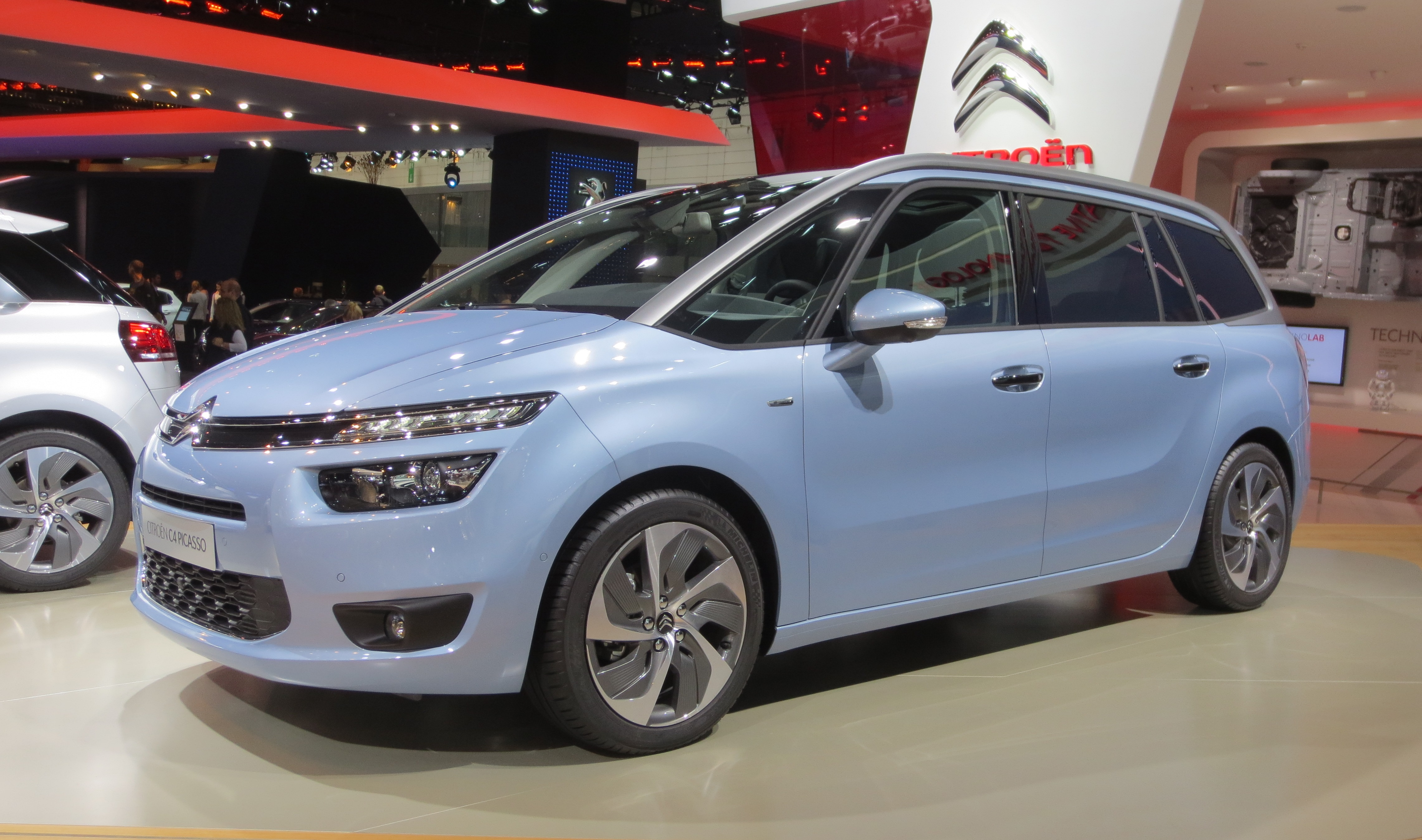
Citroën C4 Picasso, 2014 COTY in Ireland

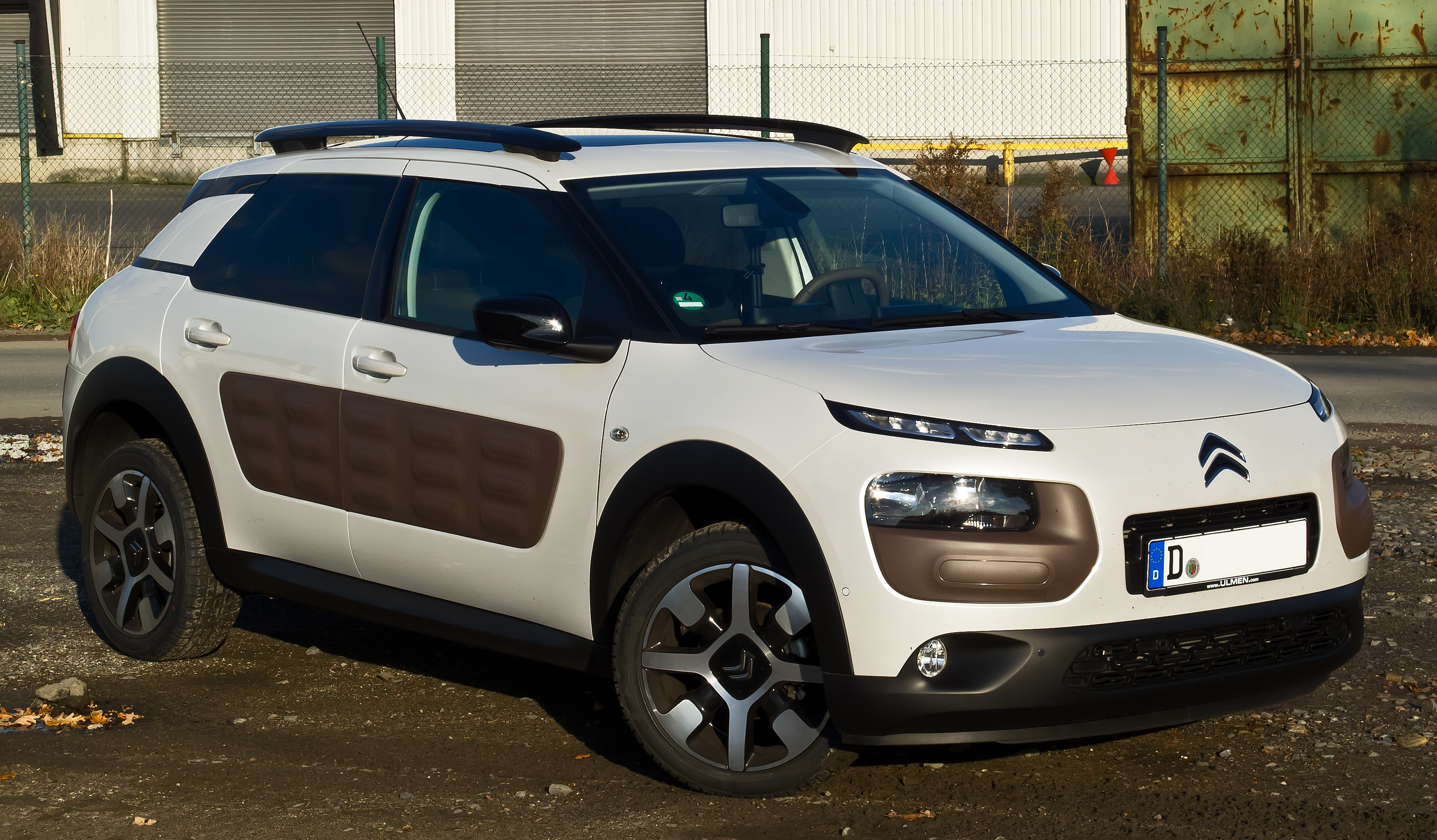
Citroën C4 Cactus, Car of the year in Spain, Denmark, and second at the Car of the year in Europe 2015

Citroën has produced eight Auto Europa winners in 28 years, since 1987. Auto Europa is the prize awarded by the jury of the Italian Union of Automotive Journalists (UIGA), which annually celebrates the best car produced at least at 10,000 units in the 27 countries of the European Union: Citroën XM (1990), Citroën ZX (1992), Citroën Xantia (1994), Citroën Xsara Picasso (2001), Citroën C5 (2002), Citroën C3 (2003), Citroën C4 (2005) and Citroën DS4 (2012).

In 2023, Citroën won the 'Sustainability Initiative Award' of the year at the Auto Trader New Cars Awards 2023.

== Motorsport ==
Citroën Racing, previously known as Citroën Sport and before that as Citroën Competitions, is the division responsible for Citroën's own sporting activities. It is a successful winning competitor in the World Rally Championship and in the World Touring Car Championship.

In 2019, Citroën announced its withdrawal from the World Rally Championship (WRC).

=== Early rally wins for Citroën vehicles ===
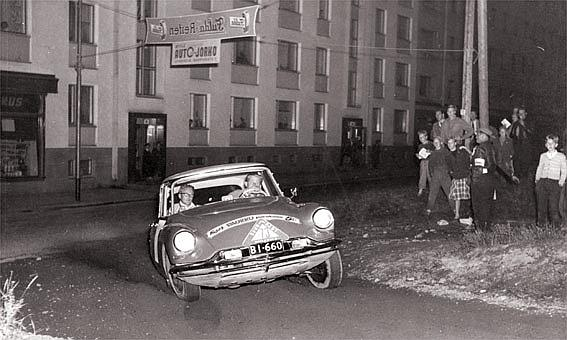
1956 Citroën DS at Rally Finland/1000 Lakes Rally

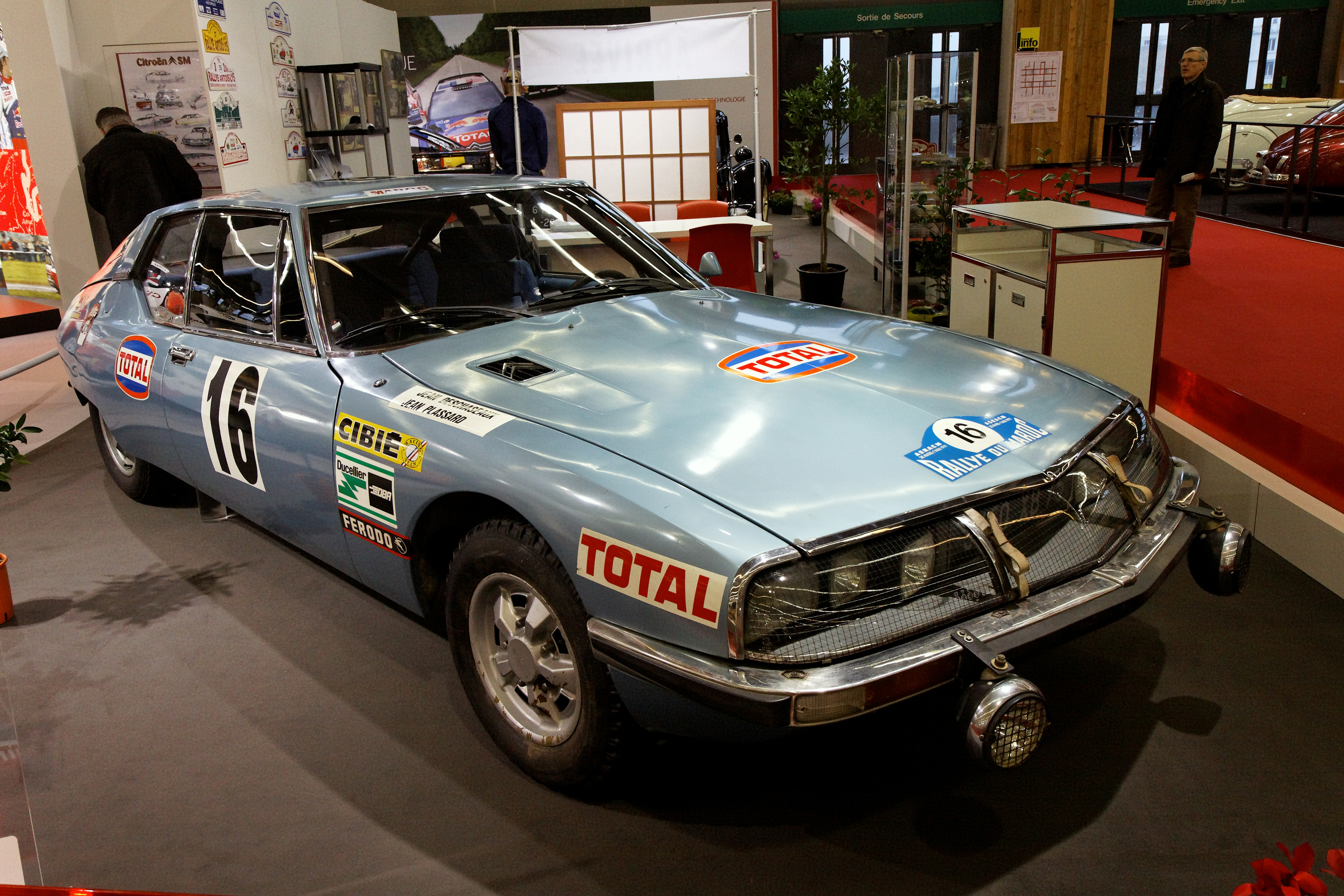
1971 Citroën SM that won Rallye du Maroc

Citroën vehicles were entered in endurance rally driving events beginning in 1956, with the introduction of the DS. The brand was successful and won many key events over a decades long period, with what was essentially the same production car design.

Year	Rally	Winning car
1959	(Monaco) Monte Carlo Rally	Citroën DS
1961	(France) Tour de Corse	Citroën DS
1962	Rally Finland	Citroën DS
1963	(France) Tour de Corse	Citroën DS
1966	(Monaco) Monte Carlo Rally	Citroën DS
1969	Rally de Portugal	Citroën DS
1969	(Morocco) Rallye du Maroc	Citroën DS
1970	(Morocco) Rallye du Maroc	Citroën DS
1971	(Morocco) Rallye du Maroc	Citroën SM
1974	(United Kingdom) 1974 London-Sahara-Munich World Cup Rally	Citroën DS (privately entered)

=== Racing the 2CV ===
Citroën discovered that while racing the uniquely slow 2CV against other cars made little sense, they could be interesting to watch racing against each other. Citroën Competitions sponsored three long distance competitions – Paris-Kaboul-Paris in 1970, Paris-Persepolis-Paris in 1972, and Raid Afrique in 1973.

Enthusiasts carried on the tradition with 2CV Cross – a group of 2CV's racing around a dirt track – a sport that continues today.

=== Rebuilding the competition group ===
The Citroën Competitions division was impacted negatively by the firm's 1974 bankruptcy.

Competitive rallying was also changing – away from standard production cars to specially developed low volume models. In response to the entry of the competitive short wheel base Group B 4 wheel drive Audi Quattro into rallying, Citroën developed the heavily modified Group B Citroën BX 4TC in 1986.

The team returned successfully with the Citroën ZX Rally Raid to win the Rally Raid Manufacturer's Championship five times (1993, 1994, 1995, 1996, and 1997) with Pierre Lartigue and Ari Vatanen. Citroën Racing won the Dakar Rally four times, in 1991, continuing the serial of four victories of Peugeot sport, and then again in 1994, 1995, and 1996.

From 2001, the Citroën Racing team returned successfully to the World Rally Championship, winning eight times the Manufacturer's Title, continuing the serial of three WRC Championships victories of Peugeot sport, in 2003, 2004, 2005, 2008, 2009, 2010, 2011 and 2012. The Citroën WRC Team pilot Sébastien Loeb also won nine Drivers' Championships. In 2004, 2005, and 2006, the French pilot won the Drivers' Championship, driving the Citroën Xsara WRC, in 2007, 2008, 2009 and 2010 with the Citroën C4 WRC, and in 2011 and 2012 with the new Citroën DS3 WRC.

The Citroën World Rally Team has a record of 97 victories in the World Rally Championship.

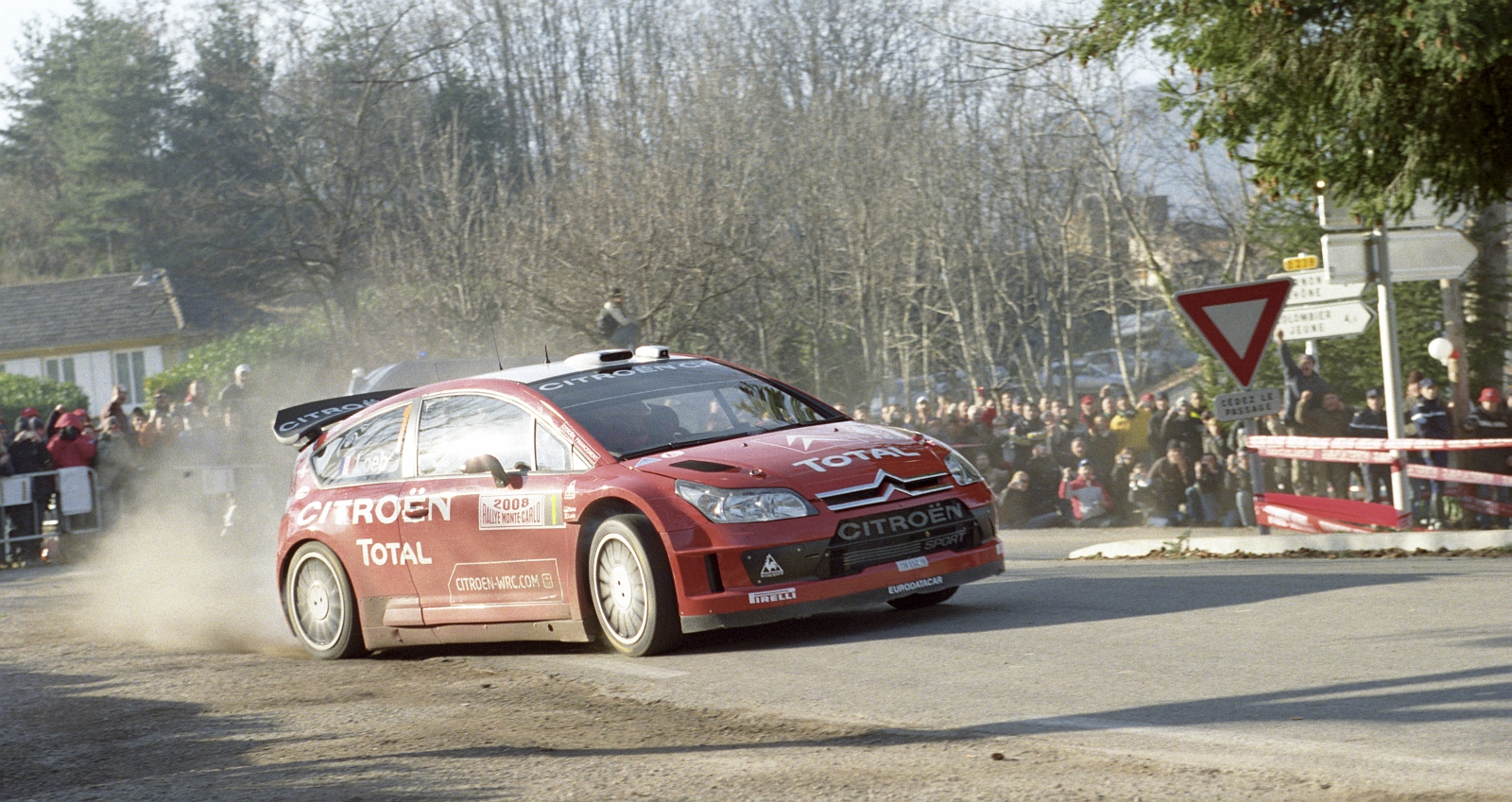
Sébastien Loeb with his Citroën C4 at the 2008 Monte Carlo Rally

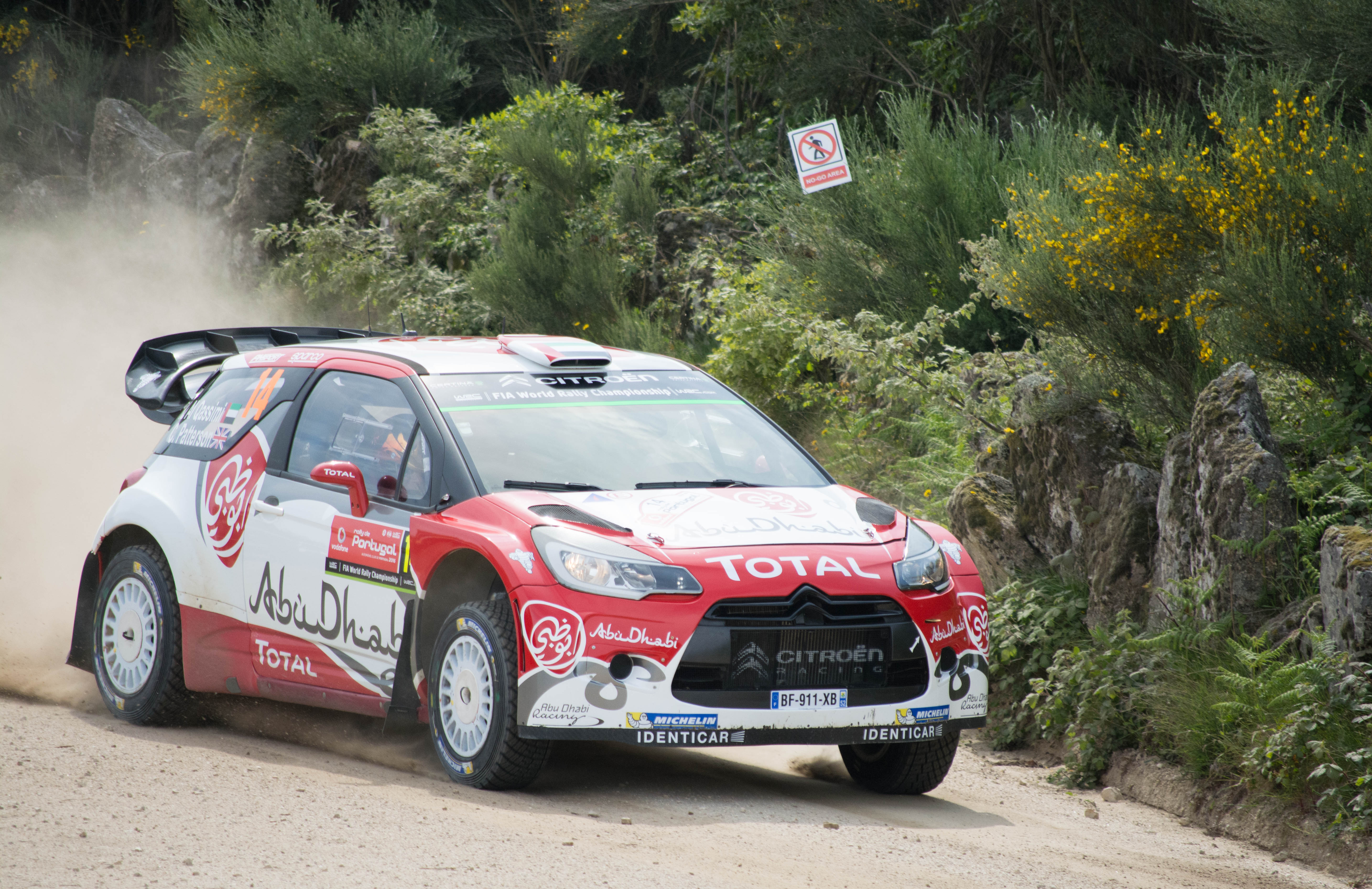
Khalid Al-Qassimi with his Citroën DS3 WRC at the 2016 Rally de Portugal

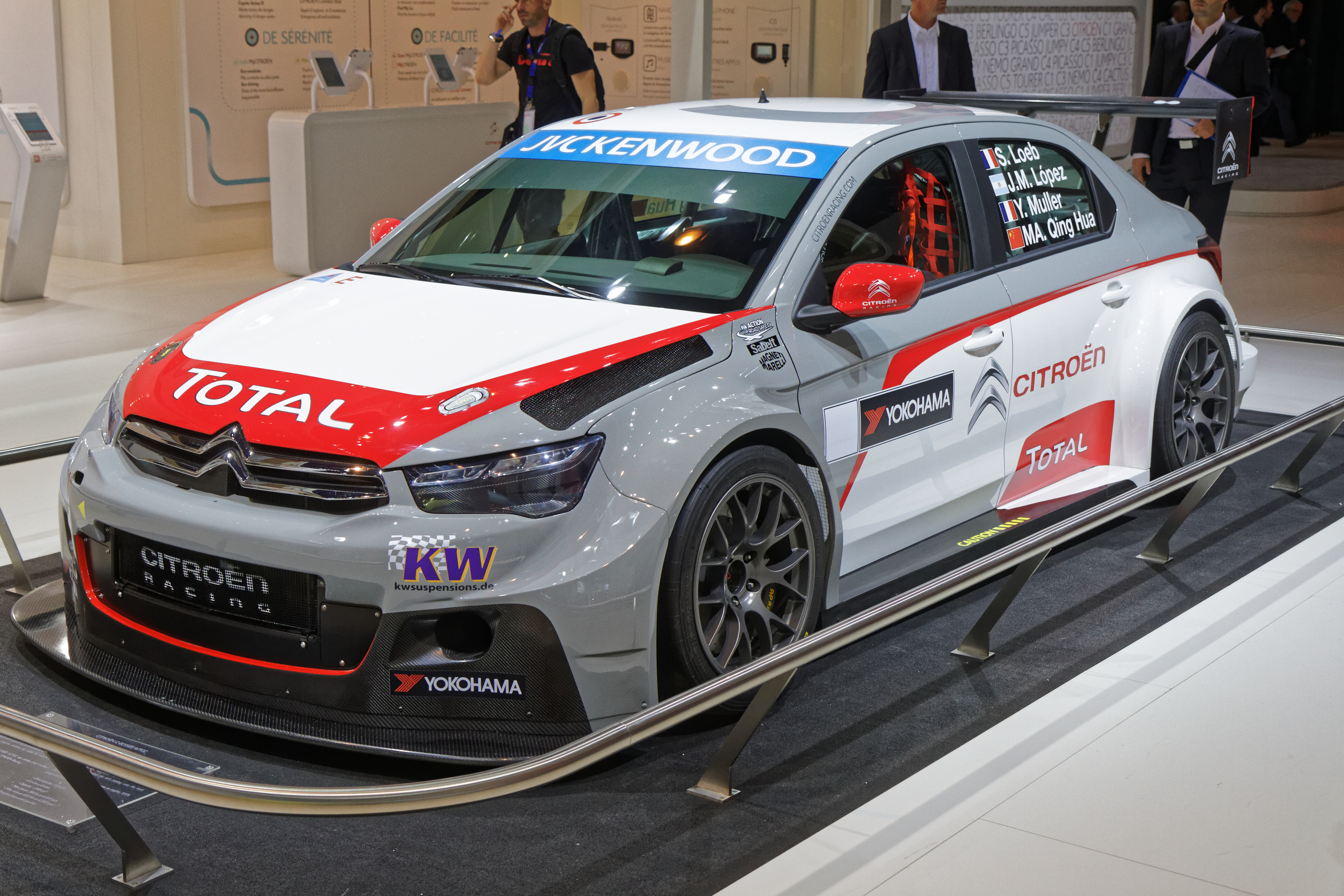
Citroën C-Elysée WTCC on display

=== New competition division for touring cars ===
In 2012, Citroën announced plans to enter the World Touring Car Championship. The team transformed a DS3 WRC into a laboratory vehicle to help with early development, while the engine was an evolution of their WRC engine which had been used in the WRC since 2011. Citroën started developing the car for the new TC1 regulations, which were brought forward a year early in 2014 to expedite the entry of Citroën into the championship. The introduction of the new regulations a year earlier than planned gave a seven-month development headstart to Citroën over the other manufacturers. This large development advantage combined with a big budget and a strong driver line-up made Citroën the clear favourite going into the first season of the new regulations in 2014. Citroën would go on to win most of the races that season as well as the manufacturers' title, while José María López won the drivers' title. The team would repeat this feat in 2015 and 2016, before the factory team left the series at the end of 2016. A number of Citroëns were still raced by other teams in 2017, but were outpaced by the Hondas and the Volvos.

=== Formula E ===
On 12/09/2025 Citroën announced its return to the international scene at the highest level by entering the Formula E championship from the 2025/26 season

== Concept cars ==
Citroën has produced numerous concept cars over the decades, previewing future design trends or technologies. Notable concepts include the Citroën Karin (1980), Citroën Activa (1988), Citroën C-Métisse (2006), GT by Citroën (2008) and Citroën Survolt (2010).

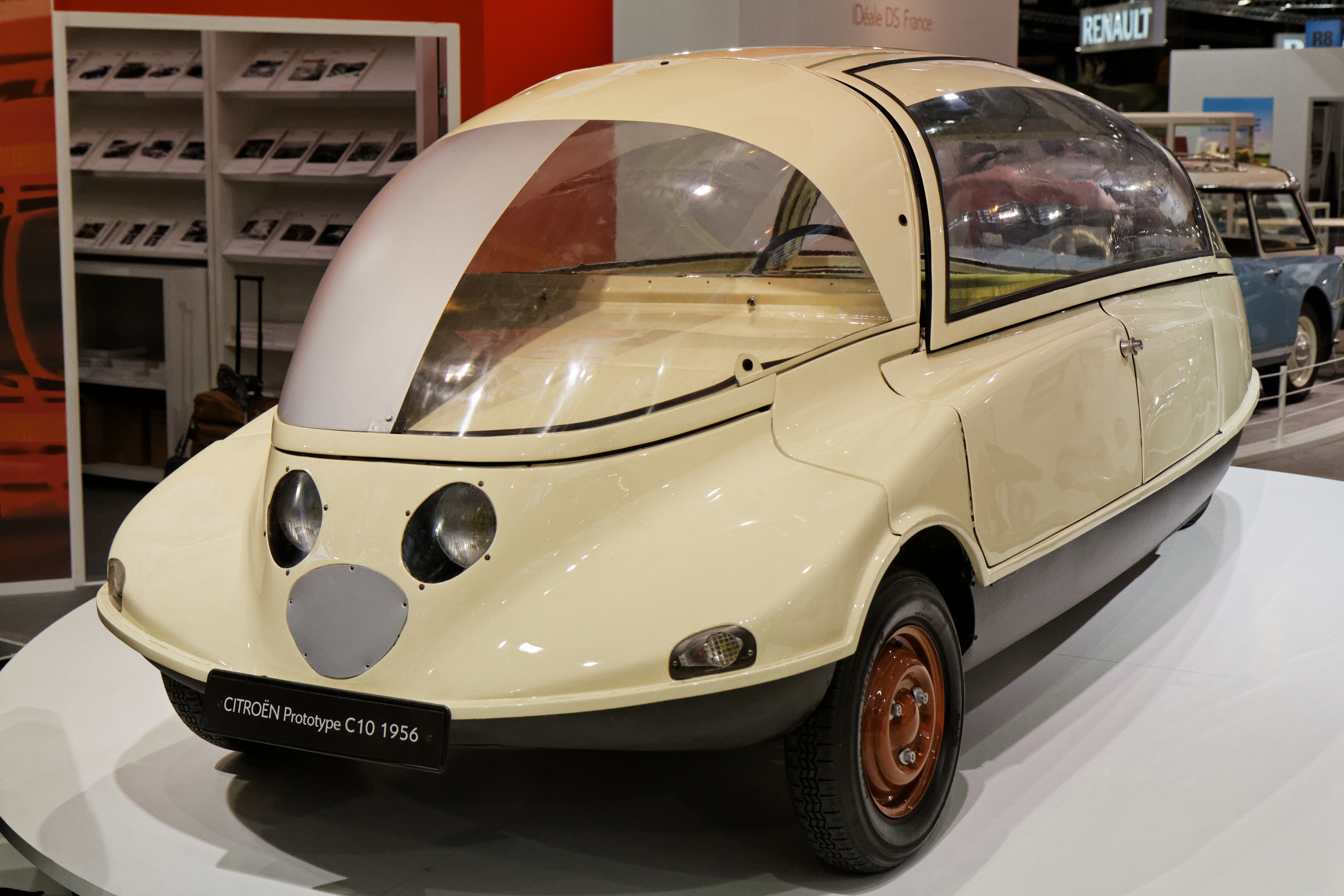
Citroën C-10 (1955)

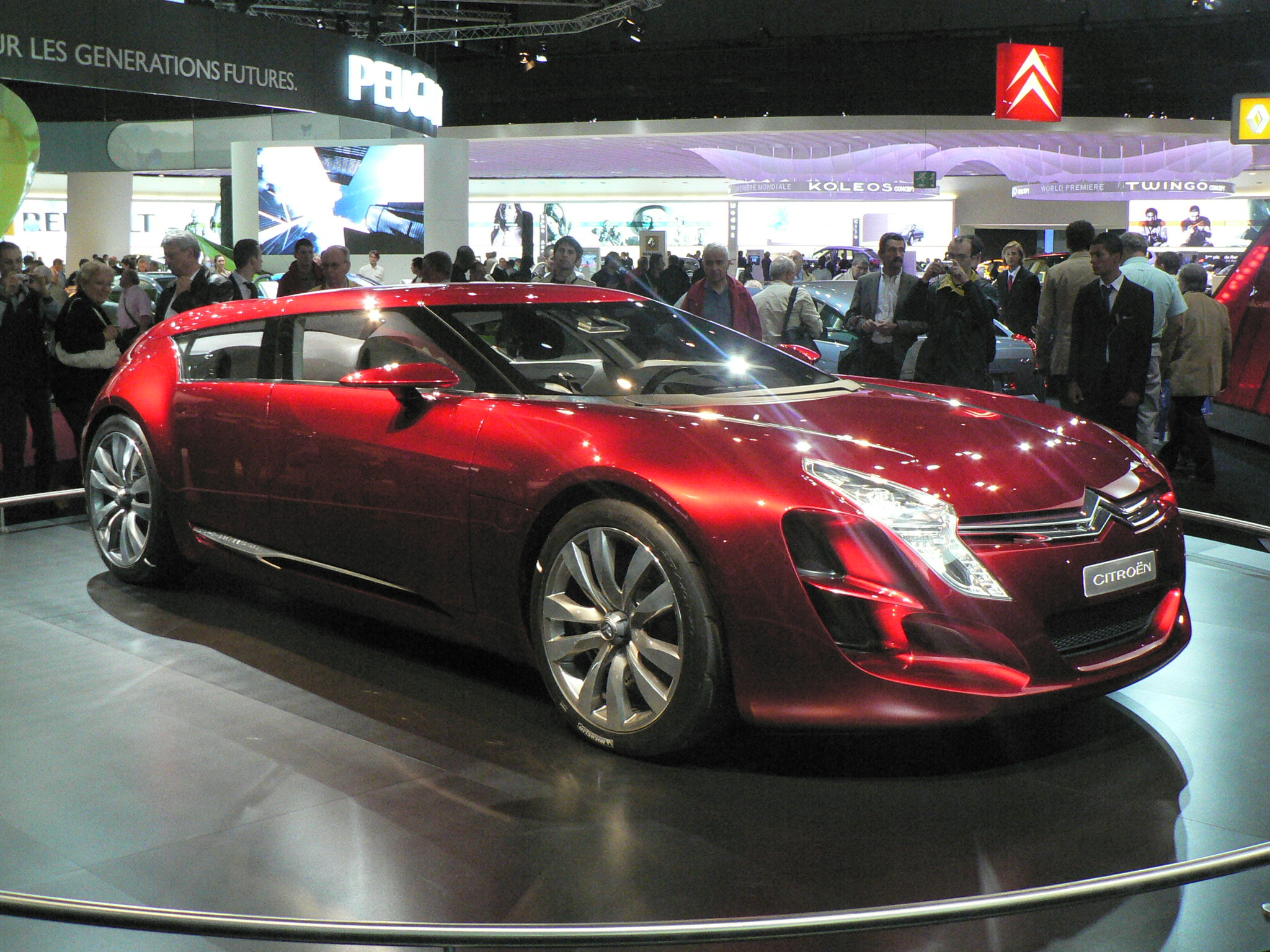
Citroën C-Métisse (2006)

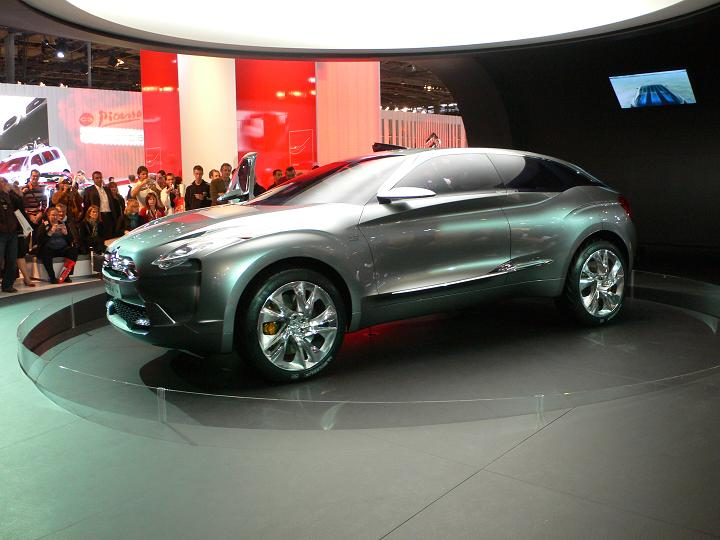
Citroën Hypnos (2008)

== Logo ==
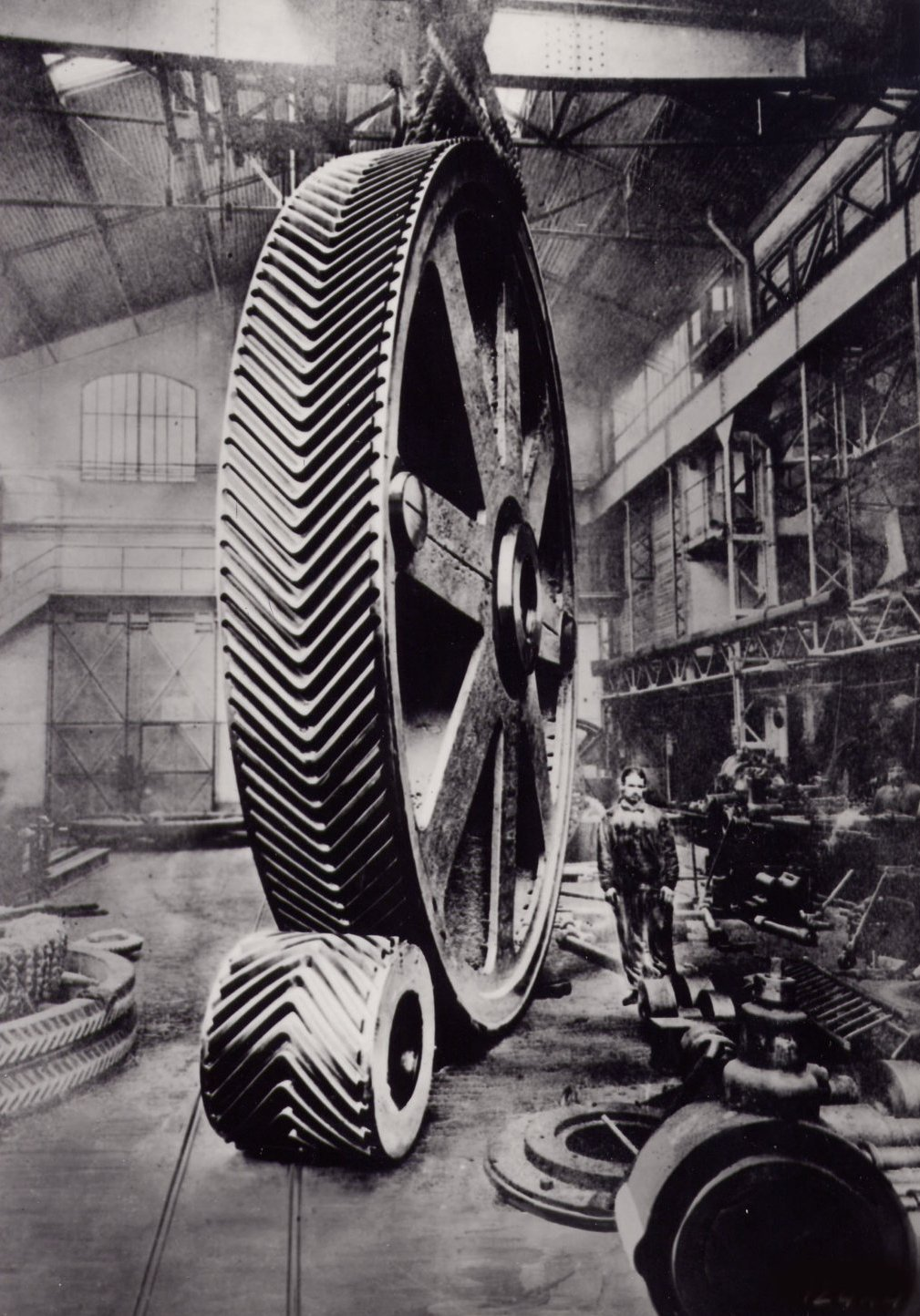
The gears with double chevrons that reputedly were the basis of the Citroën logo

The origin of the logo may be traced back to a trip made by the 22-year-old André Citroën to the city of Łódź in Poland, where he discovered an innovative design for a chevron-shaped gear used in milling. He bought the patent for its application in steel. Mechanically a gear with helical teeth produces an axial force. By adding a second helical gear in opposition, this force is cancelled. The two chevrons of the logo represent the intermeshing contact of the two. Early Citroën cars used a herringbone bevel gear final drive in the rear axle.

The presentation of the logo has evolved over time. Before the war, it was rendered in yellow on a blue background. After the war, the chevrons became more subtle herringbones, usually on a white background. With the company searching for a new image during the 1980s, the logo became white on red to give an impression of dynamism.

On 5 February 2009, Citroën launched a new brand identity to celebrate its 90th anniversary, replacing the 1985 design. The new logo was a 3D metallic variation of the double chevron logo accompanied by a new font for the Citroën name and the new slogan "Créative Technologie". A TV campaign reminiscing over 90 years of Citroën was commissioned to announce the new identity to the public. In October 2016, Citroën released an alternative version of its logo in 2D, adopting the flat design style, which was very popular at the time. In 2022, the brand unveiled a new badge design which is a modern-day representation of its original 1919 logo, returning the oval shape to the two chevrons.

=== Logo evolution ===
Citroën logos through the history:

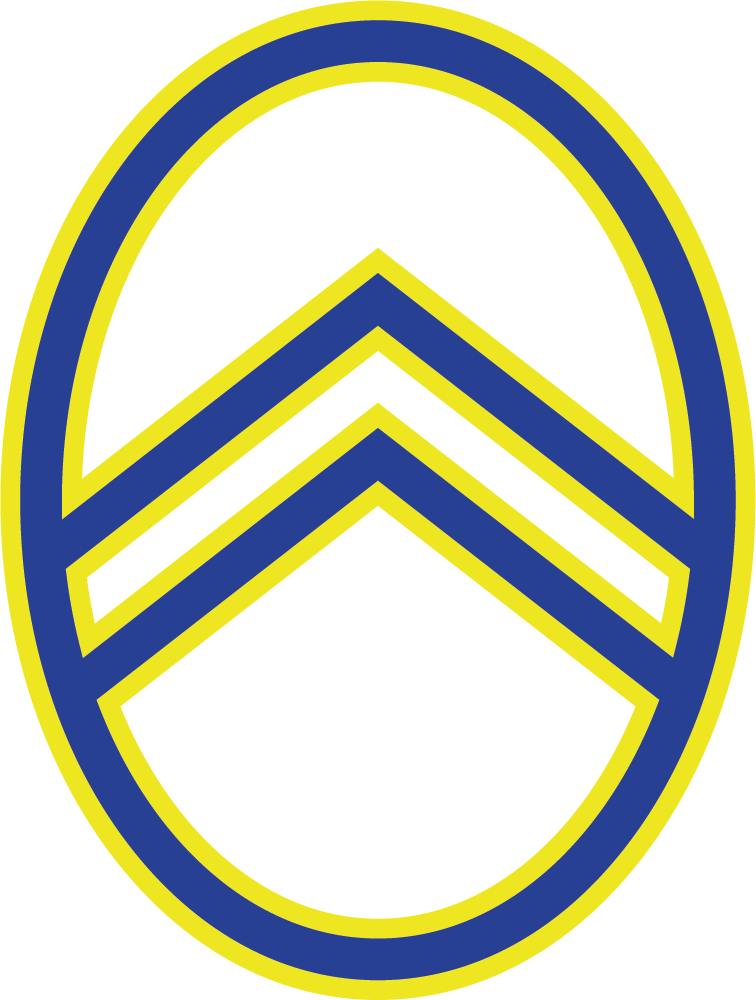
1919–1921

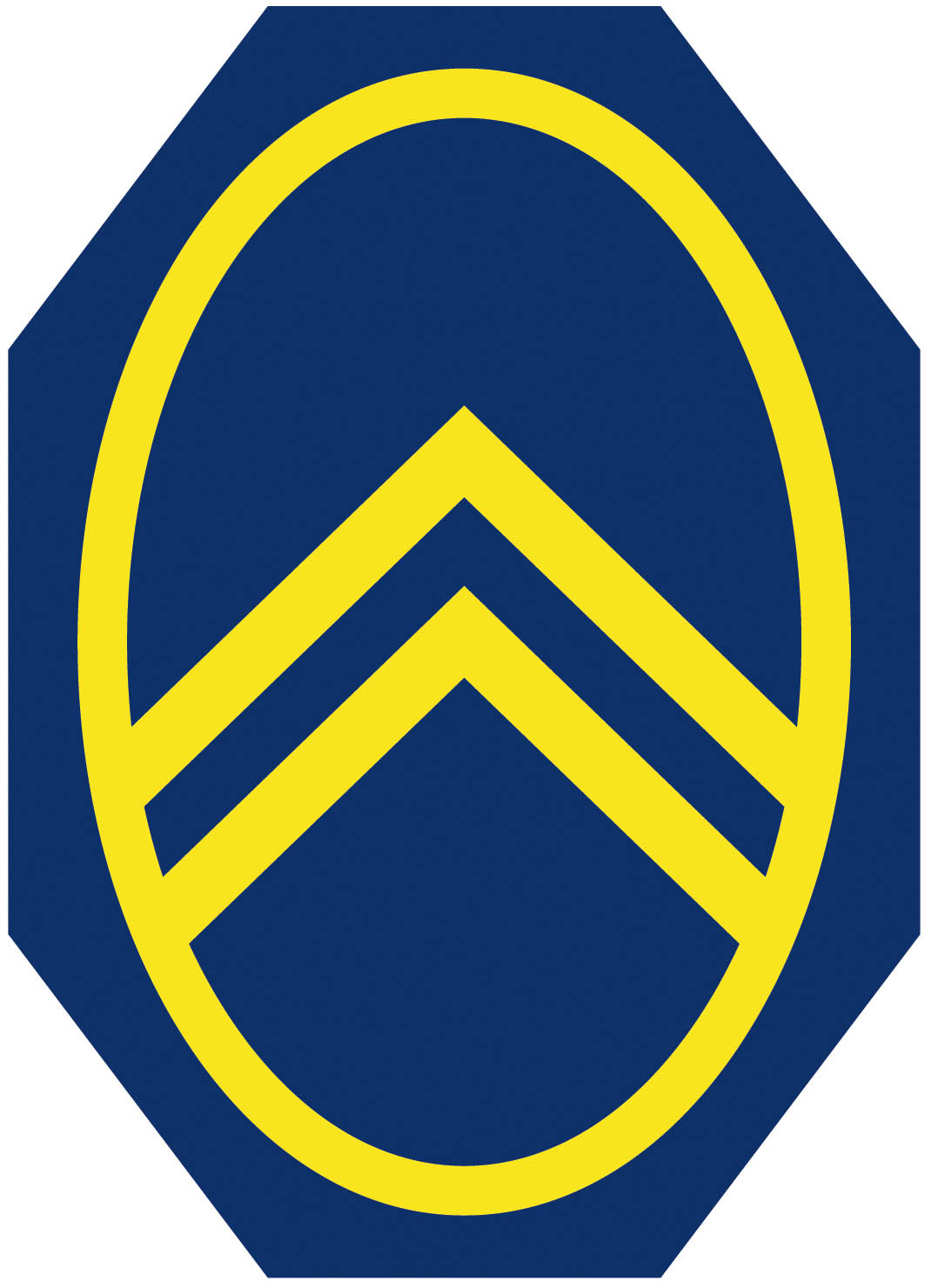
1921–1932

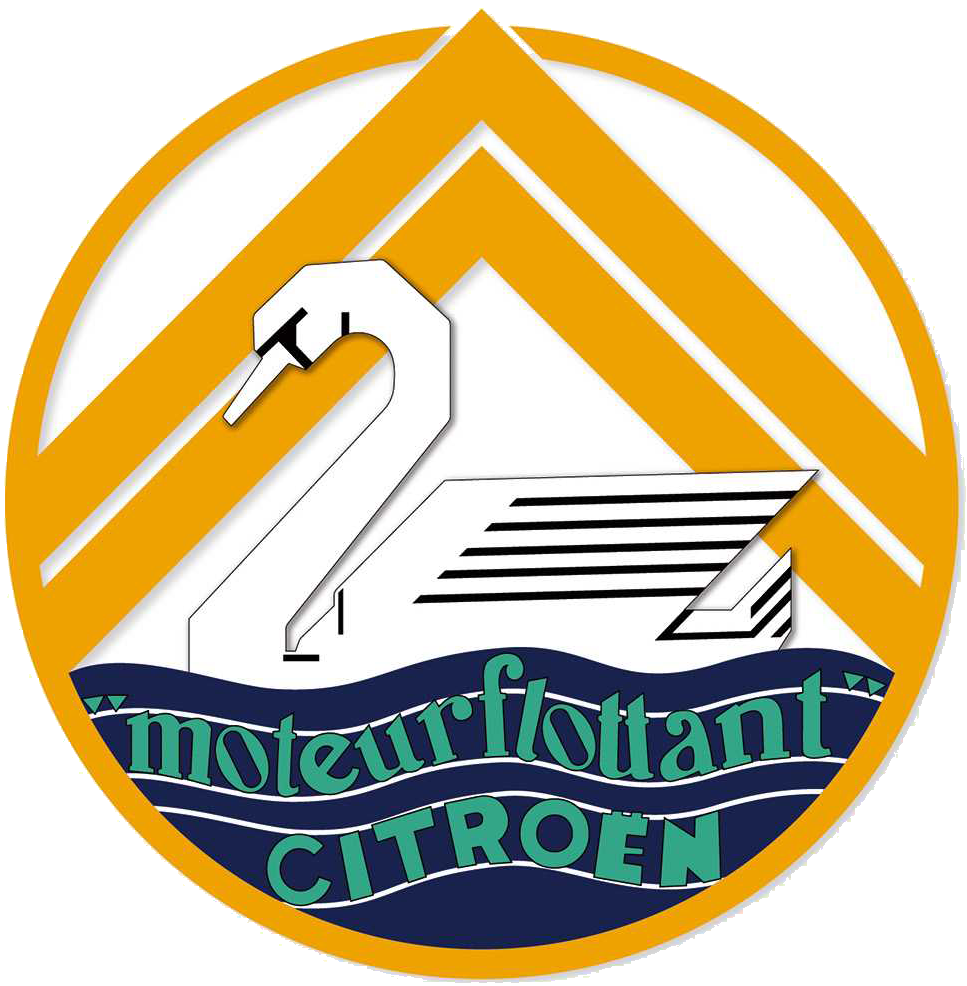
1932–1936

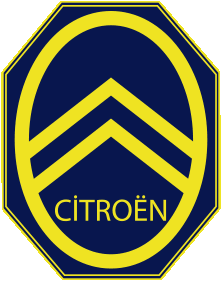
1936–1959

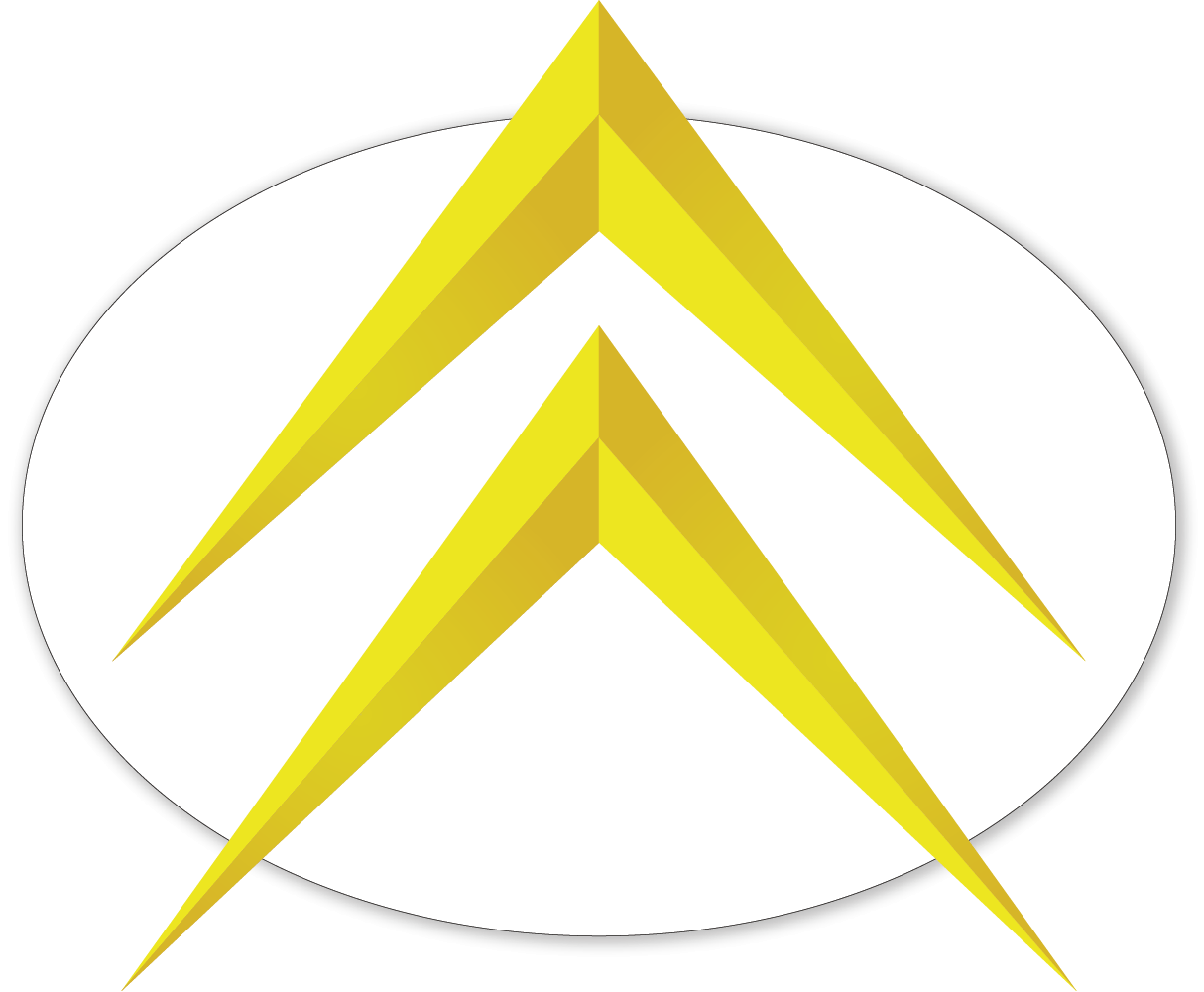
1959–1966

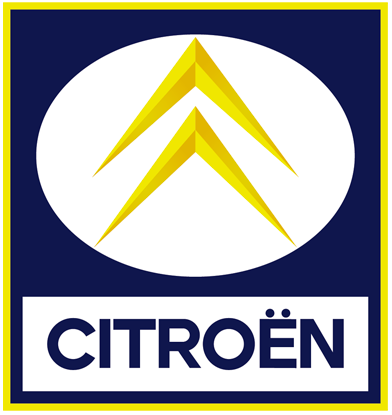
1966–1985

1985–2009

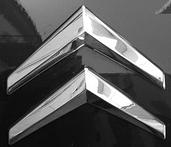
2005–2012 (badge)

2009–2016

2016–2022

2021–2022 (alternative logo)

2022–present

== Factories ==
- Argentina (El Palomar): C4 Lounge (2013–2021), Berlingo
- Brazil (Porto Real): C4 Cactus, C3
- France (Mulhouse): DS 4 (2010–2018), DS 7
- France (Poissy): DS 3
- France (Rennes): C5 Aircross
- France (Sochaux): DS 5 (2011-2018)
- Portugal (Mangualde): Berlingo
- Serbia (Kragujevac): C3
- Slovakia (Trnava): C3
- Spain (Madrid): C4 Cactus
- Spain (Opel Zaragoza): C3 Aircross
- Spain (Vigo): Berlingo First, Berlingo, Xsara Picasso, C4 Picasso / C4 Grand Picasso, C-Elysee
- Turkey (Tofaş Bursa): Nemo (2007-2017)

Some joint venture models are manufactured in third party or joint venture factories, including the following:

- China (Shenzhen), Chang'an PSA joint venture: DS 5LS and DS 6WR
- China (Wuhan), Dongfeng Peugeot-Citroën Automobile joint venture: C-Elysee, C3 L, Xsara Picasso, C4 L, C5
- Czech Republic (Kolín), Toyota/PSA joint venture: C1
- France (Valenciennes), PSA/Fiat joint venture Sevel Nord: Jumpy/Dispatch
- India (Tiruvallur), PSA/CK Birla Group joint venture: C3, C3 Aircross, C5 Aircross, Basalt
- Italy (Val di Sangro), PSA/Fiat joint venture Sevel Sud: Jumper/Relay
- Japan (Mizushima), Mitsubishi Motors plant: C-Zero
- Russia (Kaluga), PSA/Mitsubishi joint venture: C4, C-Crosser
- Iran (Kashan), SAIPA Citroën JV: C3, C3xr, C4
- Turkey (Karsan): Berlingo

== International markets ==
=== Australia ===
Having been present in Australia since 1923, Citroën has been the country's longest continuously-running car manufacturer. However, the brand announced in August 2024 that it would stop taking orders in Australia by 1 November 2024 due to slow sales.

== Current product lineup ==
=== Citroën ===
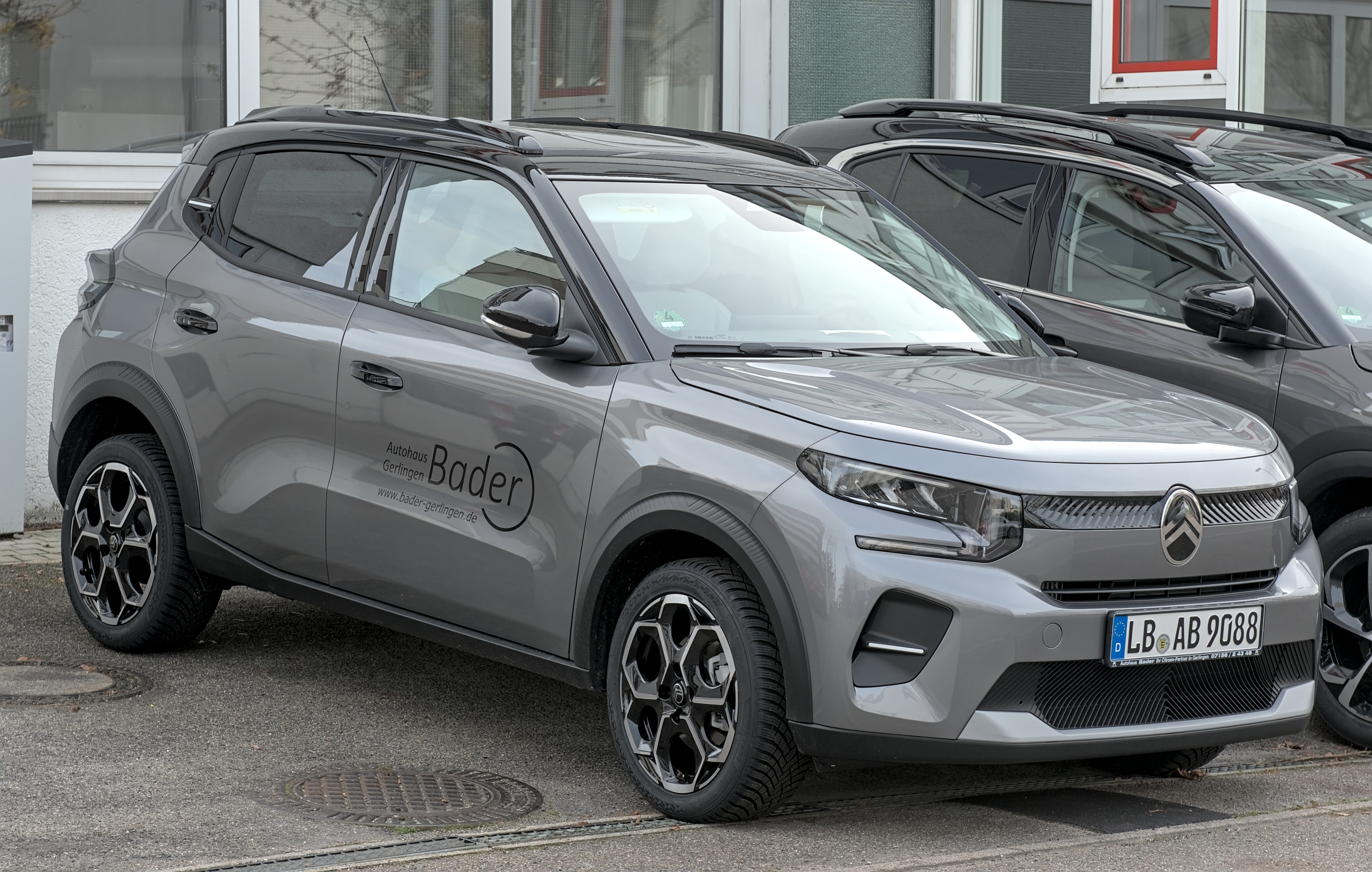
Citroën C3 IV

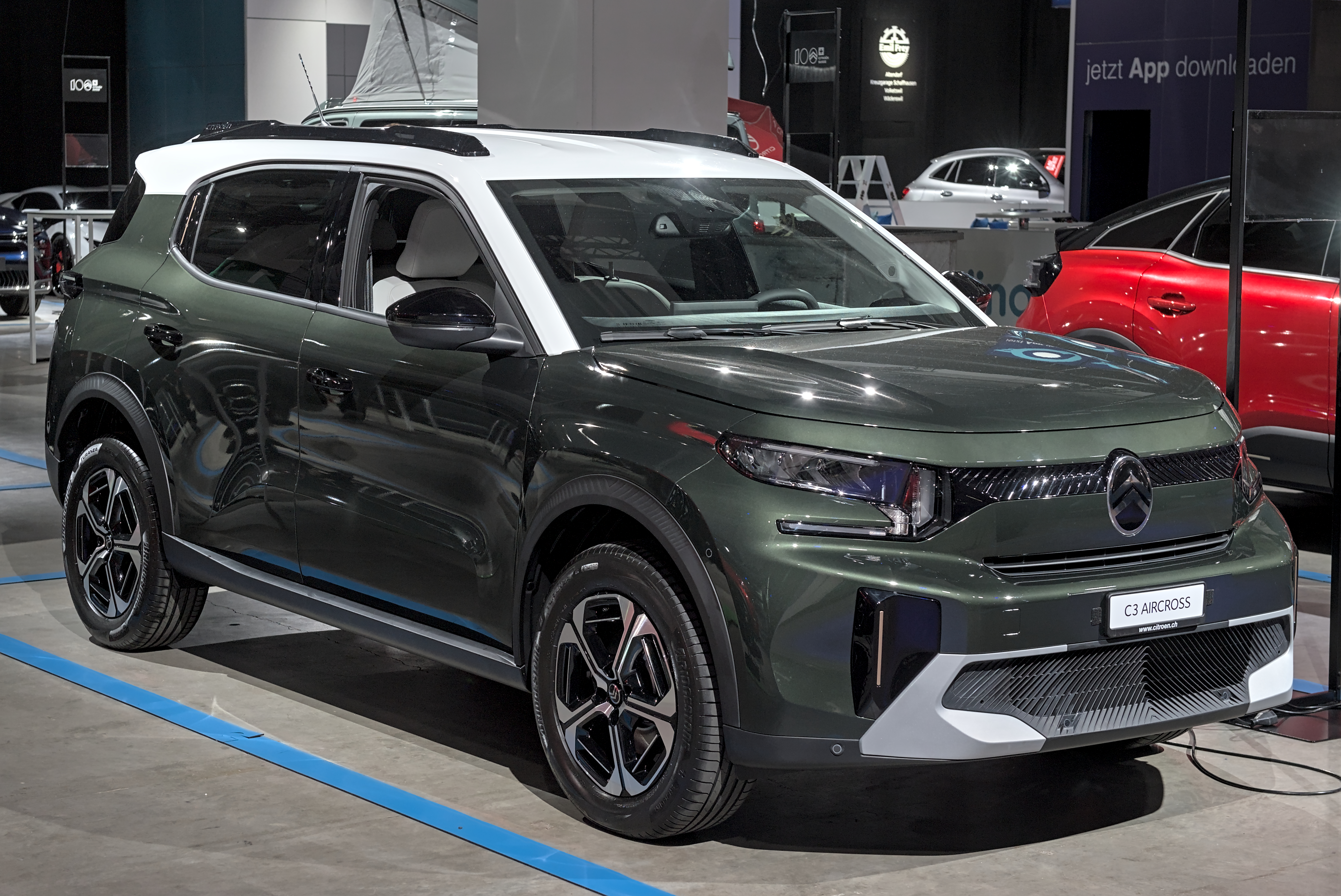
Citroën C3 Aircross III

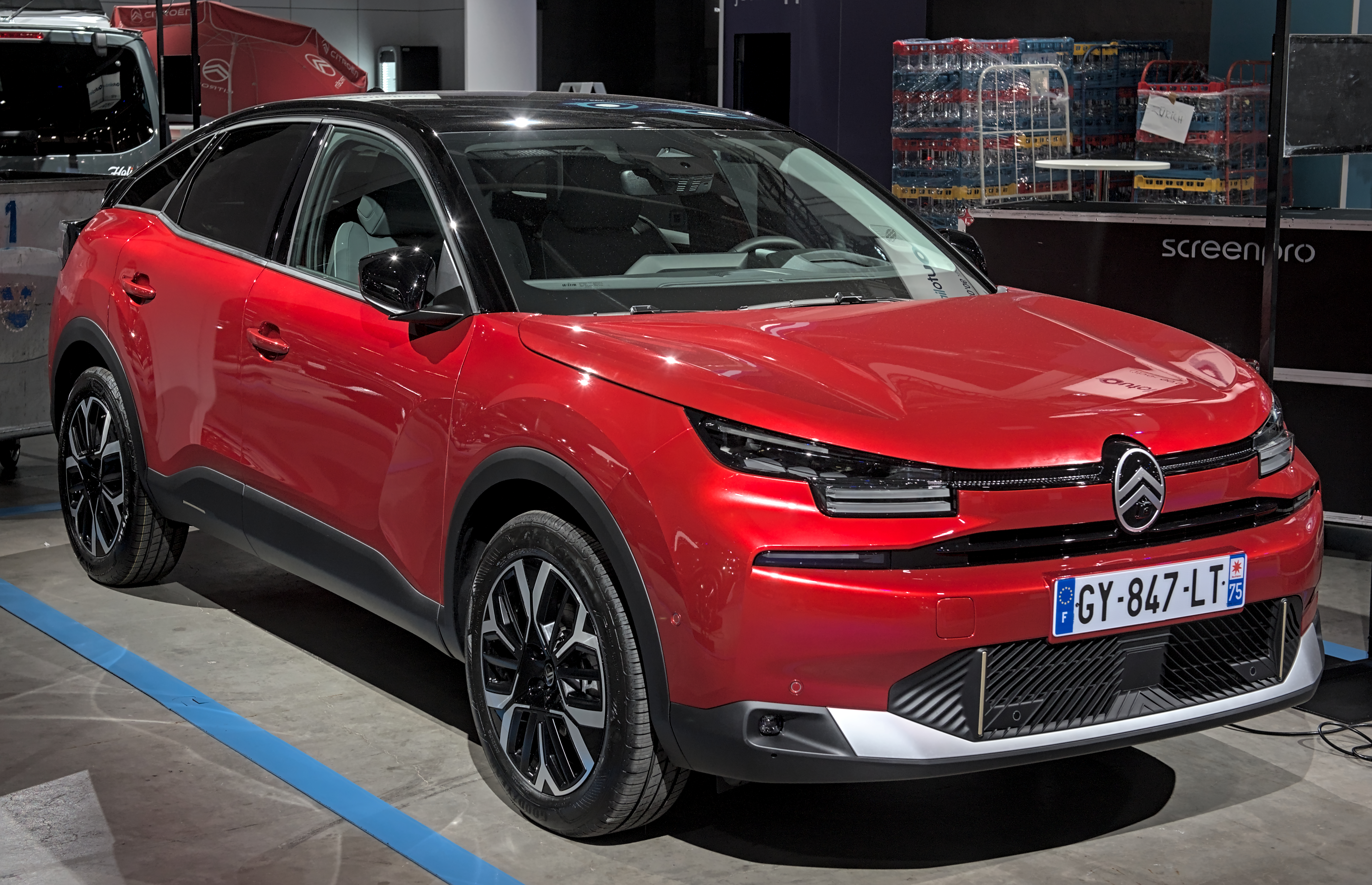
Citroën C4

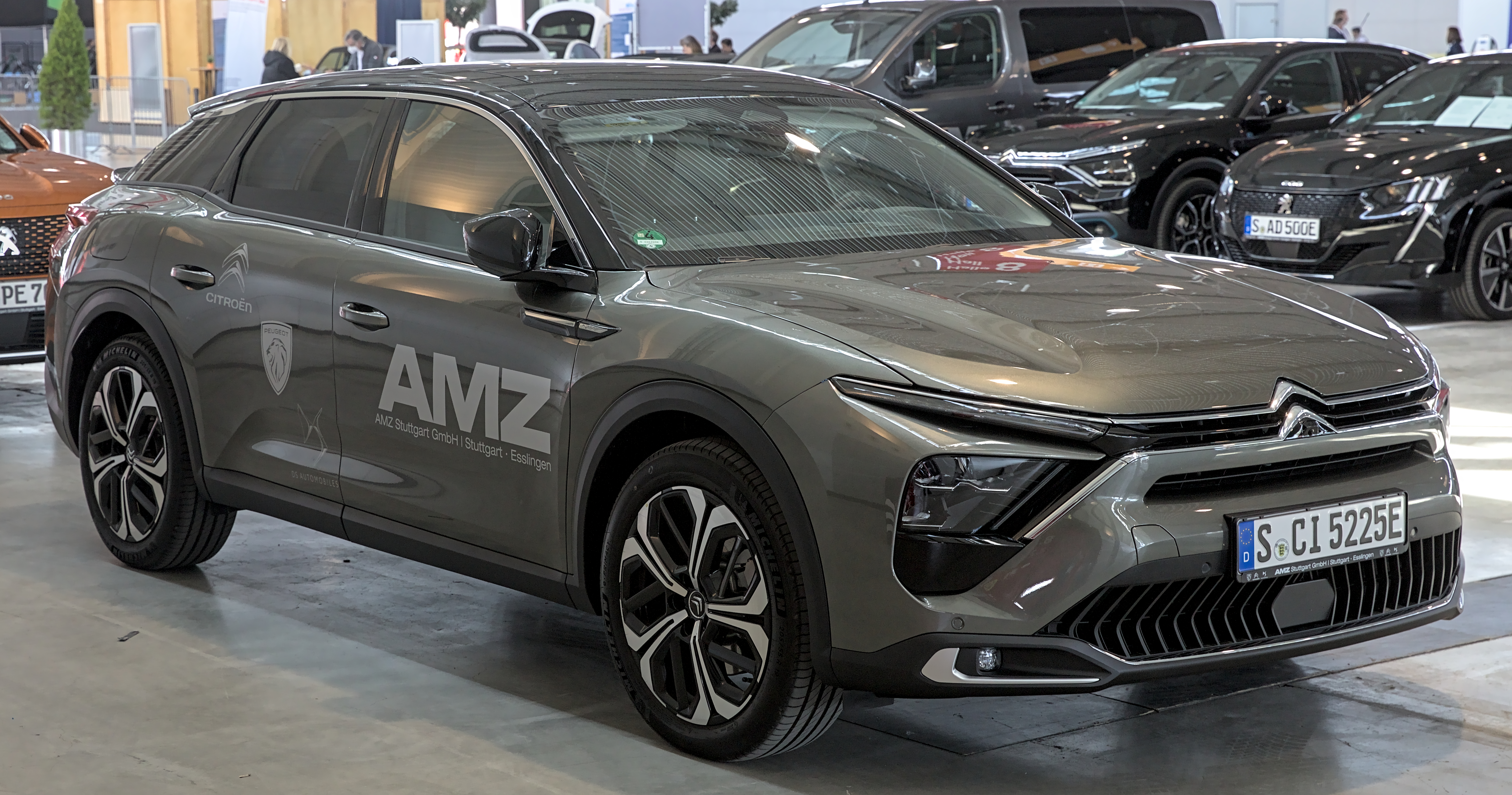
Citroën C5 X

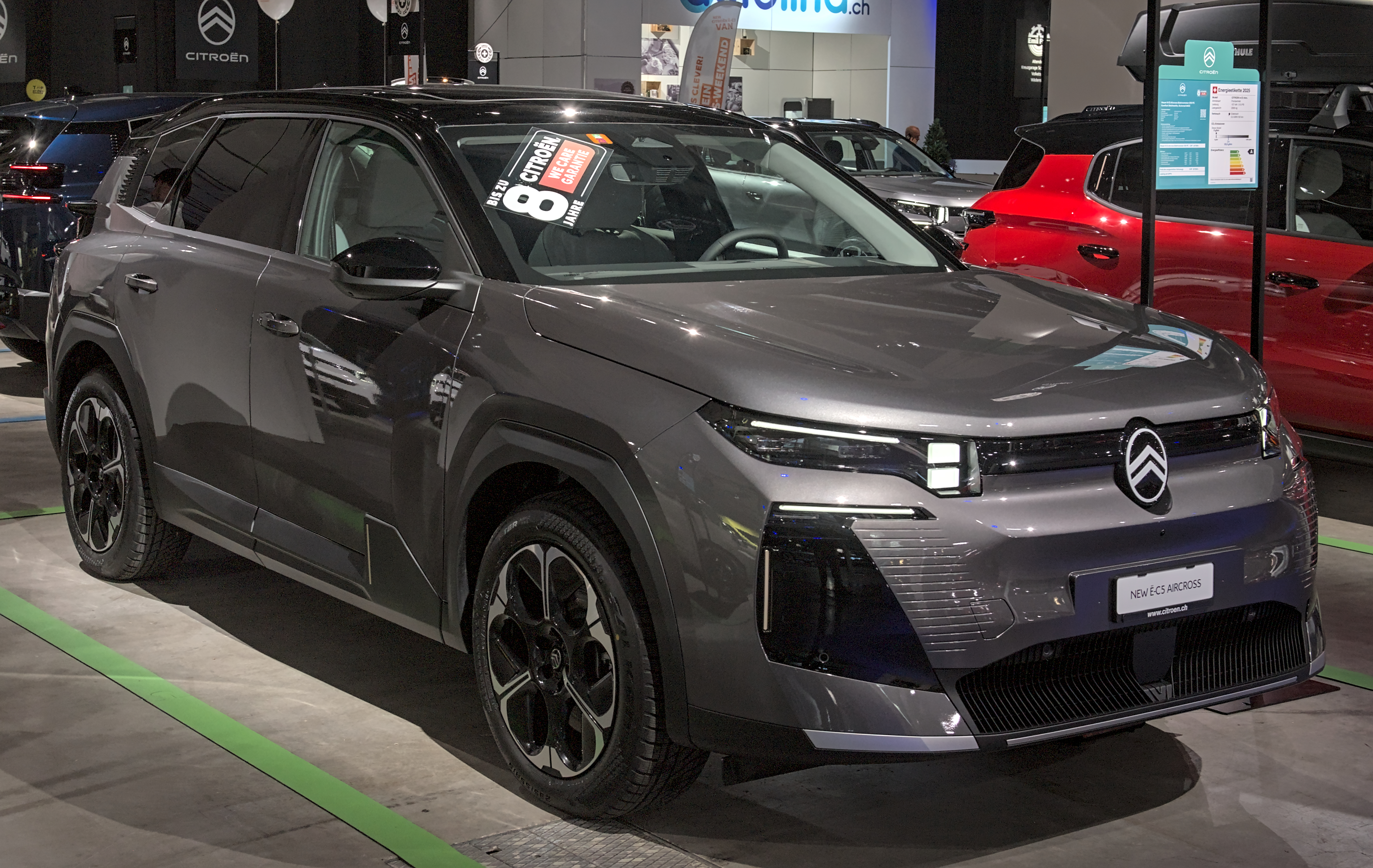
Citroën C5 Aircross

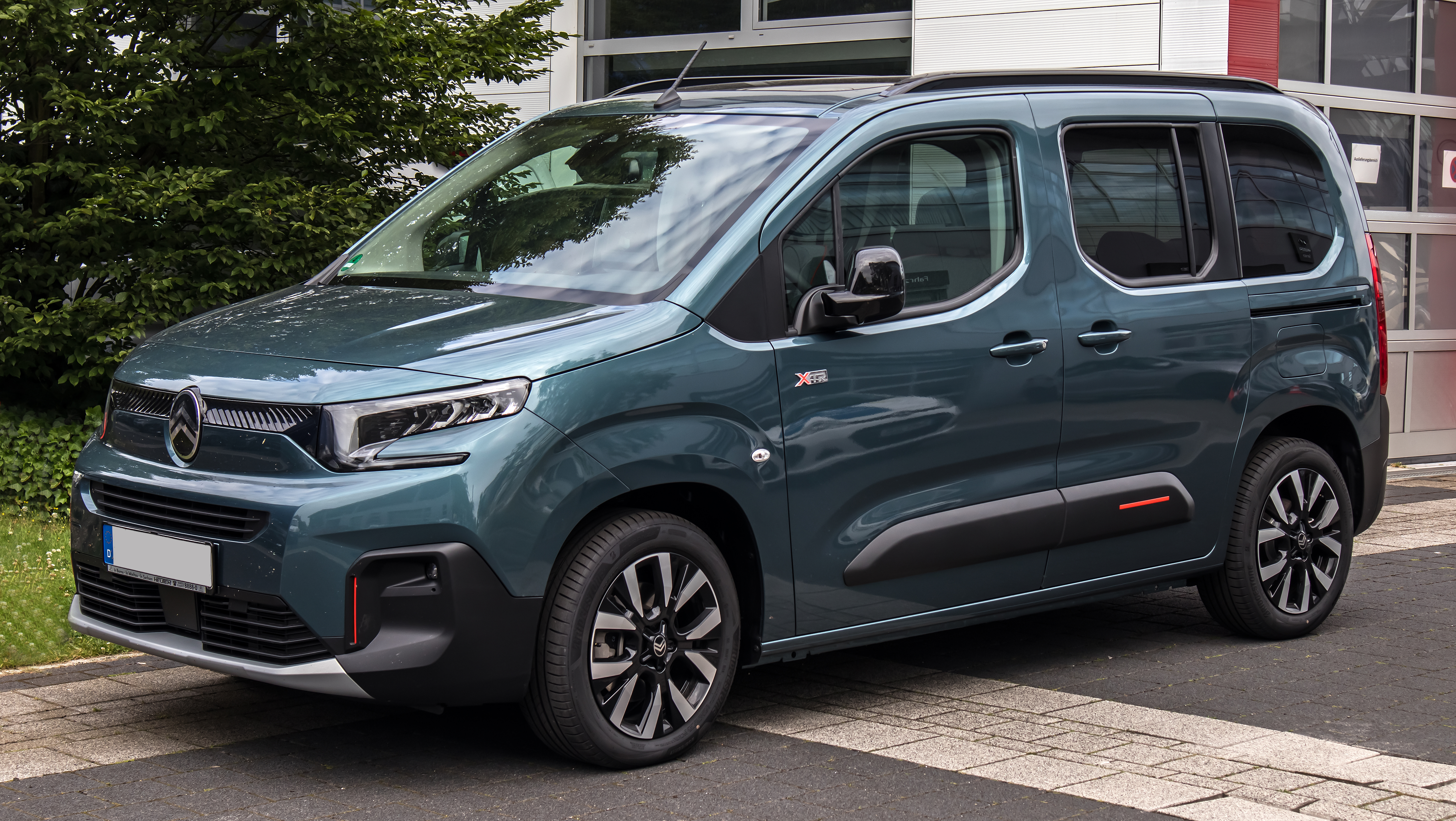
Citroën Berlingo

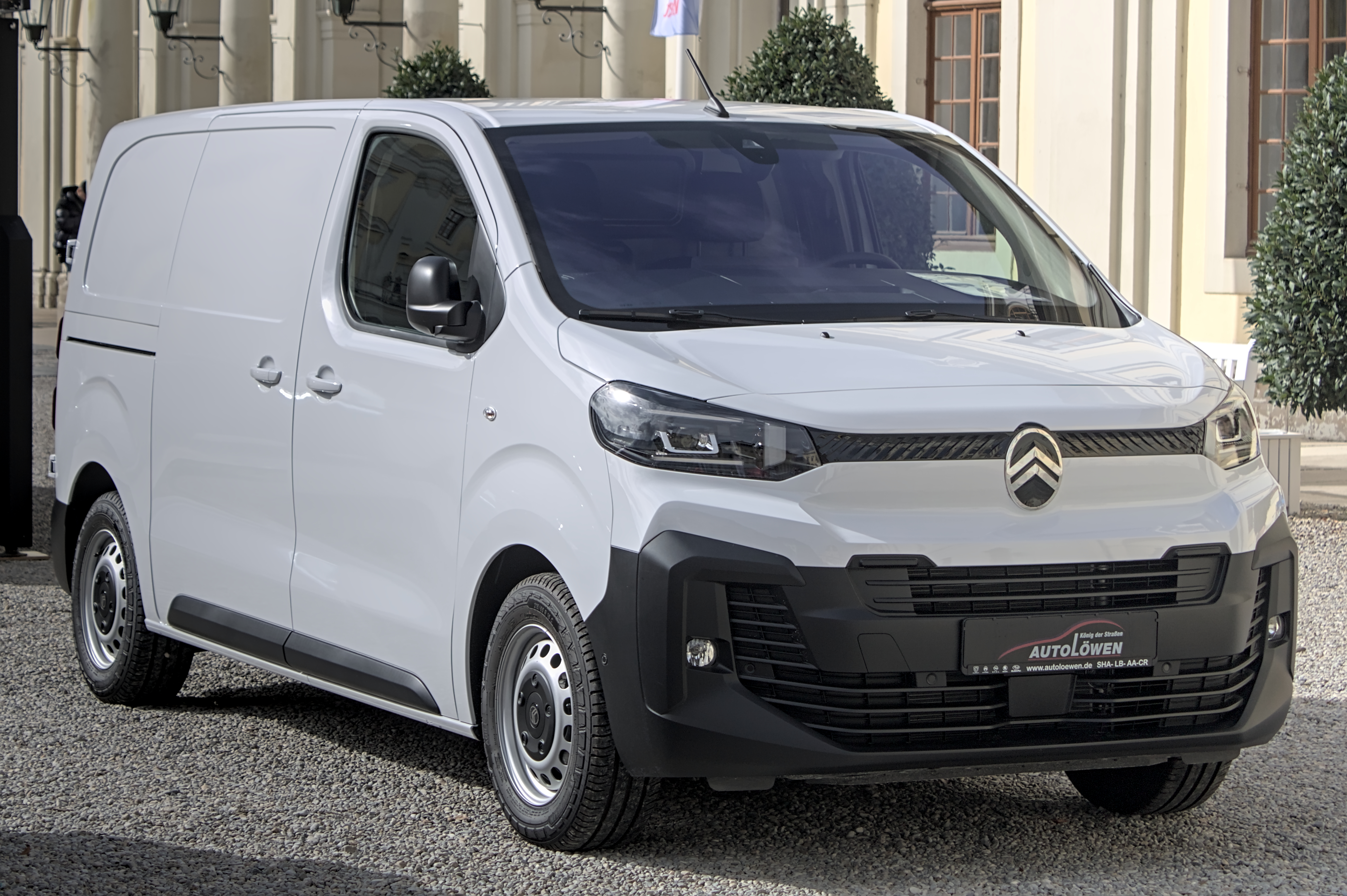
Citroën Jumpy

=== DS line ===
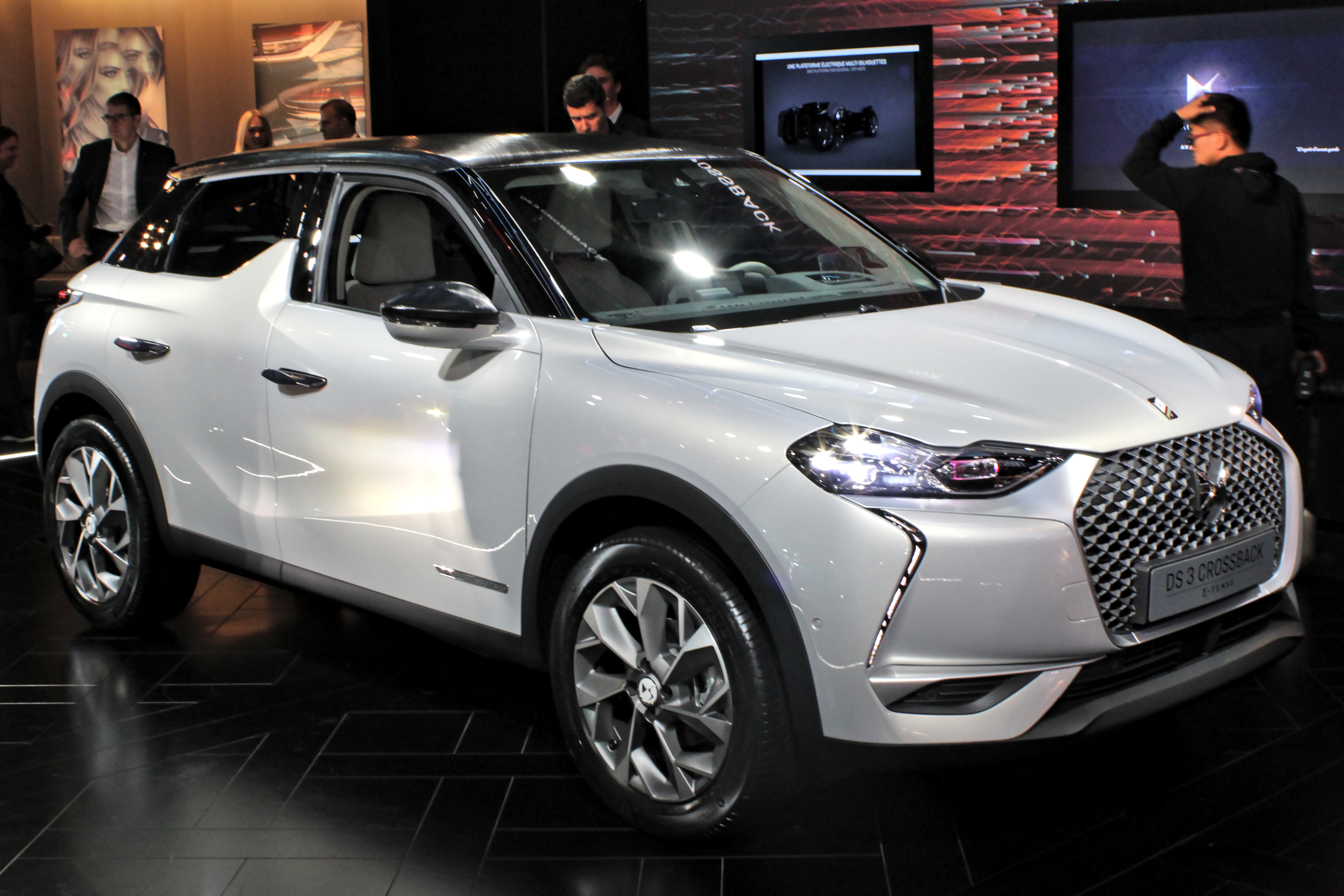
DS 3

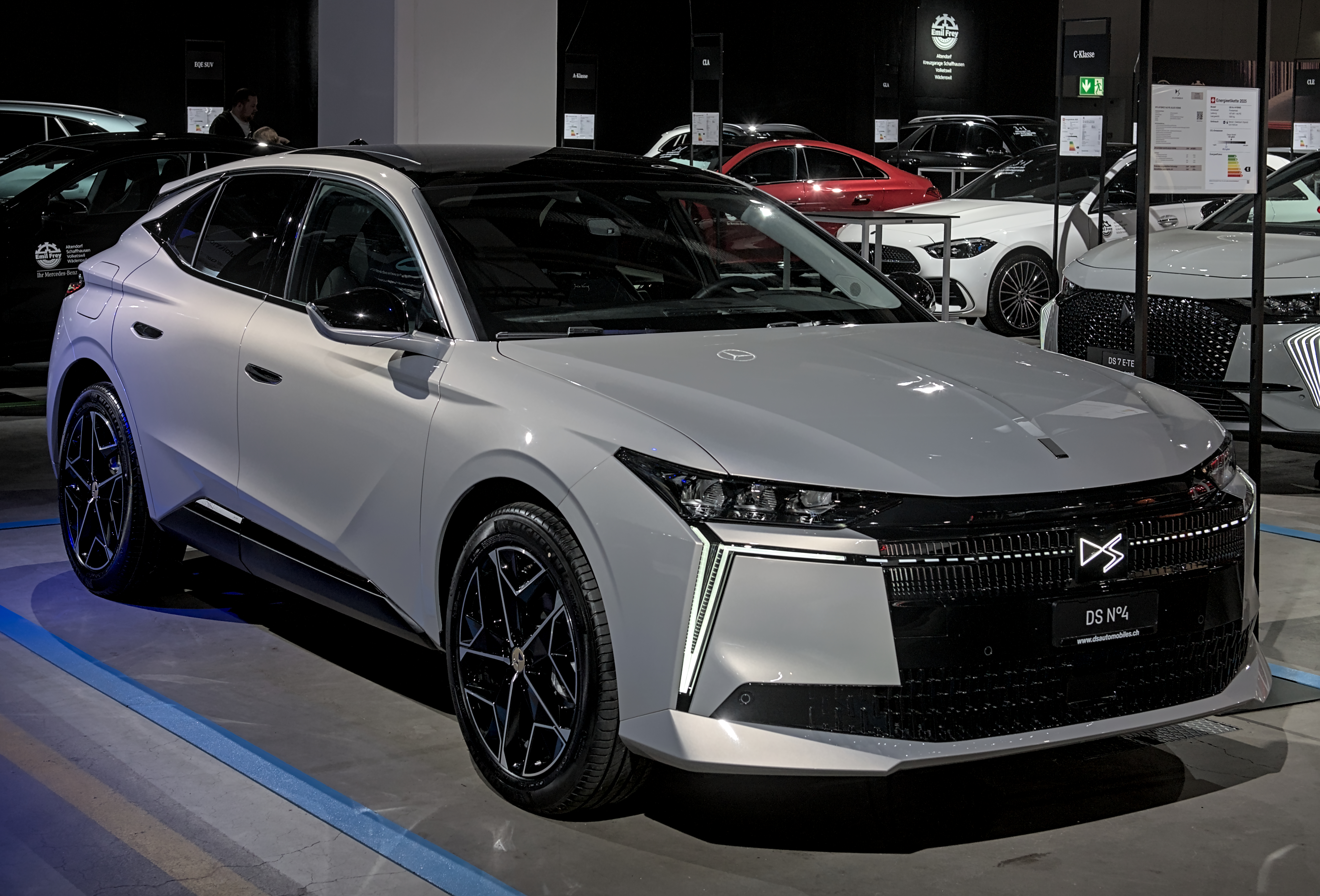
DS N°4

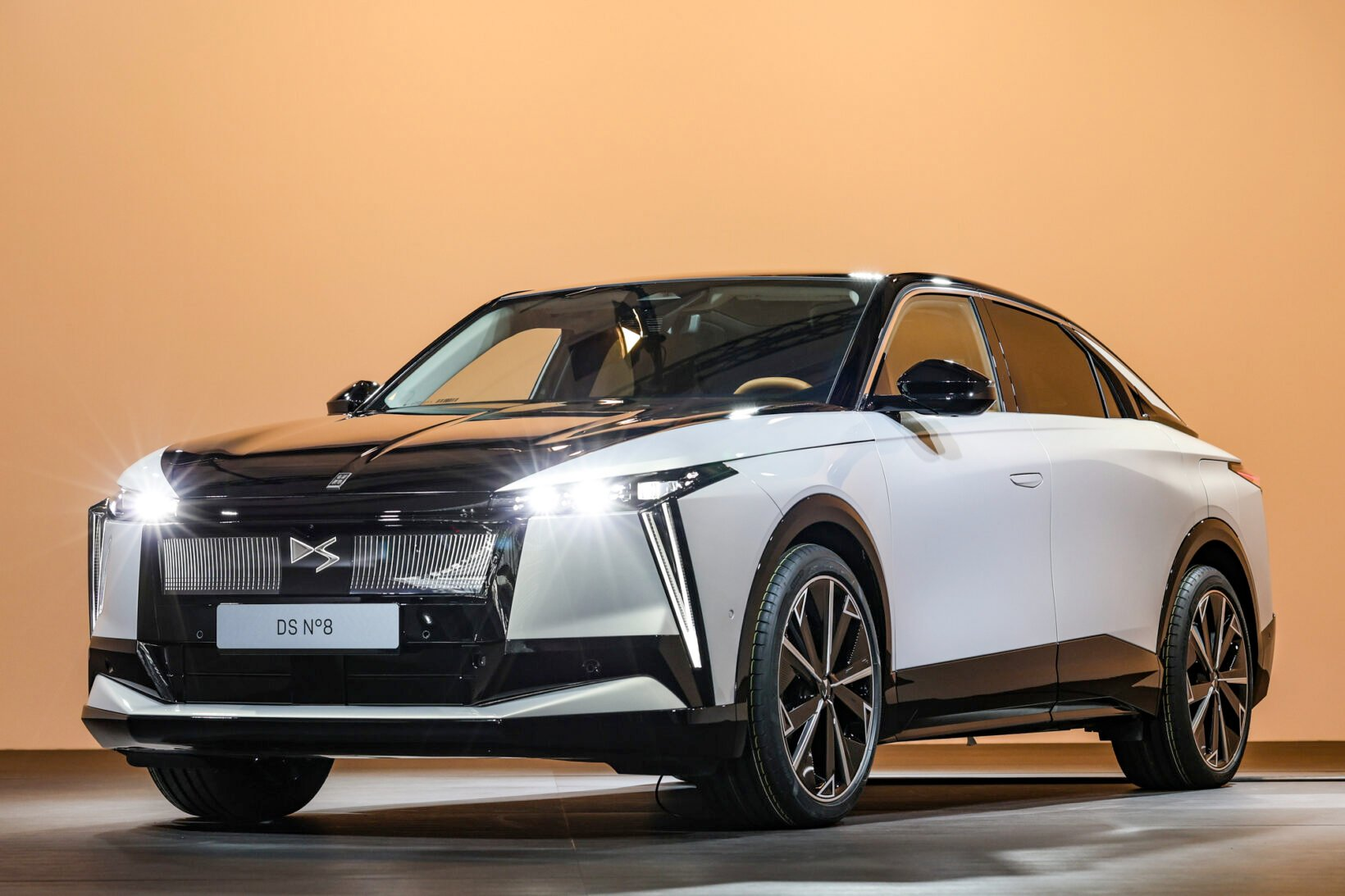
DS N°8

=== Dongfeng Peugeot-Citroën (joint venture) ===
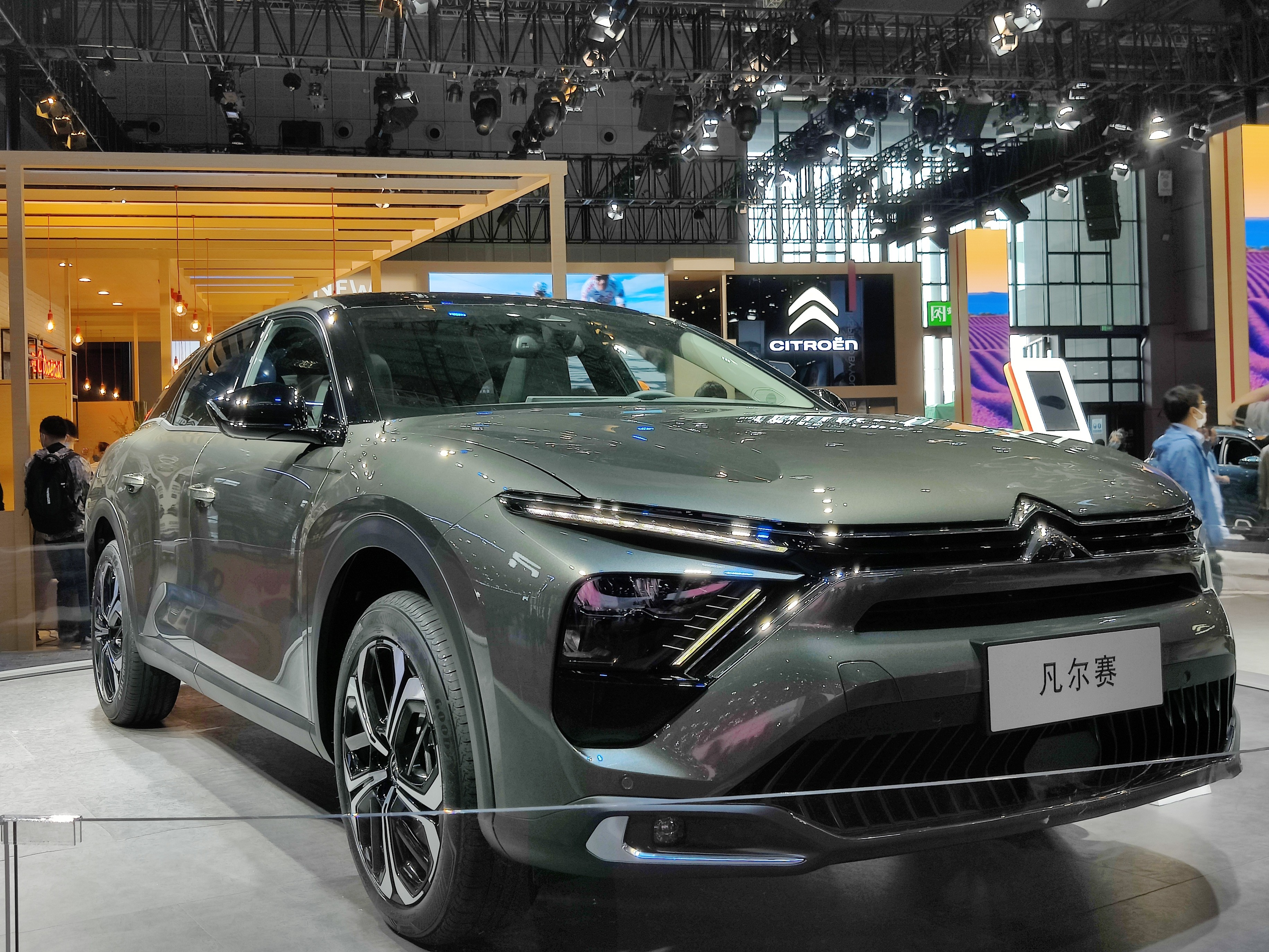
Citroën C5 X

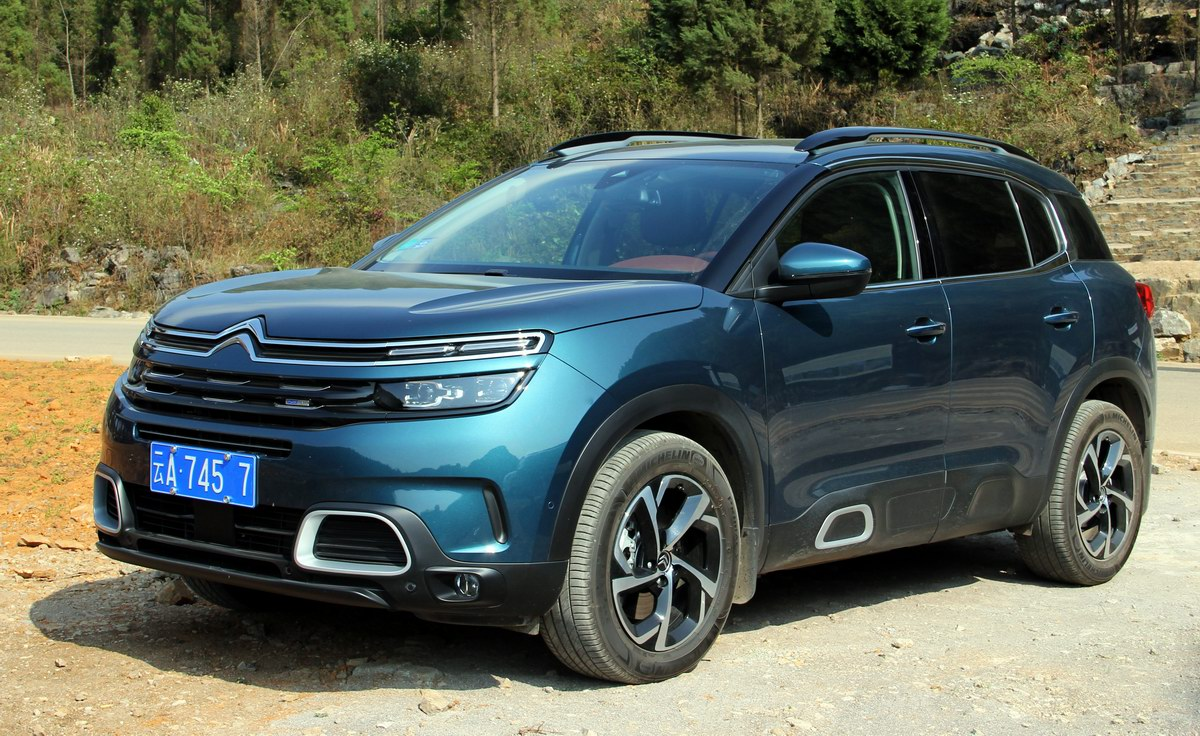
Citroën C5 Aircross

== See also ==
- List of automobile manufacturers of France
- List of companies of France
- Lane departure warning system

== Bibliography ==
- Broustail, Joël; Greggio, Rodolphe (2000). Citroën: Essai sur 80 ans d'antistratégie [Citroën: Essay on 80 years of doing its own thing] (in French). Paris: Vuibert. ISBN 2711778185.
- Gallard, Philippe (2004). A l'assaut du monde: L'aventure Peugeot-Citroën [Storming the World: The Peugeot-Citroën Adventure] (in French). Paris: Bourin. ISBN 2849410136.
