= List of University of Warwick people =

This is a list of University of Warwick people, including office holders, current and former academics and alumni of the University of Warwick, including a brief description of their notability.

Warwick has over 290,000 alumni and an active alumni network.

== Former students ==
=== Academics ===
- Janet Beer – Vice-Chancellor of the University of Liverpool
- Robert Calderbank – former Dean of Natural Sciences at Duke University and winner of the IEEE Richard W. Hamming Medal and the Claude E. Shannon Award
- David Cardwell – superconducting engineer and head of the Cambridge University Engineering Department
- Colin Cooper – Professor of Cancer Genetics at the University of East Anglia
- John Fauvel – historian of mathematics at the Open University
- Luciano Floridi – philosopher of information
- Oliver Hart – economist and former chairman of the Harvard Economics Department, winner of the Nobel Prize in Economics 2016
- H.A. Hellyer – policy consultant and senior research fellow for Muslims in Europe
- Alan Hywel Jones – principal research fellow and senior consultant at Sheffield Hallam University, materials scientist and inventor
- Maris Martinsons – professor of management; international business consultant
- Moeletsi Mbeki – deputy chairman of the South African Institute of International Affairs; brother of former South African president Thabo Mbeki
- Patricia McFadden – Swazi author; professor of sociology; African radical feminist
- Stuart Neil – professor of virology at King's College London
- Pippa Norris – political scientist and McGuire Lecturer in Comparative Politics at the Kennedy School of Government, Harvard University
- Ian Stewart – popular science author; Professor of Mathematics
- Leslie Valiant – British computer scientist and Turing Award winner
- Syed Jamil Ahmed – scholar and theatre director. Founding chair of the Department of Theatre and Music at the University of Dhaka
- Meike Akveld – Lecturer in mathematics at ETH Zurich
- Lara Alcock – Professor in mathematics education at Loughborough University
- Athina Anastasaki – Greek chemist, professor at ETH Zurich
- Peter Barham – Emeritus professor of physics at the University of Bristol
- Denise P. Barlow – Geneticist and winner of the Erwin Schrödinger Prize
- Helen Beebee – Professor of the philosophy of science at the University of Leeds, Fellow of the British Academy
- Phillip Blond – Political Philosopher and Anglican Theologian

=== Art ===
- Benjamin Hope (Mathematics and Physics 1996) – painter

=== Business ===
- Rajiv Bajaj – Managing director and CEO of Bajaj Auto
- Sanjiv Bajaj – Managing director of Bajaj Finserv
- Ian Gorham – CEO of Hargreaves Lansdown
- Bernardo Hees – CEO of the Heinz Company; former CEO of Burger King
- Linda Jackson – CEO of Citroën
- Jyoti Jeetun – Minister of Financial Services; former CEO of Mont Choisy Group
- Nick Landau – co–owner and founder of Titan Entertainment Group and Forbidden Planet sci-fi, fantasy and horror bookstores
- Margaret Milan – founder and owner of Eveil & Jeux
- Mahmoud Mohieldin (PhD Financial Economics, 1995) – former Investment Minister of Egypt; current Managing Director of the World Bank
- Aliza Napartivaumnuay (Master's in Supply Chain Management, 2005) - Thai social and business innovator
- Phil O'Donovan – Bluetooth engineer & CSR plc co-founder
- Ada Osakwe – economist, entrepreneur and corporate executive
- Ralf Speth – CEO of Jaguar Land Rover
- Mary Turner – CEO of Koovs
- Jehangir Wadia – Indian Businessman, Managing Director of Go First, Bombay Dyeing and Bombay Realty, Director on the Boards of Britannia Industries
- Ness Wadia – Indian Businessman, managing director of Bombay Burmah Trading Corporation, co-owner of the Indian Premier League cricket team Punjab Kings
- Tony Wheeler – founder of Lonely Planet travel guides
- Nigel Wilson – CEO of Legal & General Group plc
- George Yankey – CEO of Ghana Gas Company & former Minister of Health in Ghana

=== Cinema and theatre ===
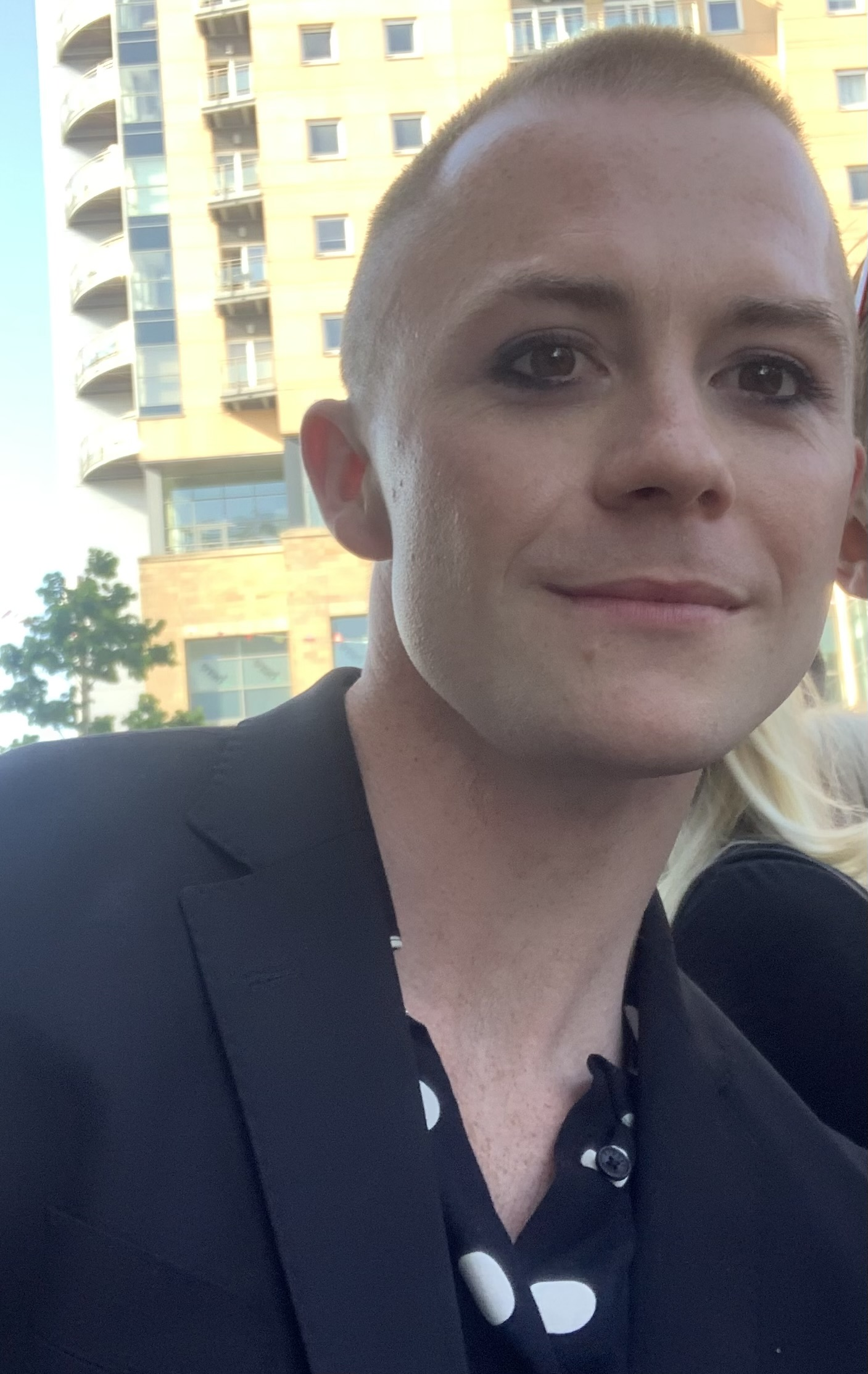
Actor Angus Castle–Doughty

- Paul W. S. Anderson (Film and Literature) – film director
- Adam Buxton (dropped out after two terms) – comedian and actor, best known as part of Adam and Joe
- Angus Castle–Doughty, actor who has starred in Showtrial and Hollyoaks, co-founded theatre company Incognito
- Dominic Cooke – artistic director of the Royal Court Theatre
- Paul Darke (PhD in Film) – academic, artist and disability rights activist, creator of the ''normality drama' theory
- Brett Goldstein (Film & Feminism) – actor and comedian
- Vadim Jean (History) – film director
- Alex Jennings (English and Theatre Studies 1978) – actor who has performed in many lead roles at the RSC
- Ruth Jones (Theatre Studies and Dramatic Arts 1988) – actress known as Myfanwy in Little Britain and Nessa in Gavin & Stacey
- Lloyd Langford – comedian (film and television)
- Stephen Merchant (Film and Literature 1996) – wrote, directed and acted in the British television series The Office and Extras, in such roles as the 'Oggmonster' and 'Darren Lamb' respectively.
- Julian Rhind-Tutt (English) – actor, known from the award-winning comedy series Green Wing
- Frank Skinner, then Chris Collins (MA in English Literature 1981) – comedian, actor, writer
- Nima Taleghani – actor and playwright
- Hannah Waterman – actress

=== Government and politics ===
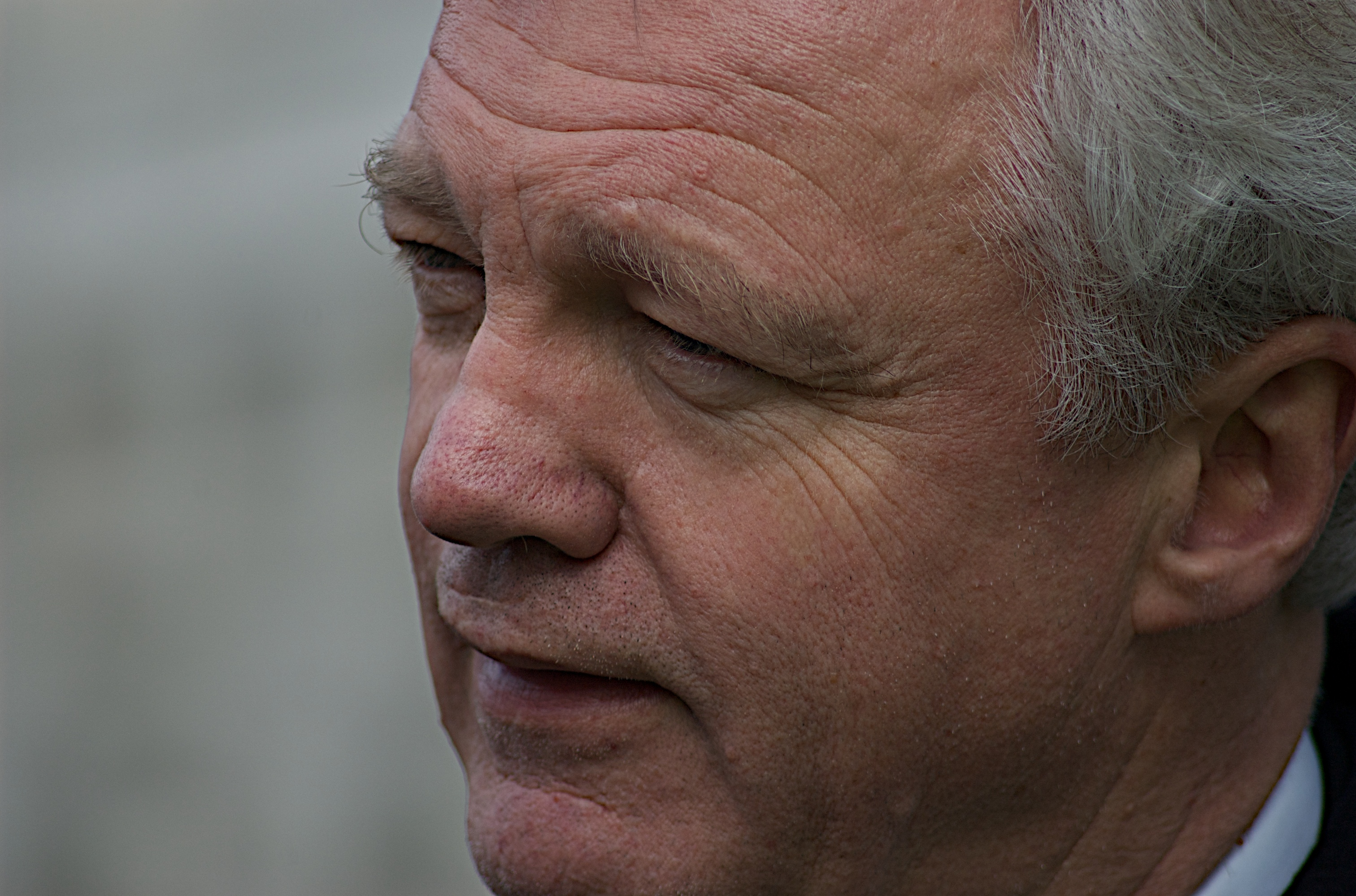
Sir David Davis

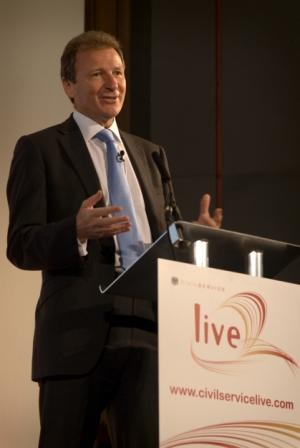
Lord Gus O'Donnell

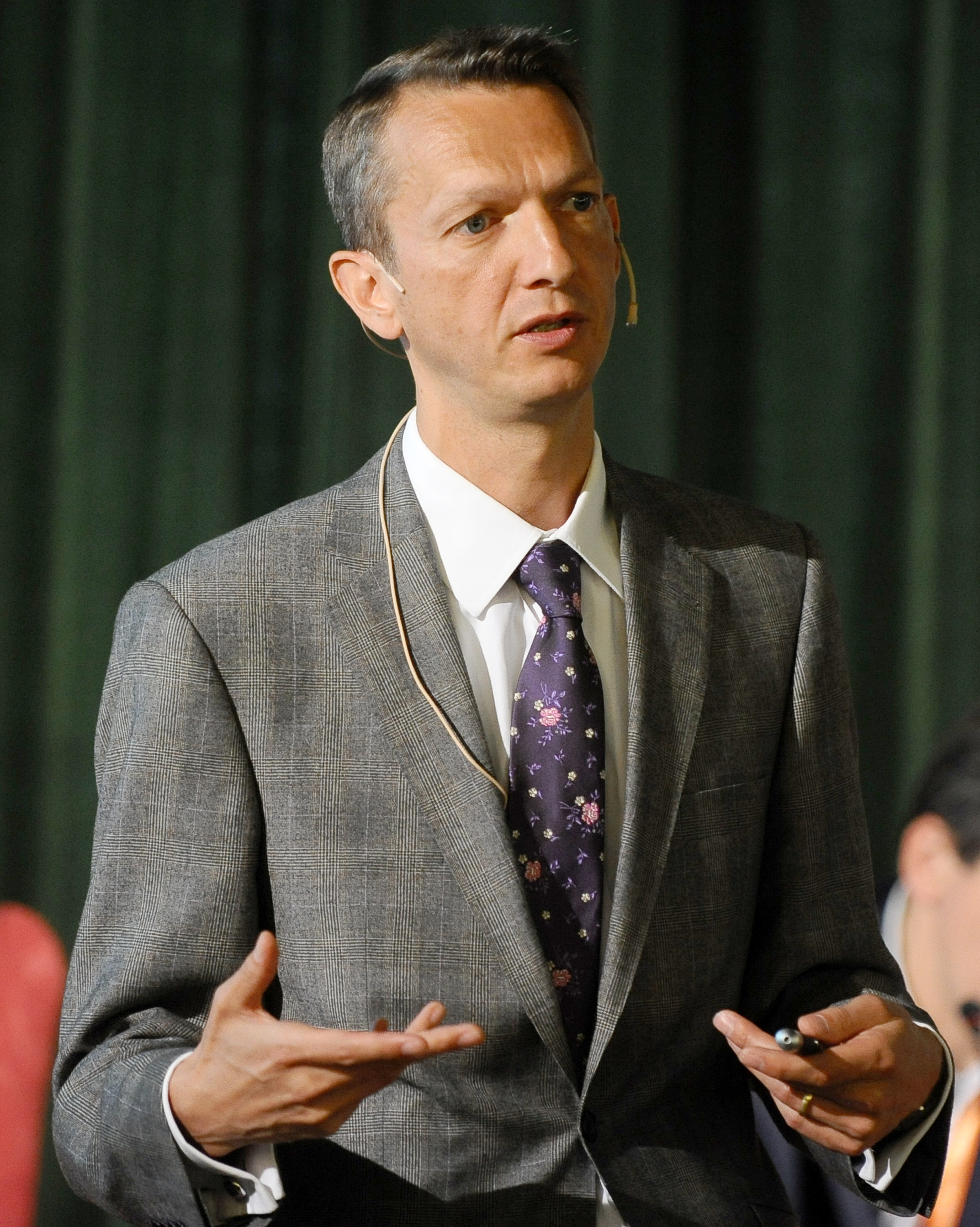
Andy Haldane

- Wendy Alexander (MA, Industrial Relations) – former Labour Leader in the Scottish Parliament
- Luis Arce (Master's in Economics, 1997) – President of Bolivia, former Minister of Economy and Public Finance in Bolivia
- Joseph Ngute – Prime Minister, Head of Government of the Republic of Cameroon
- Valerie Amos, Baroness Amos (Sociology 1976) – Britain's first female black Cabinet Minister, formerly Leader of the House of Lords, Lord President of the Council and British High Commissioner to Australia; and now Under-Secretary-General for Humanitarian Affairs and Emergency Relief Coordinator at the UN
- Tim Barrow – diplomat and British Ambassador to Russia since 2011
- Yunus Carrim – Minister of Communications of South Africa
- Chan Yuen Han - active female unionists in Hong Kong
- Vernon Coaker (BA (Hons) Politics and Economics) – Member of Parliament for Gedling and Government Minister until 2010
- Jon Cruddas (PhD in philosophy, 1990) – Member of Parliament for Dagenham and formerly a candidate for deputy leadership of the Labour Party
- Sir David Davis (Molecular Science/Computer Science, 1968–1971) – Conservative MP and former secretary of state for exiting the EU
- Claire Darke, (Certificate of Social Work) – 161st mayor of Wolverhampton
- Becky Gittins – Labour Member of Parliament for Clwyd East
- Yakubu Gowon (PhD in Political Science) – former president of Nigeria
- Andy Haldane (Economics) – chief economist at the Bank of England
- Kim Howells (PhD) – former Foreign Office minister
- Guðni Thorlacius Jóhannesson – President of Iceland
- George Chouliarakis – Academic and Greek Alternate Minister of Finance
- George W. Kanyeihamba – Member of the Supreme Court of Uganda and African Court on Human and Peoples' Rights; Legal Advisor to the President of Uganda on Human Rights and International Affairs
- Sir Bob Kerslake – Head of the Home Civil Service
- Andrea Leadsom (Political Science) – Conservative Member of Parliament for South Northamptonshire and Secretary of State for the Environment
- Sir Richard Leese – Leader of Manchester City Council
- Sir David Li - Chairman and Chief Executive of the Bank of East Asia; member of the Legislative Council of Hong Kong; former member of the Executive Council of Hong Kong
- Tim Loughton (Classical Civilisation) – Conservative former Parliamentary Under-Secretary of State for Children and Families
- Estelle Morris, Baroness Morris of Yardley – Privy Counsellor; former Labour Secretary of State for Education; graduated from Coventry College of Education
- Lord Gus O'Donnell (Economics 1973) – former Cabinet Secretary and Head of the Home Civil Service
- Lord Brian Paddick – former Deputy Assistant Commissioner in the Metropolitan Police and London Mayoral candidate for the Liberal Democrats in 2008 and 2012
- José Fernando Franco González Salas – Ministry of the Supreme Court of Justice of Mexico
- George Saitoti – Former vice-president of Kenya, former Executive Chairman of the World Bank and the International Monetary Fund and former president of the African, Caribbean and Pacific Group of States (ACP)
- Dan Stoenescu – Romanian diplomat and former Minister for Romanians Abroad
- Valentine Strasser – former head of state of Sierra Leone; did not complete his studies at Warwick
- Aung Tun Thet – Burmese economist and the Economic Advisor to the president of Burma
- Carrie Symonds – British political activist, conservationist and Partner of Boris Johnson
- Eva Abdulla – Maldivian politician, former deputy speaker of the People's Majlis
- Ahmed Afif – Vice president of Seychelles
- Awwad Alawwad – Saudi politician, former Minister of Culture and Information and former ambassador to Germany
- Philip Barton – British diplomat, former Permanent Under-Secretary of the Foreign, Commonwealth and Development Office

=== History ===
- David Englander – historian and author
- Victor Bailey – professor of British history at the University of Kansas
- Catherine Armstrong – professor of modern history at Loughborough University

=== Literature ===
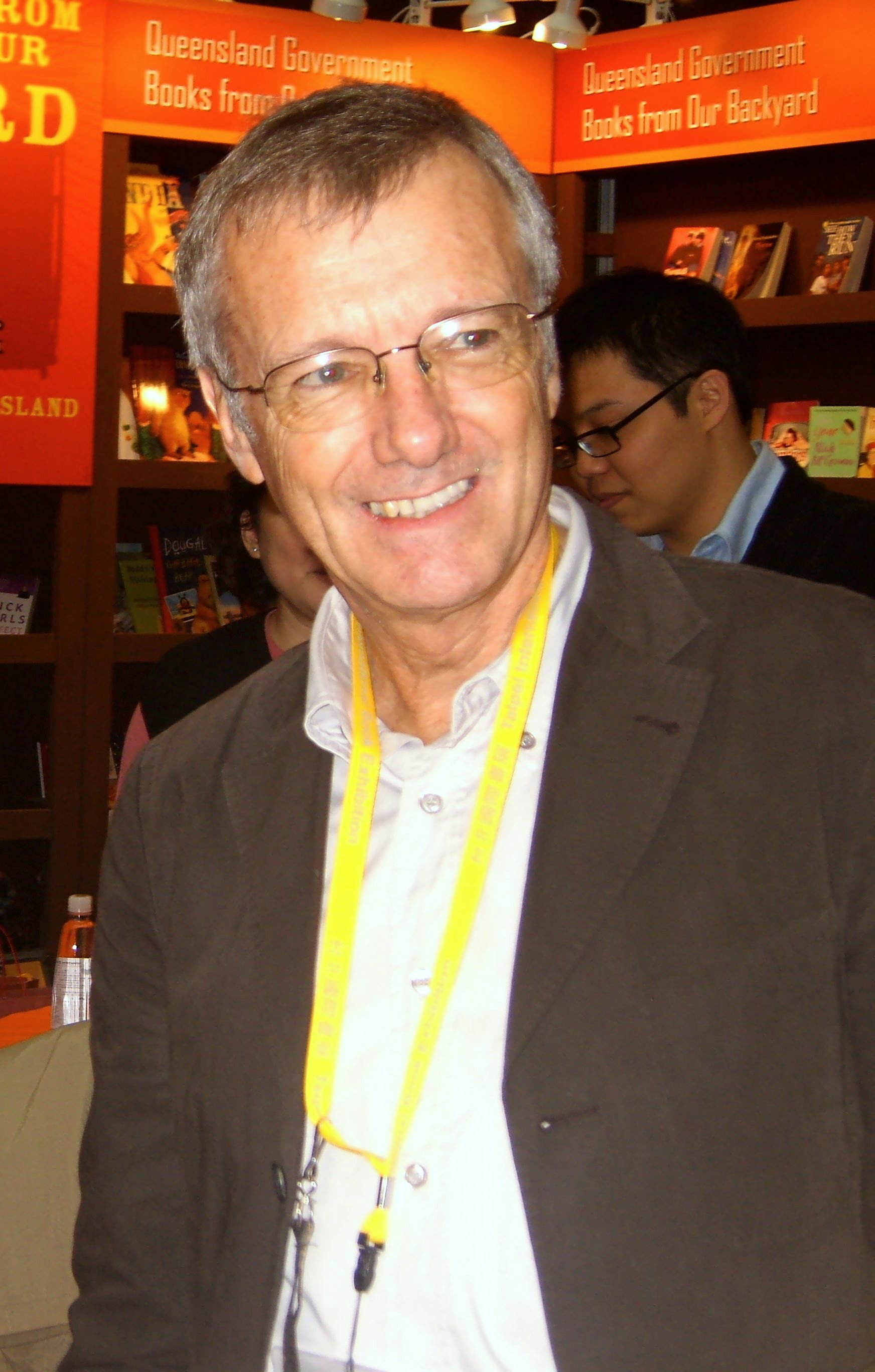
Lonely Planet founder Tony Wheeler

- Nicholas Blincoe – author
- Simon Calder (Mathematics) – travel writer for The Independent
- Jonathan Coe (English Literature) – novelist and writer
- Sarah Crossan – Irish author
- Hannah Doran - playwright
- Anne Fine (History '68) – children's author
- James Franklin (Mathematics) – historian of ideas; philosopher
- Sam Gillespie – philosopher and early translator and commentator of Alain Badiou, crucial to Badiou's initial reception in the English-speaking world
- Mal Lewis Jones (English and American literature '70) – children's author
- Kaiser Haq – Bangladeshi writer and translator
- A. L. Kennedy (Theatre and Performance Studies) – author
- Peter Linebaugh (History '75) – author of The Magna Carta Manifesto
- Sally Nicholls (Philosophy and Literature '05) – children's and young adult author
- Mal Peet – author, writer of popular young adult literature, Keeper, Tamar, others...
- Robin Stevens, children's author
- Chip Tsao (pen name: To Kit) (English Literature) – Hong Kong cultural and political commentator
- Patrick M. Vollmer – House of Lords Librarian
- Tony Wheeler (Engineering '68) – co-founder of Lonely Planet (LP) travel guides
- Yilin Zhong (Cultural Studies '05) – journalist and author of 8 books, novel "Chinatown" released in 2011.
- Anmol Malik (Computer Science and Business) – prominent Indian Author, Singer, Songwriter
- Joshua Bennett – Author and professor of literature at the Massachusetts Institute of Technology
- Caroline Bergvall – French-Norwegian poet

=== Law ===
- Yomi Adegoke – journalist, known for writing the Slay in Your Lane book series
- Princess Azemah Ni'matul Bolkiah (LLB '08) – Bruneian princess
- Sophia Rosetta Bernasko-Essah – Justice of the Supreme Court of Ghana
- Constance Briscoe – disgraced barrister convicted of perverting the course of justice
- Phil Shiner (LLM '85) – lawyer struck off for misconduct
- Charles A. Adeogun-Phillips – international lawyer, former lead genocide prosecutor and head of special investigations at the United Nations

=== Media ===
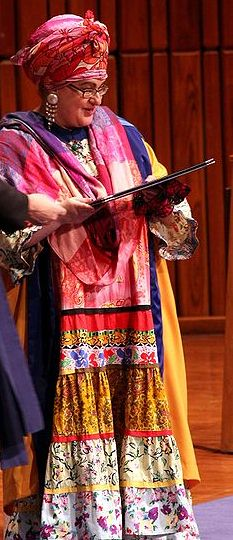
Camila Batmanghelidjh, charity executive

- Camila Batmanghelidjh – charity executive
- Jennie Bond (French and European Literature 1968) – former BBC Royal correspondent
- Brian Deer (Philosophy) – The Sunday Times; Channel 4
- Tom Dunmore (Film & Literature) – Editor In Chief, Stuff Magazine
- George Eaton – political editor of the New Statesman
- Giles Fletcher (Computer Science 1987) – glam rock artist
- Michelle Fleury (Literature & French Language 1991) – BBC US business correspondent
- Janan Ganesh (Politics) – Financial Times journalist
- Leona Graham (Drama) – radio presenter and voice–over artist
- Merfyn Jones – Governor BBC and former Vice-Chancellor of the University of Wales, Bangor
- James King (Film and Literature) – BBC Radio 1 film critic
- Timmy Mallett (History 1977) – 1980s children's television presenter
- Simon Mayo (History and Politics 1981) – broadcaster
- Peter Salmon (European Literature 1977) – BBC television executive
- Tim Vickery (History and Politics) – South American football correspondent for BBC Sport, ESPN and an analyst on SporTV's main morning programme, Redação SporTV.
- Christian Wolmar (1971) – writer on transport and social issues
- Dawn Foster (English 2009) – British journalist, broadcaster and author
- Bernard Avle - Ghanaian broadcast journalist, host of the Citi Breakfast show
- Heather Brooke - journalist and freedom of information campaigner, helped expose the 2009 parliamentary expenses scandal
- Horatio Gould - Comedian and co-host of Fin VS History

=== Music ===
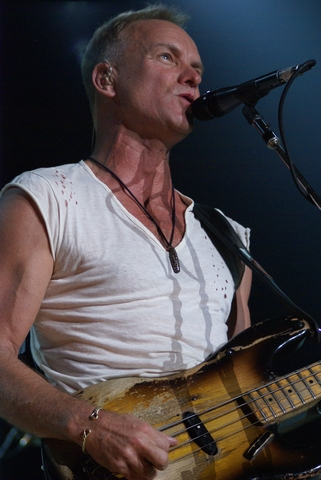
Sting

- DJ Yoda (English and American Literature 1998) – Hip hop turntablist
- Gareth Emery – DJ and founder of electronic label Garuda, rated world's no.14 DJ in 2012
- Roxanne Emery – solo singer/songwriter artist, founder of LATE records
- Adem Ilhan (studied Mathematics) – solo artist; member of Fridge
- Kode9 (PhD in Philosophy) – dubstep producer, DJ and owner of the Hyperdub record label
- Sting (left after one term) – lead singer of The Police and solo artist
- Robert Willis – Dean of Canterbury, composer of hymns
- Nissi Ogulu (Mechanical Engineering) - singer/songwriter

=== Sport ===
- Kevin Blackwell (Certificate in Applied Management in Football) – football manager
- Aidy Boothroyd (Certificate in Applied Management in Football) – football manager
- Janet Gedrych (Laws) – Great Britain and Wales international rugby union player and United Rugby Championship disciplinary panel member
- Steve Heighway (Economics) – Liverpool F.C. footballer
- Mark Hughes (Certificate in Applied Management in Football) – football manager
- Yasmin Liverpool (Economics) – 200m and 400m sprinter
- Stuart Pearce (Certificate in Applied Management in Football) – football manager
- Princess Azemah (Laws) – polo player

=== Science ===
- Konstantin Borisov – Russian Cosmonaut
- James Briscoe – scientist, senior group leader at the Francis Crick Institute

== Notable faculty and staff ==
Notable current and former faculty and staff at Warwick include:

=== Biological sciences ===
- Sir Howard Dalton - Chief Scientific Advisor to Defra
- Sir Brian Follett – also formerly Warwick University's vice-chancellor (1993–2001)

=== Chemistry ===
- Keith Jennings – known for work in mass spectrometry and collision-induced dissociation

=== Classics and Ancient History ===
- Alison E. Cooley – Roman historian
- James Davidson – social historian of Ancient Greece
- Michael Scott – ancient historian and broadcaster
- Zahra Newby – historian of Ancient art and the visual culture of festivals
- Victoria Rimell – latinist
- Simon Swain – scholar of Greek culture under Rome

=== English ===
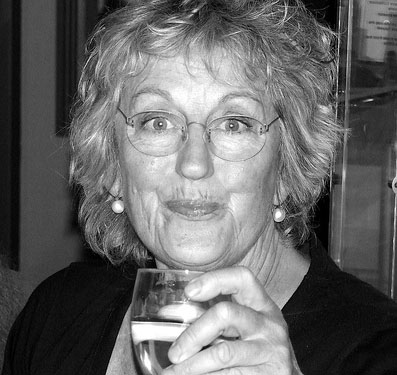
Germaine Greer

- Susan Bassnett – translation theorist and scholar of comparative literature
- Jonathan Bate
- Andrew Davies – television screenwriter
- Sir Michael Edwards – first Briton to be voted into the Académie Française
- Maureen Freely – writer, author and translator of works by Orhan Pamuk
- K. W. Gransden – poet and critic; one of the founders of the English Department
- Germaine Greer – former Professor of English and Comparative Literature
- A. L. Kennedy
- China Miéville – fiction writer
- David Vann – creative writing professor
- John Fletcher – literary theorist

=== Engineering and computer science ===
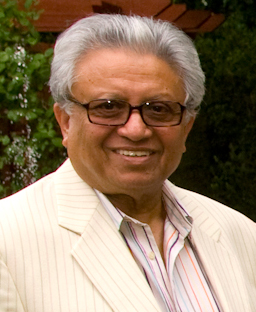
Lord Bhattacharyya

- Lord Bhattacharyya – founder and Director of the Warwick Manufacturing Group
- Mike Cowlishaw – creator of the REXX programming language
- Hugh Darwen – creator of Tutorial D database language
- Mike Paterson – former director of the Centre for Discrete Mathematics and its Applications
- Kevin Warwick – cyborg researcher

=== History ===
- David Arnold – Indian historian
- J. H. Elliott – Spanish historian
- John Rigby Hale – Renaissance historian and first Professor of History at Warwick University
- E. P. Thompson – Marxist historian and founding member of the CND

=== Law ===
- Shaheen Sardar Ali – Professor of Law
- Patrick Atiyah – barrister and legal writer
- Upendra Baxi – Professor of Law
- John McEldowney – Professor of Public Law
- Paul Raffield – Professor of Law; actor in Joking Apart

=== Mathematics and statistics ===
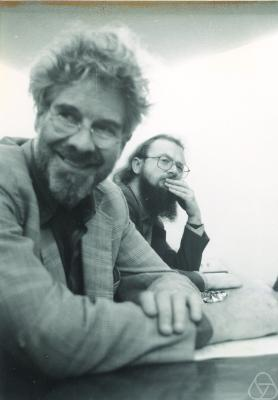
Christopher Zeeman

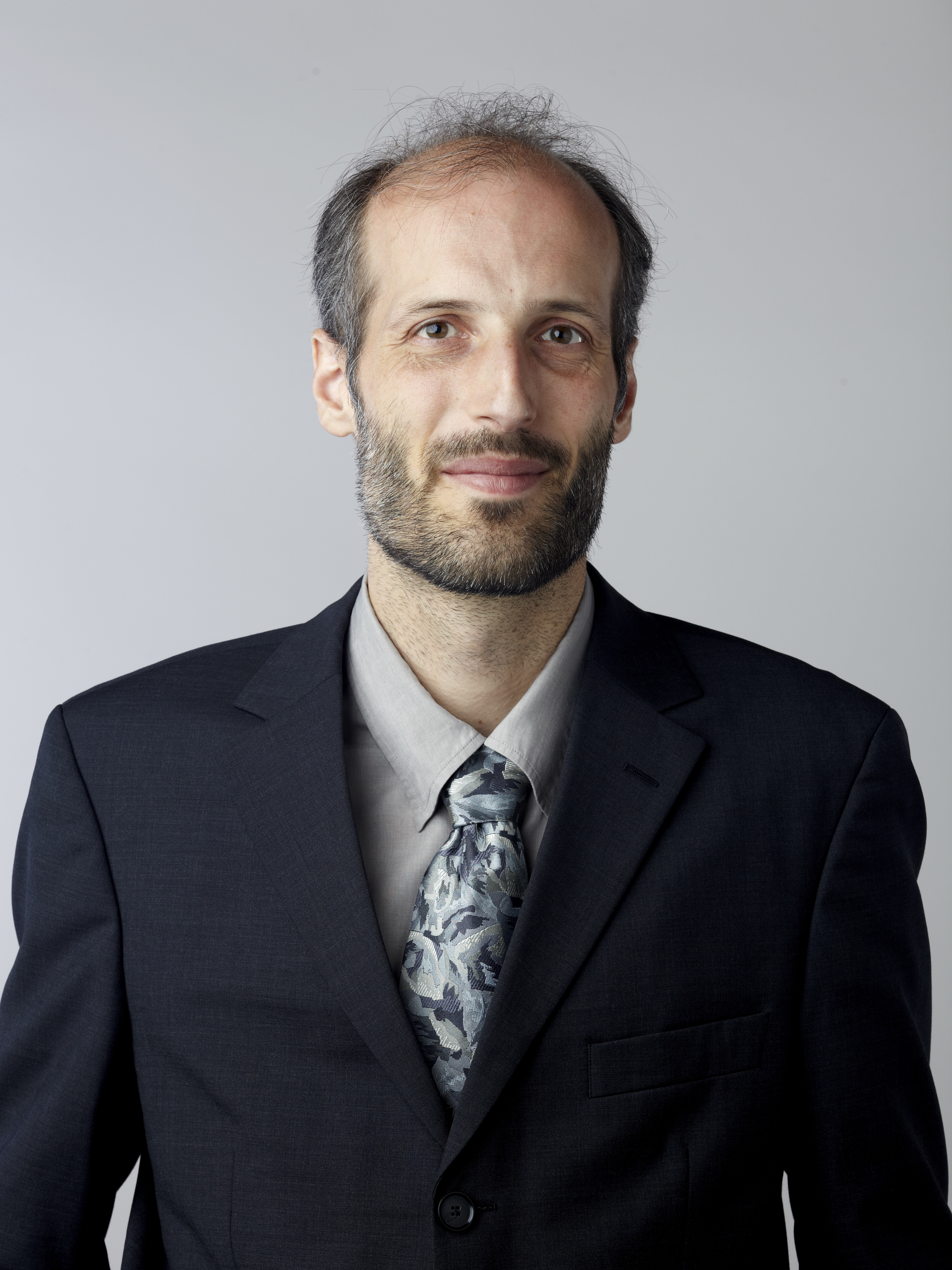
Fields Medallist Martin Hairer

- Brian Bowditch – mathematician known for contributions to geometry and topology, and for solving the angel problem
- Jack Cohen – developmental biologist; xenobiologist; honorary professor
- David Epstein – mathematician known for his work in hyperbolic geometry; co-founder of the University of Warwick mathematics department
- Martin Hairer – expert in stochastic partial differential equations; winner of the Fields Medal, Philip Leverhulme Prize, the Royal Society Wolfson Award and the LMS Whitehead Prize
- Wilfrid Kendall – probabalist and president of the Bernoulli Society for Mathematical Statistics and Probability (2013 – 2015)
- Robert Sinclair MacKay – mathematician known for his work on dynamical systems; current president of the Institute of Mathematics and its Applications
- David Preiss – winner of the 2008 Pólya Prize for his contributions to analysis and geometric measure theory
- Miles Reid – mathematician known for work in algebraic geometry
- Gareth Roberts, statistician known for work on Markov chain Monte Carlo methodology; winner of the Royal Statistical Society Guy Medal in Silver and Bronze; an ISI highly cited researcher
- Ian Stewart – mathematician, popular science author and an ISI highly cited researcher
- Andrew M. Stuart – mathematician known for his contributions to numerical analysis and computational mathematics; winner of the Leslie Fox Prize for Numerical Analysis
- Sir Christopher Zeeman – topologist; exponent of catastrophe theory; founding professor of mathematics; former president of the London Mathematical Society; namesake of the Mathematics and Statistics building; principal of Hertford College, Oxford

=== Philosophy ===
- Quassim Cassam – Professor of Philosophy
- Angie Hobbs – Lecturer
- Nick Land – Former lecturer, known as the father of accelerationism
- David Miller – Emeritus Reader of Philosophy
- Peter Poellner – Professor of Philosophy

=== Social sciences ===
- Lady Margaret Archer – theorist in critical realism; former president of International Sociological Association; current president of Pontifical Academy of Social Sciences
- Sir George Bain – former chairman of the School of Industrial and Business Studies
- Söhnke M. Bartram – Professor of Finance
- James A. Beckford – Professor Emeritus of Sociology
- Jim Bulpitt – Professor of Politics
- Simon Clarke – professor of sociology
- Robin Cohen – honorary professor
- Nicholas Crafts – professor of economics and economic history
- Avinash Dixit – economist
- Robert Fine – Professor Emeritus, theorist of cosmopolitanism
- Steve Fuller – Professor of Sociology, theorist in science and technology studies
- Wyn Grant – former chair of the British Political Studies Association (2002–2005); President of the PSA (2005–2008) Political scientist with interest in comparative public policy
- Peter J. Hammond – Professor of Economics
- H. A. Hellyer – senior research Fellow; specialist on Muslims in Europe and West–Muslim world relations
- Richard Higgott – Director of the Warwick Commission to the World Bank
- Elena Korosteleva – political scientist, Director of the Institute for Global Sustainable Development
- Abhinay Muthoo – Professor of Economics and Dean of Warwick in London
- Andrew Oswald – Professor of Economics
- Tobias Preis – Associate Professor of Behavioural Science and Finance
- John Rex – Professor Emeritus
- Sir Ken Robinson – Professor Emeritus of Education
- Robert Skidelsky, Baron Skidelsky – Professor Emeritus of Political Economy
- Nicholas Stern, Baron Stern of Brentford – former Chief Economist of the World Bank
- Susan Strange – political economist and former chair of International Relations
- Mark P. Taylor – Dean of Warwick Business School and Professor of International Finance
- John Williamson – English economist who coined the term Washington Consensus
- Sarah D. Goode – Former lecturer in child health at Warwick Medical School

=== Other ===
- The Coull String Quartet – quartet-in-residence since 1977
- Koen Lamberts – psychologist, Vice-Chancellor of the University of Sheffield
- Mark Smith – physicist, Vice-Chancellor of Lancaster University
- Nigel Thrift – geographer, Vice-Chancellor of the University of Warwick

== Administration ==
=== Chancellors ===
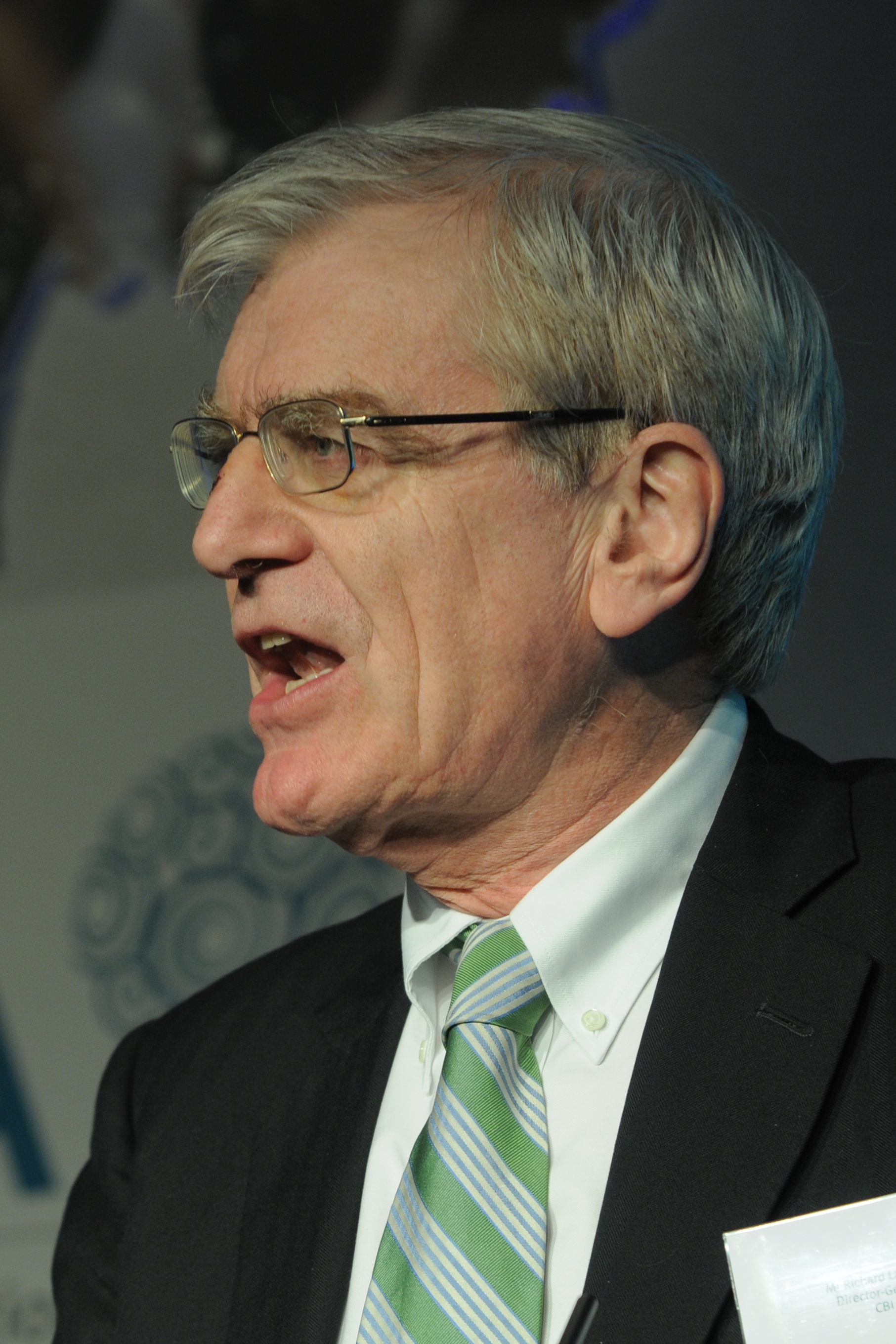
Former Chancellor Richard Lambert

- William Rootes, 1st Baron Rootes – Chancellor-designate (died in December 1964 before taking office)
- Cyril Radcliffe, 1st Viscount Radcliffe (1965–1977)
- Leslie Scarman, Baron Scarman (1977–1989)
- Sir Shridath "Sonny" Ramphal (1989–2002)
- Sir Nicholas Scheele (2003–2008)
- Sir Richard Lambert (2008–2016)
- Catherine Ashton, Baroness Ashton of Upholland (2017–present)

=== Vice-chancellors ===
- Jack Butterworth, Baron Butterworth (1965–1985)
- Clark L. Brundin (1985–1992)
- Sir Brian K. Follett (1993–2001)
- David VandeLinde (2001–2006)
- Nigel Thrift (2006–2016)
- Stuart Croft (2016–present)
