= David Haddleton =

English chemist (born 1962)

- Born: June 1962 (age 64); Birmingham, England
- Education: University of York (B.Sc.); University of Toronto, (D.Phil.); University of Southern Mississippi
- Occupation: Professor of Polymer Chemistry

David Mark Haddleton (born 1962) is a professor in the department of chemistry at the University of Warwick. His work focuses on controlled polymer synthesis and the industrial applications of polymer materials. He is a Fellow of the Royal Society of Chemistry.

== Career ==
Haddleton was editor in chief of the European Polymer Journal from 2002 – 2009 prior to becoming the founding editor and editor in chief of the Royal Society of Chemistry Polymer Chemistry from 2009 to 2017. He is the executive editor in chief of Cambridge Materials journals published by Cambridge University Press (CUP). He has founded two companies Warwick Effect Polymers Ltd (now part of Abzena) a drug-polymer conjugation company and Medherant Ltd which develops transdermal drug delivery patches for delivery of testosterone for women where he is a director and CSO.

== Selected publications ==
- Ladmiral, V.; Mantovani, G.; Clarkson, G. J.; Cauet, S.; Irwin, J. L.; Haddleton, D. M., Synthesis of neoglycopolymers by a combination of "click chemistry" and living radical polymerization. Journal of the American Chemical Society 2006, 128 (14), 4823-4830. https://doi.org/10.1021/ja058364k
- Mantovani, G.; Lecolley, F.; Tao, L.; Haddleton, D. M.; Clerx, J.; Cornelissen, J.; Velonia, K., Design and synthesis of N-maleimido-functionalized hydrophilic polymers via copper-mediated living radical polymerization: A suitable alternative to PEGylation chemistry. Journal of the American Chemical Society 2005, 127 (9), 2966-2973. https://doi.org/10.1021/ja0430999
- Ryan, S. M.; Mantovani, G.; Wang, X. X.; Haddleton, D. M.; Brayden, D. J., Advances in PEGylation of important biotech molecules: delivery aspects. Expert Opinion on Drug Delivery 2008, 5 (4), 371-383. https://doi.org/10.1517/17425247.5.4.371
- Tao, L.; Mantovani, G.; Lecolley, F.; Haddleton, D. M., α-Aldehyde terminally functional methacrylic polymers from living radical polymerization: Application in protein conjugation "pegylation". Journal of the American Chemical Society 2004, 126 (41), 13220-13221. https://doi.org/10.1021/ja0456454
- Zhang, Q.; Wilson, P.; Li, Z. D.; McHale, R.; Godfrey, J.; Anastasaki, A.; Waldron, C.; Haddleton, D. M., Aqueous Copper-Mediated Living Polymerization: Exploiting Rapid Disproportionation of CuBr with Me_{6}TREN. Journal of the American Chemical Society 2013, 135 (19), 7355-7363. https://doi.org/10.1021/ja4026402
- Haddleton, D. M.; Jasieczek, C. B.; Hannon, M. J.; Shooter, A. J., Atom transfer radical polymerization of methyl methacrylate initiated by alkyl bromide and 2-pyridinecarbaldehyde imine copper(I) complexes. Macromolecules 1997, 30 (7), 2190-2193. https://doi.org/10.1021/ma961074r
- Anastasaki, A.; Nikolaou, V.; Nurumbetov, G.; Wilson, P.; Kempe, K.; Quinn, J. F.; Davis, T. P.; Whittaker, M. R.; Haddleton, D. M., Cu(0)-Mediated Living Radical Polymerization: A Versatile Tool for Materials Synthesis. Chemical Reviews 2016, 116 (3), 835-877. https://doi.org/10.1021/acs.chemrev.5b00191
- Davis, T. P.; Kukulj, D.; Haddleton, D. M.; Maloney, D. R., Cobalt-Mediated Free-Radical Polymerisation of Acrylic-Monomers. Trends in Polymer Science 1995, 3 (11), 365-373. https://www.scopus.com/record/display.uri?eid=2-s2.0-0001042297&origin=inward&txGid=a854b72ffb71b1d10ed6a7e96b904cca
- Engelis, N. G.; Anastasaki, A.; Nurumbetov, G.; Truong, N. P.; Nikolaou, V.; Shegiwal, A.; Whittaker, M. R.; Davis, T. P.; Haddleton, D. M., Sequence-controlled methacrylic multiblock copolymers via sulfur-free RAFT emulsion polymerization. Nature Chemistry 2017, 9 (2), 171-178. https://doi.org/10.1038/nchem.2634
