= Rimell =

Rimell is a surname. Notable people with the surname include:

- Anthony Rimell (1928–2007), English cricketer
- Fred Rimell (1913–1981), British National Hunt racing jockey and horse trainer
- Victoria Rimell (born 1974), British classicist and professor
