= McEldowney =

McEldowney is a surname. Notable people with the surname include:

- Brooke McEldowney, the creator of 9 Chickweed Lane, a print comic strip, and of Pibgorn, a webcomic
- Dennis McEldowney (1926–2003), New Zealand born author and publisher
- Francis McEldowney (born 1981), Irish Gaelic footballer who plays for Derry, with whom he has won a National League title
- Harrison McEldowney, American choreographer known for his theatrical work
- John McEldowney (law professor), Professor of Law at the University of Warwick and former World Bank visiting Fellow in the Supreme Tribunal of Justice in Venezuela
- Nancy McEldowney (born 1958), United States career diplomat
