= John McEldowney =

John McEldowney may refer to:

- John McEldowney (law professor)
- John McEldowney (rugby union)
