= Roman mythology =

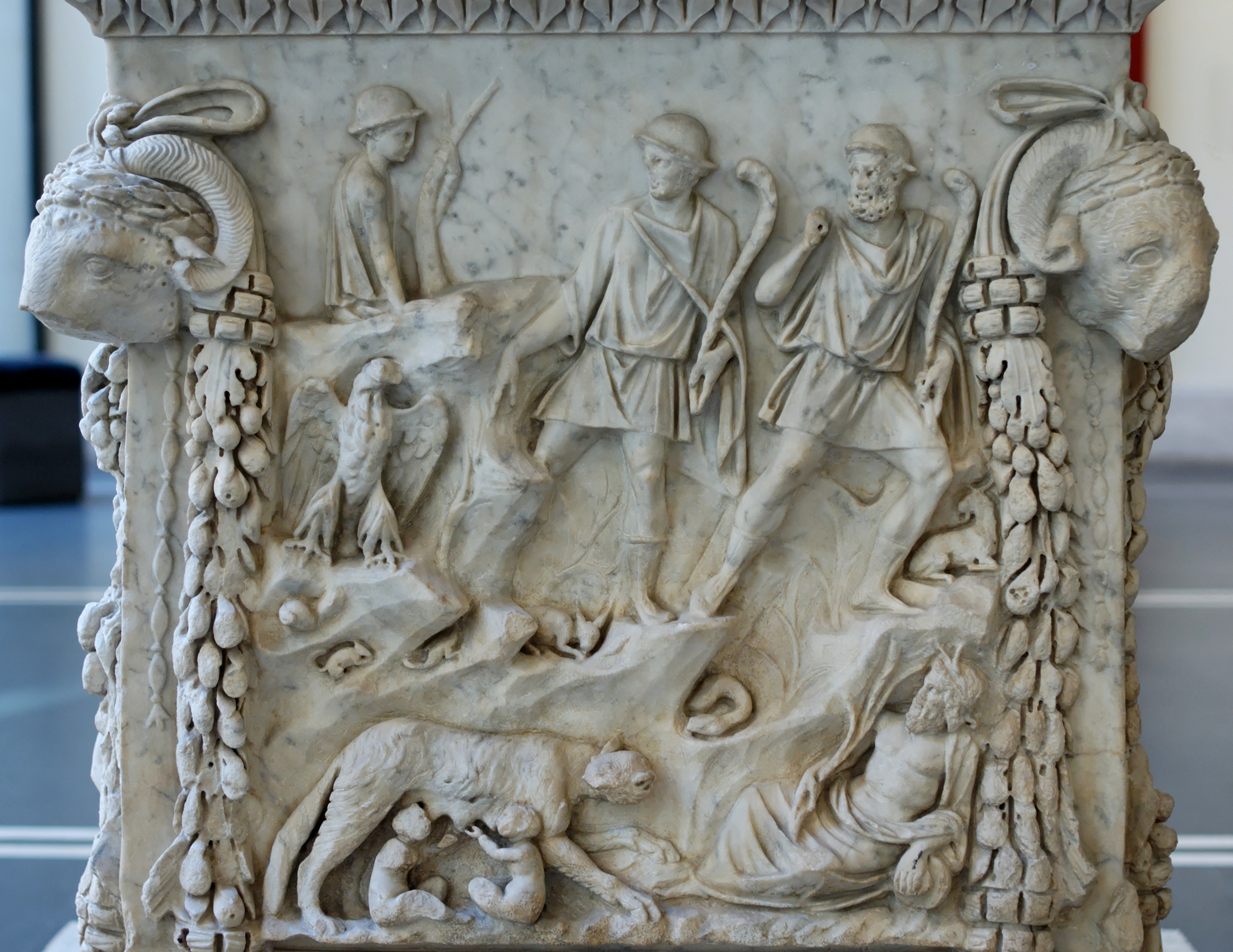
Romulus and Remus, the Lupercal, Father Tiber, and the Palatine on a relief from a pedestal dating to the reign of Trajan (AD 98–117)

Roman mythology is the body of myths of ancient Rome as represented in the literature and visual arts of the Romans, and is a form of Roman folklore. "Roman mythology" may also refer to the modern study of these representations, and to the subject matter as represented in the literature and art of other cultures in any period. Roman mythology draws from the mythology of the Italic peoples and shares mythemes with Proto-Indo-European mythology.

The Romans usually treated their traditional narratives as historical, even when these have miraculous or supernatural elements. The stories are often concerned with politics and morality, and how an individual's personal integrity relates to their responsibility to the community or Roman state. Heroism is an important theme. When the stories illuminate Roman religious practices, they are more concerned with ritual, augury, and institutions than with theology or cosmogony.

Roman mythology also draws on Greek mythology, primarily during the Hellenistic period of Greek influence and through the Roman conquest of Greece, via the artistic imitation of Greek literary models by Roman authors. The Romans identified their own gods with those of the ancient Greeks and reinterpreted myths about Greek deities under the names of their Roman counterparts. The influence of Greek mythology likely began as early as Rome's protohistory. Classical mythology is the amalgamated tradition of Greek and Roman mythologies, as disseminated especially by Latin literature in Europe throughout the Middle Ages, into the Renaissance, and up to present-day uses of myths in fiction and movies. The interpretations of Greek myths by the Romans often had a greater influence on narrative and pictorial representations of myths than Greek sources.

Roman mythology is found in a number of literary works that came to be regarded as canonical, such as the Aeneid by Virgil and Ovid's Metamorphoses, and has been represented in the arts since antiquity.

== Nature of Roman myth ==
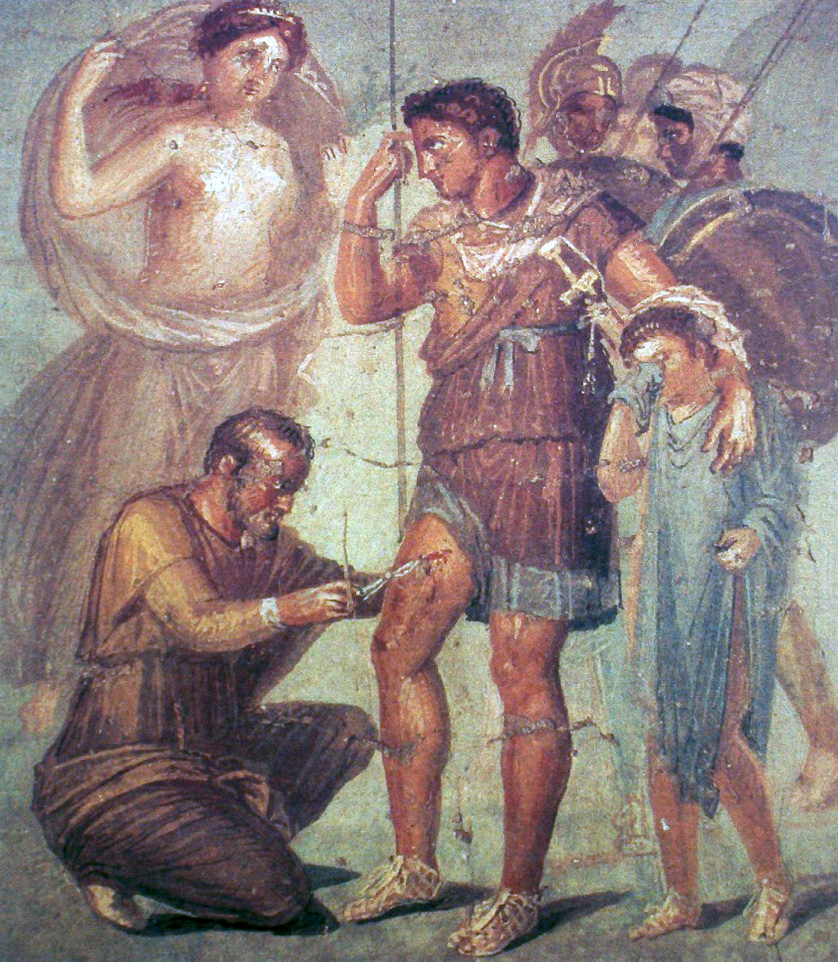
In this wall painting from Pompeii, Venus looks on while the physician Iapyx tends to the wound of her son, Aeneas; the tearful boy is her grandson Ascanius, also known as Iulus, legendary ancestor of Julius Caesar and the Julio-Claudian dynasty

Because ritual played the central role in Roman religion that myth did for the Greeks, it is sometimes doubted that the Romans had much of a native mythology. This perception is a product of Romanticism and the classical scholarship of the 19th century, which valued Greek civilization as more "authentically creative." From the Renaissance to the 18th century, however, Roman myths were an inspiration particularly for European painting. The Roman tradition is rich in historical myths, or legends, concerning the foundation and rise of the city. These narratives focus on human actors, with only occasional intervention from deities but a pervasive sense of divinely ordered destiny. In Rome's earliest period, history and myth have a mutual and complementary relationship. As T. P. Wiseman notes:

The Roman stories still matter, as they mattered to Dante in 1300 and Shakespeare in 1600 and the founding fathers of the United States in 1776. What does it take to be a free citizen? Can a superpower still be a republic? How does well-meaning authority turn into murderous tyranny?

Major sources for Roman myth include the Aeneid of Virgil and the first few books of Livy's history as well as Dionysius's Roman Antiquities. Other important sources are the Fasti of Ovid, a six-book poem structured by the Roman religious calendar, and the fourth book of elegies by Propertius. Scenes from Roman myth also appear in Roman wall painting, coins, and sculpture, particularly reliefs.

=== Founding myths ===
The Aeneid and Livy's early history are the best extant sources for Rome's founding myths. Material from Greek heroic legend was grafted onto this native stock at an early date. The Trojan prince Aeneas was cast as husband of Lavinia, daughter of King Latinus, patronymical ancestor of the Latini, and therefore through a convoluted revisionist genealogy as forebear of Romulus and Remus. By extension, the Trojans were adopted as the mythical ancestors of the Roman people.

=== Other myths ===
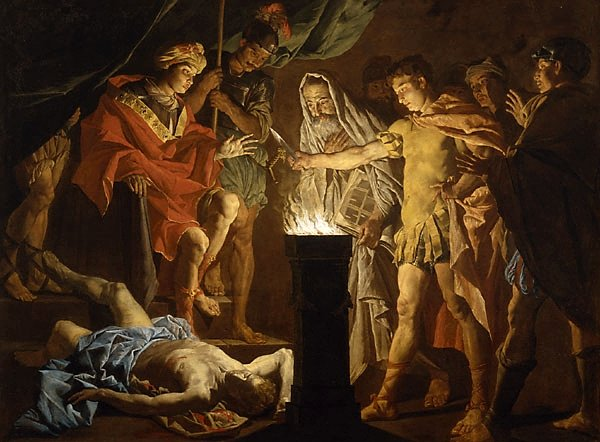
Mucius Scaevola in the Presence of Lars Porsenna (early 1640s) by Matthias Stom

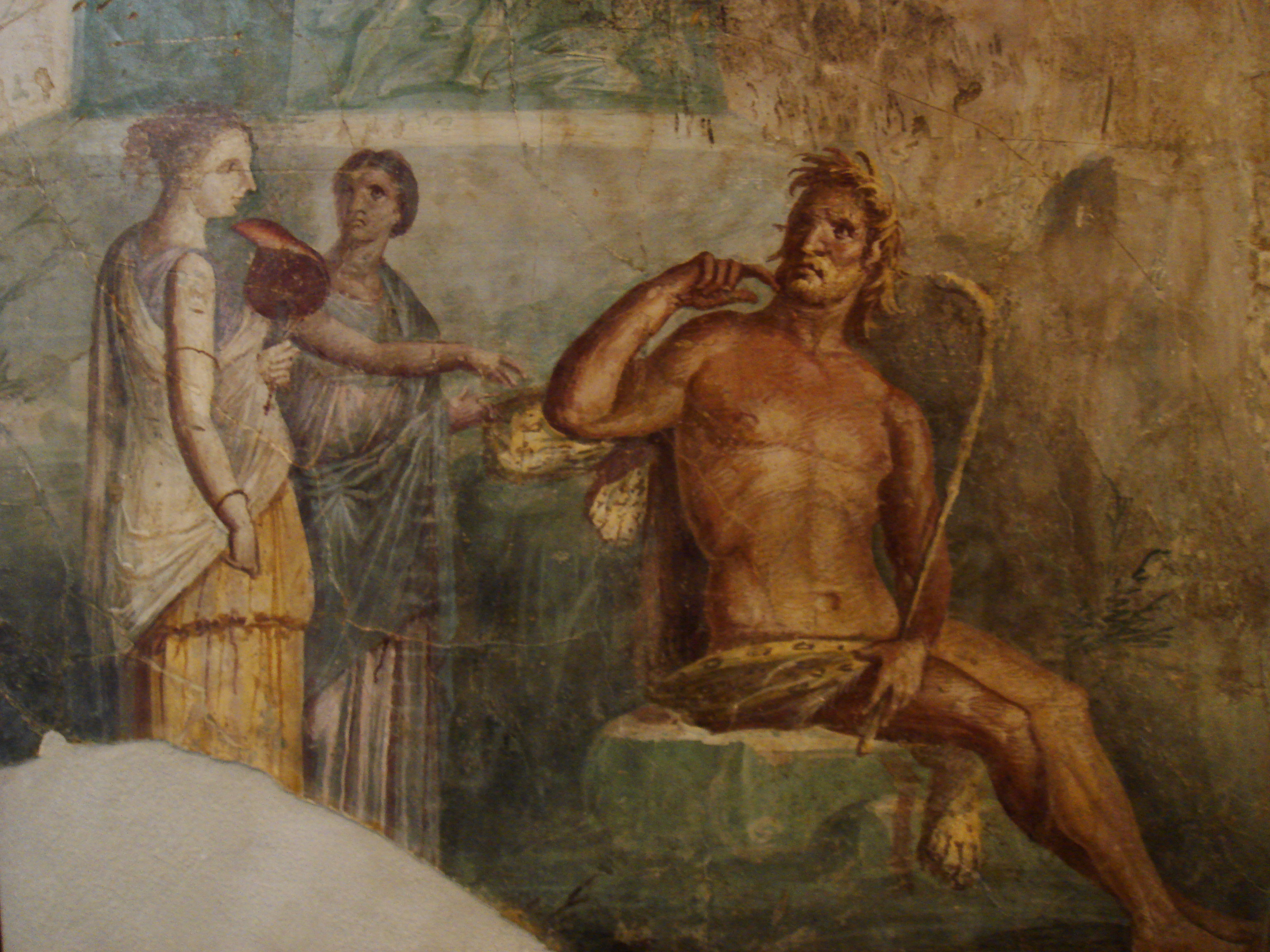
Polyphemus hears of the arrival of Galatea; ancient Roman fresco painted in the "Fourth Style" of Pompeii (45–79 AD)

The characteristic myths of Rome are often political or moral, that is, they deal with the development of Roman government in accordance with divine law, as expressed by Roman religion, and with demonstrations of the individual's adherence to moral expectations (mos maiorum) or failures to do so.

- Rape of the Sabine women, explaining the importance of the Sabines in the formation of Roman culture, and the growth of Rome through conflict and alliance.
- Numa Pompilius, the Sabine second king of Rome who consorted with the nymph Egeria and established many of Rome's legal and religious institutions.
- Servius Tullius, the sixth king of Rome, whose mysterious origins were freely mythologized and who was said to have been the lover of the goddess Fortuna.
- The Tarpeian Rock, and why it was used for the execution of traitors.
- Lucretia, whose self-sacrifice prompted the overthrow of the early Roman monarchy and led to the establishment of the Republic.
- Cloelia, a Roman woman taken hostage by Lars Porsena, who escaped but after negotiations returned voluntarily to save others and preserve the peace treaty.
- Horatius at the bridge, on the importance of individual valor.
- Mucius Scaevola, who thrust his right hand into the fire to prove his loyalty to Rome.
- Caeculus and the founding of Praeneste.
- Manlius and the geese, about divine intervention at the Gallic siege of Rome.
- Stories pertaining to the Nonae Caprotinae and Poplifugia festivals.
- Coriolanus, a story of politics and morality.
- The Etruscan city of Corythus as the "cradle" of Trojan and Italian civilization.
- The arrival of the Great Mother (Cybele) in Rome.

== Religion and myth ==
Narratives of divine activity played a more important role in the system of Greek religious belief than among the Romans, for whom ritual and cultus were primary. Although Roman religion was not based on scriptures and their exegesis, priestly literature was one of the earliest written forms of Latin prose. The books (libri) and commentaries (commentarii) of the College of Pontiffs and of the augurs contained religious procedures, prayers, and rulings and opinions on points of religious law. Although at least some of this archived material was available for consultation by the Roman senate, it was often occultum genus litterarum, an arcane form of literature to which by definition only priests had access. Prophecies pertaining to world history and to Rome's destiny turn up fortuitously at critical junctures in history, discovered suddenly in the nebulous Sibylline books, which Tarquin the Proud (according to legend) purchased in the late 6th century BC from the Cumaean Sibyl. Some aspects of archaic Roman religion survived in the lost theological works of the 1st-century BC scholar Varro, known through other classical and Christian authors.

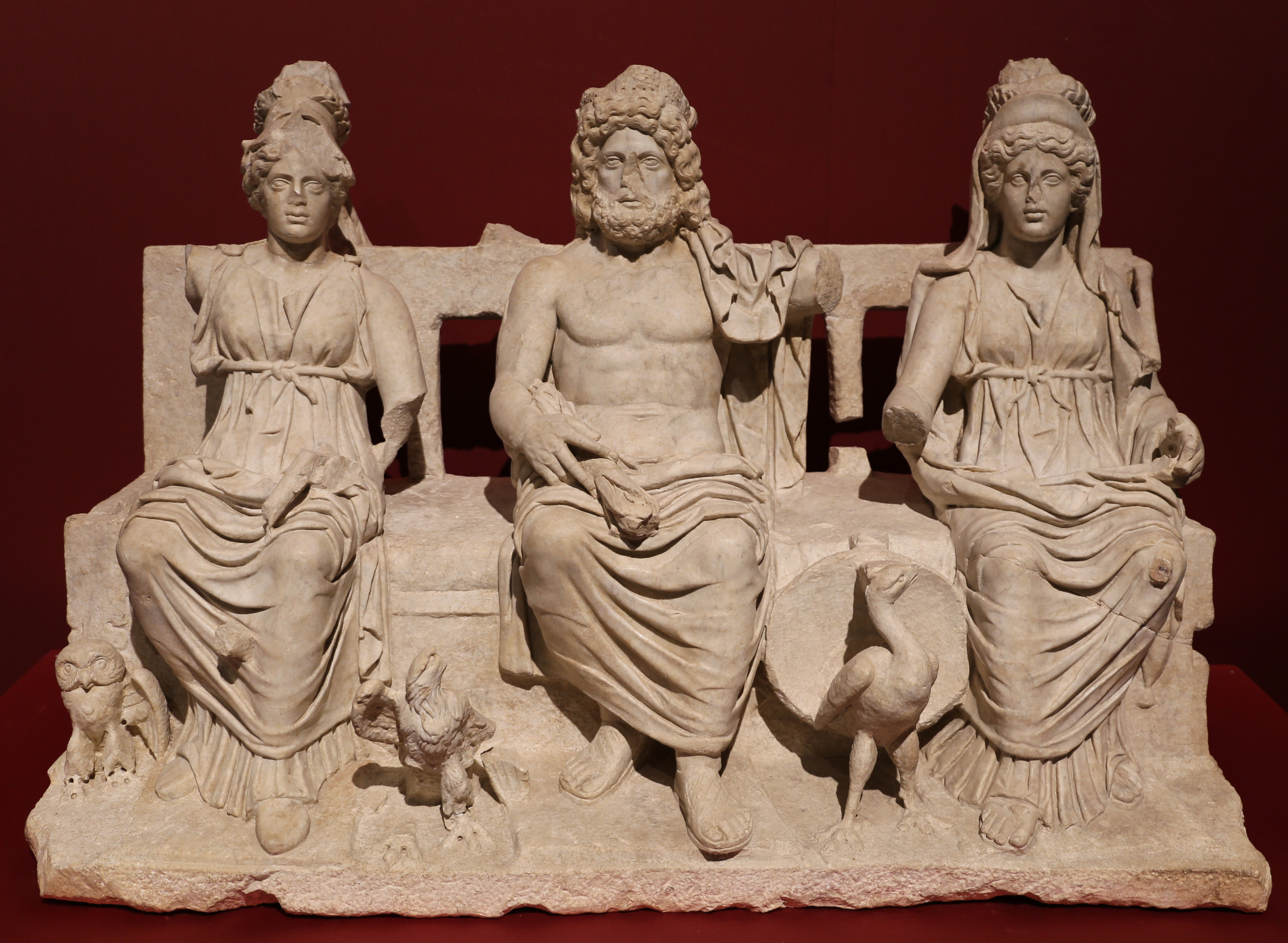
Capitoline Triad

Although traditional Roman religion was conservative in ritual rather than dogmatic in doctrine, the meaning of the rituals they perpetuated could be adapted, expanded, and reinterpreted by accretions of myths, etiologies, commentary, and the influences of other cultures in response to social change. The earliest pantheon included Janus, Vesta, and the so-called Archaic Triad of Jupiter, Mars, and Quirinus, whose three patrician flamens were of the highest order. According to tradition, Numa Pompilius, the Sabine second king of Rome, founded Roman religion; Numa was believed to have had as his consort and adviser a Roman goddess or nymph of fountains and of prophecy, Egeria. The Etruscan-influenced Capitoline Triad of Jupiter, Juno and Minerva later became central to official religion, replacing the Archaic Triad – an unusual example within Indo-European religion of a supreme triad formed of two female deities and only one male. The cult of Diana became established on the Aventine Hill, but the most famous Roman manifestation of this goddess may be Diana Nemorensis, owing to the attention paid to her cult by J.G. Frazer in the mythographic classic The Golden Bough. What modern scholars call the Aventine Triad – Ceres, Liber, and Libera – developed in association with the rise of plebeians to positions of wealth and influence.

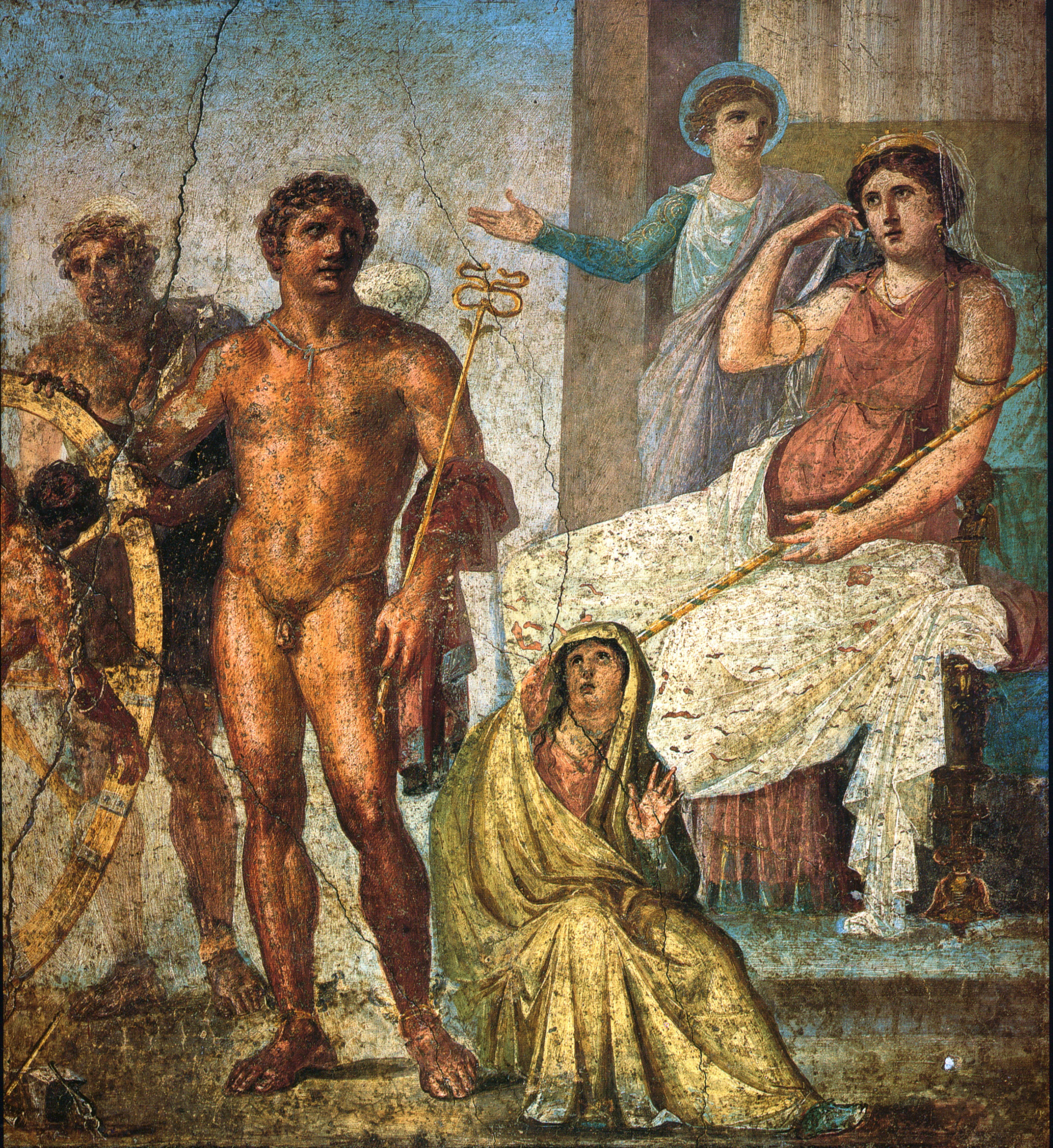
Punishment of Ixion: in the center stands Mercury holding the caduceus, and on the right Juno sits on her throne. Behind her Iris stands and gestures. On the left Vulcan (the blond figure) stands behind the wheel, manning it, with Ixion already tied to it. Nephele sits at Mercury's feet. – Roman fresco from the eastern wall of the triclinium in the House of the Vettii, Pompeii, Fourth Style (60–79 AD).

The gods represented distinctly the practical needs of daily life, and the Romans scrupulously accorded them the appropriate rites and offerings. Early Roman divinities included a host of "specialist gods" whose names were invoked in the carrying out of various specific activities. Fragments of old ritual accompanying such acts as plowing or sowing reveal that at every stage of the operation a separate deity was invoked, the name of each deity being regularly derived from the verb for the operation. Tutelary deities were particularly important in ancient Rome. Saturn was known as the father of Jupiter, Ceres, Pluto, Neptune, Juno, and Vesta.

Thus, Janus and Vesta guarded the door and hearth, the Lares protected the field and house, Pales the pasture, Saturn the sowing, Ceres the growth of the grain, Pomona the fruit, and Consus and Ops the harvest. Jupiter, the ruler of the gods, was honored for the aid his rains might give to the farms and vineyards. In his more encompassing character he was considered, through his weapon of lightning, the director of human activity. Owing to his widespread domain, the Romans regarded him as their protector in their military activities beyond the borders of their own community. Prominent in early times were the gods Mars and Quirinus, who were often identified with each other. Mars was a god of both war and agriculture; he was honored in March and October. Quirinus was the patron of the armed community in time of peace.

The 19th-century scholar Georg Wissowa thought that the Romans distinguished two classes of gods, the di indigetes and the di novensides or novensiles: the indigetes were the original gods of the Roman state, their names and nature indicated by the titles of the earliest priests and by the fixed festivals of the calendar, with 30 such gods honored by special festivals; the novensides were later divinities whose cults were introduced to the city in the historical period, usually at a known date and in response to a specific crisis or felt need. Arnaldo Momigliano and others, however, have argued that this distinction cannot be maintained. During the war with Hannibal, any distinction between "indigenous" and "immigrant" gods begins to fade, and the Romans embraced diverse gods from various cultures as a sign of strength and universal divine favor.

=== Foreign gods ===
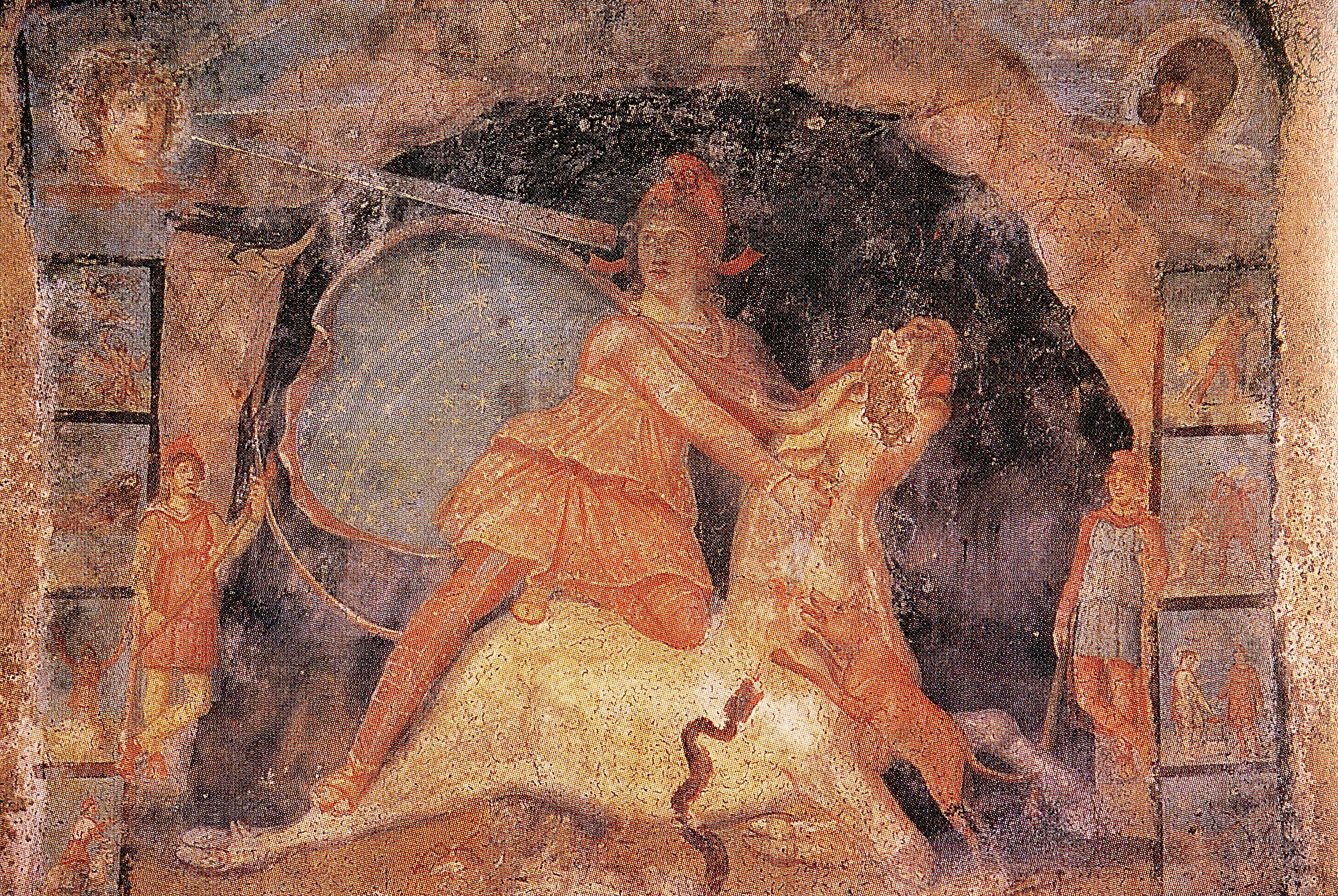
Mithras in a Roman wall painting

The absorption of neighboring local gods took place as the Roman state conquered neighboring territories. The Romans commonly granted the local gods of a conquered territory the same honors as the earlier gods of the Roman state religion. In addition to Castor and Pollux, the conquered settlements in Italy seem to have contributed to the Roman pantheon Diana, Minerva, Hercules, Venus, and deities of lesser rank, some of whom were Italic divinities, others originally derived from the Greek culture of Magna Graecia. In 203 BC, Rome imported the cult object embodying Cybele from Pessinus in Phrygia and welcomed its arrival with due ceremony. Both Lucretius and Catullus, poets contemporary in the mid-1st century BC, offer disapproving glimpses of Cybele's wildly ecstatic cult.

In some instances, deities of an enemy power were formally invited through the ritual of evocatio to take up their abode in new sanctuaries at Rome.

Communities of foreigners (peregrini) and former slaves (libertini) continued their own religious practices within the city. In this way Mithras came to Rome and his popularity within the Roman army spread his cult as far afield as Roman Britain. The important Roman deities were eventually identified with the more anthropomorphic Greek gods and goddesses, and assumed many of their attributes and myths.

== Astronomy ==
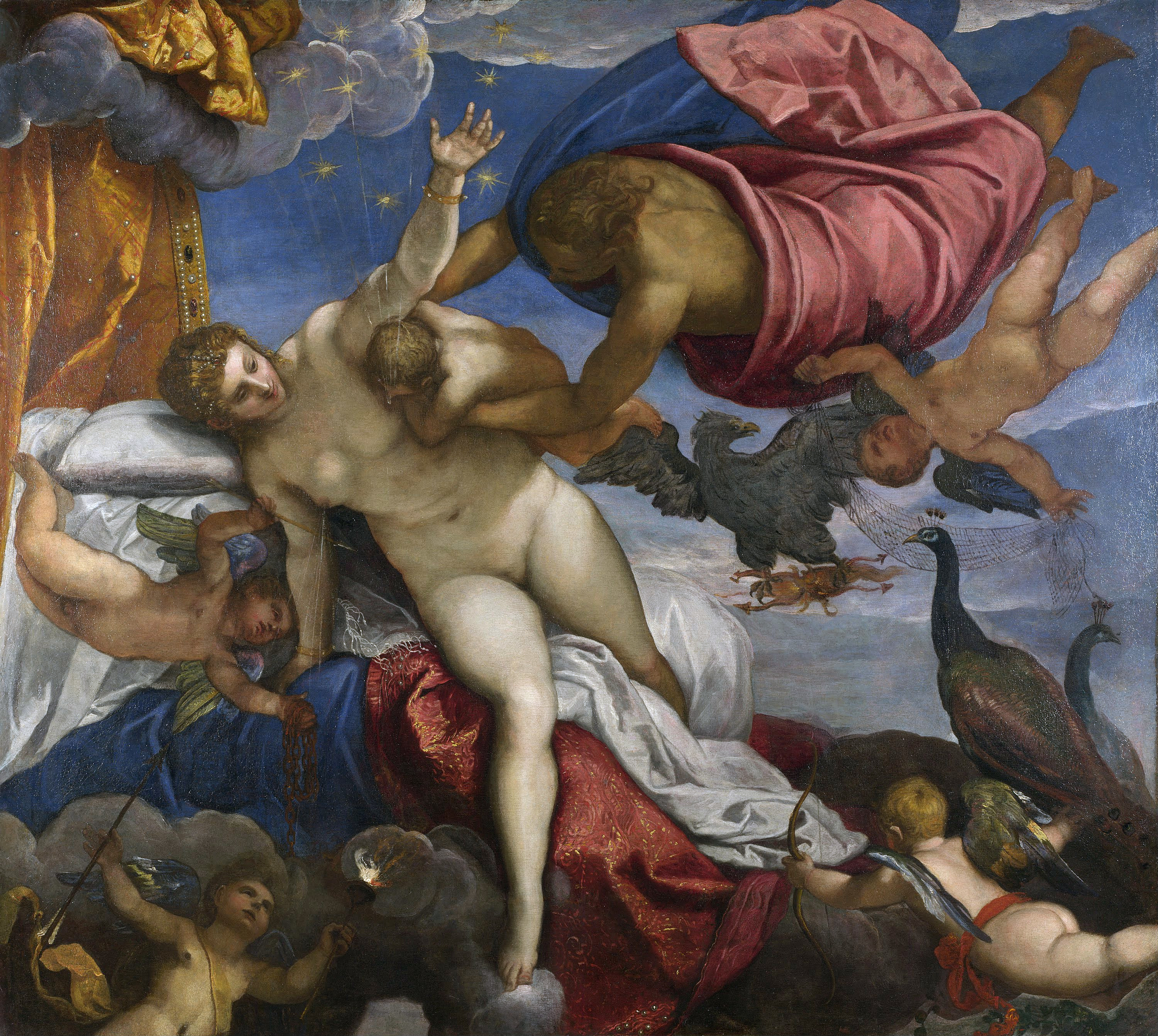
The Origin of the Milky Way (c. 1575–1580) by Tintoretto

Many astronomical objects are named after Roman deities, like the planets Mercury, Venus, Mars, Jupiter, Saturn, and Neptune.

In Roman and Greek mythology, Jupiter places his son born by a mortal woman, the infant Hercules, on Juno's breast while she is asleep so the baby will drink her divine milk and thus become immortal, an act which would endow the baby with godlike qualities. When Juno woke and realized that she was breastfeeding an unknown infant, she pushed him away, some of her milk spills, and the spurting milk became the Milky Way. In another version of the myth, the abandoned Hercules is given by Minerva to Juno for feeding, but Hercules' forcefulness causes Minerva to rip him from her breast in pain. The milk that squirts out forms the Milky Way.

== See also ==
- List of Ovid's Metamorphoses characters
- List of Roman deities
- Mythology of Italy
- Roman Polytheistic Reconstructionism
- Pillar of Yzeures-sur-Creuse

== Sources ==
- Beard, Mary. 1993. "Looking (Harder) for Roman Myth: Dumézil, Declamation, and the Problems of Definition." In Mythos in Mythenloser Gesellschaft: Das Paradigma Roms. Edited by Fritz Graf, 44–64. Stuttgart, Germany: Teubner.
- Braund, David, and Christopher Gill, eds. 2003. Myth, History, and Culture in Republican Rome: Studies in Honour of T. P. Wiseman. Exeter, UK: Univ. of Exeter Press.
- Cameron, Alan. 2004. Greek Mythography in the Roman World. Oxford: Oxford Univ. Press.
- Dumézil, Georges. 1996. Archaic Roman Religion. Rev. ed. Translated by Philip Krapp. Baltimore: Johns Hopkins Univ. Press.
- Fox, Matthew. 2011. "The Myth of Rome" In A Companion to Greek Mythology. Blackwell Companions to the Ancient World. Literature and Culture.Edited by Ken Dowden and Niall Livingstone. Chichester; Malden, MA: Wiley-Blackwell.
- Gardner, Jane F. 1993. Roman Myths: The Legendary Past. Austin: Univ. of Texas Press.
- Grandazzi, Alexandre. 1997. The Foundation of Rome: Myth and History. Translated by Jane Marie Todd. Ithaca, NY: Cornell Univ. Press.
- Hall, Edith 2013. "Pantomime: Visualising Myth in the Roman Empire." In Performance in Greek and Roman Theatre. Edited by George Harrison and George William Mallory, 451–743. Leiden; Boston: Brill.
- Miller, Paul Allen. 2013. "Mythology and the Abject in Imperial Satire." In Classical Myth and Psychoanalysis: Ancient and Modern Stories of the Self. Edited by Vanda Zajko and Ellen O'Gorman, 213–230. Oxford; New York: Oxford University Press.
- Newby, Zahra. 2012. "The Aesthetics of Violence: Myth and Danger in Roman Domestic Landscapes." Classical Antiquity 31.2: 349–389.
- Wiseman, T. P. 2004. The Myths of Rome. Exeter: Univ. of Exeter Press.
- Woodard, Roger D. 2013. Myth, Ritual, and the Warrior in Roman and Indo-European Antiquity. Cambridge; New York: Cambridge University Press.
