= Understanding and Addressing Adult Sexual Attraction to Children =

2009 book

Understanding and Addressing Adult Sexual Attraction to Children: A Study of Paedophiles in Contemporary Society
- Author: Sarah D. Goode
- Genre: Nonfiction
- Publisher: Routledge
- Publication date: 2009
- Pages: 240
- ISBN: 978-0415446266

Understanding and Addressing Adult Sexual Attraction to Children: A Study of Paedophiles in Contemporary Society is a 2009 book by British sociologist Sarah D. Goode. The book examines autobiographical accounts and data of pedophile men and women who are members of online communities.

The book provides conclusions from surveys, questionnaires and interviews conducted by Goode on 54 men and 2 women of differing nationalities. Throughout the book, Goode presents their positive and negative evaluations of themselves, how they construe their own identities, how they get support among themselves and others, their attitudes on pornography and sexual interactions with children, as well as the problems they have encountered while navigating society.
