= Glynis Breakwell =

Former Vice-Chancellor of the University of Bath

Dame Glynis Marie Breakwell DBE DL FRSA FAcSS (born West Bromwich, 26 July 1952) is a British social psychologist, researcher and former Vice-Chancellor of the University of Bath. In January 2014 she was listed in the Science Council's list of '100 leading UK practising scientists'. Her tenure as Vice-Chancellor of the University of Bath was marred by controversy over her remuneration, culminating in her dismissal.

Breakwell has been a Fellow of the British Psychological Society since 1987 and an Honorary Fellow since 2006. She is a chartered health psychologist and in 2002 was elected an Academician of the Academy of Social Sciences.

Breakwell was appointed Dame Commander of the Order of the British Empire in the 2012 New Year Honours for services to higher education. She is also a Deputy Lieutenant of the County of Somerset.

== Early life and education ==
Breakwell was born on 26 July 1952 in West Bromwich, England. She graduated from the University of Leicester with a Bachelor of Arts (BA) degree in 1973, the University of Strathclyde with a Master of Science (MSc) degree in 1974, the University of Bristol with a Doctor of Philosophy (PhD) degree in 1976. Her doctoral thesis was titled "The mechanisms of social identity". Later, in 1995, she was awarded a Doctor of Science (DSc) degree, a higher doctorate, by Nuffield College, Oxford.

In 2002, she lived in a five-bedroom house at Lansdown Crescent. After her dismissal from the Vice-Chancellorship, the house was then up for sale for £3,000,000.

== Academic career ==
- 1976–1978 Lecturer in social psychology, University of Bradford
- 1978–1982 Prize Fellow in social psychology, Nuffield College, Oxford
- 1978 BPS Young Social Psychologist Award
- 1984 Associate Fellow
- 1987 Fellow
- 1993 Myers Award
- 1995–1999 Member Social Psychology Section Committee (Chair 1997–1999)
- 1978 MA (by special resolution) University of Oxford
- 2006 Honorary Fellow of the British Psychological Society
- 2014 Science Council list of 100 leading UK practising Scientists

University of Surrey

- 1981–1987 Lecturer in social psychology
- 1987–1988 Reader
- 1991–2001 Professor of Psychology
- 1990–1995 Head of Department of Psychology
- 1994–1995 Pro Vice-Chancellor (Staff Development and Continuing Education)
- 1995–2001 Head of School of Human Sciences

University of Bath

- 2001–2019 Vice-Chancellor, University of Bath

Shandong University, China

- Honorary Professor

== Current appointments ==
- Non executive director, NHS Improvement
- Member of the Science & Technology Honours Committee

== Criticism of excessive pay ==
In 2016, former education minister Lord Adonis called for an inquiry in the House of Lords as he criticised the "serious controversy" of salary increases awarded to Breakwell as the Vice-Chancellor of the University of Bath. A pay rise of 11%, well above the 1.1% cap on pay for non-managerial staff across the higher education sector, took her yearly earnings to £451,000. "Put all that together, and Glynis Breakwell is paid almost exactly half a million pounds, more than three times the prime minister's salary" said Lord Adonis.

It was also reported around the same time by a freedom of information request submitted by Bath councillor Joe Rayment that Breakwell claimed an extra £20,000 in domestic expenses despite living in a grace-and-favour property owned by the university.

In protest against Breakwell's pay package, four MPs resigned from the university court (advisory board) for the University of Bath: Darren Jones, Kerry McCarthy, David Drew, and Andrew Murrison. Critics speculated that the controversy surrounding Breakwell's salary had led to a decline in applications; the university suffered an 18.5% drop in applications from non-EU applicants for the 2018 entry, and an overall 6% drop against an 11.5% jump in applications for Bath's six closest competitors.

A freedom of information request by the Bath Chronicle revealed Breakwell secured a further 3.9% pay rise in the 2016–2017 academic year, raising her total wages and benefits to more than £468,000. This led Adonis to refer to her pay rise – awarded whilst she herself was a member of the remuneration committee that set her salary – as a "disgrace" and to call for her to resign. In response, Breakwell issued a statement saying "The university is committed to the highest standards of governance and treats very seriously any complaint made." Breakwell stepped down from the remuneration committee in October 2017 during a series of reforms described as "largely worthless" in a joint statement from unions. One month later, University of Bath students overwhelmingly passed a motion of no confidence in the university's governance in relation to Council and Remuneration committee.

Addressing the issue of her salary in a 2015 interview, Breakwell stated: "I'm worth it...I've been in the job a long time and you do tend to get increases over time in most jobs. Frankly, I don't think that there is anything I could say that would stop people saying that I earn too much and vice-chancellors earn too much, so I cannot engage in a conversation because I don't think there is a way through."

=== Response ===
On 28 November 2017 Breakwell announced that she would step down as vice-chancellor on 31 August 2018, at the end of the 2017–18 academic year, and take a fully paid sabbatical semester before formally retiring on 28 February 2019. As part of the terms of her resignation, the university wrote off the interest-free loan for her £31,000 car which she kept.

Lord Adonis called the terms of her resignation "outrageous" and that she was the worst case of "fat-cat pay", saying the sabbatical meant that she would be paid £700,000 to go. A joint statement from trade unions representing staff at the University of Bath urged for Breakwell's resignation to be effective immediately, citing concerns over Breakwell continuing to exercise authority which generated a "climate of fear" on campus. On 16 January 2018, the university court voted in favour for the immediate dismissal of Breakwell.

== Publications ==
- Breakwell, Glynis; Rowett, Colin (1982). Social Work: The Social Psychological Approach. Van Nostrand Reinhold. ISBN 0442305192.
- Breakwell, Glynis (1985). The Quiet Rebel. Century. ISBN 071260717X.
- Breakwell, Glynis (1986). Coping with Threatened Identities. Sydney: Law Book Co of Australasia. ISBN 0416371205.
- Breakwell, Glynis (1989). Facing Physical Violence. Routledge. ISBN 0901715956.
- Breakwell, Glynis (1990). Interviewing (Problems in Practice). BPS Blackwell. ISBN 978-1854330000.
- Banks, Michael; Bates, Inge; Breakwell, Glynis; Bynner, John M.; Emler, Nicholas; Jamieson, Lynn; Roberts, Kenneth B. (1991). Careers and Identities. Open University Press. ISBN 978-0335097142.
- Breakwell, Glynis (1991). Social Psychology of Political and Economic Cognition. Academic Press Inc. ISBN 978-0121286804.
- Rowett, Colin; Breakwell, Glynis (1992). Managing Violence at Work. NFER-Nelson. ASIN B0018LSXWM.
- Breakwell, Glynis (1992). Social Psychology of Identity and the Self Concept. Academic Press Inc. ISBN 978-0121286859.
- Breakwell, Glynis; Canter, David (1993). Empirical Approaches to Social Representations. Clarendon Press. ISBN 978-0198521815.
- Breakwell, Glynis; Millard, L. (1995). Basic Evaluation Methods: Analysing Performance, Practice and Procedure. John Wiley & Sons. ISBN 978-1854331618.
- Breakwell, Glynis; Lyons, Evanthia (1996). Changing European Identities: Social Psychological Analyses of Social Change. Garland Science. ISBN 978-0750630085.
- Breakwell, Glynis (1997). Coping with Aggressive Behaviour (Personal and Professional Development). John Wiley & Sons. ISBN 978-1854332059.
- Breakwell, Glynis (2003). Doing Social Psychology Research. Wiley-Blackwell. ISBN 978-1405108126.
- Breakwell, Glynis (2003). Doing Social Psychology Research. Wiley-Blackwell. ISBN 978-1405108126.
- Breakwell, Glynis; Smith, Jonathan A.; Wright, Daniel B. (2012). Research Methods in Psychology (4 ed.). SAGE Publications Ltd. ISBN 978-0857022646.
- Breakwell, Glynis (2014). The Psychology of Risk (2 ed.). Cambridge University Press. ISBN 978-1107602700.
- Jaspal, Rusi; Breakwell, Glynis (2014). Identity Process Theory: Identity, Social Action and Social Change. Cambridge University Press. ISBN 978-1107022706.

Academic offices
Preceded by David VandeLinde	Vice-Chancellor of the University of Bath; 2001–2018	Succeeded by Ian H. White
