= Electronics Letters =

- Discipline: Electronics
- Language: English

Publication details
- History: 1965–present
- Publisher: Institution of Engineering and Technology
- Frequency: Biweekly

Standard abbreviations
- ISO 4: Electron. Lett.

Indexing
- ISSN: 0013-5194
- OCLC no.: 1567764

Links
- Journal homepage

Electronics Letters is a peer-reviewed scientific journal published biweekly by the Institution of Engineering and Technology. It specializes in the rapid publication of short communications on all areas of electronic engineering, including optical, communication, and biomedical engineering, as well as electronic circuits and signal processing.

In 2010 Electronics Letters was relaunched with a new section at the start of each issue. This section focuses on selected papers within the issue, providing expanded context and background to the research reported, through magazine-style news articles and interviews with the researchers behind the work. The articles are designed to be accessible to a general engineering audience and were made available free of charge, without a subscription, from the journal's website.

In 2013 a hybrid open-access model was introduced providing authors whose papers have been accepted for publication with an open access publication option.

== History ==
In 1965, the British engineer and professor Peter Clarricoats, along with the association of Institution of Electrical Engineers, pioneered a peer-reviewed platform out of the necessity to quickly disseminate the latest researches in the field of electrical and electronic engineering. He became the first editor-in-chief of Electronics Letters. At present, professor Ian H. White, Head of Photonics Research at the University of Cambridge and professor Chris Toumazou of Imperial College London are the editors-in-chief of Electronics Letters.
