= Ian H. White =

British engineer (born 1959)

Professor Ian H. White CBE DL FREng
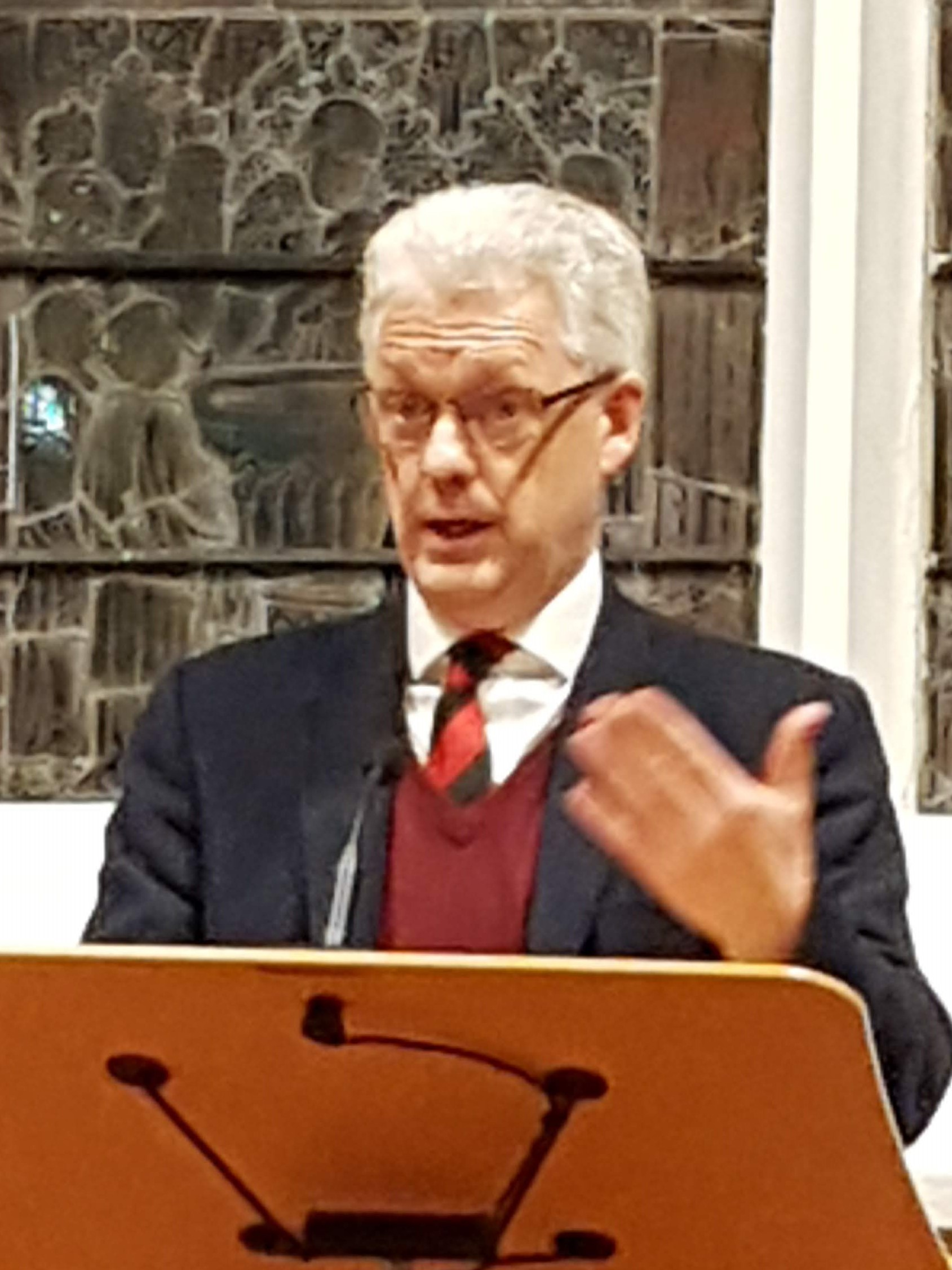
- Ian White speaking at 2018 Faraday Institute reception

Vice-Chancellor of the University of Bath
- In office April 2019 – July 2024
- Preceded by: Glynis Breakwell
- Succeeded by: Phil Taylor

Personal details
- Born: 6 October 1959 (age 66)
- Education: Belfast Royal Academy
- Alma mater: Jesus College, Cambridge (BA), (PhD)
- Profession: Engineer
- Salary: £311,347 (2021–22)

Ian Hugh White (born 6 October 1959) is a British engineer. His previous roles include vice-chancellor of the University of Bath, Master of Jesus College, Cambridge, deputy vice chancellor of the University of Cambridge, van Eck Professor of Engineering, and head of the Photonic Research Group, comprising CMMPE, Centre for Photonic Systems, and Photonics and Sensors, in the Cambridge University Engineering Department.

== Biography ==
Ian White was educated at the Belfast Royal Academy and Jesus College, Cambridge, where he gained his BA and PhD degrees in 1980 and 1984. He was then appointed a research fellow and assistant lecturer at the University of Cambridge before becoming professor of physics at the University of Bath in 1990. In 1996 he moved to the University of Bristol and became head of the Department of Electrical and Electronic Engineering in 1998, before returning to the University of Cambridge in October 2001.

While in Cambridge he served in the roles of master of Jesus College, head of the School of Technology, and pro-vice-chancellor for institutional affairs. He was a key member of the UK-China Global Issues Dialogue Centre at Cambridge, which was funded by Huawei and active in the 2010s. Critics attributed White's involvement with the centre as a contributing factor to Cambridge's silence over the Chinese government's increasing encroachment on academic freedom in the late 2010s.

In 2018, White retired from the mastership of Jesus College to become vice-chancellor of the University of Bath. He accepted a salary that was about half of his predecessor's, a move praised by student and staff unions as a positive development in tackling excessive pay gaps in academia.

White is a Christian. He is associated with the Faraday Institute for Science and Religion at Cambridge University and gave a keynote on living a Christian life as an academic scientist in 2018.

== Optoelectronic research ==
Ian White has built up a substantial research activity in the field of optoelectronics and optical communications and his team numbers approximately 45 people publishing on average 60 papers a year. In terms of research output, the group is one of the largest in the field of optoelectronic systems in the UK. Highlights of his research have included: the development of the first all-optical laser diode flip-flop, the first negative chirp electroabsorption modulator and the invention of a technique for transmitting radio frequency signals over long distances of multimode optical fibre. Several of these advances have already made commercial impact, the offset launch technique for enhancing the bandwidth of optical fibre links having already been adopted within Gigabit Ethernet standard.

He chairs the channel model sub-task force of the IEEE 10 GbE LRM standard. The Institution of Electrical Engineers has awarded him the Blumlein-Browne-Willans Prize and the Ambrose Fleming Premium Award.

White is a Fellow of the Royal Academy of Engineering and of the Institution of Electrical Engineers and Institute of Electrical and Electronics Engineers. He is heavily involved in policy development and administration of research and sits on a number of International Conference Committees. He is a member of the board of governors of the IEEE Photonics Society and editor-in-chief of Electronics Letters. He has published over 800 journal and conference papers and 20 patents.

Academic offices
Preceded by Robert Mair	Master of Jesus College, Cambridge; 2011–2019	Succeeded by Sonita Alleyne
Preceded by Glynis Breakwell	Vice Chancellor, University of Bath; 2019–present	Succeeded by incumbent
