= Sarah D. Goode =

British sociologist, writer

Sarah Dalal Goode
- Occupations: Sociologist, writer, businessperson

Academic background
- Education: University of Warwick (MA, PhD)

Academic work
- Discipline: Sociology
- Sub-discipline: Paedophilia
- Institutions: University of Winchester

Sarah Dalal Goode (born 1960) is a British sociologist, writer, and businessperson. She is a former Honorary Researcher and Coordinator of the Center for Research and Policy for the Study of Community Welfare at the University of Winchester. She is the author of books including Understanding and addressing adult sexual attraction to children and Paedophiles in Society, in which she analyses the situation of paedophilia in contemporary Western society.

== Education ==
Goode trained as a paediatric occupational therapist, going on to study an MA in Sociological Research in Healthcare at the University of Warwick before studying for a PhD in sociology. Her PhD thesis, which she completed in 1999, was titled Substance-using mothers: taking control, losing control: The everyday lives of drug and alcohol-dependent mothers in West Midlands, and was supervised by Ellen Annandale.

== Career ==
Goode worked as a lecturer at the Warwick Medical School and was a senior lecturer at the University of Winchester, leading the Research and Policy Centre for the Study of Wellbeing in Communities.

Her work was featured in a Channel Four documentary, and she has appeared in interviews on ITV and the BBC.

Goode has praised the work of the Prevention Project Dunkelfeld and the Lucy Faithfull Foundation. Whilst being critical of practices such as chemical castration and critical of current clinical psychiatric criteria, believing them to be too narrow.

In her book Understanding and addressing adult sexual attraction to children, presents case studies based on interviews she conducted with pedophiles. She uses these case studies, as well as previous studies to counteract some of the false beliefs and alarmism that developed in the late 1970s in the United States, and in the early 1980s in Europe.

== Books ==
- Sarah D. Goode (2010), Understanding and addressing adult sexual attraction to children: a study of paedophiles in contemporary society, London/New York: Routledge, ISBN 9780415446266
- Sarah D. Goode (2011), Paedophiles in society: reflecting on sexuality, abuse and hope, Basingstoke: Palgrave Macmillan, ISBN 9780230271883
