= Mary Turner (businesswoman) =

British businesswoman (born 1958)

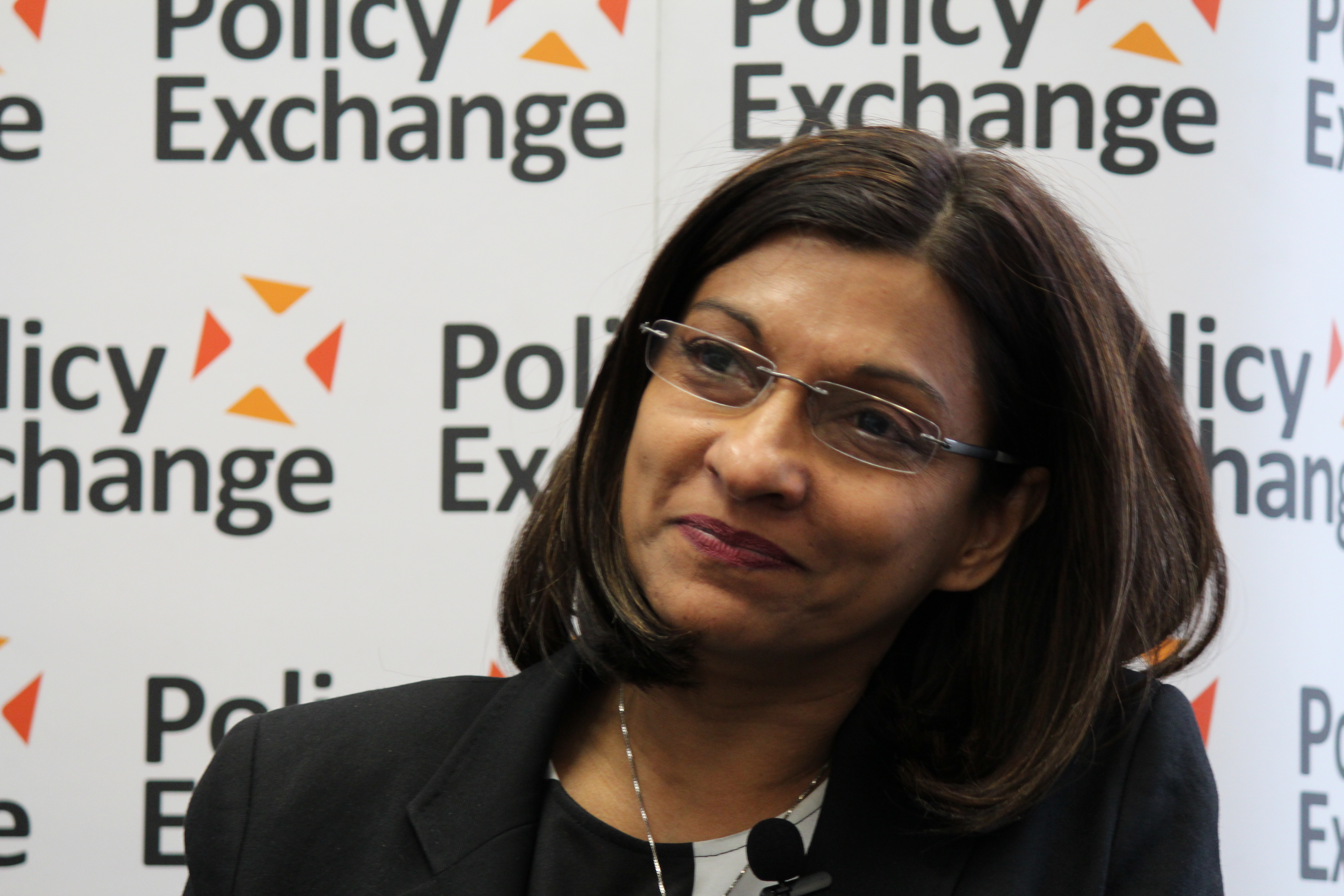
- Born: April 1958 (age 68); Malaysia
- Education: University of Birmingham; University of Warwick
- Occupation: Businesswoman
- Known for: CEO of Koovs

Mary Turner (born April 1958) is a business executive who has been CEO of Koovs since October 2015.

== Early life ==
Born in Malaysia, she graduated from the University of Birmingham with a BSc in Management in 1982 and subsequently completed an MBA at the University of Warwick. She married Martin Turner in 1990, and has one son Samuel Turner.

== Career ==
In 2001, Turner became managing director of LineOne. Tiscali purchased LineOne in 2001 and Turner became chief executive of Tiscali UK in 2003. Turner was named CEO of AlertMe in March 2010. From September 2009 to December 2013, she served as a Non-Executive Director of ASOS.com. In July 2015, Turner was appointed CEO of Koovs.
