= Athina Anastasaki =

Greek chemist and academic

- Born: 1988 (age 37–38); Athens, Greece
- Education: National and Kapodistrian University of Athens; University of Warwick
- Scientific career
- Institutions: University of California, Santa Barbara; ETH Zurich
- Thesis: Shining a light on copper mediated living radical polymerisation : maximising end-group fidelity (2014)
- Doctoral advisor: David Haddleton

Athina Anastasaki (Greek: Αθηνά Αναστασάκη; born 1988) is a Greek chemist who is a professor at ETH Zurich. Her research considers chemical synthesis and radical polymerisation. She was awarded the 2022 Ruzicka Prize in recognition of her research in chemistry.

== Early life and education ==
Anastasaki was born in Athens, Greece. Her parents are from Crete. She completed her undergraduate studies in chemistry at the National and Kapodistrian University of Athens, where she studied polymer chemistry, with a particular focus on poly(methyl methacrylate). She moved to the University of Warwick where she worked with David Haddleton. She was awarded the Royal Society of Chemistry Jon Weaver Award for the UK's best PhD in Polymer chemistry. Her doctoral research considered copper mediated living radical polymerisation. After completing her doctorate, she was made a research fellow in pharmaceutical sciences. Anastasaki was awarded an Elings Fellowship and a Global Marie Curie Fellowship to work with Craig Hawker at University of California, Santa Barbara.

== Research and career ==
Anastasaki joined the Department of Materials at ETH Zurich in 2019. She became an associate editor of Polymer Chemistry in 2021. Her research considers polymer synthesis and green chemistry.

Anastasaki developed a new approach to control the disparity of polymeric materials that preserved the ends of polymer chains. This strategy, which involved a switchable RAFT (Reversible addition−fragmentation chain-transfer) agent, permits the synthesis of complex, multi-block polymers. She has also shown it is possible to regenerate the monomers of Plexiglass (poly(methyl methacrylate)) up to a 90% yield.

Anastasaki wrote a perspective on applying for a European Research Council Starting Grant for Angewandte Chemie. She outlined her "first two unsuccessful attempts to secure an ERC Starting Grant and how the lessons learned during the process led [her] to ultimately secure a grant upon [her] third attempt".

== Awards and honours ==
- 2020 Hanwha-Total IUPAC Young Scientist Award
- 2020 ERC Starting Grant
- 2022 ETH Zurich Ruzicka Prize
- 2022 EuChemS Lecture Award

== Selected publications ==
- Athina Anastasaki; Vasiliki Nikolaou; Gabit Nurumbetov; et al. (30 July 2015). "Cu(0)-Mediated Living Radical Polymerization: A Versatile Tool for Materials Synthesis". Chemical Reviews. 116 (3): 835–877. doi:10.1021/ACS.CHEMREV.5B00191. ISSN 0009-2665. PMID 26226544. Wikidata Q34487580.
- Athina Anastasaki; Vasiliki Nikolaou; Qiang Zhang; et al. (9 January 2014). "Copper(II)/tertiary amine synergy in photoinduced living radical polymerization: accelerated synthesis of ω-functional and α,ω-heterofunctional poly(acrylates)". Journal of the American Chemical Society. 136 (3): 1141–1149. doi:10.1021/JA411780M. ISSN 0002-7863. PMID 24372509. Wikidata Q57375342.
- Qiang Zhang; Paul Wilson; Zaidong Li; Ronan McHale; Jamie Godfrey; Athina Anastasaki; Christopher Waldron; David Haddleton (1 May 2013). "Aqueous copper-mediated living polymerization: exploiting rapid disproportionation of CuBr with Me6TREN". Journal of the American Chemical Society. 135 (19): 7355–7363. doi:10.1021/JA4026402. ISSN 0002-7863. PMID 23597244. Wikidata Q46618285.
