= Expert Opinion on Drug Delivery =

- Discipline: Pharmaceutics
- Language: English
- Edited by: Uday Kompella

Publication details
- History: 2004-present
- Publisher: Taylor and Francis Group
- Frequency: Monthly
- Impact factor: 6.6 (2022)

Standard abbreviations
- ISO 4: Expert Opin. Drug Deliv.

Indexing
- CODEN: EODDAW
- ISSN: 1742-5247 (print); 1744-7593 (web)
- OCLC no.: 60630038

Links
- Journal homepage; Online access; Online archive

Expert Opinion on Drug Delivery is a monthly peer-reviewed medical journal publishing review articles covering all aspects of research on drug delivery, from initial concept to potential therapeutic application and final relevance in clinical use. It was established in 2004 and is published by Taylor and Francis Group. The editor-in-chief is Uday Kompella (University of Colorado).

== Abstracting and indexing ==
The journal is abstracted and indexed in Chemical Abstracts, EMBASE/Excerpta Medica, MEDLINE/Index Medicus, and the Science Citation Index Expanded. According to the Journal Citation Reports, the journal has a 2022 impact factor of 6.6.
