= Victor Bailey (historian) =

British historian, author, and academic (born 1948)

Prof. Victor Bailey FRHistS
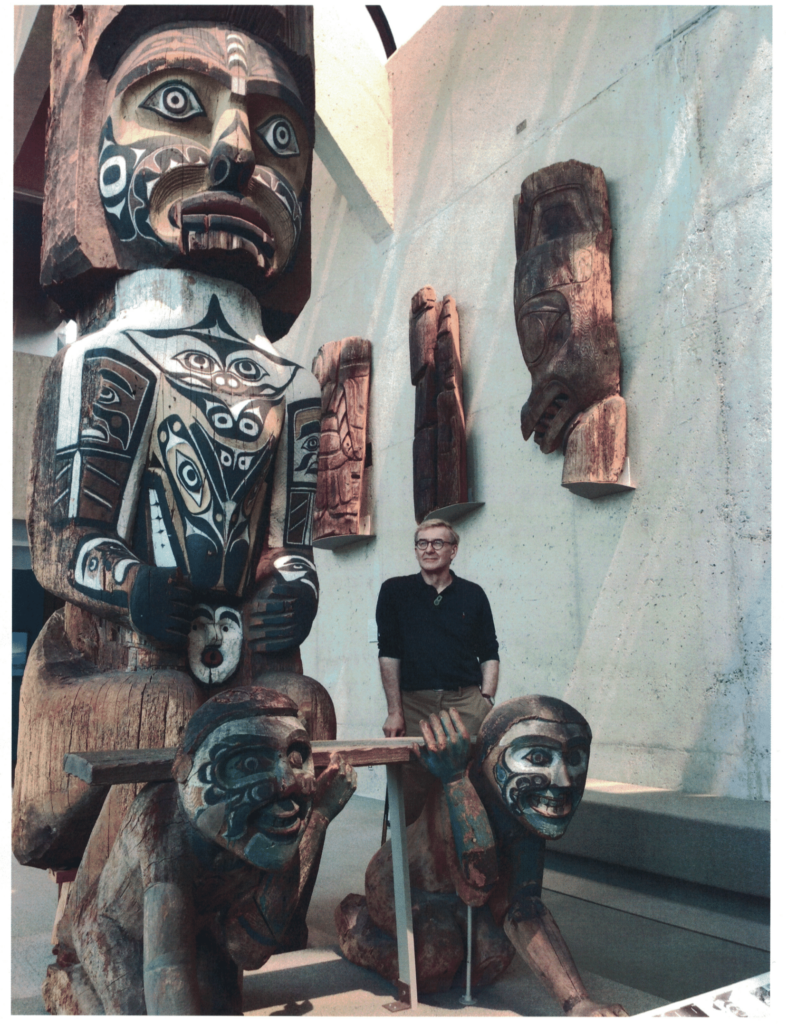
- Bailey in 2015
- Born: 14 August 1948 (age 78); Keighley, England
- Occupations: Historian, academic, author, editor
- Years active: 1973-present
- Title: Charles W. Battey Distinguished Professor
- Board member of: The Consortium of Humanities Centers and Institutes (2006-2011)
- Spouse: Ann Kathryn Bailey
- Awards: National Endowment for the Humanities University Fellowship (1990)

Academic background
- Education: Keighley Boys’ Grammar School (1959-1966); University of Warwick (1966-1969); Institute of Criminology, University of Cambridge (1969-1970); Centre for the Study of Social History, University of Warwick (1970-1973)
- Alma mater: University of Warwick
- Thesis: The Dangerous Classes in Late Victorian England: Reflections on the Social Foundations of Disturbance and Order (1975)
- Doctoral advisor: E. P. Thompson, Royden Harrison

Academic work
- Discipline: History
- Sub-discipline: Modern British history
- Institutions: University of Kansas
- Main interests: Prisons, punishment, police, crime, social history, juvenile delinquency, Margaret Thatcher on British politics
- Notable works: Nineteenth-Century Crime and Punishment (2021)
- Website: www.victorbailey.net

Victor Bailey (born 14 August 1948) is a British social and legal historian, author, editor and academic. Bailey is the Charles W. Battey Distinguished Professor of Modern British History at the University of Kansas' Department of History since 2007, and the director of its Joyce & Elizabeth Hall Center for the Humanities for seventeen years from 2000 to 2017. He is credited with editing and authoring some of the best volumes in nineteenth century British history, criminal law, policing, and punishment. His work "Nineteenth-Century Crime and Punishment" is divided into four volumes. Edited by Bailey with separate extensive explanatory notes, and published by Routledge in 2021, the four volumes are more than 1500 pages long in which Bailey covers almost everything about crime and punishment from 1776 to 1914. In his review of the four volumes, Simon Devereaux (Note: from the University of Victoria) described Bailey as "a scholar who, with Martin Wiener, stands preeminent amongst historians of crime, society, and punishment in modern England." Bailey was awarded the Walter D. Love Prize of the North American Conference on British Studies (Note: For best article in British history by a North American scholar) (1998), the W. T. Kemper Fellowship for Teaching Excellence (1999) and the Marquis Who's Who's Lifetime Achievement Award.

Bailey is a native of Yorkshire. He was born in Keighley in 1948 where he later attended the Keighley Boys’ Grammar School. He earned a BA in European History from the University of Warwick in 1969, and a Diploma in Criminology from the University of Cambridge's Institute of Criminology in 1970. Bailey studied at the Centre for the Study of Social History (CSSH) at the University of Warwick where he earned a Ph.D. in history in 1975. He worked on his doctoral thesis titled "The Dangerous Classes in Late Victorian England: Reflections on the Social Foundations of Disturbance and Order" under the supervision of the founder of CSSH E. P. Thompson.

Bailey had held various positions at several institutions (Note: a Lecturer in Economic and Social History at the University of Hull; an R.T. French visiting professor of History at the University of Rochester; a Research Officer at the Centre for Criminological Research, Oxford University from 1974 to 1978; a Research Fellow at Worcester College, Oxford University from 1978 to 1981.) before joining the University of Kansas (KU) in 1988. He worked at KU for thirty years, from 1988 to 2018.

Bailey was a visiting research professor at The Open University from 1999 to 2002, and a visiting research fellow at the Institute of Historical Research at the University of London from 1999 to 2000. He is a Fellow of the Royal Historical Society (FRHistS).

In 2025, Routledge published his book Judges and Convicts: The Principles and Patterns of Criminal Sentencing in Victorian England. Bailey studies the transformation of criminal sentencing structures in nineteenth-century England. He traces the evolution of sentencing practices from the dismantling of the "Bloody Code" in the 1830s, through the mid-century shift from convict transportation to domestic penal servitude, to the unprecedented mitigation of sentencing severity in the final decades of the Victorian era. Based on sentencing decisions from professional judges at the county Assizes, the Old Bailey (Central Criminal Court), and the Middlesex Sessions, Bailey reveals discrete stages in the development of sentencing policy and analyzes the struggle for supremacy in sentencing between politicians, civil servants, and judges. The study provides a survey of nineteenth-century sentencing trends and explains how the remarkable reduction in sentencing severity ultimately established what Bailey identifies as the modern sentencing tariff—a new equation between crime and punishment that emerged by the century's end.

== Bibliography ==
- Judges and Convicts: The Principles and Patterns of Criminal Sentencing in Victorian England (Routledge, 2025)
- Nineteenth Century Crime and Punishment (Note: Volume I: Crime and Criminals; Volume II: Justice, Mercy, Death; Volume III: Next Only to Death; Volume IV: Prisons and Prisoners) (Routledge, 2021)
- The Rise and Fall of the Rehabilitative Ideal, 1895-1970 (Routledge, 2019)
- Charles Booth's Policemen: Crime, Police and Community in Jack-the-Ripper's London (Breviary Publications, 2014)
- Order and Disorder in Modern Britain: Essays on Riot, Crime, Policing and Punishment (Breviary Publications, 2014)
- “This Rash Act”: Suicide Across the Life Cycle in the Victorian City (Stanford University Press, 1998) doi:10.1093/ehr/114.459.1349
- Forged in Fire: The History of the Fire Brigades Union, editor (Lawrence & Wishart, London, 1992)
- Delinquency and Citizenship: Reclaiming the Young Offender, 1914-1948 (Oxford University Press, 1987)
- Policing and Punishment in Nineteenth Century Britain, editor (Croom Helm, London, 1981), 2nd. edition, Routledge, 2016

=== Select articles ===
- “The Prison Population,” Howard Journal of Crime and Justice, Centenary Edition, 2021.
- “A Customary Scale of Punishment:” Judicial Sentencing in England and Wales,” in Elizabeth Gibson-Morgan (ed.), Fighting for Justice: Common Law and Civil Law Judges: Threats and Challenges (University of Wales Press, 2021).
- “The Shadow of the Gallows: The Death Penalty and the British Labour Government, 1945-51,” Law and History Review, vol. 18 (Summer 2000).
- “The Death Penalty in British History: Review Article,” Punishment & Society, vol. 2, # 1, January 2000.
- “English Prisons, Penal Culture, and the Abatement of Imprisonment, 1895-1922,” Journal of British Studies, July, 1997, pp. 285–324. (This article received the Walter D. Love Prize of the NACBS).
- “The Fabrication of Deviance. ‘Dangerous Classes’ and ‘Criminal Classes’ in Victorian England,” in R. Malcolmson & J. Rule (eds.), Protest and Survival: The Historical Experience. Essays for E.P. Thompson (The New Press, 1993), pp. 221-256.
- “Crime in the Twentieth Century,” History Today, May 1988, pp. 42–48.
- “Churchill as Home Secretary: Prison Reform,” History Today, March 1985, pp. 10–13.
- “‘In Darkest England and the Way Out’: the Salvation Army, Social Reform and the Labour Movement, 1885–1910,” International Review of Social History, XXIX, Part 2 (1984), pp. 133-71.
- “Bibles and Dummy Rifles: The Rise of the Boys’ Brigade,” History Today, Oct. 1983, pp. 5-9.
- “Scouting for Empire,” History Today, July 1982, pp. 5–9.
- “Reato, giustizia penale et autorita in Inghilterra, un decennio di studi storici, 1969-1979,” Quaderni Storici, no. 44, 1980.
- “Crime, Criminal Justice and Authority in England: Bibliographical Essay,” Bulletin of the Society for the Study of Labour History, No. 40, Spring 1980, pp. 36–46.
- “Reforming the Law of Incest,” Criminal Law Review, December 1979, pp. 749–64 (co-authored).
- “The Punishment of Incest Act 1908: A Case Study of Law Creation,” Criminal Law Review, November 1979, pp. 708–18, co-authored
- “Crime in England 1550-1860: Extended Review,” Sociological Review, Nov. 1978, pp. 925–31.
- “Salvation Army Riots, the ‘Skeleton Army’ and Legal Authority in the Provincial Town,” in Social Control in Nineteenth Century Britain, ed., A.P.Donajgrodzki (Croom Helm, 1977), pp. 231-53.

=== Select encyclopaedic and dictionary entries ===
- “Police” and “Juvenile Delinquency” in F.M. Leventhal (ed.), Encyclopedia of Twentieth Century Britain (Garland, 1995), pp. 418–19 and 630–31.
- “Suicide” in P.N. Stearns (ed.), Encyclopedia of Social History (Garland, 1993), pp. 734–35.
- “Francis Samuel (Frank) Smith (1854-1940): Social Reformer & Labour M.P.,” in J. Bellamy & John Saville (eds.), Dictionary of Labour Biography, vol. IX (Macmillan, 1993), pp. 270–74.
- “Alfred Russel Wallace (1823-1913),” in J.O. Baylen & N.J. Gossman (eds.), Biographical Dictionary of Modern British Radicals, vol. 3: 1870–1914, Part B (Simon & Schuster, 1988), pp. 829–33.
