= Jim Bulpitt =

British political scientist

- Born: James Graham Bulpitt; 1937; Wembley, London
- Died: 5 April 1999 (aged 61–62)
- Education: University of Exeter; Manchester; University of Milan
- Occupations: Political scientist professor of Politics at the University of Warwick

James Graham Bulpitt (1937 – 5 April 1999) was a professor of politics at the University of Warwick and a political scientist.

== Early life and education ==
Bulpitt was born in Wembley, London to a working-class family. He studied at the University of Exeter and Manchester and then went on to be a research fellow at the University of Milan. Bulpitt returned to the UK to be a lecturer at the University of Strathclyde.

== Career ==
He then went to lecture at Warwick in 1965 as a founding member of its Politics Department. He eventually came to be Chairman of the Politics Department. Bulpitt founded Modern British Studies at Warwick. At Warwick there is an annual prize of £100 awarded to a final year student for the best overall performance in the degrees of Politics or Politics with International Studies.

He is particularly famous for the early development of statecraft theory. He initially developed the approach as a useful way of understanding the Thatcher administration. This was later applied and redeveloped by Jim Buller to Europeanisation in his book National statecraft and European integration 1979-1997 and Toby S. James in Elite Statecraft and Election Administration. Eventually this led to the articulation of a neo-statecraft approach.

== Publications ==
- Jim Bulpitt, Party politics in English local government, (Longman, 1967).
- Jim Bulpitt, Territory and Power in the United Kingdom, (Manchester University Press, 1983).
- Jim Bulpitt, The discipline of the New Democracy: Mrs. Thatcher's Domestic Statecraft, Political Studies, 34:1, (1985), pp. 19–39.
- Jim Bulpitt, Rational politicians and conservative statecraft in the open polity, in Peter Byrd (ed.), British Foreign Policy under Thatcher (Oxford: Philip Allan, 1988), 214-256.
- Jim Bulpitt, Open Polity: External Affairs and British Domestic Politics in the 1980s, (Allan, 1989).
- Jim Bulpitt, Conservative leaders and the 'Euro-ratchet': five doses of scepticism, Political Quarterly, 63 (1992), pp. 258–275.
- Jim Bulpitt, The European question: rules, national modernisation and the ambiguities of primat der innenpolitik, in David Marquand and Anthony Seldon (eds.) The Ideas that shaped Post-War Britain, (London: Fontana, 1996), pp. 214–256.
- Jim Bulpitt, Historical Politics: Leaders, Statecraft and Regime in Britain at the Accession of Elizabeth II. In Contemporary Political Studies, vol. 2, edited by I. Hampster-Monk and J. Stayner, 1996, 1093-106. Oxford: Blackwell.
- Peter Burnham & Jim Bulpitt, Operation Robot and the British Political Economy in the Early 1950s: The Politics of Market Strategies, Contemporary British History, Vol. 13, No. 1, Spring, 1999, pp. 1–31.
