= David VandeLinde =

David VandeLinde was an American electrical engineering graduate from Carnegie Tech in 1964 and was the Vice-Chancellor of the University of Warwick from 2001 to 2006.

He went to Warwick in 2001 from the University of Bath, where he had been Vice-Chancellor for nine years. He was awarded an Honorary Degree (Doctor of Laws) by the University of Bath in 2001.

Academic offices
Preceded by John Rodney Quayle	Vice-Chancellor of the University of Bath; 1992-2001	Succeeded by Glynis Breakwell
Preceded by Brian Follett	Vice-Chancellor of the University of Warwick; 2001–2006	Succeeded by Nigel Thrift
