= Margaret Milan =

Scottish-French businesswoman

Margaret Milan is an accomplished Scottish-French businesswoman who founded the successful French educational toy mail order business Eveil & Jeux. A graduate of the University of Warwick and Harvard Business School and executive of Procter & Gamble in France, where she has worked for the entirety of her professional career. At P&G she worked in brand management for leading brands Ariel and Pampers.

She founded the Eveil & Jeux in 1989 from her house, employing mainly female staff, usually moms. The business grew substantially and in 1995 her husband Gilbert left his management consulting job to assist his wife. In December 1995, they raised venture capital funding of FF 5 million.

In 1998, the company reached €70 million in sales and two hundred permanent staff. In order to finance further growth, she sold 70% of the company to the French retail giant Pinault-Printemps-Redoute group. In 2001, she sold the remaining 30% of the company to the French retailer, with sales in excess of €100 million. She is now focused on running the Eveil & Jeux Foundation which funds educational projects in underprivileged communities and on encouraging French women to become involved in entrepreneurship through the Paris Professional Women's Network.
