= Stuart Neil =

Stuart Neil is professor of virology at King's College London. He is a Wellcome Trust Senior Research Fellow, and heads the Infectious Diseases department at King's College.

He is a graduate of the University of Warwick (BSc 1997) and holds a Ph.D. (2001). from University College London.

He is the recipient of numerous grants for research on SARS-CoV-2, HIV, and Ebola virus.
