= Brian Follett =

British zoologist

Brian Follett FRS DL
- Born: Brian Keith Follett; February 22, 1939 (age 87)
- Education: Bournemouth School; University of Bristol (BSc, PhD)
- Spouse: Deb Booth (m. 1961)
- Awards: Frink Medal (1993)
- Scientific career
- Fields: Physiology
- Workplaces: University of Oxford; University of Warwick; Washington State University; University of Leeds; Bangor University; University of Bristol
- Thesis: Neurohypophysial hormones of fish and amphibia (1963)
- Doctoral students: Russell Foster

Brian Keith Follett (born 22 February 1939) is a British biologist, academic administrator, and policy maker. His research focused upon how the environment, particularly how the annual change in day-length (photoperiod) controls breeding in birds and mammals and his teaching on physiological adaptations of vertebrates to the environment. He was appointed Knight Bachelor in 1992 and elected a Fellow of the Royal Society in 1984. Follett served as Professor and Head of Zoology at the University of Bristol from 1989 until 1992, then Vice-Chancellor of the University of Warwick until 2001. Subsequently, he chaired the UK government's Training and Development Agency for Schools and the Arts and Humanities Research Council (AHRC). Until 2019 he was a non-stipendiary visiting Professor in the Department of Zoology (now Biology) at the University of Oxford.

== Education and early life ==
Follett was educated at Bournemouth School and studied Biochemistry at the University of Bristol graduating in 1960. He was subsequently awarded a PhD for research supervised by Hans Heller in the Department of Pharmacology at the University of Bristol. This work introduced him to endocrinology and the development of assays to understand the physiological role of hormones.

== Career and research ==
In 1964 Follett moved to Washington State University and joined Donald Farner's group investigating photoperiodism. His research focused on the brain pathways whereby birds and mammals measure day length and use these changes to change gonadotrophin secretion from the pituitary gland and so regulate breeding. He was appointed a lecturer at University of Leeds then moved with James Dodd to the Bangor University in 1969, then to the University of Bristol as Professor of Zoology and Head of Department in 1978.

He was appointed Vice-Chancellor of University of Warwick in 1993.

=== Research programmes ===
Follett's studies used, as model species, the Japanese quail and later wild-caught starlings. His work included the development of the first radioimmunoassay to measure bird luteinizing hormone (LH) in collaboration with Frank Cunningham at the University of Reading and Colin Scanes. This made it possible to measure LH in a few microlitres of plasma and so follow circulating hormone levels in individual birds exposed to photoperiods of many types. This enabled the first detailed analyses of the annual pattern of hormone secretion as well as allowing deeper questions to be asked: for example, using gonadectomized quail to show unequivocally that the underlying photoperiodic response in birds (but not mammals) is driven by brain circuits that are switched on and off by day length and to demonstrate that measuring day length involved a daily (circadian) rhythm in photosensitivity with the birds being responsive to light particularly between 12 and 18 hours after dawn. In other words, if light fell at these hours then the day was read as "long", if not then it was read as "short".

In 1978 at Bristol, his research interests expanded to include mammals, notably sheep, and wild birds such as albatrosses, swans, gulls and partridges. Key studies included developing a rapid photoperiodic response system which enabled the detailed study of the neural pathways as they are switched on, the complex structure of the time-measuring system and the action spectrum for the non-retinal light receptors with Russell Foster. In Bristol the focus also swung towards the mechanisms involved in ending seasonal breeding - so-called refractoriness. The photoperiodic response involves both the induction of breeding and it ending each year. The Bristol group found, quite counterintuitively, that thyroid hormones are critical for refractoriness to develop and be maintained. This had been tentatively suggested in the Soviet Union prior to World War II but was developed by Trevor Nicholls, Arthur Goldsmith and Alistair Dawson. Importantly birds are hatched in a refractory state but this is ended by removing the thyroid glands (per Tony Williams). The research group's papers on this have proved of general value in understanding the seasonal control of the neuroendocrine pathways in not only birds but also in mammals.

Funding came from the Agricultural and Food Research Council (AFRC), later renamed the Biotechnology and Biological Sciences Research Council (BBSRC), and Follett's group became an official Research Council Research Group on Photoperiodism and Reproduction, with 413 scientific papers and reviews.

=== Academic administration ===
Follett served as head of the department of zoology (later biological sciences) at the University of Bristol for fifteen years (1978–1993), and Biological Secretary of the Royal Society from 1978 until 1993. He served as vice-chancellor of the University of Warwick for eight years.

Follett was appointed to the Council of the AFRC/BBSRC and then to the Universities Funding Council (UFC) and its subsequent body – Higher Education Funding Council for England (HEFCE). He served on the Council of London Zoo, Bristol Zoo and a trustee of the Natural History Museum, London. He was elected a Fellow of the Royal Society (FRS) in 1984 and appointed Knight Bachelor in 1992.

Follett has chaired committees for the UK government including reporting on the future of university libraries, research in the humanities, and the foot-and-mouth outbreak of 2001; and on the management and appraisal of clinical academics following the Alder Hey organs scandal.

Once retired, he took on the role of chair of the Arts and Humanities Research Council (2001–2009, and chaired the government's Teacher Training Agency (TTA) and its successor body the Training and Development Agency for Schools (TDA) from 2004 to 2010. Follett was a non-stipendiary visiting professor in the Department of Biology, University of Oxford (2001–2019) and taught physiology to undergraduates until 2015. He served as a governor of the Royal Shakespeare Theatre (2008–2018), and president of the Stratford Civic Society.

=== Awards and honours ===
- Elected a Fellow of the Royal Society (FRS) in 1984.
- Knighted in 1992
- Appointed Deputy Lieutenant (DL) for the West Midlands in 2000
- Doctor of Laws 2005
- Awarded 13 honorary doctorates and other awards.

== Personal life ==
Follett married Deb Booth in 1961, a teacher who later worked in public radio in the States and then became the production editor for the journals of the Society for Endocrinology. They have two children.

Academic offices
Preceded by Clark L. Brundin	Vice-Chancellor of the University of Warwick; 1993–2001	Succeeded by David VandeLinde
