= Zahra Newby =

Professor of Classics and Ancient History at the University of Warwick

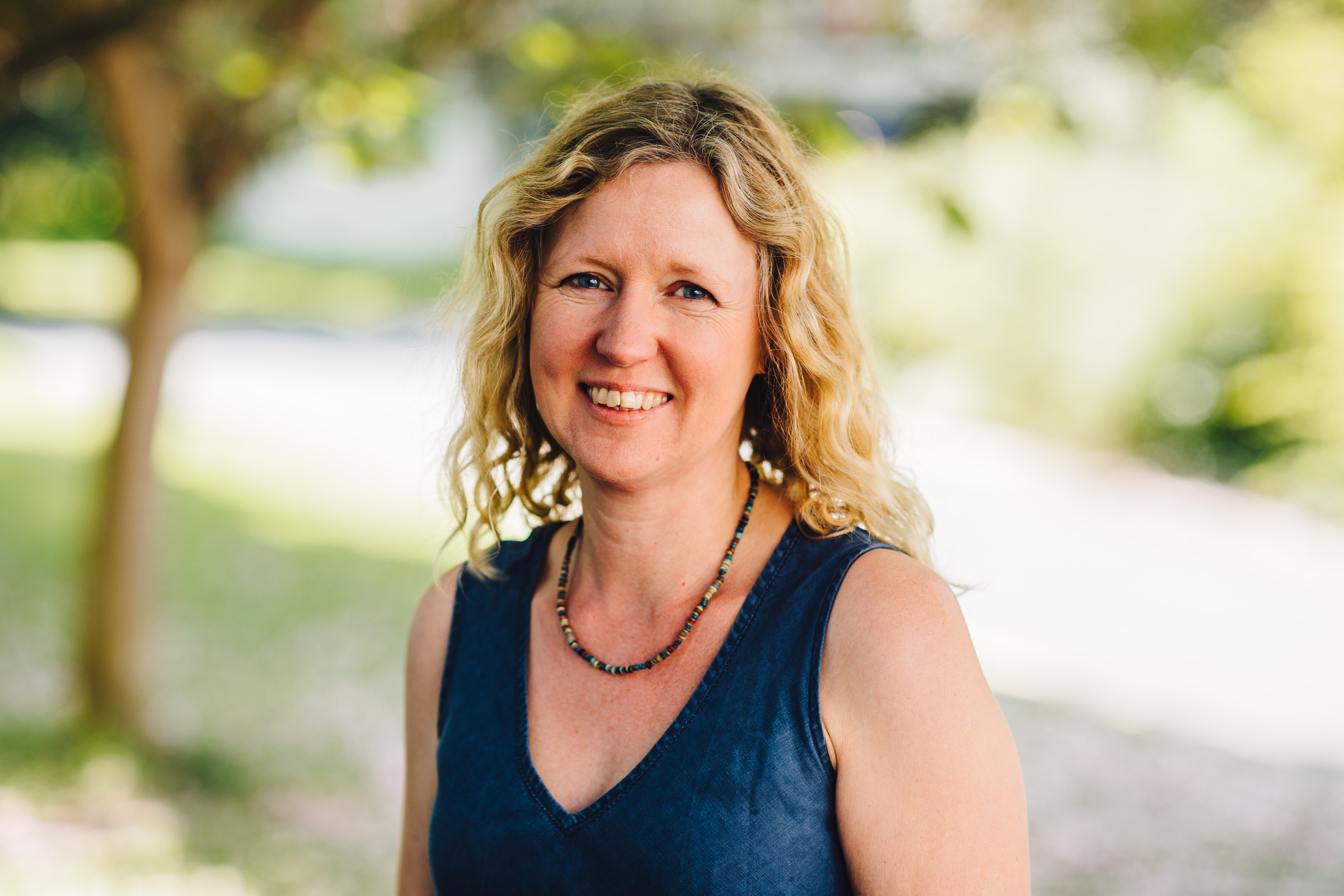

Academic background
- Education: University of Oxford, Courtauld Institute of Art
- Doctoral advisor: Jaś Elsner

Academic work
- Discipline: Classics
- Institutions: University of Warwick
- Notable works: Greek Myths in Roman Art and Culture: Imagery, values and identity in Italy, 50 BC - AD 150

Zahra Newby is Professor of Classics and Ancient History at the University of Warwick. She is known in particular for her work on Greek mythology in Roman art and the visual culture of Greek festivals in the Roman east. Newby is currently the Senior Tutor in the Classics and Ancient History Department at the University of Warwick.

== Career ==
Newby read classics at the University of Oxford and after gaining her BA moved to the Courtauld Institute of Art to study for an MA in Ancient Art. She remained there for her PhD, supervised by Jaś Elsner, with a dissertation on Art in the Second Sophistic.

Newby moved to the University of Warwick in 2000 as a lecturer in Classics and remained there becoming first senior lecturer and then Professor of Classics and Ancient History. She became Head of the Department of Classics and Ancient History in September 2018.

Newby works on the visual culture of the Roman Empire, with particular reference to the rise of Greek culture during the Second Sophistic. Newby's first book on Greek Athletics in the Roman World (2005) examined the representation of athletes in the Roman world and how athletics played a part in the representation of cities and individuals. She went on to work on links between art and text, particularly in inscriptions and in Greek literature in the Roman world, resulting in a number of articles and a co-edited volume on Art and Inscriptions in the Ancient World (2007). Newby's work on visual culture then extended into Greek mythology in Roman art, publishing her book Greek Myths in Roman Art and Culture (2016) with particular focus on the domestic and funerary contexts of mythological scenes. Newby is currently the Principal Investigator on the Leverhulme Trust funded project The Materiality of Graeco-Roman Festivals. The project examines the role that visual culture played in Greek civic festivals in the Roman Empire.

== Selected publications ==
- ed. with Ruth Toulson The Materiality of Mourning: Cross Disciplinary Perspectives (Routledge, 2018)
- Greek Myths in Roman Art and Culture: Imagery, values and identity in Italy, 50 BC - AD 150 (Cambridge University Press, 2016)
- ed. with Ruth Leader-Newby Art and Inscriptions in the Ancient World (Cambridge University Press, 2007)
- Athletics in the Ancient World (Duckworth, 2006)
- Greek Athletics in the Roman World. Victory and Virtue (Oxford University Press, 2005)
