= Victoria Rimell =

British classicist (born 1974)

Academic background
- Education: King's College, Cambridge; King's College, London

Academic work
- Discipline: Classics
- Sub-discipline: Latin Literature
- Institutions: Roma La Sapienza; Warwick University

Victoria Rimell (born 1974) is a British classicist and Professor of Latin at the University of Warwick. Among her publications are books on Ovid, Martial and Petronius.

== Career ==
Rimell studied Classics at King's College, Cambridge where she received a BA and an MPhil degree. She then moved to King's College, London, graduating with a PhD in 2001. After working at University College, Oxford, and Cambridge University, she took up a position at Sapienza University of Rome in 2004. Since 2016, she has worked at Warwick University as an Associate Professor and, from 2018, as a Professor. She also serves on the council of the Society for the Promotion of Roman Studies. In 2020, she was elected a member of the Academia Europaea.

== Selected publications ==
- Petronius and the Anatomy of Fiction, Cambridge University Press, 2002
- Ovid’s Lovers: Desire, Difference, and the Poetic Imagination, Cambridge University Press, 2006
- Martial’s Rome: Empire and the Ideology of Epigram, Cambridge University Press, 2008
- The Closure of Space in Roman Poetics: Empire’s Inward Turn, Cambridge University Press, 2015
