= John McEldowney (law professor) =

John McEldowney is professor of law at the University of Warwick and former World Bank visiting fellow in the Supreme Tribunal of Justice in Venezuela.

== Education ==
John McEldowney graduated from Queen's University Belfast in Northern Ireland.

== Appointments ==
John McEldowney is professor of law and co-editor of the Journal of Law, Science and Policy. McEldowney was elected a "New Zealand Law Foundation Distinguished Visiting Fellow" in 2001. He has held visiting appointments in Japanese and French universities. In 2000 he was the World Bank visiting fellow in the Supreme Tribunal of Justice in Venezuela. In 2004 he was awarded a 'Medal of Honour' from the Lille 2 University of Health and Law.
