= Klymenko =

Klymenko (Ukrainian: Клименко) is a Ukrainian surname that derived from the given name of Klym, which originated from the Latin Clement. Sometimes it is transliterated through Russian language as Klimenko and Belarusian as Klimenka. It may refer to the following notable people:

- Aleksandr Klimenko (athlete) (1970–2000), Ukrainian shot putter
- Aleksandr Petrovich Klimenko, Russian scientist, inventor of refrigeration technique Kleemenko cycle
- Alyaksandr Klimenka (born 1983), Belarusian footballer
- Alyona Klimenko (born 1982), Kazakhstani water polo player
- Andrei Klimenko (born 1978), Russian footballer
- Anton Klimenko (born 1985), Russian footballer
- Artem Klimenko (born 1994), Russian basketball player
- Betty Klimenko (born 1959), Australian businesswoman
- Ganna Klymenko (born 1992), Ukrainian synchronized swimmer
- Gleb Klimenko (born 1983), Russian ice hockey player
- Ihor Klymenko (born 1972), Ukrainian police chief and acting Minister of Internal Affairs
- Ivan Klymenko (born 1987), Ukrainian musician, producer, and songwriter
- Ksenia Klimenko (born 2003), Russian artistic gymnast
- Larisa Klimenko (born 1949), Soviet gymnast
- Max Klymenko (born 1995), British–Ukrainian TikToker and YouTuber
- Oleksandr Klymenko (disambiguation), multiple Ukrainian individuals
- Pavel Klimenko (1977–2024), Russian major general
- Svitlana Stanko-Klymenko (born 1976), Ukrainian long-distance runner
- Viktor Klimenko (disambiguation), multiple individuals
- Vladyslav Klymenko (born 1994), Ukrainian footballer
- Yelena Klimenko (born 1991), Kazakhstani handball player
- Yuriy Klymenko (born 1973), Ukrainian politician
