= Strategy =

Discipline for achieving objectives against unpredictability, complexity, and ambiguity

Strategy (from Greek στρατηγία stratēgia, "troop leadership; office of general, command, generalship") is a general plan to achieve one or more long-term or overall goals under conditions of uncertainty. In the sense of the "art of the general", which included several subsets of skills including military tactics, siegecraft, logistics etc., the term came into use in the 6th century C.E. in Eastern Roman terminology, and was translated into Western vernacular languages only in the 18th century. From then until the 20th century, the word "strategy" came to denote "a comprehensive way to try to pursue political ends, including the threat or actual use of force, in a dialectic of wills" in a military conflict, in which both adversaries interact.

Strategy is important because the resources available to achieve goals are usually limited. Strategy generally involves setting goals and priorities, determining the actions needed to achieve the goals, and mobilizing resources to execute those actions. A strategy describes how the ends (goals) will be achieved by the means (resources). Strategy can be intended or can emerge as a pattern of activity as the organization adapts to its environment or competes. It involves activities such as strategic planning and strategic thinking.

Henry Mintzberg from McGill University defined strategy as a pattern in a stream of decisions to contrast with a view of strategy as planning, while Max McKeown (2011) argues that "strategy is about shaping the future" and is the human attempt to get to "desirable ends with available means". Vladimir Kvint defines strategy as "a system of finding, formulating, and developing a doctrine that will ensure long-term success if followed faithfully."

== Military theory ==
Subordinating the political point of view to the military would be absurd, for it is policy that has created war...Policy is the guiding intelligence, and war only the instrument, not vice-versa.

— On War by Carl von Clausewitz

In military theory, strategy is "the utilization during both peace and war, of all of the nation's forces, through large scale, long-range planning and development, to ensure security and victory" (Random House Dictionary).

The father of Western modern strategic study, Carl von Clausewitz, defined military strategy as "the employment of battles to gain the end of war." B. H. Liddell Hart's definition put less emphasis on battles, defining strategy as "the art of distributing and applying military means to fulfill the ends of policy". Hence, both gave the pre-eminence to political aims over military goals. U.S. Naval War College instructor Andrew Wilson defined strategy as the "process by which political purpose is translated into military action." Lawrence Freedman defined strategy as the "art of creating power."

Eastern military philosophy dates back much further, with examples such as The Art of War by Sun Tzu dated around 500 B.C.

=== Counterterrorism Strategy ===
Because counterterrorism involves the synchronized efforts of numerous competing bureaucratic entities, national governments frequently create overarching counterterrorism strategies at the national level. A national counterterrorism strategy is a government's plan to use the instruments of national power to neutralize terrorists, their organizations, and their networks in order to render them incapable of using violence to instill fear and to coerce the government or its citizens to react in accordance with the terrorists' goals. The United States has had several such strategies over the course of the war on terror, including the United States National Strategy for Counterterrorism (2018); the Obama-era National Strategy for Counterterrorism (2011); and the National Strategy for Combatting Terrorism (2003). There have also been a number of ancillary or supporting plans, such as the 2014 Strategy to Counter the Islamic State of Iraq and the Levant, and the 2016 Strategic Implementation Plan for Empowering Local Partners to Prevent Violent Extremism in the United States. Similarly, the United Kingdom's counterterrorism strategy, CONTEST, seeks "to reduce the risk to the UK and its citizens and interests overseas from terrorism so that people can go about their lives freely and with confidence."

== Management theory ==
The essence of formulating competitive strategy is relating a company to its environment.

— Michael Porter

Modern business strategy emerged as a field of study and practice in the 1960s; prior to that time, the words “strategy” and “competition” rarely appeared in the most prominent management literature. Alfred Chandler wrote in 1962 that: "Strategy is the determination of the basic long-term goals of an enterprise, and the adoption of courses of action and the allocation of resources necessary for carrying out these goals." Michael Porter defined strategy in 1980 as the "...broad formula for how a business is going to compete, what its goals should be, and what policies will be needed to carry out those goals" and the "...combination of the ends (goals) for which the firm is striving and the means (policies) by which it is seeking to get there."

=== Definition ===
Henry Mintzberg described five complementary definitions of strategy in 1998:

- Strategy as plan – a directed course of action to achieve an intended set of goals; similar to the strategic planning concept;
- Strategy as pattern – a consistent pattern of past behavior, with a strategy realized over time rather than planned or intended. Where the realized pattern was different from the intent, he referred to the strategy as emergent;
- Strategy as position – locating brands, products, or companies within the market, based on the conceptual framework of consumers or other stakeholders; a strategy determined primarily by factors outside the firm;
- Strategy as ploy – a specific maneuver intended to outwit a competitor; and
- Strategy as perspective – executing strategy based on a "theory of the business" or natural extension of the mindset or ideological perspective of the organization.

Complexity theorists define strategy as the unfolding of the internal and external aspects of the organization that results in actions in a socio-economic context.

=== Strategic Problem ===
In 1998, Crouch defined the strategic problem as maintaining flexible relationships that can range from intense competition to harmonious cooperation among different players in a dynamic market. While Crouch was open to the idea of cooperation between players, his approach still emphasized that strategy is shaped by market conditions and organizational structure. This view aligns with the definitions of strategy proposed by Porter and Mintzberg.

In contrast, Burnett regards strategy as a plan formulated through methodology in which the strategic problem encompasses six tasks: goal formulation, environmental analysis, strategy formulation, strategy evaluation, strategy implementation, and strategy control.

The literature identifies two main sources for defining a strategic problem. The first is related to environmental factors, and the second focuses on the organizational context (Mukherji and Hurtado, 2001). These two sources summarize three dimensions originally proposed by Ansoff and Hayes (1981). According to them, a strategic problem arises from analysis of internal and external issues, the processes to solve them, and the variables involved.

In Terra and Passador's view, organizations and the systems around them are tightly connected, so they rely on each other to survive. This means a strategy should balance being proactive and reactive. This involves recognizing the organization's impact on the environment and acting to minimize harm while adapting to new demands. The strategy should also align internal and external aspects of the organization and include all related entities. This helps build a complex socio-economic system where the organization is part of a sustainable ecosystem.

=== Complexity theory ===
Complexity science, as articulated by R. D. Stacey, represents a conceptual framework capable of harmonizing emergent and deliberate strategies. Within complexity approaches the term "strategy" is intricately linked to action. Complexity theorists view programs merely as predetermined sequences effective in highly ordered and less chaotic environments. Conversely, strategy emerges from a simultaneous examination of determined conditions (order) and uncertainties (disorder) that drive action. Complexity theory posits that strategy involves execution, encompasses control and emergence, scrutinizes both internal and external organizational aspects, and can take the form of maneuvers or any other act or process.

The works of Stacey stand as pioneering efforts in applying complexity principles to the field of strategy. This author applied self-organization and chaos principles to describe strategy, organizational change dynamics, and learning. Their propositions advocate for strategy approached through choices and the evolutionary process of competitive selection. In this context, corrections of anomalies occur through actions involving negative feedback, while innovation and continuous change stem from actions guided by positive feedback.

Dynamically, complexity in strategic management can be elucidated through the model of "Symbiotic Dynamics" by Terra and Passador. This model conceives the social organization of production as an interplay between two distinct systems existing in a symbiotic relationship while interconnected with the external environment. The organization's social network acts as a self-referential entity controlling the organization's life, while its technical structure resembles a purposeful "machine" supplying the social system by processing resources. These intertwined structures exchange disturbances and residues while interacting with the external world through their openness. Essentially, as the organization produces itself, it also hetero-produces, surviving through energy and resource flows across its subsystems.

This dynamic has strategic implications, governing organizational dynamics through a set of attraction basins establishing operational and regenerative capabilities. Hence, one of the primary roles of strategists is to identify "human attractors" and assess their impacts on organizational dynamics. According to the theory of Symbiotic Dynamics, both leaders and the technical system can act as attractors, directly influencing organizational dynamics and responses to external disruptions. Terra and Passador further assert that while producing, organizations contribute to environmental entropy, potentially leading to abrupt ruptures and collapses within their subsystems, even within the organizations themselves. Given this issue, the authors conclude that organizations intervening to maintain the environment's stability within suitable parameters for survival tend to exhibit greater longevity.

The theory of Symbiotic Dynamics posits that organizations must acknowledge their impact on the external environment (markets, society, and the environment) and act systematically to reduce their degradation while adapting to the demands arising from these interactions. To achieve this, organizations need to incorporate all interconnected systems into their decision-making processes, enabling the envisioning of complex socio-economic systems where they integrate in a stable and sustainable manner. This blend of proactivity and reactivity is fundamental to ensuring the survival of the organization itself.

=== Components ===
Professor Richard P. Rumelt described strategy as a type of problem solving in 2011. He wrote that good strategy has an underlying structure he called a kernel. The kernel has three parts: 1) A diagnosis that defines or explains the nature of the challenge; 2) A guiding policy for dealing with the challenge; and 3) Coherent actions designed to carry out the guiding policy. President Kennedy illustrated these three elements of strategy in his Cuban Missile Crisis Address to the Nation of 22 October 1962:

1. Diagnosis: "This Government, as promised, has maintained the closest surveillance of the Soviet military buildup on the island of Cuba. Within the past week, unmistakable evidence has established the fact that a series of offensive missile sites are now in preparation on that imprisoned island. The purpose of these bases can be none other than to provide a nuclear strike capability against the Western Hemisphere."
2. Guiding Policy: "Our unswerving objective, therefore, must be to prevent the use of these missiles against this or any other country, and to secure their withdrawal or elimination from the Western Hemisphere."
3. Action Plans: First among seven numbered steps was the following: "To halt this offensive buildup a strict quarantine on all offensive military equipment under shipment to Cuba is being initiated. All ships of any kind bound for Cuba from whatever nation or port will, if found to contain cargoes of offensive weapons, be turned back."

Rumelt wrote in 2011 that three important aspects of strategy include "premeditation, the anticipation of others' behavior, and the purposeful design of coordinated actions." He described strategy as solving a design problem, with trade-offs among various elements that must be arranged, adjusted and coordinated, rather than a plan or choice.

=== Formulation and implementation ===
Strategy typically involves two major processes: formulation and implementation. Formulation involves analyzing the environment or situation, making a diagnosis, and developing guiding policies. It includes such activities as strategic planning and strategic thinking. Implementation refers to the action plans taken to achieve the goals established by the guiding policy.

Bruce Henderson wrote in 1981 that: "Strategy depends upon the ability to foresee future consequences of present initiatives." He wrote that the basic requirements for strategy development include, among other factors: 1) extensive knowledge about the environment, market and competitors; 2) ability to examine this knowledge as an interactive dynamic system; and 3) the imagination and logic to choose between specific alternatives. Henderson wrote that strategy was valuable because of: "finite resources, uncertainty about an adversary's capability and intentions; the irreversible commitment of resources; necessity of coordinating action over time and distance; uncertainty about control of the initiative; and the nature of adversaries' mutual perceptions of each other."

== Game theory ==
In game theory, the mathematical study of strategic interactions, a player's strategy is any of the options that the player would choose in a specific setting. Any optimal outcomes they receive depend not only on their actions but also, the actions of other players.

== See also ==
- Consultant
- Odds algorithm (Odds strategy)
- Sports strategy
- Strategy game
- Strategic management
- Strategy map
- Strategy pattern
- Strategic planning
- Strategic voting
- Strategist
- Strategy Markup Language
- Tactic (method)
- Time management
- U.S. Army Strategist
