= Field of bullets =

Hypothetical model of extinction

The field of bullets hypothesis describes a model in which extinction is non-selective and occurs randomly. The metaphor of the field of bullets suggest that species are simply out in a field and "bullets" are hitting them at random, thus their extinction is due only to stochastic effects. The field of bullets operates without relation to the organisms' adaptability, or fitness of specific animals. Under this hypothesis all species are subjugated to the same probability of extinction no matter where they originate in their taxonomy, and irrespective of traits that typically buffer against extinction.
