= Adaptability =

Characteristics of a body to cope with another external body or factor

Adaptability (Latin: adaptō "fit to, adjust") is a feature of a system or a process describing the capacity to adjust in response to new conditions. adaptability in the field of organizational management can be generally seen as the ability to change something or oneself under conditions of the environment. In ecology, adaptability has been described as an organism's ability to adjust and thrive under the conditions of its own environment, see adaptive behaviour (ecology).

In business and manufacturing, adaptability is increasingly seen as an important factor towards efficiency and economic success. In contrast, in biological and ecological systems, adaptability and efficiency tend to be opposites of each other; thus, requiring a trade-off, since both are critical factors in system success.

Adaptability can be measured through characteristics, including responsiveness, flexibility, and stability. Responsiveness refers to how quickly a system can detect and react to a change in the environment, like changes in demand or changes in the amount of resources available. Flexibility refers to the ability of a system or a process to adapt to a change without fully disrupting the system or process. Stability refers to the ability for a system or process to maintain certain functions after a change in the environment.

== Terminology ==
In the life sciences the term adaptability is used variously. At one end of the spectrum, the ordinary meaning of the word suffices for understanding. At the other end, there is the term as introduced by Conrad, referring to a particular information entropy measure of the biota of an ecosystem, or of any subsystem of the biota, such as a population of a single species, a single individual, cell, protein or gene.

In the technical research field this feature has been considered only since the late 1990s. H. P. Wiendahl first introduced adaptability as a necessary feature of a manufacturing system in 1999. The need to consider adaptability arose in the context of factory planning, where it is an objective to develop modular, adaptable systems. It has now become an important consideration for manufacturing and system engineers.

== Adaptability of a system ==
=== Technological System ===
Adaptability is to be understood here as the ability of a system (e.g. a computer system) to adapt itself efficiently and fast to changed circumstances. An adaptive system is therefore an open system that is able to fit its behaviour according to changes in its environment or in parts of the system itself. That is why a requirement to recognise the demand for change without any other factors involved can be expressed.

=== Biological system (Mammals) ===
In a biological context, adaptability refers to the capacity of an organism to adapt or change to an environment. Adaptability can be measured behaviorally and physiologically, or evolutionary, illustrating changes to thriving in an environment. Physiologically, animals can adjust to their immediate environment by changing their metabolism and temperature with an increase in altitude. Animals can also display adaptability through evolution with gene frequencies that result in particular advantages in their environment. Polar bears have thick fur and a layer of fat to survive in colder environments and camels conserve water and adapt to extreme heat conditions. Animals like the peppered moth have adapted to their environment by changing color from light to dark. Mammals have evolutionary adapted to their environment through lactation. Charles Darwin's theory of natural selection explains that animals that are better adapted to their environment are more likely to reproduce and survive. These traits can be passed on genetically and the evolutionary changes can appear in populations over time.

Mammals, specifically humans, can adapt to immediate situations physiologically through adjustments in heart-rate, breathing, or metabolic activities. For instance, humans can tolerate heat by sweating and modulating their metabolism. In addition, lower oxygen levels are prevalent at higher altitudes, so the human body increases production of red blood cells, which leads to an increase of blood viscosity and oxygen delivery to tissues. Adaptability is specifically seen in humans as the human brain adapts to situations using neuroplasticity, especially after injury. The process of neuroplasticity is critical for learning new skills and adapting to new environments, playing a key role in motor learning and recovery. For example, after a stroke, some areas of the brain can lose their function, but neuroplasticity allows the brain to adapt to this new environment and other areas can take over.

Neuroplasticity encompasses both synaptic and structural plasticity. Adaptation in the brain is done through synaptic plasticity where the connections between neurons can be changed depending on activity. This done through modulating long-term potentiation, which is critical in learning and memory and increasing synaptic strength, and long-term depression, which decreases synaptic strength. Neurotransmitter release at activated synapses strengthens when a skill is frequently practiced to strengthen the neural circuit involved. For instance, playing an instrument or practicing a technique in sports constantly can strengthen the connections in the synapses involved in that specific task. Over time, neural efficiency increases and the individual can perform the task better. This exemplifies motor learning and adaptation. Also, everyday activities, like switching between tasks, involves synaptic plasticity to adapt thinking. In mammals, like rodents, synaptic plasticity plays an important role in navigating mazes and adapting to new environments. The rat is able to remember the route through trial and error due to synaptic plasticity. Long-term potentiation in the hippocampal regions, involved in spatial memory, on rats could enhance or improve memory, leading to better recall. Better recall improves adaptability to their new environment.

Additionally, the brain forms new neuronal connections and pathways to improve learning during environmental changes or injury through structural plasticity. This reflects processing and how neural codes encode information, enabling humans to learn new skills. Structural plasticity is seen when forming new synapses, synaptogenesis, or remodeling dendrites. For example, after a stroke, or a brain injury, new synapses can form and dendrites and branch off to restore language and motor abilities. This plays a large role in motor learning and adaptation as these mechanisms help to restore neural function and emphasize adaptability in the human body.

Adaptability in mammals, specifically regarding neuroplasticity, is prevalent in every-day life as it plays a key role in memory. Adaptation to an environment through neuroplasticity improves cognitive thinking, language, and decision making. For instance, taxi drivers who use their memory to navigate their environment, have shown differences in their hippocampus due to structural plasticity - enhancing certain abilities that improve their navigation. Other mammals use neuroplasticity in navigation as well. Primates use cognitive mapping to remember locations including that of food, danger, and their homes.

== See also ==
- Adaptive behaviour
- Ecological resilience
- Max Mckeown, author of Adaptability: The Art of Winning in an Age of Uncertainty
