= Oleksandr Klymenko =

Oleksandr Klymenko (Ukrainian: Олександр Клименко, variations Russian: Александр Клименко and Belarusian: Аляксандр Кліменка) is a popular name for people with a family name of Klymenko. It can also be spelled through the Russian transcription as Aleksandr Klimenko and may refer to following people:

- Aleksandr Klimenko (shot putter) (1970–2000), Ukrainian shot putter
- Oleksandr Klymenko (cyclist), Ukrainian cyclist
- Oleksandr Klymenko (detective), head of Ukrainian Specialized Anti-Corruption Prosecutor's Office since 28 July 2022
- Oleksandr Klymenko (footballer) (born 1982), Ukrainian footballer
- Oleksandr Klymenko (politician), Ukrainian politician
- Oleksandr Klymenko (2014 Ukrainian presidential candidate), Ukrainian politician
