= Aarti Holla-Maini =

Director of the UN Office for Outer Space Affairs since 2023

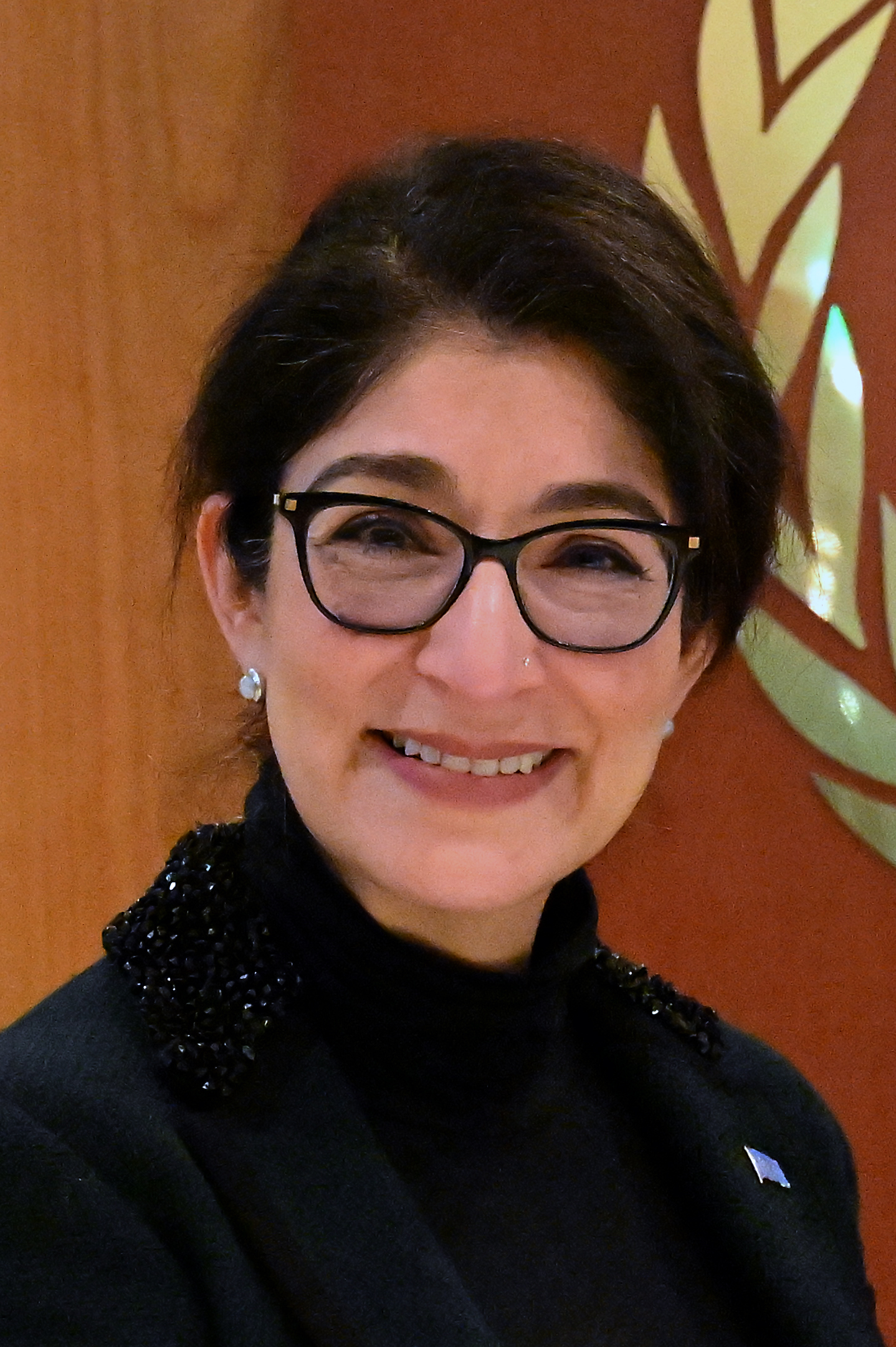
- Holla-Maini in 2024

Director of the United Nations Office for Outer Space Affairs (UNOOSA)
- Incumbent
- Assumed office 2023
- Secretary-General: António Guterres
- Preceded by: Simonetta Di Pippo

Personal details
- Education: King's College London (LLB); HEC Paris (MBA)
- Occupation: Lawyer, UN official

Aarti Holla-Maini is a British lawyer with a specialty in space policy. Since 2023, she has been Director of the United Nations Office for Outer Space Affairs (UNOOSA).

== Life and education ==
Aarti Holla-Maini received an LLB degree (with upper second class honours) from King's College London in 1992, which included time abroad studying German law at the University of Passau. She completed her Legal Practice Course at the University of Law, and in 1995 qualified as a solicitor of the Supreme Court of the United Kingdom. Holla-Maini also received an MBA from HEC Paris in 1997; during her program, she participated in an exchange program at the New York University Stern School of Business. She is also an alumnus of a course by the International Space University.

Holla-Maini is of British Indian origin and holds British and Belgian nationalities. She speaks English, French, German, and Punjabi fluently, and resides in Brussels.

== Career ==
Holla-Maini worked as a business development manager at Airbus Defense and Space from 1997 to 2000 in Munich and then from Brussels. In 2004, she became the secretary-general of the EMEA Satellite Operators Association (ESOA). Under her leadership, the ESOA expanded to a more global scope, becoming the Global Satellite Operators Association (GSOA) in 2021. From 2013 to 2014, Holla-Maini served as the vice-chair of the World Economic Forum Global Agenda Council for Space. She later served on the Global Future Council on Space Technologies. At the 2022 World Economic Forum Annual Meeting, Holla-Maini advocated for heightened cybersecurity around space-based services. Later that year, she was replaced by Isabelle Mauro as GSOA secretary-general. Between her time at GSOA and the UN, Holla-Maini was a vice president at NorthStar Earth & Space.

On 26 June 2023, António Guterres, Secretary-General of the United Nations, announced that Holla-Maini would serve as the director of UNOOSA, which is an office within the United Nations Secretariat. She took up the directorship in September of that year, succeeding Simonetta Di Pippo and an acting director. In her role, Holla-Maini serves as a senior advisor to the secretary-general and represents the officeholder at forums on the use of outer space. Holla-Maini highlighted the problem of space debris. It is estimated that there is 9,000 tonnes of debris in orbits at speeds of around 15,000 mph. The amount is increasing and there is an increased chance of collisions creating more bits. Holla-Maini predicted that it would take some time to agree international rules, but the UN had issued guidelines in 2019 and these could be the basis of national policies until then. She also took leadership of an idea called UNOOSA Space Bridge, which was launched at the start of 2024. The idea was to increase communication between areas of global interest using exchange programmes and other techniques to break down information silos.

At the 2024 Conference of the Parties, Holla-Maini participated in global discussions on the role of space in climate action. On the sidelines of the conference, she was interviewed by content creator Max Klymenko. In her roles, Holla-Maini has also been a participant in other forums on outer space and sustainability, such as the International Telecommunication Union's 2022 Forum on Science, Technology and Innovation for the Sustainable Development Goals, the International Research Center of Big Data for Sustainable Development Goals' 5th International Forum on Big Data for Sustainable Development Goals in 2025, and various events of the International Astronautical Federation.
