= Applied Economics Letters =

- Discipline: Applied economics
- Language: English
- Edited by: Mark P. Taylor

Publication details
- History: 1994–present
- Publisher: Routledge
- Frequency: 21/year
- Impact factor: 0.504 (2017)

Standard abbreviations
- ISO 4: Appl. Econ. Lett.

Indexing
- ISSN: 1350-4851 (print); 1466-4291 (web)
- LCCN: 2006233133
- OCLC no.: 813665884

Links
- Journal homepage; Online access

Applied Economics Letters is a peer-reviewed academic journal covering applied economics. It was established in 1994 and is published 21 times per year by Routledge. It is a companion journal to Applied Economics. The editor-in-chief is Mark P. Taylor (Warwick Business School). According to the Journal Citation Reports, the journal has a 2017 impact factor of 0.504.
