= Cobee =

Cobee is both a given name and a surname. Notable people with the name include:

- Cobee Bryant (born 2001), American football player
- Vincent Cobée (born 1968/1969), French businessman
