= Linda Jackson =

Linda Jackson may refer to:

- Linda Jackson (cyclist) (born 1958), Canadian professional cyclist
- Linda Jackson (designer) (born 1950), Australian fashion designer, fashion retailer and artist
- Linda Jackson (politician), former mayor of Vaughan, Ontario (2006–2010)
- Linda Jackson (businesswoman), CEO of French car manufacturer Citroën
