= Nandasiri =

Nandasiri may refer to:

- Nandasiri Jasentuliyana, Sri Lankan lawyer
- Sanath Nandasiri (born 1942), Sri Lankan classical musician
- Vijaya Nandasiri (1944 or 1947 – 2016), Sri Lankan dramatist and actor
