= Applied Economics (journal) =

- Discipline: Applied economics
- Language: English
- Edited by: Mark P. Taylor

Publication details
- History: 1969–present
- Publisher: Routledge
- Frequency: 60/year
- Impact factor: 0.968 (2018)

Standard abbreviations
- ISO 4: Appl. Econ.

Indexing
- ISSN: 0003-6846 (print); 1466-4283 (web)

Links
- Journal homepage; Online access

Applied Economics is a peer-reviewed academic journal published by Routledge with focus on the application of economic analyses. It is currently published by Routledge and circulates 60 issues per year. It was established in 1969 by the founding Editor Maurice H. Peston.

The current editor-in-chief is Mark P. Taylor.

Its companion journal is Applied Economics Letters. It incorporated Applied Financial Economics from 2015.
