= Simonetta Di Pippo =

Italian physicist

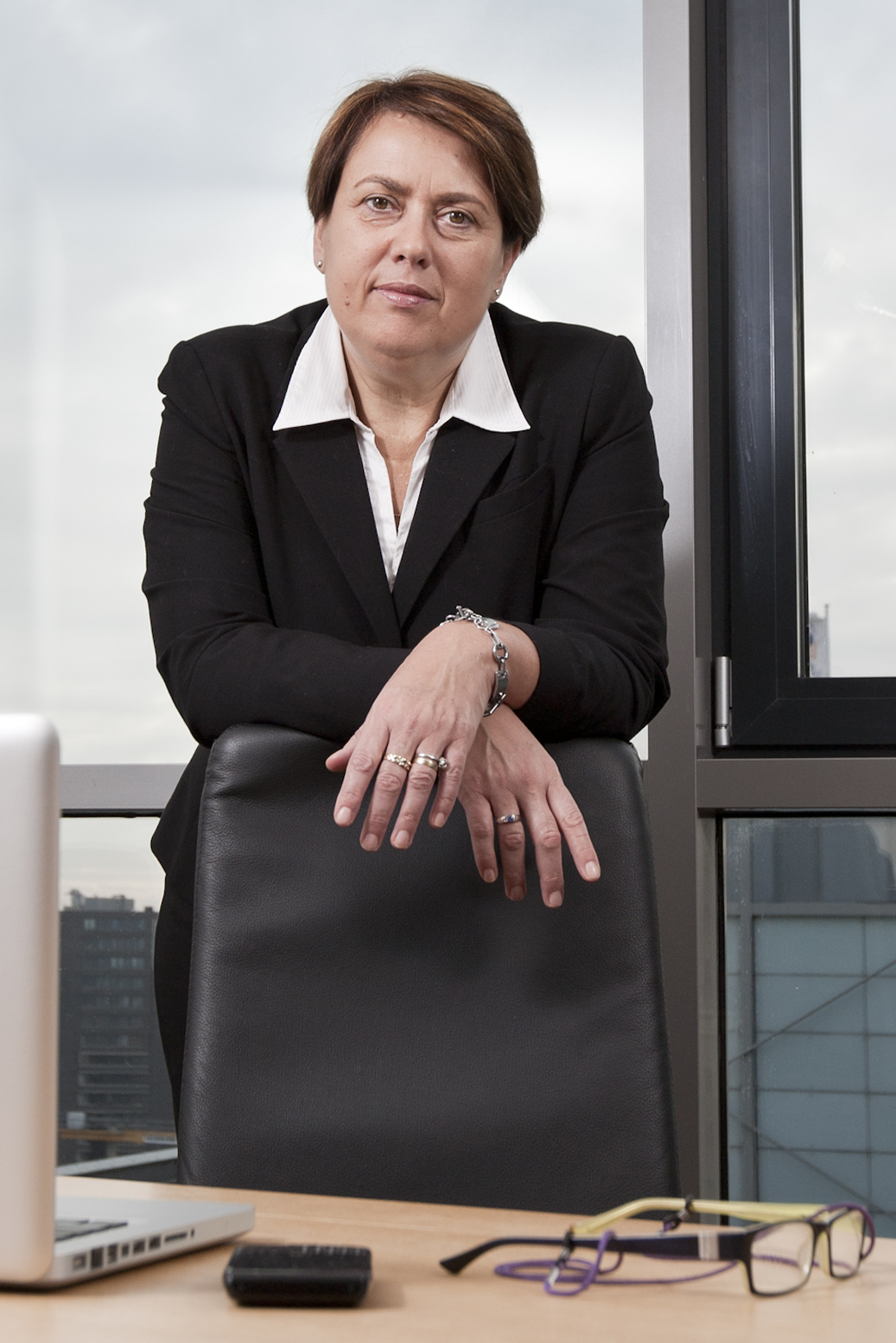
- Simonetta Di Pippo

Director of the United Nations Office for Outer Space Affairs (UNOOSA)
- In office 2014–2022
- Secretary-General: Ban Ki-moon; António Guterres
- Preceded by: Mazlan Othman
- Succeeded by: Aarti Holla-Maini

Personal details
- Education: Sapienza University of Rome
- Occupation: Astrophysicist, UN official

Simonetta Di Pippo is an Italian astrophysicist and former Director of the United Nations Office for Outer Space Affairs (UNOOSA). She holds a master's degree in Astrophysics and Space Physics from University "La Sapienza", and an Honoris Causa Degree in Environmental Studies, and an Honoris Causa Degree of Doctor in International Affairs. In 2008, the International Astronomical Union (IAU) named asteroid 21887 "dipippo" in honour of her contribution to space activities and in 2006, she was knighted by the President of the Italian Republic Carlo Azeglio Ciampi.

She is an Academician of IAA and a member of the World Economic Forum Global Future Council on space technology since 2016. In her career, Simonetta Di Pippo has been active in bridging the gender gap in STEM and the space sector. In 2009, she co-founded Women in Aerospace Europe and in 2017, she became a UN International Gender Champion.

Prior to joining UNOOSA, she served as Director of Human Spaceflight at ESA, Director of the Observation of the Universe at the Italian Space Agency and led the European Space Policy Observatory at ASI-Brussels.

== Early life and career ==
After graduating with a master's degree in Astrophysics and Space Physics from Sapienza University of Rome in 1984, Di Pippo joined the Italian Space Agency (ASI) in 1986. Her responsibilities ranged from Earth observation to automation and robotics, science and human spaceflight. In 2002 she took up duty as director of the ASI's Observation of the Universe. From 2008 to 2011, she served as director of Human Spaceflight at the European Space Agency (ESA), before returning to ASI to lead the European Space Policy Observatory at ASI-Brussels until March 2014.

Di Pippo co-founded, in June 2009, Women in Aerospace Europe (WIA-E) and has acted as its president since then. The association aims to expand the representation and leadership of women in the aerospace sector. In 2013 she received an Honoris Causa Degree in Environmental Studies from the St. John University in Vinovo (TO). Still in 2013, she was appointed Academician of the International Academy of Astronautics (IAA). Author of one book and co-author of another three, of more than 60 publications, more than 700 articles and interviews on magazines and newspapers, members and president of scientific committees of international congresses, member and president of scientific awards’ juries, she has been invited to teach at various universities, including the George Washington University in Washington D.C., and the LUISS-Business School in Rome. Di Pippo was knighted by the President of the Italian Republic in 2006 and, in 2008, the International Astronomical Union assigned the name "dipippo" to asteroid 21887, in recognition of her effort in space exploration.

== UN Office for Outer Space Affairs ==
Di Pippo was appointed Director of the UN Office for Outer Space Affairs (UNOOSA) in March 2014. As the Director of UNOOSA, she leads Office's strategies, policies and activities, ensuring that they are implemented in accordance with the mandates of the General Assembly, the Committee on the Peaceful Uses of Outer Space (COPUOS), and the established policies of the United Nations. She supervises the United Nations Programme on Space Applications and UN-SPIDER.

Di Pippo advises the Secretary-General of the United Nations and Director-General of UNOV and provides expertise on matters relating to the peaceful uses of outer space, and the use of space science and technology for sustainable development and disaster risk reduction. She also discharges the Secretary-General's obligations under international space law, including overseeing the United Nations Register of Objects Launched into Outer Space. She serves as Secretary of COPUOS and manages the arrangements and coordination of UN-Space.

Alongside her team in the Office of the Director, Di Pippo co-ordinates and oversees reports on budgetary and programme performance matters as well as public information and outreach activities to promote the benefits of outer space for humanity. She was thanked for her work when she was succeeded as Director by Aarti Holla-Maini on 26 June 2023.

== See also ==
- International Astronautical Federation – Global organization promoting international cooperation in space activities, of which Di Pippo is an Academician

== Other activities ==
- International Gender Champions (IGC), Member

== Recognition ==
In 2016 the American Institute of Aeronautics and Astronautics awarded Di Pippo its International Cooperation Award, which recognizes individuals who have contributed extensively to international cooperation in space activities.

Other awards include

- "Cavaliere Ufficiale al Merito" (Knighted by the President of the Italian Republic Carlo Azeglio Ciampi (2006);
- International Award "Sebetia-Ter" - Silver Award of the President of the Italian Republic "Professore Ingegnere Luigi Napolitano" Award for the contributions to the space sector (2010);
- The asteroid number 21887 named "Dipippo" by the International Astronomical Union as an acknowledgement to her commitment to space exploration (2006);
- G.B. Lacchini award, UAI (2012);
- International Cooperation Award, American Institute of Aeronautics and Astronautics (AIAA) (2016);
- Women in Aerospace Leadership award (2012).
- "Space Visionary" award, assigned by the International Society of Space Visionaries (2007);
- Award "Donna XIII" by the XIII Municipality of the City of Rome (2005);
- Special Award "Spazio alla salute" at the International Awards "Le Tecnovisionarie" 2010;
- International Award "San Valentino d’Oro" as an acknowledgment for her "commitment, focus and love for her job" (2011);
- International Award "Profilo Donna", XXII Edition (November 2011);
- The Hubert Curien Award (2018);
- Several ESA and NASA Team Achievement Awards;
- Order of the Rising Sun, 3rd Class, Gold Rays with Neck Ribbon (2022)

== Publications ==
- Astronauti, Mursia, 2002
- Dai ghiacci della Terra ai ghiacci dell'Universo, Di Martino, Di Pippo et al., Erga Edizioni, 2007
- European Operational Initiative on NEO Hazard Monitoring, S. Di Pippo, E. Perozzi, in Handbook of Cosmic Hazards and Planetary Defense, Springer, 2015
- YES WE_STEM, L. d’Ambrosio Marri, F. Marzano e E. Pietrafesa, Introduction by S. Di Pippo, e-book only.
