= Söhnke M. Bartram =

British academic

Söhnke Matthias Bartram is a professor in the Department of Finance at Warwick Business School (WBS). He is also a research fellow in the Financial Economics programme and the International Macroeconomics and Finance programme of the Centre for Economic Policy Research (CEPR), a charter member of Risk Who's Who, and a member of an international think tank for policy advice to the German government. Prior to joining the University of Warwick, he held faculty positions at Lancaster University and Maastricht University and worked for several years in quantitative investment management at State Street Global Advisors as Head of the London Advanced Research Center.

== Work ==
Bartram's immediate research activities center around issues in international finance, corporate finance and financial markets, especially financial risk management. His current research investigates, for example, the efficiency of U.S. and international equity markets using non-discretionary quantitative analysis of firm fundamentals, anomalies in international day and night returns, the relation between idiosyncratic risk and market risk, the interactions between defined-benefit pensions and corporate financial policy, and the effect of the use of financial derivatives on the risk and exposure of non-financial firms around the world. He is ranked number 251 in the world based on downloads on SSRN.

== Career ==
He completed his Bachelor of Science and Master of Science degrees in business administration and economics at the Saarland University/University of Michigan, and obtained a PhD degree with distinction from WHU – Otto Beisheim School of Management.

Bartram has been a visiting scholar at the Fisher College of Business/Ohio State University, the Kenan-Flagler Business School/University of North Carolina, the University of Texas at Austin, the Kiel Institute for the World Economy, the Financial Markets Group at the London School of Economics, the UCLA Anderson School of Management, and a visiting professor of finance at London Business School, the Stern School of Business at New York University, the Center for Financial Studies at Goethe University Frankfurt, the Bank of Finland, the European University Institute, and the Einaudi Institute for Economics and Finance. He has received scholarships by the German Academic Exchange Service, the Fulbright Commission, the German National Merit Foundation and the Federal Ministry of Economics and Technology (Germany). Bartram worked for several years in quantitative investment research for State Street Global Advisors as head of the London Advanced Research Center and is a consultant to various financial institutions and investment companies.

Bartram has been awarded a higher doctorate, the degree of Doctor of Science (DSc), by the University of Warwick.

== Honors and awards ==
- Humboldt Prize
- Christensen Fellow, St Catherine's College, Oxford
- Citations of Excellence Award by Emerald
- Higher Doctorate, Doctor of Science (DSc) by University of Warwick
- 2nd Biannual Pearson/Prentice Hall Best Paper Award by Financial Management
- 3rd Biannual Best Paper Award by Journal of Empirical Finance
- Josseph de la Vega Prize by Federation of European Securities Exchanges
- Asia Asset Management – The Centre for Asset Management Research & Investments (CAMRI) – CFA Institute Prize in Asset Management

== Bibliography ==
1. Bartram, Söhnke M.; Grinblatt, Mark; Xu, Yan (January 2025). Monetary Policy Predicts Currency Movements (Report). NBER Working Paper 33423. SSRN 5096662.
2. Bartram, Söhnke M.; Chhaochharia, Vidhi; Kumar, Alok; Mo, Hongwei (October 2024). Learning from Local Analysts (Report). CEPR Working Paper 55534. SSRN 4986874.
3. Bartram, Söhnke M.; Brown, Gregory W.; Stulz, Rene M. (June 2024). Creative Destruction, Stock Return Volatility, and the Number of Listed Firms (Report). Fisher College of Business Working Paper. SSRN 4854349.
4. Bartram, Söhnke M.; Grinblatt, Mark; Nozawa, Yoshio (December 2023). "Book-to-Market, Mispricing, and the Cross-Section of Corporate Bond Returns" (PDF). Journal of Financial and Quantitative Analysis: 1–49. doi:10.1017/S0022109024000048. SSRN 3510630.
5. Bartram, Söhnke M.; Djuranovik, Leslie; Garratt, Anthony; Xu, Yan (October 2023). "Mispricing and Risk Premia in Currency Markets" (PDF). Journal of Financial and Quantitative Analysis: 1–93. doi:10.1017/S0022109023001400. SSRN 4599758.
6. Bartram, Söhnke M.; Conrad, Jennifer; Lee, Jongsub; Subrahmanyam, Marti G. (May 2022). "Credit default swaps around the world" (PDF). Review of Financial Studies. 35 (5): 2464–2524. doi:10.1093/rfs/hhab092. SSRN 3783886.
7. Bartram, Söhnke M.; Hou, Kewei; Kim, Sehoon (February 2022). "Real Effects of Climate Policy: Financial Constraints and Spillovers" (PDF). Journal of Financial Economics. 143 (2): 668–696. doi:10.1016/j.jfineco.2021.06.015. SSRN 3816874.
8. Bartram, Söhnke M.; Branke, Jürgen; De Rossi, Giuliano; Motahari, Mehrshad (Summer 2021). "Machine Learning for Active Portfolio Management" (PDF). Journal of Financial Data Science. 3 (4): 9–30. doi:10.3905/jfds.2021.1.071. S2CID 236639528.
9. Bartram, Söhnke M.; Hou, Kewei; Kim, Sehoon (May 2021). "Tackling climate change requires global policies". In Weder di Mauro, Beatrice (ed.). Combating Climate Change: A CEPR Collection (PDF). CEPR Press. pp. 137–143. ISBN 978-1-912179-52-7.
10. Bartram, Söhnke M.; Lohre, Harald; Pope, Peter; Ranganathan, Lakshmi (April 2021). "Navigating the Factor Zoo Around the World: An Institutional Investor Perspective". Journal of Business Economics. 91 (5): 655–703. doi:10.1007/s11573-021-01035-y. PMC 8074275. PMID 38624719. S2CID 233408257. SSRN 3510989.
11. Bartram, Söhnke M.; Grinblatt, Mark (February 2021). "Global Market Inefficiencies" (PDF). Journal of Financial Economics. 139 (1): 234–259. doi:10.1016/j.jfineco.2020.07.011. SSRN 2540216.
12. Bartram, Söhnke M.; Branke, Jürgen; Motahari, Mehrshad (August 2020). Artificial Intelligence in Asset Management (Report). CFA Institute Research Foundation Literature Reviews. ISBN 978-1-952927-02-7. SSRN 3692805.
13. Bartram, Söhnke M.; Brown, Gregory W.; Stulz, Rene M. (January 2018). Why has Idiosyncratic Risk been Historically Low in Recent Years? (Report). Fisher College of Business Working Paper. Vol. 2018-03-02. SSRN 3107798.
14. Bartram, Söhnke M.; Brown, Gregory W.; Stulz, Rene M. (June 2016). Why does idiosyncratic risk increase with market risk? (Report). Fisher College of Business Working Paper. Vol. 2016-03-13. SSRN 2816138.
15. Bartram, Söhnke M.; Grinblatt, Mark (April 2018). "Agnostic Fundamental Analysis Works" (PDF). Journal of Financial Economics. 128 (1): 125–147. doi:10.1016/j.jfineco.2016.11.008. SSRN 2670839.
16. Bartram, Söhnke M. (October 2017). "In Good Times and in Bad: Defined Benefit Pensions and Corporate Financial Policy". Journal of Corporate Finance. SSRN 2145261.
17. Bartram, Söhnke M. (September 2017). "Corporate Hedging and Speculation with Derivatives". Journal of Corporate Finance. SSRN 891190.
18. Bartram, Söhnke M. (February 2017). "Corporate Post-Retirement Benefit Plans and Real Investment". Management Science. 63 (2): 355–383. doi:10.1287/mnsc.2015.2307. SSRN 2395843.
19. Bartram, Söhnke M. (March 2016). "Corporate Post-Retirement Benefit Plans and Leverage". Review of Finance. 20 (2): 575–629. doi:10.1093/rof/rfv021. hdl:10.1093/rof/rfv021. SSRN 1736803.
20. Bartram, Söhnke M.; Griffin, John; Ng, David; Lim, Tae-Hoon (August 2015). "How Important are Foreign Ownership Linkages for International Stock Returns?". Review of Financial Studies. 28 (11): 3036–3072. doi:10.1093/rfs/hhv030. SSRN 2540283.
21. Bartram, Söhnke M.; Brown, Gregory W.; Waller, William (August 2015). "How Important is Financial Risk?". Journal of Financial and Quantitative Analysis. 50 (4): 801–824. doi:10.1017/s0022109015000216. SSRN 2307939.
22. Bartram, Söhnke M.; Wang, Jeffrey (July 2015). "European Financial Market Dependence: An Industry Analysis". Journal of Banking and Finance. 59: 146–163. doi:10.1016/j.jbankfin.2015.06.002. SSRN 1570488.
23. Bartram, Söhnke M.; Burns, Natasha; Helwege, Jean (September 2013). "Foreign Currency Exposure and Hedging: Evidence from Foreign Acquisitions" (PDF). Quarterly Journal of Finance. 3 (2): 1350010. doi:10.1142/s2010139213500109. SSRN 1116409.
24. Bartram, Söhnke M.; Brown, Gregory W.; Stulz, Rene M. (August 2012). "Why Are U.S. Stocks More Volatile?" (PDF). Journal of Finance. 67 (4): 1329–1370. doi:10.1111/j.1540-6261.2012.01749.x. S2CID 18587238. SSRN 2257549.
25. Bartram, Söhnke M.; Bodnar, Gordon M. (June 2012). "Crossing the Lines: The Relation between Exchange Rate Exposure and Stock Returns in Emerging and Developed Markets" (PDF). Journal of International Money and Finance. 31 (4): 766–792. doi:10.1016/j.jimonfin.2012.01.011. SSRN 1983215.
26. Bartram, Söhnke M.; Brown, Gregory W.; Conrad, Jennifer C. (August 2011). "The Effects of Derivatives on Firm Risk and Value" (PDF). Journal of Financial and Quantitative Analysis. 46 (4): 967–999. doi:10.1017/s0022109011000275. S2CID 3945906. SSRN 1550942.
27. Aretz, Kevin; Bartram, Söhnke M.; Pope, Peter F. (April–June 2011). "Asymmetric Loss Functions and the Rationality of Expected Stock Returns" (PDF). International Journal of Forecasting. 27 (2): 413–437. doi:10.1016/j.ijforecast.2009.10.008. SSRN 889323.
28. Aretz, Kevin; Bartram, Söhnke M. (Winter 2010). "Corporate Hedging and Shareholder Value". Journal of Financial Research. 33 (4): 317–371. doi:10.1111/j.1475-6803.2010.01278.x. S2CID 20087872. SSRN 1354149.
29. Aretz, Kevin; Bartram, Söhnke M.; Pope, Peter F. (June 2010). "Macroeconomic Risks and Characteristic-Based Factor Models" (PDF). Journal of Banking and Finance. 34 (6): 1383–1399. doi:10.1016/j.jbankfin.2009.12.006. S2CID 153981367. SSRN 646522.
30. Bartram, Söhnke M.; Brown, Gregory W.; Minton, Bernadette (February 2010). "Resolving the Exposure Puzzle: The Many Facets of Exchange Rate Exposure" (PDF). Journal of Financial Economics. 95 (2): 148–173. doi:10.1016/j.jfineco.2009.09.002. SSRN 1429286.
31. Bartram, Söhnke M.; Bodnar, Gordon M. (December 2009). "No Place to Hide: The Global Crisis in Equity Markets in 2008/09" (PDF). Journal of International Money and Finance. 28 (8): 1246–1292. doi:10.1016/j.jimonfin.2009.08.005. S2CID 155030106. SSRN 1413914.
32. Bartram, Söhnke M.; Brown, Gregory W.; Fehle, Frank R. (Spring 2009). "International Evidence on Financial Derivatives Usage". Financial Management. 38 (1): 185–206. doi:10.1111/j.1755-053x.2009.01033.x. SSRN 471245.
33. Bartram, Söhnke M. (August 2008). "What Lies Beneath: Foreign Exchange Rate Exposure, Hedging and Cash Flows" (PDF). Journal of Banking and Finance. 32 (8): 1508–1521. doi:10.1016/j.jbankfin.2007.07.013. SSRN 905087.
34. Bartram, Söhnke M.; Fehle, Frank R.; Shrider, David (May 2008). "Does Adverse Selection Affect Bid-Ask Spreads for Options?". Journal of Futures Markets. 28 (5): 417–437. doi:10.1002/fut.20316. S2CID 154229351. SSRN 1089222.
35. Bartram, Söhnke M.; Brown, Gregory W.; Hund, John (December 2007). "Estimating Systemic Risk in the International Financial System" (PDF). Journal of Financial Economics. 86 (3): 835–869. doi:10.1016/j.jfineco.2006.10.001. SSRN 938707.
36. Bartram, Söhnke M. (December 2007). "Corporate Cash Flow and Stock Price Exposures to Foreign Exchange Rate Risk" (PDF). Journal of Corporate Finance. 13 (5): 981–994. doi:10.1016/j.jcorpfin.2007.05.002. SSRN 985413.
37. Bartram, Söhnke M.; Bodnar, Gordon M. (September 2007). "The Foreign Exchange Exposure Puzzle". Managerial Finance. 33 (9): 642–666. doi:10.1108/03074350710776226. S2CID 154570237. SSRN 891887.
38. Bartram, Söhnke M.; Taylor, Stephen J.; Wang, Yaw-Huei (May 2007). "The Euro and European Financial Market Dependence" (PDF). Journal of Banking and Finance. 51 (5): 1461–1481. doi:10.1016/j.jbankfin.2006.07.014. SSRN 924333.
39. Bartram, Söhnke M.; Fehle, Frank R. (March 2007). "Competition without Fungibility: Evidence from Alternative Market Structures for Derivatives". Journal of Banking and Finance. 31 (3): 659–677. doi:10.1016/j.jbankfin.2006.02.004. S2CID 55973719. SSRN 311880.
40. Bartram, Söhnke M.; Karolyi, G. Andrew (October 2006). "The Impact of the Introduction of the Euro on Foreign Exchange Rate Risk Exposures". Journal of Empirical Finance. 13 (4–5): 519–549. doi:10.1016/j.jempfin.2006.01.002. SSRN 299641.
41. Bartram, Söhnke M. (2006). "The Use of Options in Corporate Risk Management". Managerial Finance. 32 (2): 160–181. doi:10.1108/03074350610641929. S2CID 154610866. SSRN 991261.
42. Bartram, Söhnke M.; Dufey, Gunter; Frenkel, Michael (October–December 2005). "A Primer on the Exposure of Nonfinancial Corporations to Foreign Exchange Rate Risk". Journal of Multinational Financial Management. 15 (4/5): 394–413. doi:10.1016/j.mulfin.2005.04.001. S2CID 154989854. SSRN 938948.
43. Bartram, Söhnke M.; Wang, Yaw-Huei (2005). "Another Look at the Relationship between Cross-market Correlation and Volatility" (PDF). Finance Research Letters. 2 (2): 75–88. doi:10.1016/j.frl.2005.01.002. S2CID 16891423. SSRN 673622.
44. Bartram, Söhnke M. (June 2004). "Linear and Nonlinear Foreign Exchange Rate Exposures of German Nonfinancial Corporations". Journal of International Money and Finance. 23 (4): 673–699. doi:10.1016/j.jimonfin.2004.03.002. SSRN 327660.
45. Bartram, Söhnke M. (2002). "The Interest Rate Exposure of Nonfinancial Corporations". European Finance Review. 6 (1): 101–125. doi:10.1023/a:1015024825914. hdl:10.1023/A:1015024825914. SSRN 327660.
46. Bartram, Söhnke M. (2001). "International Portfolio Investment: Theory, Evidence, and Institutional Framework". Financial Markets, Institutions & Instruments. 10 (3): 85–155. doi:10.1111/1468-0416.00043. hdl:2027.42/35386. SSRN 270196.
47. Bartram, Söhnke M. (2000). "Corporate Risk Management as a Lever for Shareholder Value Creation". Financial Markets, Institutions & Instruments. 9 (5): 279–324. doi:10.1111/1468-0416.00038. SSRN 279507.
