= Mark P. Taylor =

- Education: University of Oxford; University of London
- Occupation: Professor

Mark P. Taylor is the Donald Danforth, Jr. Distinguished Professor of Finance at Olin Business School, Washington University in St. Louis. Previously, he was Dean of Olin Business School after holding the same role at Warwick Business School (WBS) at the University of Warwick. Before that, a managing director of BlackRock.

== Education ==
Taylor completed his undergraduate degree in philosophy, politics and economics (PPE) at the University of Oxford and holds MSc and PhD degrees in economics and finance from London University, as well as an MBA in Higher Education from the Institute of Education at University College, London and an MA in English literature from Liverpool University. In 2012, Taylor was awarded a higher doctorate, the degree of Doctor of Science (DSc), by the University of Warwick.

== Academic and business career ==
Taylor began his career as a foreign exchange trader in the City of London. From 2006 until 2010 he worked as a managing director at BlackRock. In 2010, Taylor left BlackRock to become dean of Warwick Business School. In December 2016, he became dean of Olin Business School. Taylor has also been a fellow of University College, University of Oxford, has held professorships at the University of Dundee, Cass Business School, London and at Liverpool University and has been a visiting professor at the Stern School of Business, New York University, the University of Bordeaux and at the University of Aix-Marseille. Taylor was a senior economist at the International Monetary Fund, Washington, D.C., for five years and an economist at the Bank of England.

== Research background ==
Taylor is a Nonresident Senior Fellow of the Brookings Institution, a Research Fellow of the Centre for Economic Policy Research, a Fellow of the Royal Statistical Society (FRSS), a Fellow of the Academy of Social Sciences (FAcSS) and a Fellow of the Royal Society of the Arts (FRSA).

== Editorial activities ==
Taylor is the editor-in-chief of both Applied Economics and its sister journal Applied Economics Letters. He is also the editor of the International Journal of Finance & Economics.
