= UN-SPIDER =

Space technology for disaster management

UN-SPIDER (United Nations Platform for Space-based Information for Disaster Management and Emergency Response) is a platform which facilitates the use of space-based technologies for disaster risk management and emergency response. It is a programme under the auspices of the United Nations Office for Outer Space Affairs (UNOOSA).

== Space technology for disaster risk management and emergency response ==
Global vulnerability to natural hazards and disasters is likely to increase as the impact of climate change and land degradation processes continue to rise along with rapidly growing populations. Earthquakes, floods, storms, and other natural hazards cause massive disruption to societies and overburden national economic systems. Considerable losses of life and property, however, could be avoided through better information about the risk and onset of disasters, improved risk assessment, end-to-end, people-centered Multi-hazard Early Warning Systems (MHEWS), Anticipatory Action (AA), and disaster monitoring. In recognition of these needs the United Nations General Assembly, in its resolution 61/110 of 14 December 2006, acknowledged that the use of existing space technology, such as earth observation and meteorological satellites, communication and navigation satellites can play a major role in supporting disaster management by providing accurate and timely information for decision making. Space-based information is relevant in all phases of the disaster management cycle from disaster risk reduction to disaster response and recovery.

In March 2015, world leaders convened in Sendai, Japan, to agree on a new global framework for disaster risk reduction for the period 2015 through 2030. The outcome document refers to the importance of space-based and geospatial information in several paragraphs, highlighting, among others, the importance to "develop, update periodically and disseminate, as appropriate, location-based disaster risk information, including risk maps, to decision-makers, the general public and communities at risk to disaster in an appropriate format by using, as applicable, geospatial information technology".

== Organization and structure ==
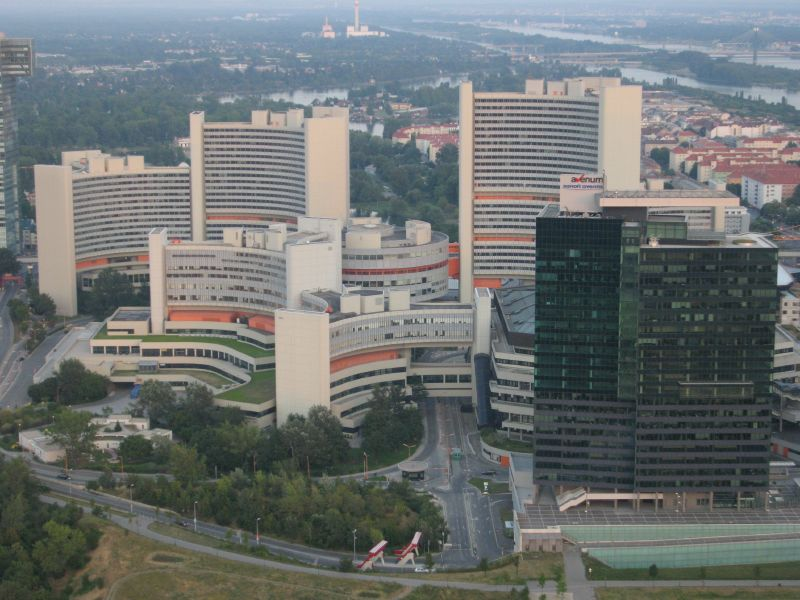
United Nations, Vienna

In its resolution 61/110 of 14 December 2006, the United Nations General Assembly agreed to establish UN-SPIDER as a new United Nations programme, with the following mission statement: "Ensure that all countries and international and regional organizations have access to and develop the capacity to use all types of space-based information to support the full disaster management cycle". In doing so, UN-SPIDER aims at three goals: being a gateway to space information for disaster management support; serving as a bridge to connect the disaster management and space communities; and being a facilitator of capacity-building and institutional strengthening.

UN-SPIDER has three offices in Vienna, Austria, in Bonn, Germany and in Beijing, China.

The UN-SPIDER Vienna office is located at UNOOSA's headquarters in the Vienna International Centre. Its staff members are in charge of general UN-SPIDER coordination, fund-raising, regional support office (RSO) coordination and technical advisory support. The office is supported by the government of Austria.

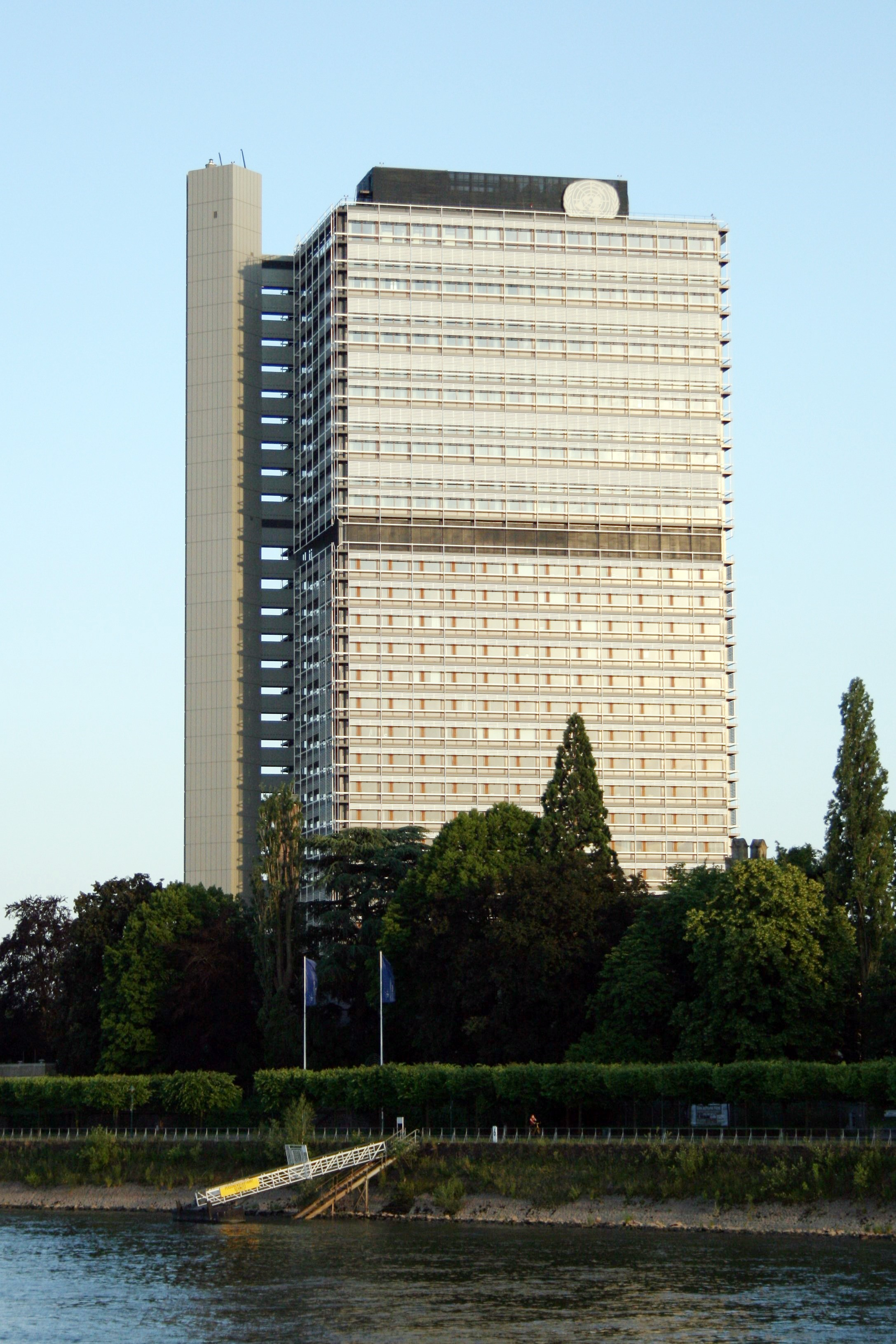
United Nations, Bonn

The UN-SPIDER Bonn office was established in October 2007 with the support of the German Federal Ministry of Economics and Technology (BMWi) and the German Aerospace Center (DLR). The UN-SPIDER Bonn Office is tasked with providing technical advisory support to Member States in Africa and overseeing UN-SPIDER’s knowledge management functions. The goal is to make sure that all relevant information is easily accessible and disseminated to all stakeholders in the areas of disaster management and emergency and humanitarian response. This is done mainly via UN-SPIDER's Knowledge Portal, which is managed by the Bonn Office staff. The Bonn office has also provided technical advisory support in Latin America and the Caribbean.

The Beijing office opened on November 9, 2010, and is supported by the government of the People's Republic of China. The Beijing office is mainly deals with technical advisory support in the Asia and Pacific region and the coordination of UN-SPIDER's network of national focal points.

== UN-SPIDER activities ==
=== Knowledge management ===
The acquisition, processing and transfer of knowledge is the central element of UN-SPIDER's activities. A knowledge base on space-based information and solutions to support risk and disaster management are therefore made available through the UN-SPIDER Knowledge Portal.

The UN-SPIDER Knowledge Portal is central to all knowledge management activities carried out within the framework of UN-SPIDER, as it provides the hosting environment and the dissemination tool for all resulting outputs and products. The Knowledge Portal went online in June 2009 and has continuously been improved and amended ever since. Its main tool is the Space Application Matrix, a sophisticated search engine to make available research papers and case studies on the application of different space-based resources in all phases of the disaster management cycle. The portal also features the latest news from the disaster and risk management and the space communities, information on workshops, training and events as well as profile details on UN-SPIDER's network partners.

UN-SPIDER's knowledge management activities are accompanied by its awareness-raising efforts. Since awareness-raising is a process by which the level of understanding among the persons targeted is raised, fostering change in attitudes and behaviour, is central to the success of promoting the use of space-based information. In the framework of UN-SPIDER, awareness-raising is designed as an ongoing process accompanying, facilitating and preparing activities, as new audiences are addressed, new partnerships are formed and new technological solutions are developed, offering new opportunities for existing and new target groups. UN-SPIDER implements its awareness-raising activities mainly via its publications such as the monthly updates and the biannual newsletter as well as via its Knowledge Portal.

=== Outreach ===
Experience shows that the conduction of activities targeting the full disaster management cycle spans a variety of agencies from the public and the private sector, at different levels, and is best conducted through a coordinated approach. UN-SPIDER's outreach activities contribute to involving practitioners and experts from the disaster management and space communities in UN-SPIDER activities with the end goal of promoting the use of space-based information to support the full disaster management cycle.

UN-SPIDER's outreach activities include the organization of workshops, seminars and expert meetings in all regions as well as the support to similar events organized by its partners. Furthermore, UN-SPIDER staff participates in relevant events all over the world to raise awareness about UN-SPIDER's activities and the opportunities that space-based information offers for disaster and risk management.

=== Technical advisory support ===
Technical advisory support (TAS) is one of the prime activities of the UN-SPIDER programme at the national level. It serves to identify the existing capacity to use space-based information, to analyze the institutional framework to support disaster management through space-based information and to identify the limitations that inhibit the use of such information. TAS attempts to enable member states to overcome these limitations through international cooperation and regional opportunities, networking with regional institutions, and setting up disaster management plans. It covers region-specific aspects such as transboundary issues, emergency response, risk assessment, GIS-based disaster management systems, and disaster risk reduction. TAS efforts range from a simple consultative phone call to the facilitation of technical support, missions, training and workshops. UN-SPIDER's TAS has three pillars: technical advisory missions, capacity building and facilitation of emergency support/technical support.

Technical advisory missions (TAMs) are instruments to identify the needs of member states regarding their capacities to fully take advantage of space-based information. TAMs are officially requested by the respective national government and are conducted by a team of experts. The team meets with key governmental disaster management and development authorities, United Nations organizations, regional and international organizations/initiatives and private entrepreneurs to discuss the topic in depth. TAM results provide recommendations focusing on how to improve the access to and use of space-based information in risk and disaster management. Since 2008 various missions have been carried out to countries in Latin America, the Caribbean, Africa, Asia and the Pacific region.

UN-SPIDER defines its capacity building as the process of facilitating the strengthening of the competency of individuals, teams, and agencies to use space-based information to prevent, mitigate, and respond effectively to the challenges posed by natural hazards and related humanitarian crises. UN-SPIDER capacity-building efforts include four complementary types of activities: Providing policy-relevant advice to institutions and governments regarding the use of space-based (spatial) information to support the full disaster management cycle, facilitating access to space-based data and services, facilitating the training of individuals on access to and use of such data and facilitating access to infrastructure, hardware, and software, and services for space-based applications. Therefore, UN-SPIDER's capacity building simultaneously aims at institutions, individuals and infrastructure.

In the case of emergencies and disasters, UN-SPIDER provides emergency support by taking the role of a bridge linking disaster management agencies in charge of response operations with space agencies, or mechanisms which have been established by the space community such as the International Charter: Space and Major Disasters or EU Copernicus Emergency Management Service. UN-SPIDER provides this support through the activation of its network of regional support offices (RSO) and through links with specific space agencies.

== UN-SPIDER's network ==
UN-SPIDER created a global network in order to foster and strengthen strategic alliances and partnerships on a global and regional scale. There are two types of networks: RSOs and national focal points (NFPs).

=== Regional support offices ===
An RSO is a regional or national center of expertise that is set up within an existing entity by a member state. The establishment of a network of RSOs was agreed upon by the United Nations General Assembly in its Resolution 61/110. UN-SPIDER currently has RSOs in Algeria, Argentina, Japan, Colombia, Germany, Greece, Hungary, Indonesia, Iran, Kenya, Mexico, Nepal, Nigeria, Norway, Pakistan, Panama, Romania, Russia, Sri Lanka, South Africa, Thailand, Ukraine, and the West Indies. Detailed information on all UN-SPIDER RSOs can be found in the Knowledge Portal.

RSOs communicate and coordinate with UN-SPIDER staff on a regular basis, covering the three following realms:

- Outreach and capacity-building activities
- Horizontal cooperation (communities of practice, knowledge management, contributions to the Knowledge Portal)
- Technical advisory support

=== National focal points ===
As defined by the United Nations General Assembly, an NFP is a national institution, nominated by the government of the respective country, representing the disaster management and space applications communities. Among them are for example members of the space - or civil protection agencies. UN-SPIDER networks with all countries through the NFPs.

An NFP works with UN-SPIDER staff to achieve the following goals:

- promoting access to and the use of space-based solutions for disaster management in the respective country
- strengthening national disaster management planning and policies
- implementing specific national activities that incorporate space-based technology solutions in support of disaster management
