= United Nations Office for Outer Space Affairs =

Space agency

- Abbreviation: UNOOSA
- Formation: 13 December 1958; 67 years ago
- Type: Secretariat office
- Legal status: Active
- Headquarters: Vienna, Austria
- Head: Director; Aarti Holla-Maini
- Parent organization: United Nations Secretariat
- Website: www.unoosa.org

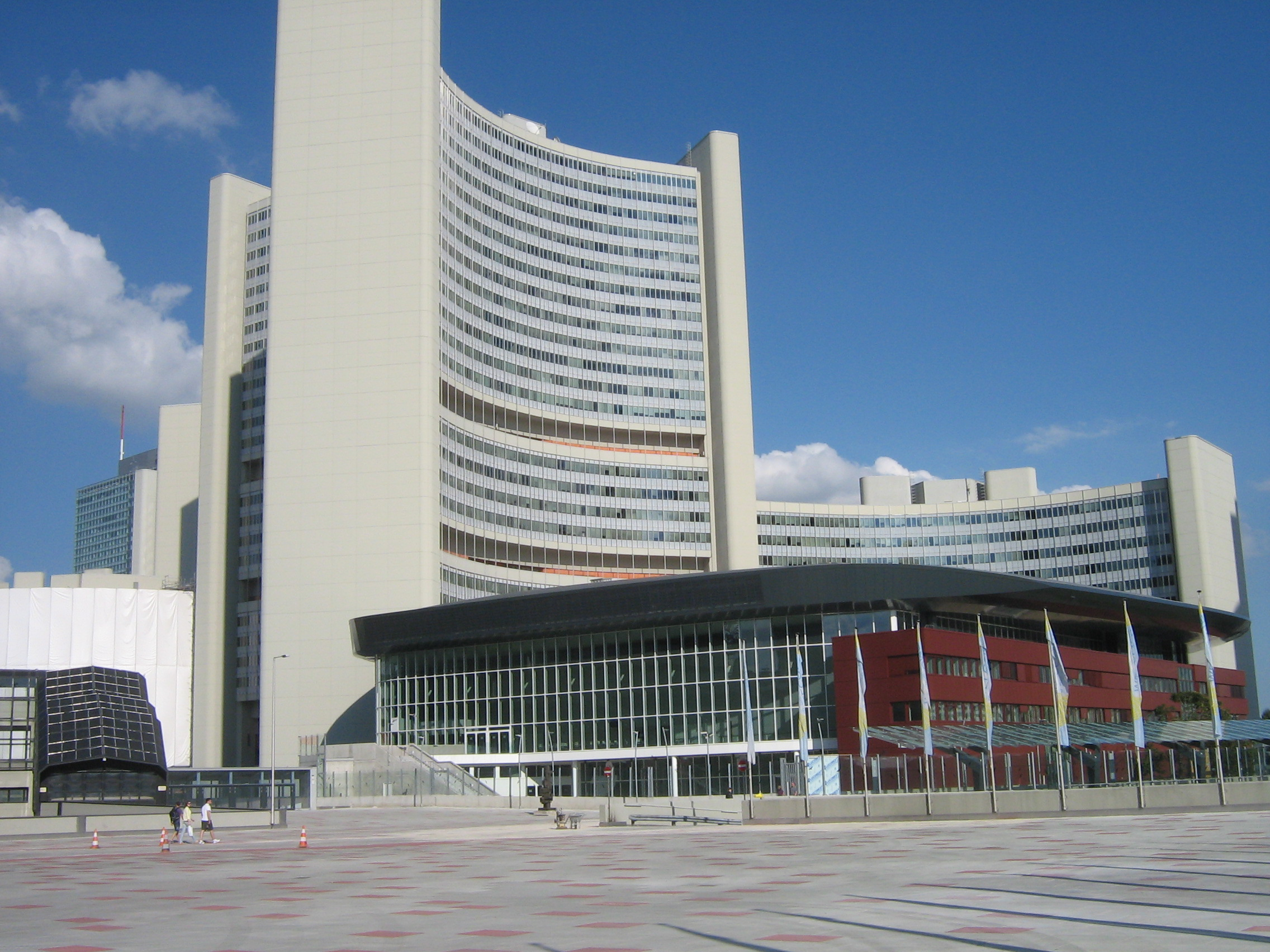
UNOOSA's headquarters are located at the United Nations Office at Vienna

The United Nations Office for Outer Space Affairs (UNOOSA) is an office of the UN Secretariat that promotes and facilitates peaceful international cooperation in outer space. It works to establish or strengthen the legal and regulatory frameworks for space activities, and assists developing countries in using space science and technology for sustainable socioeconomic development.

The Office was established in 1958 to assist and advise the ad hoc Committee on the Peaceful Uses of Outer Space (COPUOS), which was established by the UN General Assembly to discuss the scientific and legal aspects of exploring and using outer space to benefit humankind. The Committee became permanent the following year, with UNOOSA undergoing several structural changes before its relocation in 1993 to the United Nations Office in Vienna, Austria.

As the secretariat of COPUOS, the Office is responsible for helping implement the major international treaties, legal principles, and General Assembly resolutions that together comprise space law. Other duties include advising governments and nongovernmental organizations on space law; maintaining a registry of vessels and objects launched into space; convening forums to discuss various space-related matters; and sponsoring programmes that provide access to space technology.

== History ==
In 1957, the launching of Sputnik 1 prompted a global conversation and debate on the legal, scientific, and political implications of space exploration.

On 13 December 1958, the ad hoc Committee on the Peaceful Uses of Outer Space (COPUOS) was established by the General Assembly in its resolution 1348 (XIII), becoming a permanent body within the General Assembly. They soon met for the first time to discuss a peaceful and legally ordered approach to space exploration. Concurrently, the United Nations Office for Outer Space Affairs (UNOOSA) was created as a small expert unit within the UN Secretariat in New York to assist the Committee in its work.

In 1962, UNOOSA was moved to the Department of Political and Security Council Affairs (DPSCA), where it was transformed into the Outer Space Affairs Division.

In 1967, the Outer Space Treaty, which had been developed by COPUOS, entered into force, creating the first international legal framework governing the conduct of space activities.

In 1992, the Outer Space Affairs Division changed to its current form as the Office for Outer Space Affairs, remaining within Department for Political Affairs and Peacebuilding (which succeeded the DPSCA). The following year, UNOOSA was relocated to its current headquarters at the United Nations Office at Vienna.

At the start of the 21st century, UNOOSA undertook initiatives and programs to fulfill its mandate of promoting widespread and peaceful international involvement in space. In 2005, the International Committee on Global Navigation Satellite Systems (ICG) was established to promote compatibility, interoperability and transparency between all the satellite navigation systems, particularly for developing nations. The following year, the UN-SPIDER programme was created to provide an accessible platform for developing states to use space-based technologies for disaster management and emergency response. Two offices were established (in Bonn, Germany and Beijing, China) to further the programme's work.

In 2009, Japanese astronaut Takao Doi became Chief of Space Applications.

In 2010, the Human Space Initiative was launched to further UNOOSA's mission of providing developing countries with access to the use and exploration of space.

In March 2014, the UN Secretary-General appointed Simonetta Di Pippo of Italy as Director of the Office, who had previously served as Director of Human Spaceflight at the European Space Agency.

In September 2015, pursuant to the Human Space Initiative, UNOOSA partnered with the Japan Aerospace Exploration Agency (JAXA) to launch the "KiboCUBE" programme, which allows developing countries to deploy their own indigenously produced CubeSats from the Japanese Kibo module on the International Space Station. Through the programme, Kenya and Guatemala launched their first satellites in 2018 and 2020, respectively.

On 16 June 2016, UNOOSA announced a partnership with the China Manned Space Agency (CMSA) to give nations the opportunity to fly their experiments and personnel on board the Chinese space station Tiangong.

In September 2016, UNOOSA announced the first United Nations space mission, with an initial target launch date in 2021. The mission will utilize the Dream Chaser spaceplane, designed by the American Sierra Nevada Corporation (SNC), to enable developing nations to send microgravity payloads into low-Earth orbit.

In 2019, the launch date for the proposed Dream Chaser mission, expected to carry up to 35 payloads, was updated to sometime in 2024.

On 26 June 2023, Aarti Holla-Maini, former general secretary of Global Satellite Operators Association, was appointed as the current UNOOSA director.

== Mandate ==
UNOOSA works primarily to implement the decisions of UN General Assembly and of the UN Committee on the Peaceful Uses of Outer Space. The office has the dual objective of supporting the intergovernmental discussions in the Committee and its Scientific and Technical Subcommittee and Legal Subcommittee, and of assisting developing countries in using space technology for development.

The mandate has been adjusted a number of times to allow the Office to undertake, among other tasks, the coordination of the inter-agency cooperation within the United Nations on the use of space technology - UN-Space (resolution 3234 implementing the United Nations Programme on Space Applications (resolution 2601A (XXIV)) and the UN-SPIDER Programme for disaster risk management and emergency response (resolution 61/110).

The Office also coordinates and cooperates with space agencies and intergovernmental and non-governmental organizations involved in space-related activities and, on behalf of the United Nations Secretary-General, the Register of Objects Launched into Outer Space. The office also helps poor nations suffering from climate change related problems by helping them access satellite images for free.

== Structure ==
UNOOSA is headed by a Director appointed by the UN Secretary-General; since 2023, this has been Aarti Holla-Maini of Belgium and the UK. The Director's Office is responsible for public outreach, the Register on Objects in Outer Space, and programmes for youth engagement. It has two sections: the committee, Policy, and Legal Affairs (CPLA), headed by Takemi Chiku from Japan, and the Space Applications Section (SAS), headed by Lorant Czaran from Romania. The CPLA fulfills the Office's secretarial duties to the Committee on the Peaceful Uses of Outer Space, its subcommittees, and its working groups. It also convenes and services the Inter Agency Meeting on Outer Space Activities, known as UN-Space, which is the central inter-agency coordination mechanism in the UN system on overarching space matters. UN-Space meets annually to discuss current and future activities, emergent technologies of interest, and other related matters, particularly regarding the global development agenda. The section is concerned with the establishment of a legal and regulatory framework governing space activities, and actively fosters capacity-building in space law and policy.

The Space Applications Section works on building capacities in the practical application of space technology and space-derived information for development. The Programme concentrates its efforts on ensuring the equal access of all countries to new space-based technologies, especially developing nations. To facilitate the capacity building with focus on developing countries, the office provides three initiatives:

- The Human Space Initiative focuses on the public outreach to promote increased awareness among Member States to the benefits of space technology and its applications.
- The Basic Space Technology Initiative enhances access to space application tools for sustainable development through building capacity in basic space technology.
- The Basic Space Science Initiative supports the growth of small research groups in universities and research institutions in the developing countries in the fields of astronomy and space science.

The Programme also focuses efforts on the potential of space-based information for disaster management and emergency response. The UN-SPIDER programme (established 2006) helps to achieve this objective by being a gateway to space information for disaster management support, serving as a bridge to connect the disaster management and space communities and being a facilitator of capacity-building and institutional strengthening, in particular for developing countries.

The International Committee on Global Navigation Satellite Systems (ICG) promotes voluntary cooperation on matters of mutual interest related to civil satellite-based positioning, navigation, timing, and value-added services. To support the work of ICG, the Office was designated as the Executive Secretariat of ICG. In that capacity, UNOOSA is organizing regional workshops, training courses, and international meetings focusing on capacity-building in the use of GNSS-related technologies in various rapidly growing fields of science and industry.

== Staff ==
Citizens of more than 50 countries have served as staff members, consultants, and interns.

Staff members of the Office have a wide range of educational backgrounds, including space science (including interdisciplinary fields), physics, engineering, computer science, political science, international affairs, and law (including public international law and space law).

At different times, a number of other distinguished people, including Adigun Ade Abiodun, Vladimír Kopal, Mazlan Binti Othman, Luboš Perek, Nandasiri Jasentuliyana, and Takao Doi served at various positions.

== See also ==
- UNOSAT, the United Nations Satellite Centre
- List of government space agencies
- United Nations Committee on the Peaceful Uses of Outer Space
- United Nations Fourth Committee
- United Nations Secretariat
- Space law
- List of space agencies
- Antarctic Treaty Secretariat
- International Seabed Authority

== Bibliography ==
- "Interview with Mazlan Othman, Director of the Office for Outer Space Affairs". News Centre. UN. 4 October 2011.
