= Mazlan Othman =

Malaysian astrophysicist (born 1951)

Yang Berbahagia Professor Emerita Tan Sri Dato' Seri Dr Mazlan Othman PSM SSNS PJN KMN
- مصلان عثمان
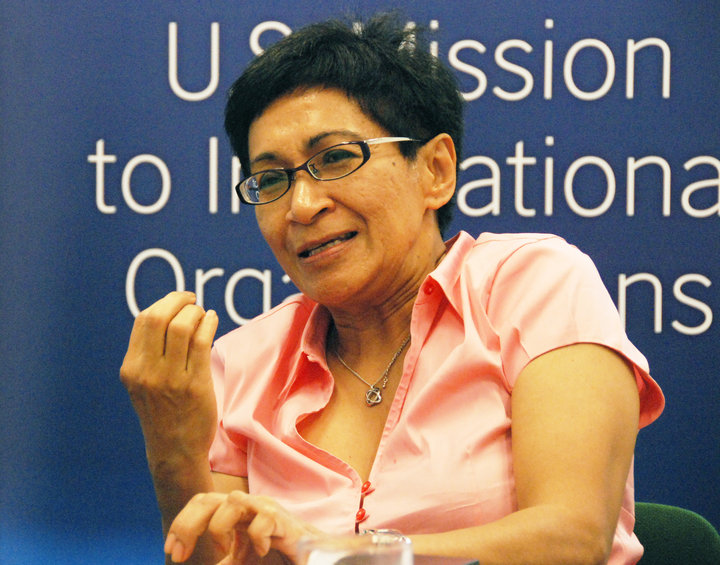
- Mazlan in 2010

Director of the United Nations Office for Outer Space Affairs (UNOOSA)
- In office 2007–2014
- Secretary-General: Ban Ki-moon
- Succeeded by: Simonetta Di Pippo

Personal details
- Born: 11 December 1951 (age 74) Seremban, Negeri Sembilan, Federation of Malaya (now Malaysia)
- Education: University of Otago
- Occupation: Astronomer, Astrophysicist

Mazlan binti Othman (Jawi: مصلان بنت عثمان; born 11 December 1951) is a Malaysian astrophysicist whose work has pioneered Malaysia's participation in space exploration. She was her country's first astrophysicist, and helped to create a curriculum in astrophysics at the national university, as well as to build public awareness and understanding of astronomy and space issues. She was appointed director general of Angkasa, the Malaysian National Space Agency and served as the director of the United Nations Office for Outer Space Affairs in Vienna from 2007 to 2014.

== Early life and education ==
Born in Seremban, Malaysia, Mazlan attended Kolej Tunku Kurshiah, a Malaysian prominent boarding school in Seremban, Negeri Sembilan. Her aptitude for mathematics led to enrolment in a science curriculum. Although her family encouraged her to become a physician MD, she decided to pursue physics instead. She attended the University of Otago in Dunedin, New Zealand, on a Colombo plan scholarship, earning a BSc. (Honours) in 1975. She then joined the National University of Malaysia (UKM) as a tutor, but negotiated an extension to her scholarship and returned to Otago, earning her Ph.D. in physics in 1981 – the first woman to do so since the university was founded in 1869.

== Career ==
Mazlan Othman returned to Malaysia as the country's first astrophysicist, and worked to create a curriculum in astrophysics at the national university, as well as to build public awareness and understanding of astronomy and space issues. She also performed research for a semester at the Kiso Observatory in Japan.

Her interest in public education was rewarded in 1990 when Prime Minister Mahathir Mohamad placed her in charge of the Planetarium Division of the Prime Minister's Department, overseeing development of Planetarium Negara, Malaysia's national planetarium in Kuala Lumpur. After the planetarium opened in 1993, Mazlan was made director general of the government's new Space Science Studies Division, where she launched a microsatellite development program. She received a full professorship the following year.

In November 1999, Kofi Annan, Secretary-General of the United Nations, appointed Mazlan as director of the United Nations Office for Outer Space Affairs (UNOOSA) in Vienna. At the request of Prime Minister Mahathir, she returned to Malaysia in July 2002 to serve for five years as the founding director general of Angkasa, the Malaysian National Space Agency, where her work led to the launch of the first Malaysian astronaut, Sheikh Muszaphar Shukor.

Mazlan was reappointed as UNOOSA director in 2007 by Secretary-General Ban Ki-moon, and left Angkasa to return to the post that December. At UNOOSA she dealt with issues of international co-operation in space, prevention of collisions and space debris, use of space-based remote sensing platforms for sustainable development, co-ordination of space law between countries, and the risks posed by near-earth asteroids, among other topics.

In September 2010, several news sources reported the United Nations would soon appoint Othman to be the ambassador for extraterrestrial contact, apparently basing their claims on remarks she made suggesting that the UN co-ordinate any international response to such contact, and her scheduled appearance on a Royal Society panel that October, "Towards a scientific and societal agenda on extra-terrestrial life." However, a UN spokesperson dismissed the reports as "nonsense", dismissing any plan to expand the mandate of UNOOSA, and in an email to The Guardian, Othman stated, in compliance to the wishes of the United Nations, "It sounds really cool but I have to deny it." She later explained that her talk would illustrate how extraterrestrial affairs could become a topic of discussion at the UN, using as an example the advocacy that led to UN discussion of near-Earth objects and space debris.

After retiring from the United Nations, Othman served on advisory committees and boards involving science and space, taught as a visiting professor, and became a senior fellow of the Academy of Sciences Malaysia. In September 2017, she was named Director of the International Science Council (ISC) Regional Office for Asia and the Pacific.

As of May 2023 she is non-executive member of HKATG, a mostly China-funded satellite program.

== Honours ==
In the 1997 Agong's honours list, Tuanku Ja'afar, the tenth Yang di-Pertuan Agong of Malaysia, conferred the federal decoration and order Panglima Jasa Negara (for meritorious service) on Mazlan, granting her the honorific "Datuk".

Also in 1997, Mazlan's alma mater, the University of Otago, awarded her the degree of Honorary Doctor of Science.

In 2009, for "her work in developing astronomy education in Malaysia and her leading national and international role in space science", the Institute of Physics awarded Mazlan its President's Medal.

In 2013, Mazlan received the "Polarstern-Preis" (Polarstar Award) from the Austrian Space Forum for her engagement to fascinate for space above and beyond duty.

- Malaysia
  - Commander of the Order of Loyalty to the Crown of Malaysia (PSM) – Tan Sri (2021)
  - Commander of the Order of Meritorious Service (PJN) – Datuk (1997)
  - Officer of the Order of the Defender of the Realm (KMN) (1994)
- Negeri Sembilan
  - Knight Grand Companion of the Order of Loyalty to Negeri Sembilan (SSNS) – Dato' Seri (2020)

== Personal life ==
Mazlan Othman has two children, a son who is an aerospace engineer and a daughter born in 1995, and two grandchildren. Retired from the United Nations in 2013, she lives with her daughter (youngest) in Kuala Lumpur, Malaysia.
