= Bernardo Hees =

Brazilian businessman

Bernardo Vieira Hees is a Brazilian businessman. He held the position of chief executive officer (CEO) of The Kraft Heinz Company until stepping down on June 30, 2019. He previously was CEO of The H.J. Heinz Company, Burger King Corporation, and America Latina Logistica, Latin America's largest railroad and logistics company. Hees is also a partner in the global investment firm 3G Capital.

He holds a BA in economics from the Pontifical Catholic University of Rio de Janeiro, where he attended from 1988 to 1992, and in 1997 he took an MBA from Warwick Business School in the United Kingdom. Additionally, he completed the Harvard Business School's Owners/President Management (OPM) program in 2005.

Hees worked at several banks prior to taking his MBA degree and joining America Latina Logistica.

After taking his MBA, Hees began his career at ALL as a logistics analyst in 1998. He would progress from analyst to commercial officer, chief financial officer, and chief operating officer, culminating in his becoming chief executive officer of ALL in January 2005.

After 3G Capital publicized its intended purchase of Burger King in a $3.3 billion leveraged buyout, Hees was announced as the new CEO, replacing John Chidsey. Following this announcement, Hees stepped down as CEO of ALL in September 2010. Hees officially became the CEO of Burger King when the purchase was completed the following month. A major shake-up of Burger King's executive management quickly followed Hees' becoming CEO: no fewer than seven departures of senior and executive vice presidents from the company were announced before October ended.

Hees found himself at the center of a minor but widely reported controversy in March 2011 after a comment to a group of students in Chicago that he had few distractions from his MBA studies at Warwick because "The food is terrible and the women are not very attractive." In his apology Hees stated that his comment was meant to be a humorous anecdote.
