= Nandasiri Jasentuliyana =

Sri Lankan lawyer

Nandasiri Jasentuliyana is a Sri Lankan lawyer. He was the Director of the United Nations Office for Outer Space Affairs and the Deputy Director-General, United Nations Office at Vienna. He was also the President of International Institute of Space Law; Executive Secretary of the UN Conference on Nuclear Energy and UN Conference on the Peaceful Uses of Outer Space.

Jasentuliyana had served as a Political Affairs Officer at Department of Political and Security Council Affairs, United Nations; Member Board of Trustees of the International Space University (ISU); Member Board of Trustees at International Academy of Astronautics (IAA); Member Bureau, International Astronautical Federation (IAF); Member Editorial Board of Journal of Space Policy, UK; Member Editorial Board, Journal of Space Law USA; Member, Board of Directors of the International Institute of Air and Space Law, Faculty of Law, University of Leiden and Programme Officer, Asia Foundation.

Educated at Richmond College, Galle, he holds advanced degrees in Law and International Relations from the Universities of Ceylon, London and McGill, and is an Attorney-at-Law. He holds a Masters in Air and Space Law (1965) from McGill University and a diploma from the Academy of International and Comparative Law.

== See also ==
- Sarasa News Broadcast
- http://njasentuliyana.tripod.com/
- Same Sky Different Nights Launch in Los Angeles
- http://thuppahi.wordpress.com
- Nandasiri Jasentuliyana Keynote Lecture On Space Law
- United Nations Office for Outer Space Affairs
- International Institute of Law: Biography
- International Institute of Law
- Sri Lanka Foundation Lifetime Achievement Award

== Publications And Reviews ==
- Amazon.com: Books By Dr. Nandasiri Jasentuliyana
- http://www.barnesandnoble.com: Books By Dr. Nandasiri Jasentuliyana
- http://www.alibris.com/Books By Dr. Nandasiri Jasentuliyana
- http://www.goodreads.com: Books By Dr. Nandasiri Jasentuliyana
- http://www.dailymirror.lk/opinion/172-opinion/30698-same-sky-different-nights.html
- http://www.thesundayleader.lk/2013/06/02/same-sky-different-nights/
- https://web.archive.org/web/20141217223646/http://www.sundayobserver.lk/2007/10/21/spe01.asp

== Photos ==
- Same Sky Different Nights: Sri Lanka Launch
- Same Sky Different Nights: Los Angeles Launch
- Chandramohan Felicitation
- http://srilankafoundation.org: Gallery

== Other Links ==
- International Space University, Board of Advisors
- http://www.mcgill.ca/iasl/
- European Center for Space Law
- http://www.cocosl.com/
- http://www.dailynews: true-genius-and-exceptional-human-being
- http://richmondcollege.org/literary_works.html
- http://richmondcollege.org/famous_alumni.html
