= Viktor Klimenko =

Viktor Klimenko is the name of:

- Viktor Klimenko (singer) (born 1942), singer who made himself known as the "Singing Cossack"
- Viktor Klimenko (gymnast) (born 1949), former Soviet gymnast and Olympic champion
