= Linda Jackson (businesswoman) =

British businesswoman and business executive

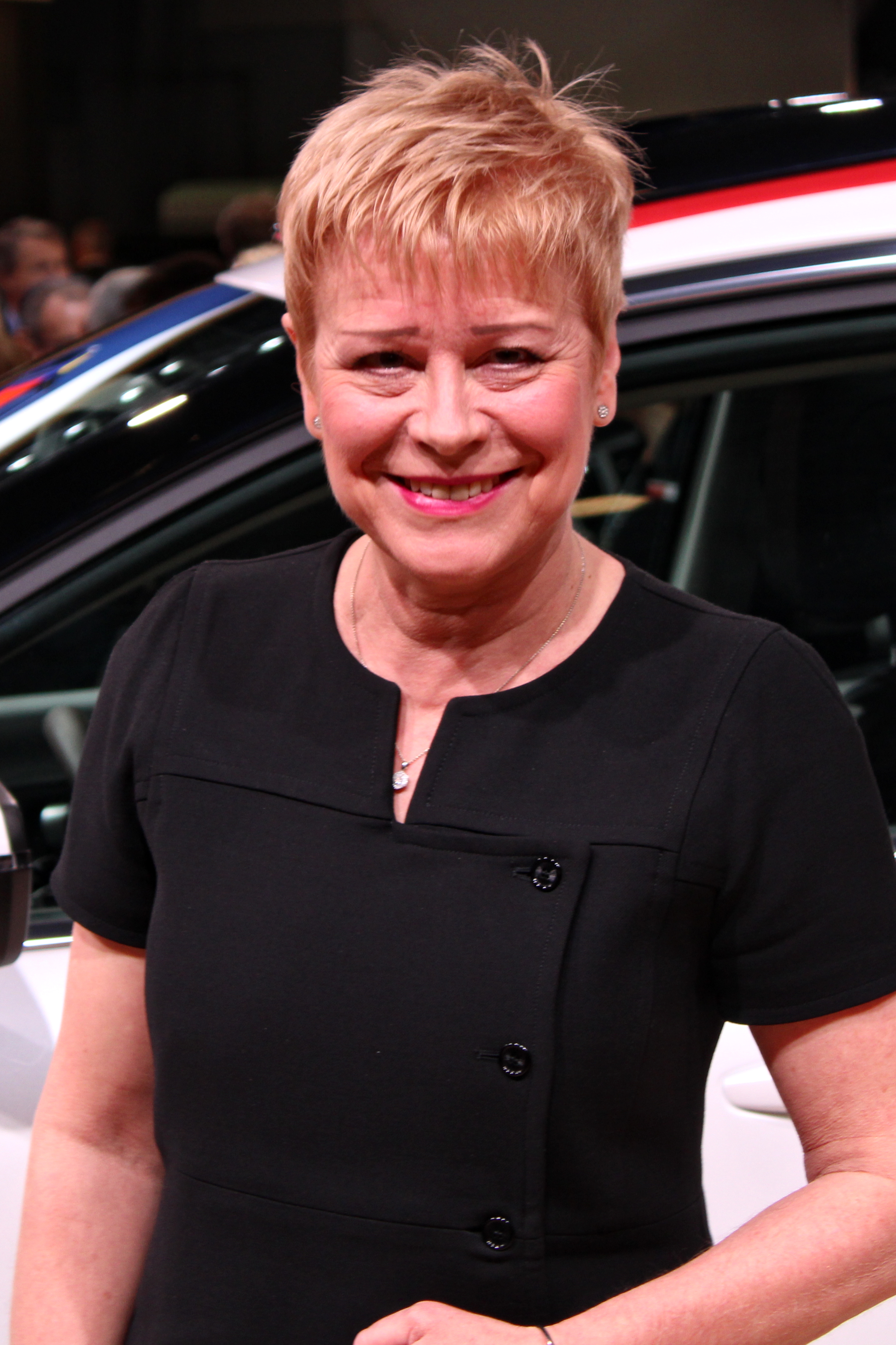
- Jackson at 2018 Paris Motor Show
- Born: 1959 (age 65–66); Coventry, West Midlands, England
- Education: University of Warwick
- Occupation: Businesswoman
- Title: CEO, Peugeot

Linda Jackson (born 1959) is a retired British businesswoman, formerly the chief executive officer (CEO) of Peugeot from 2021 to 2025, and of Citroën from 2014 to 2020.

== Career ==
Linda Jackson grew up in Coventry. In 1977, she began working her first job in the auto industry in a temporary position as an accounting clerk at Jaguar. Later that year, she began working in a clerical position at British Leyland, later Austin Rover, and subsequently Rover Group. During her time at the company, Rover sponsored her through an executive MBA (EMBA) program at Warwick Business School at the University of Warwick. She attended evening classes while working and completed the program between 1988 and 1992.

Jackson held multiple positions in finance and sales at Rover before being named finance director of Rover France in 1998. She was promoted to managing director in 2000, and European finance director in 2004.

In 2005, Jackson joined Citroën as finance director. In 2009, she became finance director of Citroën France before serving as the managing director for Citroën UK and Ireland from 2010 to 2014. Her main goal during this tenure was to boost brand recognition of Citroën in the UK, a market where Citroën remained a small player on a declining slope, and focused on the dealership distribution network.

In 2014, Jackson became the CEO of Citroën. She is the first English woman, and third woman overall, to run a major car company. During her time as CEO, Jackson began overseeing a plan to stabilize and secure profitability of the company.

In January 2020, she was succeeded as CEO of Citroën by deputy CEO Vincent Cobée, and she would instead "lead a study to clarify and support brand differentiation within a brand portfolio".

In January 2021, she was appointed as CEO of Peugeot following the formation of Stellantis, the company created by the merger of the PSA Group and Fiat Chrysler Automobiles (FCA). She took over the position while her predecessor, Jean-Philippe Imparato had transferred to Alfa Romeo.

In February 2025, Jackson announced her retirement; Peugeot then appointed Alain Favey as her successor as CEO.

== Personal life ==
Jackson met her late husband, David, at Jaguar while completing her EMBA. He died of cancer in the summer of 2014.

== Prizes ==
In 2018, Linda Jackson was named the "Most influential woman" in the motor industry by Autocar. The same year, Jackson won the Sue Brownson Award for 'Outstanding Leadership in Automotive'.
