= Vincent Cobée =

French businessman (born 1968/69)

- Born: 1968 or 1969 (age 57–58)
- Education: École Polytechnique; Ecole Nationale des Ponts et Chaussées; Harvard Business School
- Occupation: Businessman
- Title: CEO, Citroën
- Term: January 2020-
- Predecessor: Linda Jackson

Vincent Cobée (born 1968/1969) is a French businessman, and the chief executive officer (CEO) of French carmaker Citroën since January 2020.

Cobée earned degrees from the École Polytechnique, Ecole Nationale des Ponts et Chaussées and Harvard Business School.

In January 2020, Cobée who had formerly worked for Nissan and Mitsubishi and was deputy CEO Citroën, succeeded Linda Jackson as CEO.
