= Flexibility (engineering) =

Ability of a system to adapt to external changes

Flexibility is used as an attribute of various types of systems. In the field of engineering systems design, it refers to designs that can adapt when external changes occur. Flexibility has been defined differently in many fields of engineering, architecture, biology, economics, etc. In the context of engineering design one can define flexibility as the ability of a system to respond to potential internal or external changes affecting its value delivery, in a timely and cost-effective manner. Thus, flexibility for an engineering system is the ease with which the system can respond to uncertainty in a manner to sustain or increase its value delivery. Uncertainty is a key element in the definition of flexibility. Uncertainty can create both risks and opportunities in a system, and it is with the existence of uncertainty that flexibility becomes valuable.

== Flexible Manufacturing System ==
Flexibility has been especially thoroughly studied for manufacturing systems. For manufacturing science eleven different classes of flexibility have been identified [Browne, 1984], [Sethi and Sethi, 1990]:

- Machine flexibility - The different operation types that a machine can perform.
- Material handling flexibility - The ability to move the products within a manufacturing facility.
- Operation flexibility - The ability to produce a product in different ways.
- Process flexibility - The set of products that the system can produce.
- Product flexibility - The ability to add new products in the system.
- Routing flexibility - The different routes (through machines and workshops) that can be used to produce a product in the system.
- Volume flexibility - The ease to profitably increase or decrease the output of an existing system. At firm level, it is the ability of a firm to operate profitably at different output levels. Firms often use volume flexibility as a benchmark to assess their performance vis-à-vis their competitors.
- Expansion flexibility - The ability to build out the capacity of a system.
- Program flexibility - The ability to run a system automatically.
- Production flexibility - The number of products a system currently can produce.
- Market flexibility - The ability of the system to adapt to market demands.

These definitions yield under current conditions of the system and that no major setups are conducted or investments are made (except expansion flexibility). Many of the flexibility types are linked to each other; increasing one flexibility type also increases another. But in some cases tradeoffs between two flexibility types are needed.

== Bibliography ==
- Browne, J. et al. "Classification of flexible manufacturing systems", The FMS Magazine 1984 April, 114–117.
- Sethi, A.K. and Sethi, S.P. "Flexibility in Manufacturing: A survey", The International Journal of Flexible Manufacturing Systems 1990 2, 289–328.
