= Max Klymenko =

Ukrainian internet personality

- Макс Клименко
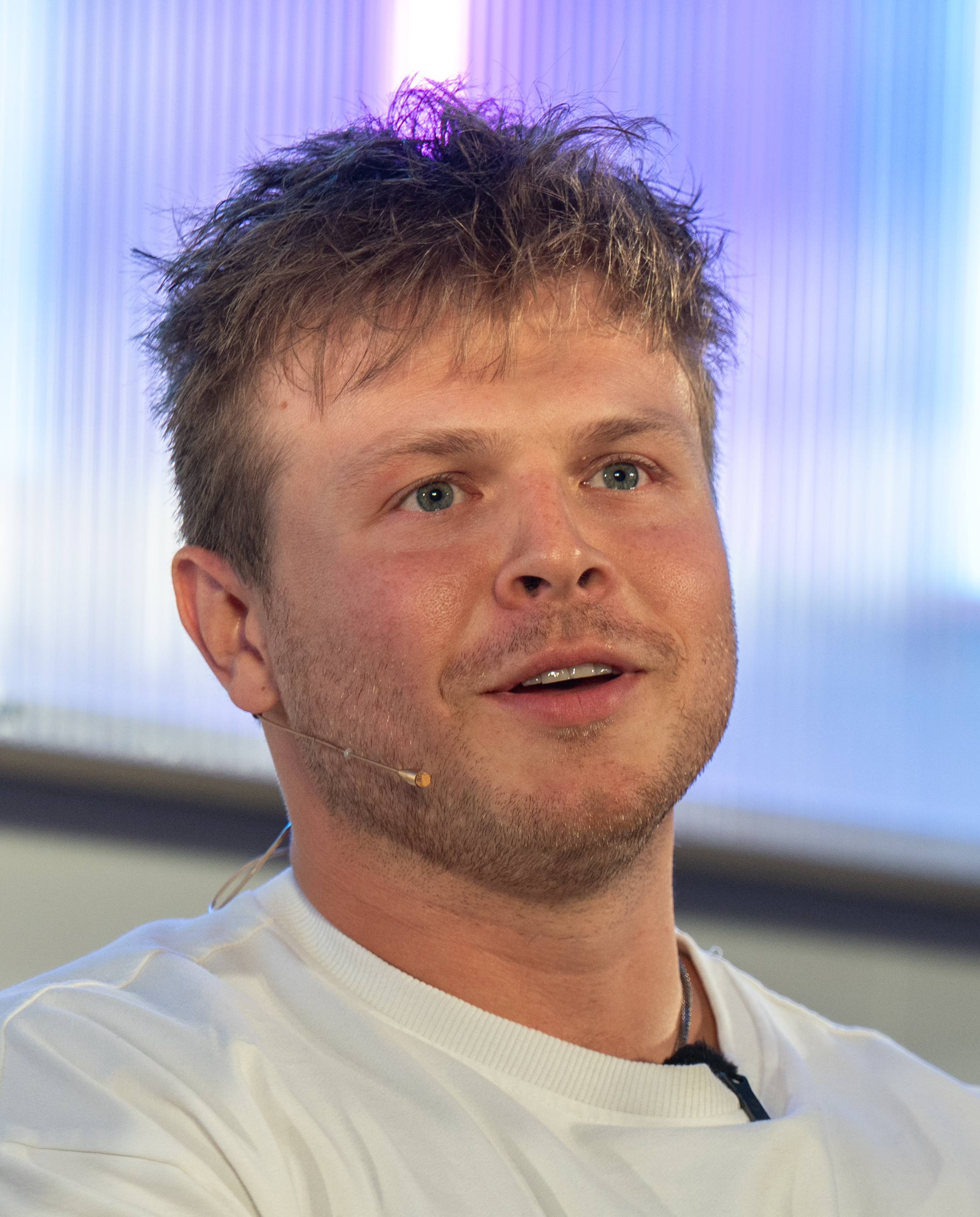
- Klymenko in 2026
- Born: Maksym Oleksiyovich Klymenko; 27 July 1995 (age 31); Mykolaiv, Mykolaiv Oblast, Ukraine
- Education: Odesa National Economics University; University of Southampton; University of Warwick; London School of Economics
- Occupation: Entertainer
- Years active: 2018–present
- Known for: Career Ladder

TikTok information
- Page: Max Klymenko
- Followers: 9.7 million

YouTube information
- Channel: Max Klymenko
- Subscribers: 4.62 million
- Views: 5.5 billion views
- Last updated: 29 July 2026
- Website: www.klymand.co

Maksym "Max" Oleksiyovych Klymenko (English: /klɪˈmɛn.koʊ/; Ukrainian: Максим «Макс» Олексійович Клименко [ˈmaksim oˈɫɛksʲijovɪt͡ʃ kɫeˈmɛnkɔ]; born 27 July 1995) is a Ukrainian internet personality and educator, recording short videos for TikTok and YouTube, regarding career, business, brands and public issues. His most popular series, titled Career Ladder, focuses on him attempting to guess careers of people met on a street in under two minutes, while standing with them on a ladder. As of October 2026, Klymenko has 9.9 million followers on TikTok, and about 4.59 million subscribers on YouTube. He is based in London, England.

== Early life and education ==
Maksym "Max" Klymenko was born on 27 July 1995, in Mykolaiv, Ukraine. He graduated from the Odesa National Economics University in economics, from the Warwick Business School in business, from the London School of Economics in sociology, and from the University of Southampton in jurisprudence. He formerly worked as a lawyer and a consultant.

== Career ==
Max Klymenko began his social media creative career by writing a blog about artificial intelligence, later also starting a podcast. In 2018, he started a YouTube channel, where he originally published videos about books and AI. He also founded an educational channel on TikTok. Klymenko has created videos about careers, business, brands and public issues, garnering over 7.7 million followers on TikTok, and 3.4 million subscribers on YouTube, as of September 2025. In 2024, he began creating a series of short vertical videos, titled Career Ladder, in which he stands on the back rungs of a ladder, inviting one guest at a time to stand on the front side, attempting to guess their career through a series of questions in under two minutes. Klymenko stated the format was created to discuss careers without the biases which accompany such conversations, including someone's appearance, income, status, and location. The format was subsequently copied by numerous creators, becoming one of the most popular on TikTok. Among people who participated in the Career Ladder were Keir Starmer and Andy Burnham, the subsequent prime ministers of the United Kingdom, Alexander Stubb, the president of Finland, and Mark Rutte, the secretary general of NATO. In 2025, he won the TikTok Award in the Creator of the Year category. The same year, he was also nominated for the bCreator Award, the largest digital content creators' awards in the United Kingdom, in the Creator Marketing Campaign of the Year category.

In 2021, he also recorded a speech for TED Talk regarding social media.

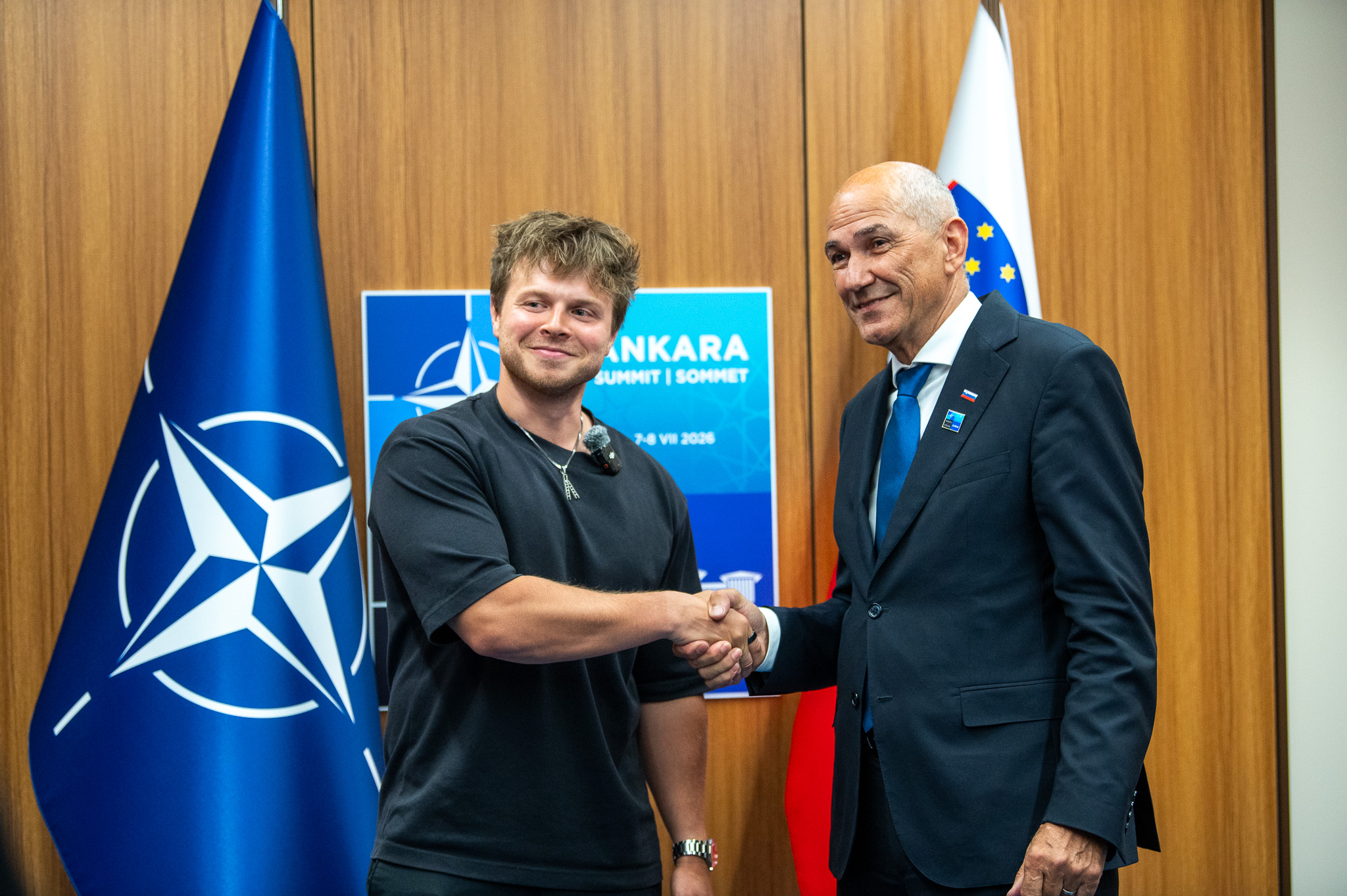
Klymenko (left) meeting with Slovenian Prime Minister Janez Janša at the 2026 Ankara NATO summit

Klymenko participated in aid campaigns for the Ukrainian refugees affected by the 2022 Russian invasion of Ukraine. He also funded 100 abortions for Ukrainian women in Poland, who were victims of rape by Russian soldiers, citing and criticising laws which make it difficult for them to get treatment. In March 2026, Klymenko held a short interview with Volodymyr Zelenskyy, the president of Ukraine, during his visit to the United Kingdom.

In 2024, Klymenko was listed on the Forbes 30 Under 30 list, in the Media and Marketing category. In 2025, he became a member of the NATO Youth Advisory Board.

He is also the founder of KLYM&CO, a communications agency that provides consulting, strategy and production services to clients in 25 countries, which includes the United Nations, World Wide Fund for Nature, NATO, Google, and Microsoft, among others.

== Personal life ==
Klymenko resides in London, England.

== Awards and nominations ==
Ceremony	Year	Category	Nominated work	Result	Ref.
bCreator Awards	2025	Creator Marketing Campaign of the Year	Career Ladder	Nominated	
TikTok Awards	2025	Creator of the Year	Career Ladder	Won	
