= Aleksandr Klimenko =

Aleksandr Klimenko may refer to:

- Alyaksandr Klimenka (born 1983), Belarusian international footballer
- Aleksandr Klimenko (shot putter) (1970–2000), Ukrainian shot putter
- Aleksandr Klimenko (footballer), Turkmen footballer and coach
