= Warwick Business School =

Academic department of the Faculty of Social Sciences of Warwick University, England

- Type: Public business school
- Established: 1967
- Parent institution: University of Warwick
- Accreditation: AACSB, AMBA, EQUIS
- Dean: Andy Lockett
- Location: Coventry and London, England, United Kingdom; 52.3821°N 1.5655°W
- Campus: Semi-rural (Coventry); urban (London)
- Website: www.wbs.ac.uk

Warwick Business School (WBS) is the business school of the University of Warwick and an academic department within the Faculty of Social Sciences. It was established in 1967 as the School of Industrial and Business Studies. The school offers undergraduate and postgraduate degree programs, and non-degree executive education.

The main WBS campus is located at the University of Warwick in Coventry, with a secondary site in The Shard in Southwark that concentrates on executive education.

WBS alumni include Linda Jackson, CEO of Peugeot and former CEO of Citroën, and Bernardo Hees, former CEO of Kraft Heinz and Burger King.

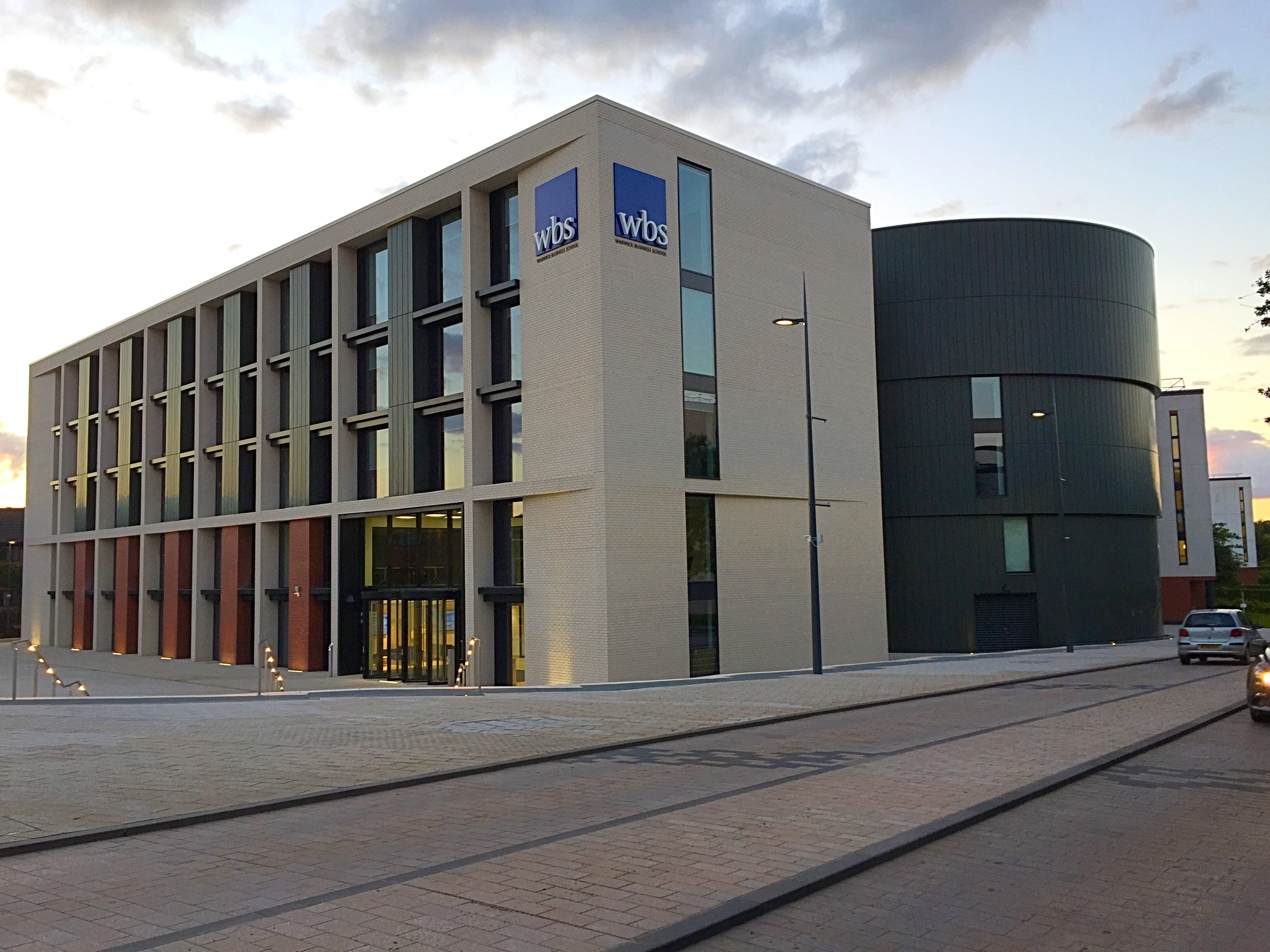
WBS extension building

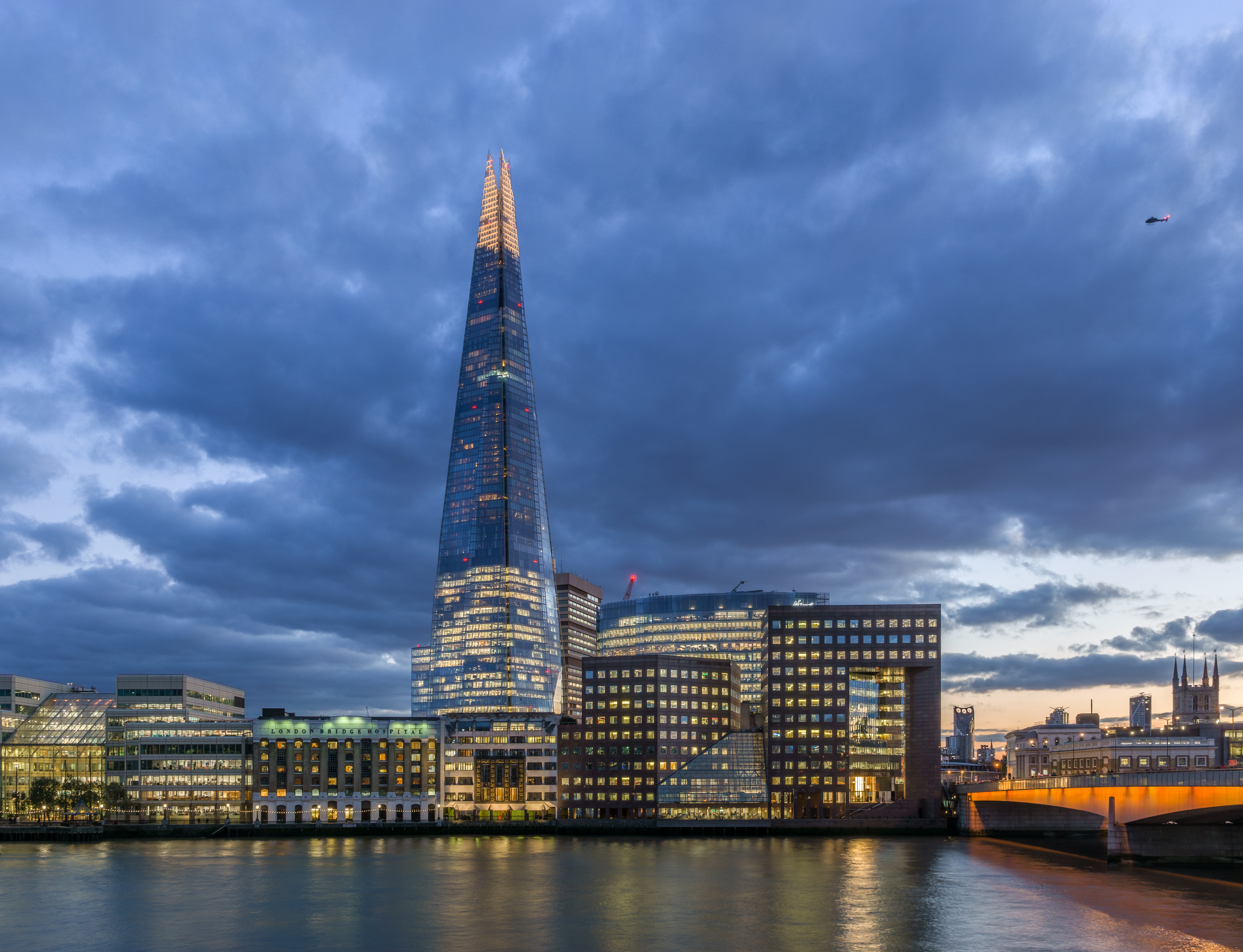
The Shard, site of WBS's London campus

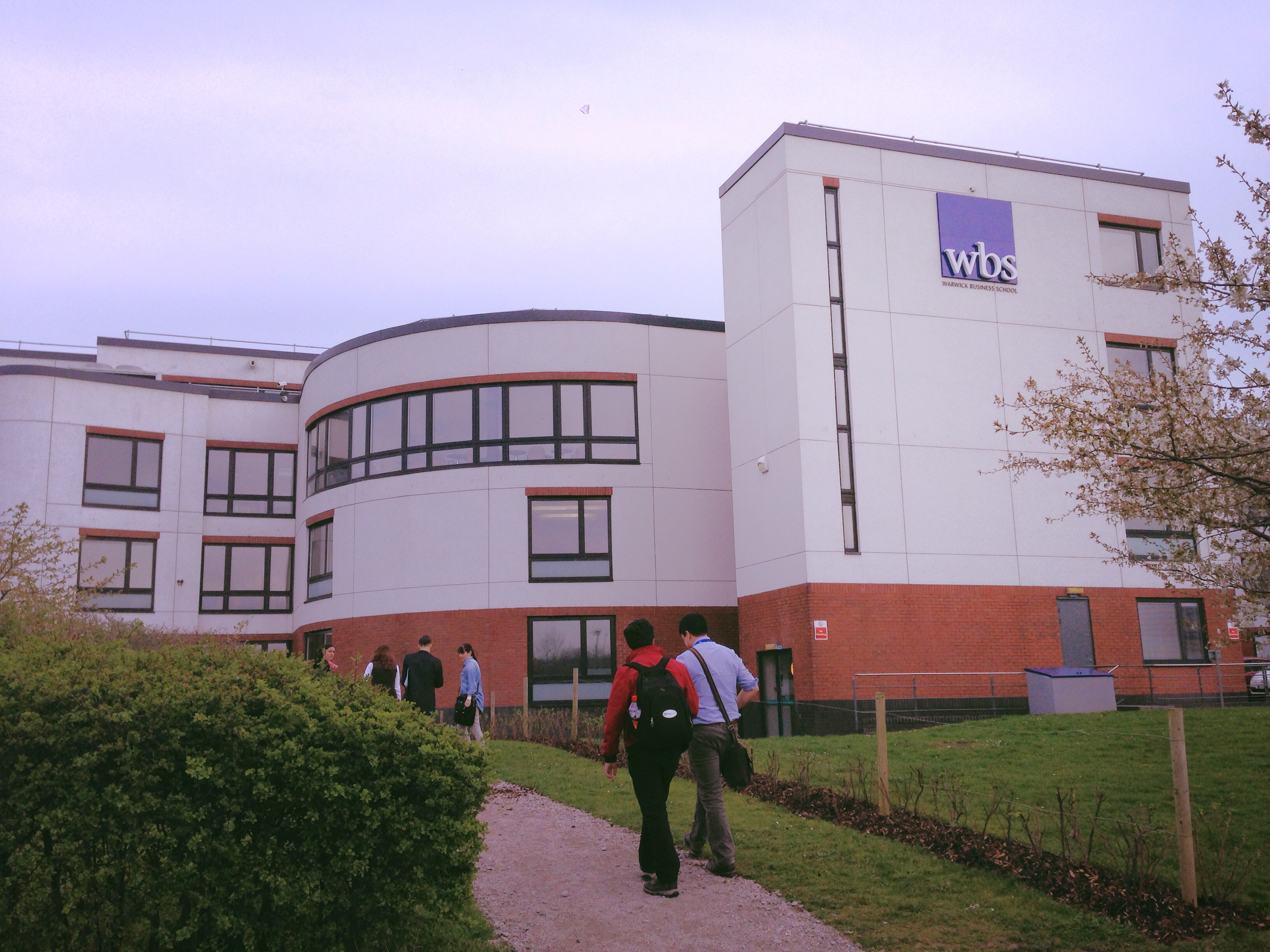
WBS view from Scarman road

== History ==
Warwick's School of Industrial and Business Studies (SIBS) was founded in 1967, with five academic staff including Hugh Clegg as the first Professor of Industrial Relations, and 24 postgraduate students on three courses. The first master's courses were launched in 1968, and undergraduate courses started in 1969. In 1973, WBS joined the Conference of University Management Schools (now the Chartered Association of Business Schools), which had been established in 1971.

In 1981, the MSc in Management was renamed the MBA. In 1985 WBS launched an evening MBA and this was followed in 1986 by an MBA by distance learning. By 1987, the department had grown to over 100 staff, 815 students and 11 programs. In 1988, SIBS was renamed Warwick Business School. In 1997, the staff tally was over 260, with 3,160 students across 17 programs. In 2007, there were a total of 304 staff and over 7,500 students on 26 courses.

In 2000, WBS became the first UK business school to hold triple accreditation from the Association of MBAs (AMBA; from 1970 according to WBS although, according to AMBA, the accreditation service was not launched until 1983), the EFMD Quality Improvement System (EQUIS; from 1999) and from the Association to Advance Collegiate Schools of Business (AACSB; from 2000).

In September 2014, WBS opened a second site on the 17th floor of the Shard in Southwark, London, to teach part-time MSc Finance, MSc Human Resource Management and Executive MBA courses.

== Academic profile ==
=== Research ===
In the 2021 Research Excellence Framework, Warwick was ranked joint fifth out of 108 institutions on grade point average (GPA) for business and management studies, with a GPA of 3.51. It was ranked fourth for research power and third for market share. It was fifth in terms of full time equivalent staff entered, with 158 research-active academics.

=== Accreditation ===
As of 2025, WBS holds triple accreditation from the Association to Advance Collegiate Schools of Business (AACSB), the Association of MBAs (AMBA) and the EFMD Quality Improvement System (EQUIS), and also holds an Athena SWAN Gold award.

=== Admission ===
The school's selection criteria for the full-time MBA encompass candidates' academic achievements, professional experience and test scores, with essay questions being used to assess whether candidates demonstrate critical thinking skills and strategic knowledge. As of 2019, WBS had a median GMAT score of 660 and an average admission rate of 33%. A typical demographic ratio on the distance-learning MBA in 2015 was: 36% British, 14% EU and 50% non-EU.

=== Partnerships ===
Warwick Business School is a member of the Partnership in International Management network.

== Notable people ==
=== Academic staff ===
As of 2023:

- Steve Alpern: Professor of Operational Research
- Söhnke M. Bartram: Professor of Finance
- Graham Loomes: Professor of Economics and Behavioural Science
- Tobias Preis: Professor of Behavioral Science and Finance
- Andrew Sentance: Professor of Practice; former Senior Economic Advisor at PwC, former Monetary Policy Committee member of The Bank of England

=== Alumni ===
- Aung Tun Thet, Myanmar economist and management consultant
- Bernardo Hees, former CEO of Heinz and of Burger King
- Linda Jackson, former CEO of Citroën
- Idris Jala, former Government of Malaysia minister and former CEO of Malaysia Airlines
- Max McKeown, author, consultant and researcher specializing in innovation strategy, leadership and culture
- Sean Clarke, former CEO of Asda supermarket
- Lord Paddick, former Commissioner, Metropolitan Police, and London Mayoral candidate for the Liberal Democrats in 2008 and 2012

=== Deans ===
Until 1998, the school was led by a chair elected by the academics. Since then, it has been led by an appointed dean.

- Brian Houlden (1967–1973)
- Roger Fawthrop (1973–1976)
- Derek Waterworth (1976–1978)
- Robert Dyson (1978–1981)
- Thom Watson (1981–1983)
- Sir George Bain (1983–1989)
- Robin Wensley (1989–1994)
- Bob Galliers (1994–1998)
- Robert Dyson (1998–2000)
- Howard Thomas (2000–2010)
- Mark P. Taylor (2010–2016)
- Andy Lockett (2016–present)

== See also ==
- List of business schools in Europe
