= Max McKeown =

British writer

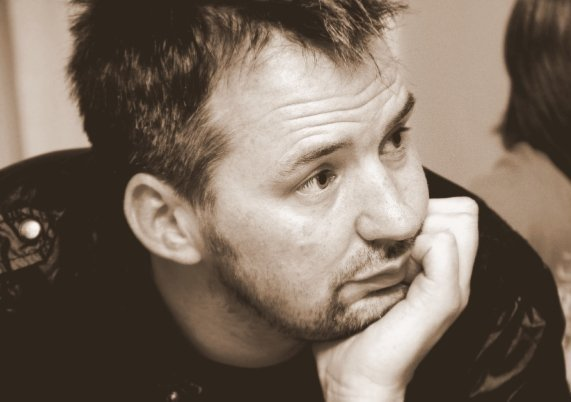
- Born: London, England, United Kingdom
- Occupation(s): Management consultant and writer
- Children: 4
- Relatives: Greg McKeown (Author)

Max McKeown (born in London) is an English writer, consultant, and researcher specialising in innovation strategy, leadership and culture. He has written six influential books and conducts research with Warwick Business School (Young, 2008). He is a fellow of the RSA. He served on the advisory board for the Rollins Center for eBusiness. He earned his master's degree in Business Administration and PhD from the Warwick Business School under the supervision of Professor David Wilson and Professor Sotirios Paroutis, who was in turn supervised by Andrew Pettigrew.

McKeown is an advocate of innovation culture. He also argues that failure can be positive for progress if it is viewed as part of learning (Chynoweth, 2010). He makes a distinction between change and progress, "change is inevitable but progress is not" (McKeown, 2008). His work described how 'creativity doesn't come from hiring the right people, but from creating the right conditions' (Buchanan & Huczynski, 2013, McKeown, 2008). He also argues that "reacting matters as much as planning" and that strategy is effective only when it shapes events in the real world (McKeown, 2011).

In Adaptability, he made a contribution to innovation literature by setting out four levels of adaptation that social groups can achieve. Collapsing is the end of the social group. Coping is survival 'without prosperity, pride or joy'. Thriving provides benefits that are worthwhile and desirable. The final level, Transcending overcomes the limits of the old system, allowing more for everyone. The three step model of Adaptability (RUN) involves (1) Recognition of required adaptation (2) Understanding of adaptation required (3) Necessary adaptation. He describes High Adaptability (Killer) Cultures – or HACKs – as supportive of self-renewal that nurture and develop the talent of what he refers to as High Adaptability, High Achievement individuals – or HAHAs – who learn to become stronger when faced with adversity as compared to Low Adaptability, Low Achievement individuals – or LALAs – who become increasingly inflexible when put under pressure (McKeown, 2013).

Social groups, and individuals, attempt adaptation following three steps: First, recognition of the need to adapt. Second, understanding of the necessary adaptation. And third, adapting as necessary. In most societies there is a mix of different systems at different levels of adaptation fit. Many efforts to reach higher levels of adaptation fail because one or more of the steps is not completely successfully. People may fail to understand change is necessary, or not understand what kind of change is necessary, or simply avoid making those changes.

In The Strategy Book, one of the winners at the Chartered Institute of Management's Book of the Year Awards 2013 (Atherton, 2013), argues that "strategy is about shaping the future" (McKeown, 2011) and approaches strategy as something that people do, both as style of thinking and the combination of actions taken along with their consequences. He describes how individuals, and groups, can increase their ability to think and act strategically, by finding the best route to desirable ends with available means. He wrote the book to help real people use strategy partly in response to a call to action from Richard Whittington, writing about school of strategic management research known as Strategy-In-Practice (Whittington, 2002). In 2014, Japanese, Swedish and Portuguese translations will be published.

== Citations ==
- Moore, S. (2000), What Makes McKeown Click? Business Post, 16 October 2001
- Whiteley, P. (2001), Just Trying to Keep the Customer Satisfied, The Times, 25 January 2001
- Crainer, S. (2001), Flavour of the Month, BA Inflight Magazine, February 2001
- White, M. (2001), Couch Commerce, Finance on Windows, pp48–55
- Fielding, R. (2001), Remote Working Held Back, Computing, pp41
- Bailey, V. (2001), Data Goldmine, The Customer Report, pp01–02
- Boucher, P, Lewis, J, and Weekes, S. (2001), 21 To Watch, Personnel Today, 13 March 2001 pp21–25
- Nicolle, L, (2001). Hard Times, Computer Weekly, 5 April 2001
- Whittington, R. (2002). Practice Perspectives on Strategy: Unifying and Developing a Field.
- McKeown, M. (2008). Max Headroom, People Management, 2008, 14(4), pp. 28–32.
- Young, R, (2008). Interview with Max McKeown, Strategic Direction, 2008 Volume: 24, Issue: 9 Page: 28-30
- Snowball, C, (2008). Three of a Kind: What's New In The Innovation Game?, Management Today, November 2008
- Chynoweth, C, (2010). The Positive Side of Failure, The Sunday Times, 20 June 2010
- McKeown, M, (2008). Max Headroom, People Management 21 Feb vol 14 no 4 2008 pp28–32
- McKeown, M, (2012). Why Plan B Matters Most, 30 March 2012, Management Today
- Rigby, R, (2012). The Careerist: Strategic Thinking, Financial Times, 20 May 2013
- Atherton, J, (2013). Perky: It's Been Judged The Literary Equivalent of Coffee, Metro Newspaper, 30 January 2013
- Buchanan, D, & Huczynski, A, (2013) Organizational Behaviour, 8th Edition, Chapter 15 pp 54–5
- McKeown, M. (2013). HACK is the Killer App for Risk Managers. Strategic Risk Magazine. April 2013.

== Books ==
- The Strategy Book (3rd Edition), Financial Times / Prentice Hall, 2019.
- The Innovator’s Book, LID Press, 2019.
- #NOW: The Life Changing Psychology of Always Moving Forward, Aurum Press, 2016. 5 audio CDs
- The Innovation Book, Financial Times / Prentice Hall, 2014.
- Adaptability: The Art of Winning, Kogan Page, 2012.
- The Strategy Book
- The Truth About Innovation, Prentice Hall, 2008.
- Unshrink: Yourself – People – Business – the World, Financial Times/ Prentice Hall, 2002.
- Why They Don't Buy, Financial Times/ Prentice Hall, 2001.
- E-Customer, FT.com, 2001.

== See also ==
- Erich Lindemann
- Kubler-Ross
- Theresa Rando
- John Bowlby
